= Iggwilv =

Fictional wizard in Dungeons & Dragons

- World of Greyhawk character
- Iggwilv on the cover of Dungeon #149. Art by James Ryman.

In-universe information
- Aliases: Tasha of the Company of Seven; Author of the Demonomicon; Witch Queen of Perrenland; Mother of Demigod Iuz
- Race: Human
- Gender: Female
- Class: Wizard/Archmage
- Alignment: Chaotic evil (3.5 edition); True neutral (5th edition)
- Home: Gray Waste of Hades; formerly Ket and Perrenland

Iggwilv is a fictional wizard from Greyhawk, a campaign setting for the Dungeons & Dragons roleplaying game, who has also gone by the name Tasha. She was created by Gary Gygax and debuted in the adventure The Lost Caverns of Tsojcanth (1982). She has subsequently appeared in additional adventure modules and sourcebooks over the various Dungeons & Dragons editions. The 5th Edition sourcebook Tasha's Cauldron of Everything (2020) features marginalia by the titular Tasha. She is also associated with various in-game magic items and spells.

Iggwilv was originally characterized as a selfish, evil-aligned magic user with much power and a penchant for sexual manipulation. Later portrayals depicted the character as having a more neutral alignment and a greater focus on knowledge and discovery. She is the creator of the fictional demonomicons, which later served as inspiration for a real life sourcebook of the same name. As with many Greyhawk characters, sources often contradict on exact details regarding Iggwilv.

In 2027, Iggwilv and her vampire daughter, Drelnza, will appear in the upcoming adventure Greyhawk: Crown of the Witch Queen. As Tasha, the character will also appear in the upcoming ongoing comic series Dungeons & Dragons (November 2026) and in the upcoming action-adventure video game Warlock, voiced by Maggie Robertson.

== Publication history ==
=== Creation and conception ===
Gygax has cited the Finnish epic Kalevala as inspiration for Iggwilv. The name of Louhi, a character in the Kalevala, is given by Gary Gygax as an alias of Iggwilv. Iggwilv debuted in Gygax's The Lost Caverns of Tsojcanth (1982), "an adventure where players explored caverns once occupied by the powerful arch-mage". This adventure also introduced the Demonomicon of Iggwilv which was described as "a treatise on the powerful evil creatures of the lower planes".

The name "Tasha" and the association with laughter were created when a young girl sent Gary Gygax a letter (in crayon) asking him to create a spell involving laughter.

=== 1st and 2nd edition ===
The spell, Tasha's Uncontrollable Hideous Laughter, was then included in a list of magic-user spells in Dragon #67. In 1984, Dragon #82's article on magical research added the spell book "Lore of Subtle Communication by Tasha" which had the possibility of containing a clue to one of the following spells: ventriloquism, message, comprehend languages, legend lore, and Tasha's uncontrollable hideous laughter. "Gygax provided no further context for who Tasha was, but an adventure published in Dragon #83 (about two years after Tasha's Hideous Laughter first appeared in the pages of that magazine) mentioned a 'Natasha the Dark' in an adventure exploring Baba Yaga's hut".

Tasha's uncontrollable hideous laughter was then included as one of the spells featured in the 2nd Edition AD&D Player's Handbook (1989).

Shannon Appelcline, author of Designers & Dragons, highlighted that "in Dragon #225 (January 1996), Robert S. Mullin talked about Iggwilv's other book, the Nethertome, and laughably changed the name of her magnum opus to The Fiendomicon of Iggwilv … because that's what TSR did in the AD&D 2e era (1989-1997)".

=== 3rd and 3.5 edition ===
In Dragon #336 (October 2005), the Demonomicon of Iggwilv returned to its original name. Between 2005 and 2015, a column series titled the Demonomicon of Iggwilv was published across Dragon, Dungeon, and Dragon+ where the material was supposedly taken from the artifact it was named after.

Expedition to the Ruins of Greyhawk (2007) "revealed that Iggwilv once joined the Company of Seven, a group of famous adventurers, under the guise of Tasha. Tasha's true motivations were unclear, but the adventure spells out the connection between the two characters". Dragon #359 (September 2007), the final print issue, highlighted that "Tasha and Iggwilv were one and the same, and were also related to Baba Yaga's adopted daughter Natasha".

=== 4th edition ===
Iggwilv's presence in the new "points of light" default setting was confirmed in 4th edition's Manual of the Planes (2008). Iggwilv is briefly described as Graz'zt's sometimes ally and former lover. The Demonomicon (2010) is based on Iggwilv's fictional work and presents excerpts from the text. Iggwilv's character history in 4th edition is similar to that in the World of Greyhawk. She is presented as an extremely powerful manipulator of Abyssal politics.

Dungeon #196, in a 2011 remake of the Dancing Hut adventure, "further established that Natasha the Dark would eventually become Iggwilv". Dragon #414, in a 2012 article on the history of the "Iggwilv-Graz'zt Affair", stated "she has been known by many names over the years: Natasha, Hura, then Tasha, and finally Iggwilv".

=== 5th edition ===
In the Forgotten Realms adventure Waterdeep: Dragon Heist, it is noted that Tasha's hideous laughter is commonly used throughout Waterdeep as a security measure against burglars, usually coupled with a glyph of warding cast on rooftops.

Iggwilv is the narrator of the supplemental sourcebook Tasha's Cauldron of Everything (2020), however, the book "focuses on the wizard before her Iggwilv transformation, with some input from her time as the Witch Queen". "In a call with media [...], lead rules designer Jeremy Crawford pushed back on the idea that Tasha could be described by a single type of alignment, stating that her alignment was whatever suited her current plans best. That's a definite change from her previous depiction as a 'chaotic evil' sort of character, and reflects a further development of her character beyond that of the oftentimes stereotypical scheming seductress that Iggwilv was portrayed as in past adventures". In another interview, Crawford said that "Tasha is a person who is unfazed by beings of many sorts—in addition to having consorted with darker beings, she also has consorted with, you know, beings of the upper planes. Basically, Tasha, in her brilliant curiosity, is untroubled by the various moral variations in the planes of existence. If there is knowledge to be learned and to [sic] power to possibly be gained, Tasha is unafraid to face it. [...] Tasha is whatever alignment suits her for the day, so I guess in that sense she is true neutral".

This book also added three new spells to the game that are attributed to Tasha: Tasha's Caustic Brew, Tasha's Mind Whip and Tasha's Otherworldly Guise.

In The Wild Beyond the Witchlight, Iggwilv's history is presented with her being the adopted daughter of Baba Yaga, becoming Tasha the Wizard, rising to be demon-consorting Iggwilv the Witch Queen, before finally taking on the persona of Zybilna, an archfey ruling over the fey realm of Prismeer. As Zybilna, Iggwilv is a much more benevolent ruler who resides with the Palace of Heart's Desire, her darkest emotions magically removed. A glimpse of Iggwilv's future shows her evolving into a white-haired hag.

At San Diego Comic-Con 2026, Dark Horse Comics announced a new ongoing series, titled Dungeons & Dragons, scheduled to debut in November 2026. Set in the Forgotten Realms, the series will feature a depowered Mordenkainen attempting to stop a draconic apocalypse while teaming up with other characters, such as Volo and Tasha. It will be written by Jackson Lanzing and Collin Kelly with pencils by Ibraim Roberson, ink by Arabson Oliveira, and colors by Dan Brown. At Gen Con 2026, Wizards of the Coast announced that Iggwilv's vampire daughter Drelnza will be the central focus of the upcoming adventure module Greyhawk: Crown of the Witch Queen (2027). They also announced that the character, as Tasha, will be the warlock patron in the upcoming action-adventure video game Warlock; she will be voiced by Maggie Robertson.

=== Publication ===
Iggwilv has been mentioned in a variety of sourcebook and articles for the Dungeons & Dragons game. Some of her more significant appearances include:

- The module Castle Greyhawk (TSR, 1988)
- The module Iuz the Evil (TSR, 1993)
- Living Greyhawk Gazetteer (Wizards, 2000)
- A series entitled "The Demonomicon of Iggwilv" from Dragon (2005–2007)
- Fiendish Codex I: Hordes of the Abyss (Wizards, 2006)
- "Enemies of my Enemy." Dungeon #149 (Paizo, 2007)
- Expedition to the Ruins of Greyhawk. (Wizards, 2007)
- "Unsolved Mysteries of D&D." from Dragon #359 (Paizo, 2007)
- "Iggwilv's Legacy: The Lost Caverns of Tsojcanth" from Dungeon #151. (Wizards, 2007)
- "Treasures of Greyhawk: Magic of the Company of Seven." from Dragon #359. (Paizo, 2007)
- Demonomicon (Wizards, 2010)
- "History Check: The Iggwilv-Graz'zt Affair" from Dragon #414. (Wizards, 2012)
- Tasha's Cauldron of Everything (Wizards, 2020)
- The Wild Beyond the Witchlight (Wizards, 2021)

== In-universe character biography ==
=== Description ===
Iggwilv is said to have two forms, one of which is that of an old crone (said to be her true form), and the other, a human female of dark beauty. In the latter form, Iggwilv has long black hair and pale skin. It is said none who have seen her in her true form still live.

She has many alternate names. On Oerth she has been called the Witch Queen of Perrenland and the Mother of Witches. She is known as Louhi on one alternate Prime Material Plane world, and as Ychbilch on another. Those close to her sometimes address her as Wilva.

In the adventure Lost Caverns Of Tsojcanth, it was said that the long-dead archmage Iggwilv left her heavily guarded treasures in the caverns.

=== Related characters ===
A number of relationships exist between Iggwilv and the major characters of Greyhawk:

- Iggwilv is the adopted daughter of Baba Yaga.
- She imprisoned and seduced the demon lord Graz'zt, who sired her a son, Iuz.
- She is also the mother of the destroyed vampiress Drelnza.
- She is notorious for dealing with demons from the Abyss.
- She was at one time the apprentice of Zagig Yragerne, and a member of the Company of Seven (as Tasha).
- Iggwilv is a fierce enemy of the Circle of Eight.

=== History ===
According to published background, Iggwilv is said to have once been named Natasha, and it is under this name that she was "adopted" as a child by the witch Baba Yaga. Under Baba Yaga's tutelage, Natasha grew into a talented spellcaster, and soon became known as "Natasha the Dark," perhaps in contrast to another adopted daughter of Baba Yaga, Iggwilv's "sister," Elena the Fair.

Iggwilv next appeared in Ket some 300 years ago, in the 3rd century CY, where she was known as Hura. After being driven from Lopolla for plundering the Vault of Daoud (where it is assumed she acquired Daoud's Wondrous Lanthorn), Hura made her way to the Free City of Greyhawk. Now using the name Tasha, Iggwilv encountered the wizard Zagig Yragerne, who quickly (and scandalously) took her on as an apprentice. Sometime during this period (early 4th century CY), Tasha also served as a member of the Company of Seven, Zagig's adventuring band, and developed the spell Tasha's Uncontrollable Hideous Laughter. Zagig and Tasha's relationship culminated in the imprisonment the demon lord Fraz-Urb'luu. When Zagig was unaware, Tasha spoke to the imprisoned demon lord, and learned many secrets. Shortly thereafter, Iggwilv absconded with many of Zagig's magical tomes, including the Tome of Zyx, which she would later make additions to and rename The Demonomicon. As such, she is credited as the author of "The Demonomicon of Iggwilv". The "Demonomicon" includes other spells she invented such as "Dolor", "Ensnarement", "Exaction", "Imbrue", "Implore", "Minimus containment", and "Torment".

Iggwilv traveled to the Yatil Mountains, in the unclaimed wilderness near the Velverdyva River, to a twisted mountain now called Iggwilv's Horn, said to be the last resting place of the ancient mage Tsojcanth. There, using the lore and power she had stolen from Fraz-Urb'luu and Zagig, she bound Tsojcanth to her service, using him as her slave for generations.

Iggwilv next appears in the historical records of Perrenland in 460 CY. Using what she had learned (and stolen) from Zagig, Iggwilv summoned and imprisoned the demon lord Graz'zt. She managed to seduce the demon lord into helping her with her plans of conquest and went on to bear him a son, Iuz. In 480 CY, she assembled an army and attacked Perrenland from her base in the Yatils known as the Lost Caverns. It is thought that at some point during or prior to this period of conquest, Graz'zt gifted Iggwilv with a magical cloak of pit fiend hide known as Fiend's Embrace. Iggwilv's conquest of Perrenland was complete by 481 CY, and she held a firm grip on that nation until 491 CY, when Graz'zt escaped her control. Graz'zt had suggested, maliciously, that Iggwilv bind Tsojcanth to use as a living seal against the alarmingly spreading rift to the Abyss beneath Iggwilv's Horn. Iggwilv was caught off guard when Tsojcanth fought back for the first time in years. Weakened by the battle, she was doubly unable to resist Graz'zt's subsequent attack of his own. Iggwilv herself was forced to battle Graz'zt, just barely managing to slay his earthly form, banishing him to the Abyss. As a consequence of this battle, Iggwilv's beautiful form was wracked by magic and split into two hideous manifestations. Iggwilv was left shattered and powerless, enabling the native Perrenlanders to defeat her forces and regain their nation. After the loss of Perrenland, little was heard from Iggwilv for decades, and for a short while, she was presumed dead.

In the 570's, Iggwilv had two prominent clashes with the Circle of Eight, who had sent adventurers to thwart her plans. The first took place in the fabled Lost Caverns of Tsojcanth and ended with the destruction of her daughter, the vampiress Drelzna. The second regarded her plans to bring a large number of fiends to Oerth, which was thwarted by a band of adventurers (Warnes Starcoat, Agath of Thrunch, Franz Torkeep, Rowena of the Silverbrow, Reynard Yargrove, and Rakehell Chert) who recovered the Crook of Rao from a magical demiplane known as the Isle of the Ape.

She last clashed with agents of the Circle of Eight in 585 CY when Warnes Starcoat employed a band of adventurers to recover Tenser's clone from Luna. Iggwilv currently resides in a manor in the Gray Waste of Hades. Her current plans, if any, are unknown.

== Reception ==
Iggwilv was named one of the greatest villains in D&D history in the final issue of Dragon. Iggwilv was #7 on Game Rant's "10 Must-Have NPCs In Dungeons & Dragons Lore To Make Your Campaigns Awesome" list, in which the article states that Iggwilv "becomes the person to call for anyone with the slightest interest in demonology. Her Demonomicon of Iggwilv (also a column in the Dragon magazine) highlighted her research into the many demons and terrifying magic that can be tapped from the Nine Hells. Iggwilv stands alongside Mordenkainen as one of the most powerful spellcasters not just in Forgotten Realms but the entire multiverse".

Corey Plante, for Inverse, highlighted that the Greyhawk character "is a mage who was raised by Baba Yaga, a chaotic and frightening witch with sentient teeth. A long-time frenemy of fellow wizard Mordenkainen, Tasha grew up into a powerful archmage who ruled an entire nation as its Witch Queen before transforming herself into a demi-god called Iggwilv. [...] Different aspects of her personal history have been featured in past iterations with the occasional contradiction, [...]. Tasha, a chaotic evil character who is one of the most powerful archmages in the multiverse, is the source of many legends and tall tales".

James Grebey, for SyFy Wire, highlighted that "Tasha is one of the most famous characters to come out of the game's iconic Greyhawk campaign setting" and that the character goes from "a powerful witch raised by the arch-hag Babba Yagga" to becoming "a demi-god" that "exists as both a hero and villain to would-be D&D players".

On the narration of Tasha's Cauldron of Everything (2020), Charlie Hall, for Polygon, wrote, "the voice of Tasha feels a bit out of place, as though a time traveler has returned to the Forgotten Realms with some spicy tweets to share. Ultimately, the marginalia didn't detract from the other good bits inside".

== In other sources ==
"The Revenge of Ghorkai," a d20 adventure by Gary Gygax in The Slayer's Guide to Dragons (Mongoose Publishing, 2002), mentions a demigoddess called "The Mother of Witches." Given that Gygax created Iggwilv, and the adventure map strongly resembles the Yatil Mountains, many assume that this demigoddess is meant to be Iggwilv.

== See also ==
- World of Greyhawk
- List of Greyhawk characters
- Gary Gygax
- Wizard (Dungeons & Dragons)
- Company of Seven
