= Maure Castle =

Fictional location for fantasy games

Maure Castle is a fictional location in the World of Greyhawk setting for the Dungeons & Dragons fantasy role-playing game. Maure Castle is a massive castle and dungeon complex located in the Duchy of Urnst.

== Publication history ==
Maure Castle was a location used in a campaign that Robert J. Kuntz ran for Gary Gygax, and they later both worked on. This campaign, in its pre-commercial form in 1972–1973, was the seed from which much of the World of Greyhawk campaign setting and the Dungeons & Dragons game itself originated. Gygax wrote about his experiences in this game in what would later be called "one of the foundations of our favorite hobby," by Dungeon magazine editor-in-chief, Erik Mona. Gygax's article was written for the May issue of Wargamer's Digest, and was later reprinted in the Dungeon issue which acted as sequel and rules update to the original module in July 2004.

Maure Castle was featured as the setting for the first published form of the adventure, WG5 Mordenkainen's Fantastic Adventure. In 2004 the adventure was updated to the 3.5 edition rules by Kuntz, Mona and James Jacobs (with some advisory material provided by Gygax), and re-titled "Maure Castle." While Dungeon magazine typically contains three adventures and a number of columns, issue #112 was dominated by the updated adventure, and contained no other adventures. The adventure itself was preceded by a reprint of the 1974 article/short story "Swords and Sorcery - In Wargaming" by Gygax, which introduced Dungeons & Dragons. Kuntz followed this adventure up with "Chambers of Antiquities" in Dungeon #124, and "The Greater Halls" in Dungeon #139. The new version of Maure Castle that Kuntz created for these magazines was created as a substitute for his Castle El Raja Key, the biggest dungeon setting in his campaign world of Kalibruhn, to allow Kuntz to retain his intellectual property over El Raja Key.

== Description ==
=== Original three levels ===
Maure Castle is divided into physical "levels". The first level features a pair of impassable doors under the abandoned Maure Castle that prevent access to castle itself. Beyond the doors is a fairly open dungeon with several rooms placed throughout. Each area includes its own challenge, ranging from images that come to life and attack to pools of dangerous fish to a climactic encounter with an iron golem.

On the second level is the first modern occupant, Hubehn and his guards, and eventually his master, Eli Tomorast. Eli is an insane mage, bent on the collection of arcane knowledge at all costs. He is in these dungeons to study them and the treasures which they contain.

The final level is populated by worshipers of a demon named Kerzit, which Tomorast had set up as a false god. These worshipers include a band of gnolls, a group of mages (one of whom is surprisingly trigger-happy) and a pair of torturers.

The first three levels of the updated adventure "Maure Castle" in Dungeon #112 roughly map to the original three levels in the first module, ultimately encountering the demon Kerzit. However, these were substantially expanded, and the events of the updated dungeon include the ramifications of the first module's invasion by Mordenkainen and his band. In fact, the resurrected Eli Tomorast has been plotting his revenge on the mage for several months, though he is in The Statuary (see below) at this time.

==== The Statuary ====
The Statuary is a new level of Castle Maure included in Dungeon #112. This dungeon is actually part of the castle itself, where the previous levels were outlying complexes. The ancient magics of the Maure "family" are at play in this dungeon, involving a lich, a reconstructed member of the family and an evil psychic entity known as the Id Core which fuels an endless war between the other two. This is also the new location of Eli Tomorast, who seeks to eliminate the warring forces and gain access to the secrets of Maure Castle.

==== Chambers of Antiquities ====
The fifth level of the dungeon was published as a stand-alone module in Dungeon #124 in 2005. The module involves a storehouse of magical traps, artifacts and other devices gathered by the architect of Maure Castle, known only as "Uncle".

==== The Greater Halls ====
The sixth dungeon is titled, Maure Castle: The Greater Halls, and was published in 2006 in Dungeon #139. The Greater Halls is a tour of the Maures' dark connections to the Abyss. This adventure pits the players against the devices of the Maures and the machinations of the Demon Queen of Succubi, Malcanthet.

==== Warlock's Walk ====
First mentioned in the listing of additional dungeon levels below Maure Castle in Dungeon #112 (see below), Warlock's Walk is a level designed by Uncle as a magical gauntlet and proving ground for the Maure family members. Rob Kuntz ran this level twice at GenCon 2007 (in Indianapolis), and it was also run at GenCon UK in 2007. Kuntz released Warlock's Walk for free on the Pied Piper Publishing web site. The exact relationship and placement of Warlock's Walk relative to the other published levels of Maure Castle remains unknown.

The Warlock's Walk was also published in the fanzine The Oerth Journal, issue 23.

==== Additional Levels ====
As detailed in fragments Afelbain's Diary (in Dungeon #112, pages 88–89), the following additional levels exist below Maure Castle: 2nd The Retreat, 3rd Old Laboratories and Testing Chambers, 4th Dark Tunnels, 5th Old Dungeon, 6th Chambers of Antiquities, 7th The Statuary, 8th The Greater Halls, 9th The Family Crypts, 10th The Reliquary, 11th The Outer Sanctum, 12th The Treasury, 13th The Old Caves, 14th Elluvia's Pit, 15th Warlock's Walk, 16th The Cells, 17th The Furnaces, 18th Our Master's Level.

Additional information about the Maure Castle dungeon levels is also revealed in James Jacobs' "Demonomicon of Iggwilv" article on Malcanthet in Dragon #353 (Elluvia's Pit is specifically mentioned).

==== Portals ====
There are at least 8 portals to other planes as Expedition To The Ruins of Greyhawk states that the apprentices of the last Suel mage of power, Slerotin, left Oerth at Maure castle, each to their own personal demiplane. The key to access one world is a magical device called an Octych. Only one Octych has been discovered (in the ruins of Castle Greyhawk), and another lies in Dragotha's treasure hoard in Paizo's "Age of Worms" adventure "Into the Wormcrawl Fissure" (in Dungeon Magazine 134 [May 2006]), while the others remain lost. One other is located in the Living Greyhawk adventure CORS3-03 Return to the Ghost Tower of Inverness by Erik Mona and Creighton Broadhurst.

== Reception ==
Chris Hunter for Imagine magazine called its description in Mordenkainen's Fantastic Adventure a "dungeon in the traditional sense", but criticized "the feel of an early generation dungeon, having traps with no real explanation; instant kill encounters" and logical errors such as allowing the dungeon's denizens no exit past the unopenable doors that seal it. Lawrence Schick, in his 1991 book Heroic Worlds, called the castle "A three-level dungeon in the classic mode."

Dungeon Magazine #112 won the 2005 Gold ENnie for Best Adventure, and was one of the first "modern" issues of Dungeon to sell out, even with a much larger print-run than usual (per Erik Mona, editor and publisher).

Dungeon Master For Dummies lists the "Maure Castle" adventure from Dungeon #112 as one of the Ten Best Dungeon Magazine Adventures.

In a review of the Maure Castle adventures from Dungeon in Black Gate, Jeffrey Talanian said "While I haven't conducted a textual analysis to compare the original AD&D version with this update, from what I have read I do believe the spirit of the original was retained and that the expansions don't disgrace it" and concluded that "This probably stems from Mona's love for Greyhawk — and his appreciation for its originators and the lore they created."
