= Mordenkainen's Fantastic Adventure =

Dungeons & Dragons adventure module

- The cover of the module, with art by Clyde Caldwell, showing Mordenkainen the Mage.
- Code: WG5
- TSR product code: 9112
- Rules required: 1st Ed AD&D
- Character levels: 9 - 12
- Campaign setting: Greyhawk
- Authors: Robert J. Kuntz and Gary Gygax
- First published: 1984
- ISBN: 088038168X

Mordenkainen's Fantastic Adventure by Robert J. Kuntz and Gary Gygax is an adventure module for the Dungeons & Dragons role-playing game, published by TSR, Inc. in 1984. It originally bore the code "WG5" and was intended for use with the Advanced Dungeons & Dragons first edition rules. Because it is one of the WG modules, it is a module intended for the World of Greyhawk campaign setting. It was later updated in 2004 to the Third Edition Revised rules in Dungeon magazine, issue #112, as Maure Castle. There were subsequently two additional installments in issues #124 and #139.

== Plot summary ==
Mordenkainen's Fantastic Adventure is a three-level dungeon adventure scenario intended for use with high-level player characters, and features the appearances of characters from Rob Kuntz and Gary Gygax's original Greyhawk campaign.

The module begins when the players are informed that a pair of impassable doors has been discovered under the abandoned Maure Castle. Suspecting that these iron doors lead to fantastic treasures, many have tried to gain access, and all have failed.

The adventure is broken up into physical "levels", the first is entered through the doors. Once the players find a means of bypassing the doors, they are presented with a fairly open dungeon with several rooms placed throughout. Each area includes its own challenge, ranging from images that come to life and attack to pools of dangerous fish to a climactic encounter with an iron golem.

On the second level, the party encounters the first modern occupant, Hubehn and his guards, and eventually his master, Eli Tomorast. Eli is an insane mage, bent on the collection of arcane knowledge at all costs. He is in these dungeons to study them and the treasures which they contain.

The final level is populated by worshipers of a demon named Kerzit, which Tomorast had set up as a false god. These worshipers include a band of gnolls, a group of mages (one of whom is surprisingly trigger-happy) and a pair of torturers.

The climax of the module is an encounter with the demon Kerzit himself.

== Publication history ==
WG5 Mordenkainen's Fantastic Adventure was written by Robert J. Kuntz and Gary Gygax, with a cover by Clyde Caldwell and interior art by Jeff Easley, and was published by TSR in 1984 as a 32-page booklet with an outer folder.

This module, according to the Introduction, was based on the campaign that Robert J. Kuntz ran for Gary Gygax, and they later both worked on. The original version was written in 1972-1973. Mordenkainen's Fantastic Adventure, however, was the first published form of the adventure. This campaign, in its pre-commercial form, was the seed from which much of the World of Greyhawk campaign setting and the Dungeons & Dragons game itself originated. Gygax wrote about his experiences in this game in what would later be called "one of the foundations of our favorite hobby," by Dungeon magazine Editor-in-Chief, Erik Mona. Gygax's article was written for the May issue of Wargamer's Digest, and was later reprinted in the Dungeon issue which acted as sequel and rules update to the original module in July 2004.

The publication contains versions of Gygax's characters, Mordenkainen the Mage, Yrag the Lord, Riggby the Patriarch and Bigby the Wizard, but is designed to allow the introduction of the players' own characters if they wish.

Some iconic creatures of the Dungeons & Dragons game were first introduced in the pre-commercial version of this adventure in the 1970s such as the Iron Golem which claimed the lives of two of Gygax's characters, and was inspired by the Conan the Barbarian books by Robert E. Howard.

In 2004 the module was updated to the 3.5 edition rules by Robert J. Kuntz, Erik Mona and James Jacobs (with some advisory material provided by Gary Gygax), and re-titled "Maure Castle." Dungeon magazine typically contains 3 adventures and a number of columns. Issue #112 was dominated by the updated module, and contained no other adventures. The module itself was preceded by a reprint of the 1974 article/short story "Swords and Sorcery - In Wargaming" by Gary Gygax, which introduced Dungeons & Dragons. Robert Kuntz followed this adventure up with "Chambers of Antiquities" in Dungeon #124, and "The Greater Halls" in Dungeon #139.

== Reception ==
Rick Swan reviewed the adventure in The Space Gamer #73. Swan noted that this module's "action is non-stop and there is no chance for your attention to wander" and felt that the "module is a breeze to run and can accommodate any element you wish to add or subtract. Hack-and-slashers don't come any slicker than this." Swan felt that "Moredenkainen has little to offer experienced D&D players," but it is more appropriate for younger, inexperienced players.

Chris Hunter reviewed the module for Imagine magazine, giving it a mixed review. He called it a "dungeon in the traditional sense" and quoted Gygax's preface, describing it as 'mainly hack and slay'. Hunter criticized "the feel of an early generation dungeon, having traps with no real explanation; instant kill encounters" and logical errors such as allowing the dungeon's denizens no exit past the unopenable doors that seal it. He felt that the module was "not a bad one-off bit of high level fun" but he would not use it in a campaign of his own.

Lawrence Schick, in his 1991 book Heroic Worlds, called this adventure "A three-level dungeon in the classic mode." Dungeon Magazine #112 won the 2005 Gold ENnie for Best Adventure. Dungeon Master For Dummies lists the "Maure Castle" adventure from Dungeon #112 as one of the Ten Best Dungeon Magazine Adventures.
