= Serten =

Serten may refer to:

- Atenolol, a beta blocker drug, trade name Serten
- Serten (Greyhawk), a character in the Greyhawk Dungeons & Dragons setting
