= Faceless One =

Faceless One may refer to:

- A fictional character in the Age of Worms Adventure Path for Dungeons & Dragons
- A fictional character which is a member of the Kt'kn race in Marvel Comics
- A fictional character in the Skulduggery Pleasant series of novels
- A fictional race within World of Warcraft
