= Tenser =

Fictional archmage from Dungeons & Dragons

- World of Greyhawk character

In-universe information
- Race: Human
- Gender: Male
- Class: Wizard 16/Archmage 5
- Alignment: Lawful Good
- Home: Magepoint

In the World of Greyhawk campaign setting for the Dungeons & Dragons roleplaying game, Tenser is an archmage who strives to rid the Flanaess of evil. Tenser is a former member of both the Citadel of Eight and the Circle of Eight.

In Dungeon's Age of Worms adventure path, Tenser is referred to as "Manzorian".

== Creative origins ==
Tenser, an anagram of "Ernest", was initially a wizard player character created and played by Gary Gygax's son Ernie, one of the first two characters that players used in the game now known as Dungeons & Dragons. In the fall of 1972, Gary Gygax was working to create rules for a new type of game based on a demonstration he had been given by Dave Arneson. To provide a playtest environment in which to develop these rules, Gygax designed his own castle, "Castle Greyhawk", and prepared the first level of a dungeon that lay beneath it. Two of his children, Ernie and Elise, were the first players, and Ernie rolled up a wizard, Tenser. During the evening, the children fought and destroyed the first monsters of the Greyhawk dungeon; Gygax recalled this as either being some giant centipedes or a nest of scorpions. During the same session, Ernie and Elise also found the first treasure, a chest of 3,000 copper coins (which was too heavy to carry, much to the children's disappointment). After his children had gone to bed, Gygax immediately began to work on the second level of the dungeon.

The next night, Don Kaye and Rob and Terry Kuntz joined in, rolling up the characters Murlynd, Robilar and Terik respectively. In the following weeks and months, Tenser often adventured with Robilar and Terik. At one point, using their combined forces of loyal henchmen, the three controlled access to the first level of the Greyhawk dungeons while they ransacked the lower levels. Eventually Tenser became the second character to reach the 13th (and at the time, the bottom level) of the Greyhawk dungeons, when he noticed that Robilar was missing and went in search of him. Gary Gygax "borrowed" Tenser's name for two spells, Tenser's floating disc and Tenser's transformation.

When Gygax was forced out of TSR in 1985, he lost the rights to most of his characters, except those that were anagrams of his own name. Tenser is one of the famous mages whose spells were included in the 1988 Greyhawk Adventures hardbound. Tenser was reintroduced as a member of a repurposed Circle of Eight in 1989 in The City of Greyhawk boxed set, where he appeared as part of a cabal of nine wizards, including himself, who sought to balance the forces of Good and Evil in the world. When TSR decided to reboot the World of Greyhawk campaign setting in 1991, the storyline of the setting moved forward a decade to 585 CY, the year after the end of a continental war called the Greyhawk Wars. In events described in the new storyline, Rary and Tenser's old adventuring partner Robilar has attempted to destroy the Circle of Eight and succeeded in murdering Tenser and Otiluke. This was the end of Tenser until TSR was bought by Wizards of the Coast and the Greyhawk storyline was once again revised. This time, in Roger E. Moore's D&D adventure Return of the Eight (1998) the players meet the surviving members of the Circle of Eight (now called the "Circle of Five" because it was missing Tenser, Otiluke and Rary). If the players successfully finish the adventure, Tenser is rescued from death (although he refuses to rejoin the Circle).

== Description ==
Tenser is medium-sized, with brown hair and an aquiline nose. He is always dressed in blue. He is polite and outgoing but is willing to enforce his will on others for the sake of Law and Good.

== Relationships ==
Tenser is a close friend of Jallarzi Sallavarian and Cymria. Agath of Thrunch often meets him at his fortress.

== Home ==
Tenser makes his home in the Fortress of Unknown Depths on the southern shore of the Nyr Dyv, near the village of Magepoint, only a few days' ride from the Free City of Greyhawk.

== History ==
Tenser was born 525 CY, purportedly in the Wild Coast town of Fax. At some point after 551 CY, he was recruited by Mordenkainen and Bigby to join the Citadel of Eight. After the death of his good friend and fellow Citadel member Serten in 569 CY, the Citadel dissolved. Tenser joined forces with Bigby and Mordenkainen once more in 574 CY when he joined the Circle of Eight, replacing Leomund.

In 570 CY, Tenser accompanied Bigby and Neb Retnar beneath Greyhawk Castle in an unsuccessful attempt to prevent Robilar, Riggby, and Quij from freeing the demigod Iuz.

In 579 CY, Robilar sacked the Temple of Elemental Evil, freeing the demoness Zuggtmoy in the process. In retribution, Tenser, Otis, Rufus, and Burne led an army of good-aligned forces in pursuit of his former companion, following him back to his castle and laying siege to it, defeating his armies and driving them from the Domain of Greyhawk to the Pomarj.

In 581 CY, Tenser accompanied Bigby, Drawmij, Jallarzi Sallavarian, Nystul, Otiluke, Otto, and Rary to the tomb of Halmadar the Cruel. Every member of the party died that day, though they were brought back to life later through the agency of clone spells.

The Circle was betrayed in 584 CY, when Tenser, Bigby, and Otiluke discovered a plan by the Circle's own Rary to slay a number of diplomats assembled in Greyhawk to sign the treaty ending the Greyhawk Wars. Unfortunately, Rary witnessed their discovery, and a great magical battle ensued, resulting in the deaths of Otiluke and Tenser, and severely wounding Bigby, who was unable to pursue Rary as he escaped. Word later came that Rary's allies, among them former Citadel member Lord Robilar, had ensured Tenser's and Otiluke's deaths by destroying every clone they had prepared for such an incident. Rary and Robilar fled to the Bright Desert, southeast of Greyhawk, where they established the Empire of the Bright Lands.

However, Rary and Robilar had failed to discover a clone Tenser had hidden away on Celene, one of Oerth's moons, and in Goodmonth of 585 CY Tenser was restored to life. Though he was welcomed back into the Circle, Tenser refused.

== Spells ==
Two of Tenser's eponymous spells, Tenser's Floating Disc and Tenser's Transformation, appear in the 3.5 Edition Player's Handbook. Other spells that he developed, described in such second-edition supplements as Greyhawk Adventures, include:

- Tenser's Brawl
- Tenser's Deadly Strike
- Tenser's Destructive Resonance
- Tenser's Eye of the Eagle
- Tenser's Eye of the Tiger
- Tenser's Flaming Blade
- Tenser's Floating Disc, Greater
- Tenser's Fortunes of War
- Tenser's Giant Strength
- Tenser's Hunting Hawk
- Tenser's Master of Arms
- Tenser's Primal Fury
- Tenser's Running Warrior
- Tenser's Staff of Smiting
- Tenser's Steady Aim

== Writings ==
Tenser is known to have authored the following works:

- Evolution of the Arcane Will Power
- Magical Properties of Gemstones
- Magical Properties of Herbs and Flowers
- Occult Properties of Gemstones
- Theory of the Invisible Forces

== Reception ==
David M. Ewalt called the character of Tenser "something of a D&D celebrity", due to the spells Gary Gygax named after him, and due to the character's appearances "in a number of Greyhawk campaign sourcebooks".
