= Free City of Greyhawk =

Fictional city-state in Dungeons & Dragons

Free City of Greyhawk Domain of Greyhawk
- World of Greyhawk location
- First appearance: The World of Greyhawk
- Created by: Gary Gygax
- Genre: Role-playing game

In-universe information
- Type: City-state
- Ruled by: Lord Mayor Nerof Gasgal (571–)
- Races: Humans (OSfbr) 79%, halflings (lightfoot) 9%, gnomes 5%, elves (sylvan) 3%, dwarves 2%, half-elves 1%, half-orcs 1%
- Location: Central Flanaess
- Locations: Elmshire, Greyhawk, Hardby, Narwell, Safeton
- Population: 160,000
- Motto: Gem of the Flanaess, City of Hawks, City of Thieves
- Government: Oligarchy
- Capital: Free City of Greyhawk
- Provinces: One metropolis, 2 small cities, 2 large towns, and several villages and manorial estates owing fealty to the oligarchy

The Free City of Greyhawk, also known as Greyhawk City and the "Gem of the Flanaess", is a fictional city-state in the World of Greyhawk campaign setting for the Dungeons & Dragons fantasy roleplaying game. Since the setting was originally published in a folio and then again in a boxed set that were both titled World of Greyhawk, the word "Greyhawk" is often used to describe the entire campaign world setting, although the proper name for that part of the world is the Flanaess. Sometimes the lands controlled by the Free City are also referred to as Greyhawk, though the proper term for the region is the Domain of Greyhawk.

== Early development ==
In 1972, after seeing a demonstration of Dave Arneson's Castle Blackmoor game, game designer Gary Gygax agreed with Arneson to co-develop a set of rules for a game that would eventually become known as Dungeons & Dragons. Gygax liked the idea of a castle and dungeon that players could explore, and created his own imaginary place called Castle Greyhawk, which he used to test and develop the game.

About a month after his first session, Gygax created the nearby city of Greyhawk, where the players' characters could sell their treasure and find a place to rest. The lands around Greyhawk gradually grew into an entire world as Gygax's players explored further and further afield.

In 1980, Gygax published details of his home campaign in a folio called The World of Greyhawk. This was the first published information about the City of Greyhawk.

The Free City of Greyhawk, Gem of the Flanaess, is the adventuring town that gives the World of Greyhawk setting its name. Game designer Ken Rolston comments: "The City of Greyhawk is an organism of systems within systems, with each system driven by its own motivations and personalities. [...] External politics are intertwined in the city’s internal affairs. Rival guilds compete for power and influence, and dark conspiracies fester beneath the streets, while less-weighty adventures may arise from the lighter aspects of civilized personal and commercial rivalries."

The release of The World of Greyhawk (1980) was intended to begin a new focus on the campaign world of Greyhawk, with plans for Minifigs of the UK to create an "Armies of Greyhawk" miniatures ruleset, and TSR to produce a "City of Greyhawk" folio, but none of these publications appeared.

== Publication history ==
Greyhawk: Gem of the Flanaess from The City of Greyhawk boxed set (TSR, Inc., 1989); Cover art by Erik Olson

In 1983, TSR, Inc. replaced the folio edition with the World of Greyhawk boxed set, which contained more detailed information about the city and some of its prominent citizens, as well as background information for several small adventures set in the city.

By 1983, Gygax was planning a City of Greyhawk publication to be followed by a Castle Greyhawk publication, both to come after the World of Greyhawk Fantasy Game Setting (1983), although the intended revival of Greyhawk began slowed down after 1984. Gygax never completed his work on the Castle and City of Greyhawk or the Wild Coast. The first Greyhawk novel by Gygax was Saga of Old City (1985), which "became a major source of Greyhawk lore because novelistic details about currencies and the feel of the city of Greyhawk immediately surpassed anything that had ever been printed in RPG supplements," according to author Shannon Appelcline.

In 1985, just before Gary Gygax was forced out of TSR, he wrote the first two Gord the Rogue novels, which provide many interesting details of the city of Greyhawk and its seamy underworld.

With Gygax gone, the vision of the city became TSR's, and in 1988, the company published Jim Ward's Greyhawk Adventures hardcover source book, which provided additional information regarding the city as well as interesting characters living within it.

The City of Greyhawk boxed set published by TSR in 1989 is the most complete treatment of the Free City. The box contained

- Gem of the Flanaess—A Gazetteer of the Free City of Greyhawk and the surrounding area by Douglas Niles, a 96-page book
- Folks, Feuds and Factions: The good, the bad, and the in-between—People who make the city what it is a 96-page book by Carl Sargent and Rik Rose,
- three maps (city streets, city sewers, and the region surrounding Greyhawk)
- a wall poster of the city
- 23 "adventure cards", double-sided 8½ x 11 pieces of card stock containing the outline of an adventure in the city

The following year, in conjunction with this boxed set, TSR published a trilogy of adventure modules by Richard and Anne Brown —WGA1 Falcon's Revenge, WGA2 Falconmaster and WGA3 Flames of the Falcon—set in the city and centred around a mysterious villain called "The Falcon".

The two long-awaited Greyhawk supplements appeared after Gygax left TSR: The City of Greyhawk (1989) box presented a detailed look at the city, while WGR1: Greyhawk Ruins (1990) presented a serious look at the dungeons under Greyhawk Castle. Appelcline commented on the Greyhawk setting after Gygax left TSR: "TSR published only scattered RPG supplements until AD&D second edition, which saw the publication of the beautiful The City of Greyhawk (1989) box and the WGR1: Greyhawk Ruins (1990) book. Neither of these locales had much in common with the original locations created by Gygax and Kuntz almost 20 years prior, showing how Greyhawk continued to metamorphize and change — though James M. Ward and some of players of those early games did try to get the feel right. Around the same time, TSR published Robin Wayne Bailey’s Nightwatch (1990) novel, which was set in Greyhawk City but didn't feature the "Greyhawk Adventures" trade dress at all — showing the weakness of the setting at TSR."

The fourth module of the WGA (World of Greyhawk Adventures) series, WGA4Vecna Lives!, was not part of the Falcon series, but was set in Greyhawk City. Treasures of Greyhawk (1992) and Return of the Eight (1998) were two others set entirely within the city.

The Campaign Book from the 1992 boxed set From the Ashes, focuses on the areas in and around the Free City of Greyhawk, which game designer Rick Swan described as "a virtuoso performance, with a flawless mix of exposition, atmosphere, and detail [...] painting a bleak picture of a struggling populace. As a consequence of the great war, much of the Old City was incinerated. Destitute property owners who can’t afford to pay for restoration watch helplessly as their neighborhoods are overrun with beggars and street urchins. In the River Quarter, authorities fish out body after body with daggers in their backs. Refugees crowd the poorer districts, trade continues to decline, and Iuz, the fiendish ruler of a vast territory in the north central Flanaess, remains a constant threat. Uncertainty prevails, and player characters will find plenty to keep them on their toes." The set moved the timeline of the overall World of Greyhawk setting ten years forward to just after the Greyhawk Wars, included information regarding the city's situation, as well as additional adventure cards set in the city.

After TSR was taken over by Wizards of the Coast, the World of Greyhawk setting was updated again, and publications of this time period such as Greyhawk: The Adventure Begins (1998), the Living Greyhawk Gazetteer (2000), and Expedition to the Ruins of Greyhawk (2007) also provide information regarding the city in the post-wars period.

=== Outside of TSR ===
New Infinities Productions revealed in 1988 that its "Fantasy Master" line had plans to detail both the Castle and City of Greyhawk (renamed as "Castle Dunfalcon") presented in the original form that Gary Gygax and Rob Kuntz had envisioned them, but the company dissolved before any of this went into publication; Applelcline noted that "Gygax's plans to publish the City and Dungeon of Greyhawk in a renamed setting were somewhat fulfilled at Troll Lord Games, who published a few Castle Zagyg books — detailing the uppermost levels of the dungeon — before Gygax's death."

== Summary of published information about the city ==
The following represents a summary of information taken from the various published sources mentioned above that a player would be able to use:

=== History ===
==== Early history ====
Greyhawk, named for the small grey hawks which populate the region, was originally a trading outpost on the Selintan River specializing in local wood and woven garments. In time the town developed strong textile and meat-packing industries. Eventually, Greyhawk came to be ruled by a warlord, who took the title "Lansgraf of the Selintan". His son was then married to the Gynarch of Hardby's daughter. The nuptials formalized a political alliance that served as the basis for rule over the Lanstadt of Selintan, an area that eventually became known as the Domain of Greyhawk.

In 4 CY, Greyhawk came under the domination of the Great Kingdom of Aerdy and remained so while strong Overkings ruled from the Malachite Throne in Rauxes. By the 3rd century CY, the Great Kingdom's influence over the city began to wane as the Overkings fell into evil ways and their hold on distant provinces became increasingly tenuous.

==== Rise to prominence, decline and recovery ====
Circa 310 CY, the mage Zagig Yragerne emerged from the Wild Coast and bribed his way into a seat on the Directing Oligarchy. Soon after, the Oligarchs elected Zagig Lord Mayor.

Greyhawk subsequently rose in fame and prominence under the leadership of Lord Mayor Zagig. He instituted legal reform, developed a new currency, fortified the walls, founded the city's first university and embarked on a major building program. Most notably, he directed the construction of nearby Castle Greyhawk.

Although Zagig—later known as Zagyg—became increasingly erratic over time, his rule is generally considered to be the most effective in the Free City's history and brought widespread prosperity to the region. Much to the annoyance of Dyvers and other rival cities, Zagig proclaimed Greyhawk to be the "Gem of the Flanaess", and did much to ensure this moniker was justified. Unfortunately, the "Mad Archmage" suddenly disappeared in 421 CY, leaving no clues regarding his whereabouts, and no heir to inherit the title of Lansgraf.

In 498 CY, after decades of Zagig's absence, the Lanstadt was therefore abolished, the title of Lansgraf permanently retired, and the Free City's Directing Oligarchy assumed political authority. The new Lord Mayor Paerinn officially proclaimed Greyhawk a free city, though it had been effectively independent of the Great Kingdom's rule for over a century.

Soon thereafter, the city lost its claim over Hardby and the Wild Coast, as the leading women of Hardby broke from Greyhawk and established the ruling office of Despotrix. This loss of lands sent the Free City into economic decline, a situation that persisted for several decades. Fortunately, the discovery of treasure in the dungeons beneath Castle Greyhawk and other nearby locales set off a gold rush of sorts, and Greyhawk's economic fortunes recovered substantially in the second half of the 6th century.

==== The Greyhawk Wars and the post-war situation ====
The Free City of Greyhawk actually had less direct involvement in the so-called Greyhawk Wars than many political entities across the Flanaess, but because the final truce was brokered in Greyhawk in CY 584, the war has come to be named for the city.

The current timeline of the Greyhawk campaign has been fixed as 591 CY, six years after the end of the Greyhawk Wars. The Wars had several important effects on the city, particularly that the unrest drove Hardby and the Wild Coast cities of Safeton and Narwell to re-submit to the rule of the Directing Oligarchs. However, since it was largely fear of Turrosh Mak's humanoid raiders from the Pomarj that prompted this move, a situation that has been resolved to some extent, the Despotrix and the Wild Coast cities are once again agitating for increased independence.

Also as a result of the Wars, the city has seen an influx of new citizens. Some of these are wealthy diplomats, and some are "nobles" who have contributed significantly to Greyhawk's coffers with the purchase of various counterfeit titles and documents. But many newcomers to Greyhawk are destitute refugees, or are merely using the city as a base for hatching political plots and intrigues across the Flanaess. In particular, there are persistent rumors of covert Scarlet Brotherhood operations in the city.

The post-war outlook for the Free City is therefore mixed. Greyhawk's finances are in the best shape they have been since Zagig's departure, but the city faces significant challenges arising from political instability and increasing criminal activity.

=== Geography ===
The Free City of Greyhawk is located centrally in the Flanaess, which is the easternmost part of the continent of Oerik on the world of Oerth. The city controls a large swath of land along the Selintan River from the Nyr Dyv south to Woolly Bay most of the Cairn Hills, parts of the Gnarley Forest, the northern Wild Coast, and parts of the Abbor-Alz. The entire region is officially known as the Domain of Greyhawk. The Domain is bordered on the east by the Abbor-Alz and its western border lies within the Gnarley Forest. The area south of Greyhawk City along the Selintan is known as the Plain of Greyhawk.

==== Settlements ====
Several settlements fall within the Domain of Greyhawk:

- Blackstone
- Diamond Lake
- Elmshire
- Ery Crossings
- Erybend
- Greatrock
- Greyhawk City
- Greysmere
- Grossetgrottel
- Hardby
- Magepoint
- Narwell
- One Ford
- Phandlish
- Safeton
- Steaming Springs
- Two Ford

=== People ===
==== Population ====
As of 589 CY, the city itself boasted a population of 69,500, making it one of the largest cities on Oerth. The population for the entire Greyhawk Domain is roughly 160,000, including the larger towns of Safeton (pop. 6,100), Hardby (pop. 5,100) and Elmshire (pop. 4,000).

==== Religion ====
The Free City of Greyhawk hosts temples and shrines to many deities, including Beory, Boccob, Celestian, Corellon Larethian, Ehlonna, Fharlanghn, Garl Glittergold, Heironeous, Istus, Kord, Kurell, Lirr, Moradin, Norebo, Obad-Hai, Olidammara, Osprem, Pelor, Pholtus, Procan, Ralishaz, Rao, Saint Cuthbert, Trithereon, Ulaa, Wee Jas, Xerbo, Yondalla, and Zilchus. The worship of evil deities and fiends is forbidden, and such cults, though they may have followers, do not have a public presence. Evil religions that have established a base in the city in recent memory include those of Incabulos, Iuz, Nerull, and Vecna.

Many more deities are worshipped in other settlements of the Domain of Greyhawk. See also: List of Greyhawk deities

==== Languages ====
The most widely spoken language in Greyhawk City and most of the Domain is Common, though other tongues are spoken in settlements with large non-human populations, such as Elmshire, Greysmere, and Grossetgrottel.

=== Government ===
==== Administrative Divisions ====
The Domain of Greyhawk has no officially named provinces. Some of the region's settlements are under the direct rule of the Free City, while others have varying degrees of autonomy. Notable settlements include:

- The Free City of Greyhawk
- Blackstone -A mining town in the Cairn Hills directly controlled by Greyhawk City
- Diamond Lake - A mining town in the Cairn Hills directly controlled by Greyhawk City
- Elmshire - A large halfling town on the Nyr Dyv, east of the Selintan
- Greysmere - A dwarven stronghold south of the Mistmarsh
- Grossetgrottel - A gnome warren located in the northwestern Cairn Hills
- Hardby - A small, virtually autonomous port city on Woolly Bay, east of the Selintan
- Magepoint - A coastal village east of Elmshire, under the protection of Tenser the archmage
- Narwell - A large inland town on the former Wild Coast
- Safeton - A small port city on the former Wild Coast, virtually under martial law
- Steaming Springs - A mining town in the Cairn Hills directly controlled by Greyhawk City

==== Executive branch ====
Greyhawk's Directing Oligarchy elects one of its own to as Lord Mayor, who serves as the head of state in addition to his directorial duties. The current Lord Mayor, Nerof Gasgal, has held office since 571 CY. The Lord Mayor heads both the Directing Oligarchy and the Council of Mayors and Manorial Lords. The chief of state also officially heads the military, though actual command is most often left to the Captain General of the Watch.

==== Legislative branch ====
The Free City of Greyhawk is ruled by the Directing Oligarchy, an executive council of twelve to eighteen members representing the city's major professional guilds and the military. In some cases, the Oligarchy may include important wizards or clerics. New Directors are chosen by current council members when a vacancy must be filled.

The Greyhawk Council of Mayors and Manorial Lords is an annual assembleage of leaders from the various baronies and towns in Greyhawk Domain. In theory, this gathering allows citizens of the Domain to have a voice in the governance of the region, but in practice this council has little real authority.

==== Judicial branch ====
Major legal matters in the Free City of Greyhawk are adjudicated by a Judge of Greyhawk, one of eight such officials appointed by the Directing Oligarchy. One of these eight is chosen to serve as Chief judge of Greyhawk, a position currently held by Sir Anton Palmirian who also sits on the Directing Oligarchy and oversees the Guild of Lawyers and Scribes. In cases of great import, three Judges of Greyhawk may preside. Appeals of major cases are always heard by a panel of three Judges of Greyhawk, though the Lord Mayor sometimes sits in place of one of the Judges.

Lesser matters in Greyhawk City are tried by magistrates from the Guild of Lawyers and Scribes.

==== Heraldry ====
The city's coat of arms is blazoned thus: Sable, a castle triple-towered argent, in chief two chains each of four links chevronwise of the second, in base six bezants.

=== Economy ===
==== Resources ====
The Free City of Greyhawk controls most of the Cairn Hills, which provide the domain with great mineral wealth, such as iron, gems, and silver.

Nearby Castle Greyhawk, with its extensive dungeons, draws adventurers and traders to the Domain of Greyhawk from across the Flanaess. As such, the Castle generates significant economic benefits for the City in trade, taxation and treasure.

==== Currency ====
The Domain of Greyhawk's standard coinage consists of the platinum plate (pp), gold orb (gp), electrum lucky (ep), silver noble (sp), and copper common (cp). All of the coins are round, except for the platinum plate, which is square. The current coinage system replaced the previous system, which included coinage worth less than the copper common known as bronze zees, brass bits, and iron drabs.

=== Transportation ===
Several roads link the settlements of the Domain of Greyhawk, including the High Road (from Greyhawk City to Elmshire), the Urnst Trail (from the High Road to the Duchy of Urnst), the Western Road (from Ford Keep on the Selintan to Dyvers), and the River Road (south from Greyhawk City along the Selintan).

Much river traffic takes place along the Selintan River, which can accommodate all but the largest sea-going vessels from the Nyr Dyv and Woolly Bay. Smaller vessels ply the Ery and Neen rivers.

==== Able Carter ====
The Able Carter is a coach company created by author Erik Mona, which first appeared in the 2000 RPGA adventure module, River of Blood. It has coaching inns in Greyhawk City, Hardby, Diamond Lake, Blackstone, Elmshire, Steaming Springs, Narwell, Safeton, and Dyvers, among other locations.

=== Military ===
The Domain of Greyhawk's military forces, though technically under the Lord Mayor's authority, are usually commanded by the Domain's highest-ranking military officer, the Captain General of the Watch, who also sits on the city's Directing Oligarchy. The current Captain General is Tigran Gellner.

Greyhawk's forces consist of several units, including:

- The Cairn Hills Force, led by Commander Schinus Balint.
- The Greyhawk Mountaineers, led by Commander Carstane Geronten.
- The Hardby Marines, led by Commander Wilbrem Carister.
- The Narwell Headhunters.
- The Safeton Garrison, led by Commander Turin Deathstalker.
- The "Water Rats."
