= List of Greyhawk characters =

This is a list of characters from the Greyhawk campaign setting for the Dungeons & Dragons fantasy role-playing game.

== A ==
=== Acererak ===
Acererak
- World of Greyhawk character

In-universe information
- Race: Half-fiend human
- Gender: Male
- Class: Wizard
- Alignment: Evil
- Home: Vast Swamp

Acererak /əˈsɛrəræk/ ə-SERR-ə-rak was a powerful wizard who became a lich, and later a demilich.

==== Publication history ====
"Greyhawk has long been associated with Acererak", who first appears in the original Tomb of Horrors adventure (1978) by Gary Gygax as the main adversary. One of the areas in the Tomb is a "Chapel of Evil", described as "obviously some form of temple area - there are scenes of normal life painted on the walls, but the people have rotting flesh, skeletal hands, worms eating them, etc." The adventure described him as "a human magic-user/cleric of surpassing evil" who took the steps necessary to preserve his life force as the lich, Acererak." The boxed set adventure Return to the Tomb of Horrors (1998) by Bruce Cordell included a small booklet titled "The Journal of the Tomb", which notes that the character Desatysso discovered that Acererak "owed much of his power" to Tenebrous. Cordell's article "Return to the Tomb of Horrors" in Dragon #249 (July 1998) mentions that "While alive, Acererak built an unholy temple to a now deceased power. When the project neared completion, he slew every worker, excavator, and consecrating priest who had assisted in the temple's construction." The article notes that the result of Acererak's work was the dungeon crawl detailed in the Tomb of Horrors module. In the article "Open Grave" by Bart Carroll and Steve Winters for the "D&D Alumni" column in Dragon #371 (January 2009), the authors interviewed Bruce Cordell about the Return to the Tomb of Horrors adventure, where he revealed that he developed the origins of Acererak "as a persecuted tiefling child to his development as a wizard and priest of Orcus, to his creation of his tomb that was actually a test to winnow souls". The fourth edition adventure also titled Tomb of Horrors (2010) by Ari Marmell and Scott Fitzgerald Gray mentions in the introduction that "Acererak resurfaced as a worshiper of Orcus, using the cult's resources to construct a number of lairs and tombs - the most infamous of which would become known as the Tomb of Horrors. Some sources claim that Acererak was using Orcus's worshipers to complete his own schemes, and that he felt no true loyalty to the demon prince." The introduction goes on to say that "Once he attained lichdom, Acererak ceased paying homage to Orcus, lending credence to the notion that his worship had never been more than a means to an end." An artistic rendition by Tyler Jacobson of "Acererak the archlich graces the cover of the 5th edition Dungeon Master's Guide. Acererak is featured in the novel Ready Player One by Ernest Cline.

==== Relationships ====
Acererak is the son and ally of the balor Tarnhem, a worshipper of Orcus, and an apprentice of Vecna. In life, he was the enemy of a paladin of Pelor named Pentivel, and the wizard-architect who designs his tomb is called Morghadam. He is revered by a group of wizards known as the Covenenticle of Acererak. The necromancers of Skull City, former followers of Acererak, go on to form a group known as the Votaries of Vecna, making a new home in the Black Spire on the Plane of Shadow.

The githyanki necromancer Kastya Zurith-Movya seeks to return the true Acererak to existence as an ally against his people's lich-queen.

==== Home ====
The Tomb of Horrors is long Acererak's home in undeath. As a demilich, he moves to the demiplane of Moil to complete his grand plans.

There is a shrine of Acererak, in the form of a five-foot statue of a humanoid skull, on the second layer of Pandemonium.

==== History ====
Acererak the Devourer is described as a cambion, the result of an ancient conjurer summoning a demon, a balor named Tarnhem, far beyond his ability to control. Tarnhem devours the conjurer and takes his human mother by force.

Acererak's mother survives her son's birth, but she is killed by a torch-wielding mob ten years later. The boy is rescued by none other than Vecna, the Whispered One, who kills the advisors urging him to kill the child; instead, he takes on the half-demon as an apprentice. Even then, ten-year-old Acererak loathes life, looking forward to becoming undead like his master. During Vecna's siege of Fleeth, the lich is severely wounded and rescued by Acererak. Vecna subsequently promotes the cambion.

It is unknown if Acererak is present when Vecna is betrayed by Kas the Bloody-Handed in the fourth century before the Common Year, but at some point, he moves to the Vast Swamp where he constructs a lair for himself, colloquially known as the Tomb of Horrors (and described in an adventure module of the same name). While still alive, Acererak builds a subterranean temple complex in the name of Orcus, burying its architect and all of its workers within. Eventually, Acererak succumbs to the lure of lichcraft, and has himself buried in a labyrinthine tomb, where he commits himself to his studies and, eventually, demilichdom, abandoning his body for the planes beyond. Many adventurers over the years attempt to raid Acererak's tomb, but it is believed that none are able to destroy him, despite some claims.

The sequel module Return to the Tomb of Horrors retconned and expanded on the setting. At some point, a group of necromancers settle the area outside the tomb, creating a community of sorts known as Skull City. Acererak's tomb is revealed to be a mere antechamber to the demilich's true dwelling, the lost city of Moil on the border of the Negative Energy Plane, where he had spent thousands of years working on a process to fuse his essence with the plane and gain control over all undead throughout the multiverse.

According to the 3rd edition Tome of Magic, Acererak, following his destruction by adventurers completing the Tomb of Horrors, passes on to become a vestige - an ineffable, amoral entity which can be summoned and bound by characters known as Binders. Acererak grants his summoner lich-like powers, including immunity to cold and the ability to speak with the dead.

According to the adventure "Prisoner of the Castle Perilous," Acererak created a simulacrum in the Negative Energy Plane to torment Saint Pentivel, an old foe from his mortal life. This simulacrum eventually transforms itself into a complete being through the aid of an artifact known as the Soul Machine.

In 4th edition D&D, Acererak appears in the book Open Grave: Secrets of the Undead as a member of the Undead Hall of Infamy. He also features in a sidequest in the adventure Revenge of the Giants and in the 4th edition remake of Tomb of Horrors as central antagonist.

==== Other ====
Acererak is referenced in a piece of Omega Tech in a Gamma World adventure, Factory of Misfit Omega Tech, specifically the Hunting Knife of Acererak. Its hilt is studded with green and red soul gems.

Acererak is also referenced in the novel Hero written by R.A. Salvatore, released in 2016. The reference is made when talking about Malcanthet, the Queen of the Succubi, and the deal she had made with Acererak involving a demonic mirror that traps souls. Acererak uses those souls to feed his undeath.

==== Reception ====
Chroniclers of the art of Dungeons & Dragons Michael Witwer et al. counted Acererak among the characters who gained iconic status through the history of the game.

=== Aegwareth ===
Aegwareth is a human shade. A former Elder Hierophant Druid, Aegwareth lived at White Plume Mountain until -800 CY, when he was slain by the wizard Keraptis, who took White Plume mountain for himself. Aegwarth now exists as a shade.

=== Alhamazad the Wise ===
Alhamazad the Wise is a powerful human wizard of Baklunish descent, and one of the newest members of the Circle of Eight. He is an elderly Baklunish man who walks with a limp, dresses in plain robes, and covers his shaved head with a simple turban. Alhamazad is a good friend of Mordenkainen, whom he has known for over twenty years. He is wary of Drawmij, and holds great antipathy for Warnes Starcoat. Kermin Mind-Bender of the Boneheart once served as Alhamazad's apprentice, but the two are now enemies.

=== Animal Lord ===
Animals Lords are powerful creatures of neutral good alignment that live on the Outer Plane of the Beastlands. In the game, each animal lord is a humanoid being, powerful like a celestial paragon or demon prince, that represents all animals of its chosen type. For example, there is a Mouse Lord, a Lizard Lord, and a Hawk Lord. The most well-known animal lord is Rexfelis, the Cat Lord.

=== Arnd ===
Arnd, also known as Arnd of Tdon, was a legendary Oeridian hero who lived ages ago, before the Great Migrations. "A humble priest from the south," he is famed for establishing the first paladins of Heironeous among the Oeridian tribes. He is also known as a possessor (in more ways than one) of the artifact known as the Invulnerable Coat of Arnd, which he wore while leading a rebellion against the wizard Virtos. It is said that Arnd's spirit still inhabits the armor that bears his name, attempting to aid the poor whenever possible. Arnd is credited with writing Unknown Movements of the Universe, a wizardly spellbook. However, as a priest Arnd is probably not the author of the book in question, unless he was multi-classed. It is possible there was a wizard called Arnd separate from the legendary priest. Arnd of Tdon was named after Don Arndt, a player in the first Greyhawk campaign.

== B ==
=== Bigby ===
Bigby was created by Rob Kuntz as a low-level non-player character evil wizard in the early dungeons of Greyhawk in 1973. Gary Gygax's character, the wizard Mordenkainen, encountered Bigby. The two wizards engaged in combat; Mordenkainen managed to subdue Bigby using a charm spell, and forced Bigby to become his servant. Kuntz ruled that Bigby would be Mordenkainen's servant as long as he remained under the charm spell, but until Gygax, through roleplaying, had won Bigby's loyalty, the evil wizard would remain a non-player character under Kuntz's control. After a long time and several adventures, Mordenkainen managed to convince Bigby to leave his evil ways behind, and Kuntz ruled that it was safe to remove the charm spell, since Bigby had changed from an enemy to a loyal henchman; therefore Gygax could use Bigby as a player character. For a time after this, Kuntz ruled that all the names of Mordenkainen's future henchmen had to rhyme with Bigby. This resulted in Zigby the dwarf; Rigby the cleric; Sigby Griggbyson the fighter; Bigby's apprentice, Nigby; and Digby, who eventually replaced Bigby as Mordenkainen's new apprentice.

Thereafter, Gygax developed Bigby into a powerful wizard second only to Mordenkainen, and eventually Bigby became one of the original members of Gygax's Circle of Eight, a group of adventurers made up of eight of Gygax's own characters.

When Gygax wrote TSR's AD&D Players Handbook, he borrowed Bigby's name to describe a series of "hand" spells (Bigby's crushing hand, Bigby's grasping hand, etc.). This custom continued on in later versions of D&D, with over two dozen "hand" spells eventually ascribed to Bigby.

When Gygax was forced out of TSR in 1985, he lost the rights to most of his characters, including Mordenkainen and Bigby. Bigby is one of the famous mages of the Greyhawk setting whose spells were included in the 1988 Greyhawk Adventures hardbound. Bigby was reintroduced as a member of a repurposed Circle of Eight in 1989 in The City of Greyhawk boxed set, where he appeared as part of a cabal of nine wizards who sought to balance the forces of Good and Evil in the world. He also appeared in the adventure Vecna Lives!, where he was temporarily killed by an ancient warlord armed with the hand and eye of Vecna. When TSR decided to reboot the World of Greyhawk campaign setting in 1991, Carl Sargent moved the storyline of the setting forward a decade to 585 CY, the year after the end of a continental war called the Greyhawk Wars. By this time, Bigby had returned to life via the agency of a clone spell, and was once again a member of the Circle, now known as the Circle of Five after the deaths of Tenser and Otiluke and the treason and departure of Rary.

Bigby remained a potent character in subsequent versions of the Greyhawk setting, which updated the storyline to 591 CY.

=== Bucknard ===
Bucknard is a powerful human wizard, and former member of the Circle of Eight. In Dungeon's Age of Worms adventure path, Bucknard is referred to as "Balakarde". He is described as affable, esteemed, talented and powerful, yet stubborn and headstrong. He has one known sister, Maralee, and is also a former member of the Circle of Eight.

In 556 CY, Bucknard's sister and adventuring companion, Maralee, was slain by sons of Kyuss. Bucknard took her death (and seeing her devoured by ghoulish worms) hard. Depressed for years, he emerged from his depression to become one of the most potent wizards of his generation. He had dedicated himself to one overriding task: the destruction of Kyuss. In 571, Bucknard became one of the founding members of the Circle of Eight, as Mordenkainen invited some of the most prominent mages in the Flanaess to join him in a successor organization to the Citadel of Eight.

At the height of his powers, Bucknard began deeply obsessing over occult manuscripts relating to the Worm God and his cult. He grew increasingly secluded and paranoid, no longer confiding even with close friends like Tenser. Abruptly resigning from the Circle of Eight in 579 CY, he traveled to Alhaster to research his theory that the Ebon Triad cult had been created there as a front for the cult of Kyuss. Lashonna, the town's most knowledgeable expert in the occult, agreed to meet with him and directed him to the Wormcrawl Fissure, where he was captured by Dragotha. The following year, after months of torture, Bucknard finally died at the hands of his own undead sister, upon Dragotha's orders. Bucknard's soul shattered into three separate ghosts, representing his artistic, scholarly, and vengeful sides, which haunted the Fissure for decades afterwards. In 581, Bucknard's position in the Circle was filled by Jallarzi Sallavarian.

Bucknard crafted the magic item Bucknard's Everfull Purse, which is essentially a leather pouch or small bag that refills itself each morning. Each such coin purse can replicate a different number of coins or gems, depending on which type of bag it is.

Gygax made mention of whom this magic item was named after and why in an EN World thread: "Bucknard was an NPC I created out of whole cloth. He was based on a neighbor of mine when I was a lad, a Mr. Bucknall. He had a great garden, an apple tree with five different kinds of apples, and he knew astronomy well, assisted me with my 100 power telescope. He did use a small change purse, and from it he would extract a small coin to give to me now and again."

Bucknard authored Inexplicable Reflections.

== C ==
=== Company of Seven ===
The Company of Seven is an adventuring group whose members later achieved great fame and power in the world of Oerth. While they were together, the Company of Seven explored many worlds and planes, some previously unknown. Several of the company became demigods or hero-deities, and all of the company have spells and magic items named after them. In 318 CY the Company of Seven discovered the lost Flan citadel of Veralos and returned with a wagon-load of wondrous treasures. It is not known when, how, or why the Company of Seven disbanded.

The members of the company were:

- Zagig Yragerne, a master wizard who joined (some say formed) this adventuring group early in his career.
- Keoghtom, a jack of all trades who mastered magic, hunting, alchemy, and the Old Lore of the bards. Keoghtom was Zagig's closest confidante and the most inventive of the group.
- Murlynd, a paladin of Heironeous and an insatiably curious artificer. His grasp of technology improved immeasurably when he traveled to Boot Hill on an unknown Material Plane world, and acquired his famous pair of revolvers.
- Nolzur, a skilled illusionist and alchemist who applied his magic to his incredible artistic ability, creating pigments and paints that allowed him to perform wonders.
- Quaal, a ranger of Flan descent whose interest in useful spells and magic, as opposed to sheer arcane power, served the company in good stead.
- Heward, an accomplished bard whose mastery of both song and spell allowed him to channel powerful magic and incredible music through his instruments.
- Tasha, a young apprentice wizard with a morbid sense of humor. Though few alive know it, Tasha was actually the legendary archmage known today as Iggwilv, who went on to become the Witch-Queen of Perrenland, mother of Iuz, and sometime lover of the demon prince Graz'zt.

=== Cat Lord ===
The Cat Lord, or Master Cat, is the mysterious ruler of cats and a lord of Balance, in the Dungeons & Dragons roleplaying game. The Epic Level Handbook included, as an optional rule, the possibility that he is a quasi-deity. In Gary Gygax's Gord the Rogue series, he is called Rexfelis. The original male Cat Lord first appeared in the original first edition Monster Manual II (1983). As ruler of all cats since that position has existed, the Cat Lord bears the respect and fealty of felines from house cats to smilodons. Even hybrid beings like weretigers and wereleopards are loyal to him. In the Monstrous Compendium for the Planescape setting, the Cat Lord is presented as female.

== D ==
=== Dragotha ===
Dragotha is a powerful undead dragon known as a dracolich and a major player in Dungeon's Age of Worms adventure path. Dragotha was formerly a powerful red dragon, the mightiest consort of Tiamat. At some point Dragotha offended his mistress, and was forced to leave Avernus. Making his way to Oerth, Dragotha fell in with Kyuss, and eventually became a dracolich and Kyuss' greatest servant. Dragotha's lair is thought to lie in the Wormcrawl Fissure, near Rift Canyon.

More historical information is given in the second edition RPGA Adventurer's Guild Tournament module, Dragotha's Lair (Bruce R. Cordell, 1999, 2001). According to this history, Dragotha was forced into quiescence (inactivity) by Keraptis, the infamous wizard featured in the module White Plume Mountain using a magical device called the Crown of Mortality. According to the third edition White Plume Mountain web enhancement "Outside the Mountain is Just as Dangerous as Inside" (Robert Wiese, 2006), Dragotha was a black dragon (not a red dragon, as mentioned above) before becoming undead.

An expedition to Dragotha's lair is told in the song "The Claws of Dragotha", which is believed to have been penned sometime in the 5th century CY. Dragotha is mentioned in a pictorial map featured in the White Plume Mountain module: "Beyond to the lair of Dragotha, the undead dragon where fabulous riches and hideous death await."

=== Drawmij ===
The name "Drawmij" entered Dungeons & Dragons canon through the spell Drawmij's Instant Summons, and was formed by reversing "Jim Ward", the name of one of Gary Gygax's players. By Ward's own account, the spell originated during a session in Gygax's original Greyhawk campaign during which the players were stranded in a dungeon; Ward's character owned a magical item which would have rescued the party, but had left it in an inn before setting out. Ward remarked to Gygax that wizards should have access to a spell which allowed them to recall any item in their possession to their hand; Gygax promptly devised instant summons, which did exactly that.

There has been some confusion over whether Gygax created the name in homage to Ward or Ward's character; though it is known that Ward played a character named Drawmij at one time, some sources claim the name of the wizard he was playing at the time instant summons was created was "Bombidell", not Drawmij. This leaves two theories as to how the name got started:

- Ward named his wizard character "Drawmij" from the outset, and the spell simply used the name of Ward's character.
- Gygax devised the name for publication purposes, as the name "Bombidell" was derivative of the Tolkien character Tom Bombadil, and Ward subsequently created a new character, Drawmij.

Drawmij is 63 years old in 591 CY, although he appears to be a young man in his late twenties or early thirties. His hair is sandy blond and his eyes are so blue that they are nearly purple. He stands six feet tall and weighs 172 pounds. His features possess an undefinable unsettling quality, and more than a few of those who know him have perceived something subtly different about him each time they meet - the shade of his eyes, his height, even the thickness and curl of his hair. Rary calls these his "troubling inconsistencies".

Drawmij wears magical robes of cool colors, favoring elven designs.

For the last decade or so, Drawmij has focused on the theories of chronomancy, magic involving the manipulation of time. He has grown increasingly eccentric of late.

Drawmij is a member of the Circle of Eight. He has a close connection to Duke Luschan of Gradsul, who may be a relative of his. Drawmij also spends time with the Hierophant Sverdras Meno, a druid of the Old Faith who oversees the Azure Sea.

Drawmij has many contacts among the minstrels and bards of Celene, though few in the capital of Enstad admit to knowing him. Drawmij has few known agents, but he knows much more about Keoland and its client states than it seems like he should.

Drawmij has an enduring hatred of Jaran Krimeeah, the Mage of the Valley of the Mage, and is forever trying to persuade other members of the Circle of Eight to help him kill the wily archmage once and for all. Jallarzi Sallavarian has suggested to Otto that Drawmij's true enmity is for Tysiln San, Jaran's mistress, though the reasons for this are unknown.

Drawmij only grudgingly accepted the addition of Warnes Starcoat and Alhamazed to the Circle of Eight, and argued against the inclusion of Theodain Eriason. Since losing that fight, however, he has treated Theodain's presence with bland acceptance.

Drawmij is reputed to live in a cavernous underwater fortress beneath the Azure Sea, 150 miles south of Gradsul in Keoland, where he deals with merfolk, whales, dolphins, and many other denizens of the ocean. This fastness was once the dwelling of the druid Sverdras Meno. He visits the Free City of Greyhawk as little as possible, finding it stifling and distasteful, but visits Gradsul regularly. Drawmij possesses a magical metal boat he can pilot underwater.

=== Drelnza ===
Iggwilv is the mother of the destroyed vampiress Drelnza. In the 570's, Iggwilv had two prominent clashes with the Circle of Eight, who had sent adventurers to thwart her plans. The first took place in the fabled Lost Caverns of Tsojcanth and ended with the destruction of her daughter, the vampiress Drelzna.

The vampire daughter of the archmage Iggwilv, she was trapped in stasis as the guardian of the main treasure in The Lost Caverns of Tsojcanth. After traversing a wilderness and two levels of dungeons, the players face Drelnza, the vampiric daughter of long-deceased archmage Iggwilv. The 20th and final encounter is titled "The Inner Sphere". Here, a "woman sleeps on an alabaster slab." She is "armored from toe to neck in gold chased plate mail." The woman is actually Drelnza, a fighter/vampire and the daughter of Iggwilv. After defeating Drelnza, the players are rewarded with treasure, and the adventure ends.

The Lost Caverns of Tsojcanth was ranked the 22nd-greatest Dungeons & Dragons adventure of all time by Dungeon magazine in 2004, on the 30th anniversary of the Dungeons & Dragons game. Dungeon's editors felt that the "pedestrian character of the caverns echoes the adventure's primordial nature", while its complicated wilderness setting and large second booklet set it apart from other adventures of the time. The booklet introduced 30 new creatures, including the derro and the demon lords Baphomet and Graz'zt. The reviewers felt that the adventure's defining moment was when the players find Iggwilv's "fabled treasure": her vampire daughter Drelzna.

At Gen Con 2026, Wizards of the Coast announced that Iggwilv's vampire daughter Drelnza will be the central focus of the upcoming adventure module Greyhawk: Crown of the Witch Queen (2027).

== E ==
=== Eclavdra ===
Eclavdra is a powerful drow priestess of Lolth, who is known for her cruelty and complex scheming, and her total lack of compassion. She eliminates rivals before they can become threats. In Gary Gygax's Gord the Rogue novels, Eclavdra is depicted as incredibly beautiful, with jet black skin, violet eyes, perfect breasts, and silvery or snow-white hair.

Eclavdra is the leader of House Eilservs and the most powerful priestess of Lolth. Her former consorts include Derakhshan and the demon lord Graz'zt. She also has a son, Athux. With Stalmin Klim she helped create the Slave Lords. The Slave Lord Edralve is her former protégé. A native of the city of Erelhei-Cinlu and member of House Eilservs, Eclavdra has served other powerful entities in the past, notably the Elder Elemental Eye and Graz'zt. For at time, she could be found at Iuz's court, acting as an ambassador. After Eclavdra's alliance with the Elder Elemental Eye jeopardized Lolth's attempt to bring the world of Oerth into the Demonweb Pits, she fell out of favor with her goddess. Her consort Derakhshan, seeing which way the wind was blowing, gave away details on her stronghold's defenses to her enemies among the other drow houses, though Eclavdra escaped. She regained Lolth's favor by seducing and eventually betraying Graz'zt. Athux, a powerful half demon drow, was the child born of that union. Eclavdra now serves as Lolth's chief diplomat, as well as the supreme mortal ruler of her organization and religion. Lolth admires ambition above loyalty, and thus Eclavdra is one of the most favored denizens of the Abyss.

Eclavdra is a major villain in Gygax's Gord the Rogue novels. She also has a clone in the series, Leda, who becomes Gord's lover. In the novel Against the Giants, Eclavdra was killed. In the novels, it is revealed that Nemis the mage was once her servant, but is no longer.

Created by Gary Gygax, Eclavdra first appeared in Hall of the Fire Giant King (1978). Eclavdra was initially depicted as the high priestess of the Elder Elemental God. In Gygax's Gord the Rogue novels, she is shown to be in the service of the demon lord Graz'zt. In later Dungeons & Dragons sourcebooks, Eclavdra is shown as having "returned" to the worship of Lolth. In Iuz the Evil, she is the ambassador to Iuz for both Graz'zt and Lolth simultaneously. Fiendish Codex I: Hordes of the Abyss has her betraying Graz'zt in return for Lolth's accolades. Eclavdra is given a statistics block in Lolth's entry in the 4th edition Monster Manual 3, as an exarch of Lolth.

=== Edralve ===
Edralve is a drow priestess of Lolth, former protégé of Eclavdra, and former Slave Lord. A native of Erelhei-Cinlu, Edralve was an exile from that city for some time during the late 560s to early 570s. By 574 CY, however, she had joined with Stalman Klim and other persons of malicious intent to form the Slave Lords, settling in the hidden city of Suderham in the Pomarj. After the Slave Lords lost power in 580 CY, Edralve left the organization and returned to Erelhei-Cinlu.

=== Eli Tomorast ===
Eli Tomorast is a wizard and the primary antagonist in the Mordenkainen's Fantastic Adventure module. Described as a gaunt human with black hair and facial hair, his forearms and hands have been replaced by those of an unknown demon, giving him additional powers which make him a more powerful adversary in the module. In the original adventure, published in 1984, Tomorast had little background, and served only as the owner of the Tome of the Black Heart, an artifact which Eli discovered in the Lost City of Elders somewhere to the east.

In the original module's timeline, Eli is slain by Mordenkainen, who was the character run by Gary Gygax. Mordenkainen was also printed in the module as a pre-generated character for players to use if they wished. In 2004, Dungeon magazine published "Maure Castle" in issue #112. This was an update to the original module, and presented a continuation of Eli's story. In the update, Eli was resurrected by a gnoll cleric of Yeenoghu who sought the power of the Tome of the Black Heart and its guardian, Kerzit. In this update, Eli, is bent on revenge against Mordenkainen and his associates.

Little is known of Eli Tomorast's early years. What is known is that at some point, he visited the Lost City of the Elders, possibly as a member of a Seeker expedition, where he discovered the Tome of the Black Heart, a powerful artifact which gave Tomorast the ability to summon and control a powerful demon named Kerzit. Tomorast set up Kerzit as a false god in order to expand his power, and provided sacrifices to the demon. In the 550s CY, Tomorast led a band of renegade Seekers to the ruins of Maure Castle, which he successfully entered and began looting. However, Tomorast had an ulterior agenda as well, for he wished to establish a concealed place to summon Kerzit. In the 560s CY, Mordenkainen and his companions Bigby, Riggby, and Yrag delved into the dungeons to face off against Tomorast and his Seekers, seemingly killing Tomorast and several of his men and making off with many of the choicest treasures of the subcomplex. However, Tomorast was not dead for long—he was raised by a cleric of the gnoll demon lord Yeenoghu. Soon, with a revamped Seeker organization, Tomorast began delving deeper into the secrets of the castle, recently even finding some communication between the outlying complex he has occupied and the main dungeon complex under the castle proper. Tomorast eventually discovered a way into the true dungeons of Maure Castle, and set about gathering the power required to take his revenge.

=== Evard ===
Evard, also known as Evard the Black, is a neutral evil archmage responsible for developing such spells as Evard's Black Tentacles. Evard is known to operate from the Sheldomar Valley, where he deals as an information broker. He is an enemy of Mordenkainen. Evard is a man of sturdy build and average musculature, with pale skin and long dark hair. He wears rich clothing, often belted with a white sash, and a large purple gemstone hangs from his throat. He is a charming man with a ready grin. Evard was originally a minor noble in the March of Bissel. He came to be a very successful broker of information, and many sages and loremasters send him knowledge in return for solving vexing questions of their own. If he doesn't know something, someone in his network does. He is ambitious and cunning, and will readily betray his allies if it suits him. He can be found in any of the major cities of the Sheldomar. In addition to the commonly known spell, Evard's Black Tentacles, Evard has also developed the following spells: Evard's All-Seeing Worm and Evard's Menacing Tentacles. Evard is known to have authored the following works: Legendary of Phantoms and Ghosts.

== K ==
=== Kargoth ===
Kargoth, more commonly known as Saint Kargoth, is a death knight of great power. He is also known as "the Betrayer", and "King of the Death Knights". His symbol is a glowing green skull. Saint Kargoth is of massive size and build, standing seven feet tall. His skeletal features are a baleful, glowing green color thanks to the fiendish surgeries and grafts his patron Demogorgon has subjected him to. He rides a glowing green chariot drawn by six nightmares. Saint Kargoth possesses the Bilious Sphere, a corrupt parody of the Orb of Sol. Saint Kargoth is a powerful servant of Demogorgon steeped in the politics of the Abyss. He is the mortal foe of Saint Benedor of the Ashen Hand, who was chosen over Kargoth to lead the Knight Protectors of the Great Kingdom. Kargoth is worshipped (along with the other original death knights) by the Sunsebb Sodality and regarded as a saint by renegade elements in the church of Hextor. Saint Kargoth is currently contending with Murlynd over an artifact known as the Quannon. Saint Kargoth dwells in Kolurenth, a stone fortress atop a rocky pinnacle protruding from the sea in the Demogorgon's realm of Gaping Maw. While the death knight is often away on business involving the Prime Material Plane, his fortress always hosts important human visitors. A sickly brown pool in Kargoth's private quarters is a two-way portal to Demogorgon's palace of Abysm.

Formerly a 2nd to 3rd-century CY Torquann nobleman and paladin of Heironeous known as Lord Kargoth of Mansbridge, Kargoth was born 141 CY in the Great Kingdom of Aerdy. After Benedor was chosen over Kargoth to lead the Knight Protectors, Kargoth's jealousy and bitterness allowed him to be seduced by the demon prince Demogorgon, who granted him the power he craved by transforming him into the first death knight in 203 CY. Kargoth, in turn, gathered thirteen fellow Knight Protectors to his cause, who were also transformed into death knights by Demogorgon.

Kargoth formerly lived at Castle Fharlanst, located on the Aerdi coast between Winetha and Roland, until it was destroyed by the Knight Protectors of the Great Kingdom in 247 CY. Kargoth's betrayal is regarded by many as the beginning of the end of the Knight Protectors. Kargoth's famous sword, Gorgorin the Shatterer, was lost when he battled the legendary Hainard of the Whiteguard.

=== Kas the Bloody-Handed ===
Kas the Bloody-Handed was the most trusted lieutenant of the despotic lich Vecna, and wielder of the Sword of Kas.

After many years of loyal service to Vecna, Kas eventually betrayed his master. It is said that the sword itself whispered to Kas, convincing him to slay his master and usurp his power. The battle destroyed Vecna's Rotting Tower, and cost the lich his left hand and eye. Kas himself was flung across the multiverse to Vecna's Citadel Cavitius on the Quasielemental Plane of Ash. The time he spent so close to the Negative Energy Plane changed him into a vampire, and he decided he would be called "Kas the Destroyer".

The first edition of Dungeon Master's Guide does not specifically state that Kas severed Vecna's hand and eye, only that they, and the Sword of Kas, were the only objects that survived the battle. Vecna: Hand of the Revenant depicts the lich losing his left hand and eye to destructive magic casts by priests of Pholtus (presumably to be restored at a future point in the story). Numerous third edition sources state with certainty that Vecna's hand and eye were severed by Kas's blade. Sources are also not in complete agreement as to when or how Kas became a vampire, as some state he gained his dark gift before his betrayal, while others state that he gained it after.

When Vecna was defeated during his bid for control of Oerth, Kas was freed from his centuries of imprisonment, only to find himself facing a shapeless wall of mist. When it cleared, he was master of the domain of Tovag, across the Burning Peaks from Vecna's domain of Cavitius. Kas waged an endless war of attrition with Vecna's forces in the hopes of retrieving the Sword of Kas from Vecna's citadel, where he erroneously believed Vecna held it.

The Burning Peaks cluster did not appear in the 3rd Edition Ravenloft Campaign Setting, because White Wolf Game Studio did not license characters that are explicitly tied to other D&D campaign settings.

When Vecna escaped from Cavitius, both realms were destroyed (explaining, in-fiction, their absence from 3rd edition). Kas was caught up in the destruction and very nearly obliterated; he survives only as a vestige, a soul outside time and space whose powers can be used by binders.

Kas is known to have authored Legendry of Great Arms and Fabulous Heroes.

In the adventure Die, Vecna, Die!, a death knight calling himself "Kas the Bloody-Handed" serves Vecna in the deity's palace in Ravenloft. This death knight is not the true Kas, though he believes himself to be, and his real name is not given. This false Kas seeks to redeem himself for "his" betrayal of Vecna centuries ago.

=== Keraptis ===
Keraptis is an evil wizard, and the main antagonist of the module White Plume Mountain. Little is known of the early life of Keraptis. Perhaps as early as c. -1500 CY, he established himself as protector of the Flan enclave of Tostenhca in the Griff Mountains. By c. -1100 CY, the wizard was driven out of the settlement. Circa -800 CY, Keraptis took over White Plume Mountain, near Rift Canyon, with an army of gnomish warriors, personally slaying the previous guardian of the mountain, the druid Aegwareth. Keraptis dwelt in White Plume Mountain for nine centuries afterward, finally abandoning his lair sometime in the 100s CY to further his research.

By the late 5th century CY, a band of adventurers known as the Brotherhood of the Tome stole the magical weapons Blackrazor, Frostrazor, Wave, and Whelm from White Plume Mountain. Realizing they needed protection from further such raids, the gnomes of the mountain opened up Keraptis' old laboratory, deploying magic that rewrote the personalities of those who read it with partial copies of Keraptis' own. The result was the first False Keraptis, a gnome who truly believed itself to be the original. Though this False Keraptis eventually died, further ones came into being: Nightfear, Spatterdock, Killjoy, Mossmutter, and Zhawar Orlysse all believe themselves to be the one true Keraptis.

Keraptis authored Pyronomicon.

== L ==
=== Lashonna ===
Lashonna is a silver dragon vampire and the highest ranking cleric to the god Kyuss. Centuries ago, she was slain by Dragotha, the dracolich and most powerful servant of Kyuss. However, upon her death, the dark god resurrected her as a vampire.

Over the centuries, Lashanna became the most devoted servant to Kyuss to the point of declaring herself his wife when the Age of Worms arrives. She is jealous of her god's favoritism of Dragotha, yet too weak to act against the dracolich. Along with an avolakia Mahuudril, she founded the Ebon Triad, a cult that believes Erythnul, god of slaughter, Hextor, god of tyranny, and Vecna, god of secrets, are three parts of the one evil god. In reality, however, known only to herself and Mahuudril, the cult's activities empower Kyuss and help usher his propheized Age of Worms. She holds great influence over the kingdom Redhand in the Bandit Kingdom and its ruler Prince Zeech, where she makes her home, appearing as a beautiful elven woman.

Lashonna is a major antagonist in the Age of Worms campaign.

=== Leomund ===
Leomund, also known as Leomund the Red, is a clever and practical archmage and former member of the Circle of Eight. Greyhawk Ruins names him as a rumored member of the Ring of Five. He always kept his whereabouts circumspect, but it is thought he once lived in Medegia.

Leomund, an immigrant from the East, was already ancient when he joined the Circle of Eight in approximately 571 CY. He retired from the Circle in 574 CY, citing other compelling uses of his time. He was replaced by Tenser later that year and has been seldom heard from since, and not at all in recent years.

Leomund developed the spells Leomund's Hidden Lodge, Leomund's Lamentable Belaborment, Leomund's Secret Chest, Leomund's Secure Shelter, Leomund's Tiny Hut, and Leomund's Trap. He authored or co-authored Architecture (with Mordenkainen), Forgotten Arts of Oratory Magnetism, Thesis on the Planes of Anti-Matter, and Transcendental Impenetrabilities.

Leomund is the creator of "Leomund's plate and cup". Made of engraved silver, gold, or platinum, these finely crafted dishes produce delicious meals and alcoholic drinks on command, at variable frequencies per day depending on the nature of the item. After use, they must be cleaned with sweet or holy water once a week or permanently stop functioning.

Leomund was the player character of Len Lakofka, who has stated vehemently that his character was never a member of the Circle of Eight. Instead, in the Oerth Journal #10, he suggested that the Circle member was an impostor whose true name was "Guy Gas". The class levels, birth date, and alignment attributed to him above come from Lakofka's Oerth Journal article, and must be considered apocryphal.

=== Loran ===
Sir Loran is a former human knight of Sunndi who became a death knight. Loran is eternally haunted by the spirit of his murdered wife.

Before his death, Loran was the final Lord of Trollpyre Keep, a minor estate located in southern Sunndi, near the Vast Swamp. An evil, twisted man who hid his true nature behind a mask of honor and stoicism, Loran sought to be known for founding a great warrior-household. To this end, Loran married Lyra, a beautiful dancer, but they had a daughter instead of a son. Enraged, Loran slew his wife, daughter, and the midwife, using his magic blade, Trollpyre's Defender. Loran's mother-in-law, a priestess, put a curse upon Loran—he was to die painfully in battle, then rise as one of the undead, and be haunted by the spirits of his wife and daughter for all eternity. Upon rising as a death knight, Loran was unable to sire children, and thus his line died with him.

Some time after his transformation, Loran lured a troupe of wandering performers to his keep and tortured them to death. This act succeeded in drawing him into the mists of Ravenloft. Eventually making his way to Cavitius, Sir Loran entered Vecna's service. However, Lyra and her child were also there, and continued to haunt him.

=== Lorana Kath ===
Lady Lorana Kath is a death knight, one of the 13 who betrayed the Knight Protectors of the Great Kingdom. In the game, Kath was once a cleric of Hextor of great power, and she is considered the catalyst for the betrayal of the Death Knights through her seduction of Lord Kargoth. Lady Lorana Kath augments her skeletal visage with gruesome masks made from the severed faces of young maidens. She often accessorizes her plate armor with a bloody apron and bridal veil.

Within the Greyhawk world, Kath was known as a powerful priestess of Hextor in life and was admitted into the Knight Protectors in an unorthodox manner, as a recognition for her medical skills on the battlefield. However, Kath was possessed of a scheming and ambitious mind, and desired to marry herself to a leading Aerdi noble to aid in her pursuit of power in the Great Kingdom. She was betrothed to Prince Moranvich in 196, but the engagement soon fell apart. After the death of Knight Commander Lord Nidramon the Hextorian in 202 CY, Kath began to court the favor of Lord Kargoth, a powerful Heironean who most felt would be chosen as Nidramon's replacement. However, when the Council Gallant instead chose Sir Benedor Monlath of Chathold, Kath was there to fan the fires of Kargoth's rage. After Kargoth failed to overcome Benedor in a duel at the later's investiture in 203 CY, he was seduced by the demon lord Demogorgon, who transformed the mighty paladin into Oerth's first death knight. Kargoth soon assembled thirteen of his fellow Knight Protectors, including Kath, to plot revenge. Kargoth led his allies on a raid of the Temple of Lothan near Rel Deven, in order to seize an ancient Oeridian artifact known as the Orb of Sol. Using foul magic granted to him by Demogorgon, Kargoth used the Orb to deliver his allies to his master, transforming them into death knights as well, and also to unleash a great demonic horror known as Arendagrost, Maw of the Abyss, upon the land. Kath, unlike Kargoth, has no interest in advancing the plans of Demogorgon, and still considers herself a priestess of Hextor. She maintains an estate to the northwest of the Stringen region of the North Kingdom, where she amuses herself with research into the Ur-Flan and their necromantic practices. It is said that Kath's research into these ancient sorcerers led her to develop the means to create animi, the unique undead servitors of Ivid V in the last years of his reign. Kath supposedly created the process as a means of reversing the transformation invoked upon herself.

=== Lum the Mad ===
Baron Lum the Mad is a mighty Oeridian warlord whose power was at least partially due to his possession of the artifact known as the Infernal Machine. Lum was betrayed by his former general, Leuk-o, when the latter came to possess the artifact later known as the Mighty Servant of Leuk-o. Their final conflict left a large area wasted. A mysterious mist appeared, and Lum plunged through a dimensional rift to the plane of Limbo, where Lum waited for centuries, his connection to the machine leaving him unable to die. The machine was housed in the fortress Rifter, near Rauxes, until the city was destroyed in 586 CY, quite likely due to the machine's wild influence.

Baron Lum lived a life obsessed with war and conquest, trained for it from boyhood, when he was rewarded for thinking and planning but punished for frivolous behavior. His first experience with the love of the opposite sex was twisted, painful, and empty. He grew to be a handsome man with rugged features marred with only a few scars. More than eight centuries ago he discovered the sword Druniazth, an artifact sacred to Tharizdun. He wielded it against Ur-Flannae sorcerers of the Thelwood, but lost it during the fray. He spent the rest of his time on Oerth searching for it, the effort slowly driving him insane.

Years later, while exploring a castle his armies had conquered, he came across the Machine that would bear his name, a horseshoe-shaped nightmare of black metal, festooned with levers, dials, sockets, wires, and plugs. Through trial and error, he learned to manipulate it, learning more about its functioning than even the wisest sages have since then. If he was mad before, the blasphemous technology of the device drove him over the edge, but it also brought him great power. With his disciplined troops and his new powers, he carved out a mighty fiefdom. It is said that, with the machine, he brought no fewer than 50 new species of monsters into the world. He thought nothing of barrages of fire that annihilated large numbers of his own troops, so long as he carried the day. His reign was one of cruelty and horror, but it is credited in part for the impressive Oeridian successes in the days before their victories over the rival Suel and Flan were assured.

Lum's reign approached its twilight when his formerly loyal subordinate, General Leuk-O, discovered the Mighty Servant artifact in the Belching Vortex that would become known by his name. Some believe the Mighty Servant and the Infernal Machine were created by the same otherworldly artificer, and the appearance of them both so close together was no coincidence. It is said the quasi-deity Krovis awoke from his sleep during this period to help bring Lum's tyranny to an end. With the power of the Mighty Servant, Leuk-O gathered a host that matched Lum's own. The two armies clashed many times before their final battle, when Lum disappeared. The fate of Leuk-O is unknown.

Lum and his Infernal Machine have been featured in the computer games Baldur's Gate II: Throne of Bhaal, as being imprisoned in Watcher's Keep, and briefly at the end of Planescape: Torment when the final boss refers to a time when the Nameless One "danced sorceries with Lum the Mad".

== M ==
=== Kevelli Mauk ===
A mysterious figure from the setting's history, Kevelli Mauk founded the Scarlet Brotherhood and tasked this authoritarian organization with safeguarding the heritage and culture of the Suel ethnicity after a magical cataclysm ca. a thousand years before Greyhawk's main storyline.

=== Melf ===
Melf, also known as Prince Brightflame, is a grey elven archmage, and was originally a player character of Lucion Paul Gygax in Gary Gygax's home campaign. Melf is a native of the elven kingdom of Celene, and is recognized by many as the leader of the Knights of Luna.

In Gary Gygax's 1986 novel Artifact of Evil, Melf is also known as Melf of the Arrow. He seems to acknowledge that Melf is not his real name, but says "it is a simple name, as good as any."

Melf was one of the original player characters that explored Gary Gygax's dungeons of Castle Greyhawk. He was created by Gygax's son, Lucion Paul (Luke) Gygax.

Melf is 5'8", 147 lbs, and about 200 years old (appearing in his late 20s in human terms). He changes his appearance from time to time, though he always appears as an elf. 1983's The Shady Dragon Inn describes his counterpart Peralay as "left-handed, blond, hazel-eyed, and large for an elf (5'8", 148 lbs.)." It says furthermore that Peralay's shield is decorated with "the hunting hawk symbol of his clan" and that his sword, Gnoll-Cleaver, was forged long ago by dwarves.

Melf is vastly knowledgeable and experienced. He specializes in Iuz and buried evils, and is strongly opposed to both Iuz and the Scarlet Brotherhood.

An ally of Mordenkainen and a former member of the Citadel of Eight, in Artifact of Evil Melf is said to have sworn fealty to Mordenkainen, and he carries the holy symbol of Fharlanghn. Melf is also a cousin of Queen Yolande of Celene. He has also been depicted as fighting side by side with Prince Olinstaad Corond of Ulek, presumably during a 586 counteroffensive to regain Principality lands lost to the Empire of the Pomarj during the Greyhawk Wars.

Although secretive and protective, Melf is on good terms with luminaries such as Kieran Jalucian, King Belvor IV of Furyondy, and the rulers of Dyvers, Highfolk, and the City of Greyhawk. He and Mordenkainen have much respect for each other, but the two do not cooperate, at least not anymore. The mayor of Highfolk town, Tavin Ersteader, is a former apprentice of Melf.

Melf is on good terms with the Fellowship of the Torch, and is often seen in the company of Kirilarien Allavesse when in Greyhawk.

Melf was also listed in Greyhawk Ruins as one of the rumored members of the Ring of Five.

A Prince Archosian Brightflame of Celene is mentioned in Fiendish Codex I: Hordes of the Abyss. This other Prince Brightflame is more than 150 years older than Melf and currently a heroic general battling demons in the Abyss.

There is some apocryphal evidence that Melf and Warduke may know each other. In 1983's The Shady Dragon Inn (a Mystara-based supplement for Basic D&D), Warduke is mentioned as being a member of the same adventuring party as an elf named "Peralay," both of whom had action figures for TSR's 1983 toy line. The fact that the Peralay figure was originally released under the name "Melf" and Warduke's resurgence in Greyhawk continuity provide a topic of apocryphal interest.

According to From the Ashes, Melf represents the Knights of Luna in Greyhawk. The Greyhawk Player's Guide says he is currently living in exile from Celene, sometimes in the City of Greyhawk.

Melf is responsible for developing such spells as Melf's Acid Arrow, Melf's Unicorn Arrow, and Melf's Minute Meteors.

Melf is known to have authored or co-authored the following works:

- Treatise of Universal Astronomy
- Weapons of the Ether (with Mordenkainen)

In 1983, a Melf action figure was released as part of LJN's Advanced Dungeons & Dragons toy line. However, the figure was eventually renamed as "Peralay."

== N ==
=== Nerof Gasgal ===
Nerof Gasgal is the Lord Mayor of the Free City of Greyhawk, also known as Greyhawk City. He has held this position since 570 CY. He is also the Assistant Guildmaster of Greyhawk's Guild of Thieves.

Nerof Gasgal was born 540 CY in Greyhawk. At some point, he joined the Guild of Thieves, which was then under the leadership of Guildmaster Arentol.

In 570 CY, Gasgal became Lord Mayor of Greyhawk (it is assumed that he was a member of the Directing Oligarchy prior to that). One of the youngest mayors in Greyhawk's history, Gasgal and his allies on the Directing Oligarchy (who include Org Nenshen, his best friend, former partner, and guildmaster of the Thieves Guild) brought great changes and dynamism to the city government, including reforming the city's currency.

Gasgal has led Greyhawk for almost three decades, bringing the city to victory over its enemies, expanding its territory, and increasing its wealth. In fact, Gasgal is regarded as one of Greyhawk's greatest mayors, second only to Zagig Yragerne.

=== Nolzur ===
Nolzur is an illusionist and alchemist (and former thief) once part of the famed Company of Seven. After many adventures, he rose to the status of quasi-deity. As a member of the Company of Seven, he adventured with Zagig Yragerne, Heward, Keoghtom, Murlynd, Quaal, and Tasha. He still has not forgiven Keoghtom.

Nolzur began his career in Radigast City in the County of Urnst as a thief. His early travels took him to many places, including Blackmoor and the Pirate Isles. He joined Zagig Yragerne's Company of Seven, accompanying them on wild adventures in the early 300s CY.

He journeyed with Murlynd and Keoghtom to the Cold Marshes in search of ruins of a civilization of sorcerous amphibians. There the three adventurers battled a lich-queen known as the Weird of the Cold Heath. Nolzur argued that they should keep her disease-causing staff for use as a weapon against Iuz, but Keoghtom decided to reverse its effects instead, creating an item known as Keoghtom's Staff of Purification.

Nolzur and Keoghtom's differences became irreconcilable more than a century ago when, according to repute, Keoghtom borrowed one of Nolzur's formulas in order to aid the creation of his famed Keoghtom's Ointment. This caused a permanent wedge in the Company of Seven, and the group went their separate ways. Nolzur went into seclusion, Zagig retired to his castle, and Murlynd and Keoghtom left the Oerth behind to explore other planes of existence.

Nolzur's reclusiveness has caused his fame to fade in recent decades.

Nolzur created Nolzur's marvelous pigments and Nolzur's orb.

=== Nystul ===
Nystul is an archmage and member of the Circle of Eight. He is also the most famous native of the Duchy of Tenh. At one time, Nystul had an apprentice named Janina.

Nystul developed the spells Nystul's Magic Aura, Nystul's Undetectable Aura, Nystul's Blacklight Burst, Nystul's Blackmote, Nystul's Blazing Beam, Nystul's Crystal Dagger, Nystul's Crystal Dirk, Nystul's Dancing Dweomer, Nystul's Dancing Werelight, Nystul's Enveloping Darkness, Nystul's Expeditious Fire Extinguisher, Nystul's Flash, Nystul's Golden Revelation, Nystul's Grue Conjuration, Nystul's Lightburst, Nystul's Radiant Arch, and Nystul's Radiant Baton. He authored Libram of the Great Paravisual Emanations and Metaphysics of Mathematics.

Nystul is one of the famous mages whose spells were included in the 1988 Greyhawk Adventures hardbound.

Backstab magazine contributor Kaneda considered Nystul one of the greatest magicians from the Greyhawk campaign setting.

== O ==
=== Obmi ===
Obmi, sometimes called Lord Obmi, is a murderous mountain dwarven fighter and member of Iuz's Boneshadow. He has iron grey hair, has a taciturn personality, and delights in playing power games. Originally from the Crystalmists, he is known as "the Hammer of Iuz" due to his use of the dwarven throwing hammer, and "Obmi the Wily" for his cunning. He appears in the Gord the Rogue novels as an enemy of Gord, Leda, and Eclavdra.

Obmi is sometimes accompanied by a deranged grey elf fighter/mage named Keak and a gnomish illusionist/rogue named Gleed. In the past, Obmi was a slave of, then advisor to, the fire giant king Snurre Ironbelly.

Obmi's early history is unknown. He is known to have been a slave of the fire giant king, Snurre Ironbelly of the Hellfurnaces from 546 to 551 CY. By 551 CY, Obmi had proven his worth as an advisor, and served King Snurre for the next twenty-five years in that role. In 576 CY, Snurre's hall was raided by adventurers. Obmi escaped by masquerading as a dwarven prince. Shortly after his escape, Obmi joined the service of Iuz.

==== Creative origins ====
Obmi first appeared in Gary Gygax's original Castle Greyhawk campaign between 1972 and 1973, where he was placed in an old magical laboratory in the center of the third level of the dungeon. Gygax gave him boots of speed, a dwarven thrower, and several gnoll henchmen. He also had a magical device that shot a ray that teleported the PCs to another part of the dungeon if they failed their saves. After many unsuccessful attempts, the PCs (the Citadel of Eight) finally destroyed the device, but Obmi escaped. Their hatred of Obmi did not diminish.

=== Otiluke ===
Otiluke was an archmage. He was slain by Rary in Harvester 584 CY, at the close of the Greyhawk Wars.

Backstab magazine contributor Kaneda considered Otiluke one of the greatest magicians from the Greyhawk campaign setting.

==== Publication history ====
Otiluke is one of the famous mages of the Greyhawk setting whose spells were included in the 1988 Greyhawk Adventures hardbound.

=== Otto ===
Otto is a powerful human wizard, and member of the Circle of Eight. Otto is short and rotund, with shoulder-length curly hair, and a well-groomed mustache. He tends to dress in fine, expensive garb. Originally a priest of Boccob in Almor, Otto soon found he had an uncanny knack for wizardry, and became quite skilled in the arcane arts. At the secret prompting of Mordenkainen, he became a henchman of Robilar for a time. Otto is a lover of fine food and music. He owns a manor in Greyhawk City's Garden Quarter, where he is a generous patron of the arts.

In Gary Gygax's original Greyhawk home game, Otto was a denizen of the second level beneath Castle Greyhawk. Robilar, Tenser, and Terik encountered him while adventuring there. Otto was subdued by Tenser, but decided to work for Robilar. He subsequently gained levels rapidly, rarely straying from Robilar's side. In the original campaign, Otto was chaotic neutral and reached 18th level as a single-class magic user of chaotic neutral alignment.

Otto is known to have authored or co-authored the following works: Aestrella (a magical aria of his composition) and Arcane Manipulations of the Entourage. Otto is responsible for developing the commonly known spell Otto's irresistible dance. Many of the spells he has created are specialized by sound, sonic, or musical motifs. Otto has also developed the following additional spells: Otto's chime of release, Otto's crystal rhythms, Otto's drums of despair, Otto's gong of isolation, Otto's imperative ambulation, Otto's silver tongue, Otto's soothing vibrations, Otto's sure-footed shuffle, Otto's tin soldiers, Otto's tonal attack, Otto's tones of forgetfulness, and Otto's warding tones.

Backstab magazine contributor Kaneda listed Otto among the greatest wizards from the Greyhawk campaign setting.

== R ==
=== Rary ===
In the World of Greyhawk campaign setting for the Dungeons & Dragons roleplaying game, Rary of Ket is a powerful archmage and ruler of the Bright Lands, also known as Rary the Traitor.

In a storyline developed by TSR for a resetting of the Greyhawk campaign in 1991, Rary, a member of the Circle of Eight, betrayed the Circle at the end of the Greyhawk Wars and was responsible for the deaths of Circle members Otiluke and Tenser. After his betrayal, Rary fled with his ally Lord Robilar to the Bright Desert, where he established the Empire of the Bright Lands.

Backstab magazine contributor Kaneda considered Rary one of the greatest magicians from the Greyhawk campaign setting.

=== Riggby ===
Riggby, also known as Riggby the Patriarch, was a major cleric of Boccob and a companion of the archmage Mordenkainen. In his prime, Riggby had black hair and chestnut-colored eyes. He customarily wore robes of light gray and off-white. He was a fiery evangelist for his uncaring deity, often demanding that unbelievers convert or die. He pursued temporal power in order to better maintain the spirituality of those among him. Besides Boccob, he also revered Zagyg. Riggby began his career as a priest at a small chapel. At some point, he met with Mordenkainen and other members of an adventuring band the wizard was forming, and soon became a founding member of the Citadel of Eight.

Riggby was one of the adventurers, along with Mordenkainen, Bigby and Yrag, who delved into Maure Castle to face off against Eli Tomorast and the demon Kerzit. Riggby, along with Mordenkainen's Citadel of Eight also delved into the dungeons underneath the Temple of Elemental Evil.

In 570 CY, Riggby accompanied Lord Robilar into the dungeons underneath Castle Greyhawk in an ill-fated attempt to free, and then permanently kill, the demigod Iuz, who had been imprisoned there since 505 CY by Zagig Yragerne. Sometime after the failure and release of the demigod, he settled down in Greyhawk City as the head of city's great temple of Boccob, and spent much of the balance of his life in retirement.

In 597 CY, Riggby died of natural causes in Verbobonc, as depicted in the module Expedition to the Ruins of Greyhawk. His body was taken to Greyhawk for burial. It would be Riggby's death that set in motion the latest of Iuz's gambits to destroy the city, revenge himself on Mordenkainen and Robilar and strike out for domination of the Flanaess.

As with many of the original Greyhawk characters, Riggby grew out of a character played by Gary Gygax during the first campaigns run by him and Robert J. Kuntz. Riggby originated as one of a series of "henchmen" characters who followed Mordenkainen, and was named by Kuntz employing a serial naming convention (all the names ended in "-igby") that also yielded the name Bigby. He first appeared in print in the 1980 supplement The Rogues' Gallery, and was revised four years later by Kuntz for use as a player character for Mordenkainen's Fantastic Adventure.

=== Robilar ===
==== Castle Greyhawk sessions ====
Robilar was originally the creation of Rob Kuntz, rolled up on Gary Gygax's kitchen table in late 1972 for the second-ever session of the game that would become known as Dungeons & Dragons. Gygax even suggested the name "Robilar", after a minor character in The Gnome Cache, a novella Gygax was writing that eventually would be serialized in the first few issues of The Dragon starting in June 1976. Kuntz quickly grew impatient with play when it involved more than a couple of players, often playing solo adventures one-on-one with Gygax; their constant (almost daily) play meant that Robilar rapidly gained power and possessions. As the city of Greyhawk was developed and fleshed out, Robilar also became the secret owner of the Green Dragon Inn in the city of Greyhawk, where he kept tabs on happenings in the city. Robilar was not only the first to reach the 13th and bottom level of Gygax's Greyhawk dungeons, but on the way, he was also responsible for freeing nine demi-gods (whom Gygax revived a decade later as some of the first deities of Greyhawk: Iuz, Ralishaz, Trithereon, Erythnul, Olidammara, Heironeous, Celestian, Hextor, and Obad-Hai). Witwer et al. commented that this "lawful evil character here became legendary in D&D circles for conquering seemingly impossible dungeons, often through the ruthless use of henchmen as cannon fodder."

==== Temple of Elemental Evil sessions ====
Robilar was also the first to enter Gygax's Temple of Elemental Evil, and trashed it from top to bottom, even freeing the demoness Zuggtmoy from her prison at the centre of the Temple. Kuntz later related that Gygax was very dismayed that his masterpiece dungeon had been destroyed by a single adventurer, and as punishment, Gygax had an army pursue Robilar all the way back to his castle, which Robilar was forced to abandon. Robilar even lost possession of the Green Dragon Inn. Robilar's various adventures were mentioned by Gygax in his column in Dragon magazine.

==== Later publications ====
Robilar was also profiled in The Rogues Gallery, a 1980 TSR publication, along with other notable characters mentioned in Gygax's works such as Tenser and Erac's Cousin. He was described as a world-weary warrior and survivor of many adventures who had changed his worldview from neutral to evil to satisfy his morbid tastes. His three passions in life were adventuring, magic items, and information.

When Gygax was forced out of TSR at the end of 1985, TSR took over the creative rights to all characters mentioned in any of Gygax's articles, adventures, and stories, including Robilar. Several years later, TSR created a new storyline for Gygax's World of Greyhawk that featured the murder of several members of the Circle of Eight by Robilar and the archmage Rary. Kuntz, as the creator of Robilar, was unhappy with this, stating that Robilar would never turn on his old adventuring companion, Mordenkainen (Gygax's own D&D character). Although Kuntz had long since left TSR and had no creative control over Robilar's published life, he suggested in print that the person responsible for aiding Rary was in fact a clone or evil twin of Robilar's who had "taken over" Robilar's apparent life while Robilar was off adventuring on a distant plane. This suggestion became a "fact" in 2007 with the publication of Expedition to the Ruins of Greyhawk, where it is revealed that Robilar had been imprisoned by an evil "twin" from another universe named Bilarro, who had then impersonated the hero while he aided Rary in his evil actions.

== S ==
=== Serten ===
Serten is a powerful priest of Saint Cuthbert and member of the Citadel of Eight. He is rumored to be a member of the Ring of Five. Though he had low intelligence and was never truly respected by the rest of the Citadel of Eight, Serten was well-meaning, kindly, and likable and seen as useful. He liked to adventure, but wasn't seen as competent enough to go on his own, as he was often too dumb to run away when in danger and he seldom planned ahead. Serten was slain 569 CY at the Battle of Emridy Meadows, having finally been permitted to adventure without the rest of his party. Tenser blamed Mordenkainen for his death and left the Citadel of Eight over the issue.

Serten is associated with Serten's Spell Immunity, though as a 10th level cleric he is unlikely to have developed what was an 8th level magic-user spell himself. Serten's Ring grants a continuous Serten's Spell Immunity effect while worn. It is currently in the possession of Lakaster of Winetha.

Serten is said in Dragon #82 to have authored Arcane Resistance of Dwarves and Halflings, an arcane spellbook.

Serten was originally a cleric played by Ernie Gygax, one of Gary Gygax's sons. Like Tenser, another of Ernie's characters, Serten is an anagram of his name, Ernest. Ernie also played Erac's Cousin and Erac.

Although Serten was clearly labeled a cleric in The Rogues Gallery and the Living Greyhawk Journal #0, the existence of the Spell Immunity spell, his purported authorship of a wizardly spellbook, and a rumor in Greyhawk Ruins all point to the existence of a wizard called Serten. Ivid the Undying refers to Serten as a "legendary archmage".

=== Snurre Ironbelly ===
Snurre Ironbelly, also called King Snurre, is a notorious lord of fire giants. His wife is Queen Frupy.

== T ==
=== Tasha ===
When the AD&D Players Handbook was first published, many of the wizards that were mentioned in the spell lists, such as Tenser and Bigby, were actual characters who had been created and played by Gary Gygax and his friends and children. However, the Tasha of Tasha's hideous laughter was actually named after a little girl who wrote letters to Gygax with crayons.

In later material, Gygax revealed that Tasha was an alias used by Iggwilv during her time as an apprentice of Zagig Yragerne and a member of the Company of Seven.

=== Theodain Eriason ===
Theodain Eriason is a powerful elven wizard, and the first non-human member of the Circle of Eight. A native of the Yeomanry, Theodain operates throughout the Sheldomar Valley, but makes his home in a small country estate outside Loftwick. Theodain is tall and gaunt for an elf. His hair is black, with a silver streak and his skin is very pale. He is sarcastic, arrogant, intelligent, and strongly in favor of the Circle of Eight intervening more strongly in world affairs. His cold demeanor has caused some to mistake him for a creature of evil.

Theodain was born in the western Dreadwood. His family moved to the Yeomanry, near Loftwick, after the Yeomanry League declared its independence from Keoland. Theodain began his career as a warrior, and didn't take up the study of magic until 470 CY, when his father, who had been a Grossspokesman, died. He studied magic with elven wizards in the Dreadwood and at the magic school in Gradsul. Theodain has adventured widely, from the Underdark beneath the Hellfurnaces to battling elemental cults in the Hool Marshes. In 585 CY, Theodain was invited to join the Circle of Eight by Drawmij, who hoped to gain him as an ally against Jaran Krimeeah. At least, this is what Return of the Eight tells us. Living Greyhawk Journal #0 says that Drawmij argued vehemently against Theodain's inclusion, and treats him with only bland acceptance today.

Theodain enjoys the company of Drawmij, Nystul, Otto, and Jallarzi Sallavarian, though Nystul argued against the acceptance of non-human members and the canon disagrees on Drawmij's relationship with him. Alhamazad and Warnes Starcoat treat Theodain with coolness. Theodain views them with suspicion and they see him as an irresponsible hothead. Theodain openly questions Mordenkainen's leadership at times, to the bare-pated wizard's annoyance. Theodain's greatest friend and ally is the dragon Hautna Masq, who has been known to assume his appearance and masquerade as him while in the Yeomanry.

== W ==
=== Warduke ===
Warduke is a powerful human fighter, who sometimes works as a bounty hunter and assassin, and is heartless, cruel and short-tempered. Originally created as part of "a stable of iconic characters" for licensed merchandise and to illustrate "basic concepts of fantasy role-playing like alignment and characters class", he has made appearances set in multiple campaign settings. The character's name was chosen by Gary Gygax.

=== Warnes Starcoat ===
Warnes Starcoat is a powerful human wizard, and a member of the Circle of Eight since 585 CY. He is a Counselor to the Courts of Urnst and Chief Sorcerous Councilor (an office also known as "Chief Magical Councilor") to Duke Karll of the Duchy of Urnst.

Warnes appears as a greatly refined gentleman of Suel ethnicity, though his complexion is tanned from spending much of his time outdoors. His beard is short and well-trimmed. He wears the Starcoat, a magical coat as black as the night that glimmers with distant stars, and is rarely seen without his wide-brimmed, plumed hat. His patron deity is Zagyg.

Warnes was born in 534 CY in Leukish, capital of the Duchy of Urnst, to a merchant family of moderate influence and wealth. The third son of four, he was sent to the city of Seltaren when he came of age, to study magic at the Wizardholme of Urnst. Warnes proved to be quite talented, becoming a well-regarded generalist mage before the age of thirty. He was soon made a junior assistant to the Seer of Urnst, but left the position due to philosophical differences. Warnes' victory over the Weird of Gnatmarsh made him the most respected wizard in the region. Warnes helped retrieve the Crook of Rao from the Isle of the Ape, thwarting the machinations of Iggwilv.

Warnes does not wish Agath of Thrunch to outshine him. He dislikes thieves. Alhamazad dislikes him. Jallarzi Sallavarian was at one time his student. Bigby only grudgingly agreed to admit him into the Circle. Theodain Eriason views him with suspicion, while Warnes in turn views Theodain as an unreliable firebrand whose methods are morally questionable at best.

== X ==
=== Xavener ===
Xavener, is ruler of the United Kingdom of Ahlissa. Xavener is also head of the Royal House of Darmen. His ancestral lands are centered on Kalstrand.

== Y ==
=== Yolande ===
Yolande is the grey elven queen of the elven kingdom of Celene. Her honorifics include "Her Fey Majesty," the "Faerie Queen," the "Perfect Flower of Celene," and "Lady Rhalta of All Elvenkind". Yolande has white skin, lilac-colored eyes, and is breathtakingly beautiful. She was described by Gord the Rogue in Gary Gygax's novel, Artifact of Evil, as being more beautiful than any woman he'd ever seen. Yolande is advised by her chief advisor and cousin, a noble elf named Onselven. Prince Brightflame, better known as Melf, is also a cousin. Yolande has taken several Royal Consorts during her reign, the first being Prince Triserron, whose death prompted the Hateful Wars. Her most recent consort is Prince Fasstal Dothmar, wielder of Concluder. Yolande makes her home in Celene's capital of Enstad, where she resides in the Palace of the Faerie Queen. She is protected by the Knights of the Companion Guard.

Originally from the Celene settlement of Bellmeadow, Princess Yolande was already an accomplished fighter and wizard when she ascended the throne in 361 CY. Yolande was chosen by the princes of the realm to unite the nation against expansionist Keoland. When the Keoish garrisons were expelled, Yolande organized Celene's defenses, whilst her consort, Prince Triserron, defeated the Keoish forces in several minor engagements.

Near the end of the 5th century CY, Triserron was ambushed and slain by orcs in a narrow pass in the Lortmils, just south of Courwood. The death of her beloved led Yolande to lead her nation and the Ulek States in the Hateful Wars of 498-510 CY, clearing the Lortmils of every orc, goblin, and other evil humanoids. For her role in the hateful Wars, the Grand Court of Celene awarded Yolande the Mantle of the Blue Moon, naming her "Lady Rhalta of All Elvenkind".

Such honors have done little to soothe Yolande's grief, however, and though she has since taken a number of consorts to with whom to engage in the Faerie Mysteries, many believe she has never recovered from the loss of Triserron. Speculation holds that the Prince Consort's death is they key reason that Yolande has led Celene down an ever-increasing path of isolationism, a policy which not all people of Celene (notably the Knights of Luna) agree with.

Celene's isolationism had grown so strong by the 580's CY that Yolande failed to offer assistance to the Principality of Ulek to turn back the orcish hordes of Turrosh Mak's Pomarj during the Greyhawk Wars of 582-584 CY. Though some speculate that Yolande may be controlled by evil forces or advisors, the truth is simply that the queen views elven lives as too valuable to waste in conflicts outside her realm.

Some time after the Greyhawk Wars, Yolande lost another Royal Consort, when her most recent one entered the mysterious Moonarch of Sehanine and never returned. Yolande's diviners have yet to determine his fate.
