= Barbara G. Young =

American game designer and editor

- Born: July 3 Chicago, Illinois
- Other names: Barbara Green Deer
- Occupations: Game designer, editor

Barbara G. Young is an editor who has worked on several game products and articles for the Dungeons & Dragons fantasy role-playing game from TSR. She was an assistant editor on Dragon and Dungeon magazines from 1987 to 1995.

== Early life and education ==
Barbara Young was born in Chicago on July 3. She attended Northeastern Illinois University. Young had a double major in English and linguistics, reflecting her interests in turning thought into language and the possibilities of communication with other life forms (either on Earth or elsewhere), as well as science-fiction and fantasy literature, and creative writing.

== Career ==
Young took several secretarial positions in sequence before working at IBM on one of the first word processors. Her interest in science fiction and fantasy led to her involvement in the role-playing game industry, specifically TSR, Inc.: "By way of fandom, I was introduced to the Dungeons & Dragons game, and I kibbitzed quite a few games before getting involved myself." Young answered an advertisement in the Chicago Tribune for a game editor at TSR. Young worked for TSR in that capacity from September 1984 to 1985, then worked on a local newspaper while editing game modules for TSR as a freelancer. In January 1987, Young began working in TSR's magazine department as the assistant editor for Dungeon Adventures. Dragon magazine won the 1989 Origins Award for "Best Professional Adventure Gaming Magazine of 1989" while she was the editor.
