= Greyhawk Adventures =

1988 sourcebook by Jim Ward

- Author: Jim Ward
- Cover artist: Jeff Easley
- Language: English
- Genre: Fantasy; Role-playing game
- Publisher: TSR
- Publication date: September 1988
- Publication place: United States
- Pages: 128
- ISBN: 0-88038-649-5
- OCLC: 18842029
- Dewey Decimal: 793.93 20
- LC Class: GV1469.62.D84 W38 1988

Greyhawk Adventures is an accessory for the Advanced Dungeons & Dragons (AD&D) World of Greyhawk campaign setting.

== Contents ==
Greyhawk Adventures contains information about Greyhawk deities, clerics, major non-player characters, monsters, geography, spells of the setting's notable magic-users, magic items of the setting, rules for playing zero-level characters, and six short role-playing adventures. The supplement is intended to be compatible with both the 1st and 2nd Edition Advanced Dungeons & Dragons rule systems. The contents of Greyhawk Adventures represent a transitional state between the 1st and 2nd edition AD&D rules; the NPCs in the Hall of Heroes include monks, a 1st Edition character class not included in the 2nd Edition rules, while the "Monsters of Greyhawk" chapter uses the 2nd Edition's system of rolling two ten-sided dice (2d10) for monster morale, rather than the 1st Edition's d100-based morale system.

Greyhawk Adventures elaborates on the religions, deities, and clerics of the setting, and introduces the concept of avatars: low-powered physical manifestations of the various deities, each of which receives a portion of a deity's power and is sent to the Prime Material Plane to carry out the deity's wishes. Greyhawk Adventures also continued the process of making clerics more individualized—begun in the second edition of the World of Greyhawk Fantasy Game Setting—by detailing such things as the use of special powers granted by their deities, the types of weapons they must use, and the types of spells a cleric may employ. Lisa Stevens thought that this section's appearance was "great", but noted as a drawback that it was missing key deities while including some lesser-known ones.

The monsters in the "Monsters of Greyhawk" section are classified similarly to the existing Monster Manual books, but with additional information provided on its habitat terrain type, organization, active times, diet, and other game statistics. The "Hall of heroes" section contains detailed descriptions of some of the key non-player characters active in the world of Oerth, including: the City of Greyhawk's Lord Mayor; Constable of the City; Captain-General of the Watch; the heads of the Thieves and Assassins Guilds; Jaran Krimeeah, the Mage of the Vale; and two members of the Scarlet Brotherhood of evil monks.

The book presents 106 new spells drawn from the spell books of notable wizards such as Bigby, Mordenkainen, Nystul, Tenser, and Rary. Each of the book's magical items comes with a background that ties it into the campaign setting. The descriptions of various geographical locations include a number of adventure outlines which show the kind of encounters that PCs entering different geographical areas are likely to experience, and include notes for dungeon masters (DMs) to show how the featured locations can be turned into adventure settings.

The book provides six adventure scenarios, as outlines for DMs to fill in. Two are for zero-level characters struggling to work up to 1st level, and the other adventures include a dive to a sunken ship to recover treasure, entry into the Valley of the Mage, a rescue mission set in a house, and an evening's entertainment in a gambling house. The zero-level character system for fledgling characters allows PCs to grow into their character-class roles and gives them special abilities not normally associated with a character class.

== Publication history ==
Greyhawk Adventures was written by James M. Ward, with cover art by Jeff Easley, and was published by TSR, Inc. in 1988 as a 128-page hardbound book. The book features additional design by Daniel Salas, Skip Williams, Nigel D. Findley, Thomas Kane, Stephen Inniss, Len Carpenter, and Eric Oppen. Editing and coordination was by Warren Spector, with editing by Anne Browne, Karen Boomgarden, Steve Winter, Mike Breault, Scott Haring, and Jon Pickens and special developmental work by Pickens. The book was the thirteenth hardback manual published for the 1st edition Advanced Dungeons & Dragons rules, though a note on its cover states the book is also compatible with the 2nd Edition. White Wolf magazine stated that it was "the only hardback AD&D book of 1988". The book features interior illustrations by Easley, Jeff Dee, Diesel, Larry Elmore, Jim Holloway, Erol Otus, Dave Sutherland, Dave Trampier, and Gary Williams.

TSR released Greyhawk Adventures in response to requests from Greyhawk fans, and the book is unusual among AD&D hardcover manuals in that the author solicited input from the gaming community about what subjects to include in the book before publishing it. Ward later credited the 511 letters he received as the major impetus for including the rules for zero-level characters and adventures, both topics that had not been previously included in hardcover AD&D manuals.

Unlike many AD&D manuals, Greyhawk Adventures was not reissued for the 2nd or 3rd editions of D&D, although much of its content was incorporated into other supplements. All but two of the monsters introduced in Greyhawk Adventures, for example, reappeared in the Greyhawk Adventures Monstrous Compendium appendix (ISBN 0-88038-836-6).

Greyhawk Adventures takes its name and logo from a series of novels written by Gary Gygax and Rose Estes, published by TSR in the 1980s. The logo was later used on several 2nd Edition AD&D products, such as City of Skulls and The Marklands.

== Reception ==
Lisa Stevens reviewed the module in the December 1988 issue of White Wolf magazine. She thought that it was worth the price for those involved in Greyhawk campaigns but less so for those not. She stated: "If you like to tinker with good ideas that have some flaws, then you will enjoy working with this product. ... If you can cull out the refuse. you will find a nice hunk of gold at the bottom, but you'll have to work for it. This book might more rightly be titled, 'The Good, the Bad, and the Ugly' or 'Hard Habit to Break'." Stevens rated the product a 4 out of 5 for Appearance, 3 for Complexity, and 2 for Content, Playability, and her overall rating.

Jim Bambra reviewed Greyhawk Adventures for Dragon magazine No. 143 (March 1989). Bambra commented on the book: "As a sourcebook which further elaborates on an existing world, Greyhawk Adventures is a collection of independent sections with little in the way of crossover between each one. The writing style reflects the large number of contributors involved, with the tone varying from lively and evocative to dry and rules-orientated, with the emphasis on mechanics." He noted that while the book was primarily aimed at World of Greyhawk fans, players of campaigns set in other worlds would find much to interest them, such as new spells, magical items, and monsters; also, the descriptions of NPCs and of Greyhawk's deities and clerics can act as templates for similar deities and characters in other campaigns, and the adventures and the section on zero-level characters could also be used in any campaign. Bambra felt that some of the content would be less likely to be of interest to non-Greyhawk campaign players, but that it can still serve as a source of inspiration: "Greyhawk Adventures has something in it for everyone, but its wide diversity of topics tends to dilute its overall impact and usefulness." He found the section on avatars useful, but felt that "it would have benefited by describing the things that avatars do and providing motivations for why a particular deity would send an avatar to Oerth in the first place". Bambra felt that most of the information on how to play clerics was readily accessible, but that the rules on spheres would only come to light once the AD&D 2nd Edition game was published. He felt that while the book defined clerics well in game terms, it could have included more information on how clerics should conduct themselves in the pursuit of their deities' aims and more information detailing the myths and legends associated with the deities. He considered the "Monsters of Greyhawk" section neatly laid out with all the essential information presented in a tabulated form, an insight into how the AD&D 2nd Edition game would likely be presented, and he considered the new monsters "useful". Bambra concludes the review with an overall evaluation of the book: "Greyhawk Adventures attempts to be many things to many people. Assuming this is its aim, it succeeds admirably, for everyone who looks at it will find something of interest. However, considered as a whole, it is less successful. Even hardened fans of the World of Greyhawk fantasy setting may be disappointed as Greyhawk Adventures adds little to the background of Oerth, instead providing useful add-ons and enhancements. [...] Don’t get me wrong—Greyhawk Adventures includes some very good material, and it's a useful purchase for those of you looking for new spells, magical items, ways to make clerics more interesting, and for inspiration in the adventure department. It's just that I cannot shake the feeling that Greyhawk Adventures has spread itself too thin."

Scott Taylor of Black Gate listed the Greyhawk Adventures as #9 on the list of "Top 10 'Orange Spine' AD&D Hardcovers By Jeff Easley, saying "who doesn't like a ultra-demon looking thing and a griffon rider with a magic sword?"

== Reviews ==
- Casus Belli #47

== See also ==
- World of Greyhawk Fantasy Game Setting
- From the Ashes (Dungeons & Dragons)
- Greyhawk: The Adventure Begins
- Living Greyhawk Gazetteer
