= Age of Worms =

Dungeon & Dragons Adventure Path

Front cover of Dungeon Issue 124 (July 2005), illustrated by Wayne Reynolds, which featured the first chapter of Age of Worms.

The Age of Worms Adventure Path (or simply Age of Worms) is the second Adventure Path for the Dungeons & Dragons role-playing game, published over twelve installments from July 2005 through June 2006 in Dungeon magazine. A campaign designed to take player characters from 1st to 20th level, Age of Worms was given an Honorable Mention in the "Best Adventure" category of the 2007 ENnie Awards.

== Story ==
The Age of Worms is an age of darkness and despair heard of only in ancient prophecies. According to these prophecies, the Herald of the Age of Worms is said to be the undead deity Kyuss, the Wormgod, who is somehow involved with the Ebon Triad, a cult introduced in the previous Adventure Path, Shackled City.

== Setting ==
Age of Worms differs from the first Adventure Path primarily in its use of established Greyhawk characters, locations such as the Free City of Greyhawk, and items such as the Rod of Seven Parts. Though the series is set in a somewhat abstracted World of Greyhawk (the Free City of Greyhawk becomes the Free City, etc.), supplements were made available online that gave conversion notes for Dungeon Masters wishing to adapt it to other Dungeons & Dragons campaign settings such as Eberron or Forgotten Realms.

== Summary ==
Age of Worms develops from a small town of Diamond Lake, leads to intrigue in the Free City, and then on to a mysterious cult that serves as a front to bring about the events leading up to the Age of Worms. As the players encounter the various architects of the plot, they uncover the nature of the coming age, and battle the ultimate masterminds behind it. In the end, they face off against the two primary antagonists: Dragotha, a powerful undead dragon, and his master, Kyuss.

The entire Adventure Path consists of the following installments:

Chapter	Title	Authors	Illustrators	Levels	Issue	Date
1	"The Whispering Cairn"	Erik Mona	Joachim Barrum, Chad Du Lac, Steve Prescott, Eva Weidermann, Jim Zubkavich; Wayne Reynolds (cover); Robert Lazzaretti (cartography for entire series), Darlene Pekul (calligraphy for entire series)	1–3	124	July 2005
A band of would-be adventurers explore a long-lost tomb near Diamond Lake and uncover a necromancer's conspiracy with local merchants.
2	"The Three Faces of Evil"	Mike Mearls	J. Barrum, S. Prescott, E. Weidermann	3–4	125	August 2005
The heroes penetrate a tripartite cult operating in secret underneath Dourstone Mine, hoping to merge their three unholy deities. The name of Kyuss and rumors of worm-eaten dead arise.
3	"Encounter at Blackwall Keep"	Sean K. Reynolds	J. Barrum, S. Prescott, E. Weidermann	5–6	126	September 2005
While seeking out a sage to shed light on their recent discoveries, the heroes come upon Blackwall Keep, an outpost beset by lizardfolk, and a rescue mission ensues.
4	"The Hall of Harsh Reflections"	Jason Bulmahn	J. Barrum, S. Prescott, E. Weidermann	7–8	127	October 2005
In the enormous Free City, doppelganger assassins lead the heroes to an illithid dealing in unholy relics.
5	"The Champion's Belt"	Tito Leati, Richard Pett	J. Barrum, Matt Dixon, S. Prescott, E. Weidermann; Howard Lyon (cover)	9–10	128	November 2005
In order to investigate Loris Raknian, the warlord who tried to have them killed, the heroes must enroll in the greatest gladiatorial tournament in the world – the Free City Games. What they end up with is an Apostle of Kyuss come to claim the blood of a champion.
6	"A Gathering of Winds"	Wolfgang Baur	J. Barrum, S. Prescott, E. Weidermann	11–12	129	December 2005
The heroes return to Diamond Lake to seek out their patron Allustan and present him with all they've learned of the cult of Kyuss and their activity. When they find that the dragon Ilthane has leveled Allustan's home, they must defeat it and re-enter the Whispering Cairn to seek out the missing wizard.
7	"The Spire of Long Shadows"	Jesse Decker	J. Barrum, S. Prescott, E. Weidermann	13–14	130	January 2006
Allustan's mentor Manzorian tells the heroes of his colleague Balakarde, who explored the site of Kyuss' divine apotheosis. When they follow in Balakarde's footsteps, the heroes find a site with tales of its own to tell of Kyuss and his blasphemous practices, as well as the alien architect of the Age of Worms.
8	"The Prince of Redhand"	Richard Pett	J. Barrum, S. Prescott, E. Weidermann	15–16	131	February 2006
Manzorian tells the heroes to seek out Lashonna, sorcerous advisor to tyrannical Prince Zeech of Redhand and possibly the last person to see Balakarde alive. To meet her, however, the heroes must make it through Prince Zeech's extravagant ball and be on their best behavior.
9	"The Library of Last Resort"	Nicolas Logue	J. Barrum, S. Prescott, E. Weidermann	16–17	132	March 2006
Once the heroes meet Lashonna, she sends them to the Isle of Last Resort, to uncover the location of the phylactery of Kyuss' general, the dracolich Dragotha. A power-hungry cleric of Vecna and his minions have the same idea, however.
10	"Kings of the Rift"	Greg A. Vaughan	J. Barrum, S. Prescott, E. Weidermann; David Hudnut (cover)	18–19	133	April 2006
Now that the heroes know where to find Dragotha's phylactery, they must get it. This involves infiltrating a huge fortress currently occupied by giants and besieged by dragons.
11	"Into the Wormcrawl Fissure"	James Jacobs	J. Barrum, S. Prescott, E. Weidermann; Dan Scott (cover)	19–20	134	May 2006
With Dragotha's phylactery secured, the heroes must travel into the deadly Wormcrawl Fissure to reunite Balakarde's broken spirit and either destroy or blackmail Kyuss' dracolich general.
12	"Dawn of a New Age"	Tito Leati	J. Barrum, S. Prescott, E. Weidermann; Wayne Reynolds (cover)	20–21	135	June 2006
The new Spire is complete, and Alhaster is under siege from legions of Kyuss' undead minions. The heroes must battle their way through the city and fight back the darkness before confronting the Wormgod himself.
