= Mordenkainen =

Fictional character in Dungeons & Dragons

- World of Greyhawk character
- Mordenkainen, as depicted on the cover of Mordenkainen's Fantastic Adventure (TSR, Inc., 1984)

In-universe information
- Race: Human
- Gender: Male
- Class: Wizard
- Alignment: Neutral
- Home: Yatil Mountains

Mordenkainen is a fictional wizard from the World of Greyhawk campaign setting for the Dungeons & Dragons roleplaying game. He was created by Gary Gygax as a player character, only months after the start of Gygax's Greyhawk campaign and is therefore one of the oldest characters continuously associated with Dungeons & Dragons.

Once Gygax was forced out of TSR, Inc., he lost creative control of Mordenkainen. TSR then made Mordenkainen a powerful wizard with strong convictions against moral absolutes, and the leader of the Circle of Eight, a cabal of eight powerful wizards. In fiction associated with the World of Greyhawk, he has played diverse roles as both protagonist and antagonist.

Official publications for the World of Greyhawk sometimes contradict each other regarding Mordenkainen. It is clear, however, that he is an important figure in the fictional history of the Flanaess.

== Creative origins ==
In late 1972, Gary Gygax created Castle Greyhawk and the dungeons beneath it. After a few months of almost non-stop play as the Dungeon Master, Gygax asked one of the players, Rob Kuntz, to become co-Dungeon Master, which would allow Gygax an opportunity to experience the game as a player. Gygax subsequently created several characters, including a 1st-level wizard in early 1973. Gygax was interested in Finnish mythology, and named the wizard Mordenkainen, a portmanteau of the mythical heroes Mordecai and Lemminkäinen. Kuntz started a role-playing campaign in his Kalibruhn setting in 1973, in which Mordenkainen and Yrag developed as player characters of Gary Gygax.

He was to become Gygax's most famous character, and also his favorite to play. Over several years of gameplay, mainly from 1973 to 1985, Gygax developed the character traits and adventures with which Mordenkainen would become associated, as well as raising the wizard to "twenty-something levels". During this period, Gygax united Mordenkainen with seven of his other characters to form the Circle of Eight. During his lifetime, Gygax never disclosed any of Mordenkainen's original game statistics.

When Gygax was forced out of TSR in 1985, he lost the rights to most of the characters he had mentioned in TSR publications, including Mordenkainen. TSR subsequently changed Mordenkainen in ways unforeseen by his creator. When the Greyhawk campaign world was reset in 1991's From the Ashes, Mordenkainen was refashioned as the world's most powerful wizard. The Circle of Eight was now described as a cabal of eight wizards supervised by Mordenkainen, who together sought to balance the forces of good and evil.

Mordenkainen is one of the famous mages whose spells were included in the 1988 Greyhawk Adventures hardbound. His name has been associated with various spells published in the Dungeons & Dragons system of magic.

== Publishing history ==
Mordenkainen's AD&D statistics were first published in The Rogues Gallery (1980), although Gary Gygax was later emphatic that he never gave author Brian Blume any information about the wizard, and insisted that Blume had been forced to make up the published statistics. Variations on Mordenkainen's AD&D statistics were also published in Mordenkainen's Fantastic Adventure (1984), The City of Greyhawk (1989) and Epic Level Handbook (2002). The "legendary Mordenkainen" was featured as a card in the Spellfire trading card game in 1994.

He was also mentioned in the following publications:

- Expedition to the Ruins of Greyhawk (2007)
- "The Wizards Three" series of articles from Dragon Magazine
- Mordenkainen's Magnificent Emporium (2011)
- Mordenkainen's Tome of Foes (2018)
- Mordenkainen Presents: Monsters of the Multiverse (2022)

Mordenkainen also figured prominently in the parody adventure Castle Greyhawk (1988), in which he runs a film studio, possibly a reference to Gary Gygax's work at the time as TSR's liaison to Hollywood while he was developing the Dungeons & Dragons cartoon and other projects.

Mordenkainen appears in material for the fifth edition of D&D, including Curse of Strahd (2016), and Baldur's Gate: Descent into Avernus (2019).

Mordenkainen's name appeared in certain spells within the core rulebooks of the game's 3rd edition's as one of the few elements from Greyhawk, even though that was designated as the core setting. Spells named after Mordenkainen also appear in D&D-based computer games like Neverwinter Nights.

At San Diego Comic-Con 2026, Dark Horse Comics announced a new ongoing series, titled Dungeons & Dragons, scheduled to debut in November 2026. Set in the Forgotten Realms, the series will feature a depowered Mordenkainen attempting to stop a draconic apocalypse while teaming up with other characters, such as Volo and Tasha. It will be written by Jackson Lanzing and Collin Kelly with pencils by Ibraim Roberson, ink by Arabson Oliveira, and colors by Dan Brown.

== Description ==
Mordenkainen is described as tall, with a greyly streaked Van Dyke beard, wearing long boots and carrying a staff.

Mordenkainen keeps his own counsel and does not tolerate fools. He operates according to a theory based on power balance and Neutrality, trying to keep neither Good nor Evil from getting the upper hand; he operates very much from the shadows.

== Reception ==
Mordenkainen was #9 on Game Rant's 2020 "10 Must-Have NPCs In Dungeons & Dragons Lore To Make Your Campaigns Awesome" list — the article states that "As an NPC, players might search for Mordenkainen for his expertise in the magical arts. After all, Mordenkainen heads the Circle of Eight, a group of Wizards and prolific spell inventors. Campaigns planning on adapting Curse of Strahd may also include Mordenkainen as an NPC they need to save– or face, depending on the circumstances."

Writer Aubrey Sherman called Mordenkainen one "of Dungeons & Dragons's most famous wizards" and found similarities with both Elminster and Gandalf with respect to appearance, demeanor, outlook and importance in their respective worlds.

Backstab magazine contributor Kaneda considered Mordenkainen one of the greatest magicians from the Greyhawk campaign setting.

== See also ==
- List of Greyhawk characters
