= Wargamer's Digest =

Wargaming magazine

Wargamer's Digest was a wargaming magazine created by Gene McCoy that was published from 1973 to 2000 (from 1984 to 2000 as Military Digest). It is notable as one of the earliest publications to publish the work of Gary Gygax, and for the high regard that military professionals and academics showed for its military scenarios and simulations.

== Editor-in-chief ==
Gene McCoy, an army veteran, was the editor-in-chief.

== History ==
In 1974 Wargamer's Digest published Gygax's rules for wargaming in an ancient setting. Originally written in 1969, Gygax revised and expanded them for publication in Wargamer's Digest. The magazine also sold war games through its "Reader's Service Department." This included the earliest TSR products. In 1975, it published one of Gygax's earliest adventures for Dungeons & Dragons, "The Magician's Ring."

== Wargamer's Digest World War Two war gaming rules. ==
Between 1973 and 1975 Gene McCoy printed a micro-armor rules framework in Wargamer's Digest. The rules, as they existed, were scattered across a number of magazines, with the last being printed in Volume 3, Issue 12. While by no means a finished product, these rules introduced a number of new figure-gaming concepts, which in the micro-armor world were well ahead of their time. An example was each base or figure represented more than one vehicle.

The rules were originally designed for 1/87 or 1/72 scale figures, with a scale of 1 inch for each 100 yards. This changed in Volume 2 Issue 11 to 1 inch for each 50 yards. Each figure represented 9 vehicles, with the scale for infantry and artillery differing. By the last issue the scale had standardized to 4 to 6 vehicles or guns, although the infantry scale was not as clearly defined. The game-turn duration was never stated, but would have ranged from 15 minutes to 60 minutes a game-turn.

The rules allowed for combined movement and firing, as well as firing in the opposing players game turn. While the implementation of these rules concepts was basic, they represented a revolutionary step forward in micro-armor rules. The firing system consisted of cross referencing the gun and target armor to arrive at a penetration range. If the direct fire was at half this range or less two dice were used, other wise only one die was used. No firing beyond penetration range was allowed. While not revolutionary the system was elegant and provided a surprising level of detail. Later version introduced a percentage to kill die roll as well.

=== Publication ===
By 1975 the rules had developed to the point that McCoy decided to publish them. An early type of crowd funding was used with an intended publishing date of 1978, but unfortunately the rules were never published. An unofficial version was created based on available source material and published on the Yahoo group and IO:Group site.
