= Dungeon (magazine) =

Magazine related to the Dungeons & Dragons role-playing game

Dungeon Adventures
- "Into the Fire" by Keith Parkinson; Cover of Dungeon Adventures Issue 1 Dated September/October 1986
- Editor: Editors Roger E. Moore; Barbara G. Young; Wolfgang H. Baur; Dave Gross; Anthony J. Bryant; Michelle Vuckovich; Christopher Perkins; Chris Thomasson Editors-in-Chief Kim Mohan; Pierce B. Watters; Bill Slavicsek; Christopher Perkins; Erik Mona; James Jacobs; Chris Youngs; Steve Winter
- Categories: Role-playing game
- Frequency: Print; Bimonthly (1–97); Monthly (98–150); Online; Bimonthly (151–154); Monthly (155–221)
- Publisher: Publishers Michael H. Cook; James M. Ward; Brian Thomsen; Pierce B. Watters; Wendy Noritake; Johnny L. Wilson; Lisa Stevens; Keith Strohm; Erik Mona
- Total circulation: 31,465 (October 2005 – September 2006)
- First issue: September/October 1986
- Final issue Number: Sept. 2007 (print) & Dec. 2013 (digital); 150 (print) & 221 (digital)
- Company: TSR (1–62); WotC (63–93, 151–221); Paizo (94–150)
- Country: United States
- Based in: Lake Geneva, WI (TSR); Renton, WA (WotC); Bellevue, WA (Paizo)
- Language: English
- ISSN: 0890-7102

Dungeon (originally published as Dungeon: Adventures for TSR Role-Playing Games) was one of the two official magazines targeting consumers of the Dungeons & Dragons role-playing game and associated products; Dragon was the other.

Dungeon was first published by TSR, Inc. in 1986 as a bimonthly periodical. It went monthly in May 2003 and ceased print publication altogether in September 2007 with Issue 150. Starting in 2008, Dungeon and its more widely read sister publication, Dragon, went to an online-only format published by Wizards of the Coast. Both magazines went on hiatus at the end of 2013, with Dungeon #221 being the last issue released.

== History ==
=== TSR ===
Dungeon (initially titled Dungeon Adventures) first received mention in the editor's column of Dragon Issue 107 (March 1986). Lacking a title at that point, it was described as "a new magazine filled entirely with modules" made available "by subscription only" that would debut "in the late summer or early fall" of 1986 and "come out once every two months".

The publication's original editor, Roger E. Moore, elaborated on this basic outline:

Dungeon Adventures is a new periodical from TSR, Inc., in which you, the readers, may share your own adventures and scenarios from AD&D and D&D gaming with the legions of other fantasy gamers. Each issue offers a number of fairly short (but often quite complicated and long-playing) modules, selected from the best we receive.
What kind of adventures do you want to see? We're going to offer as broad a spectrum of material as possible: dungeon crawls, wilderness camp-outs, Oriental Adventures modules, solo quests, tournament designs, Battlesystem scenarios, and more.

The premiere issue of Dungeon: Adventures for TSR Role-Playing Games was undated, but "November/December 1986" appears on the cover of the subsequent issue, and Moore stated that it had been released prior to the November issue of Dragon. The magazine's format consisted of 64 pages of short D&D and AD&D game adventures of various lengths, themes, and tones, written by both amateur and professional fantasy role-playing writers.

In conjunction with the first anniversary of Dungeon Adventures, Ken Rolston included a brief review in Issue 125 (September 1987) of Dragon. Regarding the modules themselves, he called them "[c]heap and cheerful, full of the basic fun of D&D games", and said that they reminded him of "the selection of game sessions you find at gaming conventions or in old-fashioned modules". Rolston commented on the anthology format, which allowed writers to "publish fine little bits" and provided "great training grounds for new writers" that offered "an opportunity to experiment with offbeat themes and tones". Rolston concluded that "sophisticated gamers will find a lot to snicker at here, but there are some cute ideas", and added that the "writing ranges from young and enthusiastic to polished, and when compared with some of TSR's current modules...the quality of the layout and graphics is quite decent."

=== Wizards of the Coast ===
With the sale of TSR due to solvency concerns, the magazine came under the umbrella of Wizards of the Coast in 1997, and the company printed the next 30 issues. With the release of Issue #78 in January 2000, the long title printed on the cover was simplified from Dungeon: Adventures for TSR Role-Playing Games to Dungeon: Adventures. By Issue #82 (August 2000) it was simplified again to Dungeon.

=== Paizo ===
In late 2002, Paizo Publishing acquired publishing rights to both Dungeon and Dragon magazine titles as part of a move by Wizards of the Coast to divest business ventures not related to its core business.

=== Return to Wizards of the Coast ===
On April 18, 2007, Wizards of the Coast announced that Paizo would cease publication of Dungeon in September of that year. Scott Rouse, senior brand manager of Dungeons & Dragons at Wizards of the Coast, stated, "Today the internet is where people go to get this kind of information. By moving to an online model we are using a delivery system that broadens our reach to fans around the world."

Coinciding with the release of the 4th edition of Dungeons & Dragons in June 2008, Wizards of the Coast launched a website that included online versions of Dungeon and Dragon magazines for subscribers. In this new format, Dungeon (now subtitled A Dungeons & Dragons Roleplaying Game Supplement) retained its mandate to deliver adventures of varying lengths and levels as well as articles with information and advice for DMs. Mainstay columns such as "Dungeoncraft" (written by James Wyatt) were retained, and DM-focused articles that formerly appeared in Dragon magazine (like "Save My Game") were incorporated into Dungeon, making it a "one-stop shop" for DMs. The magazine shifted to a landscape format with the intent of making the articles and adventures more readable onscreen. Content was released daily and gathered into PDF compilations on a monthly basis. In May 2011, Wizards of the Coast stopped the monthly compilations and left content in single article format. In October 2012, Wizards of the Coast resumed monthly compilations.

==== Cessation ====
In the September 2013 issue of Dragon (#427) an article by Wizards of the Coast game designer and editor Chris Perkins announced that both Dragon and its sibling publication Dungeon would be going on hiatus starting January 2014 pending the release of the Dungeons & Dragons 5th edition product line. The final online version was Issue #221 in December 2013. The successor magazine, called Dragon+, was subsequently released online on 30 April 2015.

== Content ==
Each issue featured a variety of self-contained, pre-scripted, play-tested game scenarios, often called "modules", "adventures" or "scenarios". Dungeon Masters (DMs) could either enact these adventures with their respective player groups as written or adapt them to their own campaign settings. Dungeon aimed to save DMs time and effort in preparing game sessions for their players by providing a full complement of ideas, hooks, plots, adversaries, creatures, illustrations, maps, hand-outs, and character dialogue. It was a resource containing several modules per issue, significantly cheaper than standard-format modules.

From Dungeon's founding in 1986, it published content that could be used in a variety of forms of Dungeons & Dragons systems, much like its sister magazine, Dragon. When Wizards of the Coast merged all D&D product lines into one, 2000's 3rd Edition, Dungeon published exclusively 3E content between September 2000's issue 82 and July 2003's issue 100, which shifted to 3.5E. With the release of 4th Edition in June 2008, issue 155 saw the 3.5E content dropped and focused exclusively on 4E. Like Dragon, Dungeon was cancelled by Wizards of the Coast before the release of 5th Edition.

=== Polyhedron ===
Polyhedron, the monthly membership publication of the Role-Playing Game Association, was combined with Dungeon into a single magazine beginning with Issue 90 (January 2002) and lasting until Issue 111 (June 2004). Many of the Polyhedron sections presented complete mini-games for the d20 system in genres other than fantasy.

Editor Erik Mona changed the format in September 2004, starting with Issue 114, discontinuing the Polyhedron component and focusing solely on Dungeons & Dragons. Each issue included three adventures, one each for low, medium, and high levels. A few issues each year also contained another substantial article which provided further details on the setting of one of the adventures (Previously, Dungeon almost never had features other than modules). Following the adventures and articles, many issues included the three-page "Dungeoncraft" column, at the time written by Monte Cook, as well as a handful of shorter articles on various subjects, collectively titled the "Campaign Workbook".

=== Adventure Paths ===
Beginning in 2003, Dungeon magazine featured episodic, multi-part adventures, referred to as "Adventure Paths", which were designed to take a group of player characters from the beginning of their adventuring careers (1st level) through epic levels (20th and above). As of April 2013, four such serials were published: Shackled City, Age of Worms, Savage Tide, and Scales of War. In August 2005 the Shackled City Adventure Path was collected into a hardcover edition with various revisions and corrections, new background information, and a bonus adventure meant to fill a gap near the beginning of the series. Similarly, several shorter campaign arcs (typically consisting of three parts) and various sporadic, open-ended series and side treks were featured in these later issues.

== Recognition ==
Awards

- 1990: Origins Award for Best Professional Adventure Gaming Magazine of 1989
- 1991: Origins Award for Best Professional Adventure Gaming Magazine of 1990
- 2002: ENnie Award for Best Aid or Accessory
- 2005: ENnie Awards for Best Cartography ("World Map of Greyhawk", Issues 118–121), Best Adventure (Maure Castle, Issue 112), Best Aid or Accessory (Dungeon magazine), and Best Free Product or Web Enhancement (Maps and handouts, Issues 114–122)
- 2006: ENnie Awards for Best Cartography, Best Adventure, and Best Campaign Setting/Setting Supplement (Shackled City Adventure Path); and Best Free Product or Web Enhancement (Age of Worms Overload)
- 2007: Origins Award for Best Fiction Publication of the Year 2006
- 2007: ENnie Award for Best Free Product (Savage Tide Player's Guide)

Nominations

- 2006: Origins Award for Best Role-Playing Game Supplement of the Year 2005 (Shackled City hardcover)
- 2006: ENnie Award for Best Production Values, Best d20/d20 OGL Product, and Best Product (Shackled City Adventure Path)
- 2007: Origins Award for Best Fiction Publication of the Year 2006
- 2007: ENnie Award for Best Adventure (Age of Worms Adventure Path)
