= Frederick Weining =

Role-playing designer

Frederick Weining is among those credited for design of the Dungeons & Dragons Gazetteer and the Living Greyhawk Gazetteer, both published by Wizards of the Coast. He has also authored or co-authored a number of Greyhawk articles for the Living Greyhawk Journal, the Oerth Journal, and Dragon.

== Works ==
- Holian, Gary, Erik Mona, Sean K. Reynolds, and Frederick Weining. D&D Gazetteer. Renton, WA: Wizards of the Coast, 2000.
- -----. Living Greyhawk Gazetteer. Renton, WA: Wizards of the Coast, 2000.
- Reynolds, Sean K., Frederick Weining, and Erik Mona. "Blood of Heroes." Living Greyhawk Journal #3. Renton, WA: Wizards of the Coast, 2001.
- Weining, Frederick. "The Archbarony of Blackmoor." Oerth Journal #5. Council of Greyhawk, 1997. Available online:
- -----. "Playing Pieces: Denizens of Darkness." Dragon #300. Bellevue, WA: Paizo Publishing, 2002.
- -----. "Playing Pieces: The Despotrix of Hardby." Living Greyhawk Journal #1. Renton, WA: Wizards of the Coast, 2000.
- -----. "The Rock of the West." Living Greyhawk Journal #5. Renton, WA: Wizards of the Coast, 2001.
- -----. "The Vault of the Drow." Dragon #298. Bellevue, WA: Paizo Publishing, 2002.
