= The City of Skulls =

Role-playing game adventure

- Code: WGR6
- TSR product code: 9405
- Rules required: 2nd Ed AD&D
- Character levels: 9 - 12
- Campaign setting: Greyhawk
- Authors: Carl Sargent
- First published: 1993

The City of Skulls is an adventure module for the Dungeons & Dragons fantasy roleplaying game, set in the game's World of Greyhawk campaign setting.

== Plot summary ==
The adventure takes place in the Kingdom of Furyondy and the Empire of Iuz following the Greyhawk Wars. The city referenced in the book's title is Dorakaa, the capital of Iuz's empire.

== Publication history ==
The module bears the code WGR6 and was published by TSR, Inc. in 1993 for the second edition Advanced Dungeons & Dragons rules.

The module was written by Carl Sargent with cover art by Jeff Easley and interior art by Eric Hotz.

The publication was designed for use with the From the Ashes updated setting information for Greyhawk and Sargent's sourcebooks Iuz the Evil and The Marklands. None of these are strictly necessary for use of the module, however.

== Reception ==
City of Skulls was ranked the 26th greatest Dungeons & Dragons adventure of all time by Dungeon magazine in 2004, on the 30th anniversary of the Dungeons & Dragons game.
