= Flames of the Falcon =

Dungeons & Dragons adventure module

- The cover of Falconmaster, with art by Ken Frank, depicts an altar with a falcon statue over flames.
- Code: WGA3
- TSR product code: 9302
- Rules required: Advanced Dungeons & Dragons 2nd edition
- Character levels: 5 - 7
- Campaign setting: Greyhawk
- Authors: Richard W. and Anne Brown
- First published: 1990

Linked modules
- WGA1, WGA2, WGA3, WGA4

Flames of the Falcon is an adventure module published in 1990 for the Advanced Dungeons & Dragons fantasy role-playing game.

== Plot summary ==
Flames of the Falcon is the second sequel to Falcon's Revenge and direct sequel to Falconmaster. The scenario involves the player characters attempts to stop a vengeful cleric of the deity Iuz from terrorizing the city of Greyhawk. The module includes fold-up buildings.

== Publication history ==
WGA3 Flames of the Falcon was written by Richard W. and Anne Brown, with a cover by Ken Frank, and was published by TSR in 1990 as a 64-page booklet with cardstock sheets and an outer folder.

This adventure is part of a series of three scenarios that starts with WGA1 Falcon's Revenge, continues with WGA2 Falconmaster, and concludes with WGA3 Flames of the Falcon.
