= Greyhawk Player's Guide =

Greyhawk supplement by Anne Brown

Player's Guide
- AD&D Second Edition
- Author: Anne Brown
- Publication date: 1998
- Media type: Sourcebook

The Player's Guide, also known as the Greyhawk Player's Guide or the Player's Guide to Greyhawk, is a sourcebook for the World of Greyhawk campaign setting for the Dungeons & Dragons role-playing game. Written by Anne Brown, the work was published by Wizards of the Coast under its TSR imprint in 1998.

== Contents ==
The Player's Guide contains information intended for players, rather than dungeon masters. The book emphasizes character development over comprehensive coverage, giving an overview of the history, culture, and geography of the world of Oerth. It also includes small descriptions of important characters, and covers various humanoid races. The book includes some maps of the world as well as Greyhawk City. The book contains new player character class kits, and role-playing tips.

== Publication history ==
The Player's Guide was published as part of TSR's relaunch of the Greyhawk line, and was released before The Adventure Begins. It was published in June 1998.

== Reception ==
James MacDuff reviewed the Player's Guide in 1998, in Shadis #50; MacDuff also reviewed Return of the Eight and The Adventure Begins, and called the Player's Guide "easily the most accessible of the three products". He liked the 11" X 16" maps compared to the more unwieldy folding maps from earlier Greyhawk sets. MacDuff called the book "a treasure" for players, saying it "contains enough new stuff to entice old Greyhawk hands, and unlike The Adventure Begins, shouldn't leave them wanting".

== Reviews ==
- Backstab #10
- Envoyer #22
- Casus Belli #115
- InQuest Gamer #40
