= Magic item (Dungeons & Dragons) =

Object in Dungeons & Dragons that has magical powers

In the Dungeons & Dragons fantasy role-playing game, a magic item is any object that is imbued with magic powers. These items may act on their own or be the tools of the character possessing them. Magic items have been prevalent in the game in every edition and setting, from the original edition in 1974 until the modern fifth edition. In addition to jewels and gold coins, they form part of the treasure that the players often seek in a dungeon. Magic items are generally found in treasure hoards, or recovered from fallen opponents; sometimes, a powerful or important magic item is the object of a quest.

== Development ==
=== 1st edition Advanced Dungeons & Dragons ===
In the first edition, all artifacts are classed as miscellaneous magic items, even ones that are weapons, armor, or rings. Each artifact has a certain number of Minor, Major, and Prime Powers, and of Minor, Major, and Side Effects which trigger when the item is acquired, or its Major and Prime Powers are used. The powers and effects are selected by the DM from a set of lists, so that players cannot predict the artifact's powers.

=== 2nd edition Advanced Dungeons & Dragons ===
In 1994, Encyclopedia Magica Volume One, the first of a four-volume set, was published. The series lists all of the magical items published in two decades of TSR products from "the original Dungeons & Dragons woodgrain and white box set and the first issue of The Strategic Review right up to the last product published in December of 1993". The books total more than 1500 pages across the four volumes and each volume contains over 1000 magic items. There was "no attempt to correct rule imbalances, edit entries, or even match game mechanics to one particular edition of the game".

=== 3rd edition Dungeons & Dragons ===
The 3.5 edition book Magic Item Compendium (2007) was a capstone book that reprinted, updated, organized, and regularized "numerous 3e magic items". Andy Collins, the lead designer on the project, "started this process by identifying the 'big six' magic items that took up the majority of characters' item slots: magic weapons; magic armor & shields; rings of protection; cloaks of resistance; amulets of natural armor; and ability-score boosters". Collins "identified the reasons that these [magic] items were particularly well-loved: they were cost effective, they could be improved, there was nothing else as good in their slots, they were simple, they didn't take time to activate [and] they provided effects that were required for characters to stay competitive". With this in mind, the designers then pulled items from all the 3rd and 3.5 edition books and "after looking through about 2000 magic items, they looted the best 1000 or so".

The Magic Item Compendium also showed some early hallmarks of 4th edition design: items were marked levels and some items appeared at multiple strengths. It also introduced the idea of item sets, where items of a set would improve as more were collected, which would then reappear in the 4th edition book Adventurer's Vault 2 (2009).

=== 4th edition Dungeons & Dragons ===
Many magic items in this edition "have an enhancement value" which improves a character's basic stats. This enhancement value is a "persistent, always-on" ability. Additionally, some magical items contain a daily power usable by the character.

The main categories of magic items in 4th edition are: armor, weapons, implements, rings, potions, and wondrous items ("a catch-all category"). Some magical items could only be used in a specific body slot and a "character can wear only one magical item per slot — a character can't use two arm slot items (say, bracers of defense and a shield of protection) at the same time. The body slots are neck, arms, feet, hands, head, and waist".

Ritual scrolls are single use consumable items, each of which contains a specific ritual (4th edition's equivalent of non-combat spells), halves the time required to perform that ritual and allows it to be performed without a ritual book. After it has been expended, a ritual scroll crumbles to dust. Unlike the scrolls of previous editions, 4th edition's scrolls are not classified as magical items.

=== 5th edition Dungeons & Dragons ===
The 5th edition Dungeon Master's Guide introduced the concept of Item Rarity, in which magic items are given a rating between Common, Uncommon, Rare, Very Rare, and Legendary to denote the frequency in which this item is expected to be found within the game. The only Common magic item to appear in the Dungeon Master's Guide is the Potion of Healing, with an additional list of Common items appearing in the supplementary book Xanathar's Guide to Everything (2017). Artifacts act as a 6th Rarity category for items, such as the Hand of Vecna or the Wand of Orcus, in which there is only one of this item in existence. The categories of magic items in 5th edition are: Armor, Potions, Rings, Rods, Scrolls, Staffs, Wands, Weapons, and Wondrous Items (which acts as a miscellaneous category).

A character may be required to create a magical bond with an item through a process called attunement to access the item's magical properties. The standard 5th Edition rules limit the number of these items a character can benefit from at once to three attunable items.

The upcoming supplement Arcana Unleashed (September 2026) will include a new magic item system with power levels that correspond with character level advancement.

== Notable magic items ==
Aegis-fang
The magical war hammer of Wulfgar, a character from the Forgotten Realms novels and campaign setting.
Bag of Holding
This fictional bag is capable of containing objects larger than its own size. It appears to be a common cloth sack of about 2 by 4 feet (0.61 by 1.22 m) in size and opens into a nondimensional space or a pocket dimension, making the space larger inside than it is outside. The dimension that it leads to is known as the Astral Plane.
This iconic item in the game is coveted by players because it mitigates encumbrance (the game mechanic for the carrying capacity of a player character). Since its introduction, it and concepts like it have appeared in other media.
A number of academics of different disciplines have used the term bag of holding both metaphorically and literally for something which is "bigger than it appears from the outside". Levi Keach uses knowledge about the catastrophic interaction of a bag of holding with a portable hole in the game to distinguish a sub-population from the general public.
Bag of Tricks
By reaching into this remarkable bag, a game character can pull out one of the small fuzzy items inside which then turn into some type of animal, depending on luck anything from a weasel to a rhinoceros.
Blue Crystal Staff
The Blue Crystal Staff is a magical item with healing powers in the Dragonlance campaign setting. It plays a central role in Dragonlance: Dragons of Autumn Twilight. The story of the discovery of the Staff by a barbarian named Riverwind is presented in several different versions within the Dragonlance franchise.
Deck of Many Things
A magical card deck made up of 22 cards; various positive or negative magical effects occur immediately when a card is pulled from the deck.
Created by Rob Kuntz and Gary Gygax, this magic item was introduced in 1975's Supplement I: Greyhawk. Shannon Appelcline, author of Designers & Dragons, highlighted that this item has appeared "in various Dungeon Master's Guides (1979, 1989, 2000, 2003) over the years" and a physical version was published "as an insert in Dragon #148 (August 1989)". It was listed as "a paragon-level artifact, in Dungeon #177 (April 2010)", in 4th Edition before it was included as a physical item in the Madness at Gardmore Abbey (2011) box set which listed it as "a heroic-level artifact".
The deck reappeared in the 5th Edition Dungeon Master's Guide (2014) as a legendary magic item. It was then redesigned for the 5th Edition box set The Deck of Many Things (2023) named after the magic item; this box set included an expanded physical deck of 66 cards, the Card Reference Guide, and the sourcebook The Book of Many Things, which has 22 chapters themed after the original deck and includes both player and adventure options.
Madness at Gardmore Abbey and The Book of Many Things both include guidance on using the physical prop to build an adventure based on the cards the Dungeon Master pulls.
Appelcline called it "one of D&D's most popular magic items". Thomas Wilde of The Escapist noted that the deck is "one of the oldest magic items" in Dungeons & Dragons and "has been famous for decades as a nearly guaranteed way to derail a campaign.
Any card drawn from the deck can abruptly kill, hamper, enrich, empower, or imprison a character. As it's remained mostly unchanged since its debut in 1975, the deck of many things provides an enduring snapshot of the earlier, far more lethal editions".
John Harris, in the book Exploring Roguelike Games (2020), called the deck "one of the most iconic D&D items" and "a potent slayer of" player characters. Harris opined that the item has "no strategy" as "it's just a spin of the wheel, either amazing riches or sudden, permanent death. The rational approach to that situation is to not draw, for no possible reward can make up for dying. But really, who in such a situation will fail to pull a card?"
Disks of Mishakal
The Disks of Mishakal contain the teachings of the "True Gods", in the Dragonlance campaign setting. They are described as thin disks of platinum bound together. After the Cataclysm, the disks were hidden in the ruined city Xak Tsaroth. They were guarded by the black dragon, Khisanth (Onyx). The Disks were found by the companions in the first book in the Chronicles series called Dragons of Autumn Twilight.
The player characters in the computer game Advanced Dungeons & Dragons: Heroes of the Lance must retrieve the Disks of Mishakal from the lair of Khisanth in the ruins of Xak Tsaroth. The characters must use the Disks to prevent Takhisis from creating her evil empire.
Dragonlances
The eponymous weapons of the Dragonlance campaign setting, these magical lances have a devastating effect on dragons. Dragonlances are a major factor in defeating the evil Dragonarmies in the Chronicles novels. In an earlier point in history of the setting, a character named Huma Dragonbane defeats Takhisis herself with a dragonlance, an evil goddess consistently causing strife in the novels. Huma's use of the artifact is presented in several differing versions within the franchise.
Girdle of femininity/masculinity
The girdle of femininity/masculinity first appeared in the original 1979 Dungeon Masters Guide, detailed on page 145. Such a girdle looks like an ordinary leather belt, but when worn immediately switches the wearer's sex to the opposite gender, then loses all power. Additionally, 10% of these items remove the sex of the wearer. The change causes no actual damage, but it is permanent. The Girdles are included in the first and the second editions of AD&D, their magic potent enough to be fiendishly difficult to reverse; even a Wish spell has even odds, though a deity can set things right. They appear to be absent from the third edition, though similar effects are mentioned as a possible curse outcome. Using a Girdle is the best-known if not only method to bring about such an effect. "Reverse user's gender" is also one of the random cursed item effects in the 3rd edition of D&D. One such item also makes an appearance in Baldur's Gate, where it's among the first magical objects the player finds, but only takes a Remove Curse to do away with. The webcomic The Order of the Stick introduces a Girdle early on and brings it back much later, where it's used to good effect and later yet undone with a Remove Curse.
Philter of Love
A magical potion, the fictional version of an aphrodisiac, that causes attraction of a person of the other sex and is a rare mention of love in the game.
Portable hole
In the game, a portable hole is a circle of cloth made from phase spider webs, strands of ether and beams of starlight. When deployed, it creates an extradimensional space six feet in diameter by ten feet deep. Folding the cloth causes the entrance to this space to disappear, but items placed inside the hole remain there. Sufficient air is contained in the hole to support life for up to ten minutes. If put inside a bag of holding, both items are destroyed by a dimensional rupture.
Staff of Magius
A magic staff from the world of Dragonlance, it was named after its most famous wielder from the setting's past even though it was created long before Magius obtained it. It the Dragonlance novels, it was in the possession of the main character Raistlin.

== Artifacts ==
Artifacts in the game are unique magic items with great power. Major artifacts include the ones in the following table. They are generally unique and exist for a specific purpose. Less powerful or potent artifacts, or ones that are not unique, are generally called minor artifacts.

Artifact	Campaign/Source	Reference books
Acorn of Wo Mai	Forgotten Realms: The Horde (1990)	Book of Artifacts (1993), Encyclopedia Magica Vol. 1 (1994)
Axe of the Dwarvish Lords	Eldritch Wizardry (1976)	Dungeon Master's Guide (1979), Book of Artifacts (1993), Encyclopedia Magica Vol. 1 (1994), Axe of the Dwarvish Lords (module, 1999), Dungeon Master's Guide (2024)
Crown of Horns	Forgotten Realms: City of Splendors (1994)	Netheril: Empire of Magic (1995), Volo's Guide to All Things Magical (1996), Forgotten Realms: Adventures in Faerûn (2025)
Demonomicon	The Lost Caverns of Tsojcanth (1982)	"Spellcraft: Demonomicon of Iggwilv" Dragon Magazine #336, "Iggwilv's Legacy: The Lost Caverns of Tsojcanth" Dungeon #151, Demonomicon of Iggwilv (column series published across Dragon, Dungeon, and Dragon+ between 2005 and 2015), Demonomicon (2010), Tasha's Cauldron of Everything (2020), Dungeon Master's Guide (2024)
Eye of Vecna and Hand of Vecna	Eldritch Wizardry (1976)	Dungeon Master's Guide (1979), Vecna Lives! (1990), Book of Artifacts (1993), Encyclopedia Magica Vol. 2 (1995), Dungeon Master's Guide (2024)
The Gauntlet	The Gauntlet (1984)	Encyclopedia Magica Vol. 2 (1995)
Mighty Servant of Leuk-o	Eldritch Wizardry (1976)	Dungeon Master's Guide (1979), Book of Artifacts (1993), Encyclopedia Magica Vol. 2 (1995), Tasha's Cauldron of Everything (2020)
Orb of Dragonkind	Eldritch Wizardry (1976)	Dungeon Master's Guide (1979), Book of Artifacts (1993), Encyclopedia Magica Vol. 2 (1995), Dungeon Master's Guide (2024)
Peaceful Periapt of Pax	Talons of Night (1987)	Encyclopedia Magica Vol. 2 (1995)
Rod of Seven Parts	Eldritch Wizardry (1976)	Dungeon Master's Guide (1979), Dungeon Master's Guide (1989), Book of Artifacts (1993), The Rod of Seven Parts (1996), Encyclopedia Magica Vol. 3 (1995), Arms and Equipment Guide (2003), Vecna: Eve of Ruin (2024)
Sword of Kas	Eldritch Wizardry (1976)	Vecna Lives! (1990), Book of Artifacts (1993), Encyclopedia Magica Vol. 4 (1995), Dungeon Masters Guide (2000), Open Grave: Secrets of the Undead, Dungeon Master's Guide (2014), Dungeon Master's Guide (2024)
Teeth of Dahlvar-Nar	Dungeon Master's Guide (1979)	Book of Artifacts (1993), Encyclopedia Magica Vol. 4 (1995, under "Tooth"), Tome of Magic (2006), Savage Tide (Tooth of Ahazu, Tooth of Shami-Amourae, 2007), Tasha's Cauldron of Everything (2020)
Wand of Orcus	Eldritch Wizardry (1976)	Monster Manual (1977), Encyclopedia Magica Vol. 4 (1995), Dungeon Master's Guide (2024)

== Reception ==
Michael J. Tresca, in the book The Evolution of Fantasy Role-Playing Games (2011), highlighted that both mundane and magical items are key to Dungeons & Dragons combat but are also often overlooked. Tresca wrote, "be it mundane equipment the adventurer needs to survive or endless lists of magical items that give the character an advantage, equipment provides a means of artificially inflating a character's power level. As a result, adventurers obsessively catalogued every item they owned just to stay alive". The impact of hoarding items led to character encumbrance being "largely abandoned" at game tables over the various editions of the game since the bookkeeping became "too much of a hassle". Tresca also highlighted that enhancement values to basic stats became "exaggerated" over time: "magic armor bestowed a +1 bonus to armor class, magic weapons provided a +1 bonus to hit and damage, and so forth. These bonuses extend as high as +10 in some editions of Dungeons & Dragons".

20 magic items were highlighted in Io9's 2014 "The 20 Most WTF Magical Items in Dungeons & Dragons" list and the author described them as "magical items that I will simply call 'Artifacts of Dickishness' " — the article highlights items such as the Ring of Contrariness, the Ring of Bureaucratic Wizardry, the Brooch of Number Numbing and the Horn of Baubles.

== Inspirations ==
=== Other fantasy stories ===
- The Hand and Eye of Vecna were inspired by items appearing within Michael Moorcock's Corum novels: A left hand and left eye which are able to grant whoever replaces their existing hand and eye with them unusual powers.
- Ioun stones (pronounced EYE-oon) are based on similar artifacts from Jack Vance's Dying Earth series. When functioning, these gemstones float in a circular pattern around their bearer's head, and grant various benefits based on their color and shape. In the original Jack Vance stories Ioun stones are highly prized by arch-magicians, and are acquired from a race known as the archveults, who mine them from remnants of dead stars (in his book Rhialto the Marvellous). In 2E Dungeons & Dragons it had been conjectured in Dragon magazine that Ioun stones instead come from the Positive Material Plane. Dragon #174 featured an article that included many dozens of new types of ioun stone, as well as an article about an elemental lord who hoards ioun stones on his home plane of radiance. Under 3.0/3.5 editions of the rules they are instead manufactured by spellcasters in the same manner as other magical items.
- The Vorpal Sword is taken from Lewis Carrol's poem "Jabberwocky". In Dungeons & Dragons, the sword has specific properties relating to beheading, which is the method the blade in the poem uses to slay the titular monster.

=== Folklore and mythology ===
- The Carpet of Flying is based upon the magic carpet of Persian mythology, later popularized in media through 1001 Arabian Nights and other adaptations.
