= Anne Brown (game designer) =

Writer and editor in the role-playing game industry

- Occupations: Writer, editor, game designer
- Known for: Falcon's Revenge, Falconmaster

Anne K. Brown is a writer and editor in the role-playing game industry.

== Career ==
Brown began working as an Assistant editor for Dragon magazine in 1989, on issues #147 to #151 (July–November 1989). She was later transferred to TSR's Games Division. She worked mostly as an editor, although she did design a number of modules and supplements including Falcon's Revenge, Falconmaster, and Flames of the Falcon (Greyhawk, 1990, with Richard W. Brown), Ship of Horror (Ravenloft, 1991), Unsung Heroes (Dragonlance, 1992), Aurora's Whole Realms Catalog (Forgotten Realms, 1992), and Children of the Night: Ghosts (Ravenloft, 1997). Brown was a vocal advocate within TSR of the Greyhawk setting, and designed the Player's Guide to Greyhawk (1998). Brown's Player's Guide to Greyhawk and Roger E. Moore's Return of the Eight and The Adventure Begins returned TSR to Greyhawk, and according to Shannon Appelcline "moved the setting's metaplot well beyond the Greyhawk Wars to a new era that that was lighter and more magical than that of From the Ashes".

Brown left TSR in August 1997, and did work for Fast Forward Entertainment from 2002 to 2003. She has also written educational nonfiction books for middle schoolers.

== Publications ==
- Co-author of The Storyteller’s Thesaurus (Chenault & Gray Publishing, 2013)
- Author of middle grade biography, Roger Federer (Lucent Books, 2011)
- Author of middle grade biography, Katy Perry (Lucent Books, 2011)
- Author of middle grade nonfiction, Migraines (Lucent Books, 2010)
- Author of middle grade nonfiction, Virtual Danger: Staying Safe Online (Compass Point Books, 2009)
- Author of middle grade biography, Gwen Stefani (Lucent Books, 2009)
- Author of middle grade biography, John Adams (Blackbirch Press, 2003)
- Author of young adult novel, Bigby’s Curse (TSR, Inc., 1995)
- Co-author of fantasy novels, Pools of Darkness and Pool of Twilight (TSR, Inc., 1992 & 1993)

=== Short stories ===
- "The Wolf in the Shadows," 2016, Lunar Resorts Anthology, The 77 Lost Worlds: An Apocalyptic Space game, FireSide Creations LLC
