= Roger E. Moore =

American magazine editor (born 1955)

- Born: July 11, 1955 (age 71); Winchester, Kentucky, United States
- Occupations: Game designer, editor
- Writing career
- Genre: Role-playing games

Roger E. Moore (born July 11, 1955, in Winchester, Kentucky) is a designer of role-playing games. He had a long-running tenure as editor of Dragon magazine and was the founding editor of Dungeon magazine.

== Early life ==
Moore's family moved around Kentucky for the early part of his childhood and eventually settled down outside of Louisville. Moore attended the University of Kentucky, where he majored in Astronomy before changing his major to Psychology. He married fellow student Georgia Skowlund.

== Career ==
After he graduated from college he entered the U.S. Army as a mental health counsellor. While in Fort Bragg during the summer of 1977, he first learned about role-playing games. “The place I worked at in West Germany was a combination mental-health clinic/pizza parlor/ham radio shack and library ... It was once a panzer barracks, too. I was quite bored, so I started writing articles for Dragon Magazine. I gamed heavily and met some other gamers who now write or work for magazines.” After a number of successful submissions to Dragon, Moore became a Contributing Editor. “I had a lot of time to write at work, mostly when clients were too busy to show up for appointments. I did articles on the D&D, AD&D, and Traveller games — just about anything I could find.”

After three years of duty in Mannheim, Moore went to the University of Louisville to work toward a Ph.D. in Experimental Psychology. “I wanted to work with the space program as a human-factors engineer,” says Moore. “After awhile, I realized that wasn't what I wanted, so I called up Kim Mohan and asked if he needed any help on his staff.” Moore became a regular contributor of articles to Dragon beginning in 1980. He received the Army Commendation Medal and other awards during his five-year tour of duty at Ft. Bragg, N.C. and Mannheim, West Germany.

Moore joined TSR, Inc. as a magazine editor in May 1983. Moore wrote, "I lerned alot from Pat Price and KimMohan an picked up the majorty of my edditing skills from them an learnd to pay more attension to grammer and speling then I used too pay to." Moore wrote consistently for Dragon magazine, and became editor of Dungeon Adventures magazine in 1986, and in the same year became Editor-in-Chief of Dragon when Kim Mohan resigned. Moore moved to the games division in 1993, where he became creative director of the AD&D core rules product group. He joined Wizards of the Coast in 1997 when TSR was acquired and continued to write and edit gaming materials of all sorts. Moore has written fiction for Dragonlance and other game worlds. Wizards of the Coast returned to the Greyhawk setting in 1998 with Player's Guide to Greyhawk (1998) by Anne Brown and Return of the Eight (1998) and The Adventure Begins (1998) by Moore; these three books moved the metaplot of Greyhawk to a new era. The Adventure Begins won the 1998 Origins Award for Best Roleplaying Supplement. Moore left Wizards of the Coast in late 2000.

Moore is a past member of Science Fiction and Fantasy Writers of America.

== Published books ==
- Greyhawk: The Adventure Begins. World of Greyhawk. 1998. 9577.
- Return of the Eight. World of Greyhawk: TSR, Inc. 1998. p. 64. ISBN 978-0-7869-1247-6. 9576XXX1502.
- Errand of Mercy. Forgotten Realms: TSR, Inc. 1998. ISBN 978-0-7869-0867-7.
- The Maelstrom's Eye. TSR, Inc. May 1992. ISBN 1-56076-344-2.
