= From the Ashes (Dungeons & Dragons) =

1992 role-playing game supplement by Carl Sargent

- Cover of From the Ashes
- Author: Carl Sargent
- Illustrator: Ken Frank, Valerie Valusek
- Cover artist: Jeff Easley, Erik Olson
- Language: English
- Series: World of Greyhawk
- Subject: Dungeons & Dragons
- Publisher: TSR
- Publication date: 1992
- Publication place: United States
- Media type: Boxed set
- Pages: 192
- ISBN: 1-56076-341-8

From the Ashes is a supplement for Dungeons & Dragons for the World of Greyhawk campaign setting.

== Contents ==
From the Ashes is a boxed set which includes a pair of booklets containing close to 130,000 words. Sidebars and summaries are included, as is an alphabetical directory of the Nations of Flanaess which reveals at a glance the races, populations, and other key data for more than 50 countries. A listing of adventure locations tells where all previously published Greyhawk scenarios occurred. The rune and glyph display from the original World of Greyhawk boxed set is included. A packet of reference cards is included, with most of them containing encounters and short adventures, in a format similar to that of The City of Greyhawk set. The trio of poster maps have the grid coordinates printed along the borders.

"Book One, Atlas of the Flanaess", presents a broad overview of the eastern portion of Oerik, Oerth's major continent and the primary locale for Greyhawk campaigns. It starts with a lengthy historical summary, tracing 10 centuries of events from the early assaults of the Oeridian tribes through the aftermath of the great Greyhawk Wars. The cyclopedia entries follow the history lesson and take up the bulk of the text. "Book Two, the Campaign Book" focuses on the areas in and around the Free City of Greyhawk. As a consequence of the great war, much of the Old City was incinerated. Destitute property owners who can't afford to pay for restoration watch helplessly as their neighborhoods are overrun with beggars and street urchins. In the River Quarter, authorities fish out bodies with daggers in their backs. Refugees crowd the poorer districts, trade continues to decline, and Iuz, the fiendish ruler of a vast territory in the north central Flanaess, remains a constant threat.

The set offers scenario hooks in a variety of formats and themes, and the "Tales of the Year of Peace" section lists about a dozen adventure springboards based on various Flanaess rumors. The two adventure outlines in the Campaign Book are "Into the Mistmarsh," which involves a hunt for escaped thieves, and "The Sin Eater".

== Publication history ==
It was published in 1992 by TSR as a boxed set of materials. The work was primarily designed and written by Carl Sargent, with cover art by Jeff Easley. Editing was by Anne Brown, and illustrations were by Ken Frank, Valerie Valusek, Eric Olson, and Robin Raab. This boxed set featured two 96-page books, three 32" × 21" map sheets, five monster sheets (in Monstrous Compendium format), and 20 reference cards. This set was part of the overhaul of the Greyhawk setting that began with The City of Greyhawk, followed by Greyhawk Wars.

The accessory was the first major update of the entire campaign setting to be published after the first boxed set, World of Greyhawk Fantasy Game Setting. From the Ashes focuses on the situation on the Flanaess in the immediate aftermath of the Greyhawk Wars.

The tone of the materials is intentionally darker and more grim than publications set in the pre-Wars era, and was designed to re-energize TSR's sales of Greyhawk-related publications. The set was followed by related adventure modules and sourcebooks by Sargent including The Marklands, Iuz the Evil, and The City of Skulls.

The boxed set consists of two books, Atlas of the Flanaess and Campaign Guide (both 96 pages long), as well as several maps and reference sheets.

== Reception ==
Keith H. Eisenbeis reviewed From the Ashes in White Wolf #34 (Jan./Feb., 1993), rating it a 3 out of 5 and stated that "For a gamer who wants to adventure in a setting where evil holds a greater sway and the tone is grim and apprehensive, this boxed set can work very well. Perhaps the most satisfied buyer of this product is one who likes the idea of massive changes in Greyhawk because his or her campaign has become stagnant. For those who run a classic Greyhawk campaign this boxed set has little to offer except some new details about the area surrounding Greyhawk City."

Rick Swan reviewed From the Ashes for Dragon magazine #198 (October 1993). He calls From the Ashes "ambitious", and notes that "By combining heroic tradition with elements of dark fantasy, [Carl Sargent has] come up with a Greyhawk campaign that is both familiar and refreshingly unexpected. Nearly as nasty as the Dark Sun setting, the new, grimmer Greyhawk world is made to order for players who found the original version too flabby to be much fun." He noted that this "lavish package" has "a lot of material to digest, but thankfully, the quality of the writing makes it go down easy. Sargent not only has a vivid imagination, but a strong command of the English language, a rare combination in an industry where publishers tend to value typing speed more than muscular prose. Despite the occasional creaky sentence [...] it’s a pleasure to read." While he notes that the "Thoughtful sidebars and helpful summaries enhance the set’s reference value", he complains that "despite the tight editing and logical organization, it’s not always easy to find specific entries; a subject index or an expanded table of contents would’ve helped". He also comments about the art and graphics: "To its detriment, the set emphasizes text over graphics, with few appealing visuals other than the color maps. Most of the illustrations depict generic fantasy scenes and have nothing much to do with the text they accompany. Those wanting maps of local neighborhoods or floor plans of important buildings will have to draw their own. The rune and glyph display, lifted virtually verbatim from the original World of Greyhawk boxed set, does little more than fill up a page." However, he compliments the poster maps, calling them "terrific, rendered in rich hues and clear notations. Thanks to the grid coordinates printed along the borders, it's easy to find desired locations [...] The grid system is nearly as user-friendly as individually numbered hexes and makes for less clutter." In "Book One, Atlas of the Flanaess", Swan complains that things "get off to a sluggish start" with the lengthy historical summary, noting that it is apparently necessary "to provide context and bring newcomers up to date. But it's also complicated and turgid, sort of like a lecture from a professor who left his sense of humor in his other suit." He felt that the cyclopedia entries "pick up the pace a bit. Nevertheless, the casual reader may feel overwhelmed by the sheer volume of information. [...] While much of this is interesting [...] Sargent doesn’t have the space he needs to do justice to an entire world. When you only have a few paragraphs to spend on a country, it’s tough to give more than a superficial overview." He felt that in "Book Two, the Campaign Book", Sargent "shifts into high gear as he narrows his focus on the areas in and around the Free City of Greyhawk. It’s a virtuoso performance, with a flawless mix of exposition, atmosphere, and detail. Sargent sets the stage in the opening pages by painting a bleak picture of a struggling populace. [...] Uncertainty prevails, and player characters will find plenty to keep them on their toes." Swan notes that the set's fantasy elements "stick pretty close to AD&D conventions, bad news for old-timers who’ve had their fill of sinister monsters, enchanted dungeons, and meddlesome deities. But Sargent's limber imagination enlivens even the weariest cliches. [...] Sargent has loaded the books with nifty details [...] making a trip through the text as fun as an Easter egg hunt." He calls the offered scenario hooks "a mixed bag", noting that on the adventure springboards "with only a few paragraphs per entry, there's not much to work with" and that the two adventure outlines in the "Campaign Book" are not particularly satisfying, as "Into the Mistmarsh" involves a "garden-variety hunt" and "The Sin Eater" relies too heavily on die-rolls and "climaxes with a battle that may prove to be too deadly for all but the strongest or luckiest PCs". He does note that the reference-card adventures "benefit from thoughtful development and clever staging", with "Brainstorm" being "the best of a dud-free collection". Swan concludes his review by saying, "A few years ago, I was convinced that the Greyhawk setting had reached a creative dead end. Now I’m not so sure. Carl Sargent has done a remarkable job of reshaping the rickety, make-it-up-as-you-go-along campaign of old into an intelligible whole. Flaws aside-the so-so visuals, sluggish Book One, and hit-or-miss adventures —From the Ashes stands as the definitive Greyhawk reference and the most enjoyable Greyhawk product to date."

== See also ==
- Greyhawk Adventures
- Greyhawk: The Adventure Begins
- Living Greyhawk Gazetteer
