= Falcon's Revenge =

Dungeons & Dragons adventure module

- The cover of Falcon's Revenge, with art by Ken Frank, depicts a falcon in a glass vessel.
- Code: WGA1
- TSR product code: 9279
- Rules required: Advanced Dungeons & Dragons 2nd edition
- Character levels: 5 - 7
- Campaign setting: Greyhawk
- Authors: Richard W. and Anne Brown
- First published: 1990

Linked modules
- WGA1, WGA2, WGA3, WGA4

Falcon's Revenge is an adventure module published in 1990 for the Advanced Dungeons & Dragons fantasy role-playing game.

== Plot summary ==
Falcon's Revenge is an adventure scenario in which the player characters must find an evil cult growing in the City of Greyhawk. The module includes fold-up cardstock buildings which can be used to create a site by a wharf.

== Publication history ==
WGA1 Falcon's Revenge was written by Richard W. and Anne Brown, with a cover by Ken Frank, and was published by TSR in 1990 as a 64-page booklet with cardstock sheets and an outer folder.

This adventure is part of a series of three scenarios that starts with WGA1 Falcon's Revenge, continues with WGA2 Falconmaster, and concludes with WGA3 Flames of the Falcon.

== Reviews ==
- GamesMaster International Issue 1 - Aug 1990
