= Book of Artifacts =

1993 Dungeons & Dragons supplement

- Author: David "Zeb" Cook
- Genre: Role-playing game
- Publisher: TSR
- Publication date: 1993
- Media type: Print (Hardback)

The Book of Artifacts (abbreviated as BoA) is a supplemental sourcebook to the core rules of the second edition of the Advanced Dungeons & Dragons fantasy role-playing game. This book, published by TSR, Inc. in 1993, details 50 different artifacts, special magic items found within the game at the Dungeon Master's option. The book was designed primarily by David "Zeb" Cook, with some additional design by Rich Baker, Wolfgang Baur, Steve and Glenda Burns, Bill Connors, Dale "Slade" Henson, Colin McComb, Thomas M. Reid, and David Wise. Cover art is by Fred Fields and interior art and icons were designed by Daniel Frazier.

== Introduction ==
The book's 8-page introduction on pages 3–10 provides an overview of the contents and the significance of artifacts within the game. One page is spent in an attempt to clear up some misconceptions regarding artifacts, including "Artifacts are too powerful for a campaign," "All artifacts have horrible curses that keep them from being useful," "Artifacts are just collections of random powers," "Artifacts are all created by gods that shouldn't be involved in the campaign," "Artifacts are found only in the Greyhawk campaign," "If the characters stumble across an artifact, it could ruin the campaign," "A character with an artifact will ruin the adventure," and "Artifacts are nothing but a headache." The next four pages of the introduction provide an explanation of the book's contents by chapter, defines what makes an artifact different from other magic items (an artifact is unique, has a special history, and provides an impetus for a story to be centered on it) and includes a set of guidelines on how a Dungeon Master can create a new artifact for the campaign.

The remaining three pages of the introduction serve to explain how the specific artifacts described within the book operate. It explains the common elements of how all artifacts function within a game, and details two common types of special curses an artifact might cause: artifact possession, where an artifact's will can possess a character using the item, and artifact transformation, where the artifact literally transforms a character physically and mentally over time into something else entirely. The format for the artifact descriptions found in the next section is also explained. Each artifact is given a detailed in-game history consisting of one or more paragraphs, and each one provides a section of advice on how the Dungeon Master may use the item within a campaign. Each artifact has its most significant powers detailed, each of which falls into one of five categories: constant (always in effect), invoked (activated intentionally by the character), random (determined by the Dungeon Master or by random roll), resonating (only functioning when two or more pieces of a matched set are joined), and curse (such as artifact possession, artifact transformation, or something else). Lastly, the introduction describes how each artifact has a suggested means of destruction, none of which should be easy for a character to accomplish.

== Artifacts ==
Fifty individual artifacts are described on pages 11–106. Most descriptions take up one full page, but a few require more than one page, and all are illustrated. Many of these artifacts have existed since the game's early days, and were originally found in the 1976 supplement Eldritch Wizardry: Axe of the Dwarvish Lords, Baba Yaga's Hut, Codex of the Infinite Planes, Crystal of the Ebon Flame, Hand and Eye of Vecna, Heward's Mystical Organ, Horn of Change, Invulnerable Coat of Arnd, Iron Flask of Tuerny the Merciless, Jacinth of Inestimable Beauty, Mace of Cuthbert, Machine of Lum the Mad, Mighty Servant of Leuk-o, Orbs of Dragonkind, Queen Ehlissa's Marvelous Nightingale, Regalia of Might (Regalia of Good, Regalia of Neutrality, Regalia of Evil), Ring of Gaxx, Rod of Seven Parts, Sword of Kas, and Throne of the Gods. Some of the artifacts in the Book of Artifacts originally appeared in the first edition Dungeon Master's Guide (along with the ones first found in Eldritch Wizardry) in 1979, including: Cup and Talisman of Al'Akbar, Johydee's Mask, Kuroth's Quill, Recorder of Ye'Cind, and Teeth of Dahlvar-Nar.

Many of the artifacts in this book originated within other products and magazine articles, mostly for specific campaign settings, including: Acorn of Wo-Mai (The Horde: Barbarian Campaign Setting), Apparatus (Ravenloft II: House on Gryphon Hill), Artifurnace (Spelljammer campaign set), Axe of the Emperors (Dragonlance: DLR2 Taladas - The Minotaurs), Blackjammer's Cutlass (Spelljammer: Dragon #159), Book with No End (Dungeon #3), Death Rock (Kara-Tur), Hammer of Gesen (The Horde: Barbarian Campaign Setting), Iron Bow of Gesen (The Horde: Barbarian Campaign Setting), and Triad of Betrayal (Dragonlance: Tales of the Lance). Some of the remaining artifacts made their first appearance in the Book of Artifacts, including: All-Knowing Eye of Yasmin Sira (Al-Qadim), Coin of Jisan the Bountiful (Al-Qadim), Herald of Mei Lung, Ivory Chain of Pao, Monacle of Bagthalos (Forgotten Realms), Obsidian Man of Urik (Dark Sun), Psychometron of Nerad (Dark Sun), Rod of Teeth (Dark Sun), Scepter of the Sorcerer-Kings (Forgotten Realms), Seal of Jafar al-Samal (Al-Qadim), and Silencer of Bodach (Dark Sun).

== Creating Magical Items ==
This section, from pages 107-129, describes the methods that a character uses to create ordinary magic items (not artifacts) as described in the second edition Dungeon Master's Guide and Tome of Magic. This section details how high in level a character must be to create a particular item, describes the requirements of the work area a character must have to create an item (a wizard's laboratory or a priest's altar, as the case may be), the difficulty of making a particular item, and what sort of magical materials may be needed. It also describes that in order to create an intelligent magic item, the spellcaster's life-force is transferred into the item, leaving the caster's body a lifeless husk.

== Recharging magical items ==
This section, from pages 130-136, describes how a spellcaster character can recharge an item which uses charges, such as wands, rods, staves, and some rings. It describes how this process is completed and what is required, both for wizard items and priest items.

== Appendices ==
The book ends with a set of three appendices. Appendix A, on page 137 is a list of common rechargeable magical items, referring to the book's previous section. Appendix B, on pages 138-158, is a set of random power tables that some artifacts may possess. Appendix C, on page 159, is simply a blank chart for the Dungeon Master to fill out to assign a list of songs, and their effects, for the Heward's Mystical Organ artifact.

== Reception ==
Keith H. Eisenbeis reviewed the product in a 1994 issue of White Wolf. On a scale of 1 to 5, he rated its Value and Playability at 2, the Appearance and Concepts at 3, and its Complexity at 4. He gave it an overall rating of 3.

== Reviews ==
- Backstab #15
- Australian Realms #16
- Coleção Dragon Slayer
