= Vecna =

Dungeons & Dragons character

- Greyhawk character
- As portrayed in the 3rd Edition sourcebook Deities and Demigods.
- First appearance: Eldritch Wizardry (1976)
- Created by: Brian Blume

In-universe information
- Race: Deity
- Gender: Male
- Title(s): The Arch-Lich, the Chained God, the Maimed God, Master of the Spider Throne, the Whispered One, the Dying King, the Lord of the Rotted Tower, the Undying King
- Alignment: Neutral Evil
- Home: Prime Material (Oerth)
- Power level: Greater
- Portfolio: Destructive and Evil Secrets, Magic, Hidden Knowledge, Intrigue

Vecna (/ˈvɛk.nɑː/ VEK-nah) is a fictional character appearing in the Dungeons & Dragons fantasy role-playing game. Vecna has been named one of the greatest villains in the Dungeons & Dragons franchise.

Originally appearing in the Greyhawk campaign setting, Vecna was described as a powerful wizard who became a lich. He was eventually destroyed, and his left hand and left eye were the only parts of his body to survive. Even after the character achieved godhood—being a member of the third edition's default pantheon of D&D gods (the pantheon of Oerth)—he is still described as missing both his left eye and left hand. Vecna's holy symbol is an eye in the palm of a left hand.

Vecna's "right-hand man", who ultimately became his betrayer, is Kas the Bloody-Handed, a vampire whose sword, the Sword of Kas, is also an artifact.

== Publication history ==
=== Original Dungeons & Dragons ===
In Eldritch Wizardry (1976), the third supplement to the original Dungeons & Dragons rules, Brian Blume invented two artifacts he called the Hand and Eye of Vecna. These were supposedly the only remnants of an evil lich, Vecna, who had been destroyed long ago. "The book contains no more detail on Vecna other than the fact that Kas was his bodyguard". The name Vecna was an anagram of Vance, the surname of Jack Vance, the fantasy author whose works inspired the magic system used in Dungeons & Dragons. The Hand and Eye of Vecna on the other hand were inspired by similar items that appear in the Eternal Champion series by Michael Moorcock (the Hand of Kwll and the Eye of Rhynn).

On the artifacts, Gary Gygax later said, "nary a detail of those items did [Blume] ever reveal to me".

=== 1st edition ===
The Hand and Eye of Vecna were then mentioned in the first edition Dungeon Master's Guide (1979) on page 124. During the Advanced Dungeons & Dragons years, Vecna was regarded only as a legend or myth, a long-destroyed legendary lich of great power, only able to threaten player characters who dared to use his Hand and Eye.

=== 2nd edition ===
Ten years later, in Advanced Dungeons & Dragons 2nd edition's Dungeon Master's Guide (1989), Vecna's history was expanded under the description of his Hand. With the release of the adventure Vecna Lives! in 1990, written in support of The City of Greyhawk boxed set, Vecna finally appeared in person, reimagined as a demigod, and the chief antagonist of the adventure. At the end of the adventure—presuming the players defeat Vecna—he is transported to the Ravenloft campaign setting. Vecna's history, via his artifacts, was also further developed in the supplemental sourcebook Book of Artifacts (1993). After the publication of Vecna Lives! (1990), "Vecna disappeared throughout the rest of the '90s, until Domains of Dread (1997)" which confirmed his new location in the realm of Ravenloft. However, it wasn't until 1998 that there was a Ravenloft-centered follow-through, Vecna Reborn.

In 2000, Wizards of the Coast released the last adventure to be written for the 2nd edition ruleset, Die Vecna Die!, a three-part adventure tying Greyhawk to the Ravenloft and Planescape campaign settings. In this adventure, Vecna was given the rank of a lesser god. Die Vecna Die! set up the transition between the second and third editions of D&D. According to Shannon Appelcline, the adventure "touched upon the oldest locales and the most ancient myths of the D&D game" by involving the Eye and Hand of Vecna and using them to oppose Iuz the cambion demigod.

=== 3rd and 3.5 edition ===
Wizards of the Coast continued the character's theme of ascending godhood in Dungeons & Dragons Third Edition (2000–2002) with the Player's Handbook (2000) listing him as a Lesser deity. Third Edition further raised Vecna's profile in the game, making him a member of the game's "core pantheon". Vecna's alignment was changed from Lawful Evil to Neutral Evil in Third Edition, and no in-game explanation has surfaced. Vecna's role in the 3rd edition Greyhawk setting was defined in the Living Greyhawk Gazetteer (2000). Vecna is detailed in Deities and Demigods (2002). On the deities of the Greyhawk setting, Matthew Attanasio, for CBR, wrote, "Vecna, a lich who hordes [sic] dark secrets, covets incredible power and holds dominion over the undead, is perhaps the most infamous of these deities".

Vecna appears in the revised Player's Handbook (2003) for Dungeons & Dragons 3.5 edition (2003–2007). His priesthood is detailed for this edition in Complete Divine (2004). Vecna was one of the deities featured in Libris Mortis (2004). Vecna and his priesthood were expanded upon in Dragon #348, in the "Core Beliefs" column.

=== 4th edition ===
Vecna appears as one of the deities described in the 2008 Dungeon Master's Guide for Dungeons & Dragons 4th edition. He is primarily the god of secrets. The Hand of Vecna has also made its return for this edition of the game. Vecna was given a set of statistics in Open Grave (2008). Vecna was the name of the Wizards of the Coast's server that hosted and handled the new online character builder tool.

=== 5th edition ===
In the 5th Edition Dungeon Master's Guide (2014), Vecna appears as a member of the "Dawn War Pantheon" which is mostly derived from the 4th Edition pantheon. He is also included in the Player's Handbook (2014) as one of the deities of Greyhawk. In both, he is listed as the god of evil secrets. Additionally, both his hand and eye are listed as artifacts. In the Sword Coast Adventurer's Guide (2015), Vecna is mentioned as a possible God for the Arcana Cleric Domain, as well as a Warlock patron of the Undying.

In the Exandria setting, Vecna is a Betrayer God also known as the Whispered One. He was introduced to this setting in the Dungeons & Dragons web series Critical Role as the main villain in the last arc of the first campaign. However, the events of Critical Role were not added to the official Dungeons & Dragons canon until Joe Manganiello's character Arkhan was added to the adventure module Baldur's Gate: Descent Into Avernus (2019). Further details on Vox Machina's fight with Vecna were then included in the official campaign sourcebook Explorer's Guide to Wildemount (2020) along with details on Vecna's enemies and his commandments.

In June 2022, Wizards of the Coast released the Vecna Dossier as a digital exclusive on D&D Beyond. This included background information and a 5th Edition statblock for Vecna in the updated style of the edition. This iteration is of Vecna as an archlich before his ascension to godhood.

Vecna is the main villain of the adventure module Vecna: Eve of Ruin, released in May 2024. This module also launches a new storyline that will "play out over a five year period, with other adventures bringing back more classic D&D villains".

== Related artifacts ==
The Hand and Eye of Vecna, as shown on the cover of Vecna Lives! (TSR, 1990)

=== Hand and Eye of Vecna ===
The left hand and eye of Vecna's original "mortal" lich form, which have never been replaced in his later more powerful incarnations, are now high-valued and very dangerous magical artifacts. To use the powers of the Hand of Vecna or the Eye of Vecna one is required to cut off one's own corresponding body part and affix Vecna's in its place. "The new bearer of the Eye or Hand (or both) will gain access to powerful spell-like abilities, but the items will slowly corrupt them, turning them evil over time". These artifacts were introduced in the third supplement to the original D&D rules, Eldritch Wizardry. They went on to appear in all subsequent D&D editions. They are considered classic items in D&D, with Mordicai Knode of Tor.com commenting "We all agree that the Hand and Eye of Vecna are the best artifacts, right?" Scott Baird, for Screen Rant, highlighted the risk of the items and stated that "a D&D party that finds one can find itself torn apart. The reputation of these items precedes them and many good adventurers would want to destroy the Eye or Hand of Vecna, but there is always the temptation of power. More importantly, the player will be tempted, simply so they can brag that they used these famous items in a campaign".

Joe Manganiello's character Arkhan fought against Vecna with the adventuring party Vox Machina in the web series Critical Role. He then stole the Hand of Vecna and replaced his own hand with the artifact. In Baldur's Gate: Descent Into Avernus (2019), Arkhan is attempting to master the Hand of Vecna in hopes of freeing Tiamat, however, the artifact is slowly corrupting and decomposing his left side.

=== Sword of Kas ===
Vecna created the Sword of Kas for his greatest servant Kas the Bloody-Handed and it contains a "portion of his consciousness."

This interpretation is relatively recent. As per the 1st edition Dungeon Master's Guide, Vecna only procured this most powerful sword for his chief lieutenant. Similarly, depending on edition and source, its appearance has varied, from a short sword to a wavy bladed two hander. However, it is consistently depicted that the Sword is inextricably tied to Vecna's relics. "The reason why Vecna only has a single eye and hand is due to a betrayal by Kas", who used the sword against his former master.

"In the third edition of Dungeons & Dragons, the Sword of Kas is a +6 unholy keen vorpal longsword that grants a +10 modifier to the Strength score of its wielder".

The sword is listed as an artifact in the 2024 Dungeon Master's Guide.

=== Other artifacts ===
A number of Vecna's other body parts are presented as minor artifacts in Die Vecna Die!, including the First Digit (right thumb), Second Digit (right index finger), Third Digit (right middle finger), Last Digit (right pinky finger), Incisors (a pair of inappropriately named fang-like canines), Molar, Scalp, Skin, Heart, Foot (left), and Right Eye. These artifacts are collectively known in D&D 3rd Edition as the Fragments of Vecna. The Compendium Maleficarum is a book of spells, doctrines, and secrets crafted entirely from bone (even the pages) and penned in blood, that is on par with the Fragments of Vecna. The Tome of Shared Secrets is an illustrated bestiary of relic status, with the ability to impart knowledge of dark and evil creatures at the cost of a portion the user's life force. Those two books were superseded in 5th edition by a combined Book of Vile Darkness, a legacy of dark secrets started by Vecna. The Rod of the Whispered One, while not nearly so powerful as the Sword of Kas, is another item Vecna crafted to connect himself with his highest lieutenants. The final issue of Dragon Magazine, issue #359, featured rules for the "Left Ear of Vecna" as a minor artifact. It grants the owner magical bonuses to hearing and resisting sonic attacks, spell-like abilities to inflict deafness, grant clairaudience and create sonic blasts, and enables them to understand any spoken language. A lich known as Osterneth possesses the "Heart of Vecna" according to the Open Grave sourcebook.

=== Head of Vecna ===
The Head of Vecna was a hoax that one adventuring party played on another in a campaign run by game master Mark Steuer. One of the groups tricked the other into going on a quest for the Head of Vecna, a hoax artifact that was supposedly similar to his Hand and Eye, but was simply an ordinary severed head. The hoax takes advantage of the fact that the Eye and Hand require a person to remove their own eye or hand and replace it with the artifact to function. The characters involved in the story reasoned that they needed to decapitate themselves to gain the powers of the Head of Vecna, and several members of the group actually fought over which character would get to have his head cut off and replaced. After the third character died, the joke was revealed.

In the 1999 Dungeons & Dragons role-playing video game Planescape: Torment, Fall-From-Grace (a celibate succubus) asks Morte (a disembodied floating skull) "What are you?", to which Morte replies "Me? I'm the head of Vecna." A similar conversation between the two involves Morte saying "It's a long story involving the head of Vecna. I don't want to talk about it." Grace responds with an amused "That was you?" Also in the same game, the Eye of Vecna is a rare item dropped by a greater glabrezu.

The Head of Vecna made a canonical appearance in the AD&D 2nd edition module Die Vecna Die! (2000), and was the subject of a short adventure on the Wizards of the Coast website in 2007.

Familiarity with the Head of Vecna was cited as an example characteristic of an avid role-playing gamer by writer David M. Ewalt.

== Fictional history ==
=== Description ===
Vecna is usually depicted as a powerful magician resembling a desiccated corpse missing his left hand and eye. A constant theme in the adventures in which the character appears is Vecna's never-ending quest for power, ending, should he succeed, with Vecna as the only deity in existence.

=== Character biography ===
Vecna was born as a human, centuries ago as a member of the untouchable caste in the Flan city of Fleeth on Oerth. He was initially trained by his mother, Mazzel, in the art of magic, before she was executed by the government of Fleeth for practicing witchcraft. Vowing revenge, Vecna eventually assumed a mastery of the dark arts achieved by no mortal before or since. Some say this achievement was due to direct tutelage by Mok'slyk the Serpent, believed to be the personification of arcane magic itself.

Nearly one thousand years after his birth, Vecna, now a lich and ruler of a great and terrible empire (in the Sheldomar Valley, centered near the modern-day Rushmoors), laid siege to the city of Fleeth with an army of arcane spellcasters and undead. Legend has it that Vecna was nearly slain in this battle by clerics channeling the power of Pholtus, the god of light. The clerics unleashed a great burst of light, which hit Vecna primarily on his left side. Vecna was rescued and brought to safety by one of his wizard generals, a cambion named Acererak (who would one day himself become a mighty demilich).

Vecna eventually recovered. On the verge of conquering Fleeth, the officials of the city came before him to beg for mercy. They offered up the entire city and her wealth if only Vecna would spare the lives of her citizens. When Vecna was not satisfied, the officials offered their own lives. Vecna gave one of their number, Artau, and his family, over to his lieutenant, Kas, who spent the entire day torturing and murdering them before the other officials. Still unsatisfied, Vecna slaughtered all within the city, and had their heads stacked before the officials, with those of their family members prominent. Vecna then granted his mercy, granting the officials leave to depart, and promising them his protection for the rest of their lives.

At his empire's height, Vecna was betrayed and destroyed by his most trusted lieutenant, a vampire called Kas the Bloody-Handed, using a magical sword that Vecna himself had crafted for him, now known as the Sword of Kas. Only his left hand and his eye survived the battle, perhaps because of the previous events in Fleeth.

Vecna did not stay gone forever, and rose as a demigod of magic and secrets in the world of Greyhawk. In 581 CY, his cult helped set events in motion that would have granted him the power of a greater god, but the plan was ultimately foiled. After these events, Vecna ended up imprisoned in the demiplane of Ravenloft, but broke free again later, emerging with the power of a greater god, after absorbing the power of Iuz. He then broke free into the city of Sigil, where he came perilously close to rearranging all existence to his whims. (Vecna's multiverse shattering campaign in Sigil is used as an in-universe way to explain the differences between the 2nd and 3rd editions of Dungeons & Dragons.) When Vecna was ejected from Sigil by a party of adventurers, Iuz was freed and Vecna returned to Oerth greatly reduced in power, though still a lesser god.

In the events of the Living Greyhawk campaign setting, Vecna's machinations allowed him to reappear on the prime material plane and retake his place in the Oerth pantheon.

=== Writings ===
At some point in his history, Vecna penned a tome known as Ordinary Necromancy. He is also rumored to have made significant additions to the Book of Vile Darkness.

== Fictional relationships ==
Vecna has few allies, and countless enemies. In 2nd and 3rd Edition, his greatest, and perhaps only true ally is the mysterious entity known as the Serpent. In 4th edition, the Open Grave book introduces Osterneth, the Bronze Lich, as the mightiest servant of Vecna. The famed cambion lich, Acererak, once served Vecna, but the current status of their relationship is unknown. Among Vecna's staunchest foes are Kas, Iuz, Saint Cuthbert, the Lady of Pain, Pholtus, and the Circle of Eight. He is also opposed by the Old Faith and the Silent Ones.

In 4th edition, Vecna's main foes in the realm of death and undeath are Kas, Orcus and the Raven Queen (though he would rather she rule the dead than Orcus). Among the gods, Ioun is something of Vecna's antithesis, for she would share with the world all the knowledge he would keep secret.

=== Worshippers ===
Vecna's cult is very secretive, and cells have been uncovered, at various points in history, in Diamond Lake, Greyhawk, and Verbobonc. Temples to Vecna have also been reported in the Pomarj town of Highport and Erelhei-Cinlu, the debased city at the heart of the Vault of the Drow.

==== Scriptures ====
Being a secretive cult, there are no real collections of Vecnan teachings. However, copies of the Book of Vile Darkness are highly prized by the cult for Vecna's role in that work's development. The Open Grave book offers the "Scroll of Mauthereign", which offers a twisted version of Vecna's history and tells his followers that committing evil acts is holy and righteous.

Although not actually penned by Vecna, the Book of Keeping (a book of Yugoloth summoning) is heavily linked with the cult of Vecna, as the cultists have the only known copies that are free of the intentional errors introduced into the book by the fiends that wrote the volume as a trap for would-be summoners.

==== Hierarchy ====
Each position in Vecna's cult is named for a certain body part. At the top is Vecna himself, followed by the Voice of Vecna, which can only be filled by Vecna's manifestation.

Next is the Heart of Vecna, the high priest of the cult. The last known Heart of Vecna was Diraq Malcinex of Ket, who was slain by adventurers in 581 CY.

Immediately below the Heart of Vecna are two bizarre monsters known as the Hand and the Eye. The Eye of Vecna creature appears as a slender humanoid with an eyeball for a head, whereas the Hand of Vecna appears as a stocky humanoid with a huge left hand where its head should be.

Individual congregations are known as organs. Each organ is led by a Thought of Vecna. Lesser priests are known as Memories of Vecna.

Lay members of the cult consist of the Teeth, Fingers, Blood, and Spawn of Vecna. The Teeth of Vecna are made up of wizards, and specialize in arcane spellcasting and crafting magical items for the cult. The Fingers of Vecna consist mainly of thieves, who engage in various forms of subterfuge. The Blood of Vecna are mainly warriors charged with protection and enforcement of the cult and its goals. The Spawn of Vecna are the lowest in the cult hierarchy, and consist of the common people who honor the Lich Lord.

In 4th edition, the Open Grave book shows the leader of the cult of Vecna is a lich named Mauthereign. Even when Osterneth, the Bronze Lich, is Vecna's mightiest servant, her position is not revealed among his files.

==== Other Vecnan organizations ====
Other Vecnan organizations are known to exist outside of the mainstream cult, and some may have similar or identical names. Relations between these groups and the mainstream cult may vary. Known examples are the Eyes of Vecna (a cult of undeath consisting mainly of rogues), the Fingers of Vecna (Vecna's personal guard), and the Ebon Triad (a heretical cult seeking to merge Vecna, Hextor, and Erythnul into a single entity).

In 4th edition, a secret group known as the Keepers of the Forbidden Lore is devoted to Vecna. Unlike most Vecna worshippers, the Keepers reject most of the nasty and evil rituals and beliefs associated with the god; they worship him as the God of Secrets, and believe that there is some knowledge too evil for the world to know. They instead hunt down secrets and information they deem to be too dangerous for the world at large and keep it secret in the name of Vecna. This puts them in opposition to mainstream followers of Vecna who regard the Keepers as heretics, and makes them enemies of Ioun and her followers, who believe all knowledge should be available for everybody and the moral obligations on how to use it rest on the shoulders of the individuals involved.

== Reception ==
In 2013, Alex Lucard, for Diehard GameFAN, highlighted the use of Vecna in two 2nd edition modules: Vecna Lives (1991) and Die Vecna, Die (2000). On the second module, Lucard wrote, "I love Vecna and I love Greyhawk. [...] Players will encounter some of the most iconic and evil characters in all of Dungeons & Dragons, and have to witness firsthand the end of the Second Edition Universe, and the beginning of Third Edition".

Vecna was #2 on Screen Rant's 2018 "Dungeons & Dragons: The 15 Most Powerful Villains, Ranked" list — the article highlights the Vecna Lives (1991) module and states "the players are given the chance to control the members of the Circle of Eight as they investigate a strange burial mound in the Kron Hills. The players then have to watch in horror as the high-level wizards that they are controlling are brutally dealt with [...]. The players then wake up and realize that they have to succeed where some of the most powerful wizards in the world failed. Vecna Lives concludes with the players facing off against an avatar of Vecna".

In 2019, Jeremy Thomas, for 411Mania, wrote "Vecna is one of D&D’s most well-known villainous characters. While his story has evolved slightly over the years, he has always been a powerful undead lich. The original appearance of the Eye and Hand of Vecna was in 1976’s Eldritch Wizardry and it was said that Vecna was long-since destroyed. He eventually became an antagonist in the world of Greyhawk, reimagined as a lich who attained demigod status. His hand and eye, which were separated from him, are able to be applied to characters to grant great powers at an equally great cost".

Vecna was #4 on CBR's 2020 "10 Unique (& Powerful) Villains To Spice Up A High Level Dungeons & Dragons Campaign" list — the article states that "Once a humble necromancer, he rose all the way to becoming a lich and finally a god through an act of ascension. Resplendent with evil this figure is a god whose domain encompasses the undead and secrets. This villain is the apex of the living dead. A campaign centered around fighting the undead in any established D&D setting could use him as the big bad at the end. He currently doesn't have a stat block in 5e but some homebrew stats exist for him".

Vecna was #4 on Game Rant's 2020 "10 Must-Have NPCs In Dungeons & Dragons Lore To Make Your Campaigns Awesome" list — the article states that "Aside from being a deity himself, Vecna can take on the role of an Undying Patron for Warlocks. Campaigns with a focus on gods, the divine, and the infernal may benefit from having Vecna. Vecna's cunning means he'll likely have a scheme to achieve domination over whatever pantheon he becomes a part of."

== In other media ==
- In Slash'EM, the Hand of Vecna is a very useful artifact, gained after killing Vecna himself in the Chaotic Quest.
- WizKids, a Wizards of the Coast licensee, released a home display version of the Hand and Eye of Vecna in January 2021 as part of their D&D Icons of the Realms series. In 2022, they released a collectable resin statue of Vecna which includes the Book of Vile Darkness under his ribcage.
- In the Magic: The Gathering expansion set Adventures in the Forgotten Realms (2021), a player can sacrifice three cards (The Book of Vile Darkness, Eye of Vecna, and Hand of Vecna) to summon Vecna as an "indestructible token" with all of the features of those three cards.
- In The Legend of Vox Machina (2022), an adaptation of Critical Role's first campaign, multiple references are made to The Whispered One, whom the Briarwoods attempt to summon during the first season. Popverse noted that the name "Vecna" is owned by Wizards of the Coast and this adaptation has not licensed use of the name so the character is instead referred to as "The Whispered One". In the fourth season, he is voiced by Andy Serkis.
- In Stranger Things, a character nicknamed Vecna, whose real name is Henry Creel, is the main antagonist in the fourth (2022) and fifth (2025) seasons. Like the Demogorgon and Mind Flayer, Vecna is not based on the D&D character, but the main characters in the series name him based on some similarities, such as being a powerful "wizard" who was transformed into a monster, and having an extremely powerful left hand.
- In RuneScape, the Vecna skull is a very rare item, obtained from the Rare Drop Table. It can be activated to provide the player with a boost to their magic level.
- In the video game Dead by Daylight, Vecna – known as "The Lich" who wields the Book of Vile Darkness – appears as the "playable killer" in the licensed Dungeons & Dragons DLC (2024). He is voiced by Matthew Mercer. Players have a chance to equip either the Hand or Eye of Vecna as they face off against him. The Stranger Things iteration of Vecna also appears as a "playable killer" in 2026.
- In the Web Series Death Battle. Vecna will face Doctor Doom from Marvel Comics as the finale to their 2026 Season.
