= Living Greyhawk Gazetteer =

2000 Dungeons & Dragons sourcebook

- Author: Gary Holian, Erik Mona, Sean K Reynolds, Frederick Weining
- Cover artist: William O'Connor
- Language: English
- Series: Greyhawk
- Genre: Dungeons & Dragons
- Publisher: Wizards of the Coast
- Publication date: November 2000
- Publication place: United States
- Media type: Trade Paperback
- Pages: 192
- ISBN: 0-7869-1743-1
- OCLC: 51449446

The Living Greyhawk Gazetteer (LGG) is a sourcebook for the World of Greyhawk campaign setting for the 3rd edition of the Dungeons & Dragons roleplaying game. Despite the title, the Living Greyhawk Gazetteer is not exclusive to the Living Greyhawk Campaign. Other publications linked to the Living Greyhawk Gazetteer have treated it as superior to the D&D Gazetteer and used it in the D&D Gazetteer's place.

== Contents ==
The Living Greyhawk Gazetteer expands upon material covered by previous products, such as Gary Gygax's World of Greyhawk Fantasy Game Setting and Carl Sargent's From the Ashes (TSR, 1993).

== Publication history ==
The Living Greyhawk Gazetteer was published in November 2000. It was written by Gary Holian, Erik Mona, Sean K Reynolds, and Frederick Weining, and featuring a cover by William O'Connor. Interior art was by Joel Biske, Vince Locke, and Daniela Castillo.

== Critical response ==
Of the two Greyhawk Gazetteers (The Living Greyhawk Gazetteer and the D&D Gazetteer) published for the 3rd Edition Dungeons and Dragons game, the Living Greyhawk Gazetteer was better received by players. Most reviews were generally positive, while common misgivings concerned the lack of a full-color layout and the paper-back cover.

== Reviews ==
- Dragão Brasil

== See also ==
- Living Greyhawk
- Greyhawk Adventures
- Greyhawk: The Adventure Begins
