= Night Below =

1995 role-playing game supplement

Night Below: An Underdark Campaign
- Author: Carl Sargent
- Genre: Role-playing game
- Publisher: TSR
- Publication date: 1995
- Media type: Boxed set

Night Below: An Underdark Campaign, often known as Night Below, is a boxed set for the second edition of the Advanced Dungeons & Dragons fantasy role-playing game. The set, with the product code TSR 1125, was published in 1995, and was written by Carl Sargent, with box cover art by Jeff Easley.

== Contents ==
Night Below is a boxed set that includes three 64-page books ("Book I: The Evils of Haranshire", "Book II: Perils of the Underdark", and "Book III: The Sunless Sea"), 26 photocopyable player handouts on 16 sheets, an eight-page Monstrous Compendium supplement, eight referee reference cards, three double-sided full-color maps with tactical maps on the reverse suitable for use with miniatures.

Night Below is an adventure for four to eight first-level characters that will allow them to reach 14th level by the conclusion. The adventure breaks down into three parts (each with its own beginning, middle, and ending), each contained within its own booklet and fold-out, double-sided color map, with tactical maps for miniatures. The adventure begins with the player characters acting as couriers for a wizard, when they are waylaid by band of brigands trying to capture the party's spellcasters. Play is initially conducted aboveground in a rural setting, which provides many small-scale encounters from which characters can gain experience, treasure, and clues. There is a village that characters can use as a base, with its own supporting cast of Non-player characters for potential friends, including rangers, a druid, and a wizard. The players then unearth the entrance to a vast cave system, where they will contend with the sinister plot hatching far below.

The adventure recommends that the Dungeon Master reward the characters with experience points for accumulating the powerful magic items that they find. In case characters don't advance in level quickly enough, hooks and suggestions for mini-adventures both above and below ground are provided.

The set consists of three 64-page booklets detailing the epic dungeon-based campaign (all three with cover art by Easley; book 3 having the same cover art as the box itself), 6 large color fold-out poster maps, an 8-page booklet of monster statistics pages, 8 reference cards for the Dungeon Master, and sixteen sheets containing player handouts.

Book I: The Evils of Haranshire provides an introduction to Night Below, a campaign designed to take player characters from starting at 1st level to 10th level and beyond. This campaign was expressly designed to be usable into any ongoing campaign setting. This booklet details Haranshire, where the adventure begins, and the non-player characters which may be encountered there.

Book II: Perils of the Underdark details the catacomb and cavern complexes of the Underdark here. This book introduces many encounters with underground races, such as the derro, svirfneblin, illithids, and rockseer elves. This portion of the adventure emphasizes role-playing, intrigue, and diplomacy rather than just combat.

Book III: The Sunless Sea describes the aboleth city of Great Shaboath and leads up to the final confrontation against the aboleth, who are the masterminds behind the scenario.

Three of the six mapsheets provide smaller maps detailing various sites for encounters, while the other three mapsheets are large-scale tactical maps designed to be used in miniatures combat.

The monster booklet details 5 monsters in the Monstrous Compendium style: savant aboleth, rockseer elf, ixzan ixitxachitl, giant moray eel, and Shaboath golem.

The Dungeon Master's reference cards include maps of the villages of Milborne and Thurmaster, a listing of underground terrain hazards, monster rosters, descriptions of aboleth and ixitxachitl deities, and monster cutouts for miniatures combat.

The sixteen loose sheets contain 26 handouts to be given to players at suitable times in the campaign, and include items such as journal entries, sketch maps, runes and symbols, and clues.

== Publication history ==
Night Below was written by Carl Sargent and published by TSR as a boxed set in 1995. Cover art was by Jeff Easley, with interior art by Arnie Swekel and Glen Michael Angus.

== Reception ==
Cliff Ramshaw reviewed Night Below for Arcane magazine, rating it a 9 out of 10 overall. According to Ramshaw, after the adventure's simple start, "Nobody could guess at the gobsmackingly malignant creatures behind this plot, or at the sheer scale of the quest on which the adventurers must embark." He notes that the adventure is billed as "the ultimate dungeon adventure", and that it "will fit snugly into just about any campaign world". He called the set up in the village "hardly original", but felt that the NPCs were "drawn with sufficient personality to provide some measure of roleplaying interaction without interfering with the plot". He commented that the adventure is not about originality, but that it is "about hacking, and, indeed, slashing, and that's what you get in spades". He described the dungeon as "bursting at the seams with nasty, slimy, ugly things that [...] come in all shapes and sizes, with all manner of powers and special abilities that should provide players with a wide variety of challenges". He acknowledged that not everyone would enjoy the "unremitting mayhem" of this combat-oriented adventure, and noted that "although alliances can and should be formed with some of the Underdark's inhabitants, the majority are implacably hostile". He also noted: "There are tricks and traps, of course, but not so many that the majority of the party is constantly left twiddling its thumbs while the thief goes to work. The emphasis here is firmly on adventure, not puzzle solving." Ramshaw noted that while many referees ignore the rule about awarding experience for magic items found, he felt that referees would be well advised to implement it with this adventure "given the need to for characters to advance in levels sufficiently to be able to handle the following stages". He suggested that making use of the hooks and suggestions for mini-adventures is a good idea, because "there are hundreds of hours of play here, and players are bound to want a break from the Night Below quest sooner or later". Another potential problem with the adventure he noted was that "there are so many spell-using foes and so many potential allies for the players that keeping it all together could give the referee a bit of a headache". Ramshaw concluded by saying, "Night Below won't be to some peoples' taste, but the vast majority will absolutely adore it. Quite simply, it's one hell of an adventure."
