= List of The Legend of Vox Machina characters =

The main characters of the series with character design by Phil Bourassa. Left to right: Percy, Pike, Grog, Scanlan, Keyleth, Vax and Vex.

The Legend of Vox Machina is an adult animated fantasy television series based on campaign one of the web series Critical Role. The series mainly follows the titular Vox Machina, a party of adventurers known primarily for their exploits across the continent of Tal'Dorei.

The cast reprising their roles from the web series are Laura Bailey, Taliesin Jaffe, Ashley Johnson, Liam O'Brien, Marisha Ray, Sam Riegel and Travis Willingham. Matthew Mercer, the Dungeon Master of the campaign, also stars as Trinket, Lord Sylas Briarwood, Umbrasyl and voices a number of background characters. Mary Elizabeth McGlynn is voice director for seasons 1 and 2.

The series premiered on Amazon Prime Video on January 28, 2022; the second season premiered on January 20, 2023. Season 3 premiered on October 17, 2024. Season 4 premiered on June 3, 2026.

== Overview ==
List indicators
= Main cast (credited)
= Recurring cast (3+ episodes in season)
= Guest cast (1-2 episodes in season)

Character	Portrayed by	Appearances			
Character	Portrayed by	Season 1	Season 2	Season 3	Season 4
Main characters
Vex'ahlia "Vex" Vessar	Laura Bailey	Main	Main	Main	Main
Percival "Percy" Fredrickstein Von Musel Klossowski de Rolo III	Taliesin Jaffe	Main (Note: In season 3, Jaffe is a member of the main cast and is credited in every episode, but not always as Percy.)	Main	Main	Main
Pike Trickfoot	Ashley Johnson	Main	Main	Main	Main
Trinket	Matthew Mercer (Note: Mercer is a member of the main cast and is credited in every episode, but not always as Trinket. He also voices several other recurring characters in the series, as well as background characters in most episodes, but Trinket is the character with the most appearances.) (Note: Trinket is also voiced by Cheech Marin in a hallucination in season 2.)	Main	Main	Main	Main
Vax'ildan "Vax" Vessar	Liam O'Brien	Main	Main	Main	Main
Keyleth of the Air Ashari	Marisha Ray	Main	Main	Main	Main
Scanlan Shorthalt	Sam Riegel (Note: In season 4, Riegel is a member of the main cast and is credited in every episode, but only once as Scanlan, credited as background characters in most episodes.)	Main	Main	Main	Main
Grog Strongjaw	Travis Willingham	Main	Main	Main	Main
Recurring characters
Lady Kima of Vord	Stephanie Beatriz	Recurring	Recurring	Recurring	Guest
Sovereign Uriel Tal'Dorei	Khary Payton	Recurring	Guest		
Lady Allura Vysoren	Indira Varma	Recurring	Recurring	Recurring	Guest
Lord Sylas Briarwood	Matthew Mercer	Recurring			Guest
Lady Delilah Briarwood	Grey Griffin	Recurring			Recurring
Shaun Gilmore	Sunil Malhotra	Recurring	Recurring	Recurring	Guest
Kerrion Stonefell	Darin De Paul	Recurring			
Head Cleric (Note: In season 4, the character is credited as Priestess)	Anjali Bhimani	Recurring			Recurring
Professor Anders	Stephen Root	Recurring			
Archibald Desnay	Dominic Monaghan	Recurring			
Duke Vedmire	Rory McCann	Recurring			
Keeper Yennen	Gina Torres	Recurring	Recurring	Recurring	
Lord de Rolo	Taliesin Jaffe	Recurring			
Cassandra de Rolo	Esmé Creed-Miles	Recurring	Recurring	Recurring	Guest
Dr. Anna Ripley	Kelly Hu (Note: A young Anna Ripley is voiced by Kimiko Glenn in season 3.)	Recurring	Recurring	Recurring	
Thordak	Lance Reddick		Recurring (Note: Levar Burton voiced undead Thordak in the last two episodes of season 3.)	Recurring	
Umbrasyl	Matthew Mercer		Recurring		
Raishan	Cree Summer	Guest (Note: Credited as "Otherworldly Voice" in the first season.)	Recurring	Recurring	
Craven Edge	Matthew Mercer		Recurring		
Kashaw	Will Friedle		Recurring	Guest	
Zahra	Mary Elizabeth McGlynn		Recurring	Guest	Guest
Zanror	Abubakar Salim		Recurring		
Kevdak	Ralph Ineson		Recurring		
Kaylie	Aisling Franciosi		Recurring	Recurring	Guest
Orthax	Matthew Mercer	Guest		Recurring	
Vorugal	Liam O'Brien		Guest	Recurring	
Earthbreaker Groon	Ike Amadi		Guest	Recurring	
Zerxus Ilerez	Luis Carazo			Recurring	
Taryon "Tary" Darrington	Wayne Brady				Recurring
Doty	"Himself" (Note: Doty is credited as "Himself" for all appearances. This required special permission from SAG-AFTRA.)				Recurring
Death Knight	Sam Riegel				Recurring
Beastmaster	Chris Prynoski				Recurring
Gideon / The Whispered One	Andy Serkis				Recurring
Dark Bard	Tom Cardy				Recurring
Guest characters (Note: For the sake of brevity, only characters who have appeared in multiple seasons are listed here.)
Jarrett Howarth	Eugene Byrd	Guest	Guest	Guest	Guest
The Everlight	Tracie Thoms	Guest		Guest	
Syldor Vessar	Troy Baker		Guest	Guest	
Vilya	Janet Varney		Guest	Guest	
Korrin	Fred Tatasciore		Guest	Guest	Guest
Cerkonos	Robbie Daymond		Guest	Guest	Guest
Dr. Dranzel	Matthew Mercer		Guest	Guest	Guest
Wilhand Trickfoot	Henry Winkler		Guest		Guest
Matron of Ravens	Courtenay Taylor		Guest	Guest	Guest
Pa'tice	Debra Wilson			Guest	Guest
Uvenda	Tamara Podemski			Guest	Guest

== Vox Machina ==
The characters have been adapted from campaign one of the web series Critical Role.

=== Vex'ahlia de Rolo ===
Vex'ahlia "Vex" de Rolo, née Vessar (voiced by Laura Bailey), is a half-elf ranger and the twin sister of Vax'ildan. She studied dragons in the hope of eventually finding the one that killed her and Vax's mother when they were children. Vex feels a shooting pain in her head whenever a dragon is close by. She is accompanied by Trinket (voiced by Matthew Mercer; Cheech Marin in Keyleth's Fey Realm hallucination), an armored bear companion she found as a cub and raised. Vex and her brother were treated poorly by her elven father Syldor due to her mixed heritage and Vax pushes her to run away with him following years of mistreatment by Syldor. This act brings the twins closer than ever before, having only the other the rely upon. Once returning to Syngorn as an adult, Syldor continues to dismiss both the twin's accomplishments and their quest for Fenthras, a Vestige of Divergence and Vex "defers to his anger" and even chides Vax when he attempts to rebuke him". In an attempt to stand up for Vex, Percy informs Syldor that Vex is in fact titled as Lady Vex'ahlia, Baroness of the Third House of Whitestone and Grand Mistress of the Gray Hunt, which Syldor also dismisses, even though Percy does legitimize this title later. This prompts Vex to stand up for her friends and herself – when Syldor smugly rebukes her, she continues. 'We won't fail, which is more than I can say about you as a father.'" After recovering and claiming Fenthras, Vex decides she's not ready to face her father again. In season 3, Vex and Percy admit their feelings for one another, and after a few trysts together, decide to not pursue a romantic relationship at Vex's insistence, but stay as "teammates with benefits". This, obviously, does not work out. Percy and Vex later marry in secret.

=== Percival de Rolo ===
Percival "Percy" Fredrickstein Von Musel Klossowski de Rolo III, Third Son of the House of Whitestone (voiced by Taliesin Jaffe) is a human gunslinger. Percival hails from the noble de Rolo family, rulers of Whitestone, until his family was massacred by the Briarwoods, a vampiric couple who usurped control of the city. Percy barely escaped with his life, but the trauma of his family's death left him vengeful and haunted.

Driven by a desire for revenge, Percy uses his intellect to create firearms, becoming a skilled marksman and inventor, effectively inventing the first gun created in Exandria. His personal quest to reclaim Whitestone and destroy the Briarwoods becomes a major arc in the series. Along the way, Percy struggles with a dark force tied to his thirst for vengeance, manifesting in a demon called Orthax, who offers him power in exchange for his soul.

As Percy confronts his past and seeks justice for his family, he must also grapple with the consequences of his actions and the darkness within himself. He is the husband of Vex’ahlia.

=== Pike Trickfoot ===
Pike Trickfoot (voiced by Ashley Johnson) is a gnome cleric of the goddess Everlight. She's been a companion of Grog's for many years, and the two have a deep, caring friendship. Pike's faith sometimes gets challenged by what she feels she has to do to help her teammates and friends. In season 3, Pike obtains the Plate of the Dawnmartyr, a special magical armor that can turn a dragon's fire attack back against them.

=== Vax'ildan Vessar ===
Vax'ildan "Vax" Vessar (voiced by Liam O'Brien) is a rogue and is the twin brother of Vex'ahlia, and their close bond is central to their characters. After their mother's death at the hands of a dragon, Vax and Vex became inseparable, relying on each other as they navigated a dangerous world.

In the series, Vax is depicted as the group's agile scout, skilled in stealth and subterfuge. His quick thinking and ability to outmaneuver enemies often help the team out of perilous situations. Vax struggles with feelings of vulnerability and a deep fear of losing his loved ones, which motivates his fierce protectiveness toward Vex and the rest of the group.

A major turning point for Vax's character comes when he encounters the Matron of Ravens, the goddess of death. After a fateful encounter, Vax becomes her chosen champion, which grants him supernatural abilities but also binds him to her service. This connection to the Matron of Death introduces a darker, more introspective side to Vax, as he grapples with the weight of his new responsibilities and his role in guiding souls to the afterlife.

Vax is a romantic interest to Keyleth, and while he shares the same feelings, some of the effects of his new powers, including his ability to see the future fates of others, causes him to not act on his feelings for Keyleth.

=== Keyleth of the Air Ashari ===
Keyleth of the Air Ashari (voiced by Marisha Ray) is a half-elf druid who is currently undergoing her Aramenté – a quest which acts as the Ashari trial of leadership. Keyleth, or "Keykey" as she's sometimes called, is initially apprehensive and doubting of her abilities, but slowly gains confidence throughout the series' first two seasons. As of season 3, she can control wind, fire, and plant attacks. Keyleth has feelings for Vax, which he also has for her but doesn't want to pursue them, as Vax worries that his own powers and visions could pull them away.

=== Scanlan Shorthalt ===
Scanlan Shorthalt (voiced by Sam Riegel) is a gnome bard known for his music and innuendo. He is not shy about his promiscuity. Scanlan is able to use his lyre to cast different spells. Scanlan has an illegitimate daughter, Kaylie, who was born out of a one-night-stand Scanlan had with her mother. Scanlan tries to reconnect with her but fails when he is torn between patching things up with her and helping his team out. Scanlan also seems to have feelings for Pike, in spite of his promiscuous attitude, though she only seems to care for him as a friend and teammate.

=== Grog Strongjaw ===
Grog Strongjaw (voiced by Travis Willingham) is a goliath barbarian, who is always ready to fight. Grog and Pike have been friends for many years, with Grog usually needing Pike to keep him focused. Simple-minded, Grog can sometimes take things too literally or not literally enough. Initially bare-faced, Grog grows a beard in season 2.

=== Taryon Darrington ===
Taryon Darrington (voiced by Wayne Brady) is a human adventurer, who is accompanied by a robot companion Doty (voiced by "Himself"), who writes down his adventures. He seems useless at first, but then shows his worth and skills.

== Other characters by fictional location ==
=== Ank'Harel ===
Ank'Harel is a desert city in Marquet, a continent of Exanndria.

- J'mon Sa Ord (Mara Junot): The ruler of Ank'Harel, who turns those who are found guilty of crimes into golems. They later help Vox Machina locate the Plate of the Dawnmartyr in their battle against the Chroma Conclave.

=== Deastok ===
Deastok is a city in Wildemount.

- Howaardt Darrington (Kevin Michael Richardson): Taryon's father. He finds his son to be a disappointment, and sent him away on a mission he assumed he'd fail. His is a baron, a collector of antiquities, and owns the Darrington family's jewel mines, which provided the Children of Truth with the shattergems for their wands.
- Cleeves (Mercer): Howaardt's faithful goliath butler. He wears a Doty-style battle suit when in battle.

=== Dis ===
Dis is a city in the Hell of Despath.

- Zerxus Ilerez (Luis Carazo (Note: Reprises the role from the Critical Role webseries.)): An antiquities collector who was a knight, during a time before the Calamity. He challenges Pike to a card game, for the Plate of the Dawnmartyr, winning the first round, but lost the second. Though he accepts his defeat, he sends his demon servant after Vox Machina to kill them, except for Pike.

=== Draconia ===
Draconia is a city of dragon-born in Wildemount.

- Dohla (Rachel House): A dragonborn sorceress who was part of Kima and Allura's party, and there when they sealed Thordak away. She felt cheated out of the glory of defeating Thordak, and thus betrayed her former party members, by giving them to Vorugal. She is then eaten alive by the dragon after telling him what to do.

=== Emon ===
Emon is the capital of the Kingdom of Tal'Dorei and is located on the continent's western shore. The city is attacked by the dragons of the Chroma Conclave at the end of the first season.

- Sovereign Uriel Tal'Dorei (Khary Payton): the ruler of the kingdom of Tal'Dorei. Sovereign Uriel entrusts the task of hunting down an unidentified beast burning the farmlands to Vox Machina because he is impressed with Vex's bear, Trinket. Following Vox Machina's defeat of the Briarwoods, he renounces his throne and cedes the government to the Tal'Dorei Council due to his failure in leadership. This proclamation in the Cloudtop District is interrupted by an attack from multiple chromatic dragons. He is killed by Raishan's toxic breath during the attack.
- Sir Fince (Tony Hale): an elf member of the Tal'Dorei Council who doesn't quite believe in Vox Machina and their skills. Vox Machina suspect that he is secretly working for the dragon attacking the farmlands and stealthily follow Fince to General Krieg's mansion. However, when they confront him within the mansion, Fince is killed by Krieg.
- General Krieg (David Tennant): a member of the Tal'Dorei Council who leads the military, and is secretly the evil blue dragon Brimscythe. After arguing in favor of hiring Vox Machina to defeat an unidentified beast before the council, he fights Vox Machina in his draconic form and nearly kills the group. He then burns down a village and wipes out a battalion of Emon soldiers; as General Krieg, he acts as one of the few survivors. During Vox Machina's investigation of Sir Fince, they break into Krieg's mansion and follow Krieg through a portal into a cavern, where Krieg reveals that he is Brimscythe as he shifts forms. During the ensuing battle, Vax realizes the dragon's weakness is its neck — Vox Machina comes together to allow Grog to land the killing blow.
- Lady Kima of Vord (Stephanie Beatriz): a halfling member of the Tal'Dorei Council and a paladin of The Law Bearer. She and Allura previously fought and imprisoned the red dragon Thordak with the help of the Fire Ashari until he was released by Raishan. She and Allura are in a relationship.
- Lady Allura Vysoren (Indira Varma): a human wizard and a member of the Tal'Dorei Council. She and Kima previously fought and imprisoned the red dragon Thordak with the help of the Fire Ashari until he was released by Raishan. She and Kima are in a relationship.
- Shaun Gilmore (Sunil Malhotra): a human sorcerer who is the owner of the magical shop Gilmore's Glorious Goods and is friends with Vox Machina, specifically Vax. Separated by the Chroma Conclave's initial attack, Vox Machina make their way to Gilmore's shop to regroup. After finding Gilmore in the wreckage of his shop, Pike partially heals him and he allows the group to take whatever they want for free. They gather supplies before Gilmore uses an emergency teleportation crystal to bring them all back to Vox Machina's keep on the outskirts. Following the white dragon Vorugal's attack on the keep, Gilmore flees to Whitestone with Vox Machina. Vax is informed by Keeper Yennen that Gilmore will get the care he needs.
- Captain Jarrett Howarth (Eugene Byrd): the captain of the Arms of Emon.

=== The Fey Realm ===
- Garmelie (Billy Boyd): a spontaneous and irreverent satyr who follows the twins, Keyleth and Percy for entertainment, and inspiration for his lewd drawings. He later guides them to Syngorn and then the Shademurk Bog, where a Vestige of Divergence is located. After members of Vox Machina defeat Saundor, Garmelie opens a portal back to Tal'Dorei for them as payment for entertaining him. He transforms into a man with pointed ears and long, curly red hair after Vox Machina steps through the portal. (Note: It is revealed in the credits of "The Echo Tree" that this creature is in fact the archfey Artagan (voiced by Mercer), a character who was more prominently featured in Critical Role's second campaign.)
- Saundor (Sendhil Ramamurthy): a cursed archfey trapped within a tree in the Shademurk Bog who wielded the bow Fenthras, a Vestige of Divergence. He attempted to ensnare Vex through her pain over her father's mistreatment of her, however, Vex kills him and takes Fenthras.

=== Syngorn ===
Syngorn is a city of elves – it was teleported to the Fey Realm after the Chroma Conclave attacked Emon.

- Ambassador Syldor Vessar (Troy Baker): Vex and Vax's elven father who is an ambassador for the elven city of Syngorn. He treated the twins poorly due to their mixed heritage, which led them to run away from home.
- Devana Vessar (Toks Olagundoye): Vex and Vax's elven step-mother who is more civil to the twins.
- Velora Vessar (Jayla Lavender Nicholas): Vex and Vax's elven half-sister who is happy to meet them.

=== Vasselheim ===
Vasselheim is the capital of the continent of Issylra. It is predominantly a religious city with several districts, each dedicated to a patron deity.

- Highbearer Vord (Sumalee Montano): the leading dignitary of The Platinum Sanctuary, who refuses to help Vox Machina with the dragons.
- Earthbreaker Groon (Ike Amadi): a human monk and dawn marshal of the Stormlord. He fought Grog at the Stormlord's arena to push Grog to see what gives him his strength.
- Victor (Mercer): the eccentric proprietor of a black powder shop where Percy deduces Ripley resupplied. He is missing two fingers on his right hand and most of his hair.

=== Westruun ===
- Kevdak (Ralph Ineson): Grog's uncle who leads the marauding Herd of Storms and wields the Titanstone Knuckles, a Vestige of Divergence. He brutally beat Grog with the Knuckles and left him for dead when Grog didn't uphold the standards of the Herd by allowing an elderly gnome to flee the Herd's attack. He has agreed to pay tribute to the dragon Umbrasyl in exchange for ruling Westruun. Grog challenges him to single combat for the herd, and he later kills him during the battle between Vox Machina and the herd.
- Zanror (Abubakar Salim): Kevdak's son who reluctantly has to serve Umbrasyl with his herd. He challenges his father and is beaten as a result. After killing Kevdak, Grog makes Zanror leader of the herd, and he later helps Vox Machina trap and fight Umbrasyl.
- Kaylie (Aisling Franciosi): A gnome who travels with a band of bards until they're stuck in Westruun. Scanlan helps her and a few people escape the town. During a party to celebrate the herd's freedom from Kevdak, Kaylie takes Scanlan to an inn's room, where she tells him that she's his daughter from a one-night stand. She at first wants to kill him for abandoning her mother and leaving her to raise her by herself, but can't bring herself to do it and decides to let him live with the knowledge that he is a terrible father and person. Scanlan finds and tries to reconnect with her, but fails when he's torn between trying to repair their relationship and helping Vox Machina. Later, with help from Pike, Scanlan sees that Kaylie also wants to patch things up with her father.

=== Whitestone ===
Whitestone is an independent city-state located on the continent's northeastern edge. It was ruled by the de Rolo family until a coup d'état led by the Briarwoods; the first season focuses on Vox Machina's fight with the Briarwoods and their reclamation of the city.

- Lady Delilah Briarwood (Grey Griffin): a necromancer who ruled Whitestone with her husband Sylas after seizing power after they overthrew and killed the de Rolo family. She has necromantic abilities from her studies as a wizard and a mysterious connection to her patron, "The Whispered One," whom she is conducting a ritual for. During the fight with Vox Machina, Delilah attempts to complete the ritual early at the ziggurat beneath Whitestone Castle. The ritual seemingly fails because it was performed before the solstice, summoning only a spinning black orb in place of the Whispered One. Distracted by this, Delilah is shot twice in the back by Percy and is then killed by Cassandra when she attempts to escape. Delilah later returns to lead the Children of Truth, on behalf of the Whispered One. Griffin also voices Percy and Cassandra's mother Lady Johanna de Rolo in flashbacks.
- Lord Sylas Briarwood (Mercer): a vampire who was the self-proclaimed caretaker of Whitestone, Percy's home city. It was he, along with his wife Delilah, who overthrew and killed the de Rolo family several years prior. During the fight with Vox Machina, Keyleth eventually kills him by channeling the power of the Sun Tree into a blast of sunlight. Grog recovers his sword after the fight, which seems to whisper to him.
- Lord Frederick de Rolo (Jaffe): Percy and Cassandra's father who was the previous lord of Whitestone before he and most of his family are killed by the Briarwoods and their allies. Mainly appears in flashbacks.
- Cassandra de Rolo (Esmé Creed-Miles): Percy's sister who was left under the care of the Briarwoods. The Briarwoods used magic to charm her under their will, however, she is freed from this magic when Sylas is killed. Cassandra kills Delilah when she attempts to escape Vox Machina. Cassandra is left in charge of Whitestone when Vox Machina departs for Emon.
- Sir Kerrion Stonefell (Darin De Paul): the Briarwoods' duergar captain of the guard and one of the de Rolo family's killers. When Percy executes him, his name is magically erased from Percy's gun barrel.
- Duke Vedmire (Rory McCann): the Briarwoods' goliath enforcer. He is killed by townspeople when they rose up to defend Whitestone from a horde of undead.
- Professor Anders (Stephen Root): Percy's former teacher who is in league with the Briarwoods after betraying the de Rolos. He attacks Vox Machina and uses magic to take control of Grog, Vex, Keyleth, and Vax to force them to try and kill Percy. When he is killed by Percy, his name dissipates from Percy's gun barrel.
- Archibald Desnay (Dominic Monaghan): a dwarf who is a Whitestone rebel leader and Percy's childhood friend. He is rescued by Vox Machina, however, he is later killed by Vedmire during the onslaught of undead released by the Briarwoods.
- Keeper Yennen (Gina Torres): a religious leader in Whitestone who secretly supports the rebellion against the Briarwoods. In the original campaign the character was an old man.
- Dr. Anna Ripley (Kelly Hu; Kimiko Glenn as a younger Ripley): one of the de Rolo family's murderers who tortured Percy; she eventually turns against the Briarwoods and is imprisoned in Whitestone Castle. After being released by Vox Machina on the condition of her offering them information on the Briarwoods, she successfully escapes from both Vox Machina and the Briarwoods. She later goes to Westruun to inform Umbrasyl of Vox Machina and their plan against the Conclave. She is then shown to be working with Umbrasyl on a quest to gather the Vestiges of Divergence for themselves, for the promise of resources from Umbrasyl. After Umbrasyl's death, she flees to fight another day. She then appears at Ank'Harel, stealing a Vestige with the help of another, and Orthax. She wants Percy to help her expand the gun to a worldwide scale, for profit and equality. She later tells Thordak about Whitestone, which then led to the destruction of it, and Percy reigniting his vendetta against her. Her need for weapons of mass destruction comes from vengeance, against the Cerberus Assembly, who came to her village and killed most of the villagers, in including her father (Lou Diamond Phillips). After a fight with Percy, she manages to kill him with a surprise gun in her sleeve, and escape. Ripley later loses her weapons, and life after the twins went after her.
- Laudna (Marisha Ray): a human hollow one who came back to life, after being one of the people hung from the Sun Tree. She helps Vex in fighting Delilah.

== Other characters by fictional organization ==
=== Ashari ===
- Vilya (Janet Varney): Keyleth's mother and a member of the Air Ashari. She left for her Aramenté when Keyleth was young, and was last seen in Pyrah.
- Korrin (Fred Tatasciore): Keyleth's father and the headmaster of the Air Ashari. He, along with Allura and Kima, helped Cerkonos fend off fire elementals when the fire plane was opened until Vox Machina came to their aid. He then gets blinded by Delilah during Keyleth's coronation.
- Cerkonos (Robbie Daymond): the headmaster of the Fire Ashari in Pyrah, and one of the guardians of the portal to the Elemental Plane of Fire where Thordak was imprisoned.
- Uvenda (Tamara Podemski): the headmistress of the Water Ashari, who denies Keyleth permission of the power to locate others through the earth.
- Pa'tice (Debra Wilson): the headmistress of the Earth Ashari, who helps Keyleth as she goes through the trial to obtain the location power.

=== Children of Truth ===
- Delilah Briarwood: Delilah is the Whispered One's most trusted acolyte and a member of the "Unalive Five" – a name given to the elite members of the Children of Truth by Taryon Darrington.
- The Whispered One (Andy Serkis): a sorcerer who tried to become a god centuries ago, but was defeated by champions. Through Delilah, he returns to establish the cult, while under the disguise of the kindly Shepard Gideon. He became a god when his mortal body dies, and had Vox Machina bow to him, except for Vax whom he then killed.
- Priestess Of Night: the Priestess of Night is a member of the "Unalive Five"
- Death Knight (Riegal): a cult member who was willingly sacrificed to be made anew, and can now match the strength of Grog. The Death Knight is a member of the "Unalive Five"
- Beastmaster (Chris Prynoski): a hunchback man who controls a gloomstalker – a flying bipedal monster. The Beastmaster is a member of the "Unalive Five".
- Luisa (Mindy Sterling): Wilhand's girlfriend, who tried to cure him using the same ritual used to create the Death Knight. She is later killed by Delilah for perverting the said ritual
- The Dark Bard (Tom Cardy): a powerful bard who tried to take Mythcarver from Scanlan. The Dark Bard is a member of the "Unalive Five".

=== Chroma Conclave ===
A group of powerful dragons who have come together to conquer Tal'Dorei; this is unusual as dragons don't normally get along.

- Thordak (Lance Reddick, LeVar Burton as the reanimated version): A fire breathing red dragon; he is the leader of the Conclave. Also known as the "Cinder King"; he was imprisoned by Allura, Kima, and the Fire Ashari until he was mysteriously freed. His ultimate goal is to gather all of Tal'Dorei's gold to create an army of dragons to conquer Exandria. His offspring are then killed, and he is later defeated by Vax, as he tried to flee to regain his strength. His body is then used by Raishan, to be rid of her disease.
- Raishan (Cree Summer): A green dragon who spews poisonous gas. Also known as the "Diseased Deceiver"; she can disguise herself as other people, as evident by taking the form of Keeper Yennen and revealing herself to offer her assistance to defeat Thordak. After helping Vox Machina defeat Thordak, she later betrays them, by taking the body with her, to another location. She then performs a ritual to transform her soul to Thordak's body, to rid herself of the disease placed upon her by the Ashari. She is then defeated by Keyleth, who uses the earth to transfer the disease into her, killing her.
- Umbrasyl (Mercer): A black dragon, known as the "Hope Devourer", with acidic breath and who can rain acid from his wings. Both of which melt those below. Following a lead from Ripley, he tracks down Vox Machina in the Rimecleft and in the ensuing battle, he kills the sphinx Kamaljiori and steals the Vestige known as Mythcarver. After another battle with Vox Machina, he gets killed by Scanlan wielding Mythcarver.
- Vorugal (O'Brien): A white dragon known as the "Frigid Doom" who "flash-freezes victims with an explosion of ice". He tries to kill Vox Machina when they went to Draconia, but after fighting a demon, and the group with Allura and Kima, he later dies from a tree growing out of his chest, from a combined arrow of Vex and Keyleth.
- Brimscythe: an adult blue dragon, he was also known as the "Iron Storm".

=== Cobalt Soul ===
- Yudala Fon: (Sara Ramirez): The High Curator of the Cobalt Soul who is suspicious of Vox Machina bringing in a Vestige.

=== Slayer's Take ===
- Osysa (Alanna Ubach): a sphinx who is the patron of the Slayer's Take, a guild of hunters in Vasselheim. In order to develop the strength needed to defeat the Chroma Conclave, she gives Vox Machina the quest to recover the Vestiges of Divergence. These Vestiges are powerful magic items created during the Calamity to fight the gods themselves. To begin, Osysa directs Vox Machina to a nearby hidden temple for the Matron of Ravens which contains her armor known as the Deathwalker's Ward.
- Kashaw Vesh (Will Friedle): a human cleric, also known as Kash, who flirts with Keyleth. He is later killed by Thordak, during the battle against him.
- Zahra Hydris (Mary Elizabeth McGlynn): a tiefling warlock who holds a grudge towards Vax and Vex for previously stealing a reward for the guild and resents that Osysa revealed the Vestiges to Vox Machina. She convinces Kashaw that they should recover the Deathwalker's Ward instead of Vox Machina.

=== Temple of the Everlight ===
- The Everlight (Tracie Thoms): the goddess of healing, one of the Prime Deities and Pike's patron deity.
- Priestess Talia (Anjali Bhimani): She was a cleric of the Everlight, who helps Pike on her crisis of faith journey. After the events of the Chroma Conclave, where her daughter dies, she becomes part of the Children of Truth in the hope she would be resurrected.

== Additional characters ==
- Mercer as:
  - Orthax: a shadow demon who possessed Percy's pepperbox to help him kill those who killed his family, with the intent to take his soul as well. Scanlan destroys him after throwing Percy's pepperbox into a pool of acid. He makes a return, working with Ripley in gathering more Vestiges.
  - Craven Edge: a sentient sword formerly owned by Lord Briarwood which is now in the possession of Grog. It gives off an evil aura, which is noticed by both Earthbreaker Groon and Pike. Grog later destroys Craven Edge after he almost kills Pike with it. The destruction of the sword leaves him with diminished physical strength.
- Kamaljiori (Tony Plana): Osysa's mate who will only disclose the location of the other Vestiges to Vox Machina if one of them can wound him. Scanlan is the only one who manages to do so—performing a lamenting love song that hurts Kamaljiori emotionally. After gifting Mythcarver to Scanlan; Kamaljiori is killed by Umbrasyl in a battle for the Vestige. His head is later seen in Umbrasyl's lair, as a part of the dragon's hoard.
- Wilhand Trickfoot (Henry Winkler): Pike's great-great-grandfather who is a devout follower of the Everlight. He was saved by a young Grog when the Herd of Storms attacked his settlement. Wilhand brought Pike to heal Grog as Grog was kicked out of the Herd and left for dead for saving Wilhand. He later helps Pike and Scanlan remove the corruption caused by Craven Edge, which should allow Grog to recover his strength.
- The Matron of Ravens (Courtenay Taylor): the goddess of death who makes Vax her champion, the one who balances life and death on her behalf, in exchange for Vex's life.
- Elaina (Bailey): the twins' mother, who died during a siege by Thordak.
- Lionel Gayheart (Jon Heder): Scanlan's bouncer for his magically appearing bar.

== Reception ==
Madison Durham, for Polygon in 2022, wrote that "the characterization of Keyleth in the animated series is entirely consistent with how Ray played her in the show, refined and honed for this new format" and acts as "redemption" for the character. During the first season, Durham comments that the audience "not only to see Keyleth overcome small moments of uncertainty, but are also treated to the visualization of her power — power she wields first as small blooms of flowers or vines, that blossoms into blazing orbs of pure sunlight and towering walls of ice. Members of her own party are forced to acknowledge her prowess". She also highlighted the changes to Keyleth and Vax's romance and called it a "deft move on the part of the writers and animators". Andrea Towers, for TV Insider in 2023, wrote that "the animated series is doing something remarkable: it's opening up Keyleth to an entirely new segment of fans, both new and old, who are falling in love with her endearing nature and struggles with self-confidence and seeing her in an entirely different way than people did a few years ago. The narrative of the show — especially the second season, which is allowing the character to come into her own and take on more responsibility — is proving that the very things that made the character so contentious in the first place are the things that make her one of, if not the most, valuable and relatable character in the adventuring group".

Brenton Stewart, for CBR in 2022, commented that while many members of Vox Machina fit "classical fantasy tropes," Percy resists "almost any box of a fantasy archetype fans might try to fit him into" which makes him "more unique and interesting each time his backstory unravels". Stewart wrote that "part of The Legend of Vox Machina's fun is that the characters are so diverse, there is something different for everyone and a little something to enjoy in each of them. The show would not be the same if it focused on Percy alone, yet it's hard to make any comparisons where he does not stand out as the most unique character worthy of focus".

Madison Durham, for Polygon during the show's second season, wrote that "Vex'ahlia is not on the surface someone who is in any way fragile. She is bold, and self-confident, and unremorseful about the things she wants. She can also be prickly and stubborn. Beneath her bravado, though, lurks a very big heart. Big enough to rescue an orphaned bear cub, fierce enough to protect her brother and her friends, and kind enough to welcome a half-sister with open arms". Durham highlighted the adaptation of Vex's conflict with her father and her fight with Saundor. She commented that "the animated series has done an amazing job at allowing all the characters in the show to stand on their own feet — in particular, they've been writing the women of the show beautifully".

James Grebey, for Vulture in 2023, commented on the character design of the Chroma Conclave – "the stylistic choice to make the dragons computer generated, rather than the more traditional-looking animation of the human characters and backgrounds, sometimes sticks out, but it only makes [the Chroma Conclave's invasion of Emon] sequence even more effective. The Chroma Conclave is not normal. It is out of Vox Machina's league by an unfathomable degree". Grebey highlighted the abilities of each dragon and on Thordak, he wrote "lest you think a normal fire-breathing dragon seems generic after his fellow dragons' unique, gruesome abilities, the series does something new and awe inspiring when the Thordak's fire turns into a brilliant white beam that instantly levels the city".
