= Encyclopedia Magica =

Tabletop role-playing game supplement

- Volume One
- Genre: Role-playing games
- Publisher: TSR
- Publication date: 1994–1995

Volume Two

Volume Three

Volume Four

The Encyclopedia Magica is a four-volume series of accessories for the 2nd edition of the Advanced Dungeons & Dragons fantasy role-playing game, published in 1994–1995.

== Contents ==
Encyclopedia Magica is a four-volume set intended to present every magic item ever published for Dungeons & Dragons up to that point, from Abacus of Calculation to Zwieback of Zymurgy. The books in this series list every magical item published in all boxed sets and game supplements and every magazine article published for the AD&D game system from the previous 20 years. The books total more than 1500 pages over the four volumes, and each is bound in a plastic jacket resembling leather. Entries for the series were reproduced from sources including the Dungeon Master's Guide, the Dungeons & Dragons Basic Set and Dungeons & Dragons Expert Set, adventure modules and campaign settings, magazines such as Dragon.

The fourth volume contains an index covering the entire set, and a table for rolling random magic items from the complete series, and includes some of the most numerous categories with entries on swords, staves, and wands. According to game designer Kevin Kulp, there was "no attempt to correct rule imbalances, edit entries, or even match game mechanics to one particular edition of the game".

== Publication history ==
Encyclopedia Magica was a result of compilation and development by Dale "slade" Henson, and was published by TSR. Encyclopedia Magica Volume One was released in 1994, while Encyclopedia Magica Volume Two was printed in February 1995, Encyclopedia Magica Volume Three was printed in May 1995, and Encyclopedia Magica Volume Four was printed in November 1995. Development and editing was by Doug Stewart. Interior black and white art for the series was by Arnie Swekel, while the four volumes featured interior color art variously by Gerald Brom, Clyde Caldwell, Jeff Easley, Fred Fields, Tim Hildebrandt, Jennell Jaquays, (Note: Credited as Paul Jaquays.) John and Laura Lakey, Roger Loveless, Keith Parkinson, Roger Raupp, and Robh Ruppel.

"The credits acknowledge James M. Ward, 'for laughing when he heard slade had this project'".

== Reception ==
In Dragon magazine #218 (June 1995), Rick Swan stated that these reference books possess "a diligence on the part of the researchers that borders on the superhuman". He said the series "A must for Dungeon Masters who want to spruce up their campaigns, and for every TSR contributor who longs to see his masterpiece immortalized in an upscale format."

Scott Haring reviewed Encyclopedia Magica for Pyramid magazine and stated that "Congratulations to TSR for taking a nearly impossible-sounding job and devoting the time and expertise to getting it right. There's nothing sloppy or careless about these books - a first-class job all the way, and a must-have for any AD&D player."

Cliff Ramshaw reviewed Encyclopedia Magica Volume Four for Arcane magazine, rating it a 4 out of 10 overall. He wrote that it was Mostly for completists and that the items presented in the fourth volume were often silly.

The Encyclopedia Magica, Volume 1 won the Origins Award for Best Roleplaying Supplement of 1994.

== Reviews ==
- Rollespilsmagasinet Fønix (Danish) (Issue 8 - May/June 1995)
