= Volo's Guide to All Things Magical =

Accessory for Advanced Dungeons & Dragons

- Genre: Role-playing games
- Publisher: TSR
- Publication date: 1996

Volo's Guide to All Things Magical is an accessory for the 2nd edition of the Advanced Dungeons & Dragons fantasy role-playing game, published in 1996.

== Contents ==
Volo's Guide to All Things Magical is a supplement involving the adventurer Volo who writes guides to Forgotten Realms regions to aid adventurers in Faerûn. The guide notes that its contents may not always be accurate, but it presents 65 new spells, information about characters that know these spells, statistics for new magical items, details on various magical locations, a section about how to craft magic items, and information about the form of magic called Spellfire.

== Publication history ==
Volo's Guide to All Things Magical was designed by Ed Greenwood with Eric L. Boyd, and published by TSR in 1996.

== Reception ==
Paul Pettengale reviewed Volo's Guide to All Things Magical for Arcane magazine, rating it a 7 out of 10 overall. He refers to Volo (whom Pettengale consistently calls "Rolo" instead) as "a famous AD&D adventurer" who is "one of those characters that everyone's heard about, and one that just about every Dungeon Master must have been tempted to introduce to their campaign at some point or another. Anyhow, Rolo's now branched out trying his hand at compiling a guide to, well, All Things Magical." Pettengale comments on how the book's contents may not actually be true: "that's up to the ref - you can't have the players thinking they know everything about magic in the Realms". He also comments on the new form of magic in the book: "What's that called? Why, Spellfire of course, which just happens to be the name of a certain collectible card game by TSR. Spellfire is a complicated business, and I wouldn't actually encourage any DM to give it to a player to use; it's way too powerful for the majority of campaigns, and the very possession of it suggests close affiliation with Mystra, which most wizards would never aspire to." Pettengale concluded his review by saying: "There's a hell of a lot of information packed into these 128 pages. It would take weeks to assimilate it all, and months on end of gaming to incorporate it all into your campaign world, The fact that the ref can ignore it at will is important – you really don't want the players thinking they know too much, and, if I were to use it I think I'd actually ban my players from reading it Used as a ref's magical guide in its own right, Rolo's Guide to All Things Magical is an interesting and worthy addition to the lore of the Realms, with plenty going for it."
