= The Hole Idea =

- Title card
- Directed by: Robert McKimson
- Story by: Sid Marcus
- Starring: Mel Blanc; Bea Benaderet
- Narrated by: Robert C. Bruce
- Music by: Milt Franklyn
- Animation by: Robert McKimson
- Layouts by: Richard H. Thomas
- Backgrounds by: Richard H. Thomas
- Color process: Technicolor
- Production company: Warner Bros. Cartoons
- Distributed by: Warner Bros. Pictures
- Release date: April 16, 1955 (USA)
- Running time: 6:51
- Language: English

The Hole Idea is a Warner Bros. Looney Tunes cartoon directed and animated by Robert McKimson with character layout and background layout and paint by Richard H. Thomas. The short was released on April 16, 1955.

== Plot ==
A scientist, Professor Calvin Q. Calculus, successfully creates a portable hole invention, despite disapproval from his wife, Gertrude, who keeps on rambling throughout the short. His creation is celebrated in a newsreel, showcasing the various uses for a portable hole: Rescuing a baby from a safe, cheating at your golf game and giving dogs a new place to bury their bones. Spurred by the film, a thief steals a briefcase containing Calvin's portable holes and uses them for criminal purposes, including emptying Fort Knox and abducting a dancing girl from a burlesque house. However, he is chased by the police until he is backed against a wall, when he uses the last portable hole in the briefcase to go through the wall and seemingly escape, it is revealed that the other side is inside a prison. Calvin reads about the arrest in the paper and is glad, but Gertrude berates him furiously for not treating her right and says that one of them must leave. In retaliation, Calvin creates one more portable hole and throws it on the floor. The nagging and domineering wife steps in it and falls through it. After a few seconds, Satan comes up the portable hole, throws her back to Earth and complains in response: "Isn't it bad enough down there without her?" as the cartoon ends.

== Production and reception ==
The Hole Idea was the first short Robert McKimson directed following Warner Bros. Cartoons' brief shutdown in 1953. McKimson has begun work on the cartoon early that year, just before his unit was disbanded two months before the entire studio was closed that June. While he was able to convince Warner Bros. to bring back his unit after the studio reopened, the lack of needed funds prevented him from retrieving his animators who were at this point scattered across the industry. McKimson served as the sole animator for the short aside from layout and background work by Richard H. Thomas.

While producer Edward Selzer refused to put up the short for consideration of an Academy Award, McKimson has said that his colleagues, Chuck Jones and Friz Freleng, praised the film. The cartoon would however win an award from the University of Wisconsin, as it was the only one that entered the category for best short subjects of that year.

== Home media ==
The Hole Idea is available on disc 4 of the Looney Tunes Golden Collection: Volume 6 DVD set.

== See also ==
- List of American films of 1955
