= The Rod of Seven Parts (novel) =

1996 novel by Douglas Niles

- Author: Douglas Niles
- Language: English
- Genre: Fantasy
- Published: 1996
- Publication place: United States
- Media type: Print

The Rod of Seven Parts is a fantasy novel by Douglas Niles, based on the Dungeons & Dragons role-playing game, published in 1996.

== Plot summary ==
The Rod of Seven Parts is a novel in which the thief Kip Kayle gets drawn into a quest that involves restoring the Rod of Seven Parts, and this quest ultimately turns into an immense cosmic battle involving the forces of both Law and Chaos.

== Reception ==
Trenton Webb reviewed The Rod of Seven Parts for Arcane magazine, rating it a 7 out of 10 overall. He commented that "The Rod Of Seven Parts doesn't even pretend to be a 'proper' book; glibly ignoring such trifling conventions as characterisation, pacing and structure. It's a work of reportage that (almost too) accurately recreates the feel of an actual game in play which - as a teaser for the forthcoming campaign based on the 'legendary' artifact - is exactly what it should be." He continued by saying "The story starts with a furious duel between a Wind Duke and Lycosyd, and from that moment on, the pace is unrelenting. This speed of delivery helps paper over a few cracks. The characters are functional class/race archetypes, while their dialogue has the air of 'real' conversations culled from players under pressure, rather than being considered character-developing speech. The plot pushes everything on at such a rate that many questions are left unanswered." Webb went on to say that "The resolution of cliffhangers is often illogical and regularly beyond the control of the central cast. All their escapes seem plausible at first, but on reflection are increasingly dissatisfying, Yet somehow the sensation of gamers at play surfaces, because when logic falls foul of fun, the characters (players?) are winging it. Such 'amateurish' elements should both damn the book to the same plane of hell as the main villain Miska; but don't." He added, "The mix of monsters is right, escalating from ogres through to top- notch tannari. The setting continually changes, moving swiftly from the familiar dungeon environment through city streets to the planes of Pandemonium. There are big heroes and big villains. And you get to meet and fight them both." Webb concludes the review by saying, "The flaws restrict rather than cripple The Rod Of Seven Parts, (even though the way it handles laws regarding alignment is extremely annoying). Aimed at a hard-core D&D audience, it's an enjoyable tale told with enough raw enthusiasm to maintain the 'live and direct from the tabletop' feel. If your gaming palette has become jaded of late, it's an ideal tonic."

== Reviews ==
- Review by Don D'Ammassa (1998) in Science Fiction Chronicle, #197 May–June 1998
