= Falconmaster =

Dungeons & Dragons adventure module

- The cover of Falconmaster, with art by Ken Frank, depicts a falcon carrying a torn battle standard in its talons.
- Code: WGA2
- TSR product code: 9289
- Rules required: Advanced Dungeons & Dragons 2nd edition
- Character levels: 5 - 7
- Campaign setting: Greyhawk
- Authors: Richard W. and Anne Brown
- First published: 1990

Linked modules
- WGA1, WGA2, WGA3, WGA4

Falconmaster is an adventure module published in 1990 for the Advanced Dungeons & Dragons fantasy role-playing game.

== Plot summary ==
Falconmaster is the sequel to Falcon's Revenge, and is an adventure scenario in which the player characters try to find a cult leader. The module includes fold-up cardstock buildings.

== Publication history ==
WGA2 Falconmaster was written by Richard W. and Anne Brown, with a cover by Ken Frank, and was published by TSR in 1990 as a 64-page booklet with cardstock sheets and an outer folder.

This adventure is part of a series of three scenarios that starts with WGA1 Falcon's Revenge, continues with WGA2 Falconmaster, and concludes with WGA3 Flames of the Falcon.
