= Portable hole =

Fictional device which can create a passageway through solid surfaces

In various works of speculative fiction, a portable hole is a two-dimensional device that can be used to contravene the laws of physics by creating a passage through a solid surface, through which characters can move.

== Notable uses ==
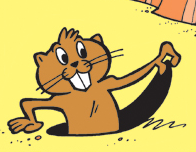
A cartoon character manipulating a portable hole

The 1955 Looney Tunes cartoon, The Hole Idea, presents a fictional account in which Calvin Q. Calculus invents the device. Another early Looney Tunes example, Beep Prepared from 1961, developed the trope further and features the Road Runner lifting a (previously ordinary) hole off the ground, carrying it, then laying it down for the Coyote to fall through; the hole in this case is mundane until the start of the gag, as opposed to an intentional scientific creation as in The Hole Idea. The concept was shown in The Beatles' 1968 movie, Yellow Submarine, where Ringo picks up a hole from the Sea of Holes, stores it in his pocket, and uses it later to release Sgt. Pepper's Band from captivity. In 1988, Who Framed Roger Rabbit again used a portable hole as a plot device. Detective Eddie Valiant is able to escape being crushed by a steamroller by using one, echoing the 1955 Looney Tunes gag. The 1988 cartoon series The New Adventures of Winnie the Pooh features a portable hole with similar properties in the episode "Bubble Trouble."

In the Dungeons & Dragons fantasy role-playing game, a portable hole is a circle of cloth made from phase spider webs, strands of ether and beams of starlight. When deployed, it creates an extradimensional space six feet in diameter by ten feet deep. Folding the cloth causes the entrance to this space to disappear, but items placed inside the hole remain there. Sufficient air is contained in the hole to support life for up to ten minutes. In the novelization of E.T. the Extra-Terrestrial, Elliott uses a portable hole when the lead characters are playing Dungeons & Dragons.

In episode 695 of the Final Fantasy-based comic 8-Bit Theater, Fighter, after buying some items and a portable hole with Red Mage, decides to "work smarter, not harder", and put all the items into the portable hole. He then proceeds to fold the portable hole into itself.

In Rajiv Joseph's play, Guards at the Taj, one of the characters, Humayun, invents a transportable hole. Humayun describes it as a hole one can carry and attach to anything to make a hole in it.

== Other uses of the term ==
A 1933 newspaper described John Williamson's underwater photography apparatus as a portable "hole in the sea". It was a bendable tube from the ship to the sea bottom for a photographer to descend.

A 1949 newspaper column by Truman Twill speculates on a prefabricated underground storage unit described as "a portable hole to be sunk in the ground at a desirable location".

Gramicidin A has been described as a portable hole; it is a polypeptide with a helical shape. When it forms a dimer, it can embed itself in cellular bilayer membranes and form a hole through which water molecules can pass.

The Museum of Modern Art has a work by Ben Vautier titled, The First Portable Hole (Le Premier trou portatif).

In Shari Lewis presents 101 magic tricks for kids to do, a trick named "the portable hole" is described. A card trick titled Acme Portable Hole is available commercially.

== See also ==
- Hammerspace
- Bag of holding
- Teleportation in fiction
- Wormholes
- Portal (video game)
