= Dungeons & Dragons Gazetteer =

2000 book about Dungeons & Dragons

- Illustrator: Dennis Cramer
- Genre: Role-playing game
- Published: 2000 (Wizards of the Coast)
- Media type: Print
- Pages: 32
- ISBN: 0-7869-1742-3
- OCLC: 45080546

The Dungeons & Dragons Gazetteer is a supplement to the 3rd edition of the Dungeons & Dragons role-playing game.

== Contents ==
The Dungeons & Dragons Gazetteer details the lands of Greyhawk, the 3rd edition core world of Dungeons & Dragons. The book's introduction noted that the D&D game setting is located on Oerth, more specifically on the continent of Oerik, in its easternmost portion called the Flanaess. The book then goes on the briefly cover the history of the region, as well as an atlas that provides a short description of the most important kingdoms. There is also a chapter on geography, and a listing of some of the most influential groups in the region.

== Publication history ==
In 1980, D&D co-creator Gary Gygax released the World of Greyhawk Fantasy Game Setting, a 32-page gazetteer of Gygax's World of Greyhawk. This was updated several times over the next decade. After the takeover of TSR by Wizards of the Coast and the development of a third edition of D&D, the company published a new Gazetteer in 2000 using the same 32-page format originally used by Gygax twenty years previously.

The Dungeons & Dragons Gazetteer was written by Gary Holian, Erik Mona, Sean Reynolds, and Frederick Weining, with cover art was by Sam Wood, with interior art by Dennis Cramer.

== Reception ==
In Issue 24 of the French role-playing magazine Backstab, Cyril Pasteau noted that 32 pages was not enough to "synthesize a universe as vast as that of Grehyawk." Pasteau concluded, "Unfortunately, there is not enough material for a beginning gamemaster to build their own campaign."
