= Greyhawk: The Adventure Begins =

1998 book by Roger E. Moore

- Author: Roger E. Moore
- Cover artist: Tony Szczudlo
- Language: English
- Genre: Fantasy; Role-playing game
- Publisher: Wizards of the Coast / TSR
- Publication date: 1998
- Publication place: United States
- Pages: 128
- ISBN: 0-7869-1249-9
- OCLC: 41888759

Greyhawk: The Adventure Begins is a 1998 sourcebook for the World of Greyhawk campaign setting for the Dungeons & Dragons roleplaying game. The 128 page book was written by Roger E. Moore and published by Wizards of the Coast under the TSR imprint it had recently acquired.

== Contents ==
The Adventure Begins is a supplement which provides an overview of the world of Oerth, with updates on the world's history, notable events on the calendar, and descriptions of the cultural and geographical divisions found in the area. The book provides detailed information on the City of Greyhawk, the largest and most populous city of Oerth, including specifics on items such as its ruling council and criminal codes, and descriptions of important locations and characters of the city.

== Publication history ==
The Adventure Begins was published in July 1998. The book was intended to provide a bridge between previous Greyhawk products, and the relaunch of the new product line. The book updates material from the earlier From the Ashes.

The book was the first in a series of publications designed to re-launch the Greyhawk campaign setting, followed by other sourcebooks and adventure modules set in Greyhawk such as Return to the Temple of Elemental Evil and Return to the Tomb of Horrors.

== Reception ==
James MacDuff reviewed The Adventure Begins in 1998, in Shadis #50. Comparing it to the first release for the relaunch, Return of the Eight, MacDuff found this book contained more solid material about the setting. He found that the book offered little new information about Greyhawk City, and much of the material reiterates information from the old City of Greyhawk boxed set: "Anyone who owns CoG will likely feel cheated by the rehashed material, and while the timeline updates are welcome, they don't justify the overall cost of the product." MacDuff felt that older players would be likely to purchase the book just to keep up with the changes, but that new players would fare better as they would avoid the frustration of hunting down out of print material because the new book is both concise and complete. He noted that the thoroughness with which Roger E. Moore covers Oerth makes for a fast start to a Greyhawk campaign, making The Adventure Begins indispensable. MacDuff concluded the review by saying, "As an outline of the world and a way to quickly start things, it gets the information aspiring GMs need. If Return of the Eight caters solely to old players, this one more than makes up for the difference."

Greyhawk: The Adventure Begins won the 1998 Origins Award for Best Roleplaying Supplement.

== Reviews ==
- Backstab #11
- Backstab #21

== See also ==
- World of Greyhawk Fantasy Game Setting
- From the Ashes (Dungeons & Dragons)
- Living Greyhawk Gazetteer
