= Vecna Lives! =

Dungeons & Dragons adventure module

- The cover of Vecna Lives!, with art by Jeff Easley, depicts the desiccated hand of Vecna reaching up out of a golden chalice with a ring of standing stones in the background.
- Code: WGA4
- TSR product code: 9309
- Rules required: Advanced Dungeons & Dragons 2nd edition
- Character levels: 12 – 15
- Campaign setting: Greyhawk
- Authors: David "Zeb" Cook
- First published: 1990

Linked modules
- WGA1, WGA2, WGA3, WGA4

Vecna Lives! is an adventure module for the Dungeons & Dragons fantasy roleplaying game, set in the game's World of Greyhawk campaign setting.

== Plot summary ==
The adventure concerns the lich Vecna and his disembodied hand and eye—both powerful magical artifacts. The arch-lich Vecna and his cult are plotting to change Oerth forever. The adventure starts with a scene in which the players play the City of Greyhawk's great Circle of Eight wizards. Vecna has ascended to demigod status, and serves as the ultimate foe for the adventurers in the module. Assuming the players are successful in defeating Vecna, he is transported to and imprisoned within the Ravenloft campaign setting.

== Publication history ==
The module bears the code WGA4 and was published by TSR, Inc. in 1990 for the second edition Advanced Dungeons & Dragons rules. The module was written by David "Zeb" Cook and edited by Mike Breault with cover art by Jeff Easley and interior art by Ken Frank.

== Reception ==
Allen Varney briefly reviewed Vecna Lives! for Dragon magazine #175 (November 1991). According to Varney, this adventure is "yet another way to scare players". He felt that after the first scene, the rest of the adventure is "more routine", but advised that the heroes "have many chances to mess this one up big-time, and that will transform your campaign in ways you may not want. For fans of high-level AD&D adventures, though, this is definitely worth a look."

DieHard GameFan said that "Vecna Lives! is one of my favorite adventures from Second Edition Advanced Dungeons & Dragons [...] Even if you never play the adventure, you should go out of your way to read/download/borrow it just to see what an incredible example of storytelling and adventure writing it is."

Jonathan Bolding, for The Escapist, wrote, "The first thing that happens in this game is that you kill the eight most powerful people in the world. Then the PCs have to fix it all. It's one of the finest examples of the kind of high-stakes adventures that have always best defined high level D&D play, where failure by the players means the complete undoing of all that is good and just in reality. The adventure itself is fairly standard - though remarkably episodic for its time period, dealing with a romping journey through the whole of the world and planes beyond. It's very much adventure fiction, but interspersed with a desperate, survival-horror feel as the players are stalked by the returned demi-god lich and his undead minions".

== See also ==
- Die Vecna Die!
