= Aurora's Whole Realms Catalog =

Tabletop role-playing game supplement

- Author: Anne Brown and J. Robert King
- Genre: Role-playing games
- Published: 1992 (TSR)
- Media type: Print
- Pages: 147
- ISBN: 1-56076-327-2

Aurora's Whole Realms Catalog is an accessory for the Dungeons & Dragons fantasy role-playing game, published for the Forgotten Realms setting.

== Contents ==
Aurora's Whole Realms Catalogue focuses on whimsical items, offering an eclectic inventory that includes bard's instruments, household items, and 14 types of cheese. The designers modeled the book after an actual turn-of-the-century mail-order catalog, meaning that exaggerated salesmanship accompanies each product description.

== Publication history ==
Aurora's Whole Realms Catalogue was written by Anne Brown and J. Robert King, and published by TSR, Inc.

== Reception ==
Rick Swan reviewed Aurora's Whole Realms Catalogue for Dragon magazine #192 (April 1993). He calls the catalogue's subject, Aurora, "the fictional proprietress of a medieval Wal-Mart", and points out the "death cheese" as an interesting exotic item, "a rich, delicate addition to the dining table, exotic both in its taste and the method by which it is acquired", in that it is made from catoblepas milk. Swan concludes this review by saying: "Better suited for browsers than hardcore gamers, Aurora's Whole Realms Catalogue is among the least essential of the equipment guides, but it's one of the most entertaining."

== Reviews ==
- Dragão Brasil (Issue 41 - Aug 1998) (Portuguese)
