= Ship of Horror =

Dungeons & Dragons module

- Code: RA2
- First published: 1991

Ship of Horror is an adventure for the 2nd edition of the Advanced Dungeons & Dragons fantasy role-playing game, released in 1991. It was written by Anne Brown and published by TSR, Inc.

== Contents ==
According to reviewer Gene Alloway, the module is for a group of player characters of levels 8–10. Gameplay takes place in the world of Ravenloft. A notable aspect of the story is the well-developed non-player characters, including Captain Garvyn of the ship Endurance. Galloway states that the setting's mood is excellent as well: "Sights, sounds, smells, and creepy feelings are described in such a way as to make you look over your shoulder". He also highlighted the artwork of Clyde Caldwell and Stephen Fabian as noteworthy.

== Publication history ==
Ship of Horror was published by TSR, Inc. in 1991.

== Reception ==
Gene Alloway reviewed the module in the May/June 1992 issue of White Wolf Magazine. He assessed that it is "one of the better efforts by TSR" and "you can't go wrong here. This is one adventure that you will have a good ol' scary time with". He rated the game an overall 4 out of a possible 5.

In 2013, Alex Lucard, for Diehard GameFAN, wrote that "Ship of Horror gives you all the unique themes of Ravenloft. Your characters have to deal with Fear and Horror checks. There are Powers checks when you do evil acts or cast certain spells. You have to stop the machinations of a Darklord, and it is also designed to introduce players and DMs to Ravenloft. This means the characters can enter and leave the Dark Domain from just this adventure. It’s a good gauge to see if players will want more. [...] The staging of a large scale battle on a ship is something that both the PCs and DM will find incredibly memorable, and it will also force everyone to use different tactics unless they want the boat to sink".

== Reviews ==
- Envoyer #6
