= Book of Fiends, Volume Two: Armies of the Abyss =

Book of Fiends, Volume Two: Armies of the Abyss is a 2002 supplement for d20 System role-playing games published by Green Ronin Publishing.

== Contents ==
Book of Fiends, Volume Two: Armies of the Abyss is a supplement in which a demon‑focused sourcebook details dozens of fiends and their princes, introduces the demon‑bound thaumaturge class, and provides extensive lore, spells, and tools for bringing the chaotic horrors of the Abyss into a campaign.

== Reviews ==
- Pyramid
- Fictional Reality #9
- d20Zine #1 (June, 2002)
