= The Marklands =

D&D module and supplement

- Code: WGR4
- TSR product code: 9398
- Rules required: 2nd Ed AD&D
- Character levels: N/A
- Campaign setting: Greyhawk
- Authors: Carl Sargent
- First published: 1993

The Marklands is a sourcebook for the Dungeons & Dragons fantasy role-playing game that describes the realms of Furyondy, Highfolk, Nyrond in the game's World of Greyhawk campaign setting. The sourcebook bears the code WGR4 and was published by TSR in 1993 for the second edition Advanced Dungeons & Dragons rules.

== Contents ==
The Marklands provides detailed information regarding Furyondy, Highfolk, and Nyrond in the aftermath of the Greyhawk Wars.

== Publication history ==
The sourcebook was written by Carl Sargent with cover art by Jeff Easley and interior art by Eric Hotz. It was designed to supplement Sargent's From the Ashes boxed set for Greyhawk.
