= Vecna: Eve of Ruin =

Role-playing game adventure

- Rules required: Dungeons & Dragons, 5th edition
- First published: 2024
- ISBN: 9780786969470

Vecna: Eve of Ruin is an adventure module for the 5th edition of the Dungeons & Dragons fantasy role-playing game.

== Summary ==
The villain Vecna plans the end of existence. Player characters adventure alongside legendary allies from other Dungeons & Dragons adventures to stop his plans.

== Reception ==
A review for Screen Rant praised the adventure for its handling of powerful players, its high difficulty and its attention to source material. It criticized the frantic pacing, comparing it to a greatest hits album, and noted the adventure was not suited for new players. Another article compared the adventure favorably to Tomb of Horrors, praising its opportunity for roleplay, player choice and the logic of its Tomb of Wayward Souls.

A review for Wargamer praised the variety of play of social interaction, puzzle solving, exploration and combat in diverse locations of epic scale, such as Sigil, the Underdark, Eberron, Barovia, Krynn, and the Astral Sea of Spelljammer. However, it criticized the narrative logic and amount of preparation needed by the Dungeon Master.
