= Living Greyhawk Journal =

Role-playing game magazine, 2000–2004

The Living Greyhawk Journal was a periodical published by the Role-Playing Games Association (RPGA) as a stand-alone magazine from 2000 to 2004. It was published by Wizards of the Coast. The publication was intended to supplement the RPGA's Living Greyhawk campaign, though many consider the content within to be canon for the Greyhawk setting in general. The first six issues (#0-5) were stand-alone magazines, with subsequent issues folded into Dragon (#6-20) and Dungeon (#21-24).
