= Carl Sargent =

British parapsychologist and fantasy game designer (1952–2018)

Carl Lynwood Sargent (11 December 1952 – 12 September 2018) was a British parapsychologist and author of several roleplaying game-based products and novels, who used the pen name Keith Martin to write Fighting Fantasy gamebooks.

== Early life and education ==
Sargent was schooled in South Wales and the West of England. He then attended Churchill College, Cambridge, majoring in the natural sciences, and graduated with honours in psychology in 1974. He received a PhD in 1979 for a work which bore on parapsychology, and went on to undertake post-doctoral research in parapsychology at the Psychological Laboratory of the University of Cambridge. Sargent was the first parapsychologist to obtain a Cambridge doctorate. He taught psychology at the same university. Many of his experiments were made using students from the science and geography departments opposite the Psychology department on the Downing Site, paying £2-3 per experiment; the main task would be to guess the colour or value of the next card to be chosen.

== Parapsychology ==
Sargent held a PhD in psychology (or experimental parapsychology), which he earned in 1979. He performed numerous ganzfeld experiments, designed to draw out psi abilities, at the University of Cambridge. His published works in this field include Explaining the Unexplained: Mysteries of the Paranormal, co-authored with Hans Eysenck. The book received a positive review in the New Scientist by John Beloff who described it as "an introduction to parapsychology that one can put into the hands of an inquiring student without embarrassment."

In their book Sargent and Eysenck argued that the experiments of William Crookes with the medium Daniel Dunglas Home were evidence for supernatural powers. Sargent wrote a negative review of Ruth Brandon's The Spiritualists, a book which claimed Home and other spiritualist mediums were fraudulent. R. W. Morrell commenting in the New Scientist on the review wrote "Carl Sargent would have us believe that D. D. Home was not caught out as a fraud. Sadly for Dr Sargent, though, he was", Morrell concluded that Sargent had displayed a personal gullibility.

=== Criticism ===
Sargent's ganzfeld experiments have been criticized for being open to error and fraud. Susan Blackmore, who visited Sargent's laboratory in Cambridge, detected several errors and failures to follow the protocol during an experiment. Sargent would later leave the field of parapsychology altogether. Writing for Skeptical Inquirer Blackmore states that Sargent "deliberately violated his own protocols and in one trial had almost certainly cheated." Psychologists reading Daryl Bem's review in Psychological Bulletin would "not have a clue that serious doubt had been cast on more than a quarter of the studies involved" Sargent and Chuck Honortons. When Blackmore confronted Sargent, he told her "it wouldn't matter if some experiments were unreliable because, after all, we know that psi exists".

=== Parapsychology publications ===
- Eysenck, Hans; Sargent, Carl (1982). Explaining the Unexplained: Mysteries of the Paranormal. Weidenfeld & Nicolson. ISBN 0-297-78068-9.
- Eysenck, Hans; Sargent, Carl (1983). Know Your Own PSI-Q. Michael Joseph. ISBN 0-718-12244-5.
- Sargent, Carl (1988). Personality, Divination & the Tarot. Destiny Books. ISBN 0-89281-219-2.

== Fantasy games ==
Sargent started playing Dungeons & Dragons in 1978 through friends. TSR UK were based in Cambridge, and they met with Sargent after he had submitted an article to Imagine magazine. The TSR UK crew later left to work for Games Workshop.

Sargent authored various Fighting Fantasy gamebooks and novels for Games Workshop from 1988 to 1995, some under the pseudonym Keith Martin. Games Workshop moved its last remaining role-playing game line, Warhammer Fantasy Roleplay, to its new subsidiary Flame Publications in 1989, and Sargent was one of the freelancers that aided this new company. Sargent still did work for TSR, and his From the Ashes (1992) moved the setting of the Greyhawk world into a period of heavier conflict.

He later worked as a freelance designer, and was brought in by TSR to work on Greyhawk. Most of his role-playing works were published between 1987 and 1996. He has authored many products for the Dungeons & Dragons (particularly for the World of Greyhawk setting), Warhammer Fantasy Roleplay and Shadowrun roleplaying games.

=== Role-playing publications as Carl Sargent ===
- Sargent, Carl (1987). Warhammer City. The Enemy Within Campaign. Warhammer: Games Workshop. p. 95. ISBN 1-869893-24-7.
- Sargent, Carl (1988). Power Behind the Throne. The Enemy Within Campaign. Warhammer: Games Workshop. p. 114. ISBN 1-869893-43-3.
- Sargent, Carl (1989). Empire in Flames. The Enemy Within Campaign. Warhammer: Games Workshop. p. 154. ISBN 1-872372-08-2.
- Sargent, Carl (1989). The Restless Dead. Warhammer: Games Workshop. ISBN 1-869893-73-5.
- Sargent, Carl (1990). Lichemaster. Warhammer: Flame Publication. ISBN 1-872372-01-5.
- Sargent, Carl (1991). Death's Dark Shadow. Warhammer: Flame Publication.
- Sargent, Carl (1991). London Sourcebook. Shadowrun. ISBN 1-55560-131-6
- Sargent, Carl (1992). Castle Drachenfels. Warhammer: Games Workshop. ISBN 1-872379-32-X.
- Sargent, Carl (1989). King's Festival. B11. Mystara: TSR, inc. p. 32.
- Sargent, Carl (1991). Five Shall Be One. WGS1. World of Greyhawk: TSR, inc. p. 63. ISBN 1-56076-070-2. 9317xxx1501.
- Sargent, Carl (1993). The Marklands. WGR4. World of Greyhawk: TSR, inc. p. 95. ISBN 1-56076-559-3. 9398XXX1501.
- Sargent, Carl (1993). Iuz the Evil. WGR5. World of Greyhawk: TSR, inc. 9399.
- Sargent, Carl (1993). The City of Skulls. WGR6. World of Greyhawk: TSR, inc. p. 63. ISBN 1-56076-608-5. 9405XXX1501.
- Sargent, Carl (1995). Ivid the Undying. World of Greyhawk: TSR, Inc.
- Sargent, Carl; Thomas, Gary (1990). GAZ 13: The Shadow Elves. Mystara: TSR, Inc. ISBN 0-88038-846-3. 9287XXX1401.
- Sargent, Carl (1992). Monster Mythology. DMGR4. TSR, Inc. ISBN 1-56076-362-0.
- Sargent, Carl (1993). Legend of Zagor. Puffin Books. ISBN 0-14-036566-4. (credited to Ian Livingstone)
- Sargent, Carl (1995). Night Below: An Underdark Campaign. Box Set. TSR, Inc. ISBN 978-0786901791.

=== Role-playing publications as Keith Martin ===
- Martin, Keith (1988). Stealer of Souls. Puffin Books. ISBN 0-14-032658-8.
- Martin, Keith (1989). Vault of the Vampire. Puffin. ISBN 0-14-032877-7.
- Martin, Keith (1990). Master of Chaos. Puffin. ISBN 0-14-034010-6.
- Martin, Keith (1991). Tower of Destruction. Puffin. ISBN 0-14-034485-3.
- Martin, Keith (1992). Island of the Undead. Puffin. ISBN 0-14-036257-6.
- Martin, Keith (1993). Night Dragon. Puffin. ISBN 0-14-036407-2.
- Martin, Keith (1995). Revenge of the Vampire. Puffin. ISBN 0-14-037245-8.
