= Iuz the Evil =

Dungeons & Dragons supplement

- Code: WGR5
- TSR product code: 9399
- Rules required: 2nd Ed AD&D
- Character levels: N/A
- Campaign setting: Greyhawk
- Authors: Carl Sargent
- First published: 1993

Iuz the Evil is a sourcebook for the Dungeons & Dragons fantasy role-playing game for the game's World of Greyhawk campaign setting. The sourcebook bears the code WGR5 and was published by TSR in 1993 for the second edition Advanced Dungeons & Dragons rules.

== Contents ==
Iuz the Evil describes the realms of the evil demi-god Iuz. Iuz the Evil provides detailed information regarding the Empire of Iuz in the aftermath of the Greyhawk Wars.

== Publication history ==
The 96-page sourcebook was written by Carl Sargent. It features cover art by Jeff Easley and interior art by Eric Hotz. It was designed to supplement Sargent's From the Ashes boxed set for Greyhawk.

== Reception ==
John Setzer reviewed the module in a 1994 issue of White Wolf. He rated the game at 3 of 5 for Complexity, and a 4 for Appearance, Concepts, Playability, and Value. He gave it an overall rating of 4.
