= The Rod of Seven Parts =

1996 role-playing game accessory

- Genre: Role-playing games
- Publisher: TSR
- Publication date: 1996
- Media type: Boxed set
- ISBN: 0-7869-0418-6

The Rod of Seven Parts is a 1996 accessory for the 2nd edition of the Advanced Dungeons & Dragons fantasy role-playing game, written by Skip Williams. It focuses on the fictional artifact of the same name, which was originally introduced in the 1976 supplement Eldritch Wizardry. The boxed set details the rod's history and includes an adventure centered around finding its parts.

== Plot summary ==
The Rod of Seven Parts is a boxed set supplement which details the history of the Dawn of Time in which the forces of Law went to war with the forces of Chaos to control the Cosmos. This campaign saw its climax at the Battle of Pesh, where the armies of the Queen of Chaos led by Miska the Wolf-Spider faced the forces of Law led by the Vaati, or Wind Dukes. The Wind Dukes were hopelessly outnumbered so they constructed the powerful weapon called the Rod of Seven Parts, which could kill an opponent even as powerful as Miska with a single blow. The Battle of Pesh resulted in a draw, with neither Law nor Chaos able to declare a victory. The Wind Dukes lost most of their forces, but in the last moments of the battle their leader was able to use the Rod to strike a glancing blow on Miska, but instead of killing him it mortally wounded the Wolf-Spider and imprisoned him in the Abyss. The created a lasting balance between the forces in the multiverse that lasts until this day, with order and anarchy in a tense stand-off. The wielder of the Rod of Seven Parts holds the fate of the multiverse, as it has the power to slay or free Miska.

The Rod is so potent that normal forms of protection are not sufficient, so the Wind Dukes designed each individual section of the Rod so that they would scatter around the world whenever its full powers were used, such as when it struck Miska. Once the player characters obtain the first section of the Rod they will be committed to undertake a quest which all over their homeworld, and eventually leading them into the Abyss itself.

The third segment is in the possession of a clan of cloud giants at war with a dragon family. The character can join with the giants to fight the dragons to try to earn the Rod segment, or they can choose to join with the dragons against the giants and enter lair using polymorph magic as a disguise.

== Rod of Seven Parts ==
The Rod of Seven Parts is a 5-foot-long pole when whole. The command words for each piece are "Ruat," "Caelum," "Fiat," "Justitia," "Ecce," "Lex," and "Rex," which collectively make up a Latin phrase that translates into "Though chaos reign, let justice be done. Behold! Law is king." The artifact is described as singular, with creator Gary Gygax emphasizing that only one exists. The Eldritch Wizardry guidelines described each piece as having its own unique powers. In a gaming scenario, the more parts of the rod a user possessed, the more powerful each one of the seven parts became. The Rod was one of the first artifacts detailed for the Dungeons & Dragons game. The artifact was updated for AD&D 2nd and 3rd editions

The Rod of Seven Parts artifact first appeared in the 1976 TSR (Gygax & Blume) publication Eldritch Wizardry. It was the centerpiece of a story concerning a long-ago "great war" between characters known as Wind Dukes of Aaqa and the Queen of Chaos. At the time the artifact was in one piece, and was known as The Rod of Law. In the story, the Rod of Law was used in the Battle of Pesh to imprison the Queen's greatest general, a character known as Miska the Wolf-Spider, Prince of Demons. The rod was broken into seven fragments during this conflict, and the seven individual pieces were scattered across the world.

Game designer Ken Rolston has called the Rod "the greatest story". Fellow game designer Hal Barwood said the concept of a rod of many parts forms the basis for a process of "corporealizing and then atomizing" a game's story, where a single item is broken into pieces and the players are tasked with finding and assembling the parts.

The Rod of Seven Parts is one of the few artifacts to be given a detailed history and guide for any campaign world. An earlier adventure featuring the Rod appeared in an RPGA tournament adventure called "The 'Dwarven' Quest for the Rod of Seven Parts" by Frank Mentzer in 1982. The Rod of Seven Parts was also a featured item in a fantasy novel by Douglas Niles, titled The Rod of Seven Parts. The story deals with the return of the Rod and the forces of Chaos trying to keep it apart. This makes the Rod the only major Dungeons & Dragons magical artifact to be featured in its own stand alone product and a novel.

== Publication history ==
Strategic Simulations held a license for The Rod of Seven Parts adventure and planned to release a game in 1997. This game was never published.

== Reception ==
Trenton Webb reviewed The Rod of Seven Parts for Arcane magazine, rating it a 9 out of 10 overall. He commented that "The power and success of The Rod of Seven Parts campaign stems directly from the artefact itself" and states that the quest is "a big, character-killing task that's probably a bit too long for its own good, but one that's so fascinating it's well worth sticking with". Webb comments: "The success of The Rod of Seven Parts lies in its flexibility. With three starting points and three possible conclusions there's real scope for players to make their own decisions rather than scrabbling to satisfy a designer's conditions. Throughout each set-piece useful trouble-shooting guides crop up and alternative solutions are suggested to the ref. In essence, The Rod of Seven Parts guides the course of events rather than forcing the pace." He continues: "And so this relaxed approach encourages players through the adventures, but these are not the only carrots that this stick has to offer. There are glorious visual cue cards which will help the players to picture the locations and characters they meet perfectly. These are indicative of the extremely high standard of artwork throughout all three manuals and the vast number of maps, which underline the superior quality of the set."

Webb adds: "The weaknesses of The Rod are few and far between. There are a few annoying typographical errors [...] which trip up an otherwise highly readable manual. The only real problem, though, is the size - in all honesty, the campaign may just be too big for one party to play through." He continues: "However, The Rod of Seven Parts is a very persuasive adventure because it addresses the fraught issue of heroic power. Potent artefacts have a way of finding themselves powerful guardians, so parties are going to have to tackle some major league nasties if they are to ensure its safe assembly. Yet these aren't just monsters that have been dropped in to crank up the combat, but well-rounded NPCs with an agenda of their own. If players keep their ears open and their brains in gear it should become obvious how to reclaim the next section without the need for a fight, or, if it comes to blows, the best way to tip the balance in their favour. It's this ability to turn no-win scenarios into victories that separates heroes from hardmen, and it's what drives the Rod campaign." Regarding the choice between siding with either the dragons or the giants, Webb said "The chances of even a tough party beating either group in a battle are pretty slim, and their chances of victory over both together are nonexistent. So players are forced to muster up their courage and attempt to survive this vicious intrigue long enough to spot and steal the segment. [...] And stepping into a Cloud Giant Castle which you know could well come under serious Dragon attack at any second is a great gulp moment, regardless of how hard you reckon you are!"

== Reviews ==
- Casus Belli #121
