= Erik Mona =

American game designer

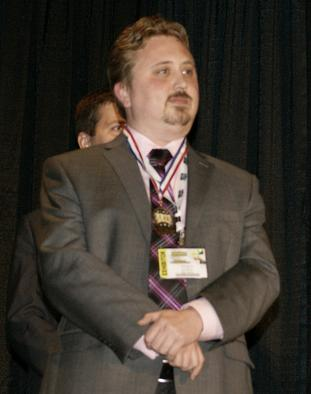
- Erik Mona on August 5, 2011 at the Gen Con Ennies awards show
- Born: Erik Mona; April 1974 (age 52); Minnesota
- Occupation: Game designer
- Writing career
- Genre: Role-playing games

Erik Mona (born April 1974) is an American game designer who lives in Seattle, Washington.

== Career ==
Mona was the Managing Editor of issues 1 and 2 of the Oerth Journal, an online publication devoted to the World of Greyhawk campaign setting, and the Editor-in-Chief from issues 2–7. Mona had the opportunity to talk to designers like Robert Kuntz on the GreyTalk mailing list in 1990s, where Kuntz shared stories of the early days of the Greyhawk campaigns.

Mona became the head publisher of Paizo in April 2006. Mona served as the editor-in-chief of the Dungeons & Dragons role-playing game magazines Dragon beginning in 2004 and Dungeon from 2004 to 2006; at the time, both magazines were published by Paizo until the license through Wizards of the Coast expired in September 2007. Mona and other editors at Paizo were fans of Greyhawk, and thus featured the setting in Dragon and Dungeon magazines while Paizo was publishing the magazines.

He has edited, authored, and co-authored several products for D&D, including the Living Greyhawk Gazetteer, Faiths and Pantheons, Fiendish Codex I: Hordes of the Abyss, Expedition to the Ruins of Greyhawk (a "solid hit")), Pathfinder Chronicles Campaign Setting, and Armies of the Abyss. He maintained a blog called Lemuria Press, and made his last post on Lemuria Press on December 25, 2012.
