= Return of the Eight =

Dungeons & Dragons adventure module

- Rules required: 2nd Ed AD&D
- Character levels: 6 - 12
- Campaign setting: Greyhawk
- Authors: Roger E. Moore
- First published: 1998

Return of the Eight is an adventure module for the Dungeons & Dragons fantasy roleplaying game, set in the game's World of Greyhawk campaign setting. The module was published by Wizards of the Coast in 1998 under its recently acquired "TSR" imprint for the second edition Advanced Dungeons & Dragons rules.

The 64-page module was written by Roger E. Moore and involves several iconic Greyhawk figures and legends, such as Tenser the Archmage.

== Plot summary ==
An enemy of the Circle of Eight, "a group of powerful magicians dedicated to preserving the balance between good and evil", has captured one of the Circle's members, Jallarzi Sallavarian. The player characters become embroiled in the Circle's machinations as they try to rescue her. The characters move from the shantytowns of Greyhawk City, to the fortress-tower of the archmage Tenser, a member of the Circle of Eight who was slain some years ago. The characters will ultimately uncover a conspiracy which threatens the world.

== Publication history ==
Return of the Eight was the first publication in a series of new material, after TSR restarted the Greyhawk line. It was published in May 1998.

== Reception ==
James MacDuff reviewed Return of the Eight in 1998, in Shadis #50. MacDuff was critical of the book's approach, in that the writing assumes that the players are already familiar with the Greyhawk setting, and that it does little to integrate those unfamiliar with the material. He did appreciate the adventure's difficulty, calling it "wickedly dangerous, designed only for high level characters who can think on their feet". MacDuff also noted that the author, Roger Moore - a long-time writer for TSR - took steps to foil the "Monty Haul" tactics of some players. He felt that the adventure can be overwhelming at times: "The dungeons here are truly lethal, and require both power and an old-school tunnel-crawling mentality to succeed. The module lists optimum character levels at 6-12, but I can't imagine any PC lower than 10th level taking it on." MacDuff complained that the book contained little information for fans unfamiliar with the Greyhawk setting, and that Moore "always assumes that his readers are familiar with the characters and situations he describes," and therefore players new to the setting "should look elsewhere to get a proper introduction, and leave Return of the Eight to long-time players already familiar with Greyhawk". MacDuff did find a lot to like about the adventure, however, particularly its epic scope, well developed characters, and challenging dungeons, concluding the review by saying "As a fast and dirty way to ramrod players back into the setting, it's both effective and enjoyable. Just make sure your characters can roll with the punches."

== Reviews ==
- Envoyer #22
