= Ken Frank =

Artist

Kenneth Carl Frank Sr. is an artist whose work has appeared in role-playing games.

== Works ==
Ken Frank produced interior illustrations for many Dungeons & Dragons books and Dragon magazine throughout the 1990s, as well as cover art for the adventure modules Flames of the Falcon and Falconmaster (1990). He also did artwork for the Spellfire card game and the Dragon Dice collectible dice game.

He has also produced artwork for games from other companies, including Traveller (Game Designers' Workshop).
