= Intellect devourer =

Dungeons & Dragons monster

- First appearance: Eldritch Wizardry (1976)

In the Dungeons & Dragons fantasy roleplaying game, the intellect devourer is a type of fictional monster.

== Publication history ==
The intellect devourer first appeared in the original Dungeons & Dragons game supplement Eldritch Wizardry (1976).

The intellect devourer appeared in first edition Advanced Dungeons & Dragons in the original Monster Manual (1977). The ustilagor first appeared in Dragon #69 (January 1983), and then reprinted in the original Monster Manual II (1983).

The intellect devourer and the intellect devourer larva (ustilagor) appeared in second edition in The Complete Psionics Handbook (1991), and reprinted in the Monstrous Manual (1993).

The intellect devourer appeared in third edition in the Psionics Handbook, and its 3.5 revision the Expanded Psionics Handbook (2004). The battle intellect devourer appeared in Dragon #303 (January 2003). The ustilagor appeared in Dragon #337 (November 2005).

The intellect devourer and ustilagor appeared in the fourth edition in Monster Manual 3 (2010).

Intellect devourers also appear in the fifth edition Monster Manual as well.

== Description ==
Intellect devourers are described as chaotic and evil monsters, malevolent towards sentient life. They are said to dwell deep beneath the ground, and subsist on the psychic energy of their prey. They are generally described as servants of the mind flayers. Their alignment is lawful evil in 5th Edition.

== Other media ==
Intellect devourers appear in the film Dungeons & Dragons: Honor Among Thieves.

== Reception ==
SyFy Wire in 2018 called it one of "The 9 Scariest, Most Unforgettable Monsters From Dungeons & Dragons", saying that "The idea of having your brain consumed and just becoming an evil puppet is truly terrible."

Rob Bricken for Gizmodo commented that "If you read the description, they're quite deadly, but what I love is that they're just giant brains on legs, which is to say they look like what they eat. Imagine if humans looked like full roast chickens on legs. It's fun!"
