= Githyanki =

Fictional race from Dungeons & Dragons

- Githyanki as shown in the Fiend Folio.
- First appearance: White Dwarf #12 (April/May 1979)

In-universe information
- Type: Humanoid
- Alignment: Almost always any evil

The githyanki (gith-YAN-kee) are a fictional humanoid race in the Dungeons & Dragons fantasy role-playing game. They are cousins and ancient enemies to the githzerai. In the Dark Sun setting, they are simply called gith.

Introduced by Charles Stross in White Dwarf #12, githyanki were officially included in the game in Fiend Folio (1981) and featured on its cover.

== Background ==
Charles Stross originally created the githyanki for a Dungeons & Dragons game with multiple Dungeon Masters "where everyone was creating new monsters to offset" that all of them "had access to the Monster Manual". Stross then submitted the race to Games Workshop's magazine White Dwarf. Content submitted to the magazine's "Fiend Factory" column was collected and published by TSR in the first edition Fiend Folio (1981) for Advanced Dungeons & Dragons (AD&D). In 2003, Erik Mona wrote that Stross "left D&D about the time he went to university, totally unaware of the impact his creatures would have on D&D fans". On the creation of the githyanki, Stross explained that he "wanted a whole civilization that made some sort of sense" after seeing the Underdark drow civilization as well as "getting interested in the psionics rules at the time" so "designing a monster type suitable for that kind of campaign made sense".

Stross borrowed the name from a fictional race created by George R. R. Martin in his 1977 science fiction novel Dying of the Light. The master/slave aspect of the githyanki/illithid relationship was inspired by Larry Niven's World of Ptavvs (1966), "while their relationship with red dragons recalls Michael Moorcock's Melnibonéans (1961+)". Stross stated he was "a bit of a magpie when designing monsters". George R. R. Martin himself was not aware that the name had been borrowed until a fan and D&D player informed him after a public reading in 1983.

The githyanki is considered a "Product Identity" by Wizards of the Coast and as such is not released under its Open Gaming License. The githyanki have appeared in all editions of the Dungeons & Dragons fantasy role-playing game since AD&D.

=== Martin's githyanki ===
In Martin's novel, the githyanki were called "soulsucks" because of their dangerous psychic powers. They were slaves of another alien race called the hrangans, and were used by them in their long space wars with humanity. Unlike the D&D race, they were barely sapient. No githyanki actually appear in Dying of the Light, as the book takes place after the war between the humans and the hrangans is long over, and the soulsucks are nearly extinct. There is also passing reference to them in Martin's short-story collection Tuf Voyaging and the short story "Nightflyers".

== Publication history ==
=== Advanced Dungeons & Dragons 1st edition (1977–1988) ===
The githyanki was first published in White Dwarf #12 (April/May 1979), in the "Fiend Factory" column. In White Dwarf #15 readers were asked to vote for their top ten "Fiend Factory" monsters. The top ten, including the githyanki, were later reprinted in Best of White Dwarf Articles (1980). The githyanki then appeared in 1981 in the first edition Fiend Folio and were featured on the book's cover.

The module Tales of the Outer Planes (1988) describes a githyanki lair.

=== Advanced Dungeons & Dragons 2nd edition (1989–1999) ===
The githyanki appears first in the Monstrous Compendium Outer Planes Appendix (1991), which also included the g"lathk githyanki, the hr'a'cknir githyanki, and the mlar githyanki. The githyanki and these variants are reprinted in the Monstrous Manual (1993).

The githyanki was further detailed in the first Planescape Monstrous Compendium Appendix (1994). Githyanki society and their Astral cities are further developed, and their leader Vlaakith the Lich-Queen are described in A Guide to the Astral Plane (1996).

=== Dungeons & Dragons 3.0 edition (2000–2002) ===
The githyanki first appears in the Psionics Handbook (2001), and then in this edition's Manual of the Planes (2001).

=== Dungeons & Dragons 3.5 edition (2003–2008) ===
The githyanki appears in the revised Monster Manual for this edition (2003), and was further detailed in the Expanded Psionics Handbook (2004) (along with the psionic githyanki) and the Complete Psionic (2006).

The "Incursion" storyline running through July 2003's Dragon #309 and Dungeon #100/Polyhedron #159 (Note: While Polyhedron was merged with the sister publication Dungeon to form a single magazine in 2002, dual numbering continued until 2004.) focused on the githyanki heavily. Paizo Publishing, which held the license to publish the various official Dungeons & Dragons magazines, "used material originally intended for Dungeon to create their first commercial PDF: Chris Perkins' Tu'narath City Guide (2003)". This guide to the githyanki capital city was a supplement for the Dungeon #100 adventure "The Lich Queen's Beloved". Dungeon #100 also included the duthka'gith, the kr'y'izoth template, the tl'a'ikith template, and Vlaakith the Lich-Queen.

The githyanki captain, the gish githyanki, and the githyanki soldier appeared in Monster Manual IV (2006).

=== Dungeons & Dragons 4th edition (2008–2014) ===
The githyanki was initially featured in the 4th Edition preview book Worlds and Monsters (2008). The githyanki then appear in the Monster Manual for this edition (2008), including the githyanki warrior, the githyanki mindslicer, and the githyanki gish. The githyanki and the githzerai also appear in the supplements Manual of the Planes (2008) and The Plane Above: Secrets of the Astral Sea (2010). A conversion of "The Lich Queen's Beloved" from Dungeon #100 was released in Dungeon #191 (June 2011).

=== Dungeons & Dragons 5th edition (2014–present) ===
Both the githyanki and the githzerai were included in the 5th Edition Monster Manual (2014). The gith as playable races were introduced in a 2017 Unearthed Arcana playtest. The githyanki then return to Dungeons & Dragons as a playable race alongside the githzerai in the expansion Mordenkainen's Tome of Foes (2018). As part of this release, the githyanki and the githzerai were featured in the introductory adventure Rrakkma (2018) released for the D&D Adventurers League. The githyanki were also featured in Dragon+ #19 (April 2018), which included a 5th Edition update of Vlaakith.

The githyanki and the githzerai playable races were then revised in the supplement Mordenkainen Presents: Monsters of the Multiverse (2022). The githyanki buccaneer, githyanki star seer and the githyanki xenomancer were included in the Spelljammer: Adventures in Space (2022) bestiary.

Both the githyanki and the githzerai were updated in the Monster Manual (2025) released for the revised 5th Edition; both were classified as "aberrations" for the first time.

== Fictional history ==
Long ago, before many of the worlds known in the present day were born, the illithids ruled a vast empire known to some as Nihilath. The illithid empire held many worlds and even a few planes of existence in their tentacled grip. After a thousand years of engineering, they constructed an artificial world known as Penumbra, a vast disk that circled a sun, the planet's radius something like a hundred million miles.

The empire kept slaves. According to Polyhedron #159, many of the slaves had originated on a distant world known as Pharagos, which the illithids had conquered and added to their empire. The article "Exiles from the Vault" from Dragon #298 (2002) mention a subterranean empire called Zarum in Western Oerik, where a race of humanoids dominated many other races from their capital city of Anithor. These humanoids seem to have been divided into a rigid caste system, their lives ruled by ancient ritual. The ruins of Zarum overflow with sacred spaces and temples, though the names of their ancient gods are unknown today. At some point, the illithids invaded Zarum from a neighboring plane of existence. Though the natives fought fiercely, they were no match for the psionic might of the mind flayers, and soon they were enslaved. The River of Angry Souls is a remnant of one of the terrible battles between the illithids and the soon-to-be enslaved Zarumites. Many were brought to the Outer Planes and elsewhere to serve as illithid slaves. Other cities in Zarum were transformed into work pits where illithid overseers forced their slaves to toil for countless generations. For thousands of years these once-human beings, who are remembered today only as the forerunners, were thralls of Nihilath. Some were engineered to become the ancestors of the grimlocks and distributed throughout the worlds of the empire to serve their illithid masters in their subterranean realms. On every world, the slaves were unable to escape their masters' psionic power, and illithid might was unquestioned. It is said that the fiends paused in their eternal Blood War to determine if anything could stop the mind flayers as the empire expanded throughout the Astral Plane and Ethereal Plane and threatened the Outer Planes themselves.

It was then that the illithids first encounted the voor. The voor were one of the greatest threats the illithid empire ever faced. An insectoid race utterly immune to psionics, the voor reproduced using spores capable of floating through the airless reaches of outer space indefinitely before finding a place to transform into larvae, using whatever inorganic materials were on hand to create their bodies. The standard slave armies of the illithids were unable to stop the voor invasion, so in desperation a long-vanished illithid Creed constructed tumerogenesis tanks to impart certain physical, spiritual, and psionic enhancements on selected slave-soldiers. After thousands of years of slavery and controlled breeding, the illithid thralls were no longer recognizable as the humans they once were. They were longer of limb, with skin the tawny color of old ivory and slightly pointed ears.

After the long war between the illithids and voor ended, the voor all but extinct thanks to the efforts of these new modified battle-thralls, the balance of power in the illithid empire changed. The thralls were now battle-hardened and had become increasingly psionically adept. The illithids became more brutal in order to ensure their slaves remained obedient, which only invited more revolts and more brutal reprisals.

Then came Gith. Some say she was the personal bodyguard of a powerful illithid noble, while others claim she was only a lowly foot soldier and little more than a child. But her mental and physical powers were great, and her rage, hatred, power, and charisma was sufficient to guide the thralls to victory. The illithid empire was shattered by the slave rebellion (remembered by them as the Thrall Uprising). Not every illithid stronghold fell, but the ties that bound the empire together were broken, and even today the mind flayers have not recovered from that ancient war. They hid themselves away in the Underdarks of countless worlds, vowing to rebuild their strength and take vengeance against their treacherous former slaves, something they have not managed to do.

Having won the war, Gith continued to treat her people (who would become known as the githyanki, a word meaning "children of Gith") as a conquering army rather than a free people. Having just won a war, she prepared to launch a new one, an Eternal Crusade that would exterminate every last illithid once and for all.

While some githyanki were comforted by Gith's military discipline, others chafed against it. One leader, Zerthimon, was the most vocal of the dissidents. He claimed that Gith would replace the illithid tyranny with her own, and that though she had been successful in the past as a leader of war, she was unfit to lead the People in peace. He called for her to step down. Gith refused, but Zerthimon and his followers would not allow themselves to be ruled by a new tyrant. Having just won a war, now a civil war began among the githyanki, with Zerthimon's followers battling Gith's. During the civil war, an already wounded world was reduced to an uninhabited cinder.

What happened to Zerthimon is a matter of dispute. Some (A Guide to the Astral Plane) say Zerthimon was killed, while others (The Plane Below) say he defeated Gith in single combat, but chose to spare her life. Regardless, the followers of Zerthimon—now known as the githzerai, or "those who spurn Gith"—retreated to Limbo. Meanwhile, the losses the githyanki sustained in their war were too great for Gith to continue her crusade, so they retreated to the conquered illithid settlements on the Astral Plane to rebuild their numbers to the point when they could exterminate both the illithids and the githzerai.

Soon after, a wizard called Vlaakith began advising Gith in matters of state. It was Vlaakith who advised Gith to find allies to help their diminished people survive. When no god would treat with her and negotiations with the chaotic slaadi failed, she traveled to the Nine Hells, where she spent time negotiating with the archdevil Dispater. Dispater's price, however—the souls of all githyanki—was too high for her to contemplate. Dispater had other ways of manipulating those foolish enough to bargain with him, however, and he suggested she meet with Ephelomon, the red dragon consort of Tiamat, to see if she could make a bargain with the Dragon Queen similar to the bargain between Tiamat and the Hells that permitted the devils to borrow Tiamat's abishai. With all other possibilities of alliance having failed, Gith traveled to Tiamat's realm. There, Ephelomon agreed to send a wing of red dragons for the githyanki to ride in exchange for the aid of the githyanki whenever Tiamat required it. Dispater suggested that a hostage would be required to seal the deal, so Gith agreed to become Dispater's prisoner in his iron city of Dis, thereby giving Dispater the soul of one of the greatest rebel leaders who ever lived. Ephelomon came to the Astral Plane alone and gave Vlaakith, whom Gith had designated her successor, a magical scepter that symbolized the Dragon Queen's acceptance of the pact.

Vlaakith continued to rule as queen of the githyanki, and after her death her scepter passed to Vlaakith II, and thence to Vlaakith III, and so on until the reign of the current queen, Vlaakith CLVII. With a total of 157 queens since the illithid rebellion, a long time must have passed (according to the Forgotten Realms novel Dawn of Night, it has been approximately 10,000 years, though some sources imply the time has been longer or shorter). The githyanki have become somewhat fragmented, forming isolated groups instead of a single nation. Though they almost all ultimately serve their revered Lich-Queen, each group has their own separate goals as well.

Githyanki played a significant part in the recent Priestess Wars in the city of Erelhei-Cinlu, allying with the drow house of Tormtor against their rivals, the Kilsek, who had allied themselves with the illithids.

=== 4th edition ===
In 4th edition, the Githyanki sail in the shadows of the gods and devils in the Astral Sea, while the Githzerai built their monasteries as islands of calm in the tumult of the Elemental Chaos.

== Fictional society ==
Githyanki society is xenophobic and martial, with both males and females training heavily in magic and sword fighting. Although they are loyal to each other, they are also fiercely individualistic. Raiding illithid strongholds is considered a rite of passage.

The current queen, Vlaakith CLVII, is an undead wizard who has ruled her people for more than a thousand years. She is so paranoid that when any githyanki achieves a certain level of power and skill, she summons them to her palace to consume their souls, thus preventing them from ever threatening her power. Most githyanki willingly present themselves out of blind loyalty and pride, whilst those who try to flee this fate are hunted down and dragged before her in shackles. These victims afterwards become some form of undead servant under her direct control.

Vlaakith will sometimes present powerful githyanki with an incredibly rare silver sword. These swords possess several unique properties, most notably the ability to sever the silver cords that act as lifelines to travelers on the astral plane, killing the traveler instantly. These swords are highly sought after, and a cult of githyanki knights called the Sword Stalkers is tasked with recovering any swords that fall into the hands of the unworthy, namely non-githyanki.

The githyanki use a unique form of writing called tir'su. It is an alphabetical set of runes in which words are formed in circles instead of linearly, with the letters of a given word being linked around a ring clockwise from the top. Sentences are formed from a series of these rings. Much as runes were given a mystical significance, the Githyanki employ the tir'su when creating magical wards and symbols.

=== Religion ===
The worship of gods is forbidden in githyanki society. Their lack of piety is further demonstrated by the fact that they often make their homes on the floating, stonelike corpses of dead gods drifting in the Astral Plane.

=== Language ===
Githyanki have their own language, much like that of their cousins the githzerai, commonly known as Gith. They also speak the Common language, and many speak Draconic. In the githyanki language, apostrophes (which are not pronounced) separate different morphemes which have been combined into a single word. For example, gish'sarath combines the word gish, or "skilled," with sarath, or "sergeant." Githyanki who have trained with great heroes add the prefix gi' ("student of") to their trainer's name.

=== Ecology ===
Unlike their mammalian ancestors, githyanki reproduce by laying eggs. Because biological processes temporarily stop for those on the Astral, the githyanki must travel to other planes to breed, normally the Prime Material Plane.

Githyanki are considered to be native to the Astral Plane, though their distant ancestors were humans from the Material Plane. Their fortress-cities are built on chunks of Astral stone or on the titanic stony corpses of dead gods. They have fortress-outposts on many planes and Material Planar worlds, especially near illithid lairs, as well as brood-chambers to incubate their eggs.

=== Typical physical characteristics ===
Githyanki are vaguely similar to humans in appearance, but taller and much gaunter, averaging six feet, three inches tall and weighing an average of 170 pounds. They have fangs, leathery, pale yellow skin, and red or black hair. Their black eyes are sunken in their skulls, and their ears are pointed and serrated in back.

=== Alignment ===
Githyanki are almost always evil, though they can be chaotic, neutral, or lawful. Non-evil githyanki are one-in-a-million exceptions, and good githyanki are unheard of.

== Reception ==
The githyanki were voted among the top ten best monsters from that White Dwarf's "Fiend Factory" column. Shannon Appelcline considered the githyanki one of the game's especially notable monsters. Appelcline argued that of Charles Stross's Fiend Folio contributions only the "githyanki, the githzerai, and the slaad have become 3 of the 11 protected monsters in the Product Identity of Wizards of the Coast's d20 SRD, suggesting that they're some of the most well-recognized and (mostly) original monsters in the world of D&D".

Trenton Webb for Arcane magazine comments that in A Guide to the Astral Plane, "The mid-section of the guide's response is more information than even an Illithid would want on the Githyanki – the indigenous species on the Astral. Such depth is necessary because it's suggested as an optional player race, but while as non-player characters the Githyanki boast some excellent twists and Astral-specific spells, as PCs they would be little more than dextrous, not to mention ugly, egg layers."

ComicBook.com contributor Christian Hoffer considered "the conflict between the otherworldly githzerai and githyanki" one "of the great conflicts that make up the D&D multiverse", and praised the expanded lore presented in Mordenkainen's Tome of Foes as "certainly useful as both inspiration and as research material for building a D&D campaign." Scott Baird of TheGamer commented on the nature of the relationship of the githyanki to the mind flayers: "Despite their wicked reputation, the Githyanki have an important role to play in protecting the Prime Material Plane. The Githyanki despise Mind Flayers and their armies might be the only thing holding them back. The trailer for Baldur's Gate 3 shows just how scary a single Mind Flayer ship can be, and that could happen a thousand times over if the Githyanki aren't around."

== Other media ==
Githyanki were featured in the official campaign for the licensed Neverwinter Nights 2 computer game and in Baldur's Gate II.
