= A Darkness Gathering =

1998 adventure for Advanced Dungeons & Draongs

A Gathering Darkness
- Cover art by Matt Wilson
- Designers: Bruce Cordell
- Illustrators: Matt Wilson; Glen Michael Angus
- Publishers: TSR
- Publication: 1998
- Genres: fantasy role-playing game
- Systems: Advanced Dungeons & Dragons, 2nd edition
- Players: 6 plus gamemaster

A Darkness Gathering is an adventure published by TSR in 1998 for the second edition of the fantasy role-playing game Advanced Dungeons & Dragons (AD&D) that was the first part of the Illithid Trilogy. Critics found the adventure to be too linear and predictable.

== Contents ==
A Darkness Gathering is a mid-level AD&D scenario for a party of 6 characters of 7th to 9th level, and is the first of three sequential adventures in the Illithiad Trilogy.

Evil harbingers have appeared: An unusually harsh winter has been followed by an equally cold spring that threatens to decimate the summer crops. Daylight seems dimmer, and stars have disappeared from the night sky. A sage in the city of Stormport predicts the end of the world. The adventurers are in Stormport to meet a friend, but she fails to show up at the appointed time. She is not the first to disappear recently, and soon the adventurers are tangled in an investigation that will take them to the town's sewers, the sage's tower, the thieves' guild and the city guard. This ultimately leads to a confrontation with Shuluth, a mind flayer, which uncovers the larger plot that there is a deep threat to the entire world by illithids.

== Publication history ==
In 1998, TSR published The Illithiad, a large AD&D supplement about illithids designed by Bruce Cordell. To drive sales of this book, TSR also simultaneously released a trilogy of adventures based on The Illithiad's content. The first of these was A Darkness Gathering, a 32-page scenario created by Cordell, with cover art by Matt Wilson and interior art by Glen Michael Angus. The other two scenarios in the trilogy are Master of Eternal Night and Dawn of the Overmind.

== Reception ==
In Issue 11 of the French games magazine Backstab, Michaël Croitoriu sarcastically called this adventure one of "boundless originality, a variation of 'let's go free the princess'." Croitoriu found the adventure relentlessly linear, and utterly predictable. Croitoriu concluded by giving this adventure the lowest rating of only 1 out of 10, writing,"In the end, even with a lot of good will, I see no reason to buy this scenario. Here's hoping that the editors will spare your servant the sequel."

The German game magazine Envoyer also found the adventure to be too predictable, commenting, "As expected, this is a heavily combat-focused adventure in which the characteristics and gimmicks of the mind flayers are shown. The format follows the classic style: find and destroy enemies, and then use the information gathered to tackle the next obstacle." Overall, Envoyer found "It is a poor scenario unless you are a fan of combat adventures." The conclusion was that A Darkness Gathering was "Not exactly a highlight of AD&D adventures, as the special atmosphere that has distinguished many other combat adventures is missing."
