= Epic Level Handbook =

Dungeons & Dragons supplement

- Epic Level Handbook for D&D v3.
- Author: Andy Collins and Bruce R. Cordell
- Genre: Role-playing game
- Publisher: Wizards of the Coast
- Publication date: July 2002
- Media type: Print (Hardback)
- Pages: 320
- ISBN: 0-7869-2658-9

The Epic Level Handbook is a rule-book by Wizards of the Coast for the 3rd edition of Dungeons & Dragons. The book was published in July 2002, and contains optional game rules for playing characters who have reached a higher experience level than is covered in the standard rules. This is referred to in the book as "epic level" play.

== Contents ==
The Epic Level Handbook contains rules for characters to attain levels above 20, the highest level covered by the rules in the Player's Handbook and Dungeon Master's Guide, the core rule-books for the game. It provides epic-level progression information for all the core classes, the prestige classes from the Dungeon Master's Guide, and the psionic classes from the Psionics Handbook. It also provides new epic-level prestige classes, magical items, variant rules, monsters and "Epic Spells", all of which follow somewhat different rules than the standard game. The variant rules for this book are contained on pages 110–111, which include Open-Ended Rolls; Death from Massive Damage (change with a new feat option as well); Extended "Death's Door" (adds your character level * −1 onto your Dying HP when above level 20); Spell Resistance for Time Stop; NPC Challenge Ratings (Fix for Epic Levels); Epic Luck (1 per day reroll of a roll); and the Three Deaths and You're Out variant rules are all contained.

== Publication history ==
The Epic Level Handbook was designed by Andy Collins and Bruce R. Cordell, and published in July 2002. The cover art is by Arnie Swekel, with interior art by Daren Bader, Brom, David Day, Brian Despain, Larry Dixon, Michael Dutton, Jeff Easley, Lars Grant-West, Rebecca Guay, Jeremy Jarvis, Alton Lawson, Todd Lockwood, David Martin, Raven Mimura, Matthew Mitchell, Vinod Rams, Wayne Reynolds, Darrell Riche, Richard Sardinha, Marc Sasso, Mark Smylie, Arnie Swekel, and Anthony Waters.

Collins was the first designer scheduled for the book, and handled the core of the rules, while Cordell handled the epic spellcasting and epic monsters.

The book was updated for the 3.5 edition via an update document available from the Wizards of the Coast website.

The 4th Edition covers this in an alternate manner with continuous 1-30 level progress. Wizards of the Coast covered the topic in their 2009 conference.

== Reception ==
The reviewer from Pyramid commented that before the Epic Level Handbook, the third edition did not make it easy to play powerful characters, especially compared to prior editions. Another reviewer commented that the book "addresses how to keep the Dungeons & Dragons system functioning after 20th level. Due to the nature of the system, many conventions of the system such as save and attack bonus conventions do not work as well if extrapolated out past 20th level."

James Voelpel from mania.com commented: "A landmark book from Wizards of the Coast, the Epic Level Handbook not only helps dungeon masters run high level games but encourages smart players to strive for it's [sic] unlimited greatness."

Viktor Coble listed Epic Level Handbook as #6 on CBR's 2021 "D&D: 10 Best Supplemental Handbooks" list, stating that "It offers a wide scope of ways to engage extremely powerful characters and build them, and it even gives options beyond experience points for progressing and growing the characters. It helps scale the world around these outrageously strong characters and can even be used to help curb some munchkin behavior."

== Reviews ==
- Dragon Slayer
- Dragão Brasil
- Dragão Brasil
