= Return to the Tomb of Horrors =

Dungeons & Dragons adventure module

- Rules required: 2nd Ed AD&D
- Character levels: 13 - 16
- Campaign setting: Greyhawk
- Authors: Bruce R. Cordell
- First published: 1998
- ISBN: 0-7869-0732-0

Linked modules
- S1; Return to the Tomb of Horrors

Return to the Tomb of Horrors is a boxed set adventure module for the Advanced Dungeons & Dragons role-playing game released in 1998 by TSR, Inc.

== Plot summary ==
This module expanded significantly upon the plot of the original Tomb of Horrors, revealing that the tomb of the first adventure was merely an antechamber to the lich Acererak's true resting place, and the demilich "slain" in the first adventure was both decoy and key to proceeding further. The dust from the destroyed skull opened a way to the cursed city of Moil in a pocket universe of eternal darkness and ice, and beyond that to Acererak's fortress hovering at the edge of the Negative Energy Plane itself.

Acererak is revealed in this publication to be near the completion of a multi-thousand-year project to achieve godhood, powered by souls consumed over the years. He now needs only three additional souls to complete the process, but they must be of exceptional purity and strength; to this end he constructed his tomb to serve as an ultimate challenge for heroes, hoping to winnow out all but the very best. He would then consume them when they reached the center of his fortress, where his own undead essence resides in his phylactery. If the player characters fail to defeat Acererak in the course of the adventure they themselves could wind up serving in this role.

== Publication history ==
Return to the Tomb of Horrors is set in the World of Greyhawk campaign setting and is a sequel to Gary Gygax's 1978 module Tomb of Horrors. Part of TSR's "Tomes" series for AD&D, the boxed set included a reproduction of the monochrome version of Tomb of Horrors, along with an introductory note by Gygax. The new materials for the boxed set were authored by Bruce R. Cordell. Illustrations for the main adventure book were by Arnie Swekel and Glen Michael Angus, with illustrations by Swekel and Phillip Robb in the "Maps & Monsters Book".

In addition to the reprint of Tomb of Horrors, the box set included a 160-page campaign and setting book, a booklet of monsters, color maps, and a book with illustrations.

== Reception ==
Gary Gygax contributed a preface to the adventure, and although he was initially apprehensive that he wouldn't be able to offer "much in the way of a rave," he was pleased after he read the sequel: "The new material is really excellent. Return is a whole mini-campaign, not some rehash of previous work ... It offers more by far than the old Tomb of Horrors, and it is more deadly too."

Return to the Tomb of Horrors was ranked as the tenth greatest Dungeons & Dragons adventure of all time by Dungeon magazine in 2004, on the 30th anniversary of the Dungeons & Dragons game.

Return to the Tomb of Horrors won the 1998 Origins Award for Best Roleplaying Adventure.

== Reviews ==
- SF Site
- Backstab #11
- Backstab #21
- Realms of Fantasy
