= Faiths and Pantheons =

2002 tabletop role-playing game supplement

- Author: Boyd, Eric L. and Mona, Erik
- Illustrator: Angus, Glen et al.
- Cover artist: Brom
- Genre: Role-playing game
- Publisher: Wizards of the Coast
- Publication date: May 2002
- Media type: Print (Hardcover)
- Pages: 224
- ISBN: 0-7869-2759-3
- OCLC: 50217284

Faiths and Pantheons is a campaign accessory for the 3rd edition of the Dungeons & Dragons, for the Forgotten Realms campaign setting.

== Contents ==
Faiths and Pantheons details the mechanics of the system established at the end of the Time of Troubles, in which a divine figure's relative power would be determined by the number of their worshipers.

Faiths and Pantheons also features the power levels and exact abilities of the various major deities of Faerûn (those with divine rank 15+), as of 3rd Edition, and has descriptions of the dogmas and churches of all of the intermediate deities, lesser deities, and demigods named in the setting's core rulebook. It even features the names of various monster deities and others unmentioned in the core book, with descriptions of some, as well as 20 prestige classes for player characters and non-player characters alike.

== Publication history ==
This book was written by Eric L. Boyd and Erik Mona and published in May 2002. Cover art is by Brom, with interior art by Glen Angus, Carlo Arellano, Brom, Dennis Calero, Michael Dubisch, Wayne England, Mark Evans, Scott Fischer, Lars Grant-West, Michael W. Kaluta, Vince Locke, Todd Lockwood, Raven Mimura, Puddnhead, Corey Macourek, Stephanie Pui-Mun Law, Wayne Reynolds, Mike Sass, Mark Smylie, Arnie Swekel, Ben Templesmith, Kev Walker, Matt Wilson, Renick Woods, and Sam Wood.

Erik Mona commented on the book's design: "The new design ethic was to focus on building the Realms into an interesting campaign setting for players and DMs, above and beyond an adherence to old material so far out of date a modern-day graduate student could have been in grade school when it first went out of print. So I did my best to infuse deities like Deneir, Selune, and even poor little Cyrrollalee with interesting, occasionally challenging ideas that they hadn't been exposed to in the long history of the Realms. When ground has been covered eleven times before, it's really tempting to just parrot older material, changing the exact wording but not worrying too much about updating the gears that make that material work. For Faiths and Pantheons, I tried to tear some of these gods (particularly some of the lamer ones) to their core concepts and build up from there. That's not to say they're so different as to be unrecognizable--they're the same deities, but some of them have new, hopefully interesting aspects to their characters and motivations that haven't been revealed until now."

== Reception ==
Faiths and Pantheons received generally positive reviews. Online magazine Fictional Reality considered the interior artwork to stand out, and found both the mechanics and setting information useful, although concluded that it was "not a required book" for play. Reviewing a 2007 German edition, Anduin also praised the book's layout and setting information; the translated edition was considered especially beneficial to German players, because 2nd edition books with similar content (such as Faiths & Avatars and Demihuman Deities) were only released in English. However, the detailed mechanical stat blocks for major deities were viewed as largely unsuccessful.

== Reviews ==
- Backstab #43 (as "Dogmes et panthéons")
- Dragão Brasil
- Dragão Brasil
