= Monster Manual II =

1983 rulebooks by Gary Gygax

- First edition Monster Manual II
- Author: Gary Gygax
- Genre: Role-playing game
- Publisher: TSR
- Publication date: 1983
- Media type: Print (Hardback)

Monster Manual II is the title shared by two hardback rulebooks published for different versions of the Dungeons & Dragons (D&D) fantasy roleplaying game.

== Advanced Dungeons & Dragons ==
Monster Manual II was a 160-page hardcover book published in 1983, credited solely to Gary Gygax, which featured cover art by Jeff Easley. The book was a supplement describing over 250 monsters, most with illustrations. Many of the monsters were drawn from scenario modules, in particular from S4: Lost Caverns of Tsojcanth. The book included random encounter tables for dungeon and wilderness settings built from the Monster Manual, Fiend Folio, and Monster Manual II, and a dozen new devils that had been first published in the pages of Dragon magazine. Like the Fiend Folio before it, the monsters in Monster Manual II listed the experience point value for each monster within the entry. The Monster Manual II along with the First Edition Unearthed Arcana book featured quite a number of monsters, races, and places from Gary Gygax's Greyhawk Campaign world. The book featured interior illustrations by Jim Holloway, Harry Quinn, Dave Sutherland, and Larry Elmore.

In 1999, a paperback reprint of the first edition was released.

=== Reception ===
Monster Manual II garnered positive reviews, receiving a score of 7 out of 10 in a review in White Dwarf magazine. The reviewer praised the book's standard of clear presentation, and felt that the artwork was of a higher quality than that in the previous monster books. However, the reviewer felt that there were too many high level and overly deadly monsters, and that most of the monsters in the book were inimical to adventures. The reviewer did make note of the fact that there were "many interesting ideas and several well-developed tribes and hierarchies", and felt that, overall, the book is "a good, well presented addition to the AD&D series, with some very useful creatures". The reviewer recommended the book to anyone who likes a wide range of monsters in the game.

Doug Cowie reviewed Monster Manual II quite favorably for Imagine magazine. He noted that the cover was good, and contrasted it with the first edition Monster Manual, whose cover was "universally held to be appalling" and whose "childish style" may have "seriously hampered the development of RPGs as adult games". As for Monster Manual II, Cowie suggested: "If you like the AD&D game, go and buy it immediately." Although he found some monsters "to be just plain silly", they are all "well presented, properly thought out and adequately described".

Adam Benowitz reviewed Monster Manual II for Different Worlds magazine and stated that "Aside from the dragon shortage [...] MM II is excellent. It triumphs over old problems without creating new ones."

Mark Pokrzywnicki reviewed Advanced Dungeons & Dragons Monster Manual II for Fantasy Gamer magazine and stated that "If you're an AD&D buff, you must have this book. It is useful and exciting, and includes many official monsters never seen before. If your players are getting blase because they've memorized the first Manual and the Fiend Folio, spring a few darlings from the Monster Manual II on 'em. When you see their faces, you'll know what a good investment you made."

Lawrence Schick also commented on the Monster Manual II in Heroic Worlds, stating "Some of the monsters are less than inspired, and some are quite silly; this author's favorites are the stegocentipede, a giant arthropod notable for its twin row of back plates (wow!), and the stench kow, a monstrous bison that smells real bad."

Scott Taylor for Black Gate in 2014 listed Monster Manual II by Jeff Easley as #3 in The Top 10 TSR Cover Paintings of All Time.

Scott Taylor of Black Gate listed the Monster Manual II as #1 on the list of "Top 10 'Orange Spine' AD&D Hardcovers By Jeff Easley, saying "Jeff's first 'Orange Spine' and first hardcover AD&D work, and it absolutely takes it to church. If you haven't sat around wondering A: if this [is] a hill giant or and ogre lord and B: if this poor bastard fighter is going to live, then you aren't a D&D player. Truly, one of the greatest masterworks to ever grace a gaming product."

== Dungeons & Dragons 3rd edition ==
Monster Manual II
- Author: Ed Bonny, Jeff Grubb, Rich Redman, Skip Williams, and Steve Winter
- Genre: Role-playing game
- Publisher: Wizards of the Coast
- Publication date: September 2002
- Media type: Print (Hardcover)

Monster Manual II was a new monster-specific rulebook that contained mostly updated monsters from the sourcebooks of earlier editions, though some monsters have almost no overlap with those of their first edition namesakes. Monster Manual II also included a discussion of monster design. Monster Manual II was designed by Ed Bonny, Jeff Grubb, Rich Redman, Skip Williams, and Steve Winter. Cover art was by Henry Higginbotham, with interior art by Glen Angus, Daren Bader, Thomas Baxa, Matt Cavotta, Dennis Cramer, David Day, Brian Despain, Tony DiTerlizzi, Michael Dutton, Jeff Easley, Emily Fiegenschuh, Donato Giancola, Lars Grant-West, Rebecca Guay, Quinton Hoover, Jeremy Jarvis, Alton Lawson, Todd Lockwood, Raven Mimura, Matthew Mitchell, Vinod Rams, Wayne Reynolds, David Roach, Scott Roller, Richard Sardinha, Marc Sasso, Brian Snoddy, Anthony Waters, and Sam Wood.

According to Jeff Grubb for Monster Manual II, "The original plan was about 50 percent completely new, about 50 percent revisions of classic beasts that were not in the first Monster Manual. Right now, it's hard to tell because a lot of "classics" have been stripped down to their core concepts and names and rebuilt from the ground up." There was no new version of Monster Manual II for the 3.5 edition of D&D, although update errata was made available for download from the publisher's website.

=== Reception ===
Alan D. Kohler, a reviewer from Pyramid, commented: "The third edition of the game moved forward the "art" of monsters, providing them with more detailed statistics and methods for advancing creatures. It is in these footsteps that the Monster Manual II must follow."

=== Reviews ===
- Theurer, Mark (December 2002). "D20 Product Review: Monster Manual II" (PDF). Fictional Reality. No. 10. p. 52. Archived from the original on August 13, 2007.
- Coleção Dragão Brasil
