= Darkvision =

Darkvision may refer to:

- Darkvision (Dungeons & Dragons), a sense in Dungeons & Dragons
- Darkvision (novel), a fantasy novel by Bruce R. Cordell
