= Bastion of Faith =

Dungeons & Dragons game supplement

- Genre: Role-playing games
- Publisher: TSR
- Publication date: 2000

Bastion of Faith is an accessory for the 2nd edition of the Advanced Dungeons & Dragons fantasy role-playing game, published in 2000.

== Contents ==
Bastion of Faith is the third in a series of supplements where each book details one of the four core Advanced Dungeons & Dragons character classes, the first two books being College of Wizardry for mages and Den of Thieves for rogues. This book details the home, patrons, friends and allies for a priest, and the Bastion is the name for the Church of Heironeous.

Bastion of Faith details the upper levels in the hierarchy of the priesthood and also summarizes the church members, noting where the player characters may fit best. In the church of Heironeous, thieves are known as inquisitors, fighters are called templars, and mages are called catechists, and all of those who worship Heironeous gain spell-like abilities when they increase in experience level. The book includes details on fourteen members presenting their history, personality, statistics, possessions, and also illustrations for each. The book also introduces favors, which are a form of paper money.

== Publication history ==
Bastion of Faith was published by Wizards of the Coast, and written by Bruce R. Cordell.

== Reception ==
Bastion of Faith was reviewed by the online version of Pyramid on June 16, 2000. The reviewer says that regarding the actual Bastion described, this book "gives the DM enough details to choke a horse". The reviewer also comments on the summary of church members: "One of the nice things about the roster is that there are several 1st level characters with names that a GM can just scoop up and use as player characters. Not a priest? That's fine."
