= The Gates of Firestorm Peak =

Advanced Dungeons & Dragons module

- Rules required: Advanced Dungeons & Dragons, 2nd edition
- Authors: Bruce Cordell
- First published: 1996

The Gates of Firestorm Peak is an adventure module for the second edition of the Advanced Dungeons & Dragons fantasy role-playing game. The adventure was published in 1996, and was written by Bruce Cordell, with cover art by Jeff Easley and interior art by Arnie Swekel.

== Design ==
The Gates of Firestorm Peak incorporates the "Player's Option" rules into the adventure scenario, especially those from Player's Option: Combat & Tactics and Player's Option: Skills & Powers. The Gates of Firestorm Peak was designed for use the standard Advanced Dungeons & Dragons rules as well as the Player's Option rules and includes comments under the Player's Option Consideration heading at the end of every description and encounter. Bruce Cordell created the plane of madness known as Far Realm, inspired by the works of Lovecraft, for The Gates of Firestorm Peak.

== Plot summary ==
The Gates of Firestorm Peak is an adventure in which the Elder Elves opened a portal many years ago deep inside a mountain, which allowed them to explore new worlds. The elves were able to power this portal using the comet called the Dragon's Tear, which appears on a 27-year cycle, and enabled them to connect directly with an alternate reality. The elves have been gone for a long time but the link to this alien world remains intact, and as the comet returns that world will spill out.

The Gates of Firestorm Peak begins in the Shirelands at the village of Longbridge, located in the foothills of the mountain range that contains Firestorm Peak. In prehistory, the Elder Elves thrived during a previous Age of the world, and created a magical laboratory under Firestorm Peak where they opened a gate to the Far Realm which opens every 27 years. Over time, the bizarre physical laws and alien madness of the other dimension began to warp the areas underneath the mountain. Three hundred years ago a colony of duergar settled nearby and became guardians of the corrupted area. Decades ago, the evil conjurer Madreus bypassed the duergar and gained mastery of the Far Realm creatures residing in the complex underneath Firestorm Peak. In the last five years, he gained control of the duergar, and his studies and experiments have begun to cause manifestations of warped behavior in nature and society to spread beyond the legendary mountain. If not stopped by the player characters, the gate will eventually provide Madreus with the energies and allies he needs to bring the Far Realm's madness to the rest of the world.

== Reception ==
Trenton Webb reviewed The Gates of Firestorm Peak for Arcane magazine, rating it a 9 out of 10 overall. He called the adventure's premise "strong, if a little Stargatey" noting that it "would normally be enough to justify an adventure module. And it would be worthy of note for its solid design, varied structure and high-quality supplementary artwork. Yet what really makes Firestorm Peak different is that it's designed to be used with both the standard and Player's Option AD&D rules." Webb commented more fully on the Player's Option rules: "Now while the Player's Option series undoubtedly refined a woefully inadequate combat system and cleaned up spell casting, it did introduce a cartload of new rules too. And although each of these new rules was clearly explained in isolation, seeing them all in practice is an absolute must if you're to grasp the full impact of the system. As the first 'showcase' supplement for the system, Firestorm Peak does an excellent job." He continued: "With the simple addition of Player's Option Consideration comments at the end of each description or encounter, referees can see where the standard and Player's Option games differ. More importantly, these footnotes illustrate the extra depth that can be added to play if used well." Webb concluded his review by saying: "The Gates of Firestorm Peak is a totally playable, if somewhat long, adventure for all AD&D hackers. As a showcase for the Player's Option series, though, it works as both an illustrative guide to the new rules and an advert. Because if you haven't toyed with the new rules, you'll be wondering just why its players get some large-scale maps and cardboard cut-out pieces, but old-style AD&Ders don't."

The Gates of Firestorm Peak was ranked the 11th greatest Dungeons & Dragons adventure of all time by Dungeon in 2004, on the 30th anniversary of the Dungeons & Dragons game.
