= Fianna Tribebook =

Cover art by Aileen Miles, 1994

Fianna Tribebook is a supplement published by White Wolf Publishing in 1994 for the horror role-playing game Werewolf: The Apocalypse.

== Description ==
Fianna Tribebook details the Fianna, one of the tribes of werewolves found in Werewolf: The Apocalypse. The Fianna are a Celtic fey tribe; the book covers information a player would need to know in order to design a character, including tribal history, character templates and new character abilities. This book was the fourth in the series of books describing each of the twelve tribes.

== Publication history ==
=== First edition (1994) ===
The first edition is a 72-page softcover book designed by Harry Heckel, with John Bridges and Fallon Doherty, with artwork by Tony DiTerlizzi, Richard Kane, Brian LeBlanc, and Joshua Gabriel Timbrook, and cover art by Aileen Miles. The text is preceded by a graphic short story written by Harry Heckel, with art by Brian LeBlanc.

=== Reprint (1998) ===
In 1998, White Wolf reprinted all of the tribal books as a collection of four books titled Litany of the Tribes. The Fianna appeared in the second book, along with Get of Fenris and Glass Walkers.

=== Revised edition (2002) ===
A revised and expanded 104-page edition was published in 2002, designed by Forrest Marchinton, Cynthia Summers, and Adam Tinworth, with artwork by Jeremy Jarvis, Matthew Mitchell, Steve Presceott, Jeff Rebner, and Sherilyn Van Valkenburgh.

== Reception ==
In the June 1995 edition of Dragon (Issue #218), Rick Swan reviewed the first edition of this book, and thought the Fianna tribe as portrayed in the book to be "among the most intriguing." However, Swan was disappointed by the lack of "culture" in the book. "Where's the music?" he asked. "Where's the details about their oral traditions and compositional styles?" He also thought some of the writing was "awkward." But he concluded, "Still, designer Harry Heckel keeps the energy level of the text so intense, I half expected the book to jump out of the my lap and chase the cat around the room."

== Other reviews ==
- Envoyer #10 (Aug 1997)
- Envoyer Issue 67 (May 2002, p.6, in French)
