= The Sylvan Veil =

Fantasy role-playing adventure

Cover art by David L. Martin

The Sylvan Veil is a role-playing game adventure published by TSR in 1999 for the Dragonlance: Fifth Age campaign setting using either the rules for the second edition of Advanced Dungeons & Dragons, or the SAGA System rules.

== Description ==
The Sylvan Veil is an adventure set in the Silvanesti Forest, an area surrounded by a shield to protect its elven inhabitants from the Great Dragons. The shield is retreating, exposing more of the forest's inhabitants to danger. To restore the shield, the player characters are given the task of retrieving an artifact located in an ancient tomb.

The book gives an introduction to the Silvanesti Forest, and the adventure is divided into three acts with an interlude describing the elven city of Sithelnost. Players have a choice of six pre-generated characters, and are also told about the main nemesis of the adventure.

A final chapter gives the gamemaster some adventure hooks and ideas to be able to create more adventures in this setting.

== Publication history ==
In 1984, TSR moved away from Greyhawk, their original campaign setting for the fantasy role-playing game Dungeons & Dragons by publishing the first adventures and companion novels by Tracy Hickman and Margaret Weis for the world of Dragonlance. But after twenty years, Dragonlance had become moribund. Seeking to revivify Dragonlance, Hickman and Weis produced a new line of novels set in the "Fifth Age".

In his 2014 book Designers & Dragons, games historian Shannon Appelcline explained that "When Weis and Hickman's The War of Souls [trilogy] became sufficiently fleshed out, Wizards changed the era of the SAGA games one more time to this new time period — set a full generation later. This was the basis for their last two Dragonlance SAGA adventures, The Sylvan Veil (1999) and Rise of the Titans (2000)."

The Sylvan Veil was designed by William W. Connors, Miranda Horner, Steve Kenson, Duane Maxwell, Steve Miller, and Skip Williams, with cover art by David L. Martin, interior art by James Crabtree, Rebecca Mitchell, Jeff Menges, and Matthew Mitchell, and cartography by David S. LaForce and Robert Lazzaretti. It was published published in February 1999.

While The Sylvan Veil was being developed, WotC was starting to design a third edition of D&D. The Sylvan Veil was one of the final second edition/SAGA products, as well as one of the final products published under the TSR imprint. A few months later, WotC introduced the third edition of D&D under their own trademark, and discontinued making products that used the SAGA System rules.

== Reception ==
The German RPG magazine Envoyer liked the background material, including the social structure of the Silvanesti elves, calling it "interesting and well thought out." The magazine strongly recommended using the pregenerated characters to avoid social mishaps. The reviewer also commented "The plot is varied and, what a pleasant surprise, not overloaded with monster slaughter (and the fight scenes finally make sense and don't seem like filler for splatter fans). Social interactions, especially cultural conflicts, are certainly not neglected." The conclusion was positive, noting, "All in all a successful mix; not too overloaded with magic, and the materials included complement the adventure well."

In Issue 15 of the French games magazine Backstab, Michaël Croitoriu thought this product was poorly targeted, asking "How could creative people believe for a second that they could sell a game without dice to AD&D fans?" Despite this, Croitoriu concluded, "All in all, The Sylvan Veil is a good supplement provided, of course, that you are interested in the kingdom of Silvanesti and its future."

In Issue 119 of the French games magazine Casus Belli, Pierre Rosenthal noted that not all the background information in the new Draonglance novels had been published yet, commenting, "But the full background is only described in the Fifth Age game! We are therefore impatiently awaiting the series directly produced by the magical duo [Hickman and Weis], which will allow us to play the War of Chaos, to finally be able to move from the War of the Lance to the Fifth Age.
