= Complete Psionic =

Dungeons & Dragons supplement

- Complete Psionic Cover
- Authors: Bruce R. Cordell; Christopher Lindsay
- Genre: Role-playing game
- Publisher: Wizards of the Coast
- Publication date: April 2006
- Media type: Print (Hardback)
- Pages: 160
- ISBN: 0786939117

Complete Psionic is a supplemental rulebook for the 3.5 edition of the Dungeons & Dragons role-playing game published by Wizards of the Coast and released in April 2006. It is the first 3.5 edition supplemental rulebook published by Wizards of the Coast which focuses on psionics since the Expanded Psionics Handbook.

== Contents ==
It presents additional material related to psionics, including three new classes and a variant of the psion, eight new prestige classes, a new psionic race and numerous feats and psionic powers. Complete Psionic also explores the concept of illithid heritage through new character options: nine illithid heritage feats and a prestige class, the Flayerspawn Psychic.

The 160-page book was notable for adopting a recent formatting style by Wizards of the Coast, which generally involves an increase in page count for a given amount of information by including more background information. For example, classes and prestige classes include additional information on their role within the game, their organisation and lore. This formatting style resulted in eight prestige classes in Complete Psionic versus thirty-six in Complete Warrior.

=== Classes ===
Complete Psionic introduces three entirely new classes, and a fourth class, the erudite, which is described as a variant of the psion class. The ardent and divine mind classes were originally one and the same, but were separated before publication: the background and philosophical identity of the ardent was an original element, whilst this was originally to be combined with the psychic auras of the divine mind. The two were separated, and the more divinely influenced divine mind was created as a consequence.

==== New base classes ====
===== Ardent =====
Ardents derive their powers from a focus on primal truths or concepts ("mantles"); different mantles offer different abilities to an Ardent. They possess a smaller selection of powers than the more versatile Psion, but enjoy greater martial abilities.

===== Divine Mind =====
The Divine Mind is a character who chooses to serve a deity using psionic powers; they are thus somewhat similar to Clerics. Like clerics, they may choose mantles a deity represents, similar to domains. They may also exude Attack, Defense, or Perception auras that grant bonuses to nearby allies.

===== Lurk =====
Lurks are similar to rogues who call upon psionic powers to aid them. They may perceive the weaknesses of enemies and make sneak attacks, as well as use psionic augments to their abilities.

===== Erudite =====
The Erudite is a variant of the psion contained near the end of Complete Psionic. Whilst considered a variant, it is not an optional class, but rather a specific type of psion. Erudites do not specialise in 'disciplines' as do psions, but they are capable of memorising a virtually unlimited number of psionic powers, at the limitation that they can only manifest a limited number of unique powers each day. Erudites also automatically gain a psicrystal, which are crystals infused with the power of the psionicist's mind. An earlier version of the erudite appeared in Dragon issue #319.

==== New prestige classes ====
In addition to the new standard classes, Complete Psionic also introduces eight new prestige classes, adding to the nine in the Expanded Psionics Handbook and the smaller number printed in other Wizards of the Coast supplemental books.

- The Anarchic Initiate is a psionicist who focuses on the powers contained within the concept of chaos and uncertainty. Designed primarily for wilders, but also available to psions, anarchic initiates gain or improve their ability to invoke wild surges, whilst gaining new abilities derived from their chaotic powers, including the power to tear a breach in reality.
- The Ebon Saint is a prestige class designed mainly for the lurk class, but also available to certain rogues. Ebon saints are infiltrators who uncover other's secrets. They can perform dire strikes, which are sneak attacks which grant them additional insight into their foe's abilities, and then they may utilise their unique dire augments which the ebon saint can use to steal the thoughts of their foes, or even steal the very form of their foe.
- The Ectopic Adept, a prestige class for shapers which improves on the psionic power 'astral construct', the creation of deadly constructs from ectoplasm. Ectopic adepts gain the ability to control more than one astral construct at once at higher levels. (Complete Psionic introduced a rules change that limited the summoning of constructs to one at a time)
- The Flayerspawn Psychic is a psionic individual who seeks to learn more of her illithid heritage and thereby transform herself, eventually, into an illithid, including gaining the ability to use the deadly mind blast power.
- The Illumine Soul is a prestige class for soulknives. Illumine souls are conduits for positive energy, eventually forming a link with the Positive Energy Plane. Whilst maintaining the martial study of their mindblades, illumine souls gain the ability to use positive energy as a weapon, and defence against the undead, as well as to heal themselves.
- The Soulbow, a Soulknife based class. Soulbows gain versatility with their mindblades, gaining the ability to "shoot" them with the force of a bow.
- The Storm Disciple, a psion focused on the thunder and lightning of a storm.
- The Zerth Cenobite, a prestige class based on a group of monks who study the passage of time and developed time travel.

==== Synad ====
Synad

In-universe information
- Type: Aberration
- Alignment: Any

Synads are aberrations that appear human, but have three different minds working together inside their head.

- The Overmind is the controlling part of the mind.
- The Oracle can see into the future.
- The Collective has access to a large collection of knowledge, which expands the information available to the character.

== Publication history ==
Complete Psionic was written by Bruce R. Cordell, author of the Expanded Psionics Handbook, and Christopher Lindsay, and was published in April 2006. Cover art was by Raven Mimura, with interior art by Wayne England, David Griffith, Jon Hodgson, Ralph Horsley, Warren Mahy, William O'Connor, Ted Pendergraft, Richard Sardinha, and Ron Spencer.

Bruce R. Cordell explained what inspired his interest in psionics: "I checked every character I rolled for the small chance he might have psionics, according to the rules at the back of the 1st edition Player's Handbook. Every so often, I got lucky; my first psionic character could use mind blast and go ethereal; that is, until my DM, concerned with the havoc I was wreaking with his game, engineered an encounter between myself and Kulgar the Mind-Ripper. Good-bye going ethereal at will. [...] Much later, I had the good fortune to write the Ilithiad for 2nd edition, as well as three supporting adventures. Because I had to delve so deeply into psionics, including suggesting the use of alternate rules (again, for game balance!), I came away with an even stronger appreciation for the possibilities psionics could offer a D&D game."
