= Julie Martin =

Julie Martin may refer to:

- Julie Martin (Neighbours), a fictional Australian soap-opera character
- Julie Martin (writer), U.S. television writer and producer
- Julie Martin (artist), contemporary artist and author

== See also ==
- Julia Martin, game designer and editor
