= Steve Miller (game designer) =

American game designer and editor

- Education: Bachelor of Arts (English), University of Utah
- Occupation: Game Designer

Steve Miller is a game designer and editor who has worked on a number of products for the Dungeons & Dragons fantasy role-playing game from Wizards of the Coast, and other role-playing games.

== Early life and education ==
Steve Miller wanted to be a writer from an early age: "Actually, when I was in first grade, I wanted to be a sheriff's deputy... Then I wrote a little book in first grade called 'The Man Who Watches' about a sheriff's deputy, and I won some sort of prize for it. From then on, I wanted to be a writer." After Miller graduated from the University of Utah with a degree in English, with a Creative Writing emphasis, he began working as a publicist for a television station, at the same time freelancing as a feature writer and entertainment critic for various weekly newspapers and magazines. During this time he also unsuccessfully attempted to break into the comic book industry.

== Career ==
A fellow gamer suggested that Miller try writing role-playing game material, so the next day Miller called Bruce Heard at TSR. Heard, who handled the scheduling of TSR's freelancers at the time, set Miller up with editing and design tests. His first freelance assignment came a few months later. After a few months of freelancing, Tim Brown called Miller and offered him a staff job after Miller wrote him a letter of thanks for providing writing tips: "I'd said in the letter, 'if you have any openings, please keep me in mind,' not really thinking anything would come of it." Miller accepted the job, working on the Ravenloft and Dragonlance lines during his time with TSR and later Wizards of the Coast. Bruce Cordell and Miller worked on Die Vecna Die! (2000) together, an original adventure that brought an end to the Advanced Dungeons & Dragons line. Miller co-wrote the first 3rd Edition Forgotten Realms adventure Into the Dragon's Lair with Sean K. Reynolds. Between his stints at TSR and Wizards of the Coast, Miller worked for West End Games on their Star Wars Adventure Journal product line.

In late June 2011, Miller began distributing role-playing game material and fiction in digital format under NUELOW Games, with exclusive distribution through OneBookShelf websites. In June 2013, Miller added hybrid comics book/game products to NUELOW Games's line-up.
