= Die Vecna Die! =

Advanced Dungeons & Dragons adventure module

- Code: 11662
- Rules required: 2nd Ed AD&D
- Character levels: 10 - 13
- Campaign setting: Greyhawk; Ravenloft; Planescape
- Authors: Bruce R. Cordell; Steve Miller
- First published: 2000

Die Vecna Die! is an Advanced Dungeons & Dragons (AD&D 2nd edition) module released in 2000 by Wizards of the Coast. The module is divided into three sections, each taking part in a different campaign setting: Greyhawk, Ravenloft, and Planescape. It was one of the last official adventures released for the 2nd edition of Dungeons & Dragons.

== Plot summary ==
This adventure, and Vecna's multiverse-shattering plan contained within it, have been used by some D&D fans as an in-game explanation of the differences between the 2nd and 3rd editions of Dungeons & Dragons. The closing paragraph of the module reads as follows:

"Even with Vecna's removal, his time in the crux effected change in superspace. Though the Lady of Pain attempts to heal the damage, the turmoil spawned by Vecna's time in Sigil cannot be entirely erased. Some Outer Planes drift off and are forever lost, others collide and merge, while at least one Inner Plane runs "aground" on a distant world of the Prime. Moreover, the very nature of the Prime Material Plane itself is altered. Half-worlds like those attached to Tovag Baragu multiply a millionfold, taking on parallel realism in what was before a unified Prime Material Plane. The concept of alternate dimensions rears its metaphorical head, but doesn't yet solidify, and perhaps it never will. New realms, both near and far, are revealed and realms never previously imagined make themselves known. Entities long thought lost emerge once more, while other creatures, both great and small, are inexplicably eradicated. Some common spells begin to work differently. The changes do not occur immediately, but instead are revealed during the subsequent months. However, one thing remains clear: Nothing will ever be the same again."

== Publication history ==
Die Vecna Die! was written by Bruce Cordell and Steve Miller, with cover art by Paul Bonner and interior art by Kevin McCann. It is a 160-page softcover book designed for four to six characters of levels 10 to 13.

== Reception ==
Shannon Appelcline comments that as the Advanced Dungeons & Dragons line ended, Wizards produced Die Vecna Die! as

an original adventure that touched upon the oldest locales and the most ancient myths of the D&D game, while still presenting something entirely new. The result was […] an adventure that played two ancient artefacts – the Eye and Hand of Vecna – against the cambion demigod Iuz and which featured a trek through the campaign settings of Greyhawk, Ravenloft and Planescape. It was the final product published under the TSR brand, the final book for AD&D and truly the end of an era.

In 2013, Alex Lucard, for Diehard GameFAN, wrote:

Die Vecna, Die is more of a campaign than a mere adventure, and it's arguably the most ambitious thing ever put out for Second Edition AD&D. Die Vecna, Die is no mere adventure, but a massive undertaking for high level characters, seeing them go through not one, but THREE different campaign settings. [...] Players will encounter some of the most iconic and evil characters in all of Dungeons & Dragons, and have to witness firsthand the end of the Second Edition Universe, and the beginning of Third Edition. [...] It's a damn shame how overlooked and underrated Die Vecna, Die is, as it's easily the best long campaign like adventure ever put out for Second Edition. It's a massive undertaking akin to, say Horror on the Orient Express for Call of Cthulhu, but much like that seminal work, Die Vecna, Die is worth it, especially if you are a fan of any or all of the campaign settings that you will work your way through here.

== Reviews ==
- Coleção Dragon Slayer
