= Illithid =

Fictional monster from Dungeons & Dragons

- Dungeons & Dragons race
- Illustration of Sarkt the Illithid sorcerer from the 3.5E supplement Lords of Madness (2005).
- First appearance: "The Strategic Review #1 (Spring 1975)"; Eldritch Wizardry (1976)
- Last appearance: Phandelver and Below: The Shattered Obelisk (2023)

In-universe information
- Other name: Mind flayer
- Type: Aberration
- Alignment: Almost always Lawful Evil

In the Dungeons & Dragons fantasy role-playing game, illithids (commonly known as mind flayers) are monstrous humanoid aberrations with psionic powers. In a typical Dungeons & Dragons campaign setting, they live in the moist caverns and cities of the enormous Underdark.

Illithids believe themselves to be the dominant species of the multiverse and use other intelligent creatures as thralls, slaves, and chattel. Illithids are well known for making thralls out of other intelligent creatures, as well as feasting on their brains.

== Publication history ==
Mind flayers were created by Gary Gygax, who said that one of his inspirations for them was the cover painting of the Titus Crow book The Burrowers Beneath by Brian Lumley. Tim Kirk's cover art on the book, then in its first printing, depicted only the tentacles of the titular burrowers, the Chthonians.

=== Dungeons & Dragons (1974–1976) ===
Mind flayers first appeared in the official newsletter of TSR, The Strategic Review #1, Spring 1975, in the section named "Creature Features". Here, the mind flayer is described as "a super-intelligent, man-shaped creature with four tentacles by its mouth which it uses to strike its prey." When it hits prey with a tentacle, the tentacle penetrates to the brain and draws it forth, allowing the monster to devour it. A mind flayer's major weapon is given as the Mind Blast, a 5-foot radius wave of "Psi force" which affects each opponent differently based on how intelligent it is; possible effects include permanent insanity, rage, confusion, coma, and death. The first illustration depicting mind flayers was by artist Tracy Lesch, who envisioned them "like a Ming the Merciless with the mental powers of a Professor X", which appeared in the Blackmoor (1975) supplement. Game statistics for mind flayers were also included in the Eldritch Wizardry supplement.

=== Advanced Dungeons & Dragons 1st edition (1977–1988) ===
The mind flayer appears in the first edition Monster Manual (1977). Roger E. Moore authored "The Ecology of the Mind Flayer," which featured in Dragon #78 (October 1983).

=== Advanced Dungeons & Dragons 2nd edition (1989–1999) ===
The mind flayer appears first in the Monstrous Compendium Volume One (1989), and is reprinted in the Monstrous Manual (1993).

The Complete Psionics Handbook (1991) presented ways on using mind flayers with psionic powers.

The alhoon, also known as the illithilich or mind flayer lich, was introduced in the Menzoberranzan boxed set, in the booklet "Book One: The City" (1992).

The book The Illithiad (April 1998), and the Monstrous Arcana module series that accompanies it, greatly develops the mind flayer further. The Illithiad introduced the illithid elder brain and the illithid-roper crossbreed, the urophion. The module Dawn of the Overmind featured an origin story for the illithids.

=== Dungeons & Dragons 3.0 edition (2000–2002) ===
The mind flayer appears in the Monster Manual for this edition (2000). Savage Species (2003) added the mind flayer "racial class", allowing Mind Flayers to be played from level 1 onward until they reached parity with normal Mind Flayers, and added the "Illithid Savant" prestige class.

=== Dungeons & Dragons 3.5 edition (2003–2007) ===
The mind flayer appears in the revised Monster Manual for this edition (2003), in both playable and non-playable forms. One of the differences between the playable Mind Flayer in the Monster Manual and the Mind Flayer racial class in Savage Species is that the racial class has only itself as a favored class, while the normal Mind Flayer has wizard as a favored class. The mind flayer received its own chapter in the book Lords of Madness: The Book of Aberrations (2005).

The Expanded Psionics Handbook (2004) re-introduced the psionic mind flayer, detailing the differences between psionic and normal mind flayers, although creating a Psionic Mind Flayer still requires the information from the Monster Manual.

=== Dungeons & Dragons 4th edition (2008–2014) ===
The mind flayer appears in the Monster Manual for this edition (2008).

=== Dungeons & Dragons 5th edition (2014–present) ===
The mind flayer appears in the Monster Manual for this edition (2014). Additional information about the mind flayers is found in Volo's Guide to Monsters (2016). The information includes details about their origins, their reproduction, their dispositions and behaviors, and their elder brain. The book also details this edition's Alhoon, Ulitharid, Mindwitness and Neothelid. The limited edition alternate cover of Volo's Guide to Monsters features an Illithid illustration by Hydro74. On the fictional canon of mind flayers, 5th Edition designer Chris Perkins, in a 2019 interview, stated:

If something has been consistently true about a monster throughout the game's history, it's a good bet that it holds true in Fifth Edition. Everything that we know is true about mind flayers in Fifth Edition can be found in the 5E Monster Manual and the "Mind Flayers: Scourge of Worlds" section of Volo's Guide to Monsters. The latter resource, in particular, picks up elements of mind flayer lore from earlier sourcebooks, including The Illithiad [from 2E] and Lords of Madness [from 3.5E].

ComicBook.com reported that the "big bads" of the module Phandelver and Below: The Shattered Obelisk (2023) are mind flayers, with the adventure including new variants of mind flayers. Christian Hoffer of ComicBook.com commented that mind flayers "have appeared in many 5E adventures over the last decade", however, this module is the first in the edition to have them as the "central villain of the campaign instead of merely one of many side threats. What's more, these mind flayers have a goal somewhat similar to one of the central threats faced by players in Baldur's Gate 3 - ceremorphosis, the process of becoming a mind flayer".

== Fictional physical characteristics ==
Illithids have a humanoid body with an octopus-like head, which has been observed as a similarity to H. P. Lovecraft's Cthulhu.

One of their most feared powers is the dreaded Mind Blast, where the illithid emits a cone-shaped psionic shock wave with its mind in order to incapacitate any creature for a short amount of time.

=== Biology ===
Illithids are hermaphroditic creatures who each spawn a mass of larvae two or three times in their life. The larvae resemble miniature illithid heads or four-tentacled tadpoles. Larvae are left to develop in the pool of the Elder Brain. The ones that survive after 10 years are inserted into the brain of a sapient creature. Hosts are determined in a very specific manner. Hosts generally are humanoid creatures that are between 5 feet 4 inches and 6 feet 2 inches. The most desirable of races for hosts are humans, drow, elves, githzerai, githyanki, grimlocks, gnolls, goblinoids, and orcs. Upon being implanted (through any cranial orifice), the larva then grows and consumes the host's brain, absorbing the host's physical form entirely and becoming sapient itself, a physically mature (but mentally young) illithid. This process is called ceremorphosis.

== Variants ==
=== Alhoon ===
Alhoons (also called illithiliches) are illithids that choose to focus on developing arcane abilities in addition to their psionic ones, and have grown powerful enough in magic to become undead liches. Alhoons are generally pariahs in illithid society because they go against most illithids' eventual goal: to merge with the Elder Brain, both physically and psionically. Alhoons, on the other hand, are more concerned with their own personal survival. When discovered near illithid communities, alhoons are mercilessly hunted down.

The alhoon first appeared in second edition AD&D for the Forgotten Realms setting in the Menzoberranzan boxed set, in the booklet "Book One: The City" (1992), and reprinted in Monstrous Compendium Annual Volume Three (1996). The creature was further detailed in the supplement The Illithiad (1998). The alhoon also appeared in third edition in Monsters of Faerûn (2001) and Lords of Madness (2005).

=== Ulitharid ===
A stronger mindflayer which can provide a significantly more challenging encounter, and which has the capability of becoming an elder brain.

=== Vampiric illithids ===
The origins of these unique undead mind flayers are unclear. All that is known of these creatures is that they cannot create spawn, need both fresh blood and fresh brains to survive, are more feral than typical illithids, and are barely intelligent. One possible origin is given in the Ravenloft adventure Thoughts of Darkness, where "vampiric mind flayers are either the result of a Mind Flayer tadpole infecting a vampiric host or a host that becomes a vampire before the tadpole fully converts them". These creatures are hated and feared by typical illithids. Christian Hoffer, for ComicBook.com, wrote, "Not only do the vampiric mind flayers possess the psionic powers of a mind flayer, they also have the undead strength and bloodlust of a vampire, making them twice as deadly". Hoffer also highlighted that they "were created when Lyssa von Zarovich (a descendant of Strahd) attempted to create a creature powerful enough to overthrow her great uncle". Jacob Creswell, for CBR, highlighted that "Vampiric Mind Flayers are a classic Dungeon & Dragons monster that combines two terrifying concepts. [...] Originally known as vampiric illithids, vampiric mind flayers were a force to be reckoned with in Advanced Dungeons & Dragons. Their superior strength stat meant that they'd be able to overpower most adventurers". Creswell included them on list of the seven best monsters introduced in the 5th Edition campaign guide Van Richten's Guide to Ravenloft.

=== Related creatures ===
Brainstealer Dragon: A mix of illithid and dragon, these powerful wyrms occasionally rule over illithid communities that lack an elder brain.

Illithocyte: Illithid tadpoles that survived the fall of a mind flayer empire, they evolved into a new life form and now crawl about in groups seeking psychic radiation on which to feed.

Kezreth: A living troop transport and battle platform created from the severed head of a shamed illithid. They serve in this capacity in the hope of redeeming themselves and being allowed to return to the elder brain.

Mind Worm: Created by illithids to serve as assassins and bounty-hunters, these powerful psionic creatures resemble smaller purple worms. They can attack from far distances with their probe worms.

Nerve Swimmers: Derived from immature illithid tadpoles, these entities are living instruments of torture and interrogation.

Ustilagor: Mind flayers farm these larval intellect devourers for food and sentries.

Vampire Squid: Servitor creatures created by illithids to extend their reach below the surface of Underdark waters. They have a maw of sharp teeth which can be turned inside out and function as defensive spikes.

== Fictional history ==
The 3.5 Edition D&D supplement Lords of Madness provides that the Illithid were a star-faring people who existed at the end of time. Facing annihilation, the Illithid traveled to the past, arriving roughly 2000 years before the present in any given D&D campaign.

Gith was betrayed by one of her own generals, Zerthimon, who believed she had grown tyrannical and over-aggressive. Civil war erupted, and the race factionalised into the githyanki and the githzerai (and in the Spelljammer campaign setting the Pirates of Gith).

The background material of the Chainmail game places the gith forerunners in a subterranean empire called Zarum in Western Oerik, where they dominated many other races from their capital city of Anithor.

=== Religion ===
Traditionally, illithids revere a perverse deity named Ilsensine. In 2nd edition, they have a second deity named Maanzecorian, who is later killed by Tenebrous (Orcus) in the Planescape adventure module Dead Gods. Although Ilsensine is the illithid patron deity, few mind flayers actively worship it, thinking themselves the most powerful creatures in the universe.

=== Activities ===
As of Lords of Madness (2005), the illithids are in a period of intense study and experimentation, gathering knowledge in hopes of eventually reconquering the universe and holding it for good. They frequently meddle in the politics of other races through subtle psychic manipulation of key figures, not to cause chaos but to better understand the dynamics of civilization. They regularly probe the minds of surface dwellers to gather intelligence and learn about new advances in magic and technology. They also do a good deal of research themselves, mainly focused on developing new psychic powers.

Illithids regularly conduct raids on all sentient settlements to acquire new thralls.

== In various campaign settings ==
=== In Dragonlance ===
The yaggol are a variant presented in the Dragonlance campaign setting.

=== In Ravenloft ===
Illithids are the rulers of a domain in the Ravenloft campaign setting called Bluetspur, where their God-Brain is the darklord. In the 5th Edition campaign guide Van Richten's Guide to Ravenloft, it is revealed that an elder brain became diseased by discovering a "malignant truth" and it began to prey "upon its peers [...]. Horrified by an affliction that infected only them, the other elder brains united and psionically expelled the diseased brain from existence. Or so they thought. From a place without time or reality, the Dark Powers plucked the dying elder brain and planted it upon a tormented world". Polygon highlighted that Bluetspur is "a world of cosmic horror populated by malevolent mind flayers that will make your heroes question their own memories".

=== In Spelljammer ===
According to Ken Rolston, the beholder and the mind flayer "win starring roles as intergalactic menaces" in Spelljammer, describing the mind flayers as "evil, brain-sucking horrors who have polished up their social skills sufficiently to present a dubiously neutral facade to trading partners as they secretly scheme toward the day when all intelligent races will be their vassals and brain-food". D&D chroniclers Michael Witwer et al. commented on their appearance in the setting, already featured on the cover of AD&D Adventures in Space: "the illithid, the race of the mind flayers, finally return home to space".

=== Pharagos: The Battleground ===
In a proposed campaign setting, Pharagos is a lightly populated Earth-like world with three continents and numerous chains of islands. The one remarkable feature of this world is the presence of an immense petrified corpse of a god previously worshiped by the Forerunner civilization before it was crushed by the illithid empire. A vast stony column of forgotten beliefs, it is buried deep in the ground. The current inhabitants of Pharagos have no knowledge of the planet's past; the illithid empire's rule over Pharagos and the origin of the gith races on this world are lost to history. They are unaware that the source of mystical power for their numerous cults comes from the presence of the dead god under their land.

== Critical reception ==
The mind flayer was ranked fourth among the ten best mid-level monsters by the authors of Dungeons & Dragons For Dummies. They referred to this unique creation of the D&D game as the "quintessential evil genius" and the "perfect evil overlord". Games journalist David M. Ewalt found them "one of D&D's most popular monsters". Academic Philip J. Clements considered mind flayers one of the "game's signature monsters", while Backstab reviewer Philippe Tessier called it a "classic of D&D" and Witwer et al. "iconic D&D monsters".

The Stranger writer Cienna Madrid described the Mind Flayer as one of D&D's "ghastly fiends". Reviewer Julien Blondel for Backstab described them as vile brain-eating creatures full of psionic energy. He found them delightful creatures for a sadistic Dungeon Master to use, and a useful bridge between classic game worlds and the planes, as illithids abound in both.

Rob Bricken of io9 named the mind flayer as the 9th most memorable D&D monster. SyFy Wire in 2018 called it one of "The 9 Scariest, Most Unforgettable Monsters From Dungeons & Dragons", saying that "Mind flayers are another classic monster like the beholder." Screen Rant compiled a list of the game's "10 Most Powerful (And 10 Weakest) Monsters, Ranked" in 2018, calling the elder brain one of the strongest, saying that while the 5th "edition of Dungeons & Dragons has toned down the elder brain a lot", it "still represents a grave threat to most adventuring parties, thanks to its range of powerful enchantment spells and psionic attacks, but it isn't quite the epic level threat that it once was." Reviewer Scott Baird also found that the illithids in general "are considered to be one of the most disliked creatures in all of Dungeons & Dragons."

== In other media ==
Mind flayers appear in other role-playing games, including Angband, Bloodborne, Demon's Souls, Final Fantasy, NetHack, Lost Kingdoms, Kingdom of Loathing and Lost Souls, and the one-player gamebook RPG series Fighting Fantasy includes a creature similar to the illithid, the Brain Slayer.

- Ulchalothe in Baldur's Gate: Dark Alliance II is the guardian of the Brazier of Eternal Flame. There are illithid settlements of varying size in the games Neverwinter Nights: Hordes of the Underdark, Baldur's Gate II and Icewind Dale II. The villain in the Neverwinter Nights premium module 'Kingmaker' is also an Illithid.
- Illithid characters and plot elements play a central role throughout the story of Baldur's Gate 3.
- In episode 30 of the webcomic Order of the Stick (written by Rich Burlew), the party bard Elan encounters an illithid in its lair. The illithid opts not to consume Elan's brain due to the bard's stupidity, and so they start playing Scrabble instead. Episode 31 makes a reference to the illithid's preferred diet. Episode 32 makes a fourth-wall reference to the fact that the illithid isn't open-source material.
- In the Final Fantasy series, players encounter an enemy called the Mindflayer, a cave-dwelling magic user that has the head of a squid, wears a flowing robe, and wields a staff. When the first game for the NES was brought to North America it was referred to as a Sorcerer. Although the Mindflayer's name and appearance have been kept the same, the "Beholder" was changed to Evil Eye.
- The Netflix series Stranger Things, following the eighth episode of the second season, used the name "Mind Flayer" to refer to one of the main antagonists of the series due to their similar natures.

=== Licensing ===
The illithid is considered "Product Identity" by Wizards of the Coast and as such is not released under its Open Game License.
