= Heather Hudson (artist) =

American fantasy illustrator

- Known for: Fantasy art

Heather Hudson is a fantasy illustrator, primarily known for her work in Magic: the Gathering, as well as Dungeons & Dragons. Some of her work is done is under the pseudonym "Erica Gassalasca-Jape".

== Career ==
Heather Hudson is known for her work on Magic: The Gathering. Her art has been featured on nearly 200 cards published by the Magic the Gathering franchise. Some of her notable pieces have been on cards such as "Kodama's Reach", "Pongify", "Ghost Quarter", and "Disenchant". Her Dungeons & Dragons interior illustration work includes the Psionics Handbook (2000), the Expanded Psionics Handbook (2004), the Magic Item Compendium (2007), and the fourth edition Monster Manual (2008).

== Current projects ==
Hudson's website states that she has been working with the Cloud Leopard Project, a charity aimed at protecting the Cloud Leopards of Thailand's Khao Yai region, to create a dual-language conservation book for free distribution to Thai students in the Khao Yai area, both to create awareness of the Cloud Leopards' ecological plight and to serve as a Thai/English teaching aid.
