= Into the Dragon's Lair =

Dungeons & Dragons adventure module

- Rules required: Dungeons & Dragons, 3rd edition
- Character levels: 10th
- Authors: Steve Miller and Sean K Reynolds
- First published: 2000

Into the Dragon's Lair is an adventure module for the 3rd edition of the Dungeons & Dragons fantasy role-playing game.

== Plot summary ==
Into the Dragon's Lair takes place in the Forgotten Realms setting, and takes place after the novels The High Road and The Death of a Dragon by Troy Denning. The nation of Cormyr tries to rebuild after the death of King Azoun IV, and seeks the treasure hoard of a dragon to fund these efforts and keep the kingdom from falling into chaos. The player characters must find this treasure before all the other seekers.

== Publication history ==
Into the Dragon's Lair was published in October 2000, and was written by Steve Miller and Sean K Reynolds. Cover art was by Paul Bonner and interior art by Michael Collins.

== Reception ==
The reviewer from Pyramid suggested that "for the most part it's a standard hunt for treasure", but commented: "While sounding simple, during the course of the adventure, the players must deal with not one, but two rival groups of adventurers."
