= The Shattered Circle =

Advanced Dungeons & Dragons adventure

Cover art by Tony Szczudlo

The Shattered Circle is a fantasy role-playing game adventure published by TSR in 1999 using the rules of the second edition of Advanced Dungeons & Dragons (AD&D).

== Plot summary ==
One menhir in an ancient stone circle near Cahervaniel has fallen over, revealing a dark tunnel beneath it. A local shepherd has disappeared, monsters have begun to appear at night, and the adventurers are called in to investigate. They discover a vast 3-level underground labyrinth ruled by an ancient spirit.

The Shattered Circle is a 28-page adventure recommended for player characters of Levels 1–3; however, several critics found the adventure too lethal for low-level adventurers and recommended some judicious editing of the monsters and traps by the gamemaster to make the adventure less deadly.

== Publication history ==
In 1997, TSR was taken over by Wizards of the Coast (WotC), but the new owners kept the TSR marque for work related to AD&D. Two years later, Bruce Cordell designed the AD&D adventure The Shattered Circle and it was published in 1999 with cover art by Tony Szczudlo and cartography by Robert Lazzaretti and Sam Wood.

It was one of the final products for the second edition of AD&D, and one of the final products published under the TSR marque. A few months later, WotC introduced the third edition of Dungeons & Dragons and published it under their own trademark.

== Reception ==
In Issue 29 of the German RPG magazine Envoyer, the reviewer noted, "According to the description, it is intended for characters of levels 1–3, either real newcomers or new characters from more experienced players. The latter is certainly the better option — for a real newcomer to the hobby, the setting has a few too many pitfalls and probably also a death rate that is too high." It was felt that the adventure was well-structured, but a bit overpowered for a low-level party. In particular the suggestion was made to remove or fake a few of the many deadly traps to reduce the number of character deaths. The final boss fight was also deemed too powerful. The reviewer concluded on positive note, writing, "Beautiful scenery, good brainstorming, idiosyncratic direction, splatter-heavy — with some careful editing by the gamemaster, the end product could be something quite good."

In Issue 14 of the French games magazine Backstab, Phillippe Tessier called this "a very classic adventure that takes the heroes into dark underground spaces haunted by spidery creatures." However, Tessier found the adventure over-powered for 1st and 2nd level characters, and suggested "level 3 is really a minimum, some creatures being quite powerful." Several issues later, Thomas Féron reviewed the new French translation, and wrote "There's a word for it: a dungeon. A real one, a pure one, a tough one, the one where you grope for traps and repaint the walls with wandering monsters." Féron also found the adventure to difficult for low-level characters, but noted that it was suitable for new players, commenting, "this kind of scenario will rather interest young players and DMs, allowing them to complete it in two evenings or two or three afternoons. For veterans of the genre, one session and the deal is done." Féron concluded by giving the adventure an average score of 6 out of 10.

In Issue 119 of the French games magazine Casus Belli, Pierre Rosenthal compared this to TSR's famous introductory modules B1 In Search of the Unknown and B2 The Keep on the Borderlands, calling it "Very classically designed, it has the same objective as the legendary B1 and B2 mods: to provide a simple and dangerous adventure to beginner characters."
