= Expanded Psionics Handbook =

Dungeons & Dragons sourcebook

- Expanded Psionics Handbook for D&D version 3.5
- Author: Bruce R. Cordell
- Genre: Role-playing game
- Publisher: Wizards of the Coast
- Publication date: April 2004
- Media type: Print (Hardback)
- Pages: 224
- ISBN: 978-0-7869-3301-3

The Expanded Psionics Handbook is a sourcebook written by Bruce Cordell for the 3.5 edition of the Dungeons & Dragons fantasy roleplaying game that contains rules and options for integrating psychic powers (also known as psionics) into the game. Along with its predecessor, the Psionics Handbook, the Expanded Psionics Handbook expands and adapts the psionics concept with a new emphasis on balance and playability.

== Contents ==
Your character’s mind is an infinite metaphorical plane, where all things are possible... A psionic character knows the mental pathways that lead to amazing edifices of thought and energy. Knowing the path, the psionic character walks it. Like a flare being thrown off a star, a power is manifested from a psionic character’s energy of consciousness.

— Bruce R. Cordell, The Expanded Psionics Handbook

The Expanded Psionics Handbook contains a system for adding psionics to Dungeons and Dragons. Psionics use a different system from traditional D&D spellcasting, using a point pool to track a character's power usage.

The Expanded Psionics Handbook introduces four Base Classes, several prestige classes alters some rules and includes a new system for becoming psionically focused. The base classes are the psion and psychic warrior (both of which are reprints from the Psionics Handbook), the wilder, and the soulknife. The prestige classes are the cerebremancer, elocater, fist of Zuoken, illithid slayer, metamind, psion uncarnate, pyrokineticist, thrallherd and the war mind.

The Handbook also contains four new psionic races—the dromites, elan, maenads, and xelphs—provides psionic versions of dwarves, githyanki, githzerai, and yuan-ti. It adds several new psionic monsters, including the intellect devourer and temporal filcher, and adds the phrenic template, which can make any Dungeons and Dragons creature a psionic creature.

== Publication history ==
The Expanded Psionics Handbook was published in 2004. Cover art was by Henry Higginbotham, with interior art by Steven Belledin, Brian Despain, Wayne England, Lars Grant-West, Heather Hudson, Jeremy Jarvis, Chuck Lukacs, David Martin, Monte Moore, Jim Pavelec, Wayne Reynolds, Arnie Swekel and Sam Wood.

This book is intended as a 3.5 adaptation and revision of the Psionics Handbook for 3rd Edition, which was released in 2001. It was adapted for several reasons, including changes to the core D20 system and balance concerns. Some players considered psions to be weaker than wizards and sorcerers.

== Reception ==
The reviewer from Pyramid found the prestige classes in the book "more imaginative, with beings who leave their physical form behind for a life of mental existence, hunters who kill illithids, and the irresistibly heroic Fist of Zuoken".

== Reviews ==
- Backstab #48
