= Julia Martin =

American game designer and editor

Julia Martin is a game designer and editor who has worked on a number of products for the Dungeons & Dragons fantasy roleplaying game.

== Career ==
Julia Martin worked for Game Designers' Workshop until she left in 1991 to work for TSR. Martin worked as an editor for the Forgotten Realms setting, editing works such as the Volo's Guide series and the Powers and Pantheons and Demihuman Deities supplements; with Eric L. Boyd she wrote Faiths & Avatars. Martin took over as lead editor of the Dungeons & Dragons 3rd Edition design project from Kim Mohan when he was promoted to managing editor during the second half of the design stage. While overseeing the entire editing process, she contributed different parts to each of the three core books: the Player's Handbook, the Dungeon Master's Guide, and the Monster Manual.

She later became a senior editor at Wizards of the Coast.

== Works ==
Julia Martin worked for Game Designers Workshop from 1988-1990 before coming to work for TSR on numerous Dungeons & Dragons game products since 1992. She has worked on products such as Faiths & Avatars (1996) and Faiths and Pantheons (2002) for the Forgotten Realms product line.

Trenton Webb of British RPG magazine Arcane, declared that "Julia Martin and Eric L. Boyd deserve medals for what they've achieved with Faiths & Avatars. They probably also deserve professional psychiatric help for even attempting to codify and clarify the twisted theology of Abeir-Toril. The resultant work is exhaustive. It's also exhausting."
