= Grasp of the Emerald Claw =

Dungeons & Dragons adventure module

- Rules required: Dungeons & Dragons, 3.5 edition
- Character levels: 6th
- Authors: Bruce R. Cordell
- First published: January 2005

Grasp of the Emerald Claw is an adventure module for the 3.5 edition of the Dungeons & Dragons fantasy role-playing game.

== Plot summary ==
Grasp of the Emerald Claw takes place in the Eberron setting. The player characters must find a relic of great power deep in the jungles of Xen'drik before the agents of the Order of the Emerald Claw locate it.

== Publication history ==
Grasp of the Emerald Claw was written by Bruce R. Cordell, and was published in January 2005. Cover art was by Wayne Reynolds, with interior art by Steve Prescott.
