= The Strange =

Fantasy tabletop role-playing game

- Cover by Matt Stawicki
- Designers: Bruce Cordell; Monte Cook
- Publishers: Monte Cook Games
- Publication: 2014; 12 years ago
- Genres: Science fantasy
- Systems: Cypher System introduced by Numenera

The Strange is a science fantasy tabletop role-playing game, written by Bruce Cordell and Monte Cook, and published by Monte Cook Games.

== History ==
The Strange was published in 2014 by Monte Cook Games, as a result of a crowd funding campaign in 2013. The campaign raised $418,478 from 2,883 backers.

== Game ==
=== Setting ===
The Strange is set in modern-day Earth but allows a GM to take their stories through many different "recursions", worlds based frequently on literary creations.

=== Game mechanics ===
The Strange uses the Cypher System originally developed for Numenera, which is played primarily using a d20. The GM sets the initial difficulty and will relay that to the player prior to the roll to help them determine their course of action. The player may decide to "effort" to lower the level of difficulty prior to the roll.

== Products ==
Title	Authors	Date	Pages	Formats	ISBN
The Paradox Room	Monte Cook, Bruce Cordell	October 2013	X	epub, mobi, PDF	
An anthology of two short stories released with the Kickstarter to illustrate the setting
Tales from the Strange	Bruce Cordell, Monte Cook, Shanna Germain	December 2013	X	epub, mobi, PDF	
An anthology of short stories set in The Strange setting
The Strange Corebook	Bruce Cordell & Monte Cook	August 15, 2014	416	Print, Deluxe, PDF	
The Strange Player's Guide	Bruce Cordell & Monte Cook	August 15, 2014	64	Print, PDF	
Book focused on the player characters; subset of content from the Corebook
The Strange XP Card Deck	Monte Cook	August 15, 2014	30 cards	Print, PDF	
Cards representing a character's XP points
The Strange Cypher Card Deck	Monte Cook	August 15, 2014	120 cards	Print, PDF	
Cards representing cypher items available in game
The Dark Spiral	Bruce Cordell	October 2014	96	Print, PDF	
Collection of interwoven adventurers
The Strange Bestiary	Bruce Cordell, Monte Cook, & Robert J. Schwalb	November 2014	160	Print, PDF	
A collection of creatures from various recursions in The Strange
The Strange Creature Card Deck	Monte Cook	November 2014	100 cards	Print, PDF	
Cards representing creatures in The Strange
In Translation: The Strange Character Options	Bruce Cordell	April 2015	96	Print, PDF	
Additional character options for The Strange

== Reception ==
The Strange won the 2015 Silver Ennie Award for "Best Interior Art", "Best Game", and "Best Setting".
