= Eric L. Boyd =

American role-playing game designer

- Born: Eric L. Boyd
- Occupation: Game designer
- Writing career
- Genre: Role-playing games

Eric L. Boyd is a software engineer who also writes material for the Dungeons & Dragons role-playing game.

== Career ==
Eric L. Boyd has written articles and books for the Greyhawk setting, and has co-authored a number of Forgotten Realms campaign supplements. Some of his works include Demihuman Deities, (1998), Faiths and Pantheons (2002) with Erik Mona, and Serpent Kingdoms (2004) with Ed Greenwood and Darrin Drader. He also contributed to the Forgotten Realms Player's Guide for D&D 4th Edition. He first contributed to the Pathfinder Chronicles campaign setting in June 2008.

Boyd used to run a campaign set in the Forgotten Realms, specifically a play by email set in Waterdeep, City of Splendors, revolving around the Waterdhavian nobility called "Hidden Splendors". However, Hidden Splendors is currently on hiatus. More recently he has started up the "Six Swords" campaign set in the Sembian city of Yhaunn.

Trenton Webb of British RPG magazine Arcane, declared that "Julia Martin and Eric L. Boyd deserve medals for what they've achieved with Faiths & Avatars. They probably also deserve professional psychiatric help for even attemption to codify and clarify the twisted theology of Abeir-Toril. The resultant work is exhaustive. It's also exhausting."
