= Scott Roller =

- Known for: Fantasy art

Scott Roller is an artist whose work has appeared in role-playing games.

== Career ==
Roller is known for Dungeons & Dragons work including interior art for Monster Manual II (2002), Savage Species (2003), Arms and Equipment Guide (2003), Ghostwalk (2003), the revised 3.5 Dungeon Master's Guide (2003), Complete Divine (2004), Races of Stone (2004), Red Hand of Doom (2006), and Tome of Magic (2006).
