= Ghostwalk =

Tabletop role-playing game supplement

- Author: Monte Cook and Sean K. Reynolds
- Genre: Role-playing games
- Publisher: Wizards of the Coast
- Publication date: June 2003
- Media type: Hardcover
- Pages: 224
- ISBN: 978-0-7869-2834-7

Ghostwalk is a role-playing game sourcebook published by Wizards of the Coast in 2003, for the 3rd edition of the Dungeons & Dragons fantasy role-playing game. The book introduces and describes the campaign setting of the same name. Unlike settings such as Forgotten Realms or Dragonlance, Ghostwalk was designed to be released as a single book containing all the material for the world.

== Contents ==
The central locale for the Ghostwalk setting is a city called Manifest, a mausoleum city built atop a geological feature known as the Veil of Souls. The Veil of Souls leads the spirits of the departed to the True Afterlife.

In the immediate surroundings of the city of Manifest, the ghosts of the dead may cross the barrier into the land of the living, and interact with their loved ones as translucent beings composed of ectoplasm. The bodies of these ghosts are marked by whatever injuries killed them, and they are often driven by a craving for some aspect of the living world, such as food or music. A manifested ghost may fairly easily be returned to his body by resurrection magic, so in the City of Manifest, a character may die many times and be returned to their body with no harmful side effects. The one danger in exploring the other side of death as a ghost is the Calling, an unshakable urge that overcomes ghosts at some point in their afterlife driving them to forsake the world and pass into the True Afterlife. Such a transition is permanent and marks the end of a character.

While all sentient races have spirits, only the human and demihuman races (human, half-elf, half-orc, elf, gnome, dwarf, and halfling) in the setting can travel to Manifest and manifest as ghosts. Many races, particularly the serpentine Yuan-Ti are jealous of this ability and have sought to destroy Manifest throughout its history. Their efforts have caused the city to be razed and rebuilt a myriad number of times, resulting in an underworld of forgotten catacombs surrounding the Veil of Souls which is a common call to adventure in the world.

=== Chapter summary ===
Introduction: Includes information on the campaign options and the general concept of Ghostwalk and the city of Manifest itself.

1. All About Ghosts: Contains information on the nature of Ghosts presented in the book as well as their characteristics and powers. The two ghost classes are introduced: The Eidolon and Eidoloncer as well as several prestige classes involving ghosts. New Skills and Feats are also introduced as well as new equipment, spells and magical items.
2. The City of Manifest: Includes information about the City itself, its history, and new gods unique to the setting. Information on adventures, the city's layout, and workings is also provided.
3. The Ghostwalk Campaign: Provides information about how to run adventures in the setting, themes, and frequently encountered enemies.
4. Countries: Documents countries that exist around the city of Manifest and their relationship to the city.
5. Monsters: Contains several new monsters for use in the campaign:
  - Artaaglith (Demon)
  - Bonesinger (Template)
  - Dread Ram
  - Ectoplasmic Vermin
  - Fire Spectre
  - Ghost (Template)
  - Ghosteater
  - Monstrous Vampire (Template)
  - Mumia (Template)
  - Necroplasm
  - Spectral Seed
  - Spirit Tree
  - Undead Martyr
  - Yuan-Ti (Template)
6. Adventures: Contains seven adventures to begin in the city of Manifest that range from level one to twelve.

== Publication history ==
Ghostwalk was published in June 2003, and was written by Monte Cook and Sean K. Reynolds. Cover art was by Brom, with interior art by Thomas Baxa, Dennis Cramer, Michael Dutton, Emily Fiegenschuh, Jeremy Jarvis, David Martin, Puddnhead, Vinod Rams, Wayne Reynolds, Scott Roller, Richard Sardinha, and Ron Spencer.

Sean Reynolds explained the origin of the idea to make it possible to play a dead player character as a ghost: "I think it was just a matter of Monte and me understanding that one of the least fun parts of the game is when a character dies. Not only is there a feeling of loss regarding the character, but also the player doesn't have anything to do until a new character can be brought in. We thought a campaign where a character's death wouldn't be the end of play for that character or player would be a neat twist on standard D&D".

The supplement received two web enhancements on the Wizards of the Coast website both written by Sean K. Reynolds. The first was composed of cut content from the book, as well as the mini-campaign used to test the setting while the second is an update from 3rd edition to the shortly released 3.5, though it also includes a map of the setting that was cut from the book.

== Reception ==
Craig Shackleton for SF Site wrote a fairly positive review of the Ghostwalk sourcebook, complementing its unique twist on the common fantasy conventions, while noting the coming obsolesce of the original 3rd edition system it was written in.

== Reviews ==
- Black Gate #7
- Realms of Fantasy
