= Enemies and Allies =

2001 role-playing game accessory

- Enemies and Allies book cover
- Author: Jeff Grubb, David Noonan, Skip Williams, and Bruce R. Cordell
- Genre: Role-playing games
- Publisher: Wizards of the Coast
- Publication date: October 2001
- Media type: Book
- Pages: 64
- ISBN: 978-0-7869-1852-2

Enemies and Allies is an accessory for the 3rd edition of the Dungeons & Dragons fantasy role-playing game.

== Contents ==
Enemies and Allies is a supplement which includes statistics and descriptions for a large variety of pregenerated non-player characters for 3rd edition Dungeons & Dragons.

== Publication history ==
Enemies and Allies was published in October 2001, and was designed by Bruce R. Cordell, Jeff Grubb, David Noonan, and Skip Williams. Cover art is by Jeff Easley, with interior art by Dennis Cramer, Todd Lockwood, Wayne Reynolds, and Sam Wood.

== Reception ==
Shannon Appelcline notes that the NPC book Enemies and Allies was one of many early D&D third edition releases which "did not have a strong setting".
