= Arms and Equipment Guide =

Dungeons & Dragons supplement

The Arms and Equipment Guide is the name of two supplementary rule books for the Dungeons & Dragons fantasy role-playing game. Each describes various equipment that can be used in a campaign.

== 2nd edition ==
Arms and Equipment Guide
- Author: Grant Boucher, Troy Christensen, Jon Pickens, John Terra, and Scott Davis
- Genre: Role-playing game
- Publisher: TSR
- Publication date: 1991

=== Contents ===
The original Arms and Equipment Guide explored and expanded the second edition Advanced Dungeons & Dragons Player's Handbook equipment lists in detail.

=== Publication history ===
The original Arms and Equipment Guide was designed by Grant Boucher, Troy Christensen, Jon Pickens, John Terra, and Scott Davis. It was intended for the 2nd edition of Advanced Dungeons & Dragons, and was published in 1991. The book was edited by Anne Brown and Jon Pickens. Interior artists included Daniel Horne, Erik Olson, Keith Parkinson, Michael Weaver, Kelly Freas, Laura Freas, Mark Nelson, Karl Waller, Valerie Valusek, Stephen D. Sullivan, Ken Frank, and Ned Dameron.

=== Reception ===
Keith Eisenbeis reviewed the product in the February 1992 issue of White Wolf. He rated it at 2 of 5 points, calling it "a disappointing product" in that it was useful, but fell short in the amount of information and quality of illustrations for the cost.

Rick Swan reviewed Arms and Equipment Guide for Dragon magazine No. 192 (April 1993). He suggested this book "has the answers" for "AD&D game players baffled by the differences between chain mail and brigandine armor, and who don't know a bardiche from a barbell". He said that the designers "probe the mysteries of the Player's Handbook equipment lists in lavish detail. Practical applications complement the colorful descriptions, making this particularly useful for players who want to know exactly how weaponblack or stirrups affect the game". He complained of too many unlabeled illustrations and the absence of an index, saying that they "mar this otherwise first-rate reference".

DieHard GameFan said that "I can't think of any circumstances where I would not recommend this book. It succinctly and authoritatively describes so many fantasy objects taken from medieval eras that, unless you already know all of this stuff and more, would simply be necessary if you even want to know what you are talking about when discussing armor, weapons, and equipment."

==== Reviews ====
- Casus Belli #84 (Dec 1994)

== 3rd edition ==
Arms and Equipment Guide
- Cover of Arms and Equipment Guide
- Author: Eric Cagle, Jesse Decker, Jeff Quick, Rich Redman, James Wyatt
- Illustrator: Eric Peterson (cover); Dennis Cramer, David Day, David Martin, Scott Roller, Sam Wood (interior art)
- Language: English
- Subject: Dungeons & Dragons supplement on items
- Genre: Role-playing game
- Publisher: Wizards of the Coast
- Publication date: March 2003
- Publication place: U.S.
- Media type: Print (Hardback)
- Pages: 160
- ISBN: 978-0-7869-2649-7

The d20 system, 3rd edition version of the Arms and Equipment Guide was printed in 2003 and was designed by Eric Cagle, Jesse Decker, Jeff Quick, and James Wyatt. Cover art was by Eric Peterson, with interior art by Dennis Cramer, David Day, David Martin, Scott Roller, and Sam Wood. This book has an introduction, six chapters, and an appendix containing random treasure tables. Chapters are "Weapons and Armor", "Adventuring Gear", "Vehicles", "Hirelings and Creatures", "Magical Items", and "Special Magical Items".

=== "Weapons and Armor" ===
The first section of the book is concerned with mundane weapons and armor. It introduces many new weapons, such as the Gyrspike, a sword with a spiked ball attached to the hilt by a chain. As well, the section lists the different weapons used throughout the different cultures and time periods, and the names they were known by. It describes several different materials for use in creating weapons or armor, such as bronze and coral.

=== "Adventuring Gear" ===
This second lists the details and price of clothing, candles, alchemical items, and other adventuring necessities; the section consists of approximately 145 items. Also included is a discussion on economic systems in the fantasy world.

=== "Vehicles" ===
A wide range of vehicles are discussed in this section, from nautical wind-powered ships and horse-drawn carriages, to zeppelins and triceratops. Rules are given on how to control mounts, and what happens when two vehicles crash. Several magical items are given for the use in vehicles, such as the Wind-Favored Sails.

=== "Hirelings and Creatures" ===
Prices are given for hirelings of various skill levels. Statistics are also given for cheap to expensive mercenaries, including some fantasy creatures, such as pixies. A section on pets discusses the training of animals and legendary creatures as guard animals and pets. Several new creatures are introduced, such as the Climbdog. Rules concerning mounts, several magic items relating to animal training, and new mounts are proposed.

=== "Magical Items" ===
Many new potions, rings, staffs, rods, and wondrous items are detailed in this chapter, including a new type of potion called Elixir Armor. Made from the essence of creatures with natural armor, it grants the drinker with an armor class bonus.

==== Weapons ====
A large part of the book focuses on magical weapons. Three pages of weapon abilities is followed by 24 pages of specific magical weapons.

=== "Special Magical Items" ===
This section contains new intelligent, cursed, and artifact items, the most notable of which include the Regalia of Might and the Rod of Seven Parts.

== Reviews ==
- Coleção Dragão Brasil
- Realms of Fantasy
