= Faiths & Avatars =

1996 role-playing game supplement by Julia Martin and Eric L. Boyd

- Author: Julia Martin and Eric L. Boyd
- Language: English
- Publisher: Wizards of the Coast
- Publication date: 26 March 1996
- Pages: 191
- ISBN: 978-0-7869-0384-9
- OCLC: 35362353

Faiths & Avatars is an Advanced Dungeons & Dragons Forgotten Realms campaign expansion book.

== Contents ==
Faiths & Avatars is a supplement which lists and details information about the gods of the Faerûnian pantheon, even those who have died. The book provides 45 deity descriptions, and four new priest sub-classes. Each god has a description, game statistics, and a personal history, as well as its Avatar that the god uses as a manifestation in the mortal world in a form that characters would most likely encounter. The faiths section of each god details the structure of their church, religious dogma, daily activities, major worship centers, prominent religious orders, priest vestments, adventuring clothes, holy days and significant ceremonies. The book presents specific spells available only to the followers of the individual gods, which match the nature and spheres of influence for each god. The last ten pages of the book outline four priest sub-classes: crusaders, monks, mystic and shamans.

This book contains an exhaustive list of all the Lesser through Greater human gods and their churches. The supplement provides numerous spells and special powers for clerics of each different faith. Faiths & Avatars details the clergy, the ethos, and important information to depict the Faerûnian pantheon in a campaign setting.

== Publication history ==
The book was designed by Julia Martin with Eric L. Boyd, and additional design by Ed Greenwood, L. Richard Baker III, and David Wise. Cover art is by Alan Pollack, with interior illustrations by Earl Geier and color plates by Victoria Lisi and Ned Dameron.

This book is first in a series of sourcebooks about the Faerûnian pantheon, followed by Powers & Pantheons and Demihuman Deities.

== Reception ==
Trenton Webb reviewed Faiths & Avatars for Arcane magazine, rating it an 8 out of 10 overall. He declared that "Julia Martin and Eric L. Boyd deserve medals for what they've achieved with Faiths & Avatars. They probably also deserve professional psychiatric help for even attemption to codify and clarify the twisted theology of Abeir-Toril. The resultant work is exhaustive. It's also exhausting." He found that the book "ignores the non-human deities, but by the time you've waded through this weighty work you'll be glad it does". He referred to the god descriptions, the new sub-classes, and the "(hilarious) ninepage cleric fashion show" as a "guarantee of value". He calls the introduction "remarkably concise (if somewhat brain-mangling)" and says that the book then "dips straight into what makes each god worth worshipping. This is no Deities & Demigods-style glorified Monster Manual - in which the gods were dismissed with single paragraph descriptions, a pretty picture and an outrageous set of stats - but a collection of information so thorough that it makes your brain hurt." Webb calls the gods' personal histories "deadpan [...] telling which gods they hate, who they support and how much attention they pay to their followers. All very solid, and just what you'd expect." Regarding the avatars, he says: "Oddly, these are short descriptions but, since they're backed by the in-depth god info, there's more than enough information here to create truly terrifying encounters for those characters who are sufficiently cocky (or stupid) to tackle deities head-to-head." He goes on to say: "It's faith, however, that really makes gods great and this book good. Ordinarily, playing a cleric character is difficult because there's precious little rules-based help in AD&D for those trying to take their characters beyond the role of magical nurses. The only experience most of us have of religion is the modern Christian model, which is of no use when your day-to-day activities include direct physical violence. It's even less help when your priest worships a god who personifies evil, cruelty and downright nastiness." Webb commented that with the faiths section for each god, "Faiths & Avatars provides players with loads of inspiration and plenty of guidance for roleplaying". He called the sub-classes the "final accomplishment of Faiths & Avatars", but felt that they were "almost dismissed in an appendix-like form", saying: "Although these descriptions are a little too concise for their own good, the sub-classes they deal with are welcome additions that work well with the Faiths & Avatars system. It's especially nice to see the return of the Oriental Adventures-style monk."

Aside from the sheer size of the subject matter, Webb outlines what he considers two major problems with the book: "Functionally, the print's too small and the background tints are too dark, which makes reading a chore and cross-referencing difficult. In addition, it's stylistically po-faced, overly pious and almost puritanical about the subject matter. There's no excitement or enjoyment to be had here." He goes on to say that "Faiths & Avatars is scarily serious and seriously scary. Personally, I'd be terrified of implementing it in a campaign for fear of having missed some vital link and consequently undermining both my campaign and the Faerûnian pantheon. But if you've got powerful characters running around one of the Forgotten Realms you'd be doing your players a disservice if you didn't toy with this hi-octane, high-power playing aid." Webb concluded by saying: "Reading Faiths & Avatars is a real struggle, but you'll plough on because the ideas are good, the research thorough, and because it offers a lot to any Forgotten Realms campaign. Faiths & Avatars is the bible for the Forgotten Realms. Unfortunately, just like many real-world religions, it takes itself far too seriously."

== Reviews ==
- Casus Belli #96
