= Obsidian: The Age of Judgement =

- Publisher: Apophis Consortium
- Publication date: 1999

Obsidian: The Age of Judgement is a 1999 role-playing game published by Apophis Consortium.

== Gameplay ==
Obsidian: The Age of Judgement is a game in which humanity defends against the forces of Hell in the year 2299.

== Publication history ==
Shannon Appelcline noted that when Ron Edwards was developing Sorcerer, "at the 2000 Gen Con Game Fair - while most of the industry was gawking over the release of the third edition of Dungeons & Dragons (2000) - Edwards' eye was caught by something else: Obsidian: The Age of Justice (1999), an attractive hardcover RPG independently published by the Apophis Consortium. Edwards decided that if they could publish an RPG while retaining ownership, he could do the same, and so he set to work on doing exactly that." Dav Harnish, one of the authors of Obsidian, did one of the earliest reviews of Sorcerer on RPGnet.

== Reviews ==
- Pyramid
- Backstab
- The Fantasy Roleplaying Gamer's Bible
- Rue Morgue #12
