= The Illithiad =

- Publisher: TSR
- Publication date: 1998
- ISBN: 0-7869-1206-5

The Illithiad is a 1998 role-playing game supplement published by TSR for Advanced Dungeons & Dragons.

== Plot summary ==
The Illithiad is a supplement of information about mind flayers.

== Reviews ==
- InQuest #39
- Backstab #9
- Casus Belli #114
