= A Guide to the Astral Plane =

Tabletop role-playing game supplement

- Genre: Tabletop role-playing games
- Publisher: TSR
- Publication date: 1996

A Guide to the Astral Plane is an accessory for the 2nd edition of the Advanced Dungeons & Dragons fantasy tabletop role-playing game, published by TSR, Inc. in 1996.

== Contents ==
A Guide to the Astral Plane is a supplement which explains rules for astral travel, combat with no gravity and spellcasting in the astral plane. The middle section of the book provides information on the indigenous Githyanki, which is proposed as an optional player character race. The last section of the book details other creatures that live on the plane, and describes a few locations.

== Reception ==
Trenton Webb reviewed A Guide to the Astral Plane for Arcane magazine, rating it an 8 out of 10 overall. He quips that: "The problem with Planescape is that it inspires an almost ceaseless tide of high-quality accessories, and such creativity puts a strain on both the finances and campaigns of referees. The Guide to the Astral Plane further exacerbates this problem." He comments that "The Guide breathes life into what had hitherto been little more than a planar motorway. Essentially infinite and filled with few 'solid locations' or indigenous species, the Astral Plane should by rights be a dull place. Yet with some deft imaginative touches and sleight of logic, the guide transforms this dead zone into a wonderfully different 'world'." Webb adds: "By expanding the accepted 'physics' of the Astral plane and applying classic Planescape thinking, the Silver Void is made solid and comprehensible. Rules for astral travel, zero-gravity combat and spellcasting are crisply and clearly explained - all concepts that will add extra spice to normal play and properly emphasise the unique nature of this inner space." He continues "For these rules to have any practical value, though, the Astral Plane has to be worth exploring. And for that it needs people and places. The mid-section of the guide's response is more information than even an Illithid would want on the Githyanki - the indigenous species on the Astral. Such depth is necessary because it's suggested as an optional player race, but while as non-player characters the Githyanki boast some excellent twists and Astral-specific spells, as PCs they would be little more than dextrous, not to mention ugly, egg layers." Webb concludes his review by saying, "The final section of the guide deals with those other beasties who make the void their home and the few areas that actually 'exist.. Many of the monsters have been met before in other Planescape sourcebooks, but the locations are excellent, original work - the Bonecloud (a zombie swarm) and Divinity Leech (a fortress that sucks energy from the corpses of gods) take the bizarre nature of this plane to its logical extreme. All of the locations are dutifully different and the majority are truly inspired, so they're well worth running the void for."

== Reviews ==
- Pyramid #25
