= Darkvision (novel) =

2006 novel by Bruce R. Cordell

- Cover of the first edition
- Author: Bruce Cordell
- Language: English
- Series: The Wizards
- Genre: Fantasy novel
- Published: 2006
- Publication place: United States
- Media type: Print (Paperback)
- ISBN: 978-0-7869-4017-2
- Preceded by: Bloodwalk
- Followed by: Frostfell

Darkvision is a fantasy novel by Bruce Cordell, set in the world of the Forgotten Realms, and based on the Dungeons & Dragons role-playing game. It is the third novel in "The Wizards" series. It was published in paperback in September 2006.

== Plot summary ==
Darkvision is a novel in which the sorceress Ususi runs away to the outside world that her people abandoned long ago, in search of relics they once possessed.

== Reception ==
Pat Ferrara of mania.com comments: "Another stand-alone novel of The Wizards series, Darkvision hits the scene under the experienced wing of Forgotten Realms guru Bruce R. Cordell."
