= Den of Thieves (Dungeons & Dragons) =

1996 role-playing game accessory

- Genre: Role-playing games
- Publisher: TSR
- Publication date: 1996

Den of Thieves is an accessory for the 2nd edition of the Advanced Dungeons & Dragons fantasy role-playing game, published in 1996.

== Contents ==
Den of Thieves is a supplement which presents a sample thieves' guild, detailing its major characters, as well as their political relationships and their personal strengths. This guild receives income from its various criminal activities, each of which is organized into crews and overseen by a member who keeps the others from risking the wealth or health of the guild as a whole, and these include burglary and pick pocketing, counterfeiting, forgery, extortion, muggings, blackmail, prostitution, gambling, loan sharking, smuggling, protection rackets, and exotic dancers. This supplement also comes with a number of quick adventures.

== Publication history ==
Den of Thieves was published by TSR, Inc. in 1996.

== Reception ==
Trenton Webb reviewed Den of Thieves for Arcane magazine, rating it a 6 out of 10 overall. He commented that D&D has a long-standing crime problem. Not in any 'hang 'em high' Tory MP way, but in the fact that thieves' guilds have traditionally only popped up as two-dimensional plot devices that supply rent-a-rogues. Den Of Thieves attempts to steal away all the best criminal ideas and stash them in a single work." He felt that the book "presents a 'theoretical' model by way of an example guild", but that the characters "aren't staggeringly original creations - each being little more than an exceptional skill backed by a cut-out-and-keep personality – but the guild's complex power structure offers plenty of scope for inter-faction fighting in which players can become embroiled." He notes that the example guild follows "the familiar Mafia model" in that each "business" is run by a "Capo". Considering the book "Detailed and thorough", Webb considers the book "so eager to legitimise the functional aspects of thieves' guilds that it coughs up tables for everything from Random Smuggling Incidents to a system for running pursuits through unmapped city streets. Yet it lacks the single most appealing aspect of the gangster myth – glamour!" He concluded that the "quick-hit" adventures which "are intended to exhibit what a guild can do fail to convey the necessary style. They work, but a multi-facted and multi-layered gang of high-class thieves like this should exude the swaggering arrogance of the Krays or Capone. Attempts are made to add energy with a Zorro-like Cwl and super spy Shalamell, but these are shrouded in too much mystery to be useful." Webb felt that players attempting to build their own guild on this book's model "would find this mob-DIY kit tedious and overly time consuming. There's too much emphasis on the book-keeping and too little on pulling the 'big-heist' that true thieves must crave, for the suggest system to be fun. The crimes are a little too clean, the political puppetry a little too vague, and the profits a little too low." Webb concluded the review by saying: "The supplement's example thieves' guild does, however, provide a useful off-the-shelf resource for referees to use in city-based gaming sessions. It is a powerful enough organisation that can legitimately emerge from the shadows with sufficient clout to pull even hardened parties in and make them an offer they can't refuse."
