= Bruce Cordell =

American novelist and game designer

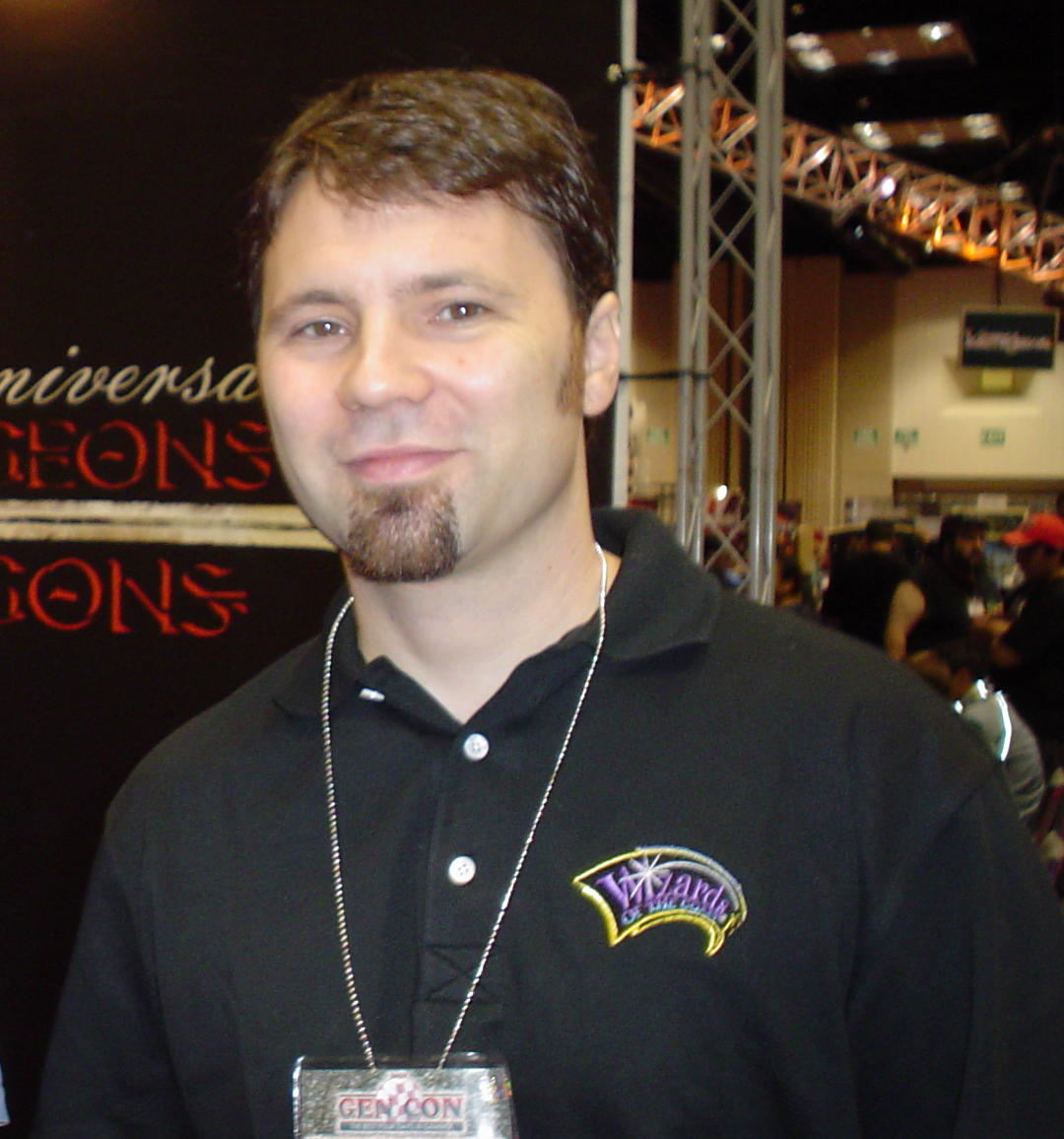
- Cordell in 2004
- Born: Bruce Robert Cordell; Watertown, South Dakota, U.S.
- Education: University of Colorado
- Occupations: Game designer, novelist
- Writing career
- Genre: Role-playing games

Bruce Robert Cordell is an American author of roleplaying games and fantasy novels. He has worked on Dungeons & Dragons games for Wizards of the Coast. He won the Origins Award for Return to the Tomb of Horrors and has also won several ENnies. He lives in Seattle.

== Early life and education ==
Bruce Cordell played Dungeons & Dragons as a youth, and even recalled playing the original Tomb of Horrors adventure with future fellow game designer Monte Cook when they were in high school together. Cordell was a wrestler and a debater, and also earned a degree in biology from the University of Colorado. Cordell once worked in the biopharmaceutical industry, where he learned to synthesize DNA.

== Roleplaying work ==
Cordell worked on freelance game design while working in the scientific field, and was eventually hired as a full-time game designer by TSR in 1995. Cordell created the Far Realm for the adventure The Gates of Firestorm Peak (1996). He authored the Sea Devils Adventure Trilogy, The Illithiad, The Shattered Circle, Bastion of Faith, the Dungeon Builder's Guidebook, and the adventures Die Vecna Die!, Return to the Tomb of Horrors, and Return to White Plume Mountain for the AD&D game, as well as the Tangents sourcebook and The Killing Jar adventure for the Alternity game. Cordell and Steve Miller worked on Die Vecna Die! (2000) together, an original adventure that brought an end to the Advanced Dungeons & Dragons line. Cordell was also one of the designers working on the first new adventures for the third edition Dungeons & Dragons game, beginning with The Sunless Citadel. Cordell and Rich Baker wrote a new version of the Gamma World Roleplaying Game (2010), which was based on the fourth edition D&D rules.

He won the Origins Award for Return to the Tomb of Horrors, and ENnies for Mindscapes, If Thoughts Could Kill, and his work on the Manual of the Planes. Cordell wrote the novels Oath of Nerull, Lady of Poison, Darkvision, Stardeep, and the Abolethic Sovereignty trilogy. Short stories he's written have appeared in various anthologies, including "Black Arrow" in Realms of War.

Cordell's RPG work includes many scenarios and sourcebooks; many of which are directly or indirectly concerned with monsters of a Lovecraftian bent (particularly mind flayers and psionics).

Cordell often referenced certain characters, ideas, and organizations in his RPG works, creating continuity between works. For example, The Illithiad references the character of Strom Wakeman and the organization known as the Arcane Order (an organization detailed in another of Cordell's works, College of Wizardry). Wakeman was quoted occasionally in Planescape books by Cordell, such as A Guide to the Ethereal Plane, and was instrumental to the course of events in the adventure Dawn of the Overmind (books which were themselves also connected through a phenomenon called an ether gap). The Arcane Order returned in Tome and Blood as a detailed organization and the basis of a prestige class.

Most of Cordell's work for Malhavoc Press has followed similar patterns, creating a story arc across When the Sky Falls, If Thoughts Could Kill, and Hyperconscious, connected by the god-like Dark Plea and, to a lesser extent, the kureshim race. In an interview with Monte Cook, Cordell himself said that he included "subtle story threads that connect seemingly unrelated projects".

Cordell co-designed the fourth edition Forgotten Realms Campaign Guide, and Gamma World Seventh Edition.

After working for a few years as a designer on the fifth edition of D&D, Cordell left Wizards in July 2013. In August of the same year he joined Monte Cook at Cook's company Monte Cook Games, LLC (also called MCG) as Senior Designer. Not long after, MCG Kickstarted another RPG, The Strange. The Strange, co-written by Cordell and Cook, was published in August 2014.

== Novels ==
- Myth of the Maker (a novel based in The Strange setting), April 2017
- Spinner of Lies (Forgotten Realms novel, #2 in the Sword of the Gods series), June 2012
- Sword of the Gods (Forgotten Realms novel, #1 in the Sword of the Gods series/Abyssal Plague tie-in novel), April 2011
- Key of Stars (Forgotten Realms novel, #3 in the Abolethic Sovereignty series), September 2010
- City of Torment (Forgotten Realms novel, #2 in the Abolethic Sovereignty series), September 2009
- Plague of Spells (Forgotten Realms novel, #1 in the Abolethic Sovereignty series), December 2008
- Stardeep (Forgotten Realms Novel, #3 in The Dungeons series), November 2007
- Darkvision (Forgotten Realms novel, #3 in The Wizards series), 2006
- Lady of Poison (Forgotten Realms novel, #1 in The Priests series), 2005
- Oath of Nerull (as T. H. Lain), 2004

== Short stories ==
- Wandering Stones, in the Forgotten Realms anthology Realms of the Dead, Forgotten Realms Anthology, January 2010
- Black Arrow, in the Forgotten Realms anthology Realms of War, March 2008
- Not all that Tempts, Dragon's Return, Malhavoc Press, 2005
- Hollows of the Heart, Children of the Rune, Malhavoc Press, 2004

== Role-playing games ==
=== Adventures ===
==== 2nd Edition AD&D ====
- The Gates of Firestorm Peak (1996)
- Evil Tide (1997)
- Night of the Shark (1997)
- Sea of Blood (1997)
- Return to the Tomb of Horrors (1998)
- A Darkness Gathering (1998)
- Masters of Eternal Night (1998)
- Dawn of the Overmind (1998)
- The Shattered Circle (1998)
- Return to White Plume Mountain (1999)
- Die Vecna Die! (with Steve Miller, 2000)
- Reverse Dungeon (with John D. Rateliff, 2000)

==== 3rd Edition D&D ====
- The Sunless Citadel (2000)
- Heart of Nightfang Spire (2001)
- Bastion of Broken Souls (2002)
- Grasp of the Emerald Claw (2005)
- The Sinister Spire (2007)

==== 4th Edition D&D ====
- Keep on the Shadowfell (2008)
- Assault on Nightwyrm Fortress (2009)
- Death's Reach (2009)
- Kingdom of the Ghouls (2009)

==== 5th Edition D&D (OGL) ====
- Where the Machines Wait for Numenera (2021)

==== Cypher System ====
===== The Strange =====
- The Strange (2014)
- The Strange: The Dark Spiral (2014)
- The Strange: Eschatology Code (2014)
- Encyclopedia of Impossible Things (2016)

===== Other settings =====
- Gods of the Fall (2016)

=== Sourcebooks ===
==== 2nd Edition AD&D ====
- College of Wizardry (1998)
- Dungeon Builder's Guidebook (1998)
- Bastion of Faith (1999)
- The Illithiad (1998)

==== 3rd Edition D&D ====
- Enemies and Allies (2001)
- Psionics Handbook (2001)
- Epic Level Handbook
- Tome and Blood (2001)
- Underdark (2003)
- Expanded Psionics Handbook (2004)
- Complete Psionics (2006)

===== Third-Party D20 system sourcebooks =====
- If Thoughts Could Kill (Malhavoc Press, 2002)
- Hyperconscious (Malhavoc Press, 2004)

==== 4th Edition D&D ====
- Forgotten Realms Campaign Guide (2008)
- Draconomicon I: Chromatic Dragons (2008)
- Open Grave: Secrets of the Undead (2009)

===== 5th Edition D&D =====
- Player's Handbook (2014)
- Dungeon Master's Guide (2014)
- Monster Manual (2014)

==== Cypher System ====
- The Strange (2014)
- The Strange Players Guide (2014)
- Numenera: The Ninth World Bestiary (2014)
- The Strange Bestiary (2014)
- Jade Colossus: Ruins of the Prior Worlds (2017)
- Numenera 2: Discovery & Destiny (2018)

== Podcasts ==
- RPG Countdown: Cordell appeared on these episodes: January 28, 2009 (Open Grave: Secrets of the Undead), March 25, 2009 (Assault on Nightwyrm Fortress).
