= Lars Grant-West =

American artist

Lars Grant-West is an American artist whose work has appeared in role-playing games. He currently teaches illustration at the Rhode Island School of Design.

== Early life and education ==
Lars Grant-West was born in Brooklyn. He attended New York City's School of Visual Arts. As of 1997, he lives in North Scituate, Rhode Island.

== Works ==
Lars Grant-West has produced interior illustrations for role-playing game books since 2000. Much of his work has appeared in Dungeons & Dragons books in the game's third edition, such as the Player's Handbook (2000), Dungeon Master's Guide (2000), Psionics Handbook (2001), Faiths and Pantheons (2002), Epic Level Handbook (2002), Monster Manual II (2002), Deities and Demigods (2002), Book of Vile Darkness (2002), Fiend Folio (2003), and Draconomicon (2003). Grant-West has also illustrated books for the Obsidian RPG, as well as other d20 System games.

Grant-West also illustrated cards for the Magic: The Gathering collectible card game.

He has also worked on special projects for the Roger Williams Park Zoo in Providence, Rhode Island.
