= Psionics (Dungeons & Dragons) =

Dungeons & Dragons gameplay aspect

In the Dungeons & Dragons fantasy role-playing game, psionics are a form of supernatural power similar to, but distinct from, arcane and divine magic. Psionics are manifested purely by mental discipline. Psionics were introduced in the original supplement Eldritch Wizardry. Psionics have appeared as part of the core rules beginning with Advanced Dungeons & Dragons 1st edition.

== Overview ==
In 2nd, 3rd and 3.5 editions, psionics are divided into five or six disciplines, or groupings of powers. In 2nd edition, Psionicists gain access to additional disciplines as they advance in level. In 3.5 edition, several psionic character classes are forced to choose one, thereby losing access to the most potent powers of the others. In 2nd edition, each power is tied to an ability score (generally Constitution, Intelligence or Wisdom). In 3rd edition, each discipline is tied to an ability score; and in 3.5 edition, all powers use the same ability score, either Intelligence, Wisdom, or Charisma depending on the user's class.

Earlier editions also included psionic combat. This was eliminated in 3.5 edition. Attack and defense modes were converted into standard psionic powers.

Prior to 3rd edition, magic and psionics are treated as distinct from each other. For example, the Detect Invisibility spell will penetrate both magical and psionic invisibility, as it detects invisibility in general, while the Detect Magic spell will not detect psionic effects, as it is restricted to magical effects and psionic effects are non-magical. In 3rd and 3.5 editions, the standard psionics system incorporates psionics–magic transparency, which treats psionic energy and magic as mutually and equally vulnerable to a dispel magic spell or a dispel psionics power.

In 4th edition, the psionic power source is one of several supernatural power sources. A character's powers generally do not interact with other characters' powers based on power source. As an example, the 4th edition version of Dispel Magic can dispel any effect with the Conjuration or Zone keyword, regardless of power source.

== The disciplines ==
- Clairsentience
- Metacreativity -- The ability to create objects or living beings.
- Metapsionics -- Powers which augment other psionic powers
- Psychokinesis
- Psychometabolism -- Powers which change the physical properties of some creature, thing, or condition, including animal affinity and psionic revivify.
- Psychoportation: Psychoportation powers move the user or objects through space and/or time.
- Telepathy

== History ==
=== Original Dungeons & Dragons ===
Psionics were first introduced in the supplement Eldritch Wizardry (1976).

=== Advanced Dungeons & Dragons First Edition ===
Optional rules for psionics were included in the original Player's Handbook, which presented them as an optional ability available to many monsters and to players who could qualify with lucky rolls. There was no specific character class that specialized in psionics, although an unofficial one, the Psionicist, was introduced in Dragon Magazine issue #78. Much of the rules mechanics for psionic combat were found separately in the Dungeon Masters Guide.

=== Second Edition ===
Psionics rules first appeared in The Complete Psionics Handbook. Game designer Rick Swan described the book as "a straightforward presentation of an easily managed and highly playable system that clears up the ambiguities in the 1st Edition game and adds a number of elegant new touches".

Here, the skills of the psionicist are based on Wisdom and Constitution. Characters of chaotic alignment were not allowed to become psionicists, with the rationale being that volatile chaotics lack the discipline required to focus their mental energies. The book assigned psionic powers to the six disciplines listed above. As a psionicist gains experience and advances in level, they acquire more powers. Each power has a score rated in terms of a particular attribute. When attempting to use a power, the player makes a Power Check using 1d20. A psionicist has a fixed number of Psionic Strength Points, derived from their Wisdom, to expend on psionic powers. Psychic combat has its own chapter. The book includes updates on psionic monsters (including the thought eater and cerebral parasite), a discussion of society's reaction to psionicists, and a section describing the role of psionics in Ravenloft and other TSR campaign settings.

Dragon Magazine issue #174 included "Are You Having Bad Thoughts?", an article by Ravenloft designer Bruce Nesmith, detailing how psionics work in that setting.

The power selection for the psionicist class was later expanded by the card-based Deck of Psionic Might.

The Dark Sun campaign setting made psionics a central element for both its fictional setting and game mechanics. In the setting, all player characters and many creatures possessed at least minor psionic abilities, commonly referred to as "wild talents". Several Dark Sun supplements also introduced psionic powers and rules expansions.

==== Revision ====
The psionics system was greatly revised in Player's Option: Skills & Powers and the revised Dark Sun Campaign Setting. The psionic abilities possessed by a character are determined by the Wisdom, Constitution, and Intelligence scores of that character. Any character with high enough scores and successful dice rolling can have a psionic talent called a "wild talent". Any player character in the Dark Sun world will have psionic talent. Characters with psionic abilities also have Psionic Strength Points (PSPs) and a Mental Armor Class (MAC). Many of the powers were also altered in this revision.

A reviewer for the British magazine Arcane felt that this system was "a much more logical set-up than was previously in use. It's a matter of taste, though, as to whether you think there's any need for spell-like psionic powers when the game already supports such a wide variety of magical styles."

=== 3rd and 3.5 editions ===
Psionics were overhauled in the release of the Psionics Handbook (2001) for Dungeons & Dragons Third Edition. The psionicist was renamed "psion" and more closely resembled the Sorcerer class in terms of combat ability. A new character class, the psychic warrior, was introduced. Psions were given several new abilities and psionic powers that were intended to complement the new and revised abilities of the magic-using character classes, and psionic items were introduced to give psionic characters an alternative to using magical items.

The psionics system was again revised for the 3.5 edition of the game, in the Expanded Psionics Handbook (2004). This change streamlined the system and eliminated the psionic combat system that had previously been employed, while adding some new mechanics. Any character with some form of psionic ability could now spend a turn concentrating to gain "psionic focus", with various abilities either functioning only while focused or fuelled by expending focus. The book also introduced other races, such as the "Elan", psionic characters who had achieved immortality. The May 2004 issue of Dragon introduced the "Athasian elan" as a playable character race for the Dark Sun campaign setting.

In the Eberron Campaign Setting (2004), many psionic characters have some connection to the quori - malevolent spirits from the dreamrealm of Dal Quor - with such talents being particularly common on the quori-ruled continent of Sarlona. The book also introduces "Kalashtar" as a playable race, psionically gifted humans whose ancestors offered sanctuary to rogue quori within their own souls. Psionics- and quori-related mechanics were expanded upon in later Eberron supplements.

The Complete Psionic (2006) book introduced three new standard classes as well as several prestige classes for the psionic character. It also includes a variant Psion class called the "Erudite" which does not have to specialize in a specific discipline. It also has the ability to learn an unlimited number of powers but can manifest a limited few each day. Complete Psionic also introduced a number of minor rules changes and clarifications.

=== 4th Edition ===
The Player's Handbook 3, published March 16, 2010, includes four psionic classes, the ardent, battlemind, monk and psion. Psionic powers are called disciplines. Monks use the same general system of at-will, encounter and daily attack and utility powers, while the other three classes lack encounter attack powers, instead possessing a pool of power points which they can use to augment their at-will attack powers.

=== 5th Edition ===
On July 6, 2015, Wizards of the Coast published an Unearthed Arcana article on their website introducing a playtest version of new psionics rules for 5th Edition D&D. The article also describes a new psionic class, the Mystic, which could resemble one of several different psionic classes from past editions, depending on the player's choice of Psionic Order. An online survey was conducted to gather feedback from the community, and on September 11, Wizards reported that the core rules were "a good start," but the Mystic class could use greater flexibility. An Unearthed Arcana article published on April 14, 2020, explained that despite positive response from some fans, the Mystic class was removed in favor of options for existing classes to use psionic powers.

The three psionic subclasses were outlined in the 2019 article in Unearthed Arcana introduced psionic sub-classes for the Fighter, Rogue, and Wizard. Two Third Edition classes, the Psychic Warrior for Fighters, the Soulknife for Rogues were brought back as subclasses, and a new psionic Arcane Tradition was created for Wizards. This playtest also included several new psionic-flavored spells and feats. Designers continued to revise the psionic rules releasing another playtest in an Unearthed Arcana article published in March 2020. The revisions kept the Soulknife as a Rogue subclass, changed the name of the Psychic Warrior to the Psi Knight, and dropped the Psionics Wizard subclass in favor of a new, Sorcerer subclass called the Psychic Soul. It also included new spells, feats, and features for each. A new Psionic Talent Die was included which would gradually grow in size as a player levels up, and offer either increases in damage, or other mechanical augmentations to a psion's powers. At their online gaming event D&D Celebration Wizards' of the Coast revealed that the upcoming supplement Tasha's Cauldron of Everything would include a new take on Psionics.

== Psionic classes ==
In 1st edition, there was no specific character class for psionics. In 2nd edition, only one psionic character class was introduced, the Psionicist. In 3rd edition this class was renamed "Psion", and various new alternate classes were introduced based on psionics usage. Psionics Handbook was later updated for version 3.5 with the Expanded Psionics Handbook, and new material was added in the Complete Psionic book.

In the fourth edition, psionic power is considered to be a power source on a par with martial, divine, arcane, or primal power. The Psion was reintroduced as a psionic controller, along with the Ardent, Battlemind, and Monk.

=== Monk ===
In 4th edition, the Monk uses the psionic power source.

=== Psion/Psionicist ===
Psion
- Dungeons & Dragons character class

Editions
- Alternate class: 2nd; 3rd; v3.5; 4th

Publication history
- Previous name: Psionicist (2nd ed.)
- Introduction: The Complete Psionics Handbook
- Source books: The Complete Psionics Handbook; Dark Sun Campaign Setting; Dark Sun Campaign Setting, Expanded and Revised; Psionics Handbook; Expanded Psionics Handbook; Player's Handbook 3

Inspiration
- Based on: Psychic

Grouping
- 2E group: none
- 4E powersource: Psionic
- 4E role: Controller

Psionicists and Psions are dedicated to the usage of psionic power.

The powers of a Psionicist come from the mind, rather than external agencies as with a Wizard, and as Psionicists rise in level they will have access to additional attack and defense strategies as well as more psionic powers.

==== 2nd edition ====
The Psionicist class was introduced in 2nd edition, in which it is the sole official psionic class, in The Complete Psionics Handbook. Psionicists use psionics according to 2nd edition's standard psionics system, in which they expend Psionic Strength Points to activate and sustain powers, and activating most powers requires a roll based on an ability score.

==== 3rd and 3.5 editions ====
In 3rd and 3.5 editions, Psions are mechanically similar to Sorcerers, but with an arsenal of powers smaller than the Sorcerer's number of spells. Like Wizards, Psions can (and must) specialize in one discipline, with some powers within each discipline being available only to specialists. In 3rd edition the various disciplines were each linked to a statistic; for instance, clairsentience is linked to Wisdom, and Psions who specialize in it are known as Seers. This was changed in 3.5 so that all disciplines are linked to the Intelligence statistic. Psion is the favored class of the elan race (found in the Expanded Psionics Handbook), as well as the kalashtar (found in the Eberron Campaign Setting).

In both 3rd and 3.5 editions, Psions expend power points to activate their psionic powers. In 3.5 edition, psionic powers can be augmented by spending additional power points to create a new or enhanced effect. Damage-dealing powers in 3.5 do not scale with the user's level as spells do, and must be augmented to the maximum in order to match the power of an equivalent-level spellcaster; however, many powers compensate for this loss of efficiency with added versatility, such as energy ray allowing the user to switch between four elements with different effects.

Psions also have access to metapsionic feats, which grant generic augments that can be applied to any power. These augments are cheaper in cost than equivalent metamagic feats, but always require the psion to expend their psionic focus - thus granting psions greater power in short bursts, but making it harder for them to use metapsionic feats repeatedly or apply multiple such feats to a single power.

==== 4th edition ====
In 4th Edition Dungeons & Dragons, Psions are a Psionic Controller class. Unlike most 4th edition classes, Psions do not have any encounter attack powers, instead, they have a pool of power points, which can be used to augment at-will attack powers. Like encounter powers, power points are recharged by a short rest. A preview was presented in Dragon Magazine #375 in May 2009, and the class is among the classes included in the Player's Handbook 3, which was released on March 16, 2010.

==== Psionicists and Psions in other media ====
Psionicists are among the classes in Dark Sun: Shattered Lands and Dark Sun Online: Crimson Sands PC games. Psions are among the classes in the 2007 PSP game Dungeons & Dragons Tactics.

=== Psychic Warrior ===
Psi Warrior
- Dungeons & Dragons character class

Editions
- Alternate class: 3rd; v3.5
- Subclass: 5th; 5.5e

Publication history
- Previous name: Psychic Warrior (3rd edition)
- Introduction: Psionics Handbook
- Source books: Psionics Handbook; Expanded Psionics Handbook; Tasha's Cauldron of Everything; Player's Handbook (2024)

Grouping
- 5E base class: Fighter

Introduced in 3rd edition, psychic warriors are a blend between Fighters and Psions. Like fighters, they gain bonus feats, and like Psions, they wield psionic powers, though at a slower rate than either specialized class. Their attack bonus and hit point growth is similarly in the middle. Psychic warrior is the favored class of half-giants (found in the Expanded Psionics Handbook).

In 3rd edition, Psychic Warrior powers are tied to multiple statistics depending on their discipline, as Psions. In 3.5, the Psychic Warrior's powers are always tied to the Wisdom statistic.

=== Soulknife ===
Soulknife
- Dungeons & Dragons character class

Editions
- Alternate class: 3rd; v3.5
- Subclass: 5th; 5.5e

Publication history
- Introduction: Psionics Handbook
- Source books: Psionics Handbook; Expanded Psionics Handbook; Tasha's Cauldron of Everything; Player's Handbook (2024)

Grouping
- 5E base class: Rogue

Soulknives are warriors who have learned to channel psionic power into "mind blades", or swords composed of psionic energy. Their broad training allows them to take many occupations and be a "jack of all trades." Soulknives are the only psionic characters who cannot manifest powers from their class; the soulknife class grants power points, but not the ability to use them. As a soulknife gains levels, the powers of her mind blade increase, such as the ability to form her mind blade into shapes other than a short sword (a concept further expanded with new feats in Complete Psionic). Soulknife is the favored class of the xeph race (found in the Expanded Psionics Handbook). Soulknife was a prestige class in the original Psionics Handbook, but it was made into a base class when psionics were revised for v3.5.

=== Wilder ===
Wilder
- Dungeons & Dragons character class

Editions
- Alternate class: v3.5

Publication history
- Introduction: Expanded Psionics Handbook
- Source books: Expanded Psionics Handbook

Introduced in 3.5 edition, wilders can use "wild surges", which allow them to augment their psionic powers to a greater extent than normal. Doing so is dangerous: every time a wild surge is used there is a chance that the wilder will suffer from "psychic enervation" causing them to become dazed and lose power points. A wilder's powers are tied to the Charisma statistic. They are slightly tougher than Psions, but know fewer powers and do not have a specialized discipline. Wilder is the favored class of the dromite and maenad races (both found in the Expanded Psionics Handbook).

=== Other psionic classes ===
The following classes were introduced in 3.5 editions' Complete Psionic.

Class	Description
Ardent	Ardents derive their powers from a focus on primal truths or concepts ("mantles"); different mantles offer different abilities to an Ardent. They possess a smaller selection of powers than the more versatile Psion, but enjoy greater martial abilities.
Divine Mind	The Divine Mind is a character who chooses to serve a deity using psionic powers; they are thus somewhat similar to Clerics. Like clerics, they may choose mantles a deity represents, similar to domains. They may also exude Attack, Defense, or Perception auras that grant bonuses to nearby allies.
Erudite	Rather than learn powers upon level gain like Psions, erudites may theoretically use any psionic ability by "copying" another person or a psionically infused item. In exchange, they may call upon only a limited selection of powers per day. Mechanically, they are thus somewhat similar to unspecialized Wizards rather than Psions.
Lurk	Lurks are similar to rogues who call upon psionic powers to aid them. They may perceive the weaknesses of enemies and make sneak attacks, as well as use psionic augments to their abilities.

== Psionic items ==
In 2nd edition, all psionic items are intelligent items with PSP pools and the ability to use psionic powers.

In 3rd edition, psionic items are much closer to magic items. They are generally not intelligent items, and are divided into nine categories: armor, shields, melee weapons, ranged weapons, psionic tattoos, cognizance crystals, power stones, dorjes and universal items. Armor, shields and weapons have enhancement bonuses and abilities like their magical counterparts, cognizance crystals store power points with no other power, dorjes are the psionic equivalent of wands, power stones are the psionic equivalent of scrolls, psionic tattoos are the psionic counterpart of potions, and universal items are the psionic counterpart of wondrous items.
