= Psionics Handbook =

Tabletop role-playing game supplement

- Author: Bruce R. Cordell
- Genre: Role-playing game
- Publisher: Wizards of the Coast
- Publication date: March 2001
- Media type: Print (Hardback)
- Pages: 160
- ISBN: 978-0-7869-1835-5
- OCLC: 49583257
- LC Class: GV1469.62.D84 D836 2000

The Psionics Handbook is a sourcebook published by Wizards of the Coast in 2001 for the 3rd edition of the Dungeons & Dragons fantasy role-playing game. It contains a multitude of rules and options for integrating psionic powers into the D&D game.

== Contents ==
This book adapts the psionics concept for 3rd edition of D&D. The first chapter describes the two main branches of psionic characters, Psions and Psychic Warriors. The second and third chapters describe new skills and gifts available to these characters. The fourth and fifth chapters explore powers and defenses available. The sixth chapter describes various character classes available. The final chapter describes psi-powered items.

== Publication history ==
The previous iteration of the sourcebook, Complete Psionics Handbook (1991), was released for AD&D. Following the release of the 3rd edition of D&D by Wizards of the Coast, Psionics Handbook was one of the first supplements for the new edition and was published in March 2001. The sourcebook was designed by Bruce R. Cordell, with cover art by Arnie Swekel, interior illustrations by Lars Grant-West, Heather Hudson, David Martin, Wayne Reynolds, Arniel Swekel, and Sam Wood.

A revised edition, Expanded Psionics Handbook (2004), was later released for 3.5 D&D.

== Reception ==
Pyramid commented that "The Psionics Handbook is almost GURPS like in its approach to Psionics, in that its total coverage that can be added whole, piecemeal, or ignored" and noted that the method by which the psion specializes in one of the fields of psionic abilities "works so well that it's amazing that Wizards didn't do this for the wizard classes".

Psionics Handbook was #3 on CBR's 2021 "D&D: 10 Best Supplemental Handbooks" list — the article states that "sometimes, generic magic isn't enough to state how insane a character should be. Instead, the idea is to be higher-minded and only utilize the power of their minds. Consequently, the Psionics Handbook is the perfect tool for those who are looking for something a little different".

In comparing the sourcebook to the revised edition, Kevin Kulp, for the Dungeon Masters Guild, wrote that "the change in psionics rules was almost universally welcomed by psionics fans, who felt that the previous rules had not allowed them enough flexibility or power. The previous Psionics Handbook suffered somewhat from having powers linked to key ability scores for each psionic discipline. Players found that this fostered 'MAD' ('Multiple Ability Dependency'), requiring psionic characters to have many high ability scores in order to be effective. In striving toward balance, the original 3e Psionics Handbook may have erred on the side of creating weak player characters".

== Reviews ==
- Backstab #30
- Coleção Dragão Brasil
- Campaign Magazine #1 (Aug./Sept., 2001)

== Other recognition ==
A copy of Psionics Handbook is held in the collection of the Strong National Museum of Play (object 110.2543).
