= Arnie Swekel =

American artist

Arnie Swekel is an artist whose work has appeared in role-playing games.

== Background ==
Swekel was born May 2, 1964, and grew up in River Rouge, Michigan. After graduating high school he briefly attended The Center for Creative Studies (now called College for Creative Studies) in Detroit but left after only one semester. Swekel's interest in art continued unabated, however and, while largely self-taught, began his career as a professional artist at age 27. Swekel currently works as a principal artist at the computer game company Raven Software and lives in the Madison Wisconsin area with his wife and three children.

== Works ==
Arnie Swekel has continued to produce interior illustrations for many Dungeons & Dragons books and Dragon magazine since 1992, as well as cover art for Return to White Plume Mountain (1999), Psionics Handbook (2001), Manual of the Planes (2001), and Epic Level Handbook (2002). He has also produced artwork for many other games including Pendragon (Chaosium), Obsidian (Apophis Consortium), and Kingdoms of Kalamar (Kenzer and Company).

Swekel also illustrated cards for the Magic: The Gathering collectible card game.
