= The Complete Psionics Handbook =

Dungeons & Dragons supplement

- Author: Steve Winter
- Series: Player's Handbook Rules Supplements
- Subject: Dungeons & Dragons
- Genre: Role-playing games
- Publisher: TSR, Inc.
- Publication date: 1991
- ISBN: 1-56076-054-0
- OCLC: 23936475
- Preceded by: The Complete Wizard's Handbook
- Followed by: The Complete Book of Dwarves

The Complete Psionics Handbook is a supplemental rulebook for the 2nd edition of the Dungeons & Dragons fantasy role-playing game, published in 1991 by TSR, Inc.

== Contents ==
With The Complete Psionics Handbook, psionics in the AD&D game became the domain of an entirely new class, the psionicist. The psionicist's skills are based on the Wisdom and Constitution ability scores, and while humans can attain higher levels of expertise, all races are eligible for the class. Characters of chaotic alignment are not allowed to become psionicists, with the rationale being that volatile chaotic characters lack the discipline required to focus their mental energies. Psionic powers are assigned to six disciplines, which include clairsentience (divination), psychokinesis (animating and controlling existing objects and forces), psychometabolism (body-changing powers), psychoportation (teleportation variants), telepathy (mental communication and psychic attacks), and metapsionics (enhancement of other psychic abilities). Powers are designated as either sciences (major powers) or devotions (minor powers). As a psionicist gains experience and advances in level, he acquires more powers, and as a psionicist rises through the ranks, he also gains access to defense modes - special telepathic powers, which are received free of charge and don't count against a psionicist's normal power limits.

The use of psionic powers involves a variant of the proficiencies system developed in the 2nd Edition rules. Each power has a score rated in terms of a particular attribute. When attempting to use a power, the player makes a Power Check by rolling 1d20 and comparing the result to the Power Score. A roll less than or equal to the Power Score means success. Additionally, each power description includes a specific penalty suffered by the psionicist if a 20 is rolled. A psionicist has a fixed number of Psionic Strength Points, derived from his wisdom score, to expend on psionic powers. A psionicist expends the number of PSPs required by a particular power, then attempts a Power Check. If the check fails and the power doesn't work, he forfeits half the PSP cost but is free to try again later. If he passes the check and the power is successful, the psionicist has the option of expending additional PSPs to maintain the power in subsequent rounds. Psionicists recover lost PSPs every hour in which no additional PSPs are expended. The less physical exertion, the more PSPs recovered; a walking PC recovers 3 PSPs per hour, and a resting PC recovers twice as many.

The book contains over 150 psionic powers, and includes an entire chapter on psychic combat. The book also includes psionic monsters, such as the thought eater and cerebral parasite. The book has a discussion of society's reaction to psionicists, and a section describing the role of psionics in various TSR campaign settings.

== Publication history ==
The Complete Psionics Handbook was published as a 128-page softcover book by TSR, Inc., with design by Steve Winter, and monster updates by Blake Mobley. Editing was by Andria Hayday, with illustrations by Terry Dykstra and Dee Barnett, and graphic design by Stephanie Tabat.

Tsr code 2117, ad&d 2nd edition code PHBR5.

== Reception ==
Rick Swan reviewed The Complete Psionics Handbook for Dragon magazine #180 (April 1992). Swan gave the book a positive review, stating that while the large increase in the complexity of psionics from the 1st edition was intimidating, the system itself was straightforward and highly playable. Swan felt that the new book offered a number of elegant improvements over the previous system. He noted that the system's use of "power points" was similar to the magic systems used in a number of other role-playing games, and that for the most part it offered a distinct alternative to D&D's magic options. Swan felt that although the book was comprehensive for players, it lacked adequate advice for game masters to integrate the system into a game, and that some of the details of the system were a hassle for game masters to keep track of.

Michael Lampman reviewed The Complete Psionics Handbook in Shadis #8 and said that "Overall, the Handbook is good. While it could have been stronger in some spots, and the combat system could have used some more work, the Psionics Handbook is overall a fine addition to the gaming shelf of any AD&Der wanting to use psychic abilities in his/her campaign, and as a source material for gamers of other systems interested in adding a wide variety of different psychic powers to their campaigns."

== Reviews ==
- Casus Belli #63
