= Matthew Mitchell (artist) =

American artist

- Known for: Fantasy art

Matthew Mitchell is an American artist whose work has appeared in role-playing games.

== Early life and education ==
Originally from Minnesota, Matthew Mitchell spent a year studying biology/premedical illustration at Iowa State University in Ames. Mitchell then attended the Pratt Institute in Brooklyn and graduated with a Bachelor of Fine Arts. Mitchell collaborated with artist Perre DiCarlo and local community gardeners to build a stone amphitheater in Manhattan's Lower East Side, and then worked as a cabinetmaker and a welder.

== Career ==
Mitchell is known for his work on the Magic: The Gathering card game. His Dungeons & Dragons work includes Book of Exalted Deeds, Epic Level Handbook, and Draconomicon.

He has worked on a series of paintings of American soldiers from Afghanistan and Iraq called "100 Faces of War Experience".

Mitchell is married to Rebecca Guay. They live in Amherst, Massachusetts.
