= Glen Angus =

Canadian artist (1970–2007)

Glen Michael Angus
- Born: August 18, 1970; Windsor, Ontario, Canada
- Died: July 19, 2007 (aged 36); Verona, Wisconsin, U.S.
- Known for: Fantasy art

Glen Michael Angus (August 18, 1970 – July 19, 2007) was a Canadian artist whose work has appeared in role-playing games and video games.

== Early life ==
Angus was born August 18, 1970, in Windsor, Ontario. He played the Dungeons & Dragons role-playing game as a child, which his father Jim Angus said cultivated his son's passion for the fantasy genre.

== Career ==
Angus began producing interior illustrations for Dungeons & Dragons books in 1994. He also illustrated cards for the Magic: The Gathering collectible card game. Amongst his other tabletop role-playing game illustrations are Iron Crown Enterprises games Middle-earth Role Playing and Rolemaster.

He also worked for Ravensoft on the X-Men Legends video game, in which his art appeared. He worked for four years as an artist at Raven Software/Activision, and at the time of his death he was a principal artist for Ravensoft/Activision.

== Personal life ==
Angus taught graphic and computer art at St. Clair College, which he previously attended. He taught there for five years as a teacher of illustration and graphic design. Angus and his family moved to Wisconsin, USA, in 2002.

Angus died suddenly on July 19, 2007, from a sudden heart failure at age 36 in Verona, Wisconsin, where he lived with his wife and two children.
