= Tony Szczudlo =

American artist

- Known for: Fantasy art

Tony Szczudlo is an artist whose work has appeared in role-playing games. He is known for his work in Dungeons & Dragons, Harry Potter, and Lord of the Rings.

== Career ==
Tony Szczudlo was the lead artist for the Birthright campaign from the late 1990s. His Dungeons & Dragons work includes cover art and interior illustrations for many Birthright books, as well as cover art for late second edition Greyhawk books Greyhawk: The Adventure Begins, Crypt of Lyzandred the Mad, The Doomgrinder, and Return of the Eight.

Szczudlo is also known for his work on the Magic: The Gathering collectible card game.
