= The Fright at Tristor =

Dungeons & Dragons adventure module

- Code: B0001723
- Rules required: 3rd Edition D&D
- Character levels: 1 - 3
- Campaign setting: Greyhawk / Generic D&D
- Authors: Keith Polster
- First published: 2001

The Fright at Tristor is an adventure module for the Dungeons & Dragons fantasy role-playing game. The 32-page adventure was published by Wizards of the Coast in 2001 and distributed primarily through the company's Role-Playing Games Association. It was designed for use as either an introductory module for the Living Greyhawk campaign or as a generic D&D adventure for low-level characters.

== Synopsis ==
The plot of The Fright at Tristor begins with a mention of the brutal murders occurring in the hamlet of Tristor, in the northern reaches of the Theocracy of the Pale. The townsfolk fear that they may be the next target of these attacks. The party has been hired to investigate, a reward being offered if they can stop these murders occurring. Some believe the source of the attacks to be a band of orcs following a mysterious entity known as "The Watcher." When outlying farms are attacked outright, it is up to the adventurers to halt these killings and save the town.

== Publication history ==
The Fright at Tristor was designed by Keith Polster, and was published in 2000. Cover art was by Rebecca Guay, with interior art by Matthew Mitchell.
