= Vale of the Mage =

Dungeons & Dragons adventure module

- Cover art by Roger Loveless, 1989
- Code: WG12
- Authors: Jean Rabe
- First published: 1989

Vale of the Mage is an adventure module published by TSR in 1989 for the fantasy role-playing game Advanced Dungeons & Dragons.

== Plot summary ==
Vale of the Mage is an adventure scenario in which the player characters pursue renegade wizards that have fled across the Barrier Peaks to the Vale of the Mage, where the characters must seek assistance from the Vale's master against the wizards.

== Publication history ==
WG12 Vale of the Mage was the twelfth and last module in the World of Greyhawk line of adventures, published by TSR in 1989 as a 64-page booklet with an outer folder. It was written by Jean Rabe, with interior art by Frey Graphics, David C. Sutherland III, and Valerie Valusek, and cover art by Roger Loveless.

== Reception ==
In the June 1990 edition of Games International (Issue 15), the reviewer compared this adventure to its predecessor, WG 11 Puppets, and said Vale of the Mage was "beefier, featuring [...] a lot of dodgy goings on involving Dark Elves."

== Reviews ==
- GamesMaster International Issue 1 - Aug 1990
