= Filge =

Filge can refer to:

- FILe Generator and Editor (FILGE), a command-oriented text editor created by CompuServe in the early 1970s.
- Filge, a fictional character in the World of Greyhawk campaign setting for the Dungeons & Dragons role-playing game
