= Winter Fantasy =

United States gaming convention

Winter Fantasy is an annual gaming convention that takes place in the United States every January or February.

== History ==
The convention was held as early as 1977 under the name Winter Fantasy. In 2007 the convention was renamed to D&D Experience (often abbreviated as DDXP or D&DXP). In 2012 Wizards of the Coast announced it would now use the title D&D Experience for the events it held at the Gen Con convention. Baldman Games, the company currently operating this and other conventions for Wizards of the Coast, decided to continue the tradition and brought back the name Winter Fantasy for the 2013 convention.

The convention was closely tied to and was sponsored by the RPGA, from 1989 until TSR went bankrupt.

Winter Fantasy has played host to a wide variety of tournament and organized play games. These include popular living campaign programs such as Living City, Living Greyhawk, and Living Forgotten Realms. The 2013 convention included Pathfinder Society games run by Paizo Publishing in addition to Wizards of the Coast organized play events.

Winter Fantasy has often featured special events either not available elsewhere or with a limited release. 2013 included a special Pathfinder scenario and multi-table battle interactive events for the Living Forgotten Realms and Ashes of Athas campaigns. Ashes of Athas is a Dark Sun campaign, which started at Winter Fantasy 2011 and concluded at Winter Fantasy 2013.

The location of the convention has moved over the years. It is currently held in Fort Wayne, Indiana, a site it has held since 2009 and also several times in the past. The first Winter Fantasy was organized by Rob Kuntz and held January 8 to 9, 1977, at American Legion Hall in Lake Geneva, WI. Other locations have included Milwaukee (1992), Chicago, New Jersey (2004), and Washington, DC (2005–2008).

== Timeline ==
Event	Date	Location	Notes
"Winter Fantasy 1"	January 8–9, 1977	American Legion Hall; Lake Geneva, Wisconsin	Organized and chaired by Rob Kuntz
"Winter Fantasy 3"	January 6–7, 1979	Lake Geneva, WI	First Official Invitations AD&D Masters Tournament held. J. Eric Holmes was one of 45 invited to the event. 18 actual tournament participants.
"Winter Fantasy 4"	January 5–6, 1980	Lake Geneva, WI	Held at American Legion Hall.
"Winter Fantasy 6"	1982	?	TSR either sponsoring or co-sponsoring Winter Fantasy at this time.
"Winter Fantasy 8"	March 3–4, 1984	Americana Resort, Lake Geneva, WI	The tournament adventure by Frank Mentzer, The 384th Incarnation of Bigby's Tomb, for levels 15–25, ran twice.
"Winter Fantasy 16"	January 3–5, 1992	Milwaukee, WI	Events included Living City, Paranoia, Marvel Super Heroes, Torg, and Star Wars. Registration through the RPGA. First two-round Living City tournament, "Eye of the Leviathan". RPGA's first interactive event, "Terrors of Terre Haute".
"Winter Fantasy 17"	January 8–10, 1993	Milwaukee, WI	First year in MECCA site. Preregistration is $16, $10 for RPGA members. Events included electing a player as Lord Mayor in the Living City campaign, Living City, D&D, Gamma World, Star Wars, Shadowrun, Call of Cthulhu, and Dawn Patrol.
"Winter Fantasy 18"	January 7–9, 1994	Milwaukee, WI	Guests of honor Bruce Nesmith, Bill Slavicsek, James Lowder.
"Winter Fantasy 19"	February 10–12, 1995	Milwaukee, WI	Guests of honor Wolfgang Baur (TSR), Chuck Crain (Ral Partha). Events included Living City tournaments, Ravens Bluff interactive, Axis & Allies tourney, writer's workshops, seminars, premiere of Living Jungle.
"Winter Fantasy 20"	February 9–11, 1996	Milwaukee, WI	
"Winter Fantasy 21"	1997 (Did not take place)	(none)	Convention was canceled the year TSR went out of business.
"Winter Fantasy 22"	February 26-March 1, 1998	Chicago, IL	Introduced Marvel Super Heroes Adventure Game
"Winter Fantasy 23"	February 25–28, 1999	Chicago, IL	
"Winter Fantasy 24"	January 13–16, 2000	Fort Wayne, IN	TSR staff and some of future Triads and Circle members on hand to speak about upcoming Living Greyhawk campaign (launched at Gen Con 2000).
"Winter Fantasy 25"	January 25–28, 2001	Fort Wayne, IN	Preregistration exceeds 2000 attendance. Living Force campaign launched. Celebrated 20th year of RPGA on Saturday. First 3rd edition Living City scenarios. Guests of honor Monte Cook and Andy Collins run Moathouse portion of Return to the Temple of Elemental Evil for Living Greyhawk.
"Winter Fantasy 27"	2003	Fort Wayne, IN	Included Assault on the Vault special for Living Greyhawk.
"Winter Fantasy 28"	2004	East Rutherford, New Jersey	Only year in New Jersey.
"Winter Fantasy 29"	2005	Crystal City, VA (Washington, DC)	First year in DC area.
"Winter Fantasy 30"	2006	Crystal City, VA (Washington, DC)	Last year of the Living Force organized play campaign.
"Winter Fantasy 31"	2007	Crystal City, VA (Washington, DC)	Last year of the Living Death organized play campaign.
"Winter Fantasy 32"	2008	Crystal City, VA (Washington, DC)	Last year in DC area and last year for Living Greyhawk events. Two adventures previewed upcoming 4th Edition.
"Winter Fantasy 33"	Jan 29 - Feb 1, 2009	Fort Wayne, IN	Returned to Fort Wayne, first year of Living Forgotten Realms 4E campaign.
"Winter Fantasy 33"	Jan 28–31, 2010	Fort Wayne, IN	Featured 4E "Death in the Arena" Dark Sun setting preview.
"Winter Fantasy 35"	2011	Fort Wayne, IN	Premiere of Ashes of Athas campaign.
"Winter Fantasy 36"	January 26–29, 2012	Fort Wayne, IN	First ever public playtest of D&D Next. Last year event used DDXP name.
"Winter Fantasy 37"	Jan 23–27, 2013	Fort Wayne, IN	Return of name Winter Fantasy. First year with Paizo events. Conclusion of Ashes of Athas campaign.
"Winter Fantasy 38"	Feb 5–9, 2014	Fort Wayne, IN	Final adventures for the Living Forgotten Realms campaign and conclusion of Epic series. Paradigm joins the show with Witch Hunter and Living Arcanis adventures. Classic Living Greyhawk special adventures Isle of Woe and Castle Greyhawk run, converted to D&D Next. Paizo does not return to the show.
"Winter Fantasy 39"	Feb 4–8, 2015	Fort Wayne, IN	First year providing adventures for the D&D Adventurers League program as part of the Tyranny of Dragons storyline. Previewed the Shadow of the Demon Lord and Red Aegis RPGs. Living Arcanis, Witch Hunter, and NeoExodus Legacies were also present at the show.
"Winter Fantasy 40"	Feb 3–7, 2016	Fort Wayne, IN	Adventurers League concludes the Rage of Demons storyline and offers an All-Access premium pass of adventures written and run by WotC or campaign admins. Paizo returns after a 2-year absence. Paradigm returns with Living Arcanis. Schwalb Entertainment offers linked adventures for Shadow of the Demon Lord.
"Winter Fantasy 41"	Feb 1–5, 2017	Fort Wayne, IN	Adventurers League concludes the Storm King's Thunder storyline, offers Baldman Games convention content adventures, and featured several Author-Only adventures written by administrators. Epics included The Iron Baron and The Ark of the Mountains. Paradigm returns with Living Arcanis. Schwalb Entertainment offers linked adventures for Shadow of the Demon Lord.
"Winter Fantasy 42"	Feb 7–11, 2018	Fort Wayne, IN	Adventurers League continued the Tomb of Annihilation storyline, offered Author-Only adventures, and featured Baldman Games convention content adventures. Paradigm offered Living Arcanis, Schwalb Entertainment returned with Shadow of the Demon Lord, and Pelgrane Press adventures for Nights Black Agents and Timewatch were run in several slots. Living Divine returned after being away several years. The convention also featured a workshop on writing adventures.
"Winter Fantasy 43"	February 6–10, 2019	Fort Wayne, IN	Grand Wayne Convention Center; Events included Living Arcanis, Shadow of the Demon Lord, The Forest Hymn & Picnic, Pathfinder 2.0 and The Delve, the D&D eXPerience, D&D Adventurers League—Shadows Rising – A Moonshae Campaign, and others.
"Winter Fantasy 44"	February 5–9, 2020	Fort Wayne, IN	Grand Wayne Convention Center; Events included Living Tal’Dorei, the D&D eXPerience, D&D Adventurers League—Descent into Avernus, Shadows Rising – A Moonshae Campaign, Eberron: The Oracle of War, and others.
"Winter Fantasy 45"	February 3–7, 2021	Fort Wayne, IN	Virtual convention online; included events for the D&D eXPerience, D&D Adventurers League—Rime of the Frostmaiden, Shadows Rising – A Moonshae Campaign, and Eberron: The Oracle of War, and others.
"Winter Fantasy 46"	February 2–6, 2022	Fort Wayne, IN	Grand Wayne Convention Center; Adventurers League events for The Wild Beyond the Witchlight, Shadows Rising – A Moonshae Campaign, Dreams of the Red Wizards, Ravenloft: Mist Hunters, and Eberron: The Oracle of War, and others.
"Winter Fantasy 47"	February 1–5, 2023	Fort Wayne, IN	Grand Wayne Convention Center
"Winter Fantasy 48"	February 7–11, 2024	Fort Wayne, IN	Grand Wayne Convention Center
"Winter Fantasy 49"	February 5–10, 2025	Fort Wayne, IN	Grand Wayne Convention Center

=== Scheduled future events ===
"Winter Fantasy 50"	February 4–8, 2026	Fort Wayne, IN	Planned
"Winter Fantasy 51"	February 3–7, 2027	Fort Wayne, IN	Planned
