= Treasures of Greyhawk =

Dungeons & Dragons adventure module

- Code: WGR2
- TSR product code: 9360
- Rules required: 2nd Ed AD&D
- Character levels: 4 - 18
- Campaign setting: Greyhawk
- Authors: Various
- First published: 1992

Treasures of Greyhawk is an adventure module for the Dungeons & Dragons fantasy roleplaying game, set in the game's World of Greyhawk campaign setting.

== Plot summary ==
As the name of the module implies, each of these mini-adventures is designed to focus on a unique treasure in the World of Greyhawk. Such treasures include the Helm of Selnor, the Eye of Nyr Dyv, the Face of Xenous, and the Sword of Azor'alq..

=== List of adventures ===
Title	Location	Levels
"A Little Knowledge"	Perrenland	3 - 5
"Bladestar"	Free City of Greyhawk	3 - 5
"The Neogi Nest"	Free City of Greyhawk	6 - 8
"The Shroud of Karyne"	Cairn Hills	5 - 7
"Helm of Selnor"	County of Ulek	5 - 7
"Bigby's Modest Home"	Free City of Greyhawk / Veluna	6 - 8
"Terror in the Tropics"	Amedio Jungle	8 - 10
"On the Town"	Jetsom Isle	8 - 10
"Crossing Into Steel"	Shield Lands	7 - 9
"Face of Xenous"	Free City of Greyhawk	8 - 10
"Well of All Heals"	Sunndi	Any
"The Wizard Isn't Home"	South Shore of the Nyr Dyv	5 - 7
"All For a Hat"	County of Urnst	10 - 12
"A Sword for a Hero"	Crystalmist Mountains	17 - 19

== Publication history ==
The module was published by TSR, Inc. in 1992 for the second edition Advanced Dungeons & Dragons. It bears the code "WGR2" and contains 19 short adventures set in various locations throughout the World of Greyhawk. The storylines of the adventures are loosely connected. During the various adventures in the book, players can, for example, explore the home of the archmage Bigby, invade a dragon's lair, travel to the demiplane called The Great Maze of Zagyg, and trade riddles with a sphinx.

== Reception ==
Keith H. Eisenbeis reviewed the module in the March/April issue of White Wolf magazine. He stated that anyone could find use in it and that "This product is certainly worth buying for those who run Greyhawk campaigns and can be fairly easily adapted to other similar campaign worlds such as the Forgotten Realms." He rated it as a 3 out of a possible 5.
