= Sean K. Reynolds =

American professional game designer

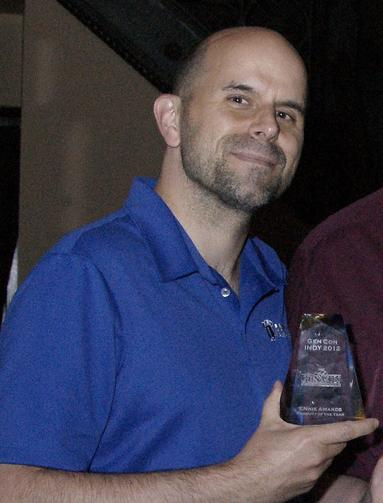
- Reynolds in 2012
- Born: Chula Vista, California
- Occupations: Writer, game designer
- Writing career
- Genre: Role-playing games

Sean K. Reynolds is an American professional game designer, who has worked on and co-written a number of Dungeons & Dragons supplements for Wizards of the Coast, as well as material for other companies.

== Early life and inspiration ==
Sean Reynolds was born in Chula Vista, California, and grew up there. He was introduced to the Dungeons & Dragons game (with the red Basic Set and the blue Expert Set) in 1980 by his cousin, and soon began playing the AD&D game.

== TSR and Wizards of the Coast ==
Reynolds began working for Time Warner Interactive in 1994, to develop their America Online and websites. Reynolds first entered the role-playing game industry in 1995, when he was hired by TSR as their online coordinator, beating out Bruce Cordell for the same position. According to Reynolds, "I had two goals: to get TSR a website, and to change the company's then-restrictive online policy to something more reasonable." When TSR was bought out by Wizards of the Coast, Reynolds moved to Washington and worked on Wizards' pre-existing website.

Reynolds considers one of his greatest achievements of this time to be the fact that he got TSR/Wotc to relax its "draconian" online policy—enforcement of which in the past was the cause of much bad blood between the company and fans. Wizards of the Coast had a much more open online policy, so Reynolds applied for a job in the company's R&D division as a game designer. He designed such products as The Scarlet Brotherhood for AD&D, Beyond Science: A Guide to FX for the Alternity game, and The Green Goblin's Guide to Crime for the Marvel Super Heroes Adventure Game. Reynolds also did some design work such as writing RPGA adventures and contributing to Children of the Night: Ghosts.

By 1998, Reynolds had left his web position and was working full-time for WotC as a designer as part of "Team Greyhawk," the creative team tasked with revitalizing TSR/WotC's oldest campaign setting.

Reynolds also contributed to the 3rd edition D&D Monster Manual, introducing some new creatures such as the krenshar.

== After Wizards of the Coast ==
Reynolds was laid off from WotC in 2002, and afterwards formed his own self-publishing company, "Sean K Reynolds Games." He continued to freelance in the d20 industry while working as an IP developer at Upper Deck. Reynolds was let go from Upper Deck in 2008 and contacted Erik Mona at Paizo Publishing looking to do freelance work, and learned there was a job opportunity due to developer Mike McArtor leaving. In July 2008, Paizo hired Reynolds as a developer on the Pathfinder Roleplaying Game. Jason Bulmahn has described him as a "critical part of the design team". In March 2014, Sean left Paizo to move to Indiana and in May 2014 he announced that he was returning to Seattle and Wizards of the Coast for a contract position managing their third-party licensing.

== Publications ==
Books he has worked on for the d20-based 3rd edition include the Living Greyhawk Gazetteer, Forgotten Realms Campaign Setting, Savage Species, and Ghostwalk (co-written with Monte Cook).

The Forgotten Realms Campaign Setting won the Origins Award for Best Role-Playing Game Supplement of 2001. It made the Amazon.ca bestseller list at number 47 in September 2002. Reynolds identified the Forgotten Realms Campaign Setting as his favorite individual product that he had worked on as of 2009, stating that it "was a huge amount of work but was so worth it because it is a great product". In May 2003 his book Races of Faerûn (co-authored with Matt Forbeck, James Jacobs, and Eric L. Boyd) landed on the same bestseller list at number 42.
