= Border Watch =

Dungeons & Dragons adventure module

- Code: WGM1
- Rules required: 2nd Ed AD&D
- Character levels: 1 - 3
- Campaign setting: Greyhawk
- Authors: Paul T. Riegel
- First published: 1993

Border Watch is an adventure module for the Dungeons & Dragons fantasy role-playing game, set in the game's World of Greyhawk campaign setting.

== Plot summary ==
The adventure takes place on the border between the Kingdom of Furyondy and the Empire of Iuz following the Greyhawk Wars. The publication was designed for use with the updated setting information for Greyhawk found in From the Ashes.

== Publication history ==
The module bears the code WGM1 and was published by TSR, Inc. in 1993 for the second edition Advanced Dungeons & Dragons rules.

The module was written by Paul T. Riegel and edited by Andrew Steven Harris with cover art by Jennell Jaquays (Note: Credited as Paul Jaquays.) and interior art by Eric Hotz.
