= Living campaign =

Table-top role-playing game format

A living campaign, or shared campaign, is a gaming format within the table-top role-playing game community that provide the opportunity for play by an extended community within a shared universe. In contrast to traditional isolated role-playing games, living campaigns allow and encourage players to develop characters that can be played at games run by many different game masters, but which share a game world and campaign setting, as well as a plot line that is overseen by a central core of professional or volunteer editors and contributors. Many living campaigns serve a dual role of providing a creative outlet for highly involved volunteer contributors while also serving as a marketing tool for the publisher of the game system that is the focus of the living campaign. While the earliest living campaigns were run by the now defunct RPGA (Role Playing Gamer's Association), many groups around the world run active living campaigns which are independent or sponsored by other publishers.

== Overview ==
Living campaigns are a shared campaign setting with a codified set of rules for the campaign that govern how to build and advance characters as well as how the campaign will handle rules elements of the setting. Campaign staff create, distribute, and manage new adventures in that campaign setting, and quite often administer a player database and promote various products. A living campaign lets players build and advance characters, develop their personalities, and forge relationships. Living campaign games are run at conventions, game days and other gatherings. The rules for character tracking allow a player to take their PC they created for the campaign to any of these gatherings and play it in the adventures offered. It is still common for adventures to be offered at conventions with premade characters that fit to the story, but Living campaigns allow for additional options.

The original living campaign was the Living City, set in the Forgotten Realms city of Ravens Bluff, and created by the RPGA. The campaign ran in its original form in Polyhedron magazine starting in the mid-1980s, and continued until shortly after the advent of 3rd Edition Dungeons & Dragons (D&D) in 2000. It then restarted under the auspices of the company Organized Play, but lasted only two years under that license and then reverted in 2003 to Wizards of the Coast. Living City proved to be a popular concept and "the number of Living City events actually surpassed the 'classic' RPGA tournaments — possibly as early as late 1993". In the first decade of the twenty-first century, RPGA created a variety of living campaigns. The largest was Living Greyhawk, played by thousands of people around the world from 2000 to 2008.

== Organized play programs ==
Shared campaigns have occurred for multiple role-playing games:

Name	Year	Setting/system	Notes	Ref
Ashes of Athas	2011 – 2013	Dark Sun (4th Edition Dungeons & Dragons)	Administered by Baldman Games at conventions such as Winter Fantasy.	
Chronicle for Vampire	2019 – present	Vampire: The Masquerade (5th Edition)	The official campaign produced by Modiphius Entertainment.	
Cypher Play	2016 – present	Numenera, the Cypher System, and The Strange	Organized by Monte Cook Games..	
D&D Encounters	2010 – 2016	Forgotten Realms (4th Edition Dungeons & Dragons, 5th Edition Dungeons & Dragons)	An official Dungeons & Dragons organized play program launched by the RPGA and then administered by the D&D Adventurers League after 2014.	
D&D Expeditions	2014 – 2016	Forgotten Realms (5th Edition Dungeons & Dragons)	An official Dungeons & Dragons organized play program launched by the D&D Adventurers League; envisioned as the living campaign successor.	
Legacy of the Green Regent	2003 – 2006	Forgotten Realms (3.5 Dungeons & Dragons)	The first of the RPGA's Dungeons & Dragons Campaigns program; it also included digital tracking.	
Legends of the Shining Jewel	2003 – present	World of RAIA (3.5 Dungeons & Dragons/Pathfinder)	Transitioned to Pathfinder in 2009.	
Living Arcanis	2001 – 2009	3.5 Dungeons and Dragons	Originally a part of the RPGA, it was then relaunched as a separate program by Paradigm Concepts.	
Legends of Arcanis	2010 – present	Arcanis Roleplaying Game system	Paradigm Concepts relaunch program.	
Living Arcanis 5E	2016 – present	Arcanis (5th Edition Dungeons & Dragons)		
Living City	1987 – 2003	Forgotten Realms (Advanced Dungeons & Dragons, Advanced Dungeons & Dragons 2nd Edition, 3rd Edition Dungeons & Dragons)	The first Living Campaign launched by RPGA; it was a series of adventures set in the city of Raven's Bluff.	
Living Death	1997 – 2007	Masque of the Red Death (Advanced Dungeons & Dragons 2nd Edition, 3rd Edition Dungeons & Dragons, 3.5 Dungeons & Dragons)	A RPGA Living Campaign; the campaign was played in seasons assigned to specific campaign years, from 1890 (1996) through 1899 (2007).	
Living Divine	2011 – 2012	4th Edition Dungeons & Dragons		
Living Force	2001 – 2012	Star Wars Roleplaying Game	A RPGA Living Campaign; the campaign was set in the Mid-Rim Cularin system one year after The Phantom Menace – it jumped forward in time after the release of Attack of the Clones.	
Living Forgotten Realms	2008 – 2014	Forgotten Realms (4th Edition Dungeons & Dragons)	A RPGA Living Campaign; this living campaign utilized the new 4th Edition rules and replaced the 3.5 Edition Living Greyhawk campaign in organized play.	
Living Greyhawk	2000 – 2008	Greyhawk (3rd Edition Dungeons & Dragons, 3.5 Dungeons & Dragons)	A RPGA Living Campaign; the largest RPGA living campaign.	
Living Jungle	1995 – 2003	Forgotten Realms (Advanced Dungeons & Dragons 2nd Edition, 3rd Edition Dungeons & Dragons)	A RPGA Living Campaign; a spinoff from Living City set in Kara-Tur.	
Living Spycraft	2002 – 2007	Spycraft	A RPGA Living Campaign; in 2005, the campaign converted to the Spycraft 2.0 ruleset.	
Mark of Heroes	2004 – 2006	Eberron (3.5 Dungeons & Dragons)	The first RPGA Campaign set in Eberron.	
Pathfinder Society	2008 – present	Pathfinder	The official Pathfinder organized play program.	
Quelmar	2012 – present	The Quelmar Realm (Dungeons & Dragons, Candela Obscura, Swords of the Serpentine, among others.)	Community-driven series of living campaigns which share the single living realm of Quelmar, primarily at conventions and in local chapters.	
Sarbreenar the Living City	1992 – 2008	Forgotten Realms (Advanced Dungeons & Dragons, Advanced Dungeons & Dragons 2nd Edition, 3rd Edition Dungeons & Dragons)	A RPGA Living Campaign; a spinoff from Living City specifically for the United Kingdom.	
Shadowrun Missions	2004 – present	Shadowrun (3rd - 6th Editions)	The official organized campaign setting sponsored by Catalyst Game Labs.	
Starfinder Society	2017 – present	Starfinder Roleplaying Game	The official Starfinder organized play program.	
Star Trek Adventures Living Campaign	2017 – present	Star Trek Adventures	The official organized campaign setting by Modiphius Entertainment.	
Virtual Seattle	1996 – 2004	Shadowrun (2nd - 3rd Editions)	The first non-Dungeons & Dragons RPGA-sponsored campaign; it was replaced by Shadowrun Missions.	
Witch Hunter: Dark Providence	2011 – 2013	Witch Hunter: The Invisible World	A Paradigm Concepts convention program.	
Witch Hunter: Revelations	2007 – 2010	Witch Hunter: The Invisible World	A Paradigm Concepts convention program.	
Xen'drik Expeditions	2006 – 2008	Eberron (3.5 Dungeons & Dragons)	The second RPGA Campaign set in Eberron.	
