= The City of Greyhawk =

- Front cover of The City of Greyhawk boxed set
- Genre: Role-playing game
- Publisher: TSR, Inc.
- Publication date: 1989
- Media type: Boxed set

The City of Greyhawk is a boxed set accessory for the World of Greyhawk campaign setting, part of the Advanced Dungeons & Dragons fantasy role-playing game. It was designed by Doug Niles, Carl Sargent, and Rik Rose, and published by TSR in 1989. It describes the Free City of Greyhawk (the major city of the campaign setting) in detail, and was highly praised by Dragon magazine.

== Contents ==
The City of Greyhawk is a boxed set that details the most prominent city of the World of Greyhawk campaign setting. The Free City of Greyhawk, Gem of the Flanaess, is the adventuring town that gives the World of Greyhawk setting its name. The set includes a detailed fold-out bird's-eye-view of the town, which matches the diagrammatic, keyed-location street map. The map is cross-referenced with one of the booklets to describe the major features of the city. Also included are large maps of the sewers and underground passages, and a map of the surrounding region.

The set describes a wide variety of NPCs, their fellowships and conspiracies, and their associated game mechanics, personalities, tactics, and loose narrative threads. Potential allies, patrons, informants, and enemies are available for any group of characters. External politics are intertwined in the city's internal affairs, and rival guilds compete for power and influence, while dark conspiracies are plotted beneath the streets. One of the booklets includes four adventure scenarios that develop themes and elements already presented in the city background. Twenty-three short adventures are printed on the front and back of a single piece of card stock, and the 24th sheet of card stock summarizes the monster stats for these short adventures. Each adventure develops at least some element of plot, character, or theme presented in the city background material. Some are dungeon crawls, some wilderness expeditions, some city adventures, and some diplomatic intrigues.

== Publication history ==
The City of Greyhawk was designed by Doug Niles, Carl Sargent, and Rik Rose. It was published by TSR in 1989 as a boxed set which included two 96-page paperback books, four full-color 22” × 34” maps, and 24 one-page adventures on card stock.

== Reception ==
Lisa Stevens reviewed The City of Greyhawk for White Wolf #20, rating it 4 out of 5 overall, and stated that "Overall, this product is the most exciting supplement to come out of the TSR stables since the original Player's Handbook took that first giant leap into role-playing. The quality of the writing and production gives the buyer more than his money's worth. The prose is interesting to read and stimulates the creative juices that so many other products leave stagnant."

Ken Rolston reviewed The City of Greyhawk for Dragon magazine #156 (April 1990). He reviewed multiple city supplements in the same review, but said that this was "the most pleasing and playable" of them, and "it has that comfortable, played-in feeling that warms the heart of the experienced AD&D game DM". The maps "combine the virtues of easy reference, graphic detail, sense of place, and pleasing appearance better than any other city supplement I've seen". The four scenarios included in one of the booklets are "simple, complete, appropriate, and admirable examples of city FRPG adventuring", but the "real treasures" are the 23 short adventures printed on the card stock. He described the short adventures as "priceless, many touched with humor and irony, with interesting plot twists; they challenge role-playing and problem-solving. All are eminently practical and playable, and presented with rare charm and simplicity." Noting the inclusion of the Circle of Eight as an example, Rolston commented: "One of the best things about The City of Greyhawk is that it ably exploits all the venerable virtues of the AD&D game. This is the campaign pack that TSR should have produced a decade ago, back when AD&D games were young and fresh. Now it is perhaps a certain nostalgia I indulge in my enjoyment of The City of Greyhawk; this is a package out of the golden age of the AD&D game". Rolston concluded that "The City of Greyhawk is a very good urban FRPG pack, but more than that, it's really a complete campaign setting for the AD&D game, the best I've seen—coherent, playable, well-developed, and entertaining."

Game designer Rick Swan considered the Greyhawk setting "a mess", but called The City of Greyhawk "the most credible attempt at smoothing out the rough spots": "Wisely concentrating on a small section of the world, the set offered a host of intriguing personalities, adventure ideas galore, and best of all, a coherent background."

== Reviews ==
- Review in Games International
