= Crypt of Lyzandred the Mad =

Dungeons & Dragons adventure module

- Rules required: 2nd Ed AD&D
- Campaign setting: Greyhawk
- Authors: Sean K. Reynolds
- First published: 1998

Linked modules
- The Star Cairns; Crypt of Lyzandred the Mad; The Doomgrinder

Crypt of Lyzandred the Mad is an adventure module for the Dungeons & Dragons fantasy roleplaying game, set in the game's World of Greyhawk campaign setting.

== Plot summary ==
The module takes adventurers to the lair of the ancient lich Lyzandred, and focuses on puzzles and mind games to a greater degree than most D&D modules of the period.

== Publication history ==
The module was published by Wizards of the Coast in October 1998 under its recently acquired TSR imprint for the second edition Advanced Dungeons & Dragons rules. Crypt of Lyzandred the Mad is the second of three adventures in the "Lost Tombs" series for the Greyhawk setting. It is therefore a sequel to The Star Cairns and is followed by The Doomgrinder.

== Reviews ==
- Envoyer (German) (Issue 29 - Mar 1999)
