= The Scarlet Brotherhood =

- The Scarlet Brotherhood by Sean K Reynolds; Cover art by Doug Beekman
- Author: Sean K. Reynolds
- Cover artist: Doug Beekman
- Language: English
- Genre: Fantasy; Role-playing game
- Publisher: Wizards of the Coast / TSR
- Publication date: 1999
- Publication place: United States

The Scarlet Brotherhood is a regional sourcebook for the Greyhawk campaign setting for the Dungeons & Dragons fantasy role-playing game.

== Contents ==
The Scarlet Brotherhood detailed the Scarlet Brotherhood lands, the Tilvanot Peninsula, Hepmonaland, and the Amedio Jungle.

The sourcebook was notable for being the first source on the Olman people since The Hidden Shrine of Tamoachan and for detailing many new nations and realms south of the Flanaess for the first time. The Touv people and their pantheon were invented for this book. Several new monsters, including the Bredthrall, and many new plants and flora were created for this book as well.

== Publication history ==
The sourcebook was written by Sean K. Reynolds, and published by TSR in March 1999 for 2nd edition Advanced Dungeons & Dragons.

== Reviews ==
- Backstab #15
- Envoyer #32

== Bibliography ==
- Reynolds, Sean K. The Scarlet Brotherhood. Renton, WA: TSR, 1999.
