= Puppets (module) =

Dungeons & Dragons adventure module

- Cover art by Clyde Caldwell
- Code: WG11
- Authors: Vince Garcia and Bruce Rabe
- First published: December 1989

Puppets is an adventure module published by TSR in 1989 for the fantasy role-playing game Advanced Dungeons & Dragons.

== Plot summary ==
The module details a linear, cross-country, convoy-guard adventure. Puppets is a two-part scenario, in which the player characters first encounter an evil leprechaun while in the Gnarley Wood, and then must investigate tiny burglars in the Free City of Dyvers. This small-town adventure takes place as the PCs hunt for clues to the plot's central mystery.

== Publication history ==
WG11 Puppets was the 11th scenario in the World of Greyhawk adventure line, adapted from two scenarios previously run as RPGA (Role Playing Game Association) tournaments. It was written by Vince Garcia and Bruce Rabe, with artwork by Clyde Caldwell, Allen Nunis, and David Sutherland III and cover art by Clyde Caldwell, and editing and development by Jim Lowder. It was published by TSR in 1989 as a 32-page booklet with an outer folder.

== Reception ==
In the June 1990 edition of Games International (Issue 15), the reviewer pointed out that this adventure "is adapted from two tournament modules, and it shows. If you like the kind of scenario where you can tell what's going to happen by reading the back of the module, you'll love this." The reviewer also noted that "it is more cerebral than combat."

In the July 1991 edition of Dragon (Issue 171), Ken Rolston declared both scenarios "competently presented and playable", saying their primary appeal comes from three very good ideas that he felt could be freely exported into other scenario and adventure settings. He called the adventure designs "sound and reliable, easily scanned and presented by experienced DMs." Rolston concluded by stating, "These make a pair of very good adventures that are easily adapted to other settings, with nifty plot and encounter elements, abundant opportunities for clever play, and plenty of juicy character roles for the DM."

== Reviews ==
- GamesMaster International Issue 1 - Aug 1990
