= 30 Years of Adventure =

2004 book by Harold Johnson

30 Years of Adventure: A Celebration of Dungeons & Dragons
- Author: Harold Johnson, Steve Winter, Peter Adkison, Ed Stark, Peter Archer
- Cover artist: Larry Elmore
- Language: English
- Subject: Dungeons & Dragons
- Publisher: Wizards of the Coast
- Publication date: 2004 (1st edition)
- Publication place: United States
- Media type: Print (Hardback)
- Pages: 283
- ISBN: 0-7869-3498-0
- OCLC: 56961559
- Dewey Decimal: 793.93 22
- LC Class: GV1469.62.D84 A14 2004

30 Years of Adventure: A Celebration of Dungeons & Dragons is a 2004 publisher's retrospective written by Harold Johnson, Steve Winter, Peter Adkison, Ed Stark, and Peter Archer. It is an illustrated, behind-the-scenes history of the Dungeons & Dragons (D&D) fantasy tabletop role-playing game, issued by the game's publisher (Wizards of the Coast) to commemorate the game's 30th anniversary.

== Overview ==
30 Years of Adventure presents the history of D&D in mostly-chronological order, beginning with the creation of the game by Gary Gygax and Dave Arneson, and ending with Hasbro acquiring Wizards of the Coast. It includes chapters devoted to the development history of various D&D campaign settings such as the World of Greyhawk, Dragonlance, and the Forgotten Realms. In keeping with its historical theme, nearly all of the book's artwork is taken from D&D products of the era.

30 Years of Adventure also features short essays by a variety of celebrities (including comedian Stephen Colbert, actor Wil Wheaton, and animator Genndy Tartakovsky), describing their experiences with Dungeons & Dragons. The book's foreword is written by actor Vin Diesel.

== Editions ==
- 2004, United States, Wizards of the Coast (ISBN 0-7869-3498-0), pub date 1 Sep 2004, Hardback
- 2006, United States, Wizards of the Coast (ISBN 0-7869-4078-6), pub date 7 Feb 2006, Paperback
