= Gargoyle (module) =

Dungeons & Dragons adventure module

- Code: WG9
- Rules required: 2nd Ed AD&D
- Character levels: 2 - 4
- Campaign setting: Greyhawk
- Authors: David Collins, Skip Williams
- First published: 1989

Gargoyle is an adventure module for the fantasy role-playing game Dungeons & Dragons, set in the game's World of Greyhawk campaign setting. The module has the code WG9 and was published by TSR, Inc. in 1989 for the second edition Advanced Dungeons & Dragons rules.

== Plot summary ==
Gargoyle is an adventure scenario which takes place in the City of Greyhawk, in which two gargoyles hire the player characters to find their wings which had been stolen from them.

The adventure is set in The Tors, between the Yeomanry and the Crystalmists, and was one of the first 2nd edition modules published.

== Publication history ==
WG9 Gargoyle was written by David Collins with Skip Williams, with cover art by David Dorman, and was published by TSR in 1989 as a 32-page booklet with an outer folder. The module features interior art by David Dorman and Karl Story.
