= Greyhawk =

Dungeons & Dragons fictional campaign setting

- Designers: Gary Gygax
- Publishers: TSR, Inc. Wizards of the Coast
- Publication: 1980
- Genres: Fantasy
- Systems: Dungeons & Dragons
- Chance: Dice rolling

Greyhawk, also known as the World of Greyhawk, is a fictional world designed as a campaign setting for the Dungeons & Dragons fantasy roleplaying game. Although not the first campaign world developed for Dungeons & Dragons—Dave Arneson's Blackmoor campaign predated it by about a year—the world of Greyhawk closely identified with early development of the game beginning in 1972, and after being published it remained associated with Dungeons & Dragons publications until 2008.

The world itself started as simply a dungeon under a castle designed by Gary Gygax for the amusement of his children and friends, but it was rapidly expanded to include not only a complex multi-layered dungeon environment, but also the nearby city of Greyhawk, and eventually an entire world. In addition to the campaign world, which was published in several editions over twenty years, Greyhawk was also used as the setting for many adventures published in support of the game, as well as for RPGA's massively shared Living Greyhawk campaign from 2000 to 2008.

== Setting ==
The World of Greyhawk is located on a planet called Oerth. Oerth has an axial tilt of 30 degrees, which causes greater seasonal temperature variation than on Earth and is controlled by wizardly and divine magic that shifts weather patterns to be more favorable to the populace. Castle Greyhawk was the most famous dungeon in Oerth, the home campaign world of Gary Gygax. Players in the earliest days of this campaign mostly stayed within Castle Greyhawk's dungeons, but Gygax envisioned the rest of his world as a sort of parallel Earth, and the original Oerth (pronounced 'Oith', as with a Brooklyn accent) looked much like the real-world Earth but filled with imaginary cities and countries. Several years later, when TSR produced the original World of Greyhawk folio (1980), Gygax was asked to produce a map of the world and decided to create something new which still featured many of the locales from his original world of Oerth but with new geography. Gygax also connected Dave Arneson's Blackmoor to his world by including a country by that name in Oerth. In his later novel Dance of Demons (1988), Gygax destroyed Greyhawk's Oerth and replaced it with a new fantasy world of Yarth.

The Flanaess is the eastern part of the continent of Oerik, one of the four continents of Oerth, acting as the setting of dozens of adventures published between the 1970s and 2000s. In late 1972, Dave Arneson demonstrated a new type of game to a group of gamers in Lake Geneva, Wisconsin, including game designer Gygax. Gygax agreed to develop a set of rules with Arneson and get the game published; the game eventually became known as Dungeons & Dragons. Gygax designed a set of dungeons underneath the ruins of Castle Greyhawk as a testing ground for new rules, character classes and spells. In those early days, there was no Flanaess; the world map of Oerth was developed by Gygax as circumstances dictated, the new cities and lands simply drawn over a map of North America. Gygax and Kuntz further developed this campaign setting, and by 1976, the lands within a radius of 50 miles had been mapped in depth, and the lands within a radius of approximately 500 miles were in outline form.

Following yet more work, in 1978 Gygax agreed to publish his world and decided to redevelop Oerth from scratch. Once he had sketched out the entire planet to his satisfaction, one hemisphere of Oerth was dominated by a massive continent called Oerik. Gygax decided to concentrate his first efforts on the continent of Oerik and asked TSR's printing house about the maximum size of paper they could handle; the answer was 34 x 22 inches (86 cm x 56 cm). He found that, using the scale he desired, he could fit only the northeast corner of Oerik on two of the sheets. This corner of Oerik became known as "the Flanaess", so named in Gygax's mind because of the peaceful people known as the Flannae who had once lived there. Gygax also added many more new regions, countries and cities, bringing the number of political states to 60.

Needing original placenames for all of the geographical and political places on his map, Gygax sometimes resorted to wordplay based on the names of friends and acquaintances. For instance, Perrenland was named after Jeff Perren, who co-wrote the rules for Chainmail with Gygax; Urnst was a homophone of Ernst (his son Ernie); and Sunndi was a near-homophone of Cindy, another of Gygax's children.

From Gygax's prototype map, Darlene Pekul, a freelance artist in Lake Geneva, developed a full color map on a hex grid. Gygax was so pleased with the result that he quickly switched his home Greyhawk campaign over to the new world he had created. Ultimately, the original Castle Greyhawk was never published for public play, instead with many of the elements of Gygax's original campaign becoming the seed for other adventures.

== Development history ==
=== Early development ===
In the late 1960s, Gary Gygax, a military history buff and pulp fantasy fan, was a central, founding figure in the Castle & Crusade Society. The C&C Society, as it was known, served enthusiasts of miniature wargaming in the Middle Ages and published an occasional newsletter known as the Domesday Book.

Following up on a promise he made in Domesday Book #5, Gygax presented the "Great Kingdom" map c. June 1971 in Domesday #9, to be used as a game setting for the Society. Members thereafter began claiming territories, including member Dave Arneson, who was an officer of the organization, and frequent contributor to the newsletter. Arneson claimed a territory he named Blackmoor, a setting he had already begun developing in his home campaign, and Gygax reserved for himself a territory on lake Nyr Div.

In addition to historically-based medieval wargaming, both Gygax and Arneson were enthusiasts of adding fantasy elements to their games. To this end, Gygax created a fantasy supplement for the Chainmail ruleset for medieval miniatures that he was co-writing with Jeff Perren. Released in the late spring of 1971, this booklet included rules for fantasy monsters, wizards and magical weapons.

Around the same time, in Minneapolis–St. Paul, Dave Arneson, impressed by the "Braunstein" role-playing games of fellow wargamer David Wesely, developed the Barony of Blackmoor as a setting for Braunstein style games. Arneson based his game around the village, castle and dungeons of Blackmoor. The castle itself was represented on the table by an actual plastic kit model of a medieval castle. Arneson informed the players that instead of controlling regiments, they would each take one individual character into the castle of the Barony of Blackmoor to explore its dangerous dungeons. Arneson drew from numerous sources but quickly incorporated the fantasy supplement of Chainmail into his games.

After about a year and half of play, Arneson (Blackmoor) and fellow gamer David Megarry (Dungeon! boardgame) traveled to Lake Geneva in November or December 1972 to pitch their respective games to Gygax, who at that time was a representative of the Guidon Games company. Gygax was immediately intrigued by the concept of individual characters exploring a dungeon setting. He and Arneson agreed to co-develop a set of rules, and Gygax quickly developed a castle and dungeon of his own, "Castle Greyhawk", set within his portion of the Great Kingdom map. Castle Greyhawk is sometimes considered the first dungeon in Dungeons & Dragons and pioneered the roots of the mega-dungeon format of gaming.

Two of his children, Ernie and Elise, were the first players, and during their first session, as Tenser and Ahlissa, they fought and destroyed the first monsters of the Greyhawk dungeon; Gygax recalled them as being either giant centipedes or a nest of scorpions. During the same session, Ernie and Elise also found the first treasure, a chest of 3,000 copper coins which was too heavy to carry, much to the children's chagrin. After his children had gone to bed, Gygax immediately began working on a second level for the dungeon. At the next play session, Ernie and Elise were joined by Gygax's friends: Don Kaye, Rob Kuntz, and Terry Kuntz.

About a month after his first session, Gygax created the nearby city of Greyhawk, where the players' characters could sell their treasure and find a place to rest.

=== Home campaign (1972–1979) ===
As Gygax and Arneson worked to develop and publish the rules for Dungeons & Dragons through TSR, Gygax continued to design and present the dungeons and environs of Castle Greyhawk to his circle of friends and family, using them as playtesters for new rules and concepts. As the players began to explore more of the world outside of the castle and city, Gygax developed other regions and cities for them. With play sessions occurring seven or more times a week, Gygax did not have the time or inclination to create the map for a whole new world; he simply drew his world over a map of North America, adding new cities and regions as his world slowly grew through ongoing adventures. The city and castle of Greyhawk were placed near the real-world position of Chicago, his birthplace; various other places were clustered around it. For instance, the rival city of Dyvers he placed in the area of real-world Milwaukee.

Gygax also continued to develop the dungeons underneath the castle. By the time he was finished, the complex labyrinth encompassed thirteen levels filled with devious traps, secret passageways, hungry monsters, and glittering treasure. Although details of these original Greyhawk dungeons have never been published in detail, Gygax gave some glimpses of them in an article he wrote for the European fanzine Europa in 1975:

Before the rules for D&D were published, "Old Greyhawk Castle" was 13 levels deep. The first level was a simple maze of rooms and corridors, for none of the "participants" had ever played such a game before. The second level had two unusual items, a Nixie pool and a fountain of snakes. The third featured a torture chamber and small cells and prison rooms. The fourth was a level of crypts and undead. The fifth was centered around a strange font of black fire and gargoyles. The sixth was a repeating maze with dozens of wild hogs... in inconvenient spots, naturally backed up by appropriate numbers of Wereboars. The seventh was centered around a circular labyrinth and a street of masses of ogres. The eighth through tenth levels were caves and caverns featuring Trolls, giant insects and a transporter nexus with an evil Wizard (with a number of tough associates) guarding it. The eleventh level was the home of the most powerful wizard in the castle: He had Balrogs as servants. The remainder of the level was populated by Martian White Apes, except the sub-passage system underneath the corridors which was full of poisonous critters with no treasure. Level twelve was filled with Dragons.

The bottom level, number thirteen, contained an inescapable slide which took the players clear through 'to China', from whence they had to return via "Outdoor Adventure". It was quite possible to journey downward by an insidious series of slanting passages which began on the second level, but the likelihood of following such a route unknowingly did not become too great until the seventh or eighth level...

Side levels included a barracks with Orcs, Hobgoblins, and Gnolls continually warring with each other, a museum, a huge arena, an underground lake, a Giant's home, and a garden of fungi.

Anyone who made it to the bottom level alive met Zagyg, the insane architect of the dungeons. Zagyg is a reverse homophone of Gygax, and it was Gygax's inside joke that the person who had designed the dungeon—himself—must be insane. Only three players ever made it to the bottom level and met Zagyg, all of them during solo adventures: Rob Kuntz (playing Robilar), Gygax's son Ernie (playing Tenser), and Rob's brother Terry (playing Terik). Their reward was to be instantly transported to the far side of the world, where they each faced a long solo trek back to the city of Greyhawk. Terik and Tenser managed to catch up to Robilar along the way, and the three journeyed back to Greyhawk together.

By this time, a dozen players crowded Gygax's basement every night, with over 20 at times on weekends and the effort needed to plan their adventures took up much of Gygax's spare time. He had been very impressed with Rob Kuntz's imaginative play as a player, and appointed Rob to be co-Dungeon Master of Greyhawk. This freed up Gygax to work on other projects, and also gave him an opportunity to participate as a player, creating characters like Yrag and Mordenkainen.

In order to make room for Rob Kuntz's dungeons, Gygax scrapped his bottom level and integrated Rob's work into the Greyhawk dungeons. Gygax and Kuntz continued to develop new levels for their players, and by the time the Greyhawk home campaign drew to a close in 1985, the castle dungeons encompassed more than fifty levels.

==== Significant player characters ====
While many players participating in the Gygax and Kuntz home campaign were occasional players, sometimes not even naming their characters, others played far more frequently, and several of their characters became well known to the general gaming world before publication of the Greyhawk campaign setting. Some of these characters became known when Gygax mentioned them in his various columns, interviews, and publications. In other cases, when Gygax created a new magical spell for the game, he would sometimes use the name of a wizard character from his home campaign to add verisimilitude to the spell name, such as Melf's acid arrow, Melf being a character created by his son Luke. Some of the characters who became synonymous with Greyhawk at that time included:

- Murlynd: Gary Gygax's friend Don Kaye created Murlynd for the second-ever session of Gygax's Greyhawk campaign in 1972. Gygax later recalled that Murlynd was the first attempt by a player to make a creative name for a character; in the early days, most players—including Gygax himself—simply used their own name as a basis for their character's name, e.g. Gary was Yrag, etc. According to Robert Kuntz, Murlynd did not get his trademark "six-shooters" in actual play, but they were given to the character in tribute to Don Kaye's love of the Western genre. Although Gygax did not allow the use of gunpowder in his Greyhawk setting, he made a loophole for Don Kaye by ruling that Murlynd actually carried two magical wands that made loud noises and delivered small but deadly missiles. His name is used for the Unearthed Arcana item, Murlynd's Spoon.
- Robilar: Robilar was a fighter belonging to Rob Kuntz. Like Murlynd, Robilar was also created for the second-ever session beneath Castle Greyhawk in 1972, rolled up on Gygax's kitchen table. Gygax suggested to Kuntz the name of Robilar, after a minor character in Gygax's novella The Gnome Cache. Because Kuntz was a constant player, Robilar rapidly gained power and possessions. As the city of Greyhawk was developed, he also became the secret owner of the Green Dragon Inn in the city of Greyhawk, where he kept tabs on happenings in the city. Kuntz quickly grew impatient with play when it involved more than a couple of players, and often played solo adventures one-on-one with Gygax. Robilar was not only the first to reach the 13th and bottom level of Gygax's Greyhawk dungeons, but on the way, he was also responsible for freeing nine demi-gods (whom Gygax revived a decade later as some of the first deities of Greyhawk: Iuz, Ralishaz, Trithereon, Erythnul, Olidammara, Heironeous, Celestian, Hextor, and Obad-Hai). Robilar was also the first to enter Gygax's Temple of Elemental Evil, and conquered it completely. Robilar also freed the demoness Zuggtmoy from her prison at the centre of the Temple. Kuntz later related that Gygax was very dismayed that his masterpiece dungeon had been destroyed by a single adventurer, and as punishment, Gygax had an army pursue Robilar back to his castle, which he had to abandon. Robilar also lost possession of the Green Dragon Inn.
- Tenser: Tenser was a wizard played by Gygax's son Ernie. In the earliest days of Greyhawk, Ernie often gamed with Rob Kuntz (Robilar) and Terry Kuntz (Terik). At one point, using their combined forces of loyal henchmen, the three controlled access to the first level of the Greyhawk dungeons while they ransacked the lower levels. Tenser became the second character to reach the thirteenth (and bottom, at the time) level of the Greyhawk dungeons, when he noticed that Robilar was missing and went in search of him. Gary Gygax included the name Tenser in the names of two spells, Tenser's floating disc and Tenser's transformation.
- Terik (or Teric) was a character created by Terry Kuntz. Terik often adventured with Tenser and Robilar in the days when the three controlled the first level of the dungeons of Greyhawk. Terik became the third and last character to reach the bottom level of Gygax's original Greyhawk dungeon when he noticed Robilar and Tenser were missing and went in search of them.
- Erac's Cousin: Gary Gygax's son Ernie originally had a character he called Erac. Later, he created a wizard who, due to a personal issue as part of his backstory, refused to reveal his name, simply referring to himself as Erac's Cousin. Gary Gygax knew that Ernie liked the Barsoom stories of Edgar Rice Burroughs, and at one point, transported Erac's Cousin to a Barsoom-like Mars, where the inhabitants refused to let the wizard use magic. Erac's Cousin was forced to become a fighter instead, and learned to fight proficiently with two weapons simultaneously. Eventually he was able to teleport back to Oerth, but when he acquired two vorpal blades, Rob Kuntz and Gary Gygax decided he had become too powerful, and lured him into a demon's clutches. The demon took him to an alternative plane that drained the magic from the vorpal blades, destroying them.
- Yrag: After Gygax made Kuntz a co-DM, this fighter was Gygax's first character, and Gygax often referred to Yrag's various adventures in columns and interviews. Yrag is simply Gary spelled backwards.
- Mordenkainen: This was perhaps Gygax's most famous character, and also his favorite. Mordenkainen was created in early 1973, and his name was drawn from Finnish mythology. Due to constant play, often with Rob Kuntz as DM, Gygax advanced Mordenkainen into a powerful character. Gygax never revealed exactly how powerful Mordenkainen was, simply stating that the wizard had "twenty-something levels". Even years after he last played Mordenkainen, he would not disclose any of Mordenkainen's powers or possessions. Various spells from first edition bear his name, such as Mordenkainen's faithful hound, Mordenkainen's lucubration, and Mordenkainen's sword.
- Bigby: Bigby started life as an evil low-level wizard non-player character in Rob Kuntz's dungeons of Greyhawk. Gary Gygax, playing Mordenkainen, managed to subdue him, and forced Bigby to become his servant. After a long time and several adventures, Mordenkainen managed to convince Bigby to leave his evil ways behind, and Kuntz ruled that Bigby had changed from an enemy to a loyal henchman, and therefore Gygax could take over Bigby as a player character. Thereafter, Gygax developed Bigby into a powerful wizard second only to Mordenkainen, and used his name to describe a series of hand spells, e.g. Bigby's crushing hand and Bigby's grasping hand. For a time after this, Rob Kuntz ruled that all the names of Mordenkainen's future henchmen had to rhyme with Bigby. This resulted in Zigby the dwarf; Rigby the cleric; Sigby Griggbyson the fighter; Bigby's apprentice, Nigby; and Digby, Mordenkainen's new apprentice who replaced Bigby.
- Melf: Melf was an elven character created by Gary Gygax's son Luke. Gary Gygax borrowed Melf's name for the spell Melf's acid arrow.
- Rary: Rary was a wizard created by Brian Blume and played only until he reached the 3rd level, at which point Blume retired him, having reached his objective, which was to be able to call his character "Medium Rary". Gygax borrowed the name for the spells Rary's mnemonic enhancer and Rary's telepathic bond.
- Otto: Otto, like Bigby, started life as an evil non-player character wizard in the dungeons of Greyhawk. Tenser and Robilar defeated him in combat, and when given a choice of which master to serve, Otto chose to serve Robilar, thereby becoming a character controlled by Robilar's creator, Rob Kuntz. Thereafter, Otto accompanied Robilar on many adventures, including Robilar's destruction of the Temple of Elemental Evil. Gary Gygax borrowed Otto's name for the spell Otto's irresistible dance.
- Drawmij: Drawmij was a wizard created by Jim Ward—Drawmij is simply his name spelled backwards. Gygax borrowed Drawmij's name for the magical spell Drawmij's instant summons.
- The Circle of Eight: At the point where Gygax's own characters in the Greyhawk home campaign had collectively accumulated both enough wealth that they could not easily spend it, and a standing army that rivalled most nations' forces, he gathered all eight of the characters—Mordenkainen (wizard), Yrag (fighter), Bigby (wizard), Rigby (cleric), Zigby (dwarf), Felnorith (fighter), Vram (elf) & Vin (elf)—together as the Circle of Eight. Pooling their resources, Gygax had the Eight construct a stronghold in the middle of an evil land so they would not have to travel far to find adventure. After three years of game time, the result was the Obsidian Citadel, an octagonal castle which housed the Circle of Eight and their armies. After Gygax was ousted from TSR, Carl Sargent and Rik Rose remolded Gygax's old "Circle of Eight" in The City of Greyhawk boxed set into a new plot device. Instead of a group of eight companions belonging to Gygax, who sallied forth from an impregnable bastion to fight evil, the Circle became eight wizards brought together by Gygax's own creation now owned by TSR, Mordenkainen. Game designer Ken Rolston described this new Circle of Eight as "a powerful and influential local organization of wizards". Wolfgang Baur found the Circle of Eight a small but knowledgable organization, central to the mythos of the Greyhawk setting, with all its members being important.

==== Greyhawk firsts ====
===== The first publication to mention Greyhawk =====
Gary Gygax wrote a short story titled "The Expedition Into the Black Reservoir", subtitled "A Dungeon Adventure at Greyhawk Castle", which was published in the August 1974 issue of Chicago small press magazine El Conquistador.

===== The first mention of Oerth =====
In the first issue of The Dragon published in June 1976, Gygax prefaced Chapter 1 of his serialized novella The Gnome Cache with a note that the story's setting, Oerth, was very similar to Earth in terms of geography.

===== The first deities of Greyhawk =====
One facet of culture that Gygax did not address during the first few years of his home campaign was organized religion. Since his campaign was largely built around the needs of lower-level characters, he did not think specific deities were necessary, since direct interaction between a god and a low-level character was very unlikely. Some of his players took matters into their own hands, calling upon Norse or Greek gods such as Odin or Zeus, or even Conan's Crom in times of dire need. However, some of the players wanted Gygax to create and customize a specific deity so that cleric characters could receive their powers from someone less ambiguous than the gods. Gygax jokingly created two gods: Saint Cuthbert—who brought non-believers around to his point of view with whacks of his cudgel —and Pholtus, whose fanatical followers refused to believe that any other gods existed. Because both of these deities represented aspects of Good, Gygax eventually created a few evil deities to provide some villainy.

In Chapter 2 of The Gnome Cache, which appeared in the second issue of The Dragon, a shrine to St. Cuthbert (spelled St. Cuthburt) was mentioned, which was the first published reference to a Greyhawk deity.

===== The first Greyhawk novel =====
In 1976, Gygax invited the science fiction/fantasy writer Andre Norton to play Dungeons & Dragons in his Greyhawk world. Norton subsequently wrote Quag Keep, which involved a group of gamers who travel from the real world to Greyhawk. It was the first novel to be set, at least partially, in the Greyhawk setting, and according to Alternative Worlds, the first to be based on D&D. Quag Keep was excerpted in issue #12 of The Dragon (February 1978) just prior to the book's release.

===== The first Greyhawk adventures published by TSR =====
From 1976 to 1979, Gygax also shared some glimpses of his home campaign with other gamers when he set several TSR Dungeons & Dragons adventures in the world of Greyhawk:

- Lost Caverns of Tsojconth (1976), republished in 1982 as S4 Lost Caverns of Tsojcanth
- S1 Tomb of Horrors (1978)
- G1 Steading of the Hill Giant Chief (1978)
- G2 Glacial Rift of the Frost Giant Jarl (1978)
- G3 Hall of the Fire Giant King (1978)
- D1 Descent into the Depths of the Earth (1978)
- D2 Shrine of the Kuo-Toa (1978)
- D3 Vault of the Drow (1978)
- T1 The Village of Hommlet (1978)

In addition, Lawrence Schick set his 1979 TSR adventure S2 White Plume Mountain in Greyhawk.

Despite fan curiosity, the original Castle Greyhawk was never officially published outside of Gygax's home campaign.

=== The World of Greyhawk folio edition (1980) ===
Supplement I: Greyhawk, written by Gary Gygax and Rob Kuntz, was an expansion of the Dungeon & Dragons rules that contained no material about the Greyhawk campaign world other than two brief references.

In 1975, Gygax and Kuntz published a booklet called Supplement I: Greyhawk, an expansion of the rules for Dungeons & Dragons based on their play experiences in the Greyhawk campaign. Although it detailed new spells and character classes that had been developed in the dungeons of Greyhawk, it did not contain any details of their Greyhawk campaign world. The only two references to Greyhawk were an illustration of a large stone head in a dungeon corridor titled The Great Stone Face, Enigma of Greyhawk and mention of a fountain on the second level of the dungeons that continuously issued an endless number of snakes.

The 2004 publication 30 Years of Adventure: A Celebration of Dungeons & Dragons suggested that details of Gygax's Greyhawk campaign were published in this booklet, but Gygax had no plans in 1975 to publish details of the Greyhawk world, since he believed that new players of Dungeons & Dragons would rather create their own worlds than use someone else's. In addition, he did not want to publish all the material he had created for his players; he thought he would be unlikely to recoup a fair investment for the thousands of hours he had spent on it. Since his secrets would be revealed to his players, he would be forced to recreate a new world for them afterward.

With the release of the AD&D Players Handbook in 1978, many players were intrigued by the connection of Greyhawk characters to magical spells such as Tenser's floating disc, Bigby's crushing hand, and Mordenkainen's faithful hound. The AD&D Dungeon Masters Guide, released the following year, also made references to the dungeons of Castle Greyhawk. Players' curiosity was further piqued by the ten Dungeons & Dragons modules set in Greyhawk that were published between 1976 and 1979. Several of Gygax's regular columns in Dragon magazine also mentioned details of his home campaign and characters that inhabited his world. Gygax was surprised when he found out that players wanted to use Greyhawk as their campaign world.

==== Development of geography ====
Rather than using his own version of the Great Kingdom map, which included local areas based on real-world maps, Gygax decided to create an entirely new and greatly expanded version of Oerth. Needing many more original names for all of the geographical and political places on his map for the new and expanded areas, Gygax sometimes resorted to wordplay. He had previously used Perrenland on the Great Kingdom map, named after Jeff Perren, who co-wrote the rules for Chainmail with Gygax, but for the new Greyhawk map he added many more such names of friends and acquaintances. For instance, Urnst was a homophone of Ernst (his son Ernie) and Sunndi was a near-homophone of Cindy, another of Gygax's children.

Gygax gave only the most basic descriptions of each state; he expected that DMs would customize the setting in order to make it an integral part of their own individual campaigns. His map included arctic wastes, desert, temperate forests, tropical jungles, mountainous cordillera, seas and oceans, rivers, archipelagos and volcanoes.

==== Development of history and politics ====
Gygax set out to create a fractious place where chaos and evil were in the ascendant and courageous champions would be needed. In order to explain how his world had arrived at this state, he wrote an outline of a thousand years of history. As a military history buff, he was very familiar with the concept of waves of cultural invasions, such the Picts of Great Britain being invaded by the Celts, who were in turn invaded by the Romans. In creating a similar pattern of history for his world, Gygax decided that a thousand years before his campaign began, the northeast corner of the continent had been occupied by a peaceful but primitive people called the Flannae, whose name was the root for the name of that part of Oerik, the Flanaess. At that time, far to the west of the Flanaess, two peoples were at war, the Bakluni and the Suloise. The war reached its climax when both sides used powerful magic to obliterate each other, in an event called the Twin Cataclysms. Refugees of these disasters were forced out of their lands, and the Suloise invaded the Flanaess, forcing the Flannae to flee to the outer edges of the continent. Several centuries later, a new invader appeared, the Oeridians, and they in turn forced the Suloise southward. One tribe of the Oeridians, the Aerdi, began to set up an empire. Several centuries later, the Aerdi's Great Kingdom ruled most of the Flanaess. The Aerdi overkings marked the beginning of what they believed would be perpetual peace with Year 1 of a new calendar, the Common Year (CY) Reckoning. However, several centuries later, the Empire became decadent, with their rulers losing their sanity, turning to evil, and enslaving their people. When the overking Ivid V came to the throne, the oppressed peoples rebelled.

It was at this point, in the year 576 CY, that Gygax set the world of Greyhawk. As Gygax wrote in his World of Greyhawk folio: "The current state of affairs in the Flanaess is confused indeed. Humankind is fragmented into isolationist realms, indifferent nations, evil lands, and states striving for good". Gygax did not issue monthly or yearly updates to the state of affairs as presented in the folio since he saw 576 CY as a common starting point for every home campaign; because each would be moving forward at its own pace, there would be no practical way to issue updates that would be relevant to every Dungeon Master.

Gygax was also aware that different players would be using his world for different reasons. When he was the Dungeon Master of his home campaign, he found that his players were more interested in dungeon-delving than politics, but when he switched roles and became a player, often going one-on-one with Rob Kuntz as Dungeon Master, Gygax immersed his own characters in politics and large-scale battles. Knowing that there would be some players looking for a town in which to base their campaign, and others interested in politics or warfare, Gygax tried to include as much detail as possible about each region, including a short description of the region and its people, the title of its ruler, the racial makeup of its people, its resources and major cities, and its allies and enemies.

For the same reason that he had created a variety of geographical, political and racial settings, he also strove to create a world with some good, some evil, and some undecided areas. He felt that some players would be happiest playing in a mainly good country and fighting the evil that arose to threaten it; others might want to be a part of an evil country; and still others might take a neutral stance and simply try to collect gold and treasure from both sides.

==== Publication ====
TSR originally intended to publish The World of Greyhawk (TSR 9025) early in 1979, but it was not released until August 1980. The World of Greyhawk consisted of a 32-page folio (the first edition is often called the World of Greyhawk folio to distinguish it from later editions) and a 34" x 44" (86 cm x 112 cm) two-piece color map of the Flanaess. Reviewers were generally impressed, but some remarked on the lack of a pantheon of Greyhawk-specific deities, as well as the lack of any mention of the infamous dungeons of Castle Greyhawk.

Game designer Jim Bambra found the original set "disappointing", because "there is only so much information you can cram into a 32-page booklet, particularly when covering such a large area".

=== Between editions (1980–1983) ===
Before the folio edition was released, Gygax planned to publish supplementary information, using his column "From the Sorcerer's Scroll" that appeared on a semi-regular basis in TSR's Dragon Magazine.

In the May 1980 issue, Gygax gave a quick overview of the development of his new The World of Greyhawk folio. For players who planned to use large scale army tactics, he gave details of the private armies that were commanded by some prominent Greyhawk characters from his original home game: Bigby, Mordenkainen, Robilar, Tenser and Erac's Cousin. Gygax also mentioned some of the planned Greyhawk publications he was overseeing: a large-scale map of the city of Greyhawk; some adventure modules set in Greyhawk; a supplementary map of lands outside the Flanaess; all fifty levels of Castle Greyhawk's dungeon; and miniatures army combat rules. None of these projects, other than a few of the adventure modules, were published by TSR.

Although Gygax originally intended to immediately publish more details of Greyhawk in Dragon on a regular basis, other projects intervened, and it was not until the August 1981 issue of Dragon that Len Lakofka, in his column "Leomund's Tiny Hut", outlined methods for determining a character's place of birth and languages spoken. Gygax added an addendum concerning the physical appearances of the main Greyhawk races. In the November 1981 issue, Gygax gave further details of racial characteristics and modes of dress.

In the December 1982 issue, David Axler contributed a system for determining weather in the world of Greyhawk. Gygax later said he thought a system of fourteen charts for determining the weather was too cumbersome, and he personally did not use it in his home campaign.

==== More information about every political region ====
The folio edition had thirty two pages, and information about each region was condensed into a short paragraph or two. Gygax realized that some players needed more in-depth information about the motivations and aspirations of each region, and the history of interactions with surrounding regions. With this in mind, Gygax decided to publish a much longer description of each region in Dragon. The first two articles, covering seventeen regions, appeared in the December 1981 and January 1982 issues. Due to his involvement in many other TSR projects, Gygax handed responsibility for completion of this project to Rob Kuntz, who covered the remaining forty three regions in the March, July and September 1982 issues. Next to the setting's deities, the political realms were the major influence shaping its fictional history.

==== Deities of Greyhawk ====
In the August 1982 issue of Dragon, Gygax gave advice on how to adapt deities from the previously published Deities and Demigods for worship by non-human races in the Greyhawk world. A few months later, he published a five-part series of articles in the November 1982 through March 1983 issues of Dragon that outlined a pantheon of deities custom-made for humans in the world of Greyhawk. In addition to his original Greyhawk deities, St. Cuthbert and Pholtus, Gygax added seventeen more deities. Although later versions of the campaign setting would assign most of these deities to worship by specific races of humans, at this time they were generally worshiped by all humans of the Flanaess.

Shortly after the release of the folio edition, TSR released the adventure module C1 The Hidden Shrine of Tamoachan, designed to familiarize players with the Olman race of the Amedio Jungle. Largely based on Aztec and Incan cultures, this adventure introduced the first published deities of the Greyhawk campaign: Mictlantecuhtli, god of death, darkness, murder and the underworld; Tezcatlipoca, god of sun, moon, night, scheming, betrayals and lightning; and Quetzalcoatl, god of air, birds and snakes. This area was further explored in The Scarlet Brotherhood (1999), which expanded the Olman pantheon, and newly introduced the Touv people, including their nine gods.

==== Non-player characters of Greyhawk ====
Also included in the March 1983 issue of Dragon was an article detailing four unique Greyhawk characters. The first two quasi-deities—Heward and Keoghtom—had been created by Gygax as non-player characters (NPCs). The third, Murlynd, was a character that had been created by Gygax's childhood friend Don Kaye before Kaye's untimely death in 1975. The fourth, a hero-deity named Kelanen, was developed to illustrate the "principle of advancement of power".

==== TSR Greyhawk adventures published after the folio edition ====
Of the ten adventures set in Greyhawk published by TSR before the folio edition, all but one had been written by Gygax. However, the new availability of information about Gygax's campaign world and TSR's desire to make it central to Dungeons & Dragons encouraged many new writers to set their adventures in Greyhawk. This, combined with the fact that Gygax was increasingly involved in other areas of the company, meant that of the seventeen Greyhawk adventures published in the two years after the folio edition, only four were written or co-written by Gygax:

- S3 Expedition to the Barrier Peaks (Gary Gygax, 1980)
- A1 Slave Pits of the Undercity (David Cook, 1980)
- A2 Secret of the Slavers' Stockade (Harold Johnson & Tom Moldvay, 1981)
- A3 Assault on the Aerie of the Slave Lords (Allen Hammack, 1981 )
- A4 In the Dungeons of the Slave Lords (Lawrence Schick, 1981)
- Q1 Queen of the Demonweb Pits (David C. Sutherland III & Gary Gygax, 1980)
- C1 The Hidden Shrine of Tamoachan (Harold Johnson & Jeff R. Leason, 1980)
- C2 The Ghost Tower of Inverness (Allen Hammack, 1980)
- I1 Dwellers of the Forbidden City (David Cook, 1981)
- L1 The Secret of Bone Hill (Lenard Lakofka, 1981)
- U1 Sinister Secret of Saltmarsh (Dave Browne & Don Turnbull, 1981)
- U2 Danger at Dunwater (Dave Browne & Don Turnbull, 1982)
- N1 Against the Cult of the Reptile God (Douglas Niles, 1982)
- WG4 The Forgotten Temple of Tharizdun (Gary Gygax, 1982)
- S4 Lost Caverns of Tsojcanth (Gary Gygax, 1982) Originally published as Lost Caverns of Tsojconth in 1976
- U3 The Final Enemy (Dave Browne & Don Turnbull, 1983)
- L2 The Assassin's Knot (Lenard Lakofka, 1983)

In 1981, TSR also published the super-modules D1-2 Descent into the Depths of the Earth and G1-2-3 Against the Giants, both being compilations of previously published modules from the Drow series and the Giant series respectively.

Numerous projects were planned to add more depth and detail to the setting after the publication of the initial folio, but many of these projects never appeared for various reasons.

=== World of Greyhawk boxed set (1983) ===
The box cover for World of Greyhawk Fantasy Game Setting boxed set (TSR, 1983).

In 1983, TSR published an expanded boxed set of the campaign world, World of Greyhawk, which is usually called the Greyhawk boxed set to differentiate it from other editions. According to game designer Jim Bambra, "the second edition was much larger than the first and addressed itself to making the World of Greyhawk setting a more detailed and vibrant place". This edition quadrupled the number of pages from the original edition to 128, adding significantly greater detail. One major addition was a pantheon of deities: in addition to the nineteen deities outlined by Gygax in his Dragon article, another thirty-one new deities were added, though only three received full write-ups of their abilities and worshipers. This brought the number of Greyhawk deities to an even fifty. For the next eight years, Greyhawk would be primarily defined by the information in this publication.

=== After publication of the boxed set (1984–1985) ===
Publication of the World of Greyhawk was the first step in Gygax's vision for Oerth. Over the next few years, he planned to unveil other areas of the continent of Oerik, giving each new area the same in-depth treatment of history, geography, and politics as had been accorded the Flanaess. Gygax had also mapped out the other hemisphere of Oerth in his personal notes. Part of this would be Gygax's work, but Len Lakofka and François Froideval had also created material that Gygax wanted to place on Oerth. Frank Mentzer, Creative Consultant at TSR at the time, wrote four RPGA tournament adventures taken from his home campaign setting of Aquaria (published by TSR as the first four of the R-series modules: R1 To the Aid of Falx, R2 The Investigation of Hydell, R3 The Egg of the Phoenix, and R4 Doc's Island). Mentzer envisioned them as the first part of a new Aqua-Oeridian campaign set somewhere on Oerth outside of the Flanaess.

However, by this time, Gygax was in Hollywood on a semi-permanent basis, approving scripts for the Saturday morning Dungeons & Dragons cartoon series and trying to land a deal for a D&D film. Not only was Gygax's own output of Greyhawk-related materials greatly reduced, but the company began to shift its focus and resources away from Greyhawk to a new campaign setting called Dragonlance.

Saga of Old City by Gary Gygax (TSR, 1985); cover art by Clyde Caldwell. The first Greyhawk Adventures novel, and the first featuring "Gord the Rogue".

The success of the Dragonlance series of modules and books pushed aside the World of Greyhawk setting, as TSR concentrated on expanding and defining the world of Krynn. One of the factors that contributed to the success of the Dragonlance setting when it was published in 1984 was a series of concurrent novels by Tracy Hickman and Margaret Weis. Gygax realized that novels set in Greyhawk could have a similar benefit for his campaign world and wrote Saga of Old City, the first in a series of novels that would be published under the banner Greyhawk Adventures. The protagonist was Gord the Rogue, and this first novel told of his rise from the Slum Quarters of the city of Greyhawk to become a world traveler and thief extraordinaire. The novel was designed to promote sales of the boxed set by providing colorful details about the social customs and peoples of various cities and countries around the Flanaess.

Before Saga of Old City was released in November 1985, Gygax wrote a sequel, Artifact of Evil. He also wrote a short story, "At Moonset Blackcat Comes", that appeared in the special 100th issue of Dragon in August of the same year. This introduced Gord the Rogue to gamers just before Saga of Old City was scheduled to be released.

==== Greyhawk modules ====
In the two years after the Greyhawk boxed set appeared, TSR published eight adventures set in Greyhawk. Five were written or co-written by Gygax, and the other three were from TSR's United Kingdom division:

- EX1 Dungeonland (Gary Gygax, 1983)
- EX2 Land Beyond the Magic Mirror (Gary Gygax, 1983)

Both of the EX adventures, although nominally set in Greyhawk, transported characters through a planar gate into an alternate reality.

- UK1 Beyond the Crystal Cave (Dave Brown, Tom Kirby & Graeme Morris, 1983)
- UK2 The Sentinel (Graeme Morris, 1983)
- UK3 The Gauntlet (Graeme Morris, 1984)
- WG5 Mordenkainen's Fantastic Adventure (Robert Kuntz & Gary Gygax, 1984)
- WG6 Isle of the Ape (Gary Gygax, 1985)
- T1–4 The Temple of Elemental Evil (Gary Gygax & Frank Mentzer, 1985)

==== Dragon articles ====
From 1983 to 1985, the only notable supplement for the Greyhawk world was a five-part article by Len Lakofka in the June–October and December 1984 issues of Dragon that detailed the Suel gods who had been briefly mentioned in the boxed set. In the December 1984 issue, Gygax mentioned clerics of non-human races and indicated that the twenty four demihuman and humanoid deities that had been published in the February–June 1982 issues of Dragon were now permitted in Greyhawk; this increased the number of Greyhawk deities from fifty to seventy four.

Other than those articles, Greyhawk was only mentioned in passing in three other issues until Gygax's "Gord the Rogue" short story in the August 1985 issue Dragon. Gygax then provided some errata for the boxed set in the September 1985 issue, which was the last mention of the Greyhawk world in Dragon for almost two years.

==== Gygax departs ====
Shortly after the release of the boxed set, Gygax discovered that while he had been in Hollywood, TSR had run into serious financial difficulties. Returning to Lake Geneva, Gygax managed to get TSR back on firm financial footing, but different visions of TSR's future caused a power struggle within the company, and Gygax was forced out of TSR on December 31, 1985.

=== Greyhawk without Gygax (1986–1987) ===
After Gygax left TSR, the continued development of Greyhawk became the work of many writers and creative minds. Rather than continuing forward with Gygax's plan for an entire planet, the setting was never expanded beyond the Flanaess, nor would other authors' work be linked to unexplored areas of the continent Oerik. According to Gygax, TSR's stewardship turned Greyhawk into something very different from what he had envisioned.

In 1986, in the months following Gygax's ousting, TSR turned away from development of Greyhawk and focused its energies on a new campaign setting called Forgotten Realms. In 1986 and 1987, only three Greyhawk modules were released, A1-4 Scourge of the Slave Lords, S1-4 Realms of Horror and GDQ1-7 Queen of the Spiders, all being collections of previously published modules rather than new material.

==== Greyhawk novels continue without Gord the Rogue ====
Gygax's novel Saga of Old City, released in November 1985, and Artifact of Evil, released two months after Gygax's departure from TSR, proved to be popular titles, and in 1987, TSR hired Rose Estes to continue the series, albeit without Gord the Rogue, to whom Gygax had retained all rights. From 1987 to 1989, Estes produced five more novels under the Greyhawk Adventures banner: Master Wolf, The Price of Power, The Demon Hand, The Name of the Game, and The Eyes Have It. A sixth book, Dragon in Amber, appeared in 1990 book catalogs, but was never written, and the series was discontinued.

==== The dungeons of Greyhawk revealed ====
In its 1986 Summer Mail Order Hobby Shop catalog, TSR had listed a new Greyhawk adventure called WG7 Shadowlords, a high-level adventure to be written by Gary Gygax and Skip Williams. This adventure was canceled after Gygax left TSR, and the catalog number WG7 was reassigned to a new adventure, Castle Greyhawk, released in 1988. It was the first new Greyhawk adventure in three years, but it had nothing to do with Gygax's original Castle Greyhawk. Instead, it was a compilation of twelve humorous dungeon levels, each one written by a freelance author. The puns and jokes often referenced modern culture—the Amazing Driderman, King Burger, Bugsbear Bunny, and the crew of Star Trek—and the module also included an appearance by Gygax's Mordenkainen in a film studio.

=== Greyhawk revived (1988–1990) ===
By 1988, with the first series of Dragonlance adventures drawing to a close, and Forgotten Realms doing very well, TSR turned back to Greyhawk. In the January 1988 issue of Dragon, Jim Ward - one of the original players in the dungeons of Greyhawk, creator of the wizard Drawmij, and now working for TSR in the post-Gygax era - requested player-input about what should be included in a hardcover sourcebook for Greyhawk. He received over five hundred letters in response. In the August 1988 issue of Dragon, he outlined the ideas from readers that had been included, and Greyhawk Adventures appeared shortly afterward as a response to requests from Greyhawk fans. The book's title was borrowed from Rose Estes's Greyhawk Adventures line of novels and used the same front-cover banner design. It was the thirteenth and final hardcover book published for the 1st edition Advanced Dungeons & Dragons rules.

The contents were designed to give Dungeon Masters ideas and play-opportunities unique to the Greyhawk world, including new monsters, magical spells and items, a variety of geographical features, profiles of prominent citizens, and the avatars of deities. In the time since Gygax had left TSR, no original Greyhawk material had been published, and many letter-writers had requested ideas for new adventures. Ward responded by including six plot-outlines that could be inserted into a Greyhawk campaign.

==== The City of Greyhawk boxed set ====
The publication of Greyhawk Adventures came just as TSR released the 2nd edition of Dungeons & Dragons. TSR released The City of Greyhawk boxed set in 1989 under the Greyhawk Adventures banner. Written by Carl Sargent and Rik Rose, this was not the city created by Gygax and Kuntz, but a new plan built from references made in previously published material.

This release remolded Gary Gygax's old Circle of Eight into a new plot-device. Instead of a group of eight companions based in the Obsidian Citadel who left periodically to fight evil, the Circle became eight wizards led by a ninth wizard, Gygax's former character Mordenkainen. In addition to Mordenkainen, seven of the wizards were previously existing characters from Gygax's original home game: Bigby, Otiluke, Drawmij, Tenser, Nystul, Otto, and Rary. The eighth was new: the female wizard Jallarzi Sallavarian. The Circle's mandate was to act as neutral referees between Good and Evil, never letting one side or the other gain the upper hand for long. In addition, Sargent and Rose took Gygax's original Obsidian Citadel, re-purposed it as Mordenkainen's castle, and placed it in an unspecified location in the Yatil Mountains.

The following year, in conjunction with this boxed set, TSR published a trilogy of World of Greyhawk Adventure (WGA) modules by Richard and Anne Brown - WGA1 Falcon's Revenge, WGA2 Falconmaster, and WGA3 Flames of the Falcon - set in the city, and centered on a mysterious villain called The Falcon. A fourth WGA module, WGA4 Vecna Lives! by David Cook, was published the same year, and featured the first appearance by Vecna, formerly a mythic lich in Dungeons & Dragons lore, now promoted to demigod-status.

==== Modules released under the Greyhawk Adventures banner ====
TSR also released five new World of Greyhawk (WG) adventures, which used the Greyhawk Adventures banner:

- WG8 Fate of Istus (Various authors, 1989)
- WG9 Gargoyle (Dave Collins & Skip Williams, 1989)
- WG10 Child's Play (Jean Rabe & Skip Williams, 1989)
- WG11 Puppets (Vince Garcia & Bruce Rabe, 1989)
- WG12 Vale of the Mage (Jean Rabe, 1989)

In 1990, TSR also published WGR1 Greyhawk Ruins, a module and sourcebook about Castle Greyhawk by TSR writers Blake Mobley and Timothy Brown. Although this was not the Castle Greyhawk of Gygax and Kuntz, it was the first serious attempt to publish details of the castle.

=== A new vision of the Flanaess (1991–1997) ===
Game designer Rick Swan noted the apparent lack of a central vision for Greyhawk material, describing the Greyhawk setting up to this point as "a crazy quilt, where odd-shaped scraps of material are randomly sewn together and everybody hopes for the best. How else to explain a setting that encompasses everything from the somber A1-4 Scourge of the Slave Lords adventure to the King Kong-inspired WG6 Isle of the Ape to the cornball humor of WG7 Castle Greyhawk? It makes for an interesting mess, but it's a mess nonetheless... The City of Greyhawk [is] the most credible attempt at smoothing out the rough spots".

In 1990, TSR decided that the decade-old world of Greyhawk needed to be refreshed. Rather than follow through with Gary Gygax's plan to develop new regions beyond the boundaries of the Flanaess, the decision was made to stay within the Flanaess and reinvigorate it by moving the campaign time line forward a decade, from 576 CY to 586 CY. The main story vehicle would be a war fomented by an evil half-demon named Iuz that involved the entire Flanaess, which would allow TSR to radically alter the pattern of regions, alliances, and rulers from Gygax's original setting.

==== The Greyhawk Wars ====
In order to move players from Gygax's familiar World of Greyhawk to their new vision, TSR planned a trilogy of modules that would familiarize players with events and conditions leading up to the coming war, and then take them through the war itself. Once players completed the war via the three modules, a new boxed set would be published to introduce the new storyline and the new Flanaess. Two World of Greyhawk Swords modules, WGS1 Five Shall Be One by Carl Sargent and WGS2 Howl from the North by Dale Henson, were released in 1991. These described events leading up to the war.

The third module was reworked into Greyhawk Wars, a strategy war game that led players through the events, strategies, and alliances of the actual war. A booklet included with the game, Greyhawk Wars Adventurer's Book, described the event of the war. In 582 CY (six years after Gygax's original setting of 576 CY), a regional conflict started by Iuz gradually widened until it was a war that affected almost every nation in the Flanaess. A peace treaty was signed in the city of Greyhawk two years later, which is why the conflict became known as the Greyhawk Wars. On the day of the treaty-signing, Rary—once a minor spellcaster created and then discarded by Brian Blume, but now elevated by TSR to the Circle of Eight—attacked his fellow Circle members, aided and abetted by Robilar. After the attack, Tenser and Otiluke were dead, while Robilar and Rary fled to the deserts of the Bright Lands. Rob Kuntz, original creator of Robilar, objected to this storyline, since he believed that Robilar would never attack his old adventuring companion Mordenkainen. Although Kuntz did not own the creative rights to Robilar and no longer worked at TSR, he unofficially suggested an alternate storyline that Robilar had been visiting another plane and in his absence, a clone or evil twin of Robilar was responsible for the attack.

==== From the Ashes ====
In 1992, after the two World of Greyhawk Swords prequel modules and the Greyhawk Wars game had been on the market for some months, TSR released the new Greyhawk setting, From the Ashes, a boxed set primarily written by Carl Sargent that described the Flanaess in the aftermath of the Greyhawk Wars. It contained a large 4-color hex map of the area around the city of Greyhawk; two full-color, 32"x21" fold-out poster maps of the continent (east and west), and 20 quick adventure cards, and two 96-page books.

The first book, Atlas of the Flanaess, was a replacement for Gygax's original World of Greyhawk boxed set, with some changes. Many human gods from previous editions were not included, although one new demigod, Mayaheine, was added. This had the net effect of reducing the total number of human deities from fifty to twenty-eight. Deities of other races were increased from twenty-four to thirty-eight, but unlike the full descriptions that were given to the human gods, these were simply listed by name. Like Gygax's original boxed set, each region was given a two to three hundred word description, although some details included in the older edition, such as trade goods, total population and racial mixes, were not included in this edition. A number of regions—Ahlissa, Almor, Medegia and South Province—no longer existed after the Wars or had been folded into other regions. One new region—the Olman Islands—was detailed. This had the net effect of reducing the total number of regions from sixty to fifty eight. Darlene's map of the Flanaess included in Gygax's setting was reproduced as an 11"x17" black-and-white map printed on the inside cover of the Atlas.

The second book, the Campaign Book, was designed to supplement, rather than replace, the four-year-old City of Greyhawk boxed set. It included updates to the city and its environs, and gave details of some new non-player characters and possible adventure hooks.

In Gygax's setting, the major conflict had been between the Great Kingdom and the lands that were trying to free themselves from the evil overking. In Sargent's world, the Great Kingdom storyline was largely replaced by the major new conflict between the land of Iuz and the regions that surrounded it. Southern lands outside of Iuz's were threatened by the mysterious and supremacist Scarlet Brotherhood, while other countries had been invaded by monsters or taken over by agents of evil. Overall, the vision was of a darker world where good folk were being swamped by a tide of evil.

Game designer Rick Swan concurred with this multi-step approach, writing that Greyhawk Wars "took another step in the right direction by shaking things up with a much-needed dose of epic conflict... veteran designer Carl Sargent has continued the overhaul with the ambitious From the Ashes. By combining heroic tradition with elements of dark fantasy, he's come up with a Greyhawk campaign that is both familiar and refreshingly unexpected".

Sargent tried to generate interest for this grimmer vision of the Flanaess by following up with an article in Dragon's March 1993 issue, writing, "...the powers of evil have waxed strong. The hand of Iuz, the Old One, extends across the central Flanaess, and the cruel Scarlet Brotherhood extends its power and influence around the southern lands bordering the Azure Sea. The World of Greyhawk setting has become a truly exciting world again..."

The boxed set was supported by the publication of two new source books in 1993, also written by Sargent. WGR4 The Marklands provided information about the good realms of Furyondy, Highfolk, and Nyrond that opposed Iuz, while WGR5 Iuz the Evil detailed information about the lands of Iuz, and emphasized the prominent new role that Iuz now played in the world order.

In addition, a number of adventures were also published, as much to provide more source material as for adventure:

- WGQ1 Patriots of Ulek was the first module published after From the Ashes, and advanced the storyline in Ulek, threatened by invasion from Turrosh Mak of the Pomarj.
- WGR2 Treasures of Greyhawk, by Jack Barker, Roy Rowe, Louis Prosperi, and Tom Prusa, was a loosely connected series of mini-adventures—for instance, exploring Bigby's home, travelling to the demiplane called The Great Maze of Zagyg, and trading riddles with a sphinx. Each mini-adventure focussed on a unique treasure in the Flanaess.
- WGR3 Rary the Traitor by Anthony Pryor was both an adventure module and a source book about the Bright Lands, the new home of Rary and Robilar following their murder of Tenser and Otiluke.
- WGR6 The City of Skulls, by Carl Sargent, and WGM1 Border Watch, by Paul T. Riegel, were modules highlighting the struggle between Furyondy and the lands of Iuz.

As Gygax had done ten years before, Sargent also used the pages of Dragon to promote his new world. He was working on a new source book, Ivid the Undying, and excerpted parts of it in the April, June and August 1994 issues.

==== TSR drops Greyhawk ====
In late 1994, TSR canceled Sargent's new book just as it was being readied for publication, and stopped work on all other Greyhawk projects. Nothing more about Greyhawk was ever published by TSR, with one exception: in May 1995, a Dragon column devoted to industry gossip noted that the manuscript of Ivid the Undying had been released by TSR as a computer text file. Using this file, several people have reconstructed the book as it might have appeared in published form.

By the end of 1996, TSR found itself heavily in debt and unable to pay its printers. Just as bankruptcy in 1997 seemed inevitable, Wizards of the Coast stepped in and, fueled by income from its collectible card game Magic: The Gathering, bought TSR and all its properties.

=== Wizards of the Coast (1998–2008) ===
After Wizards of the Coast (WotC) and TSR merged, the determination was made that TSR had created too many settings for the Dungeons & Dragons game, and several of them were eliminated. However, WotC's CEO, Peter Adkison, was a fan of both Dungeons & Dragons and Greyhawk, and two major initiatives were created: a revival of Greyhawk, and a new third edition of Dungeons & Dragons rules. A team of people was put together to revive the moribund Greyhawk setting by pulling together all the previously published information about it. Once that was done, the decision was made to update Carl Sargent's storyline, using similar prequel adventures to pave the way for the updated campaign setting.

First, Roger E. Moore created Return of the Eight in 1998. In the adventure, set in 586 CY, the same year as the From the Ashes boxed set, the players meet the surviving members of the Circle of Eight, which is called the Circle of Five because it is missing Tenser, Otiluke and Rary. If the players successfully finish the adventure, Tenser is rescued from death, though he refuses to rejoin the Circle, and the Circle is reconstituted as Eight with the addition of three new wizards: Alhamazad the Wise, Theodain Eriason and Warnes Starcoat.

Next, the Greyhawk Player's Guide, by Anne Brown, was released. This 64-page booklet moved the storyline ahead five years to 591 CY, and it mostly condensed and reiterated material that had been released in Gygax's and Sargent's boxed sets. New material included important non-player characters, a guide to roleplaying in the Flanaess, and some new sights. The list of deities was both shrunk and expanded; the thirty-eight non-human deities in the From the Ashes boxed set were eliminated and non-human concerns assigned to a handful of human deities, but the list of human deities was expanded from twenty-four to fifty-four.

With the groundwork for a new storyline prepared, TSR/WotC released the new campaign setting as a 128-page source book, Greyhawk: The Adventure Begins, by Roger E. Moore. Taking its lead from the Greyhawk Player's Guide, the new campaign world was set in 591 CY. Unlike the darker feel of From the Ashes, where the Flanaess was overrun by evil, Moore returned to Gygax's world of adventure.

Adjacent at the south of the Flanaess, the areas named the Tilvanot Peninsula, Amedio Jungle, and Hepmonaland were developed in The Scarlet Brotherhood supplement (1999), named after a supremacist organization of colonizers, which was detailed together with the indigenous Olman and Touv peoples.

The Lost Tombs trilogy of modules—The Star Cairns and Crypt of Lyzandred the Mad, by Sean K. Reynolds, and The Doomgrinder, by Steve Miller—were the first to be published in the new setting.

==== 25th anniversary of D&D ====
The year 1999 marked twenty-five years since the publication of the original Dungeons & Dragons rules, and WotC sought to lure older gamers back to Greyhawk by producing a series of nostalgia-tinged Return to... adventures that evoked the best-known Greyhawk modules from 20 years before, under the banner 25th Anniversary of D&D:

- Return to the Tomb of Horrors, by Bruce R. Cordell, reprinted Gary Gygax's S1 Tomb of Horrors, and added a substantial expansion.
- Return to the Keep on the Borderlands, by John D. Rateliff, took Gary Gygax's 1979 module, B2 Keep on the Borderlands and restocked it with fresh monsters, as if the twenty years that had passed since the original module's publication also equaled twenty years of game time. Although the original had been in a generic setting, the new adventure set the Keep in Greyhawk.
- Return to White Plume Mountain, by Bruce R. Cordell, likewise updated Lawrence Schick's twenty-year-old adventure, White Plume Mountain, by advancing the storyline twenty years.
- Against the Giants: The Liberation of Geoff, by Sean K. Reynolds, included the full text of Gygax's three original 1979 Giant modules and details of eighteen new adventure sites in Geoff, linked together as an integrated campaign.
- Slavers by Sean K. Reynolds and Chris Pramas, was a sequel to the original A1-4 Scourge of the Slavelords series, set ten years after the original adventures.
- Return to the Temple of Elemental Evil, by Monte Cook, returned the players to Gygax's infamous temple, which Rob Kuntz (as Robilar) had originally looted and wrecked. It was published in 2001, using the 3rd edition rules.

In conjunction with the publication of the Return to adventures, WotC also produced a series of companion novels known as the Greyhawk Classics series: Against the Giants, White Plume Mountain, Descent into the Depths of the Earth, Expedition to the Barrier Peaks, The Temple of Elemental Evil, Queen of the Demonweb Pits, Keep on the Borderlands, and The Tomb of Horrors.

In an attempt to attract players of other D&D settings, WotC released Die, Vecna, Die!, by Bruce R. Cordell and Steve Miller, a three-part adventure tying Greyhawk to the Ravenloft and Planescape campaign settings. Published in 2000, it was the last adventure to be written for D&D's 2nd edition rules.

==== Third edition (2000–2008) ====
In the editions of Dungeons & Dragons published by TSR, the setting of the game had not been specifically defined—Dungeon Masters were expected to either create a new world, or purchase a commercial campaign setting such as Greyhawk or Forgotten Realms. In 2000, after two years of work and playtesting, WotC released the 3rd edition of D&D, and defined a default setting for the game for the first time. Under third edition rules, unless a Dungeon Master specifically chose to use a different campaign setting, his or her D&D game would be set in the world of Greyhawk.

==== Living Greyhawk ====
Living Greyhawk Gazetteer (Wizards of the Coast, 2000), an updated sourcebook for the campaign setting.

With the release of the 3rd edition of Dungeons & Dragons, RPGA—the organized play division of WotC—announced a new massively shared living campaign, Living Greyhawk, modeled on a 2nd edition campaign called Living City. Although Living City was relatively successful, RPGA wanted to expand the scope of their new campaign—instead of one city as a setting, the new campaign would involve thirty different regions of Greyhawk, each specifically keyed to a particular country, state, or province of the real world. Each region would produce its own adventures, and in addition to these, RPGA would provide worldwide Core adventures. To provide the level of detail needed for such a venture, WotC published the Living Greyhawk Gazetteer, the most in-depth examination of the world of Greyhawk ever produced, and the official starting point for not only the campaign, but also for all home campaigns from that point forward.

Concurrent with the release of the 3rd edition Player's Handbook, Living Greyhawk debuted at Gen Con 2000 with three Core adventures: COR1-1 Dragon Scales at Morningtide, by Sean K. Reynolds; COR1-2 The Reckoning, by Sean Flaherty and John Richardson; and COR1-3 River Of Blood, by Erik Mona. WotC also released The Fright at Tristor by Keith Polster (2000), designed as an introductory adventure to the Living Greyhawk campaign world.

Unlike previous campaign settings, in which the calendar was frozen at a point chosen by the author, the Living Greyhawk calendar did advance one year in game time for every calendar year in real time: the campaign started in 591 CY (2001) and ended in 598 CY (2008), at which point over a thousand adventures had been produced for an audience of over ten thousand players. During this time, the campaign administrators incorporated most of WotC's new rules into the Greyhawk world, only excising material they felt would unbalance the campaign. In 2005, the administrators incorporated every deity ever mentioned in official Greyhawk material previous to the D&D 3rd edition, as well as all deities mentioned in the new 3rd edition source books. This tripled the number of deities in the campaign from about seventy to almost two hundred.

Despite the massive amount of world and storyline development, none of the Living Greyhawk storylines or changes to the setting were considered official, since the regional adventure modules were produced by volunteers; this material only received a cursory vetting by RPGA campaign administrators, and no review by WotC personnel.

==== Wizards of the Coast Greyhawk releases ====
Despite the popularity of the Living Greyhawk campaign, Wizards of the Coast did not produce much material for Greyhawk after the 25th anniversary Return to... series of adventures and the Living Greyhawk Gazetteer:

- The Standing Stone, written by John D. Rateliff (2001), had several minor references to the Greyhawk setting.
- Red Hand of Doom, written by James Jacob (2006), was not set in a specific campaign world, but did contain instructions for where to set the adventure within Greyhawk, Forgotten Realms, and Eberron.
- Expedition to the Ruins of Greyhawk by Erik Mona, James Jacobs, and Jason Bulmahn (2007), was an update to TSR's 1990 release WGR1 Greyhawk Ruins.

Otherwise, Wizards of the Coast left the development of the Greyhawk world to RPGA's Living Greyhawk campaign and concentrated on producing new source books of expansion material for the core rules of D&D.

=== Fourth and fifth edition of D&D (2008–present) ===
==== Fourth edition ====
At Gen Con 2007, WotC announced that the 4th edition of Dungeons & Dragons would be released the following spring, and Greyhawk would no longer be the default campaign setting under the new rules system. For this reason, Living Greyhawk was not converted to the new rules system; instead, it was brought to a conclusion at Origins 2008.

In 2009, WotC released The Village of Hommlet, by Andy Collins, which updated Gary Gygax's original 1st edition Village of Hommlet to the 4th edition rules for characters of 4th level. It was not available for purchase, but was sent as a reward for those who joined the RPGA. In March 2013 the adventure by Collins was reprinted in issue 212 of Dungeon, but now for characters of 3rd to 5th level.

==== Fifth edition ====
When the Player's Handbook for the fifth edition of Dungeons & Dragons was released in 2014, several references to the world of Greyhawk appeared throughout the descriptions of various races and classes, and a partial list of Greyhawk deities appeared in the book. The Monster Manual, the second released book of the 5th edition, did not include any direct references to Greyhawk but did mention Explictica Defilus from Against the Cult of the Reptile God in the Naga entry, and tied the creation of ghouls to Doresain, the "King of Ghouls", from the Greyhawk adventure Kingdom of the Ghouls by Wolfgang Baur from Dungeon #70.

In April 2017, Tales from the Yawning Portal was released. It contained seven older modules now reprinted and updated for the fifth edition of Dungeons & Dragons. Four out of the seven were old Greyhawk modules: Against the Giants, The Hidden Shrine of Tamoachan, Tomb of Horrors, and White Plume Mountain. In addition the book also featured advice how to place the other adventures within the Greyhawk setting, or how to change the name-giving tavern Yawning Portal in Waterdeep from the Forgotten Realms into the Green Dragon Inn from the City of Greyhawk. In May 2019, Ghosts of Saltmarsh was released for the fifth edition of Dungeons & Dragons. The book compiles new versions of classic adventures that are located around Saltmarsh in Greyhawk (The Sinister Secret of Saltmarsh, Danger at Dunwater, and The Final Enemy), or are generally naval themed.

In May 2024, it was announced that the updated Dungeon Master's Guide would feature Greyhawk as a sample campaign setting, and that prominent characters from the Greyhawk campaign setting would feature heavily in the art of all three updated core rulebooks. In December 2024, Wizards of the Coast announced Legends of Greyhawk as a new convention campaign which debuted at MagicCon: Chicago in February 2025. However, while this campaign is inspired by "past and current organized play campaigns", it uses separate rules from the standard D&D Adventurers League program. At Gen Con, in July 2025, they announced an expansion of Legends of Greyhawk as their "newest D&D organized play campaign" with various premier organizers assigned locations within the Greyhawk setting to create adventures for. Samantha Nelson of Polygon reported that it "will run at several other conventions this year before being made widely available for organized play in 2026". Nelson explained that players go from level one to three "after playing at least three adventures" and the "decisions players make in these early adventures will shape the future of the campaign, which is entering its beta phase. The campaign will grow and evolve based on the decisions players make at events worldwide, shaping the future of the campaign and the way that players experience the Grayhawk setting".

== Unofficial Greyhawk sources ==
Although TSR and WotC had each in turn owned the official rights to the World of Greyhawk since the first folio edition was published in 1980, the two people most responsible for its early development, Gary Gygax and Rob Kuntz, still had most of their original notes regarding the fifty levels of dungeons under Castle Greyhawk. Gygax also had his old maps of the city of Greyhawk, and still owned the rights to Gord the Rogue.

After Gygax left TSR in 1985, he continued to write a few more Gord the Rogue novels, which were published by New Infinities Productions: Sea of Death (1987), City of Hawks (1987), and Come Endless Darkness (1988). However, by this time, Gygax was furious with the new direction in which TSR was taking "his" world. In a literary declaration that his old world of Oerth was dead, and wanting to make a clean break with all things Greyhawk, Gygax destroyed his version of Oerth in the final Gord the Rogue novel, Dance of Demons. For the next fifteen years, he worked to develop other game systems.

But there was still the matter of the unpublished dungeons under Castle Greyhawk. Although Gygax had given glimpses into the dungeons in his magazine columns and articles, the dungeons themselves had never been released to the public. Likewise, Gygax's version of the city of Greyhawk had never been published, although Frank Mentzer believed the reason for that was because "the City of Greyhawk was a later development, originally being but a location (albeit a capital). As such it was never fleshed out all that thoroughly... notes on certain locations and notorious personnel, a sketch map of great brevity, and otherwise quite loose. That is doubtless why Gary didn't publish it; it had never been completed".

However, in 2003, Gygax announced that he was working with Rob Kuntz to publish the original castle and city in six volumes, although the project would use the rules for Castles and Crusades rather than Dungeons & Dragons. Since WotC still owned the rights to the name Greyhawk, Gygax changed the name of the castle to Castle Zagyg—the reverse homophone of his own name originally ascribed to the mad architect of his original thirteen level dungeon. Gygax also changed the name of the nearby city to "Yggsburgh", a play on his initials E.G.G.

This project proved to be much more work than Gygax and Kuntz had envisioned. By the time Gygax and Kuntz had stopped working on the original home campaign, the castle dungeons had encompassed fifty levels of maze-like passages and thousands of rooms and traps. This, plus plans for the city of Yggsburgh and encounter areas outside the castle and city, were found to be too much to fit into the proposed six volumes. Gygax decided he would recreate something like his original thirteen level dungeon, amalgamating the best of what could be gleaned from binders and boxes of old notes. Neither Gygax nor Kuntz had kept careful or comprehensive plans. Because they had often made up details of play sessions as they went, they usually just drew a quick map as they played, with cursory notes about monsters, treasures, and traps. These sketchy maps contained just enough detail so that the two could combine their independent efforts, after determining the merits of each piece. Recreating the city was also a challenge; although Gygax still had his old maps of the original city, all of his previously published work on the city was owned by WotC, so he would have to create most of the city from scratch while maintaining the look and feel of his original.

The slow and laborious process came to a complete halt in April 2004, when Gygax suffered a serious stroke. Although he returned to his keyboard after a seven-month convalescence, his output was reduced from fourteen-hour work days to only one or two hours per day. Kuntz had to withdraw due to other projects, although he continued to work on an adventure module that would be published at the same time as the first book. Under these circumstances, work on the Castle Zagyg project continued even more slowly, although Jeffrey Talanian stepped in to help Gygax. In 2005, Troll Lord Games published Volume I, Castle Zagyg: Yggsburgh. This 256-page hardcover book contained details of Gygax's original city, its personalities and politics, as well as over thirty encounters outside the city. The two part fold out map of the area was rendered by Darlene Pekul, the same artist who had produced the original map for the folio edition of World of Greyhawk. Later that year, Troll Lord Games also published Castle Zagyg: Dark Chateau, an adventure module written for the Yggsburgh setting by Rob Kuntz.

Book catalogs published in 2005 indicated several more volumes in the series would follow shortly, but it was not until 2008 that the second volume, Castle Zagyg: The Upper Works, appeared. The Upper Works described details of the castle above ground, acting as a teaser for the volumes concerning the actual dungeons that would follow. However, Gygax died in March 2008 before any further books were published. After his death, Gygax Games, under the control of Gary's widow Gail, took over the project, but no more volumes of the Castle Zagyg project have been published.

Rob Kuntz also published some of his creative work from the Castle Greyhawk dungeons. In 2008, he released the adventure modules The Living Room, about a whimsical but dangerous room that housed enormous furniture, and Bottle City, about a bottle found on the second level of the dungeon that contained an entire city. 2009 saw Kuntz release Daemonic & Arcane, a collection of Greyhawk and Kalibruhn magic items, and The Stalk, a wilderness adventure. By October 2010, Black Blade Publishing began to publish several of Kuntz's original Greyhawk levels, including the Machine Level, the Boreal Level, the Giants' Pool Hall, and the Garden of the Plantmaster.

== See also ==
- Greyhawk modules
