= The Doomgrinder =

Dungeons & Dragons adventure module

- Rules required: 2nd Ed AD&D
- Character levels: 4 - 8
- Campaign setting: Greyhawk
- Authors: Steve Miller
- First published: 1998

Linked modules
- The Star Cairns; Crypt of Lyzandred the Mad; The Doomgrinder

The Doomgrinder is an adventure module for the Dungeons & Dragons fantasy roleplaying game, set in the game's World of Greyhawk campaign setting.

== Plot summary ==
The Doomgrinder was published by TSR, Inc. in November 1998.

== Publication history ==
The module was published by Wizards of the Coast in 1998 under its recently acquired TSR imprint for the second edition Advanced Dungeons & Dragons rules. It is the final of the three adventures in the "Lost Tombs" series for the Greyhawk setting and is therefore a sequel to The Star Cairns and Crypt of Lyzandred the Mad.
