= Ravenloft: The Horrors Within =

Dungeons & Dragons fantasy role-playing game source book

- Rules required: Dungeons & Dragons 5.5 edition
- Lead designers: F. Wesley Schneider
- Authors: Jeremy Crawford, Makenzie De Armas, Ron Lundeen, Christopher Perkins, Ben Petrisor, Patrick Renie, Carl Sibley
- First published: June 16, 2026
- ISBN: 9780786970025

Ravenloft: The Horrors Within is a sourcebook that details the Domains of Dread from the Ravenloft campaign setting for the 5th edition of the Dungeons & Dragons fantasy role-playing game. It provides player options, rules for haunted bastions, ideas for the Dungeon Master on suspense and horror, a bestiary and an appendix on the tarokka deck (a variant of Tarot card reading).

== Contents ==
The Horrors Within details sixteen Domains of Dread, including the new cosmic horror domain Innsmouth; a bestiary with Ravenloft monstrosities, denizens and Darklords; and, various player options such as subclasses, species, and Dark Gifts.

== Publication history ==
In March 2026, Wizards of the Coast announced a new seasonal content format for Dungeons & Dragons with the "Season of Horror" scheduled to begin in June 2026. This season featured a return to the campaign setting of Ravenloft. It included the release of the 5.5 Edition sourcebook Ravenloft: The Horrors Within (2026) along with associated accessory products. Content from the sourcebook was previewed in the new actual play tie-in series titled Dungeon Masters (2026); corresponding "Play-Along Packs" were also released on D&D Beyond.

The Horrors Within had an early digital release for D&D Beyond Master Tier subscribers on June 2, 2026, followed by a wide release on June 16, 2026. F. Wesley Schneider is the sourcebook's lead designer. The standard edition featured cover art by Anna Podedworna and the alternate edition featured cover artwork by Pam Wishbow. Beadle & Grimm, a Wizards of the Coast licensee, released a special "Strahd's Silver Edition" which included physical props for the Dungeon Master to use such as handouts, maps, encounter cards and an amulet.

== Reception ==
A review for Screen Rant praised the options for players and the book's accessibility as the best in Ravenloft's publication history. It noted that every domain features an adventure and that the domain Innsmouth had been added and features Cthulhu. It criticized the resemblance of the adventures to similar content in Curse of Strahd, Van Richten's Guide to Ravenloft and Vecna: Eve of Ruin.

A review for Wargamer described the book as an "excellent" resource and praised the updated character options and the bastion rules roleplay opportunities. While it described the artwork as "absurdly gorgeous" it criticized the loss of background information compared to Van Richten's Guide to Ravenloft and the "lack of depth" in the adventures, as well as significant overlap with previous releases.

A review for Polygon praised the art quality and variation, new Domains of Dread and accessibility of the book but criticized it as partially redundant to Van Richten's Guide to Ravenloft.
