= Living Greyhawk =

Dungeons & Dragons living campaign

Living Greyhawk (LG) was a massively shared Dungeons & Dragons living campaign administered by RPGA that ran from 2000 to 2008. The campaign setting and storyline were based on Gary Gygax's World of Greyhawk setting, and used the Dungeons and Dragons Third Edition (later v3.5) rules. During the lifespan of the campaign, more than a thousand adventures were published, and these were played by tens of thousands of players around the world.

== Overview ==
In 1987, instead of presenting single Dungeons & Dragons adventures that were not linked to any previous or subsequent adventures, the official organized play association RPGA conceived of a long-term endeavor, called a living campaign, where the actions of the players would have an impact on the overall campaign story arc. The first campaign of this type was Living City, a series of adventures set in the city of Raven's Bluff, with the first module released in August 1987 at Gen Con. Living City proved to be a popular concept and "the number of Living City events actually surpassed the 'classic' RPGA tournaments — possibly as early as late 1993".

With the introduction of the third edition of Dungeons & Dragons in 2000, RPGA conceived of a new and improved campaign called Living Greyhawk that would be more far-reaching in scope and played on a larger, continental scale. Instead of one city and its environs, this campaign would cover 30 in-game regions of Oerth, each linked to a real-world area, as well as "core" in-game regions that were not assigned to any specific real-world area.

Living Greyhawk became the largest living campaign and was played by thousands of people around the world from 2000 to 2008. "Creighton Broadhurst, who was in charge of the core modules for the Living Greyhawk world," explained that if a Dungeon Master went "too far off the pre-written adventure, players might get confused in subsequent RPGA adventures". Additionally, RPGA modules were often written by people "within the RPGA community rather than being outside game designers. [...] RPGS writers must continually produce modules that will be used by the group. Adventures [were] released on a weekly basis". In 2026, academic Jukka Särkijärvi wrote that the campaign "produced in excess of 2,000 titles of adventure modules that are these days largely unavailable. Giving such a free hand with their intellectual property to groups of unpaid and unvetted fan writers with little supervision would be probably unthinkable today".

=== Publication history ===
The first introductory adventures of the campaign premiered at Gen Con in August 2000, and the Living Greyhawk Gazetteer, which contained background material, was published in November 2000. Volunteers were recruited to handle regional storylines, and regional play began in 2001.

At the end of 2001, campaign administrators changed the treasure rewards from a certificate-based system (a special item discovered during the adventure was given to one of the players as a certificate or "cert") to an equal-access system in which a special item could be purchased at the end of the adventure by any player and recorded on an adventure record ("AR"). This, and a rule change that immediately prohibited crafters of magic items from selling items to other players, caused some protest from players. However, in 2002, RPGA dropped its membership fee, and the number of players who had dropped out of the campaign was more than made up for by new RPGA members, and interest in Living Greyhawk increased substantially.

In 2003, the campaign was converted to the revised Dungeon and Dragon v3.5 rules.

In 2005, the campaign saw the first of several direct tie-ins to new rule expansion books published by Wizards of the Coast, with the launch of a new story arc set in the Bright Lands desert that coincided with the publication of Sandstorm.

In 2007 at Gen Con Indy, concurrent with the announcement that the 4th edition of Dungeons & Dragons would be published the following year, RPGA announced that the Living Greyhawk campaign would not be converted to 4th edition, but would instead be brought to a close.

The final adventures of the Living Greyhawk campaign premiered at the Origins convention in June 2008, and play ended on December 31, 2008. Särkijärvi explained that between 2000 and 2008 "RPGA's material production for the campaign exceeded the mother game's size tenfold". In comparison, between 1977 and 2000, the full catalogue of Advanced Dungeons & Dragons was 805 titles and during the same timeframe as Living Greyhawk, "Wizards of the Coast itself released a mere 206 titles for Dungeons & Dragons". He noted that the RPGA did not attempt "to preserve the library of scenarios or make them available to future gamers".

== Design of the campaign ==
RPGA already knew from their experience with Living City that an adventure in a shared campaign had to be run the same way by every Dungeon Master (DM), to be equitable for all players. This created problems with some of the rules, which could be adjudicated several different ways according to circumstance. There was also the problem of certain character classes and items that could unbalance the campaign by providing one character with too much power.

To try to avoid these problems, Living Greyhawk used Dungeons & Dragons Third Edition (later v3.5), but modified by a set of "house rules" set out in the Living Greyhawk Campaign Sourcebook. Some of these house rules included:

- Limits on starting character classes and races All new characters were required to start at 1st level. Originally only races and character classes found in the Players Handbook were allowed. This was later modified to include some new character classes such as favoured soul and hexblade. Occasionally access to new races was granted under particular circumstances. For example, if a player chose to play the first adventure of the "Bright Sands" story arc, centaur could be chosen as a race. In another instance, a special card issued by RPGA allowed the player holding the card to create a kobold character.
- Limits on levels gained. Although D&D 3.0/3.5 was designed for characters up to 20th level, LG required characters to retire from the campaign when they reached 18th level. (This was later modified to require retirement when 16th level was reached.)
- No evil Characters could not have an evil alignment, nor could they worship an evil deity. If a character committed an evil act, such as attacking another player character, the DM was required to report this to the local Triad. If the Triad decided this act indicated a change of character alignment to evil, then the character would be permanently removed from the campaign. For this reason, any character infected by lycanthropy was given a chance to remove the curse, but if unsuccessful, was removed from the campaign.
- One play opportunity only. Players were only allowed to play each adventure once. If a person had already run the adventure as a DM before playing it, then he or she was barred from playing the adventure afterward. (This was called "eating a module".)
- Certain things banned from LG. To try to maintain some balance between the characters and adventure encounters, and also some fairness in the powers and abilities of the characters, some character classes, prestige classes, magic items, weapons and spells were banned from play. Additionally only new items, spells and powers found in books published by Wizards of the Coast were allowed in the campaign.
- The use of Time Units to regulate number of adventures played per year See Time Units below.
- Campaign documentation. In addition to the standard character sheet used in Dungeons & Dragons, every player was required to keep complete campaign documentation for each character. Living Greyhawk was sometimes derisively called "Living Accounting", since the list of documents could include
  - an Adventure Record (AR) for each adventure played by the character, which tracked accumulated gold pieces, experience points and Time Units spent, as well as access to magic items and spells, and any favours or curses gained during the adventure;
  - a Master Item Logsheet (MIL), which described when each special or magical item had been bought or created by the character.
  - a Magic Item Creation sheet (MIC), which logged magic items created by the character
  - any campaign documentation or certificates earned during adventures
- Character Death If a character died and the player was unable or unwilling to pay for resurrection during or immediately following the adventure, the character was removed from the campaign. A dead character could not be resurrected or otherwise brought back to the campaign at a later date.

The various adventures themselves were loosely tied together and storylines were developed based on general successes or failures from previous adventures. To enable the Circle to monitor this, at the conclusion of some adventures, the DM was required to submit the results to the Circle (campaign administrators), which then planned future plotlines based on these results. This interactivity was what inspired the word "Living" in the title of this type of shared campaign.

=== Administration ===
The campaign was overseen by the Circle, a group of six RPGA staff. Five of the members had individual oversight for one of the five metaregions; the sixth Circle member had responsibility for Core adventures. The responsibilities of the Circle included approval of all adventures that rewarded treasure, coordination of overall campaign and metaregional story arcs, approving story ideas for Core and metaregional adventures and editing same, producing campaign documentation and rules, ruling on reports of cheaters and unsportsmanlike conduct, and appointing and maintaining a Triad for each region.

Due to the workload, some metaregions also added a metaregional coordinator volunteer to assist with metaregional storylines and adventures.

Each region was overseen by its Triad, who reported to their respective Circle member. The Triad was responsible for finding writers for regional adventures (or writing the regional adventures themselves), approving story ideas, editing adventures and submitting finished adventures to the Circle for approval, writing special missions for individual players, answering questions from players, arbitrating disputes regarding play, auditing players' documents, and maintaining a regional website.

=== Regionality of campaign ===
The Living Greyhawk campaign differed from previous shared-world campaigns in one important respect: thirty of the regions from World of Greyhawk were linked to real-world areas; volunteers from these real-world locations then assumed responsibility for the storyline and administration of that particular region. In return, the real-world location was the only place where one could play adventures belonging to that region. Any adventures set outside these thirty regions were "core" adventures that could be played by anyone anywhere.

To present story arcs with larger themes than the local concerns presented in regional adventures, the Circle gathered the thirty regions into five larger metaregions. This provided a level of storyline that fell between the strictly local interests of regional adventures and the continent-wide story arcs of "core" adventures.

== Adventures types ==
Given the "regionality" of the campaign, the Living Greyhawk campaign produced five categories of role-playing adventures:

- Regional adventures
- Metaregional adventures
- Core adventures
- Adapted adventures
- Adaptable adventures.

=== Regional ===
These were produced by the regional Triad and approved by the corresponding Circle member. The adventures could only be played within the borders of the corresponding real world Region, although players from other Regions could, while visiting the Region, play them at double the cost of Time Units.

- Regional introductory adventures were similar to regional adventures but were designed to be played by 1st-level characters only (and in some cases, only by completely new characters). No treasure could be gained from these adventures, and Circle approval was not required.
- Special missions were one-time adventures written by the Triad (or a Triad-appointed writer) for a specific character to resolve a character plotline that could not be resolved through a regular adventure e.g. getting married, fulfilling the requirements for a prestige class, etc. No treasure could be gained through these, and Circle approval was not required.
- Regional interactive adventures were one-time adventures written for play at a single convention. These were often used to reveal important developments in the regional storyline (e.g. assassination of an important NPC, results of an election, etc.), or to develop regional flavour e.g. a cultural festival with characteristics unique to the region. Players often dressed up as or physically role-played their character in a style similar to a LARP.

=== Metaregional ===
These adventures had to be played within the borders of the corresponding real world Metaregion and dealt with events set within that portion of the World of Greyhawk corresponding to the Metaregion. Production of Metaregional adventures was overseen by the Circle member or Metaregional Coordinator.

=== Core ===
Core adventures dealt with events in regions that had not been assigned to a real-world counterpart. This included the Free City of Greyhawk, the Amedio Jungle and the Northern Wastes, among others. Because these regions did not belong to a real world area, they could be played by players living anywhere in the real world. Production of Core adventures was overseen by the Circle member with special responsibility for the Core regions.

- Core special adventures were generally played only at large conventions, and generally took the form of a "dungeon crawl", where most of the adventure was taken up by battles with little or no roleplaying element. Some core special adventures were made available to only eight conventions worldwide, while others were run at a selection of big conventions but then reissued (possibly in a rewritten format) for home play.

The table below is a list of Core regions that have been used in core modules.

Abyss	Amedio Jungle	Archclaricy of Veluna	City of Brass	Domain of Greyhawk	Duchy of Urnst
Frost Barbarians	Great Kingdom of Northern Aerdy	Hellfurnaces	Hepmonaland	Hold of the Sea Princes	Kingdom of Schnai
Northern Wastes	Nyr Dyv	Occupied Land of Iuz	Olman Islands	Orcish Empire of the Pomarj	Ratik
Slerotin's Passage	Solnor Compact	Sterich	The Bright Lands	The Former Duchy of Tenh	The Theocracy of Pale
Wild Coast	Valley of the Mage	Vault of the Drow

=== Adapted ===
Some commercially produced adventures published by Wizards of the Coast (such as Red Hand of Doom) were selected by the Circle and adapted for play in Living Greyhawk. These adventures counted as Core adventures, although they had not been published by the Circle.

=== Adaptable ===
Only produced in the first two years of the campaign, these adventures were published by the Circle and sent to each regional Triad, which could then modify aspects of the adventure to fit the story arc and characteristics of their region.

== Time units ==
At the start of each calendar year, each character in the campaign started with 52 time units (TUs). Most regional adventures cost 1 TU to play (double if the character was visiting from another region), and most Core adventures cost 2 TUs. TUs could also be spent for out-of-adventure reasons such as crafting a magical item or being a member of an organization or a guild. Once a character spent 52 TUs, that character could no longer be played until the start of the following calendar year. This was ameliorated by the fact that each player could have as many characters in play at the same time as desired. Once one character had run out of TUs, the player could simply switch to playing another character until the start of the new year reset TUs back to 52. Regions were allocated a limited number of scenarios per year and each "scenario had a life cycle of roughly two years, after which they were retired from play". Additionally, "a year of real time corresponded to a year in the setting of Greyhawk". Särkijärvi explained that the limited time availability for adventures "heightened the sense of time passing in the world of Greyhawk. Storylines of multiple scenarios began, advanced, ended, and then passed into memory".

While 1 TU was ostensibly equal to one week of game time, in fact this was simply an arbitrary number designed to limit how many adventures one character could play in a calendar year, and therefore restrict how much wealth and power a single character could accumulate in a single year.

After the end of the campaign was announced in August 2007, the rules concerning TUs were relaxed. From November 1, 2007 until the end of the campaign, adventures no longer cost any TUs (although "in-game" activities such as crafting magic items still had a TU cost). The effect was to allow each character an unrestricted amount of play to reach 16th level and "retire" by the end of the campaign.

== Living Greyhawk regions ==
One of the main differences between Living Greyhawk and previous shared-world campaigns was regionality: thirty regions of the campaign world were linked to thirty real-world locations. These real-world locations were then given responsibility for developing the storylines and adventures for the campaign region. In return, the campaign region became the "property" of its real-world "owner"—only players who were physically in the real-world location could play the adventures of that location's campaign region.

For example, Onnwal was assigned to the United Kingdom, Sunndi to the Benelux countries, and Ekbir to France. A player sitting at a table in Manchester, England could play an Onnwal adventure, but could not play an adventure set in Ekbir or Sunndi, since those adventures could only be played in France and Benelux respectively. However, if that player travelled to France or Benelux, the player could play Ekbir or Sunndi adventures respectively.

The only exception to this rule was made at large conventions such as Gen Con, when a late-night world-wide "Fiesta" play opportunity was granted to DMs from any region of the world so they could present an adventure from their home region.

In 2007, to recognize the growth of the internet and an abundance of cheap long-distance telephone rates, the physical location rule was relaxed somewhat: as long as the DM and more than 50% of the players were physically together, other players who lived in that region but were currently travelling out of region could teleconference into the game.

When creating a character, the player had to choose a "home region" for it, which could be any one of the thirty regions linked to a real-world location. However to promote an esprit de corps within each region, Living Greyhawk rules made it more costly in terms of Time Units for a character to participate in adventures outside of its "home region".

For instance, nothing in the rules prevented a player living in France from making the character's home region Sunndi (belonging to Benelux) rather than Ekbir (belonging to France). However, any time the player used that character to play Ekbir adventures in France, it cost the Sunndi character double the number of Time Units, since the character was effectively playing out of region. If done regularly, this would halve the number of adventures this character could play each year. For this reason, most players simply made their characters' home region the region that they physically lived in.

The thirty regions linked to real-world locations were in turn grouped into one of five metaregions. The table below shows the real-world areas that were linked to each region, grouped by metaregion. Any region not listed below—such as the Free City of Greyhawk, the Duchy of Tenh or the Amedio Jungle—was a "Core" region, and could not be used by characters as a home region.

Greyhawk region	Real world location(s)
The Sheldomar Valley
Bissel	Connecticut, Maine, Massachusetts, New Hampshire, Rhode Island, Vermont
Geoff	Delaware, District of Columbia, Maryland, Virginia, West Virginia, and any area of the world not otherwise assigned a region.
Gran March	Georgia, North Carolina, South Carolina
Keoland	New Jersey, New York, Pennsylvania
Principality of Ulek	Florida and Puerto Rico
Yeomanry	Alabama, Arkansas, Kentucky, Louisiana, Mississippi, Tennessee
Velverdyva, Tuflik & Fals (VTF) Trade Route
City of Dyvers	Iowa, Kansas, Missouri, Nebraska
Ekbir	France
Ket	Ontario, Manitoba, New Brunswick, Nova Scotia, Prince Edward Island, Newfoundland and Labrador
Tusmit	Quebec
Veluna	Ohio
Verbobonc	Illinois, Indiana
Zeif	Alberta, British Columbia, Northwest Territories, Nunavut, Saskatchewan, Yukon
Iuz's Border States
Bandit Kingdoms	Texas, Oklahoma
Furyondy	Michigan
Highfolk	Wisconsin
Perrenland	Start of campaign until October 2006: Australia, New Zealand October 2006 until end of campaign: South Australia, Western Australia, Northern Territory, Queensland, North Island, Hong Kong, Malaysia, Singapore, South Korea, Guam
Shield Lands	Minnesota, North Dakota, South Dakota
Nyrond and Her Environs
County of Urnst	Colorado, Montana, New Mexico, Wyoming
Duchy of Urnst	Alaska, Idaho, Oregon, Washington
Nyrond	Arizona, Hawaii (February 2004 – October 5, 2006), Southern California, Utah
Pale	Northern California, Nevada
Ratik	Start of campaign until Feb 2004: Hawaii Feb 2004 – October 2006: inactive (treated as Core region); October 2006 – December 2008: Hawaii, Japan, New South Wales, Victoria, ACT, Tasmania, South Island
Splintered Suns
Ahlissa (Adri/Innspa)	Germany, Austria
Ahlissa (Naerie)	Norway, Denmark, Finland, Sweden
Bone March	Greece
Lordship of the Isles	Spain
Onnwal	United Kingdom, Ireland
Sea Barons	Italy
Sunndi	Belgium, Netherlands, Luxembourg
Dullstrand	Start of campaign until 2003: South Africa 2003 until end of campaign: Switzerland

== See also ==
- Living Greyhawk Gazetteer
