= Dungeons & Dragons organized play =

Tabletop role-playing game association

The Dungeons & Dragons (D&D) fantasy role-playing game has had multiple official organized play associations and programs. The first association, Role Playing Game Association Network (RPGA Network, or simply RPGA), was launched by D&D's previous publisher, TSR, Inc., in 1980. In 2014, the current D&D publisher Wizards of the Coast rebranded the association as D&D Adventurers League (or simply Adventurers League for short). This rebranding corresponded with the launch of D&D's 5th Edition. In the 2020s, Wizards of the Coast released additional D&D organized play programs such as Legends of Greyhawk and Dungeons & Dragons Play Seasons.

The RPGA initially focused on a tournament style of play with competitive events for TSR games such as Advanced Dungeons & Dragons (AD&D), Gamma World and Top Secret. In 1987, the RPGA launched its first living campaign where players at many locations could impact the storyline via their reported actions in campaign adventures. Various living campaigns were released for the different games administered by the RPGA. The Living City (1987–2004) campaign set in the Forgotten Realms was considered one of the most successful and by 1993, events for it surpassed the RPGA tournament style. Coinciding with the release of D&D's 3rd Edition in 2000, the first edition published by Wizards of the Coast, the RPGA launched Living Greyhawk which became one of the largest campaigns and ran until 2008.

In 2010, during the D&D's 4th Edition era, the RPGA introduced the D&D Encounters program which was intended as the D&D equivalent of Wizards of the Coast's Friday Night Magic program. This program ran alongside the Living Forgotten Realms (2008–2014) campaign. In 2014, the Adventurers League divided organized play between the D&D Encounters and the D&D Expeditions programs for D&D's 5th Edition. In 2016, these programs were retired. The Adventurers League has since released various other organized play programs themed around different campaign settings and ongoing storylines. Many of these programs featured seasonal storylines which corresponded thematically with the hardcover adventure modules published by Wizards of the Coast. Additionally, the design of both the D&D Expeditions program and the Masters Campaign program were influenced by the living campaigns style of play.

In 2024, Wizards of the Coast launched Legends of Greyhawk as their new organized play campaign with separate rules from the standard Adventurers League program. Legends of Greyhawk started as a convention play format but was announced as the official secondary play program for Wizards Play Network (WPN) stores in April 2026. That month, Wizards of the Coast also announced Dungeons & Dragons Play Seasons for organized play at WPN stores which correspond with Dungeons & Dragons seasonal releases as well as the return of D&D Encounters as part of seasonal play. These programs run alongside but separately from Adventurers League.

== RPGA Network (1980–2014) ==
Role Playing Game Association
- Abbreviation: RPGA
- Successor: D&D Adventurers League
- Established: 1980; 46 years ago
- Founder: Frank Mentzer
- Dissolved: 2014; 12 years ago
- Type: Role-playing games, Dungeons & Dragons
- Parent organization: Wizards of the Coast
- Website: wizards.com/rpga (archive of 3.5 Edition website) wizards.com/dnd/Events (archive of 4th Edition website)

In 1979, Mike Carr, the general manager of TSR, Inc., the original publishers of the Dungeons & Dragons game, conceived the idea of a role-playing gamers club. Shortly after Frank Mentzer was hired in 1980 as one of the first full-time employees of TSR, Inc., he was assigned the task making a role-playing gamers club a commercial reality, which was officially called the Role Playing Game Association (RPGA) in order to promote roleplaying of high quality and to allow fans of roleplaying games to meet and play games with each other. Mentzer officially launched the RPGA in November 1980 primarily to run tournaments at gaming conventions using TSR's top sellers: AD&D, Gamma World and Top Secret. In 1991, the RPGA ran 179 of these events.

At each tournament, a Dungeon Master and four to eight players would play a 4-hour adventure supplied by the RPGA. Each player was given a pre-generated character with a background, equipment, and some limited information about the other characters at the table. At the end of the adventure, the players and Dungeon Master would select one player at the table as the "winner" of the adventure, based on his or her knowledge of the rules and role-playing ability. All players were awarded experience points based on how well they did in competitive events, and could add to that experience point total at the next event, allowing them, over time to advance to higher levels.

Membership was originally paid by a yearly fee, and included a subscription to Polyhedron magazine (which was originally the official publication of the RPGA). In the early years, membership was largely limited to North America, but in 1989, the RPGA Network branched out into Norway, Sweden, Denmark, the U.K., Israel, Australia, and briefly in Italy.

=== Living campaign ===
In 1987, instead of presenting single adventures that were not linked to any previous or subsequent adventures, RPGA conceived of a long-term endeavor, called a living campaign, where the actions of the players would have an impact on the overall campaign story arc. The first campaign of this type was Living City, a series of adventures set in the city of Raven's Bluff.

The first "Living City" module was "Caravan" released in August 1987 at Gen Con.

Unlike previous RPGA tournament play, where players were given a pre-generated character, Living City adventures required each player to provide their own character. Previously, experience points had been accumulated by the player, but now experience points were accumulated by the player's character. Bringing the same character back to subsequent adventures allowed that character to accumulate more experience points and greater powers.

To have an effect on the overall storyline, at the end of each adventure, the players would send the result of their play to RPGA headquarters for compilation. Success or failure by a majority of players would result in a change to the campaign storyline. For example, if most players in a particular adventure succeeded in lifting a curse, the curse would not appear in future adventures. "The RPGA set the template for MMORPGs; adventurers existing in the same world in a sort of mega-universe".

Living City proved to be a popular concept and "the number of Living City events actually surpassed the 'classic' RPGA tournaments — possibly as early as late 1993". In the first decade of the twenty-first century, RPGA created a variety of living campaigns. The largest was Living Greyhawk, played by thousands of people around the world from 2000 to 2008. At this point, RPGA had members on all continents of the world except Antarctica. "Creighton Broadhurst, who was in charge of the core modules for the Living Greyhawk world, explains that if a DM ventures too far off the pre-written adventure, players might get confused in subsequent RPGA adventures [...]. Writers for RPGA modules often come from within the RPGA community rather than being outside game designers. [...] RPGS writers must continually produce modules that will be used by the group. Adventures [were] released on a weekly basis".

In 2002, RPGA membership became free, but the subscription to Polyhedron was no longer included as a membership benefit because the magazine had been bought by Paizo Publishing, who then published it as a section of Dungeon.

=== 4th Edition and launch of D&D Encounters ===
In 2008, Wizards of the Coast launched the Living Forgotten Realms at Gen Con 2008; this living campaign utilized the new 4th Edition rules and replaced the 3.5 Edition Living Greyhawk campaign in organized play. The campaign ran until 2014 with its finale at Winter Fantasy 2014.

In 2010, Wizards of the Coast launched a new organized play initiative called D&D Encounters at stores in the Wizards Play Network as a D&D equivalent of Friday Night Magic. The company "supplied GMs across the nation with adventures to run on Wednesday nights. [...] Each night's adventuring contained just a single encounter. These sessions were billed as running 60-90 minutes in length". Shannon Appelcline, author of Designers & Dragons, wrote, "by running Encounters simultaneously across the nation, Wizards hoped to take advantage of social media; they envisioned people talking about the games on Facebook and Twitter on Wednesday night and Thursday morning, comparing their experiences with those of other players across the nation. [...] Overall, the Encounters program would prove extremely successful. Though neither it nor Essentials made D&D Fourth Edition into an unprecedented success story, the Encounters program was well-loved; it got attention on CNN and elsewhere and was successful at drawing players into game stores to play. Eleven Encounters seasons ran through late 2012, before the program took a short break and shifted over to a mixed 4e and D&D Next format in 2013". The transition between editions of Dungeons & Dragons was called The Sundering and it included multiple structural changes to the D&D Encounters program.

== D&D Adventurers League (2014–present) ==
D&D Adventurers League
- Abbreviation: D&D AL
- Predecessor: RPGA
- Established: 2014; 12 years ago
- Type: Dungeons and Dragons 5th Edition
- Parent organization: Wizards of the Coast
- Awards: 2018 ENnie Awards; Best Organized Play - Gold Winner; 2019 ENnie Awards; Best Organized Play - Silver Winner
- Website: dndbeyond.com/tag/adventurers-league (Official hub on D&D Beyond) yawningportal.dnd.wizards.com (Jan. 2024 archive of second website) dndadventurersleague.org (Oct. 2020 archive of first website)

In 2014, Wizards of the Coast rebranded their D&D organized play program – this included changing the name to the D&D Adventurers League. The inception of this rebrand coincided with the launch of 5th Edition. Initially, the in-store organized play program was divided between D&D Encounters and D&D Expeditions. This organizational division was retired in 2016. The D&D Adventurers League has since reorganized its play program by various new campaign formats and campaign settings. As of February 2024, there are three Premier Organizers for the Adventurers League – Baldman Games and Gamehole Con in the United States and the Greasy Snitches in the Philippines. These licensees are granted sections of the Forgotten Realms campaign setting to release their own official adventures in for the Adventurers League.

In March 2020, due to the COVID-19 pandemic, Wizards suspended in-store events in North America, Europe, and Latin America. In October 2020, Wizards announced the ticketed D&D Virtual Play Weekends series organized by Baldman Games. This monthly event uses a convention style format and includes the option of either Adventurers League legal games or non-AL games. In September 2022, Wizards mistakenly announced via a newsletter their intention to remove individual adventure listings on the Dungeon Masters Guild and switch to an Adventurers League bundle system starting in January 2023. However, following a negative community reaction, this decision was rescinded.

Wizards announced a series of events to celebrate the 50th anniversary of D&D throughout 2024. This included an official weekly actual play titled Legacy of Worlds which is produced by the D&D Adventurers League and Six Sides of Gaming. It premiered in February 2024 and features Devin Wilson as the Dungeon Master with Luke Gygax, Ed Greenwood, Keith Baker, Elise Von Brandthofen, and Tommy Gofton playing as various official D&D characters. In March 2024, Gary Con featured a live show for the Legacy of Worlds; the show will then resume its weekly format until October 2024 with its finale at Gamehole Con. In the same month, Wizards shifted anyway from the official Adventurers League website, the Yawning Portal, to a hub hosted on D&D Beyond with some material migrating.

In April 2026, Wizards announced the addition of other organized play formats, such as Legends of Greyhawk and the return of D&D Encounters. Wizards described Adventurers League as the "legacy ongoing campaign". They stated Adventurers League would continue to be an official WPN event type that can use community-created adventures and other "material going back to the beginning of fifth edition". On the differences between Adventurers League and Legends of Greyhawk, Wizards's D&D global play manager Chris Tulach explained that the new program is designed "around 5.5e rules", optimized for D&D Beyond, and features adventures only from organizer partners unlike Adventurers League which "is 5e-forward" and features content "created by the community through DM's Guild".

=== Campaigns ===
Similar to the 4th Edition program, D&D Encounters continued to be run on Wednesdays. Participating stores had access to a "digital edition of an existing for-sale adventure product for the entirety of the storyline season". D&D Encounters was focused on low-level play with short sessions; once a group finished the adventure, they had the option to migrate their campaign to the corresponding hardback adventure module or to a D&D Expeditions adventure. The D&D Expeditions program was envisioned as the living campaign successor; initially, the program was going to be called Living Moonsea as the story was set in the Moonsea region of the Forgotten Realms. D&D Expeditions were designed to have longer sessions and show the regional impact of the current season's storyline. Additionally, there was a convention program called the D&D Adventurers League Epic; this was a "massive D&D session in which multiple tables work towards the same goals".

In 2016, with the 4th season of organized play, Wizards of the Coast retired the D&D Encounters & D&D Expeditions programs when they opened the D&D Adventurers League up to any organizer, rather than just limiting it to participating stores. Adventures were now available for purchase via the Dungeon Masters Guild and groups could play online or in private non-store groups. Additionally, licensee Baldman Games was authorized to create connected adventures set in the Moonsea region of the Forgotten Realms. A non-seasonal "exploratory campaign featuring Eberron", titled Embers of the Last War, was run from September 2018 to December 2018. Then in December 2019, the Oracle of War – a separate ongoing storyline set in Eberron – began. In January 2020, the Dreams of the Red Wizards storyline was introduced which included adventures released in 2019; this was a non-seasonal storyline set in the Forgotten Realms which focused on higher-level play opportunities (Tiers 2–4).

Until 2020, the seasons of organized play continued to correspond to the most recent published hardcover adventure module with additional thematic adventures released just for Adventurers League. In September 2020, with the 10th season of organized play, the D&D Adventurers League divided organized play into four new categories: Seasonal Campaign, Historic Campaign, Masters Campaign, Alternate Campaign. The Seasonal Campaign featured the most recent published hardcover adventure module along with adventures published on the Dungeon Masters Guild which correspond to the storyline. The Historic Campaign featured the back catalog of previous seasons. The Masters Campaign was "structured like a lot of 'living' campaigns in the past" with "an ongoing narrative that is broken into story seasons, all set in the Forgotten Realms". The ongoing Dreams of the Red Wizards storyline became a Masters Campaign. The Alternate Campaign was initially focused on Oracle of War which ran until 2022. In 2021, a second Alternate Campaign was launched – the Ravenloft: Mist Hunters storyline which ran until March 2022.

In September 2021, with the 11th season of organized play, the categories were restructured again. Campaigns were divided into Expansion Campaigns, Event Campaigns, and Adapted Campaigns. Expansion Campaigns feature "a set series of adventures in a connected storyline"; the original Seasonal and Alternate Campaigns were moved to this category. Event Campaigns feature "completely independent storylines from official D&D products" and are the analog to the previous living campaigns. The ongoing Dreams of the Red Wizards is now considered an Event Campaign. Adapted Campaigns are any official D&D product, such as hardcover adventure modules, with the corresponding Adventurers League rules guide. In March 2022, Baldman Games began running a ticketed Adapted Campaign featuring Critical Role: Call of the Netherdeep (2022) as part of the D&D Virtual Play series.

As part of the D&D 50th anniversary celebration in 2024, the Adventurers League Epic Proxy Hunt premiered at Gary Con (March 2024). This is a higher tier multiverse-themed adventure run at multiple gaming tables simultaneously and allows players to use characters from the Dragonlance, Eberron, Forgotten Realms, and Ravenloft settings. Afterwards, was scheduled to be released on the DMs Guild with alternative rules for running the Epic at a single table. Wizards also announced a series of in-store organized play events. The first, Descent into the Lost Caverns of Tsojcanth (March 29, 2024 to April 29, 2024), features a standard mode and a tournament mode; the tournament mode is competitive and "a throwback to old D&D convention tournaments that revolved around the DM using a scoring checklist to track what the group did throughout the game session".

=== Rules ===
The D&D Adventurers League requires both players and Dungeon Masters to keep official logs of their play experience and it includes an additional ruleset for play in order to facilitate the ability to "drop in or out on a session by session basis". This includes unique rules on experience points, magic items and gold. In 2018, "the admins of the Adventurers League announced a sweeping overhaul of the rules, designed to change how players earn XP and treasure". Several magic items were removed from the game, and players now gained "advancement checkpoints" and "treasure points" which they could trade for level advancement and magic items respectively. In 2019, with the 9th season of Adventurers League, these checkpoint rules were replaced with new character advancement and magic item rules and then adjusted in 2020 with the 10th season of Adventurers League.

This unique ruleset also governs character creation. Initially, players were limited to the character creation rules in the Player's Handbook (2014) along with a single other "officially allowed book of their choice". "This was done to allow DMs to ensure their games were balanced and avoid abuse of multiple rulesets". In 2021, the rules for character creation changed to allow players to use any of the following sourcebooks: Player's Handbook (2014), Volo's Guide to Monsters (2016), Xanathar's Guide to Everything (2017), Mordenkainen's Tome of Foes (2018), and Tasha's Cauldron of Everything (2020). Additionally, "setting-specific AL campaigns [...] have access to books created for those campaigns like Sword Coast Adventurer's Guide or Eberron: Rising from the Last War. Each Seasonal campaign will [...] allow the use of character options from the campaigns' associated hardcover book". In September 2021, character creation rules for adventures set in the Forgotten Realms were adjusted after community feedback. Changes included the option to start at a higher level and the ability to use any treasure of a monetary value during a session with unused treasure converted to its gold value at the end of a session.

In May 2022, the Adventurers League announced that all player characters must be updated to the new ruleset published in Mordenkainen Presents: Monsters of the Multiverse (2022); this supplement replaces the player options included in Volo's Guide to Monsters and Mordenkainen's Tome of Foes supplements. Dungeon masters have the option to use creature stat blocks included in older playable content; however, starting in September 2022, new published content will use the adjusted stat blocks released in Monsters of the Multiverse. Subsequent iterations of the Adventurers League Player's Guide were updated to include additional sourcebooks, such as Fizban's Treasury of Dragons (2021), Bigby Presents: Glory of Giants (2023), Book of Many Things (2024), as player options. Additionally, the 13th version of the Player's Guide (December 2022) added Dragonlance: Shadow of the Dragon Queen (2022) to Dragonlance campaigns; the 14th version of the Player's Guide (March 2024) added Planescape: Adventures in the Multiverse (2023) to Planescape campaigns and Tal'Dorei Reborn (2022) to Critical Role campaigns.

In September 2024, it was announced that the Adventurers League would replace the three 2014 core rulebooks with the 2024 revised core rulebooks following the staggered release of these new rulebooks. Any rules option updated in the 2024 rulebooks takes precedence over previously published rules, however, any rules option which has not yet been updated can still be used as long as it is "the most recently published version of that option". All players are required to update to the 2024 5th Edition revision; this change was implemented with a sixty day grace period after the release of each new core rulebook. From 2025 to 2026, the Player's Guide was updated multiple times to include additional sourcebooks, such as Eberron: Forge of the Artificer (2025) and Ravenloft: The Horrors Within (2026).

== WPN play programs (2024–present) ==
=== Legends of Greyhawk ===
In December 2024, Wizards of the Coast announced Legends of Greyhawk as a new convention campaign which debuted at MagicCon: Chicago in February 2025. However, while this campaign is inspired by "past and current organized play campaigns", it uses separate rules from Adventurers League. At Gen Con, in July 2025, they announced an expansion of Legends of Greyhawk as their "newest D&D organized play campaign" with various premier organizers assigned locations within the Greyhawk setting to create adventures for. Samantha Nelson of Polygon reported that it "will run at several other conventions this year before being made widely available for organized play in 2026". Nelson explained that players go from level one to three "after playing at least three adventures" and the "decisions players make in these early adventures will shape the future of the campaign, which is entering its beta phase. The campaign will grow and evolve based on the decisions players make at events worldwide, shaping the future of the campaign and the way that players experience the Greyhawk setting".

In April 2026, Wizards of the Coast announced Legends of Greyhawk was their official new secondary play program for Wizards Play Network (WPN) stores. Legends of Greyhawk features adventures only from organizer partners. As of July 2026, there are three Premier Organizers for the program – GameConclave, West Coast Adventurers Guild, and Baldman Games. From 2025 to 2026, the Legends of Greyhawk Guide was updated multiple times to include additional sourcebooks, such as Eberron: Forge of the Artificer (2025) and Ravenloft: The Horrors Within (2026). On the rule differences between organized play programs, Baldman Games' creative director Savannah Houston-McIntyre explained that "Legends of Greyhawk has a slower level progression and stricter limits on magic items than Adventurers League".

=== Seasonal play and the return of D&D Encounters ===
In March 2026, Wizards of the Coast announced a new seasonal content format for Dungeons & Dragons. The first season, "Season of Horror", featured a return to Ravenloft and included the release of the 5.5 Edition sourcebook Ravenloft: The Horrors Within (2026) along with associated accessory products. In April 2026, they announced Dungeons & Dragons Play Seasons for organized play at WPN stores which correspond with Dungeons & Dragons seasonal releases; for WPN stores, "Season of Horror" events were scheduled to start in June 2026. D&D Encounters, including the recommendation for the program to be run on Wednesdays, returned as part of Play Seasons and features short adventures. The season started with a "D&D Encounters Celebration" event, followed by four "D&D Encounters Weekly Play" events. The second season, "Season of Magic", will also have a five week structure with the Red Wizards' Gambit as the weekly adventure series. It is scheduled to run from September 4 to November 1, 2026, with start date WPN store dependent.

=== Other programs ===
In April 2026, Wizards of the Coast announced that in addition to D&D Encounters, Legends of Greyhawk, and Adventurers League, WPN stores can run "D&D Campaign" and "D&D One-Shot" events for adventures that are not covered by the other event types. This includes campaigns featuring house rules or other custom-made content.

== Reception ==
=== Conventions ===
Jennifer Grouling Cover, in the book The Creation of Narrative in Tabletop Role-Playing Games, highlighted the constraints of RPGA weekend conventions. She wrote, "Because members of the RPGA move from one adventure to another, often with different players, there must be some attempts to maintain consistency in the world and the plotlines experienced. Thus, the DM of an RPGA game does not have the same flexibility that other DMs enjoy. In addition, time is often a constraint. [...] The constraints of the RPGA convention meant that the DM needed to convey certain information about the world and the story for these players to move on to other games during the course of that weekend that would build on this adventure. Therefore, rather than exploring whatever areas of space and elements of plot interested this particular gaming group, there was a pressure to cover certain storylines".

Shannon Appelcline, author of the book Designers & Dragons, wrote, "the ultimate success of the Living City can probably be attributed to its close attention to characters and continuity. [...] However, just before the events really exploded in 1992, it was increasingly obvious that the series of Living City tournaments had become a massive campaign. [...] Meanwhile, the Chemcheaux magic shop began to appear alongside Living City tournaments, allowing players to trade their gold and unwanted magic items for stuff they actually liked. By Gen Con '93 Living City characters and their stuff had become important enough that the RPGA started logging what people had earned, to prevent cheating. [...] Meanwhile, continuity was coming into the Living City tournaments too, truly making Ravens Bluff 'alive'. [...] By the time that the Living City events surpassed the 'classic' RPGA tournaments, they had become a very different sort of tournament. They were focused on continuity of characters and continuity of setting, with adventures that were widely available and which would be run again and again all over the world. This would be the model that would take the Living City successfully into the 21st century and that would be repeated many times over the years, for Living Death (1997-2007), Living Greyhawk (2000-2008), Xen'drik Expeditions (2006-2008), and others".

In 2019, Christian Hoffer, for ComicBook.com, highlighted the D&D Adventurers League Epic as "the closest you'll get to a MMORPG raid in D&D, and it's a really unique experience that everyone should try". Hoffer wrote, "Besides competing with con-goers for a limited number of slots, another potential pratfall to playing at conventions is that they don't have control over who they play with. [...] A bad D&D experience can really sully a person's opinion of the game, and conventions can have a higher risk because you'll likely be playing with people you've never met before. [...] You'll also need to keep in mind that many D&D games have 'hard deadlines,' as the DMs need to run multiple games in a single day. As such, expect for your DM to railroad the story a little bit, or at least try to keep you focused on your main tasks. While exploration and discovery are part of every D&D game, you probably won't have time for a leisurely shopping trip during a convention D&D game".

=== Other organized play ===
In 2016, Scott Thorne, for ICv2, believed the restructuring of the Dungeons & Dragons organized play could be problematic. Thorne wrote, "From where I sit, WOTC just wiped out five years of D&D OP development in one day as it eliminates the two things that made the program successful and made it a viable competitor with Paizo's Pathfinder Society program. [...] Without the Encounters brand, and with WOTC allowing, even encouraging, stores to run events on other days of the week, the Encounters brand, which many stores have spent much time and money building upon, will vanish within a few months. A major reason for Friday Night Magic's decades-long success is that it gets scheduled every Friday night. [...] Under the Encounters program, stores ran the same adventure every Wednesday night. [...] Now, given that WOTC encourages stores (and other locales) to purchase and run scenarios from the Dungeon Master's Guild, players have no idea what any given store has running. [...] The consistency of the program has gone out the window".

In 2018, Christian Hoffer, for ComicBook.com, highlighted the "controversial" rule changes implemented with 8th season of Adventurers League. Hoffer wrote, "instead of players divying up treasure that they can sell in exchange for gold, players instead earn 'treasure points' that can be used to purchase specific items. The concept behind this system is that players can spend treasure points to gain items they want instead of trying to exchange items they find in dungeons or treasure hoards. [...] One of the biggest controversies surrounding the new changes was how the game deals with gold. Players no longer earn gold for completing adventurers, and some players (especially casters) felt that this hurts how they add new spells to their arsenal and cast certain spells. However, admins pointed out that players can still convert treasure points into mundane items that can then be sold off, which would give them more gold than the current system".

In 2020, Jacob Bourque, for CBR, highlighted that the seasonal structure the D&D Adventurers League "irks some people, [since] the AL organization as a whole generally will dictate the module for the league in a season. This may not be a players first choice of adventure, and it will generally be a recent release from Wizards of the Coast". Bourque wrote that role-playing is minimized which "may also irk people. Part of D&D is the roleplaying experience, the acting and the social element of D&D. Quite a few people who go to AL view it as a more competitive version of D&D, though happy to play with first time players, the emphasis is definitely on the mechanics of the game. If players are willing to play a much more tactical D&D game with a lower emphasis on story and roleplaying this shouldn't be too much of an issue though".
