= Sandman: Map of Halaal =

Tabletop role-playing game

Sandman: Map of Halaal is a role-playing game (RPG) published by Pacesetter Ltd in 1985 that was marketed as an "Instant Adventure" requiring no preparation by the players — their characters awake with amnesia and must struggle to discover who they are. Map of Halaal was the first in a planned trilogy of Sandman adventures, but Pacesetter went out of business before the rest of the series could be published.

== Description ==
Sandman: Map of Halaal is an RPG for three players and one gamemaster that is billed as an "Instant Adventure", requiring little or no preparation on the part of the gamemaster or players. The game includes:

- an 8-page introduction book, which includes only four pages of instructions for the gamemaster and no information for the players.
- a "Prop Book" (32 pages) of cut-out maps and clues for the gamemaster to hand out at the appropriate times
- an "Adventure Book" (64 pages) for the gamemaster, which describes four linked scenarios, each one of which is designed to be completed in 2–3 hours.
- a gamemaster's screen

At the start of the game, the characters awaken on a train headed towards Casablanca with no idea of who they are or how they arrived on the train. As the game progresses through the four scenarios, the characters realize they are being manipulated by a sinister being known as the Sandman. The game becomes a struggle for the characters to discover their true identities.

As play progresses, each of the scenarios shifts to a different setting, and each character changes into a different person with different abilities, perhaps from a modern-day medical doctor in one scene to a spellcasting dwarf in the next. Likewise, possessions change abruptly as well. In one scene, the character might own a Smith & Wesson pistol; in the next scene, the handgun might become a magic wand.

More than one reviewer characterized the content of the scenarios as "bizarre", involving magicians, Greek gods, zombie motorcycle gangs, cartoon animals, Captain Hook, Judge Roy Bean, and the cast of the film Casablanca.

Some of the game aids for the gamemaster include comic-strip-style storyboards called Pictograms for each part of the adventure, so that the gamemaster can easily track the players' progress. Game aids for the players include Poetry Cards, each of which contains a snippet of poetry meant to provide clues as to their whereabouts and the Sandman's true identity. In his review of the game, Rick Swan provided an example:

And looking backward as the sand collapses
Into excessive darkness, sight replotted
Out of its hall of mirrors...

== Publication history ==
Pacesetter was founded in 1984 by ex-employees of TSR, who immediately released three role-playing games markedly different from anything TSR had published: Chill, a horror RPG; Star Ace, a science fiction RPG; and Time Master, a multi-genre time travel RPG. All of these games used the same system of rules, making it easy for players to switch between the games.

The following year, Carl Smith announced that Pacesetter was working on a "totally new concept in gaming", which he called the "instant adventure roleplaying game." Pacesetter subsequently released Sandman: Map of Halaal, a boxed set designed by Mark Acres and Andria Hayday, with a cover by David Martin, and announced that two more Sandman products would be published; the mystery presented in Map of Halaal would be revealed in the third and final installment.

As a promotion, Pacesetter offered a prize of $10,000 for the first person to correctly guess the identity of their mystery character before the third installment was published. This prize was never claimed. Pacesetter had been chronically underfunded from the start, and shortly after the first installment of Sandman was published, the company folded.

The rights to all of Pacesetter's games were acquired by 54° 40' Orphyte, who in 2012, sold Sandman to Goblinoid Games, who added it to their new Pacesetter product line and released Sandman as a PDF.

== Reception ==
Games Magazine included Sandman in its "Top 100 Games of 1985", calling the "Instant Adventure" aspect remarkable, and the four included scenarios "engrossing."

In Issue 41 of Different Worlds (January–February 1986), Greg Costikyan pointed out that Pacesetter's other games were well-executed but dull, and Sandman was quite the reverse: "extremely interesting and poorly done." Costikyan commented, "lf Sandman were not flawed in other respects, one might even call it a work of art, for it sets a mood and induces emotions which no other role-playing game can. Its writing is good, its background imaginative." After describing the opening sequence on the train, Costikyan remarked, "If the players do not feel a frisson of disorientation, they are already dead." However, Costikyan pointed out the numerous errors in the game, which he blamed on "sloppiness": Pictogram cards for the gamemaster had pictures on one side, but the explanation on the reverse was misprinted with the wrong text. Costikyan also pointed out several mistakes in the adventures, and questioned the lack of imagination in the adventures. Costikyan also didn't like the absolute linearity of the adventures, with each scene rigidly following the preceding scene with no chance to change this. Costikyan concluded by giving this game a rating of 3 out of 4 stars, saying, "Sandman is an interesting failure. It is an attempt to do something truly innovative, in both system and background. Alas, it fails, through sloppiness and a failure of imagination. Nonetheless, interesting failures have far more to recommend them than dull successes, and Sandman is far worthier of your attention than most recent role-playing releases."

In Issue 31 of the French games magazine Casus Belli , Jean Balczesak wrote, "After testing Sandman, we can confirm: it is possible to start a campaign less than an hour after purchasing the game!" Balczesak liked the numerous game aids to help both the players and the gamemaster, calling them "numerous and well done. Add to that a very nice color gamemaster screen and you have a game that is pleasant to watch and play." Balczesak's only complaint was the wait until the next set of scenarios was released. Balczesak concluded, "the Adventure is there and we never get bored for a second!"

In his 1990 book The Complete Guide to Role-Playing Games, game critic Rick Swan called this game "a truly original, unquestionably bizarre, and extremely frustrating RPG." Swan also noted that "Smooth writing, clear organization and a number of clever play-aids makes the referee's job remarkably easy." Considering the overall effect of the RPG and its playing aids, Swan commented, "No RPG has ever managed to sustain a hallucinatory atmosphere as successfully as Sandman." But Swan pointed out the big problem with the game: because Parts 2 and 3 of the game were never published, "the secret of the Sandman will never be revealed ... Sandman is the equivalent of a movie with the last twenty minutes forever left on the cutting room floor." For this reason, Swan gave the game a rating of 2.5 out of 4.

In his 1991 book Heroic Worlds, Lawrence Schick called the game system "Innovative" and remarked that "Sandman's predesigned characters and programmed adventures with integral rules make for sort of a group interactive gamebook."
