= Clash of Kings (Timemaster) =

Time-travelling role-playing game adventure

Cover art by Susan Collins

Clash of Kings, subtitled "A Tale of Arthur and Merlin", is an adventure published by Pacesetter Ltd in 1984 for their time-travelling role-playing game Time Master.

== Plot summary ==
Timemaster is a game in which players are time-travelling agents of a bureau that seeks to prevent the historical timeline from being changed. Clash of Kings is an adventure in which the player characters are sent back to Britain in 492 CE during the reign of Uther Pendragon. There they will meet dragons, Merlin, Arthur and the evil race of aliens called the Demoreans who are trying to damage the timeline.

== Publication history ==
The games company Pacesetter Ltd was founded by former employees of TSR who had left the company because they felt that in terms of role-playing games, it was headed in the wrong direction. Although Pacesetter was short-lived, it produced several role-playing games within a one-year period, all based around the same house system of rules, with the first three being Chill, Star Ace, and Timemaster.

Pacesetter also published several adventures for Timemaster, including Clash of Kings in 1984, designed by Mark Acres, with cover art by Susan Collins and interior art by Aubrey Beardsley and Stephen Sullivan.

== Reception ==
In Issue 75 of Space Gamer, Steve Crow commented, "Clash of Kings! is a must buy. While its compatibility with other time-travel games (such as Timeship) is low, an enterprising gamemaster might be able to adapt this module, or parts of it, to such games as Star Trek (perhaps replacing Demoreans with Klingons) or Lords of Creation."

In his 1990 book The Complete Guide to Role-Playing Games, game critic Rick Swan called this one of the best adventures published for Timemaster.
