= Time Master =

Science fiction role-playing game

- Cover art by Jim Holloway
- Designers: Mark D. Acres, Andria Hayday, Carl Smith
- Publishers: Pacesetter Ltd, Goblinoid Games
- Publication: 1984 (Pacesetter Ltd), 2011 (Goblinoid Games)
- Genres: science fiction
- Systems: Percentile based (d100)

Time Master: Adventures in the 4th Dimension is a role-playing game centered on traveling through time and alternate dimensions, published by Pacesetter Ltd in 1984. Players take on the role of Time Corps agents who fix deviations in the timeline of the game. The primary antagonists are the Demoreans, a fictional race of shape-shifting aliens from another dimension who are determined to mold time to suit their needs.

== Description ==
Time Master is a role-playing game (RPG) featuring a time-travel system in which the player characters are agents of the Time Corps, an agency based in the year 7192 that is dedicated to preventing enemies from changing history.

The characters are agents who have been rescued from the past and recruited into the Corps ranks, although they are forbidden from returning to any time that coincides with their previous lives. This means that players may create characters who come from any point in history and even from alternate dimensions. Since it is a time travel game, adventures, at the gamemaster's discretion, may be set anywhere from medieval times to the space age.

Character generation starts with randomly determined attribute scores; the player can then allocate a number of points to the attributes. The main antagonists are an evil alien race called the Demoreans, who have also mastered time travel and are intent on changing history to eliminate their enemies.

Movement and combat are position-oriented, designed for use with counters on a hex grid. There are separate rules for personal combat, for skirmishes with hundreds on each side, and for mass combat involving armies.

The 64-page "Traveler's Manual" covers characters, combat (individual characters and mass battles), skills, paranormal talents, equipment, and non-player characters. The 32-page "Guide to the Continuum" describes the Time Corps and the enemy Demoreans, with brief overviews of ancient Athens, Rome during the time of Julius Caesar, medieval England, Tudor England, Napoleonic France, and World War II France.

Because it uses the same system of rules, Timemaster is compatible with its sibling RPGs Chill and Star Ace.

=== Significance Rating ===
Each non-player character is rated for historical significance, which indicates how much of an effect that person has on the historical timeline. For example, a British soldier in the 19th century would have a very low Significance Rating compared to Queen Victoria. Using these ratings, the gamemaster can keep track of how successful the players are at preventing major alterations to the historical timeline.

=== Scenarios ===
The 16-page "Red Ace High" booklet is an introductory scenario set during World War I.

== Publication history ==
The games company Pacesetter Ltd was founded by former employees of TSR who had left the company because they felt that in terms of role-playing games, it was headed in the wrong direction. Although Pacesetter was short-lived, it produced several role-playing games within a one-year period, all based around the same house system of rules, with the first three being Chill, Star Ace, and Timemaster.

Timemaster was designed by Mark Acres, Garry Spiegle, Andria Hayday, Carl Smith, and Gali Sanchez, with cover art by Jim Holloway. Timemaster was published as a boxed set containing

- two books (64 pages and 32 pages)
- a 16-page pamphlet
- a large color map
- counters
- dice

After Pacesetter folded in 1986, their assets were acquired by 54°40' Orphyte, who published two Time Master adventures, Miss Him, Miss Him, Miss Him (1991) and Darkest Before the Dawn (1992), and also supported the line with RPGA tournaments. In 2011, Goblinoid Games purchased all rights to Timemaster from 54°40' Orphyte.

== Products ==
Numerous products have been published for Timemaster.

=== Pacesetter edition ===
- Time Master (box set)

==== Game tools ====
- Timemaster Screen (a gamemaster's screen that included the scenario Missing: PT 109)

==== Sourcebooks and scenarios ====
- The Assassin Queen (scenario)
- Clash of Kings (scenario)
- The Cleopatra Gambit (scenario)
- Crossed Swords (scenario)
- Partisans from the Shadows (scenario)
- Sea Dogs of England (scenario)
- Temples of Blood (scenario)
- Terrible Swift Ford (scenario)
- Timestorm (scenario)
- Timetricks (sourcebook)
- Whom the Gods Destroy (scenario)

=== 54° 40' Orphyte, Inc. products ===
==== Scenarios ====
- Darkest Before the Dawn (scenario)
- Miss Him, Miss Him, Miss Him (scenario)

=== Pacesetter System game line (Goblinoid Games) ===
- Timemaster Core Rulebook

== Reception ==
In Issue 31 of Abyss, Dave Nalle noted, "The game system here is simple and easy to play. The rules are a bit disorganized and strangely arranged. The background is basic but playable." However, Nalle pointed out "Timemaster seems more like a tactical wargame with some character rules thrown in as an afterthought ... It seems that they expect players to fight rather than think their way through situations." Nalle concluded by grudgingly recommending this game "only because there are far too few attempts of any quality to do time-travel games (not an easy task.) Perhaps future releases will be better integrated and more progressive in design."

Steve Norledge reviewed Timemaster for White Dwarf #61, and stated that "Overall, I quite liked Timemaster — it is an unpretentious little game, simple and yet provides the best yet framework for time travel rolegaming." Norledge concluded by giving it an overall rating of 7 out of 10, saying, "It is eminently suited to the 'one-off' style of play, and, yet, with effort, would also be a good campaign game (though it would have a very episodic feel to it)."

Jim Bambra reviewed Timemaster for the British games magazine Imagine, and stated that "With its infinite variety of settings Timemaster has a lot of potential. Players can experience many different situations and save the world numerous times over."

Russell Grant Collins reviewed Timemaster for Different Worlds magazine and stated that "The bottom line on this game is that once we got used to the system, my friends and I enjoyed it and plan to play it in the future. It is by no means perfect, but still enjoyable. For those who are interested in that sort of thing, TimeMaster is supposed to be totally compatible with Pacesetter's other adventure games, Chill and Star Ace."

In Issue 75 of Space Gamer (July–August 1985), Warren Spector commented, "Time travel RPGs seem to be in a mini-renaissance these days. If you're into this sort of game (and I confess, I'm not), Timemaster may be a good choice. It's got a fairly interesting unifying theme; the game does an excellent job of making time travel seem plausible, and the "Guide to the Continuum" is a gem. In this most open-ended form of roleplaying, providing players direction is no simple task. Timemaster does a fine job."

In Issue 21 of the Australian gaming magazine Breakout!, Bruce Probst liked the presentation, writing, "the components are colourful, the rules are written in a large easy-to-read type, the artwork is plentiful, appropriate and reasonably well done." However, Probst found the rules themselves to be faulty, noting, "There are some very nice ideas in this game, but most of them are presented poorly." Probst felt that characters did not have enough skills to handle even beginning challenges, and also commented, "While reading skill descriptions such as [archery], I had the definite impression the designers of this game didn't know a lot about the subjects that they were trying to simulate." Probst found many faults with combat, chief among them the idea that all weapons from a butter knife to a machine gun do the same amount of damage. Probst concluded, "In summary, I cannot recommend Time Master unless you are willing to devote a lot of effort to make it work. On the other hand, if you simply enjoy playing a game, without regard to illogical backgrounds and terrible rules, then I can envision Time Master as being quite fun. It has a lot of promise; given more thought, it could have been a really great game."

In his 1990 book The Complete Guide to Role-Playing Games, game critic Rick Swan commented, "What separates Timemaster from other time-travelling RPGs is its intriguing premise." Despite this, Swan found the game mechanics "mix the elegant with the clumsy, resulting in an awkward set of rules that requires a lot of second-guessing from the referee." On the awkward side, Swan found the multi-mode combat rules "extremely complicated, forcing players to switch between role-playing and board gaming." But Swan found the character generation system "nicely handled." Swan concluded by giving the game a rating of 2.5 out of 4, saying "Timemaster is now out of print. Too bad, because in spite of its flaws, it's a terrific time travel RPG, second only to TimeLords.

In the 2014 book Designers & Dragons, game historian Shannon Appelcline commented that Timemaster "did more to play up the issues of time travel than any of the other scant few games in the genre, past or future".

== Other reviews ==
- Asimov's Science Fiction v8 n13 (1984 12 Mid))
