= Timemaster Screen =

Timemaster Screen is a 1984 role-playing game supplement published by Pacesetter Ltd for Time Master.

== Contents ==
Timemaster Screen is a supplement in which a gamemaster's screen includes a short adventure scenario centered on John F. Kennedy's PT-109 boat during World War II.

== Publication history ==
Timemaster Referee's Screen with Missing: PT 109 was written by Carl Smith, with a cover by Mitch O'Connell and published by Pacesetter Ltd in 1984 as a cardstock screen with an 8-page pamphlet.

== Reception ==
Russell Grant Collins reviewed Timemaster Screen for Different Worlds magazine and stated that "the TimeMaster Screen they recently released does not contain all the charts in the game, although it needlessly reprints the action table and the skills list. And the mini-module seems greatly slanted against the characters. I'd advise only compulsive completists to pick it up."
