= Apparency =

Apparency may refer to:

- the quality, or degree, of being apparent or visible
  - Interface apparency, in user interface design
- the position of an heir apparent

== See also ==
- Apparent (disambiguation)
- Appearance (disambiguation)
