= Crossed Swords (Timemaster) =

Tabletop role-playing game adventure

Cover art by Ben Otero, 1984

Crossed Swords is an adventure published by Pacesetter Ltd in 1984 for the fantasy time-travel role-playing game Time Master.

== Plot summary ==
The Time Corps agents are sent back in time to investigate strange events involving the Three Musketeers. Like the novels of Alexandre Dumas, the players have to contend with the rival guards of Cardinal Richelieu as well as the political intrigue of the court of Louis XIV at Versailles.

== Publication history ==
The small game company Pacesetter was founded by former employees of TSR who had left the company because they felt that in terms of role-playing games, it was headed in the wrong direction. One of Pacesetter's products was Timemaster, in which player characters are agents of the Time Corps, which is defending the timeline against attacks by an insidious enemy. The agents are sent to various important events in history, including fictional history.

The first adventure for Timemaster was Crossed Swords, a 32-page book written by Carl Smith, with a cover by Ben Otero and illustrations by Jim Roslof and Stephen Sullivan.

== Reception ==
In the January 1985 edition of White Dwarf (Issue #61), Steve Norledge called this scenario "refreshingly light-hearted in feel and there are profuse opportunities for amusing role-playing." Norledge liked the potential for creative play, saying, "It is a scenario for role-playing - hardly a sterile dungeon crawl of the sort that some companies persist in putting out." He concluded by giving the scenario an average rating of 7 out of 10, commenting, "though this one does have its flaws it's a good start from a new company. Now if you'll excuse me I have a certain Cardinal Richelieu to deal with . . ."

Russell Grant Collins reviewed Crossed Swords for Different Worlds magazine and stated that "The concept behind this adventure is a good one; with a little work it could be a great one. I recommend it particularly if the gamemaster has read the original (preferably recently) and is willing to fix up a few things."

== Other recognition ==
A copy of Crossed Swords is held in the collection of the Strong National Museum of Play (Object ID: 117.492).
