= Creature Feature (Chill) =

Role-playing game supplement

Creature Feature is a supplement published by Pacesetter in 1986 for the horror fantasy role-playing game Chill.

== Publication history ==
Creature Feature was written by Mark Acres with Troy Denning and Stephen D. Sullivan, and was published by Pacesetter in 1986 as a 96-page book.

== Contents ==
Creature Feature provides rules for players to create characters based on classic monsters such as vampires, mummies, ghosts and werewolves. The book presents new combat rules and skills for these characters, and includes character sheets for any kind of player character monsters.

In the 2014 book Designers & Dragons: The '80s, author Shannon Appelcline commented that one "late product from [Pacesetter] was Creature Feature (1986), a supplement for Chill that let players take on the role of monsters. It predated Stellar Games' Nightlife (1990) and White Wolf's Vampire: The Masquerade (1991) by years, and may well have been the first release in the urban-monster genre of RPGs — though the general concept of monsters as PCs dated back to at least Metagaming's Monsters! Monsters! (1976)."

== Reception ==
In the December 1988 edition of Dragon (Issue 140), Jim Bambra noted that Pacesetter had recently run into financial problems, and that this book lacked "the graphic quality or refined presentation of the finer Chill supplements." He did find that the book "does have an oddly redeeming appeal", although the replay value of players playing monsters would be "negligible". As a result, he concluded that "Creature Feature will not be of use to most GMs, but students of the hobby may find it interesting for a brief diversion or as a curiosity."

== Reviews ==
- Knights of the Dinner Table Magazine (Issue 118 - Aug 2006)
