= Haunter of the Moor =

Haunter of the Moor: Three Tales of Terror is a 1985 role-playing game adventure published by Pacesetter Ltd for Chill.

== Plot summary ==
Haunter of the Moor is an adventure in which three connected werewolf adventures unfold at a remote estate on the moors.

== Publication history ==
Haunter of the Moor was written by Gali Sanchez with a cover by Zoya and illustrations by Stephen D. Sullivan and published by Pacesetter in 1985 as a 32-page book.
