= Evenings of Terror =

1985 tabletop game adventure

Evenings of Terror is a 1985 role-playing game adventure published by Pacesetter Ltd for Chill.

== Plot summary ==
Evenings of Terror is an adventure in which nine standalone or interconnected adventures are framed as a full campaign, each introduced by Elvira.

== Publication history ==
Evenings of Terror with Elvira was written by Mark Acres, Gali Sanchez, and Michael Willimas and published by Pacesetter in 1986 as a 96-page book.

== Reviews ==
- Knights of the Dinner Table Magazine (Issue 118 - Aug 2006)
