= Deathwatch on the Bayou =

1985 tabletop game adventure

Deathwatch on the Bayou is a 1985 role-playing game adventure published by Pacesetter Ltd for Chill.

== Plot summary ==
Deathwatch on the Bayou is an adventure in which the player characters can become involved in two Louisiana bayou adventures—one about the restless dead rising, the other about a mysterious island that traps all who set foot on it.

== Publication history ==
Deathwatch on the Bayou was written by Gali Sanchez with a cover by Jerry Eaton and illustrations by Stephen D. Sullivan and published by Pacesetter in 1985 as a 32-page book.

== Reviews ==
- Casus Belli #40 (as "Le bayou de la mort")
