= Grav =

Grav may refer to:

== People ==
- Ray Gravell (1951-2007), Welsh rugby union player
- Tommy Grav (born 1973), Norwegian astrophysicist

== Places ==
- Grav, Bærum, Norway
- Grav, Viken, Norway

== Physics ==
- General Relativity and Gravitation
- Gravitational constant

== Other ==
- Gravlax, Nordic dish
- Grav (CMS)
- Grav Armor
- Grav-Ball
