= Timetricks: A Survivor's Guide to Time Travel =

Timetricks: A Survivor's Guide to Time Travel is a 1985 role-playing game supplement published by Pacesetter Ltd for Time Master.

== Contents ==
Timetricks: A Survivor's Guide to Time Travel is a supplement in which new rules, equipment, skills, and paranormal abilities are introduced, which also expands on the Time Corps and Demorans, and explored the theory behind time travel.

== Publication history ==
Timetricks: A Survivor's Guide to Time Travel was written by Mark Acres, with a cover by David Martin and illustrations by Ron Randall and published by Pacesetter Ltd in 1985 as 96-page book.

== Reception ==
Lawrence Schick in his book Heroic Worlds noted that the supplement "Includes cool stuff on the theory of time travel."

== Reviews ==
- Analog Science Fiction and Fact
- Diary of Doctor Who Role Playing Games
- The Complete Guide to Role-Playing Games
