= Star Trek: The Role Playing Game Game Master's Screen =

Tabletop role-playing game supplement

Star Trek: The Role Playing Game Game Master's Screen is a 1983 role-playing game supplement for Star Trek: The Role Playing Game published by FASA.

== Contents ==
Star Trek: The Role Playing Game Game Master's Screen compiled information from the original game rules, plus the Trader Captains and Merchant Princes and The Klingons expansions into a 16-page booklet and a three-panel Gamemaster's screen.

Game Master's Screen is a GM's screen for 1st-ed. rules, with a booklet of play-aids and character sheets.

== Publication history ==
Game Master's Screen was published by FASA Corp. in 1984 as a cardstock screen with a 16-page pamphlet.

== Reception ==
Frederick Paul Kiesche III reviewed Star Trek: The Role Playing Game Gamemaster's Screen in Space Gamer No. 68. Kiesche commented that "I would recommend this product to those who play or referee ST:TRPG. Any problems that you may find could be fixed with a little effort on your own part."
