= Isle of the Dead (Chill) =

Isle of the Dead is a 1984 role-playing game adventure published by Pacesetter Ltd for Chill.

== Plot summary ==
Isle of the Dead is an adventure in which an abandoned island amusement park becomes a deadly playground where a terrifying fun house and nightly ghosts await intruders.

== Publication history ==
Isle of the Dead was written by Jon Brunelle with a cover by Les Dorscheid and illustrations by Stephen D. Sullivan and published by Pacesetter in 1984 as a 32-page book.

== Reviews ==
- Game News (Issue 2 - Apr 1985)
