= Ola Henmo =

Norwegian author (born 1965)

Ola Henmo (born 1965) is a Norwegian journalist and non-fiction writer.

Hailing from Grav in Bærum, he played football for the clubs Frigg, Fossum, Stabæk and then Fossum again.

He became a journalist working 15 years in Aftenposten. As a journalist he worked extensively with the 2011 Norway attacks, and was a consultant for the television series Utøya. He published a book for the 75th anniversary of the Norwegian Cancer Society (2013) and portrait books about activist Kim Friele (2015) and disabled politician Torstein Lerhol (2019), the latter two on the publishing house Cappelen Damm.
