= Apparition =

Apparition may refer to:

== Supernatural ==
- Apparitional experience, an anomalous, quasi-perceptual experience
- A vision, something seen in a dream, trance, or religious ecstasy
- Ghost, the soul or spirit of a dead person or animal that can appear to the living
- Doppelgänger, the ghostly double of a living person
- Bilocation, the ability to be in two places at once

== Media ==
=== Music ===
- Apparition, a 2009 EP by The Contortionist
- Apparition, a 2022 EP by Jambinai
- Apparitions, a 2015 EP by Urfaust
- Apparition (The Legendary Pink Dots album), 1982
- "Apparition", a 2006 song by Canadian band Delerium on their album Nuages du Monde
- "Apparitions" (song), 1998, by Matthew Good Band
- "Apparitions", a song by Sylosis from Edge of the Earth
- "The Apparition", a song by Beyond the Bridge
- "The Apparition", a song from Despised Icon's 2025 album Shadow Work
- "The Apparition", a song from Iron Maiden's 1992 album Fear of the Dark
- "The Apparition", a song by Sleep Token from Take Me Back to Eden
- "Apparition", a song by Epica from Aspiral

=== Film ===
- The Apparition (1903 film), a silent comedy
- Apparition (1943 film), an Italian comedy film
- The Apparition (2012 film), a 2012 supernatural horror film
- Aparisyon, a 2012 Philippine film whose title translates to "Apparition"
- The Apparition (2018 film), a drama

=== Other media ===
- Apparition (company), a former U.S. film distribution company
- Apparition (Harry Potter), a fictional form of teleportation
- Apparitions (TV series), a 2008 BBC series about an exorcist
- Phantom Girl (also known as Apparition Girl), a DC Comics superheroine
- Apparitions, an orchestral work by György Ligeti
- Apparitions, a 1936 ballet choreographed by Sir Frederick Ashton with music by Franz Liszt

== Other uses ==
- Apparition Mountain, Alberta, Canada
- Apparition, the appearance of a comet
- Apparitions (Chill), a 1991 supplement for the role-playing game Chill

== See also ==
- Marian apparition, a supernatural experience involving the Virgin Mary
- Apparitional (film), a 2013 horror film
- Apparition of Face and Fruit Dish on a Beach, a 1938 painting by Salvador Dalí
- Appearance (disambiguation)
- Demonic possession
- Eidolon (disambiguation)
- Ghost (disambiguation)
- Phantom (disambiguation)
