= Village of Twilight =

Role-playing game supplement

Village of Twilight is a 1984 role-playing game adventure for Chill published by Pacesetter.

== Contents ==
Village of Twilight is an adventure which the player characters are members of S.A.V.E. leading a southern Mexico jungle expedition searching for a creature from the Unknown.

== Reception ==
Jerry Epperson reviewed Village of Twilight in Space Gamer No. 71. Epperson commented that "If Village of Twilight is a model of what we can expect from Pacesetter in the future, then they will have no problem obtaining a reserved spot on every gamer's shelf. I definitely recommend it to those who purchased the original Chill game and thought the introductory adventure included with the game, "Terror in Warwick House," was terrible. Village of Twilight more than makes amends."

Keith Herber reviewed Village of Twilight for Different Worlds magazine and stated that "While Village Of Twilight offered a lot of action and adventure, it is hoped that future scenarios will also exploit the many opportunities for investigation and research which the rules allow for. In the game's defense, it seems that a gamemaster/designer can carefully emphasize either aspect of Chill to find a balance that suits his particular group of players."

Angus M McLellan reviewed Village of Twilight for White Dwarf #61, giving it an overall rating of 6 out of 10, and stated that "Village of Twilight is a well written Chill scenario, but it's little use for anything else; so unless you enjoy Chill, I can't really recommend it, but I'd be interested to see a second edition."

== Reviews ==
- Casus Belli #40 (Oct 1987)
- Jeux et Stratégie #48 (as "Le Village du crépuscule")
