= Margin of Profit =

Tabletop role-playing game adventure

Margin of Profit is a 1984 role-playing game adventure for Star Trek: The Role Playing Game published by FASA.

== Contents ==
Margin of Profit is an adventure module to be used with Trader Captains and Merchant Princes, and involves the political machinations of the planet Coridan (as seen in the episode "Journey to Babel").

== Reception ==
R Jarnor reviewed Margin of Profit for White Dwarf #65, giving it an overall rating of 8 out of 10, and stated that "It could well be used as an introduction to a merchant campaign, since although it is based around a merchant deal, no real merchant orientated decisions have to be taken by the players."

Bob Mosley III reviewed Margin of Profit in Space Gamer No. 75. Mosley commented that "Margin of Profit is an exceptional module. The main plot is clear and defined, and the subplots and distractions for the players are detailed as well. Using the material supplies in this module, and extensive merchant campaign can be started with this mission on Cordian."
