= Goodbye, Kankee =

Goodbye, Kankee is a 1984 role-playing game adventure for Star Ace published by Pacesetter.

== Plot summary ==
Goodbye, Kankee is an adventure which begins with the player characters searching for work to pay off their debts.

== Publication history ==
Goodbye, Kankee is the first Star Ace adventure module in the series.

== Reception ==
Steve Crow reviewed Goodbye, Kankee in Space Gamer No. 75. Crow commented that "I would definitely recommend Goodbye, Kankee to anyone looking for a good time or anyone wanting to get an idea of how sf games (not necessarily Star Ace) should be handled. The uniqueness of the Star Ace background/history and aliens might make this a bit difficult for adaption to other games, but the premise of this adventure can be used almost anywhere."
