= Vengeance of Dracula =

1984 supplemental adventure for the tabletop role-playing game Chill by Pacesetter Ltd

Vengeance of Dracula is a 1984 role-playing game adventure published by Pacesetter Ltd for Chill.

== Plot summary ==
Vengeance of Dracula is an adventure in which a continuation of Bram Stoker's original novel is adapted for role-playing games. The adventure begins with Dracula's return to England, and the player characters—cast as envoys—are given minimal clues and a sketch map leading them to Hillingham Estate, once home to Lucy Westenra. From this base, they investigate a trail of murders, disappearances, and vampire activity that eventually leads to Carfax and a climactic confrontation. The scenario includes detailed maps of both estates and eight pre-generated character cards. Players encounter figures like one of Dr. Seward's patients, a devoted servant of Dracula with a grotesque obsession with insects.

== Publication history ==
Vengeance of Dracula was written by Gali Sanchez, with a cover by Susan Collins and art by William Reinhold, and published by Pacesetter in 1984 as a 32-page book.

== Reception ==
S. Dillon reviewed Vengeance of Dracula for Adventurer magazine and stated that "To conclude, for those with a passion for vampires, suspense and horror, this is a must. At [the price] though, the material does seem a little scarce. I would have preferred more suspense, but there Is a mystery to solve, and one which keeps the players guessing."

== Reviews ==
- Adventurers Club (Issue 6 - Winter 1984)
