= Trouble Brewing =

Trouble Brewing may refer to:

- Trouble Brewing (1939 film), a 1939 British film
- Trouble Brewing (1924 film), a 1924 silent comedy film
- Trouble Brewing (brewery), an Irish craft brewery based in Allenwood, County Kildare
- Trouble Brewing (Gangbusters), a 1982 tabletop game adventure
