= Witness for the Defense =

Witness for the Defense may refer to:

- Witness for the Defense (Murder, She Wrote), an episode of Murder, She Wrote
- Witness for the Defense (Star Trek: The Role Playing Game), a 1983 role-playing game
- The Witness for the Defence, a 1913 novel by A.E.W. Mason
- The Witness for the Defense, a 1919 American silent drama, based on the novel
