= Death on Tour =

1985 adventure module for the tabletop role-playing game Chill by Pacesetter Ltd

Death on Tour is a 1985 role-playing game adventure published by Pacesetter Ltd for Chill.

== Plot summary ==
Death on Tour is an adventure in which the player characters must investigate and stop supernatural creatures, including a rock vampire who preys on concertgoers. The adventure is structured around various horrors tied to the entertainment world, blending mystery, action, and supernatural threats.

== Publication history ==
Death on Tour was written by Jon Brunelle, with a cover by Les Dorscheid and illustrations by Jim Holloway, and published by Pacesetter in 1985 as a 32-page book.

== Reception ==
Russell Grant Collins reviewed Vampires and Death on Tour for Different Worlds magazine and stated that "In conclusion, Vampires is recommended to any gamemaster with an interest in the subject, because even if he uses a vastly different system, he should get a number of ideas from it. Death On Tour is less recommended because after all you can only run it once, whereas there are many variations on the theme in Vampires (and with the article in Vampires, you have the major concept). Still, if you run Chill, it is not a bad module."

== Reviews ==
- The VIP of Gaming (Issue 4 - Jul 1986)
- Casus Belli (Issue 40 - Oct 1987)
