= Things (Chill) =

Tabletop role-playing game supplement

- Publisher: Pacesetter
- Publication date: 1984

Things is a 1984 role-playing game supplement for Chill published by Pacesetter.

== Contents ==
Things is a supplement that details and provides game statistics for over 50 new creatures from the Unknown and 17 more animals that player characters may encounter.

== Reception ==
William A. Barton reviewed Things in Space Gamer No. 71. Barton commented that "Things is a book no Chillmaster should be without (likewise any Chill player who wishes a long life for his or her character). GMs of other supernatural RPGs such as Stalking the Night Fantastic could probably make good use of at least some of the information in Things, too."

== Reviews ==
- Adventurers Club #6 (Winter, 1984 Digest)
- Casus Belli #38 (June 1987)
- Knights of the Dinner Table Magazine (Issue 118 - Aug 2006)
