= Highland Terror =

1984 adventure for the role-playing game Chill

Highland Terror is a 1984 role-playing game adventure for Chill published by Pacesetter.

== Publication history ==
Highland Terror is the second adventure for Chill.

== Plot summary ==
Highland Terror is an adventure in which the player characters confront the Loch Ness Monster and Celtic gods in the Scottish Highlands.

== Reception ==
William A. Barton reviewed Highland Terror in Space Gamer No. 75. Barton commented that "Highland Terror is a solid adventure for Chill (or other supernatural horror RPGs), and shows improvement over the game's first adventure supplement – which bodes well for both Pacesetter and Chill fans."

== Reviews ==
- Game News #6 (Aug., 1985)
