= Thutmose's Night =

1985 tabletop game adventure

Thutmose's Night is a 1985 role-playing game adventure published by Pacesetter Ltd for Chill.

== Plot summary ==
Thutmose's Night is an adventure in which a string of murders follows a touring exhibit of ancient Egyptian mummies.

== Publication history ==
Thutmose's Night was written by Jon Brunelle with a cover by David Dorman and illustrations by Shaun Reynolds and published by Pacesetter in 1985 as a 32-page book.

== Reviews ==
- Casus Belli #40 (as "La nuit de Thoutmès")
- Game News #10 (Dec., 1985)
