= Murder in Harmony =

Murder in Harmony is a 1982 role-playing game adventure published by TSR for Gangbusters.

== Plot summary ==
Murder in Harmony is an adventure in which a classic murder mystery unfolds at a high-society gathering, when ties to organized crime surface.

== Publication history ==
GB2 Murder in Harmony was written by Mark Acres, with a cover by Jeff Easley and illustrations by Tim Truman, and was published by TSR in 1982 as a 32-page book with an outer folder.
