= Death on the Docks =

Death on the Docks is a 1983 role-playing game adventure published by TSR for Gangbusters.

== Plot summary ==
Death on the Docks is an adventure in which a murder erupts from a mix of clashing factions—bootleggers, revolutionaries, union-busters, and an enigmatic Russian beauty. The player characters must untangle the events leading to the crime, to uncover who acted—and when.

== Publication history ==
GB3 Death on the Docks was written by Mark D. Acres, with a cover by Tim Truman and illustrations by Jim Holloway and published by TSR in 1983 as a 32-page book with an outer folder.
