= Blood Moon Rising (Chill) =

1985 tabletop game adventure

Blood Moon Rising is a 1985 role-playing game adventure published by Pacesetter Ltd for Chill.

== Plot summary ==
Blood Moon Rising is an adventure in which the player characters are on a mission to capture an Alaskan abominable snowman that spirals into a desperate hunt for a werewolf master after several team members become infected.

== Publication history ==
Blood Moon Rising was written by Troy Denning with a cover by Les Dorscheid and published by Pacesetter in 1985 as a 32-page book.
