= The Cleopatra Gambit =

Tabletop role-playing game supplement

The Cleopatra Gambit is a 1984 role-playing game adventure for Time Master published by Pacesetter.

== Plot summary ==
The Cleopatra Gambit is an adventure in which the player characters must stop the shape-shifting Demoreans from carrying out their plans in ancient Egypt.

== Reception ==
Russell Grant Collins reviewed The Cleopatra Gambit in Space Gamer No. 74. Collins commented that "With work, the GM can make a decent session of play from this module, but if he or she doesn't have the time or inclination to do so, it certainly isn't worth it."
