= Eidolon (disambiguation) =

In ancient Greek literature, an eidolon (plural: eidola or eidolons) is the spirit-image of a living or dead person; it is a shade or phantom look-alike of the human form.

Eidolon may also refer to:

== Companies ==
- Eidolon Publications, a small press publisher based in North Perth, Western Australia
  - Eidolon Books, the book publishing arm of the company
  - Eidolon (magazine) (1990–2000), a periodical that was published by the company

== Culture ==
- James Bond 007: Eidolon, a James Bond comic book by Dynamite Entertainment
- Eidolon I, a 2006 speculative fiction anthology edited by Jonathan Strahan and Jeremy G. Byrne
- Eidolon, an online journal for scholarly writing about classics and antiquity founded by Donna Zuckerberg

=== Music ===
- Eidolon (band), a heavy metal band
- Eidola (band), a progressive rock/metal band
- Eidolon (album), an album by black metal band Dark Fortress
- Eidolon, a 2017 album by guitarist Allan Holdsworth
- "Eidolon", a track and single by Karnivool from their 2013 album Asymmetry
- "Eidolon", a track by Erra from their 2021 self-titled album
- "Eidolon", a track by Tapir! from their 2024 album The Pilgrim, Their God and the King of My Decrepit Mountain
- "Eidolon", a track by Arca from her 2026 album XXXXX

=== Video games ===
- Eidolon (video game), a video game from 2014 by Ice Water Games
- The Eidolon, a computer game from the 1980s by Lucasfilm Games
- Eidolon, a summoned creep spawned by the hero Enigma in Dota 2
- Eidolons, a type of summoned companions in Aura Kingdom
- Eidolons, a type of Summoned Monster in several Final Fantasy games
- Eidolon, the main antagonist in the video game Hexen II
- The Plains of Eidolon and the Eidolons, an open world area and a class of bosses respectively in the online game Warframe

== Other uses ==
- Eidolon (bat), a genus of bats

== See also ==
- Apparition (disambiguation)
