= Reappearance =

Reappearance may refer to:

- Record of Agarest War: Re-appearance, a 2008 role-playing video game
- Reappearance (novel), a 2002 science fiction novel

== See also ==
- Appearance (disambiguation)
