= Vampires (Chill) =

1985 horror RPG supplement

Cover of Pacesetter edition, artwork by Susan Collins 1985

Vampires is a supplement published by Pacesetter Ltd in 1985 for the horror role-playing game Chill.

== Contents ==
Vampires is a sourcebook featuring information about ten different vampires. These can be used as major antagonists in a Chill campaign.

Each vampire is given a biography, a description of its particular powers and weaknesses, and role-playing game statistics.

The book includes a short sample adventure, "Vengeance of Dracula", set some years after Bram Stoker's novel, when Dracula returns to England to exact his revenge.

== Publication history ==
The horror role-playing game Chill was published by Pacesetter in 1984. The following year, Pacesetter published a number of supplements, including Vampires, a 96-page softcover book designed by Gali Sanchez and Michael Williams, with interior artwork by Stephen Sullivan and cover art by Susan Collins.

After Pacesetter went out of business, Mayfair Games acquired the rights to Chill and published a second edition in 1990. Mayfair also revised and expanded Vampires, publishing a 128-page second edition again designed by Sanchez and Williams, with interior artwork by Mark Beachum, Mari Paz Cabardo, Terry Pavlet, and Ike Scott, and cover art by Joe DeVelasco.

== Reception ==
Russell Grant Collins reviewed Vampires and Death on Tour for Different Worlds magazine and stated that "In conclusion, Vampires is recommended to any gamemaster with an interest in the subject, because even if he uses a vastly different system, he should get a number of ideas from it. Death On Tour is less recommended because after all you can only run it once, whereas there are many variations on the theme in Vampires (and with the article in Vampires, you have the major concept). Still, if you run Chill, it is not a bad module."

S. Dillon reviewed Vampires for Adventurer magazine and stated that "A potential source of many adventures, or as the basis for a whole campaign, Vampires also makes interesting reading for players and GMs who want to encourage a more serious attitude than 'Oh, it's just a 7th. level vampire with pointy teeth!'"

Daniel Huber reviewed Vampires in White Wolf #29 (Oct./Nov., 1991), rating it a 4 out of 5 and stated that "For those who love Bram Stoker's (traditional) vampires, Dracula will be interesting to play. I think the other ten vampires will be very useful to the Chillmaster to create the proper atmosphere of horror. Vampires makes a good supplement for Chill and fascinating reading for those who enjoy vampire tales."

In Issue 186 of Dragon (October 1992), Rick Swan called this "the best of the Chill sourcebooks — in fact, one of the best horror sourcebooks, period." Swan described the writing style of Gali Sanchez and Michael Williams as "a controlled, eloquent style that captures both the sensuality and otherworldliness of the undead." However, Swan felt the included scenario "ends the book with more of a fizzle than a bang. After a promising beginning, the adventure degenerates into a series of ho-hum scares and an unsatisfying ending." Swan concluded "I would've liked stronger scenarios and a few more adventure hooks, but all in all, the fastidious research, evocative writing, and enthusiasm for the material makes for a winning combination."

== Other reviews and commentary ==
- Asimov's Science Fiction
- Jeux et Stratégie
- Game News (Issue 8 – Oct 1985)
- Casus Belli (Issue 44 – Apr 1988)
- Knights of the Dinner Table Magazine (Issue 118 - Aug 2006)
