= Fantasy Masters' Screen =

Fantasy role-playing game supplement

- Publishers: Metagaming Concepts
- Publication: 1981
- Genres: Fantasy

Fantasy Masters' Screen is a supplement published by Metagaming Concepts in 1981 for the fantasy role-playing game The Fantasy Trip.

== Description ==
Fantasy Masters' Screen is a 25.5 in × 11 in (65 cm × 28 cm) trifold cardstock gamemaster's screen that contains, on the gamemaster's side, tables and information to run a game session. This includes weapon tables, a turn sequence, character actions, time for actions, dexterity adjustments, saving throws, reactions to injury, hearing noise, weight, special actions, movements, rolls to hit, rolls to miss, experience, buying, selling, and a cost list.

== Publication history ==
In the wake of the original and popular fantasy role-playing game (FRPG) Dungeons & Dragons, Metagaming Concepts released their own FRPG, The Fantasy Trip, designed by Steve Jackson and originally released in two parts: Melee (1977) and Wizard (1978). Eventually an expanded edition titled The Fantasy Trip was published as four separate books in 1980. The following year, the Fantasy Master's Screen, a cardstock screen that gathered information from all of the books, was released as a supplement.

== Reception ==
In Issue 41 of The Space Gamer, William A. Barton liked that this screen gathered together information from several books, making it "extremely handy to have all this information at the GM's fingertips, rather than having it spread out through the three books. A lot of time previously spent flipping through pages can now be devoted to play time instead." Barton thought that the tables for Dexterity adjustments were "especially welcome as this is the first time all the various adjustments to a character’s dexterity have been compiled in one place ... The same goes for the chart of saving throws. The presence of these two tables alone make the screen well worth the price." Barton did note that "Some errors do appear to have crept in." Despite this, Barton concluded, "Regardless of what errors did creep in, the Fantasy Masters' Screen is an item no TFT GM should overlook. Pick it up and never again will you be forced to use an old notebook or (for shame!) a D&D shield in your Labyrinth sessions."

In Issue 8 of Interplay, Ron Hopkins called this "the single most useful item for TFT Fantasy Masters ... It contains easy reference data ... Useful is an understatement."

Ian Livingstone, writing in Dicing with Dragons, called this "Essential tables and charts combined into one accessory."
