= The Vanishing Investigator =

Role-playing game supplement

The Vanishing Investigator is a 1983 role-playing game adventure for Gangbusters published by TSR.

== Contents ==
The Vanishing Investigator is an adventure scenario in which the player characters join the search for a senator and his family who went missing just prior to his Senate Committee on Organized Crime hearings.

== Reception ==
Jerry Epperson reviewed The Vanishing Investigator in Space Gamer No. 70. Epperson commented that "If you are looking for a well-executed mystery, this one has all the elements, but is more of a guided tour than a 'whodunit.' Some will be disappointed by this; I was. That's why Vanishing Investigator gets only a qualified recommendation. With a little more work, this could have been really good."

== Reviews ==
- Dragon #91 (Nov., 1984)
