= Termination: 1456 =

Role-playing game supplement

Cover art by Mitch O'Connell, 1984

Termination: 1456 is an adventure published by FASA in 1984 for the science fiction role-playing game Star Trek: The Role Playing Game, based on Star Trek: The Next Generation.

== Plot summary ==
Termination: 1456 is an adventure intended for Klingon player characters. The characters are ordered to assassinate a Thought Admiral who is suspected of plotting against the Emperor. Once the gamemaster has given the players this order, there is no more prepared plotline; the players must decide how to proceed.

== Publication history ==
Termination: 1456 is a 48-page book with a cardstock card that was written by Dale L. Kemper, with illustrations by Norman Miller and cover art by Mitch O'Connell. It was published by FASA in 1985.

== Reception ==
In the February 1986 edition of White Dwarf (Issue #74), John Grandidge called this adventure "very different from the approach of other Star Trek adventures [...] This is quite the most free-form adventure I have seen presented commercially and at first sight is a daunting prospect to run." Grandidge found "the basic plot is believable and interesting." He concluded by giving the book a perfect overall rating of 10 out of 10, saying, "For the remarkably high overall marks below I have chosen to ignore the ridiculous prices of these adventures in order to emphasise the quality of the plots [...] and the encouragement to backstab and bicker in Termination are perfectly faithful to the essence of Star Trek."
