= Elric! Gamemaster Screen =

Supplement for the fantasy RPG Elric!

- Designers: Gustaf Bjørksten; Les Brooks; Richard Watts
- Illustrators: William Church
- Publishers: Chaosium
- Publication: 1994
- Genres: Fantasy

Elric! Gamemaster Screen is a supplement published by Chaosium in 1994 for the fantasy role-playing game Elric! that is based on the series of novels by Michael Moorcock about the character Elric of Melniboné.

== Contents ==
Elric! Gamemaster Screen is a package of supplementary game material that includes:

- a four-panel gamemaster's screen that lists terrain modifiers, combat tables and other information that might be needed by the gamemaster
- a bookmark bearing a portrait of Stormbringer on one side, and a summary of the core rulebook on the reverse.
- four reference cards on cardstock detailing important game systems rules
- a large black and white map of the Young Kingdoms
- a 16-page booklet written by Les Brooks, Richard Watts and Gustav Bjorksten that contains
  - A list of the contents
  - A short an adventure called "The Curse of Chardros"
  - a small map of the Young Kingdoms
  - blank character sheets

== Publication history ==
Chaosium's first role-playing game about Michael Moorcock's world of Elric of Melniboné was Stormbringer, published in 1981. This was followed over the next six years by four revised editions. The early 1990s saw the rise of role-playing games with newer rules systems such as Vampire: The Masquerade and Amber Diceless Roleplaying Game. In an effort to keep up, Chaosium produced a 5th edition in 1993 retitled Elric! to differentiate it from the decade-old Stormbringer. The following year, Chaosium released the Elric! Gamemaster Screen, a supplement designed by Gustaf Bjørksten, Les Brooks and Richard Watts, with illustrations and cartography by William Church.

== Reception ==
In the October 1994 edition of Dragon (Issue #210), Rick Swan liked the included adventure, calling it "a first-rate mini-adventure set in the Isle of the Purple Towns." But Swan questioned the relatively high price ($15) versus the usefulness of the material, and asked, "Do you need it? Only if the price doesn't scare you away."

In Issue 10 of FreeINT, André Jarosch was not impressed, calling this "The usual GM screen nonsense that hardly any role-playing game spares: a screen, all the important tables and lists printed on colored cardboard sheets, blank character sheets, a map, and, the only reason it might still be interesting to own, a scenario ('The Curse of Chardros')."

== Other recognition ==
A copy of the Elric Gamemaster Screen is held in the Edwin and Terry Murray Collection of Role-Playing Games at Duke University Libraries (Container volume 253).
