= The Romulans =

Tabletop role-playing game supplement

- Publisher: FASA
- Publication date: 1984

The Romulans is a 1984 role-playing game supplement for Star Trek: The Role Playing Game published by FASA.

== Contents ==
The Romulans is a supplement which includes two books: The Star Fleet Intelligence Manual is a guide to the history and culture of the Romulan people, and the Game Operations Manual contains data relating to Romulan worlds and rules for creating Romulan player characters.

== Reception ==
R Jarnor reviewed The Romulans for White Dwarf #65, giving it an overall rating of 8 out of 10, and stated that "All in all if you want to run Romulan characters or a Romulan campaign, then this is for you. My only reservation is that for the money I would expect a little more in the way of details on subjects such as ships, worlds, etc."

Bob Mosley III reviewed The Romulans in Space Gamer No. 75. Mosley commented that "although The Romulans is a helpful addition to ST – RPG, it pales when placed alongside its Klingon counterpart. Had FASA spent more time on developing background material, this would have been a better supplement. still, it's a fair source of background material for the GM who wants to run a Federation campaign in Romulan territory."

K.L. Campbell-Robson reviewed The Romulans for Different Worlds magazine and stated that "All in all this is an excellent system and FASA proves that someone cares about the 'bad guys.' I say it's about time."

== Reviews ==
- Dragon #136 (Aug., 1988)
