= Orion Ruse =

Tabletop role-playing game supplement

Orion Ruse is a 1984 role-playing game adventure for Star Trek: The Role Playing Game published by FASA.

== Plot summary ==
Orion Ruse is an adventure set on the Orion trade planet of Daros IV, in which the player characters seek to obtain a profitable contract from a wealthy family of traders.

== Reception ==
Craig Sheeley reviewed Orion Ruse in Space Gamer No. 72. Sheeley commented that "If you like split-team adventures, if you want to get out of the starship combat/space adventure rut, if you really like to confuse and bamboozle your players, or if you'd like to get a playing group of Star Fleet personnel together with a playing group of merchants, then buy Orion Ruse."

R Jarnor reviewed Orion Ruse for White Dwarf #65, giving it an overall rating of 9 out of 10, and stated that "All in all it is pretty comprehensive, but nevertheless you will need to ad lib at various times."
