= Demand of Honor =

1984 role-playing game adventure

Demand of Honor is a 1984 role-playing game adventure for Star Trek: The Role Playing Game published by FASA.

== Plot summary ==
Demand of Honor is an adventure module that takes place during the initial five-year mission of the U.S.S. Enterprise, in which Starfleet tries to prevent Gorn pirates from attacking Federation shipping.

== Reception ==
Bob Mosley III reviewed Demand of Honor in Space Gamer No. 75. Mosley commented that "Depending on what kind of players the GM is working with, this could either be a single afternoon adventure or the beginning of a galactic war campaign. On the same note, it's up to the GM to do whatever possible to guide the players to a solution that won't produce a war – that is, unless the GM wants a war with the Gorns. If that is the case, then this is the perfect module to start it off."
