= Universe Gamemaster's Screen and System, World, and Environ Logs =

Role-playing game supplement

Universe Gamemaster's Screen and System, World, and Environ Logs is a 1981 role-playing game supplement published by SPI for Universe.

== Contents ==
Universe Gamemaster's Screen and System, World, and Environ Logs is a package including a 96-page logbook with logs for four star systems to map the worlds in them, 112 logs for individual planets and 12 logs to map the environments of the specific areas of a world.

Gamemaster's Screen and System, World, and Environ Logs is a GM's screen and a book of blank logs.

== Publication history ==
Gamemaster's Screen and System, World, and Environ Logs was designed by John H. Butterfield, and was published by Simulations Publications, Inc. in 1981 as a cardstock screen with a 96-page book.

== Reception ==
William A. Barton reviewed Universe Gamemaster's Screen and System, World, and Environ Logs in The Space Gamer No. 48. Barton commented that "if you don't have enough photocopies of the logs – or just want some connected in a book – and can't stand the thought of using anything but a Universe screen for Universe (and the [...] price tag doesn't deter you), you might find this accessory of some value."
