= Romulan Ship Recognition Manual =

Romulan Ship Recognition Manual is a 1985 role-playing game supplement published by FASA for Star Trek: The Role Playing Game.

== Contents ==
Romulan Ship Recognition Manual is a supplement in which statistics, plans, and illustrations of common Romulan starships are provided, including a foldout silhouette sheet and timelines showing the active service periods of various ship classes.

== Publication history ==
Romulan Ship Recognition Manual was written by Forest G. Brown with a cover by Dana Knutson and published by FASA in 1985 as a 48-page book with a cardstock card. A second edition was published that same year with a purple border on the cover.

== Reviews ==
- Comics Feature #45
- The VIP of Gaming (Issue 3 - Apr 1986)
