= U.S.S. Enterprise Deck Plans =

Tabletop role-playing game supplement

U.S.S. Enterprise Deck Plans is a 1983 role-playing game supplement for Star Trek: The Role Playing Game published by FASA.

== Contents ==
U.S.S. Enterprise Deck Plans is a boxed set containing a 12-page handbook, and nine double-sided sheets presenting 15mm-scale deck plans for the U.S.S. Enterprise.

== Reception ==
Steve List reviewed Star Trek 15 mm Deck Plans: USS Enterprise in Ares Magazine #16 and commented that "These plans are of use only to players who find they cannot live with the smaller grid versions supplied with the game. Although handsome enough in their own right, these two items are hardly vital to play of the game."

William Barton reviewed U.S.S. Enterprise Deck Plans in Space Gamer No. 68. Barton commented that "Once FASA's basic starter set of ST:TRPG is released (containing the rules and omitting the deck plans), the 15mm U.S.S. Enterprise Deck Plans should prove to be of greater value to more Trek players and GMs. Until then, however, if you can manage the extra price, I doubt you'll be disappointed if you go ahead and purchase them anyway. Especially if you enjoy shipboard actions, at least one member of your ST gaming group should own this set."

== Reviews ==
- Analog Science Fiction and Fact
