= Gamma World Referee's Screen and Mini-Module =

Role-playing game supplement

Gamma World Referee's Screen and Mini-Module is a 1982 role-playing game supplement for Gamma World published by TSR.

== Contents ==
Gamma World Referee's Screen and Mini-Module is a package including a gamemaster's screen and a short adventure scenario called "The Albuquerque Starport".

Gamma World Referee's Screen and Mini-Module is a GM's screen with a miniscenario ("The Albuquerque Starport") that describes an ancient ruined starport and the space station in orbit above it. The 1st ed. is for 1st-ed. rules; the 2nd ed. is for 2nd-ed. rules.

== Publication history ==
Gamma World Referee's Screen and Mini-Module was designed by Paul Reiche III, with a cover by Erol Otus (1st ed.) or Keith Parkinson (2nd ed.), and was published by TSR in 1981 as a cardstock screen with a 16-page booklet. A second edition was published in 1983 as a cardstock screen with an 8-page booklet.

== Reception ==
William A. Barton reviewed Gamma World Referee's Screen and Mini-Module in The Space Gamer No. 51. Barton commented that "the Gamma World Referee's Screen and Mini-Module is a good idea that was too long in coming."

Chris Baylis reviewed Gamemasters Screen for Imagine magazine, and stated that "The Albuquerque Starport is far from being the most exciting Gamma World scenario that you will ever be involved in, but by releasing it as an 'extra' with the GM Screen, TSR are at last showing some respect and attention to a system they seemed to have lost all interest in."
