= Star Trek III Sourcebook Update =

Tabletop role-playing game supplement

Star Trek III Sourcebook Update is a 1984 role-playing game supplement for Star Trek: The Role Playing Game published by FASA.

== Contents ==
Star Trek III Sourcebook Update is a supplement which incorporates the changes to the game setting resulting from the events of the first three Star Trek films.

== Reception ==
William A. Barton reviewed Star Trek III Sourcebook Update in Space Gamer No. 70. Barton commented that "ST:RPG players who enjoy the movies as much as (or more than) the series will find this supplement an excellent addition to the game, and even those who intend to keep their campaigns set in the time of the TV series can find enough useful data here to make this a most worthwhile Trek purchase."

Frederick Paul Kiesche III reviewed Star Trek III Sourcebook Update for Different Worlds magazine and stated that "Overall, this supplement is an excellent job and something that was long needed for the game. The text is clearly written, the diagrams and pictures are beautiful, the adventure is clearly in the spirit of the series and movies. More! More!"
