= New Beginnings (Dragonlance) =

D&D module

- Code: DLS1
- Campaign setting: Dragonlance
- Authors: Mark Acres

New Beginnings is an adventure for the 2nd edition of the Advanced Dungeons & Dragons (AD&D) fantasy role-playing game.

== Contents ==
This product is designed to introduce players to the Taladas campaign in the Dragonlance setting. First is a step-by-step walkthrough of AD&D game character design, with tips on effective game play and role-playing. Next are semi-solitaire, word-problem training exercises designed to familiarize the reader with the AD&D 2nd Edition rules. The exercises cover things like apparent AC vs. AC with dexterity modifiers, optional initiative modifiers, specialist weapons, wall climbing, and trap removal, and they also present moral problems.

A short adventure completes this introductory package.

== Publication history ==
DLS1 New Beginnings was designed by Mark Acres with editing by Michael Stern, and was published by TSR, Inc. as a 32-page module.

== Reception ==
Ken Rolston reviewed New Beginnings for Dragon magazine #171 (July 1991). He called this adventure "an unfortunate case of the designer doing all the right things, yet ending up with a not very appealing package". Although he initially didn't appreciate the "school-like exercises", Rolston actually found them "quite instructive" because he realized how little he knew about the AD&D 2nd Edition rules. He commented: "The character-creation walk-through, the how-to-role-play essay, and the exercises are well designed and effective, given their purpose to introduce new players to the AD&D game systems. Though they didn't look like much fun to me, they worked like they were supposed to." Regarding the short adventure found in the New Beginnings package, he commented that "in terms of appealing to the visual, dramatic, or tactical senses of the [Dungeon Master] or players, this isn't particularly exciting or well presented". He concluded the review by saying: "New Beginnings does just what it ought to do, and it endeavors more or less successfully to be entertaining and inspiring in the process. Its greatest limitation is that it is specifically designed to introduce players to the Taladas campaign in the Dragonlance setting, and it isn't suited for introducing players to any other AD&D campaign setting. However, the role-playing tips and rules exercises would be quite useful for any first-time AD&D game player or [Dungeon Master]. And if you're going to start a Taladas campaign, this is a very valuable training tool and resource for your players."
