= Federation Ship Recognition Manual =

Federation Ship Recognition Manual is a 1985 role-playing game supplement published by FASA for Star Trek: The Role Playing Game.

== Contents ==
Federation Ship Recognition Manual is a supplement in which statistics, plans, and illustrations of common Federation starships are provided, along with a foldout silhouette sheet and timelines showing the active service periods of various ship classes.

== Publication history ==
Federation Ship Recognition Manual was written by Forest G. Brown and published by FASA in 1985 as a 44-page book with a cardstock card.

== Reviews ==
- Comics Feature #45
