= Star Trek Ship Construction Manual =

Tabletop role-playing game supplement

Star Trek Ship Construction Manual is a 1983 role-playing game supplement for Star Trek: The Role Playing Game published by FASA.

== Contents ==
Star Trek Ship Construction Manual is a supplement to aid with designing ships for starfaring races including the Federation, the Klingons, the Romulans, the Tholians, the Gorn, and the Orions.

== Reception ==
William A. Barton reviewed Star Trek Ship Construction Manual in Space Gamer No. 70. Barton commented that "the ST Ship Construction Manual is quite well thought out, and more than adequate for building ships form the smallest scouts all the way up to the revamped Enterprise of The Wrath of Khan. The clean simplicity of its design, emphasizing playability over needless complexity, could be used as a model by future designers of roleplaying starship manuals."

== Reviews ==
- Comics Feature #45
