= Klingon Ship Recognition Manual =

Klingon Ship Recognition Manual is a 1985 role-playing game supplement published by FASA for Star Trek: The Role Playing Game.

== Contents ==
Klingon Ship Recognition Manual is a supplement in which statistics, plans, and illustrations of common Klingon starships are provided, including a silhouette sheet and timelines showing the active service periods of different ship classes.

== Publication history ==
Klingon Ship Recognition Manual was written by Forest G. Brown with a cover by Dana Knutson and published by FASA in 1985 as a 48-page book with a cardstock card.

== Reviews ==
- Comics Feature #45
