= Klingon D-7 Battlecruiser Deck Plans =

Tabletop role-playing game supplement

Klingon D-7 Battlecruiser Deck Plans is a 1983 role-playing game supplement for Star Trek: The Role Playing Game published by FASA.

== Contents ==
Klingon D-7 Battlecruiser Deck Plans is a boxed set containing six 15mm-scale deck plans for a Klingon ship that are roughly double the size as the plan which came with the game.

== Reception ==
Steve List reviewed Star Trek 15 mm Deck Plans: Klingon D-7 Battlecruiser in Ares Magazine #16 and commented that "These plans are of use only to players who find they cannot live with the smaller grid versions supplied with the game. Although handsome enough in their own right, these two items are hardly vital to play of the game."

William A. Barton reviewed Klingon D-7 Battlecruiser Deck Plans in Space Gamer No. 70. Barton commented that "With the recent release of the Klingons supplement for ST:RPG and of a basic set minus the deck plans, the 15mm Klingon D-7 Battlecruiser Deck Plans prove to be a better value for ST players and GMs than they are even in their own right. Still, if you can afford them now, they are quite nice."

== Reviews ==
- Analog Science Fiction and Fact
