= Lycanthropes (Chill) =

Lycanthropes is a 1991 role-playing game supplement published by Mayfair Games for Chill.

== Contents ==
Lycanthropes is a sourcebook detailing lycanthropy for the Chill system. Its author is Geoff Pass.

== Reviews ==
- Dragon #186
