= Graduation Exercise (Star Trek: The Role Playing Game) =

Graduation Exercise is a 1985 role-playing game adventure published by FASA for Star Trek: The Role Playing Game.

== Plot summary ==
Graduation Exercise is an adventure in which Klingon cadet player characters must escort an Imperial agent off a planet in the Triangle while thwarting Romulan interference.

== Publication history ==
Graduation Exercise was written by Bernard Edward Menke and Rick David Stuart, with a cover by David R. Deitrick and published by FASA in 1985 as a 40-page book with a cardstock card.

== Reviews ==
- Comics Feature #45
