= Death in Spades =

Tabletop role-playing game adventure

Death in Spades is a 1983 role-playing game adventure for Gangbusters published by TSR.

== Contents ==
Death in Spades is a murder mystery adventure in which the player characters must solve a series of murders that happened in the dinner club that used to be the Oberklein Mansion.

== Reception ==
Jerry Epperson reviewed Death in Spades in Space Gamer No. 70. Epperson commented that "Death in Spades is an interesting adventure and a great idea. However, it only gets a qualified recommendation; it has a bit too much 'divine intervention' to be completely plausible. With a little sweat, the Judge should be able to salvage most of it for use in a campaign. Those not wishing to deal with the prospects of rewriting some of the encounters would be better off leaving this card unturned."
