= Ship Recognition Manual: The Klingon Empire =

Role-playing game supplement

Ship Recognition Manual: The Klingon Empire is a 1983 role-playing game supplement for Star Trek: The Role Playing Game published by FASA.

== Contents ==
Ship Recognition Manual: The Klingon Empire supplement detailing the most often encountered Klingon Empire ships.

== Reception ==
Frederick Paul Kiesche III reviewed Ship Recognition Manual: The Klingon Empire in Space Gamer No. 68. Kiesche commented that "Complaints? I have none. Well, true, I would have liked to have seen more ships for the price, but the artwork made up for that. I am happy to see the people at Fantasimulations Associates and FASA expanding the Star Trek universe."

William A. Barton reviewed Ship Recognition Manual: The Klingon Empire and Ship Recognition Manual: The Federation for Different Worlds magazine and stated that "Overall, the Ship Recognition Manual series should prove quite useful for Star Trek players and gamemasters if future offerings follow the pattern established for The Klingon Empire and The Federation volumes. They are welcome additions to the Star Trek universe, and I feel confident in recommending them as such."
