= Gangbusters (role-playing game) =

1982 Prohibition-era role-playing game

- 2nd edition (cover art by Jim Holloway), mistakenly labelled "New 3rd Edition"
- Designers: Rick Krebs and Mark Acres
- Publishers: TSR
- Publication: 1982 (1st edition); 1990 (3rd edition); 2019 (B/X edition)
- Genres: Historical
- Systems: percentile

Gangbusters is a roleplaying game published by TSR, Inc. in 1982 that emulates gang crime in the 1920s during American Prohibition.

== Description ==
Gangbusters is set in the 1920s in the fictional Lakefront City located on the western shore of Lake Michigan, analogous to Chicago. Players take the roles of criminals, law enforcement professionals, or other characters (such as newspaper reporters) who investigate or oppose criminals. An emphasis is placed on the violent growth of organized crime during Prohibition. Political corruption is also a recurring theme.

== Rules system ==
During character generation, a player randomly generates his character's abilities (such as Muscle and Luck), then chooses a career (character class) from Criminal, FBI Agent, Newspaper Reporter, Police Officer, Private Investigator, or Prohibition Agent. Each career includes a unique set of advantages and disadvantages. The player then further customizes the character by adding non-career skills, such as Auto Theft or Photography.

Gangbusters uses a percentile-based mechanic for most task resolutions using two ten-sided dice. The basic chances of a character succeeding at an action are equal to the character's score in a relevant ability or skill, subject to modifiers assigned by the Judge. The player of that character then rolls percentile dice to determine if the character succeeded. The results of actions (such as the damage caused by weapons or the amount of money produced by a criminal enterprise) may be determined by further dice rolls.

== Publication history ==
Game designer Rick Krebs created a game of gangland violence set in the age of speakeasies titled Bloody 20s and sold the concept to TSR. Mark Acres assisted to develop the new game retitled Gangbusters, which was published in 1982.(ISBN 978-0-394-52597-6) The boxed set contained a 64-page rulebook, a 16-page sample adventure, a game map showing several blocks of Lakefront City, some cardboard counters, and two ten-sided dice.

Between 1982 and 1984, TSR published five adventure modules for Gangbusters:

- Trouble Brewing by Tom Moldvay (ISBN 978-0-935696-84-4)
- Murder in Harmony by Mark Acres (ISBN 978-0-935696-85-1)
- Death on the Docks by Mark Acres (ISBN 978-0-88038-013-3)
- The Vanishing Investigator by Tracy Hickman (ISBN 978-0-88038-045-4)
- Death in Spades by Tracy Hickman (ISBN 978-0-39454-014-6)

Three packs of Gangbusters miniatures were also produced by TSR.

In 1990, TSR released a second edition of the Gangbusters rules, but mislabeled it as a "New 3rd Edition" (ISBN 978-0-88038-975-4). The 3rd Edition (as it came to be known) is a 128-page softcover book combining the text of the first edition rule book with information taken from the adventures Trouble Brewing, Murder in Harmony and Death on The Docks. Except for minor edits, the 3rd Edition Gangbusters game mechanics are indistinguishable from those of the original edition.

In 2019, Mark Hunt, with permission of original designer Rick Krebs, released an updated and simplified version of the rules known as the "B/X" edition, because it was based on the game mechanics of the 1980 Dungeons & Dragons Basic and EXpert sets.

== Reception ==
In Issue 19 of the French games magazine Jeux & Stratégie, Michel Brassinne liked the less complex rules, writing, "All game procedures have been simplified without diminishing the interest of the game. It foreshadows the new generation of role-playing games." Brassine liked the then-novel idea that "The characters act in parallel as if they lived in the same city but without necessarily knowing each other. Thus each player indicates in writing their character's schedule for a week and gives it to the game leader. Woe to the gangster who is preparing to commit a hold-up on Wednesday at 3 p.m. on Maxwell Street if a detective, the same day, decides to monitor the area around the bank." Brassine concluded by giving the game high marks of 9 out of 10 for Presentation, 8 out of 10 for Clarity of Rules, 9 out of 10 for Originality, and the highest rating for Likeability.

Ken Rolston reviewed Gangbusters for Different Worlds magazine and stated that "Gangbusters is [...] a worthwhile purchase, if only as a model of good game design. Whether you buy it just to read the rules, or to develop a campaign, you will be pleased with your purchase of Gangbusters. The product is a credit to Mark Acres and the TSR design staff, and I hope we'll see more games of equal quality coming from them in the future."

In his 1990 book The Complete Guide to Role-Playing Games, game critic Rick Swan thought this game was "an overlooked gem, a minor classic." Swan liked the simplicity of the rules, writing, "Emphasizing action and adventure over rules and formulas, Gangbusters may not be the most realistic treatment of the era, but it's certainly the most fun." Swan concluded by giving the game a rating of 3 out of 4, saying, "Gangbusters lacks the depth for an extended campaign, but it's a great way to spend an evening."

In a retrospective review of Gangbusters in Black Gate, Ty Johnston said "If you're looking to try something different at your gaming table but don't want the hassle of having to learn the rules for a long, complicated system, you should check out one of the versions of Gangbusters. I predict you'll have a blast."
