= The Vanished (Star Trek: The Role Playing Game) =

Role-playing game adventure

The Vanished is a 1983 role-playing game adventure for Star Trek: The Role Playing Game published by FASA.

== Plot summary ==
The Vanished is an adventure in which the Enterprise receives a transmission from Federation Deepspace Research Facility 39 which is cut off and the station does not respond to repeated attempts at communication.

== Publication history ==
The Vanished is the first complete adventure published by FASA for Star Trek: The Role Playing Game.

== Reception ==
William A. Barton reviewed The Vanished in Space Gamer No. 70. Barton commented that "The Vanished could provide a good evening's entertainment for your ST play group – and the Deepspace Facility plans could suggest many more to a clever GM."

Frederick Paul Kiesche III reviewed The Vanished for Different Worlds magazine and stated that "All in all, Messrs. McLimore and Poehlein did a fine job on The Vanished. In fact, I would say that this adventure could stand with the best of the original television episodes, although it probably would have given the producers headaches to build FDR#39! Only one problem cropped up-there are several glaring typographical errors in the adventure booklet. FASA should definitely take better pains to ensure accurate copy; what is the sense of keeping a publishing deadline if nobody will be able to understand what you have printed? Other than that, a fine job. I look forward to seeing more work from these gentlemen."
