= Star Ace =

Science fiction tabletop role-playing game

Star Ace is a science fiction role-playing game published by Pacesetter Ltd in 1984 in which players take on the roles of rebel pilots fighting against an evil empire.

== Description ==
Star Ace is a science-fiction system in which players create rookie pilot characters. Characters increase their skills (and notoriety), and increase their standing from Rookie eventually to Ace.

The rules are simple; most actions are resolved by checking against a single multi-purpose table. Player characters are Star Aces, interstellar outlaws who oppose the Empire. The game includes a rulebook (64 pages), a campaign setting, the "Wilderness Briefing Manual" (32 pages), an introductory scenario "Deuces Wild" (16 pages), a star map, and counters. The game is compatible with Chill and Time Master.

== Publication history ==
Star Ace was designed by Mark Acres and Gali Sanchez, and was published by Pacesetter Ltd in 1984 as a boxed set that included a 64-page book, a 32-page book, and a 16-page book, a large color map, a cardstock counter sheet, and dice.

Chill, Time Master, and Star Ace were all built around the same house system and were all released by Pacesetter within a year.

== Game supplements and adventures ==
- Campaign Master's Screen with Ace in the Hole (1984)
- Goodbye, Kankee (1984)
- Aliens (1985)
- First Strike on Paradise (1985)
- The Gemini Conspiracy (1985)
- Lightspeed Raid (1985)

== Reception ==
In Issue 67 of White Dwarf (July 1985), Marcus L. Rowland didn't like the game, commenting, "All in al1, a dull and uninspiring game and I think that Pacesetter should have tried to develop something completely new, rather than re-hashing old themes and producing a disappointing result." Rowland concluded by giving the game a poor rating of 5 out of 10.

In Issue 75 of Space Gamer (July-August 1985), Warren Spector gave a positive review, saying, "if I could buy just one Pacesetter game – and maybe even just one science fiction game – Star Ace would be the one. It's flawed, but utterly charming – a 'Golly-gosh gee-whiz, Captain Terrific!' sort of game. and what the heck, you'll hear the sound of lasers roaring through the vacuum of outer space as flaming engines propel you at speeds far greater than that of light. So it ain't science." Spector commented that

In his 1990 book The Complete Guide to Role-Playing Games, game critic Rick Swan was not impressed by the complete lack of science in the game, saying, "Star Ace is a toddler's-eye view of science fiction, where common sense is about as relevant as it is in Alice in Wonderland. While swashbuckling adventurers and drooling green monsters abound, the laws of physics are nowhere in sight." Swan found the rules easy to learn, "but not particularly conducive to role-playing, because PCs advance more quickly as a result of violent encounters than from interacting with other characters." Swan concluded by giving this game a poor rating of only 2 out of 4.

In his 1991 book Heroic Worlds, Lawrence Schick suggested that the game was greatly inspired by the Star Wars movies. and described it as "heavy on the fiction (dramatic role-playing) and light on the science."
