= Darklords =

Dungeons & Dragons supplement

- Genre: Role-playing games
- Publisher: TSR
- Publication date: 1991

Darklords is an accessory for the 2nd edition of the Advanced Dungeons & Dragons fantasy role-playing game, published in 1991.

== Contents ==
The supplement focuses on "sixteen different Darklords spread out over thirteen chapters". The Darklords are:

- Ankhtepot, a mummy
- Tristessa, a drow banshee
- Bluebeard
- Ebonbane, a living evil sword
- The Three Hags
- The Headless Horseman
- The House of Lament, an evil living house
- Von Kharkov, a panther who was polymorphed into a person and subsequently turned into a vampire
- Merilee, a child vampire
- Captain Alan Monette, a werebat pirate
- The Phantom Lover, an incubus
- Marquis Stezen d'Polarno, who drains the souls of victims through a cursed portrait painting
- Tiyet, a mummy who doesn't appear as undead
- Zolnik, a Loup de Noir werewolf

According to Gene Alloway, the character and background of each Darklord is well-developed, with "appearance, background, current sketch, the domain of the particular Darklord, and a section on confronting the entity" as well as other details included.

== Publication history ==
RR1: Darklords is a 96-page Ravenloft accessory book published in 1991 for $10.95. It was written by Andria Hayday "with some additional design by William W. Connors, Bruce Nesmith, and James Lowder". The cover art featuring a "dagger-wielding lich" is by Tim Hildebrandt, while the interior artwork is by Stephen Fabian. David C. Sutherland III created the maps with 3D infrastructure views. In 2013, it was rereleased as a PDF on the DNDClassics website for $9.99.

== Reception ==
Gene Alloway reviewed Darklords in the May/June 1992 issue of White Wolf Magazine. He rated the sourcebook a 4 out of 5 overall, stating it as a "must for a Ravenloft campaign". Alloway also stated that "It is a well-made and designed product, and one that has usefulness outside of Ravenloft and Advanced Dungeons & Dragons itself."

The supplement was also reviewed in Windgeflüster #20 (November 1992).

Alex Lucard, for DieHard GameFan, reviewed the PDF edition in 2013. On the various Darklords, Lucard stated, "I’m not happy with four of the sixteen, but that means there’s a 75% quality ratio here and that’s pretty darn good. As well, Darklords is a must own for anyone even casually interested in Ravenloft to see just how much depth and detail was put into even a C-level minor lord of the Dark Domain". On the digital edition, he wrote, "this PDF rerelease is a bit pricey consider the physical copy was only a dollar more back in 1991, but D&D PDFs do tend to be a bit overpriced compared to their contemporaries. If you don’t already own a copy of Darklords, I would still strongly recommend the PDF version at this price as it’s very well done, but you might want to check Ebay for a physical copy first as you can undoubtedly get it cheaper".

Kevin Kulp, game designer, highlighted that "a notable aspect of this book is that most of the darklords aren't particularly powerful, even by 2nd edition AD&D standards. [...] That makes this book useful as a low-level supplement, and significantly expands its utility. It's also a nice reminder that just because someone is evil and despicable, they aren't necessarily particularly tough or good at combat. They may have other abilities, assets, or assistance".
