= Star Trek: The Next Generation Officer's Manual =

Star Trek Role-Playing game rule supplement

Cover art, 1988

Star Trek: The Next Generation Officer's Manual is a supplement published by FASA in 1988 for Star Trek: The Role Playing Game to update game material following the premiere of the new television series Star Trek: The Next Generation. However Paramount Pictures did not feel FASA's new material matched the ethos of the new series, and pulled FASA's license to produce Star Trek material the following year.

== Contents ==
Up until 1987, FASA's popular Star Trek: The Role Playing Game was based on the original Star Trek television series and movies produced up to that time. The television series Star Trek: The Next Generation first aired in September 1987, and provided many updates to the original Star Trek, including new uniforms, alien races, weapons, technology and a new appearance for Klingons.

Star Trek: The Next Generation Officer's Manual is a supplement that adds material from Star Trek: The Next Generation to the role-playing game, with details on the Federation and Starfleet relevant to the time period of the series.

== Publication history ==
Star Trek: The Next Generation Officer's Manual was written by Rick Stuart and John Terra, and was published by FASA Corp. in 1988 as a 144-page book.

Shannon Appelcline explains that "Star Trek [the role-playing game] had been doing well — with 1985 and 1986 being banner years for the product line. However in 1987 something happened to shake up FASA's franchise: Star Trek: The Next Generation (1987–1994) came on the air. For the first time since FASA had started publishing the Star Trek RPG, there were new Star Trek shows airing regularly. FASA slowed down their production of material set in the classic period, but that was soon balanced by new material for The Next Generation, including an Officer's Manual (1988) and First Year Sourcebook (1989). Unfortunately, the new show also made Paramount much pickier about what was being published, and they weren't entirely happy with FASA's two Next Generation supplements, which they felt didn't match their view of the Next Generation universe. In 1989 Paramount pulled FASA's license for Star Trek."

== Reception ==
In Issue 10 of Gateways, James Petrassi commented, "With a little work on the part of the GM and the players, a campaign set in such a milieu would provide all involved with much fun and enjoyment, to be shared by all."

Stewart Wieck reviewed Star Trek, The Next Generation, Officer's Manual in White Wolf #13 (December 1988) and stated that "the book is very comprehensive. The book has been prepared in such a fashion that it would be enjoyable to a Trekkie even if he were unfamiliar with the Star Trek RPG. But if you do play the game and have any interest at all in establishing a new campaign in a new time, then you need to have this book."

In the August 1989 edition of Dragon (Issue 148), Jim Bambra gave a recommendation for this book, saying, "Updating the Star Trek game to include information from the new television series is made easy with this book, and devourers of trivia will be kept pleasantly engaged."
