= Chill: Black Morn Manor =

Board game

Chill: Black Morn Manor is a 1985 board game published by Pacesetter Ltd.

== Gameplay ==
Chill: Black Morn Manor is a horror boardgame in which the players assemble the board as they play, and will face one of ten different possible creatures.

== Publication history ==
Black Morn Manor was designed by Troy Denning.

== Reception ==
Paul Mason reviewed Chill: Black Morn Manor for White Dwarf #69, giving it an overall rating of 8 out of 10, and stated that "A little more explanation, with examples, would have been particularly useful. Still, the game involved a fair measure of strategy, particularly in the placing of tiles."

Matt Williams reviewed Black Morn Manor for Imagine magazine, and stated that "The rules, only four sides long, are written with a dry, black humour. However they are not as clear as they are concise. The order of card play Is ill-explained, with the rules contradicting instructions on most cards. Further, as the rules stand, the haunted room may never enter play; thus the game may last forever. Both these points have intuitive solutions, but mar what is otherwise an enjoyable game."

Kevin Ross reviewed Chill: Black Morn Manor in Space Gamer No. 76. Ross commented that "This is a tough genre to work in, especially in the area of boardgames [...] Pacesetter has done a pretty reasonable job with Black Morn Manor, and so far it appears to be the best of the horror boardgames."

Larry DiTillio reviewed Black Morn Manor for Different Worlds magazine and stated that "In summation Black Morn Manor is a nifty fast-moving game, nice for a quick evening's entertainment. Its horror milieu might not be to every gamer's taste, and its unusual strategies may take a few games to master, but if you do enjoy a chill or two I think it's worth the effort."

== Reviews ==
- Casus Belli #39 (Aug 1987)
- Jeux & Stratégie #46
- 1985 Games 100
