= Rick Krebs =

American game designer

- Born: Richard S. Krebs; Reading, Pennsylvania, U.S.
- Education: Albright College
- Occupations: Role-playing game designer Simulation game designer

Richard S. "Rick" Krebs is a role-playing game and simulation game designer.

== Early life ==
Krebs' initial game design was in the early 1960s when he created simulation games using toothpicks, American plastic bricks, cardboard chits, bingo chips and the box-like design of his bed quilt (buildings). The periods covered by these rules began with medieval & fantasy knights, through gangster wars, and continued into modern warfare. His mother frequently commented that he used to get in trouble with the neighborhood kids, as Krebs was always changing or making up new rules.

Briefly, putting aside his toys and games, Krebs trained as a social/cultural/intellectual historian, and received a B.A. from Albright College in 1971. His senior thesis was on the biographer/journalist/historian, Burton J. Hendrick.

== Career ==
Rick Krebs is the original game designer for TSR, Inc.'s Gangbusters, a historical role-playing game set in the 1920s.

Krebs's professional involvement in the industry goes back to a fantasy fanzine Phanta Carta, and the first edition Advanced Dungeons & Dragons game, where he contributed to and is credited in the preface to the 1979 Advanced Dungeons & Dragons Dungeon Master's Guide. He also wrote the articles, "D&D meets the Electronic Age" and "Non-player characters Have Feelings Too" for Dragon magazine.

He founded and operated the original Gamer's Guild game store from 1977 to 1982. During this time created the Krebikoff Gambit for use in the Cosmic Encounter board game, designed a simplified rule set for space gaming with miniature figures, and rules for English Civil War military miniatures.

In the mid-1990s, he worked on the play-by-mail game ElderLords (based on his D&D campaign), promoted and designed adventures for the computer game Eamon adventures, created and programmed Radio Horse Racing, a computerized horse racing simulation, created the 'rainbow doozi' cyber creaturatons and refined several artificial intelligence computer games. Created and produced "Foam Wars" gaming system as well as "No Paint Armies" using "Granny Grate".

== Sources ==
- RPG Encyclopedia (G)
- Swan, Rick. The Complete Guide to Role-Playing Games (St Martin Press, 1990).
