= Grav-Ball =

Board game

Grav-Ball is a 1982 board game published by FASA.

== Gameplay ==
Grav-Ball is a board game involving a futuristic combat-sport in an anti-gravity arena, in which the armored players try to move a steel ball into the goal area.

== Publication history ==
The tactical combat system used for Grav-Ball, with battles taking place on a square grid, was adapted into the Star Trek: The Role Playing Game.

== Reception ==
Chris Smith reviewed Grav-Ball in The Space Gamer No. 60. Smith commented that "My conclusion is that this game is too expensive. With some work, this could be something special, but as it is, it isn't worth the price."

Ian Waddelow reviewed Grav-Ball for White Dwarf #42, giving it an overall rating of 8 out of 10, and stated that "For a game that promises so much, it is a shame it delivers so little. It simple does not do itself justice. The best recommendation is to forget world peace and bring back the wargames."

== Review ==
- Asimov's Science Fiction
