= Apparitions (Chill) =

Role-playing game supplement

Apparitions, published in 1991 by Mayfair Games, is a supplement for the horror role-playing game Chill.

== Plot summary ==
Apparitions is a 128-page softcover sourcebook for players and referees of Chill that contains information about malevolent spirits, haunts and hauntings, and also includes statistics for creatures, more profession templates, additional disciplines and an adventure scenario. The book sorts the entries into three broad categories:

- Departed Spirits (ghosts)
- Projections (benign spirits that only manifest to inform or warn)
- Independent Creatures of the Unknown (dangerous spirits that seek to harm or torment humans)

The book was designed by Philip Athans and edited by Jeff Leason, with graphic design by Mari Paz Cabardo, and illustrations and cover art by Joe DeVelasco.

== Reception ==
In the October 1992 edition of Dragon (Issue #186), Rick Swan found the book "consistently entertaining and filled with interesting material that is intelligently presented." He liked the graphic design, calling it "a sort of cross between a ransom note and an impressionist painting... as much fun to look at as to read." He thought the collection of more than two dozen creatures "a delightfully nasty bunch", and he enjoyed the "vivid descriptions", but was disappointed by the lack of illustrations. Swan also wanted "stronger scenarios and a few more adventure hooks," but concluded that "the fastidous research, evocative writing, and enthusiasm for the material makes for a winning combination."
