= Chill (role-playing game) =

Tabletop role-playing game

- Chill cover, Pacesetter Edition
- Designers: Gali Sanchez, Garry Spiegle, Mark Acres, Louis J. Prosperi, David Ladyman, Jeff R. Leason
- Publishers: Pacesetter Ltd, Mayfair Games, Growling Door Games, Salt Circle Games
- Publication: 1984 (Pacesetter Ltd); 1985 (Swedish version – Äventyrsspel); 1990 (Mayfair Games); 2015 (Growling Door Games)
- Genres: Horror
- Systems: Percentile based (d100)

Chill cover, Mayfair Edition

Chill is an investigative and modern horror role-playing game originally published by Pacesetter Ltd in 1984 that captures the feel of 20th-century horror films.

== Setting ==
Chill is inspired by, and attempts to capture the feel of, 20th-century horror films, where usual foes are vampires, werewolves, mummies, ghosts, and ghouls. Players take on the role of envoys, members of a secret organization known as S.A.V.E. (Societas Argenti Viae Eternitata, or, The Eternal Society of the Silver Way) that tracks down and eliminates evil in the world.

== Pacesetter (First Edition) ==
The game was introduced by Pacesetter Ltd in 1984. The following year, Target Games released a Swedish version under the name Chock (Swedish for "shock" or "fright"), and in 1985, Schmidt Spiele released a French version. Pacesetter also launched the board game Black Morn Manor, also translated into French (Le Manoir des Ténèbres) by Schmidt Spiele.

The game components include an introductory folio, a campaign book, a book of monsters, a map of the world, 140 die-cut double-sided counters, a range stick, and dice. The boxed set also includes a 16-page adventure, "Terror in Warwick House".

=== Chill Master's Screen ===
Chill Master's Screen

Chill Master's Screen is a supplement published by Pacesetter in 1984 for the game. The package includes an adventure based on Bram Stoker's classic novel Dracula. It is a three-panel gamemaster's screen printed on cardstock.

The screen is divided into three panels, decorated on the player side with three illustrations from the core book. On the gamemaster's side of the screen, the left part summarizes several rules points, the central part summarizes the monster disciplines, and the right part summarizes the resolution system and describes the effect of the different levels of success depending on the situation. The adventure book contains an 8-page scenario titled Castle Dracula, which adapts the four beginning chapters Bram Stoker's novel Dracula.

Several ex-TSR employees founded game company Pacesetter Ltd. in 1984, partly due to their unhappiness at the direction TSR seemed to be headed. One of their first products was the modern horror role-playing game Chill, and this was followed the same year by several accessories such as the Castle Dracula / Chill Master's Screen, a product designed by Gail Sanchez, with a cover by Susan Collins.

In Issue 71 of Space Gamer, William A. Barton commented "the GM Screen should prove useful to most Chill CMs who like more than an ordinary binder to hide their notes, and the Castle Dracula adventure can be a fun – if potentially deadly – bonus for those times you can't get together an entire play group." A copy of Chill Master's Screen is held in the collection of the Strong National Museum of Play (object 117.672).

=== Other Pacesetter publications ===
- Blood Moon Rising (adventure)
- Creature Feature (sourcebook)
- Death on Tour (adventure)
- Deathwatch on the Bayou (adventure)
- Evenings of Terror with Elvira (book of adventures hosted by Elvira, Mistress of the Dark)
- Haunter of the Moor (adventure)
- Highland Terror (adventure)
- Isle of the Dead (adventure)
- Things (sourcebook)
- Thutmose's Night (adventure)
- Vampires (sourcebook)
- Vengeance of Dracula (adventure, published as a sequel to Castle Dracula)
- Village of Twilight (adventure)

Pacesetter ceased operations in 1986, bringing the publication of the First Edition of Chill to an end.

=== Reception to First edition ===
In Issue 31 of Abyss, Dave Nalle called the rules well-organized. However Nalle thought the game was too focused on combat over role-playing. For this reason, Nalle did not think it would "hold much lasting interest for experienced players. The skill system is too limited and inflexible, and as gamers develop role-playing skills, they want to play characters with personality and use their imaginations." Nalle concluded, "In general, I'd recommend Chill with a few reservations."

In the October 1984 edition of Dragon (Issue 90), Jerry Epperson had a few quibbles with various game mechanics. He questioned the economics rules that essentially gave characters access to unlimited amounts of cash. Epperson also wondered why a range stick was included, since there were no regulated combat maneuvering rules that would make use of the stick. And he found the introductory adventure included in the game was overly simplistic: "Terror in Warwick House is much like a guided tour of a national monument. While it portends to be a dangerous place, one gets the feeling that those who fell victim to the sinister occupants before the player characters were called to the scene were either idiots or invalids. The clues required by the characters to dispose of the evil are practically spoon-fed to the players." But Epperson concluded that "these problems are not major flaws in the game’s design; any GM should be able to alter them with little effort. All things considered, the Chill game does just what it sets out to do. It doesn’t stall play with unwieldy rules or sub-systems, and it allows the GM to pace the storyline and preserve the intensity of a situation thanks to the game’s elegant simplicity. As an alternative to dungeon delving, superheroing, or chasing after Cthulhu, the Chill game is something you can really sink your teeth into."

Two reviews of Chill appeared in issues of Space Gamer. In the November–December 1984 edition (Issue No. 71), William Barton admired Chill for being less violent and less weird than other horror roleplaying games, saying, "Chill is a viable alternative in supernatural gaming for those who desire less gunplay than is typical in Stalking or prefer more conventional creatures than the sanity-blasting horrors of CoC." In the July–August 1985 edition (Issue 75), Warren Spector thought that "Though superficially simpler than Call of Cthulhu, the clear leader in the horror field, Chill falls somewhat short of the mark."

Keith Herber reviewed Chill for Different Worlds magazine and stated that "I found Chill to be a well-thought-out, well-presented game that simulates the world of horror as represented in (particularly) the movies. The rules are flexible enough and complete enough to allow a gamemaster to set whatever tone or mood he desires his campaign to have and there is a large amount of written and filmed material from which to draw adventure designs."

In the January 1985 edition of White Dwarf (Issue 61), Angus McLellan gave Chill an average rating of 7 out of 10. McLellan felt the gameplay was fairly slow and lacking in scares; furthermore, Call of Cthulhu had already paved the way for horror-based role-playing games.

Paul Mason reviewed Chill for Imagine magazine, and stated that "if you fancy a game of investigation with gothic horror overtones, and you don't much care for H P Lovecraft's Cthulhu mythos, then Chill would be the game to buy."

In the December 1988 edition of Dragon (Issue 140), Ken Rolston reviewed two supplements published by Pacesetter just before it went out of business, Vampires and Creature Feature. Rolston had a more favourable opinion of Vampires, calling it an "excellent book... The graphic presentation is top-notch." Rolston was particularly enthusiastic about the writing, which he called, "exceptional" and concluded, "I highly recommend this supplement." He was less enthusiastic about Creature Feature, saying, "This supplement lacks the graphic quality or refined presentation of the finer Chill supplements." Rolston thought the concept of allowing players to become monsters and prey on humans did have "an oddly redeeming appeal", but felt that "the replay value [is] negligible." He gave this supplement a thumbs down, saying, "Creature Feature will not be of use to most GMs, but students of the hobby may find it interesting for a brief diversion or as a curiosity."

In his 1990 book The Complete Guide to Role-Playing Games, game critic Rick Swan was not impressed by Chill, calling it "A horror game for the easily frightened." Swan could not find anything to like in the game system, commenting, "The feat rules are puzzling ... the combat rules are stiff ... and the economic system is ridiculous." Swan concluded by giving the game a below average rating of 2 out of 4, saying, "Chill is too shallow for extended campaigns, and lacks the depth to please anyone but the most undemanding players."

=== Other reviews and commentary ===
- The V.I.P. of Gaming Magazine #4 (July/Aug., 1986)
- Casus Belli #22 (Oct 1984)
- Casus Belli #23 (Dec 1984)
- Casus Belli #38 (June 1987)
- Asimov's Science Fiction v9 n9 (1985 09)
- Jeux & Stratégie #46

== Mayfair Games (Second Edition) ==
In 1990, Mayfair Games inc. purchased the rights, and the following year published a second edition of the game system called Chill Core Rulebook. Over the next three years, Mayfair published fourteen sourcebooks for the setting and a collection of short stories:

- Chill Accessory Pack (included Isle of the Dead scenario)
- Apparitions (sourcebook with scenario) "The Visitation" pg.96
- The Beast Within (standalone RPG compatible with Chill where you play monsters)
- Chill Companion (sourcebook)
- Horrors of North America (sourcebook with scenario) "Once Bitten" pg.81
- Lycanthropes (sourcebook with 2 scenarios) "The Beast of Exmoor" pg.84, "Long Hot Summer" pg.111
- Things (sourcebook)
- Undead & Buried (scenario)
- Unknown Providence: SAVE in New England (sourcebook with 4 scenarios) "Weekend in New England" pg.30, "Death's Head Revisited" pg.47, "Bitter Remnants" pg.81, "Dark Providence" pg.93
- Vampires (sourcebook with scenario) "Vengeance of Dracula" pg.97
- Veil of Flesh (scenario)
- Voodoo (sourcebook with scenario) "Drums in the Night" pg.93
- Chilled to the Bone - anthology of short stories

Mayfair's game was translated into French by Oriflam in 1994.

=== Reception to Second Edition ===
In Issue 47 of Challenge, Lester W. Smith reviewed the Mayfair edition and noted the abundance of new material. Smith also liked the revamped game mechanics, and concluded, "Problems? None that I've found so far. If you liked the old Chill, I suspect you're going to like the new one even better."

Stewart Wieck reviewed Chill in White Wolf #23 (Oct./Nov., 1990), rating it a 3 out of 5 and stated that "Chill is a good, solid horror game, but the terror is not quite real enough."

In the October 1992 edition of Dragon (Issue 186), Rick Swan reviewed three supplements that had been published by Mayfair Games: Apparitions Sourcebook, Lycanthropes Sourcebook, and Vampires Sourcebook. Overall, Swan thought the material was not very original: "The designers have hardly let their imaginations run wild; the approach draws primarily from legends and movies, meeting the expectations of conservative horror buffs but rarely exceeding them. Dracula and the Wolfman are welcome; vampiric Martians and lycanthropic cattle need not apply." However, Swan found the books "consistently entertaining and filled with interesting material that is intelligently presented." He concluded, "Players and referees alike should get a kick out these engaging books... I would’ve liked stronger scenarios and a few more adventure hooks, but all in all, the fastidious research, evocative writing, and enthusiasm for the material makes for a winning combination. I’m looking forward to future volumes."

Christian Lindke compared the First and Second Editions in Black Gate, saying "There are many games from the 80s that — mechanically and tonally — seem extremely dated by modern gaming standards. Chill — the first Pacesetter edition — isn't one of them. It has a kind of classic feel to it, just like all the Hammer and AIP movies it was inspired by. It isn't a dark and serious horror game, but it is an adventurous one. If you wanted to pretend to be Peter Cushing's Van Helsing hunting Christopher Lee's Dracula, there was no better game than Chill during the early Pacesetter era. The later Mayfair game never captured the charm of the original and for a time it looked like fans of non-Lovecraftian horror were going to be left without a high quality horror RPG."

=== Other reviews of the Second Edition ===
- Review in Shadis

== Third edition ==
In 2012, Mayfair Games sold Chill's intellectual property rights to Martin Caron and Renée Dion. Two years later, Growling Door Games announced they had entered into a licensing agreement with Caron and Dion to publish Chill. The following year, Growling Door Games published the third edition of the game. They subsequently published three sourcebooks and several scenarios from 2016 until Growling Door ceased operations in 2019.

- Chill 3rd Edition Core Rulebook
- Chill Master's Screen
- Chill Tokens
- Free scenarios
  - A Lamp Gone Dark
  - Big Sky
  - Cold Dark Earth
  - Dead Hearts
  - El Cucuy Came for Carlito
  - High Tide
  - in the Domain of the Mariner
  - Let Sleeping Dogs Lie
  - Manhunt
  - Sunshine in Maine
  - Temple of the Skin Man
  - The Last Stop Boys
  - The Wild Hunt
  - Whispered Confessions
- Good Fences Make Good Neighbors (free quickstart)
- Monsters (sourcebook)
- SAVE: The Eternal Society (sourcebook with 4 scenarios)
- Undead (sourcebook)

The third edition and two sourcebooks were translated into French by A.K.A. Games in 2017. A.K.A. Games also translated the Chill Master's Screen, SAVE: The Eternal Society and Monsters into French. The third edition rulebook and supplements remain for sale directly from Martin Caron.

In 2019, Salt Circle Games signed an agreement with Caron and Dion to release new material for third edition to be sold via the crowd-sourcing website Patreon. In 2020, Salt Circle Games began closed playtesting of an unannounced Fourth Edition of Chill and published a supplement for the third edition titled Horrors of the Unknown: Volume 1. Salt Circle Games made new third edition character sheets available in 2021 and announced an upcoming setting supplement, Unknown Atlanta, with no expected publication date.
