= The Klingons: A Sourcebook and Character Generation Supplement =

Tabletop role-playing game supplement

- Publisher: FASA
- Publication date: 1983

The Klingons: A Sourcebook and Character Generation Supplement is a 1983 role-playing game supplement for Star Trek: The Role Playing Game published by FASA, and written by John M. Ford.

== Contents ==
The Klingons: A Sourcebook and Character Generation Supplement is a supplement which includes background material and a system for generating Klingon characters.

== Reception ==
Dale L. Kemper reviewed The Klingons in Ares Magazine #17 and commented that "The Klingons game supplement adds a new dimension to the Star Trek gaming experience. It allows you to recreate your favorite Klingons from the TV series to add new nasties to the scene, all in a beautifully detailed background describing new details of the Klingon Empire. This is certainly a must for any avid Star Trek game fan and a welcome addition to FASA's line of Star Trek game products."

Steve Crow reviewed The Klingons in Space Gamer No. 70. Crow commented that "This supplement is the perfect buy for any Star Trek fan, whether he or she buys the roleplaying Star Trek rules or not. For those people who like playing bloodthirsty, backstabbing characters, or those who want a change of pace from the Prime Directive-bound Federation officer, this is the supplement of choice."

William A. Barton reviewed The Klingons for Different Worlds magazine and stated that "In spite of a few minor flaws [...] and quite a few more typos than should have managed to slip through proofing, The Klingons is an excellent addition to FASA's Star Trek line. Now players who enjoy portraying characters to whom rape, pillage, and plunder is part of the natural order can do so with a clear conscious as members of Star Trek's most popular villains. FASA has announced their intention to publish future adventures specifically for Klingon characters, and if they are as of high a quality as this supplement, they should be good (if such a term can apply to Klingon doings). If you don't already own a copy of The Klingons, I suggest you pick one up as soon as possible. You'll be missing a whole new viewpoint of Star Trek if you don't."

== Reviews ==
- Polyhedron #31
- Analog Science Fiction and Fact
