= Interface apparency =

Interface apparency is a term used in technology to describe the degree to which a user interface enables a user to understand hidden contingencies, such as drop down menus or context menus which only appear after an action, within a computer or computerised system; or, how easy it is for a person coming upon an interface such as a website, a computer program, or a kiosk, to understand the sequence of steps required to perform a complex action using that interface.

Spatial visualization ability (SVA) helps to predict which users will be hampered by low levels of apparency in an interface; the higher a person's SVA, the less trouble they will have with an interface with hidden contingencies.
