= Apparent =

Apparent may refer to:

- Apparent magnitude, a measure of brightness of a celestial body as seen by an observer on Earth
- Apparent places, the actual coordinates of stars as seen from Earth
- Heir apparent, a person who is first in line of succession
- Apparent death, an antipredator behavior known as playing dead
- Apparent wind, a wind experienced by a moving object
- Eire Apparent, a band from Northern Ireland
- Apparent authority (or ostensible authority) relates to the doctrines of the law of agency
