= Eidolon (video game) =

2014 video game

- Developer: Ice Water Games
- Publisher: Ice Water Games
- Engine: Unreal Engine 3
- Platforms: Microsoft Windows, macOS (some video cards only)
- Release: WW: August 1, 2014
- Genres: Adventure, Survival
- Mode: Single-player

Eidolon is a first-person open world adventure video game with narrative and survival elements, developed and published by Ice Water Games. The game was released on August 1, 2014 for Microsoft Windows and macOS.

The player character travels through the wilderness and ruined cities of post-apocalyptic Western Washington, which is depicted using stylized, low-polygon graphics. While navigating this vast space, the player collects documents that reveal the stories of its previous inhabitants and the death of civilization; a key theme of the game is the potential for nature to outlast human activity. Although the player must obtain food and manage the risks of cold and injuries, these aspects of the gameplay were designed to be less challenging than in most survival games, to support a more relaxed mood and slower pace of exploration.

Eidolon obtained a mixed reception. While reviewers mostly appreciated its distinctive graphical style (which drew comparisons with Proteus) and its narrative, some criticised the gameplay as too slow-paced or repetitive.

== Gameplay ==
The player character holds a fishing rod next to a lake and campfire, with stylized trees and hills visible in the background. The floating green shape to the right marks a collectible document, while the icons in the lower left are status effect indicators.

Eidolon simulates the exploration of an open world from a first-person perspective. The extensive world map encompasses multiple biomes including forests, mountains and the remains of ruined cities, and walking across it requires hours of real time. The graphics, which have been described as minimalist, feature stylized, polygonal objects, an absence of textures and a large draw distance. The game world's appearance is affected by varying weather and a day-night cycle. The game features a minimal HUD with small icons to indicate status effects such as hunger and illness, and most interaction is managed as part of the backpack interface.

Navigation is a principal challenge for the player. The game initially provides no information about its geography or objectives, and although maps can be found within the game these do not indicate the protagonist's location. The player must also attend to the protagonist's survival, which involves obtaining food, staying warm and treating injuries. Failure to satisfy material needs can lead to sickness and starvation. However, a protagonist who reaches the point of death will be revived at a safe location with no loss of inventory items or any penalty beyond the time required to return to a previous location.

Several objects may be found to assist navigation and survival: a fishing rod, compass, bow and binoculars. Unlike in many survival games, these tools are simply found and do not need to be crafted. The game can present items in multiple locations depending on how the player chooses to explore. In an article on Kotaku, Luke Plunkett discussed Eidolon as a development of the survival genre, noting that it was distinguished from earlier games in the genre by the easy and forgiving nature of the gameplay, as well as its "peaceful" atmosphere.

Non-player characters do not appear directly, but documents and images that they have left behind can be collected. Discovering the characters' personal stories allows the player to piece together the history of the area and the reasons for its present abandonment. Documents are accompanied in the viewing interface by tags identifying associated characters and locations, and clicking a tag reveals the direction of the nearest undiscovered document with the same tag.

== Plot ==
Eidolon takes place in approximately the year 2400, according to the game's website. The setting is a compressed and simplified representation of Western Washington, including the Puget Sound region and the Olympic Peninsula; the Kitsap Peninsula was added by a patch after release. Victoria, British Columbia is also accessible via a road bridge from Port Angeles. The player begins in a forest between Bellevue and Olympia. Gradual exploration reveals that the region is deserted and has largely reverted to wilderness, with its former cities reduced to overgrown ruins. Much of Seattle is underwater, while the other major cities are ringed by massive walls and littered with human skeletons.

The background to this desolation is revealed through documents and images that the player may collect in any order. It becomes clear that events were set in motion by the development of technology that increased human longevity. When an earthquake in 2031 flooded Seattle, it exposed deposits of a new mineral that was used to construct towering "Beacons" in cities around the world. Humans were nearly immortal while within range of a Beacon, but their biological dependence on the technology left them at risk of fatal withdrawal symptoms outside the cities. Responding to the massive movements of population and tension between supporters and opponents of the Beacons, many cities constructed walls, isolating themselves from each other and the rural population that continued to experience natural lifespans. This period also saw the rise to prominence of the Sennin, people with heritable mutations that granted innate immortality and superhuman abilities.

Growing conflicts and social breakdown culminated in "the Fall", a period around 2110 in which the destruction of Beacons by extremists left city-dwellers to die or flee to surviving cities, themselves diminishing in number and hostile towards refugees. Bellevue and Olympia fell at this time, while Victoria survived as a secluded police state for several decades longer. By the period in which the game is set, the rural communities in Western Washington that survived the Fall have disintegrated. In one series of letters, a Sennin named Triya reveals that she came to Washington long after the Fall in search of a cure for Beacon dependence for the world's few remaining cities; she eventually found this in Victoria, but its effectiveness is unknown.

== Development and release ==
Eidolon's primary creator, Kevin Maxon, began work on the game as a thesis project while studying game design at Western Washington University, and it was then developed over 20 months by Maxon's company Ice Water Games. Thematically, Maxon intended to contrast the transience of human civilization with the permanence of nature. This theme is reflected in the game's use of Walt Whitman's poem "Eidolons", which provided not only the title but quotations that appear when the protagonist sleeps. Maxon describes the game as "post-human" rather than "post-apocalyptic" because of the absence of human NPCs.

The game's design, influenced by academic debate on the relative priority of systems and stories in video games, was intended to separate its rule-based gameplay mechanics from the authored narrative of the backstory. The player character was left unspecified to avoid potential conflict between the character's goals and the player's. To allow the player to develop "mid-sized" goals between their overall exploration of the world and small-scale movement, the developers added the binoculars and the system of direction indicators linked to tags. The survival elements were designed to be minimal in order to allow relaxed exploration.

The graphics were first planned as two-dimensional but changed to three-dimensional to provide the experience of viewing a distant horizon. The lack of polygons and textures for in-game objects was originally intended to allow computers to render the game's expansive landscapes, but Maxon decided that this minimalist style was actually more attractive. Although there is no seasonal cycle in the game, shifts in the color palette over the course of each day were intended to suggest the passage of seasons from spring to winter.

A pre-release trailer in December 2013 drew attention from gaming media including comparisons of the visual style to that of Proteus. This early attention encouraged a Steam Greenlight campaign, after which Eidolon was released through Steam on August 1, 2014. The game is available for Windows and Mac, but the Ice Water Games website warns of compatibility problems under OS X with some recent video cards.

== Reception ==
As of December 2016, Metacritic displays an aggregate review score for Eidolon of 64, representing "mixed or average reviews".

Video game developer Jack de Quidt wrote a positive review for Rock, Paper, Shotgun, expressing their enjoyment of both the impressionistic graphics and the experience of navigation, "treating an open world as a great spatial puzzle". They especially praised the gradual pace of the game's revelations, concerning both the narrative and the details of the gameplay, and considered that spoilers could "rob this wonderful, strange game of its power".

Writing for Kill Screen, Chris Priestman gave Eidolon a score of 62. Priestman praised the appearance of the game's "routinely poetic expanse" and noted his desire to "compulsively snap screenshots", while also noting that he encountered graphical glitches. He viewed the narrative as interesting from a philosophical and science-fictional viewpoint, finding an implied connection between the theme of immortality and the player character's own ability to survive seemingly lethal events. However, the review took a less favorable view of the mechanics of discovering documents, arguing that this was over-repetitive and detracted from the intrinsic pleasure of exploration in an overjustification effect.

Radu Haulica's Softpedia review gave Eidolon three stars out of five ("poor"). In contrast to de Quidt, Haulica complained that discovering the narrative required excessive, tedious wandering, and also that the limited survival aspects provided insufficient additional reason for engagement. Haulica considered that although views of distant scenery could be effective, the minimal visual style and the "very limited and drab color palette" were generally unappealing.
