= Witness for the Defense (Star Trek: The Role Playing Game) =

Role-playing games supplement

Witness for the Defense is a 1983 role-playing game adventure for Star Trek: The Role Playing Game published by FASA.

== Plot summary ==
Witness for the Defense is an adventure which features the Horta from the episode "The Devil in the Dark".

== Publication history ==
Witness for the Defense is the second adventure published by FASA for Star Trek: The Role Playing Game.

== Reception ==
William A. Barton reviewed Witness for the Defense in Space Gamer No. 70. Barton commented that "Witness For The Defense is a well-constructed adventure for ST:RPG and should provide a satisfying session of play for a crew of Star Fleet players - especially those who particularly enjoyed the Horta episode of the old series."

Barron Barnett reviewed Witness for the Defense for Different Worlds magazine and stated that "The plot in this adventure has all the necessary trimmings as well as the beef to make it a most enjoyable and playable role-playing game. Therefore, this critic believes that Witness for the Defense is an excellent investment for the new or old role-player and gamemaster alike. I personally recommend this game."
