= Trouble Brewing (Gangbusters) =

Trouble Brewing is a 1982 role-playing game adventure published by TSR for Gangbusters.

== Plot summary ==
Trouble Brewing is an adventure in which a campaign setting is centered around Lakefront City, embroiled in a turbulent turf war between rival bootlegging factions during Prohibition. The supplement features more than 150 non-player characters, and includes several short adventure scenarios.

== Publication history ==
GB1 Trouble Brewing was written by Tom Moldvay, with a cover by Jim Holloway and illustrations by Jeff Easley, and was published by TSR in 1982 as a 32-page book with an outer folder.

== Reception ==
Lawrence Schick considered Lakefront City to be an analog of Chicago.
