= Grav, Bærum =

District of Bærum, Norway

Coordinates: 67°31′N 12°07′E

Grav is a district in the municipality of Bærum, Norway. Mainly a residential area, the population (2009) is 4,463.
