= Andria Hayday =

American game designer

- Occupation: Game designer

Andria Hayday is a game designer who has worked primarily on role-playing games.

== Career ==
Between 1983 and 1984, approximately 200 people left TSR as a result of multiple rounds of layoffs; because of this Andria Hayday joined CEO John Rickets, as well as Mark Acres, Gaye Goldsberry O'Keefe, Gali Sanchez, Garry Spiegle, Carl Smith, Stephen D. Sullivan and Michael Williams in forming the game company Pacesetter on January 23, 1984.

Hayday and Bruce Nesmith designed the DragonStrike board game, which was published by TSR, Inc. Hayday oversaw the artistic design of Jeff Grubb's 1992 Arabic setting Al-Qadim. Her D&D design work includes Monstrous Compendium Spelljammer Appendix (1990), Darklords (1991), Ravenloft Campaign Setting, 2nd Ed. (1994), Domains of Dread (1997).
