= Star Trek: The Role Playing Game =

Tabletop science fiction role-playing game

Star Trek
The Role Playing Game
- Cover
- Designers: Guy McLimore, Greg Poehlein, David Tepool
- Publishers: FASA Corporation
- Publication: 1983 (1st edition); 1985 (2nd edition)
- Genres: Science fiction (Star Trek)
- Systems: Custom

Star Trek: The Role Playing Game is a role-playing game set in the fictional Star Trek universe published by FASA Corporation from 1982 to 1989.

== History ==
Jordan Weisman of FASA wanted to get one of the biggest space adventure licenses and acquired the Star Trek license in 1982. Weisman and L. Ross Babcock III looked outside FASA to build a Star Trek design team, but FASA rejected four different game designs over several months that focused too heavily on combat rather than the utopian future envisioned by Gene Rodenberry. The fifth design team was the freelance group Fantasimulations Association, composed of Guy McLimore Jr., Greg Poehlein, and David F. Tepool, and they created a workable design that FASA approved.

Star Trek: The Role Playing Game (1983) has a tactical combat system in which battles are simulated using a square grid, and is based on the FASA board game Grav-Ball (1982).

The game was published as a boxed set with a 128-page book, an 80-page book, and a 56-page book, two counter sheets, and dice. Weisman and Babcock insisted that the designers not have the game transition from a role-playing game into a board game during space combat, so the Fantasimulations designers created a system in which each section head operated from their own "console", so that the role of the captain during combat was to coordinate everyone else. The supplement The Klingons (1983), a book which was co-authored by John M. Ford, had an influence on subsequent Star Trek productions by Paramount. Paramount was unhappy with the two Officer's Manual (1988) and First Year Sourcebook (1989) supplements for Star Trek: The Next Generation, and so Paramount pulled the Star Trek license from FASA after feeling like these supplements did not match well with how they viewed the Next Generation universe.

Game historian Stu Horvath commented that Paramount's decision did not sit well with fans of the game, noting that it "pissed off a lot of fans of the RPG! After six years and a substantial pile of books and magazines, players were invested in this versions of the Star Trek universe.""

== Setting ==
Star Trek: The Role Playing Game is set in the Star Trek universe before Star Trek: The Next Generation. Most player characters are members of Starfleet engaged in space exploration missions. They typically hold senior posts on a starship bridge and visit alien planets as part of landing parties.

The game's published supplements and modules are mostly set in the original crew movie era (AD 2280s/90s), but a few are set during the original TV era (AD 2260s) or a century later in the Next Generation era (AD 2360s/70s). See Official Supplements by era below.

=== FASA Trek vs. "canon" Trek ===
FASA designed their Star Trek game universe nearly five years before Star Trek: The Next Generation (TNG) (1987–1994). The designers built their game universe when there was no official canon, and they borrowed heavily from ideas in the Star Trek original series, the Star Trek animated series, fan fiction, and the works of Star Trek novelist John M. Ford.

Game elements which either were never introduced into what later became canon Star Trek, or which differ significantly from how canon Star Trek presents them, include:

==== John M. Ford's Klingons ====
The game's depiction of the Klingons, the result of work by science fiction author John M. Ford, differs from later canon. Ford's Klingons not only appear in the supplement The Klingons for the game, but also in his Star Trek novel The Final Reflection, which is told almost entirely from a Klingon perspective. Ford designed his Klingon society to provide a logical basis for the actions and statements of onscreen Klingons in the original TV series, as well as the differing appearance of the Klingons in the original series and those in Star Trek: The Motion Picture (the only movie featuring Klingons to have been released when the novel and game supplement were first published). They are guided by a philosophy expressed in their Klingonaase language as komerex tel khesterex, roughly translated as 'that which is not growing is dying'; komerex, referring to any structure growing and expanding its control over its surroundings, is also their word for their empire (komerex Klingon). This leads to a belief that the proper role of species not part of a komerex is to serve those that are, and the Klingons have subjugated many of these servitor species (kuve) in their conquests. The philosophy also motivates their actions on a personal scale, with individuals engaging in schemes and intrigues to enhance their personal power and that of their extended family, and generates traditions like starship officers being promoted as a result of assassinating their superiors.

The Klingons seen in Star Trek: The Motion Picture, or "Imperial Klingons", are the original natives of the Klingon homeworld Klinzhai. The ones seen in the TV series are "human-fusion" Klingons, a result of genetic engineering combining the DNA of humans and Imperial Klingons into a hybrid better able to work in environments occupied by humans and thought to better understand them (for purposes of fighting them). Romulan-fusion Klingons also exist (Ford's Klingons contacted the Romulans before humans) and possibly other hybrids (such as with the Orions, whose space abuts both the Empire and the Federation).

Ford's Klingons (at least those serving in their space fleet) believe that when they die they will serve in a "Black Fleet" in the afterlife. Given the fact that few stars are visible at night on most of Klinzhai due to cloud cover, they have a mystical reverence for "the naked stars" and believe they remember acts of courage performed under them.

In contrast, the Klingons in Star Trek: The Next Generation and subsequent TV series, as well as the later movies, have a culture and traditions based more on a cross between the vikings and Japanese Samurai (or, rather, Western imaginations of them), focused on personal and familial honor and placing value on sacrificing their lives for the causes they serve. The canonical Klingon Empire is governed by the High Council, led by a chancellor, instead of an emperor. Their language, tlhIngan Hol, is different from Ford's Klingonaase, and their homeworld is Kronos (Qo'noS in Klingon). Until Star Trek: Enterprise, there was no canonical explanation for the differing appearance of Klingons in the original TV series compared to the movies and The Next Generation. In the Star Trek: Deep Space Nine episode "Trials and Tribble-ations", the matter was joked about but left unexplained; in the Enterprise episodes "Affliction" and "Divergence", it is explained as an infection caused by an attempt to infuse Klingons with the DNA of Khan Noonien Singh (a variation of the human-fusion idea).

==== Romulans ====
When the game was published, the only filmed material featuring the Romulans were the two Original Series episodes "Balance of Terror" and "The Enterprise Incident". FASA's Romulans are the descendants of prehistoric Vulcans transplanted to the planet Romulus by the species known as the Preservers (mentioned in the TOS episode "The Paradise Syndrome"). Before developing interstellar travel, Romulan science concluded they were not native to their planet, leading to a social and religious goal of building a "Road to the Stars" to find the "gods" that placed them there, leading to the establishment of the Romulan Star Empire.

The Romulans are one of the Federation's chief antagonists in Star Trek: The Next Generation, featured in many episodes, and a canon explanation of their origin is given in that series. They are the descendants of Vulcans who did not agree with Surak's doctrines of logic and emotional suppression, instead choosing to leave Vulcan and travel through vast distances of space to their new home on Romulus. A similar concept was used by Diane Duane in Spock's World and the Rihannsu series of novels.

==== The Triangle ====
The game supplement Trader Captains and Merchant Princes, first published in 1983, introduced "the Triangle", a lawless area wedged between the space occupied by the United Federation of Planets, the Klingon Empire, and the Romulan Star Empire.

The Triangle supplement later introduced a set of color maps, allowing players to know exactly how long it would take them (in game time) to travel between star systems.

This lawless area was popular with players as it allowed them to escape the strict parameters of a military campaign. Most campaigns with civilian or non-Starfleet characters are based entirely or in part within the Triangle.

==== Ship classes ====
The game introduces a number of starship classes not based on those seen in the series, though many of them borrow from the starship design standards set in the original TV series and first two movies: Federation ships have saucer sections and outboard engine nacelles, Klingon ships have a primary hull with a command section at the end of a long boom, and Romulan ships look like birds.

They include, but are not limited to: the Bader-class scout, Baker-class destroyer, Chandley-class frigate, the Enterprise-class cruiser (the refitted Constitution-class introduced in Star Trek: The Motion Picture), Derf-class survey ship, Larson-class destroyer, Loknar-class frigate, Nelson-class scout, Northampton-class frigate, the so-called Reliant-class cruiser (the FASA name for the movie-era Miranda-class cruiser), the Mission-class transport, Royal Sovereign-class battlecruiser, M'benga-class hospital ship and the Sagan-class science ship (an upgrade of the canon Oberth-class starship). A few designs were made for ships mentioned in canon but not seen. One of these was FASA's conjecture of the Ambassador-class starship, which resembles a modified Enterprise-class cruiser with Excelsior nacelles; in canon the Ambassador is a precursor to the Galaxy-class starships.

The distinct design of several of those ships, notably the Chandley-class frigate and the Loknar-class frigate, have made them popular in non-canon Star Trek folklore. The Loknar, which predates the NX-class starship design, bears a more than passing resemblance to the titular ship in Star Trek: Enterprise.

The Mission-class transport, a shuttle-style, warp-capable ship designed for small crews and short missions, is similar to the small, long-range, shuttle-style runabouts introduced in later Star Trek series. The FASA Mission-class transport predates it by more than a decade.

==== Stardates ====
The stardates in the original series are arbitrarily assigned but tend to be larger for episodes produced later in the series' run. FASA's game introduces the notion of reference stardates based on Gregorian dates, similar to a standard fan practice for constructing stardates. A date in or after the year 2000 in year 2XYZ, month MM, day DD becomes Stardate X/YZMM.DD. For example, FASA set the date of the detonation of the Genesis device in Star Trek II as Stardate 2/2206.20, corresponding to June 20, 2222. Dates before 2000 use negative numbers before the slash.

Beginning with Star Trek: The Next Generation, filmed materials assign stardates in a more systematic way. The first season of TNG has stardates of the form 41XXX.XX, with the numbers starting just above 41000.00 and increasing towards 41999.99 as the season progresses. Subsequent seasons have stardates beginning with 42, 43, etc. Star Trek: Deep Space Nine and Star Trek: Voyager used stardates corresponding to the season of TNG that was airing at the same time, then progressing forward after TNG went off the air (DS9 season 1's stardates began with 46, and Voyager season 1 episodes had stardates beginning with 48).

==== Star Trek historical timeline ====
A number of key dates in the FASA Star Trek universe are about 60 years out of phase with their equivalent dates in the canonical Star Trek universe. For example, the game dates the original five-year mission of the Enterprise from 2207 through 2212, while the canonical dates are 2265 through 2270. Also, the game takes most of its fictional history between the present day and the 23rd century from the Star Trek Spaceflight Chronology, the contents of which are almost totally contradicted by later canonical materials (especially the film Star Trek: First Contact and the series Enterprise).

==== Languages ====
Supplements to the basic game introduce players to the rudiments of the Romulan and Klingon languages. Neither language, as expressed in the game, is the same as later depictions in the Star Trek series.

== System ==
Star Trek: The Role-Playing Game is a skill-based system in which character skills are determined by time spent in previous service. The rules cover character creation, familiar characters from the series, Vulcan telepathics, weapons and equipment, personal and spaceship combat, and encountering new civilizations. The boxed set includes three introductory scenarios and an 80-page pull-apart book of Enterprise deck plans.

The game system is percentile based. Success or failure is determined either by rolling against a set difficulty target, a player's skill, or a hybrid of both.

FASA had previously written supplements for GDW's Traveller, an association which influenced the early structure of the Star Trek game, particularly in character generation.

The rulebooks also provides systems for governing personal combat and exploration of space and planes, and the first edition provides rules for combat between starships; the second edition moves the starship combat rules into a separate board game. Supplements provide additional rules for characters in the Klingon Empire and Romulan Star Empire, interplanetary trade and commerce, starship design, and campaigns focusing on other non-Starfleet players.

Each planet in the game's atlas has a code that - coupled with the character's merchant skill and some luck - allow players to buy and trade across the galaxy. A ship's carrying capacity is not based on tonnage but on volume. There are also rules on buying and selling stock on the Federation stock market.

=== Character generation ===
Players roll dice to determine the beginning attributes of their character. Star Trek: The Role Playing Game characters begin with seven basic abilities - Strength, Endurance, Dexterity, Intellect, Luck, Charisma, and Psionic Potential. These attributes are adjusted depending on the character's species. (Vulcans, for example, gained a natural bonus to their Psionic Potential score, a measure of their heightened psionic skill.)

Players have the option of playing almost any humanoid species introduced in the original Star Trek TV series, the animated series, or the first four movies. These include Humans, Vulcans, Tellarites, Andorians, Orions, Klingons, and Romulans. Two other species introduced in the animated series, Caitians and Edosians, can also be played.

Players use dice rolls on various tables to determine skills acquired before joining Starfleet, and then those gained by their shipboard assignment (helm operations, sciences, medical, communications, etc.) during tours of duty, which also leads to increases in rank before determining their final posting for the start of play. Later supplements allow players to generate Starfleet Intelligence agents, Klingon and Romulan military personnel, Orion pirates, and civilian merchants.

Game statistics are provided for principal characters in the Star Trek TV series (Kirk, Spock, Dr. McCoy, Scotty, etc.), allowing players to play those roles instead of generating their own characters.

=== Starship Tactical Combat Simulator game ===
The first edition of the game includes a tactical starship combat game, which was later redeveloped into the Starship Tactical Combat Simulator.

The game's basic rule system provides a simple system for moderating space battles, in which each player assumed a role in the battle, typically by manning a station on the ship's bridge.

The Captain determines the strategy, the Engineer is responsible for power management and allocation to different systems such as weapons and shields, the Helmsman for firing weapons, the Navigator for managing deflector shields, and the Communications Officer for damage control.

FASA later developed that system into a more complex standalone game, the Starship Tactical Combat Simulator, similar to a tabletop wargame. During a role-playing session, if the adventure calls for a space battle, players have the option of using this standalone game to determine the outcome of the battle.

== Official publications ==
=== Rulebooks ===
- Star Trek: The Role Playing Game, 1st Ed. (1982)
- Star Trek: The Role Playing Game, 2nd Ed. (1983)

=== Supplements ===
==== Set during the original series ====
- Game Master's Screen (1984)
- U.S.S. Enterprise Deck Plans (supplement, 1983)
- Klingon D-7 Battlecruiser Deck Plans (supplement, 1983)
- Ship Construction Manual, 1st Ed. (supplement, 1983)
- Ship Recognition Manual: The Federation, 1st Ed. (supplement, 1983)
- Ship Recognition Manual: The Klingon Empire, 1st Ed. (supplement, 1983)
- Star Trek Gamemaster's Kit (supplement, 1983)
- Trader Captains and Merchant Princes, 1st Ed. (supplement, 1983)
- Tricorder/Starship Sensors Interactive Display (1984)
- The Four Years War (supplement, 1986)

==== Set in the movie era ====
- The Klingons (supplement, 1984)
- The Romulans (supplement, 1984)
- Star Trek III Sourcebook Update (supplement, 1984)
- Federation Ship Recognition Manual (supplement, 1985)
- Klingon Ship Recognition Manual (supplement, 1985)
- Romulan Ship Recognition Manual (supplement, 1985)
- Ship Construction Manual, 2nd Ed. (supplement, 1985)
- The Triangle (supplement, 1985)
- The Triangle Campaign (supplement, 1985)
- The Federation (supplement, 1986)
- Klingon Intelligence Briefing (supplement, 1986)
- The Romulan War (supplement, 1986)
- Star Trek IV Sourcebook Update (supplement, 1986)
- Klingons: Game Operations Manual (supplement, 1987)
- Klingons: Star Fleet Intelligence Manual (supplement, 1987)
- The Orions (supplement, 1987)
- Regula-1 Orbital Station Deckplans (supplement, 1987)
- Star Fleet Intelligence Manual - Game Operations (supplement, 1987)
- Star Fleet Intelligence Manual - Agent's Orientation Sourcebook (supplement, 1987)
- Trader Captains and Merchant Princes, 2nd Ed. (supplement, 1987)

==== Set in the TNG era ====
- Star Trek: The Next Generation Officer's Manual (supplement, 1988)
- Star Trek: The Next Generation First Year Sourcebook (supplement, 1989)

=== Adventures ===
- Denial of Destiny (adventure, 1983)
- The Vanished (adventure, 1983)
- Witness For The Defense (adventure, 1983)
- Demand of Honor (adventure, 1984)
- Margin of Profit (adventure, 1984)
- Orion Ruse (adventure, 1984)
- Termination: 1456 (adventure, 1984)
- Graduation Exercise (adventure, 1985)
- The Outcasts (adventure, 1985)
- Where Has All The Glory Gone? (adventure, 1985)
- A Matter of Priorities (adventure, 1985)
- A Doomsday Like Any Other (adventure, 1986)
- Conflict of Interests (adventure, 1986)
- Decision at Midnight (adventure, 1986)
- The Dixie Gambit (adventure, 1986)
- The Mines Of Selka (adventure, 1986)
- An Imbalance of Power (adventure, 1986)
- Old Soldiers Never Die (adventure, 1986)
- Return to Axanar (adventure, 1986)
- The Strider Incident (adventure, 1987)

=== Related publications ===
- Star Trek III: Starship Combat Game Box Set (supplement, 1984)
- The White Flame (scenarios for the Combat Simulator, 1987)
- Stardate magazine, Vol. 1 (issue 1 - 8) and Vol. 2 (9–11) by FASA.

== Reception ==
William A. Barton reviewed Star Trek: The Role Playing Game in Space Gamer No. 64. Barton commented that "I like this game. And I think you will, too, despite any picky points you can find that don't quite agree with your own concept of how a Star Trek game should be [...] It has its flaws as does any system and it wasn't possible to cover every aspect of Star Trek in one game. But everything you really need for a satisfying Star Trek role-playing system is to be found here - in fact, just about everything you need for any SFRPG. So I recommend you not be put off by the high price of this package. [...] I think you'll be glad you entered the Final Frontier. This game, so far, is my pick of the best role-playing system of 1983."

Sandy Petersen reviewed Star Trek: The Role Playing Game for Different Worlds magazine and stated that "Star Trek is the first science fiction game I have ever wanted to play in the strength of the game itself. I have played many science-fiction role-playing games simply because I love the genre, and hoped the game would serve as a tool to allow me to enjoy science fiction. But Star Trek was an end in itself."

Steve List reviewed Star Trek: The Role Playing Game in Ares #16 and commented that "Star Trek game is an ambitious work, generally well-done, with some minor flaws. The worst of these is in any case a matter of taste – the episodic nature of things versus the continuous campaign approach."

In Issue 3 of the game magazine Gateways, Wayne Koh noted that "power hungry Players" tended to gravitate to the captain's role and then become a dictator. Koh suggested that gamemasters should make the captain a non-player character to prevent this. Koh concluded that the game was "well worth the investment of time and money needed to experience it Since it's a game that offers many things to many different types of people, Star Trek: The RPG should appeal to you whether you're the die hard Trekker, the confused bystander, or even the lowly generic role player."

Russell Clarke reviewed Star Trek: The Role Playing Game for White Dwarf #58, giving it an overall rating of 9 out of 10, and stated that "Star Trek the RPG is a worthy addition to the SF role-playing genre and I highly recommend it."

William A. Barton reviewed Star Trek: The Role Playing Game, Second Edition in Space Gamer No. 71. Barton commented that "second edition Star Trek: The Role Playing Game is an even better avenue to gaming the final frontier than its predecessor. Those who own the original won't need this edition to continue to play, as both are compatible, but will certainly find enough new material that they won't be sorry for buying it. If you haven't yet tried ST:RPG - especially if you're new to SF roleplaying - I recommend this game over its competitors for ease of play, consistency, and sheer enjoyment."

Steve Nutt reviewed Star Trek: The Role-Playing Game for the British games magazine Imagine, and stated that "The game places great emphasis on role-playing. If your group is hack and slash then they had better change their approach before they play Star Trek. After all, if you are Captain Kirk then you should act like him. The referee should also play the game in the spirit of Star Trek, with scenarios as wacky as you like. If the role-playing game is played like the film, then it is first class; if not, it could get rather bloodthirsty. It has to be pitched right."

In Issue 37 of Abyss, Dave Nalle noted the simplicity of the rules, pointing out, "Because of the simplicity of the rules and the familiar topic, this could be a particularly good game for introducing new players to SF role-playing, though it may not serve so well for more demanding and experienced gamers." Nalle did not like how the game "tends to force players to follow certain professions and background, as laid out in the prior experience system." Nalle concluded that the game "has its share of flaws, but it comes close to achieving just what it should. It recreates the Star Trek environment very convincingly, repeating familiar background information, expanding and fleshing out the new setting, encouraging players to embark on new adventures rather than just reliving the adventures of the Enterprise and her crew."

In his 1990 book The Complete Guide to Role-Playing Games, game critic Rick Swan noted "With its simple mechanics and clear presentation ... Star Trek is a fan's dream come true." Swan did point out some ambiguities around the use of skills such as Administration, and thought that other skills such as Negotiation "would be better handled by role-playing instead of a die-roll." With regards to combat, Swan thought it wasn't particularly realistic, but "combat is quick and exciting." Swan felt that the game was similar to the television series in scope, writing that it "lends itself better to single adventures than extended campaigns." Swan concluded by giving the game an excellent rating of 3.5 out of 4, saying, "role-players comfortable with the simplicity of the series need look no further — the game is a flawless reproduction."

Phil Clare retrospectively reviewed Star Trek: The Role Playing Game for Arcane magazine and stated that "Despite FASA finally losing the license, it does seem rather odd that there isn't a Star Trek RPG currently available despite interest in the past from TSR, Mayfair and Steve Jackson Games. Ironically, however, this is probably for the best because the Star Trek franchise is now highly formulaic, and let's not forget the creative differences FASA had not only with Paramount, but also the original design team. All this should make those of you who own a copy not only particularly smug, but also secure in the knowledge that the likelihood of another ST:RPG of the same quality appearing is pretty slim. And any game designers reading should take this as a challenge."

== Other reviews and commentary ==
- Isaac Asimov's Science Fiction Magazine
- Sorcerer's Apprentice #16
- Polyhedron #24
- Analog Science Fiction and Fact
