= Garry Spiegle =

American game designer and writer

Garry Floyd Spiegle
- Born: August 12, 1945; Fairfield, Alabama, U.S.
- Died: June 25, 2018 (aged 72)
- Resting place: Forest Hill Cemetery (Birmingham, Alabama)
- Occupation(s): Game designer, writer

Garry Floyd Spiegle (August 12, 1945 in Fairfield, Alabama – June 25, 2018) was a game designer who worked primarily on role-playing games.

== Career ==
After the original Dragonlance group began, the Dragonlance Series Design Team was later expanded to also include Margaret Weis, Douglas Niles, Bruce Nesmith, Mike Breault, Roger Moore, Laura Hickman, Linda Bakk, Michael Dobson and Garry Spiegle. Between 1983 and 1984, approximately 200 people left TSR as a result of multiple rounds of layoffs; because of this Spiegle joined CEO John Rickets, as well as Mark Acres, Andria Hayday, Gaye Goldsberry O'Keefe, Gali Sanchez, Carl Smith, Stephen D. Sullivan and Michael Williams in forming the game company Pacesetter on January 23, 1984.

His D&D design work includes Death's Ride (1984) and The Kidnapping of Princess Arelina (1984). He was also involved in the design for the Gamma World module, The Cleansing War of Garik Blackhand (1983).

Garry Spiegle died on June 25, 2018, of a heart attack at the age of 72.
