= Gamemaster's screen =

Equipment of tabletop role-playing game

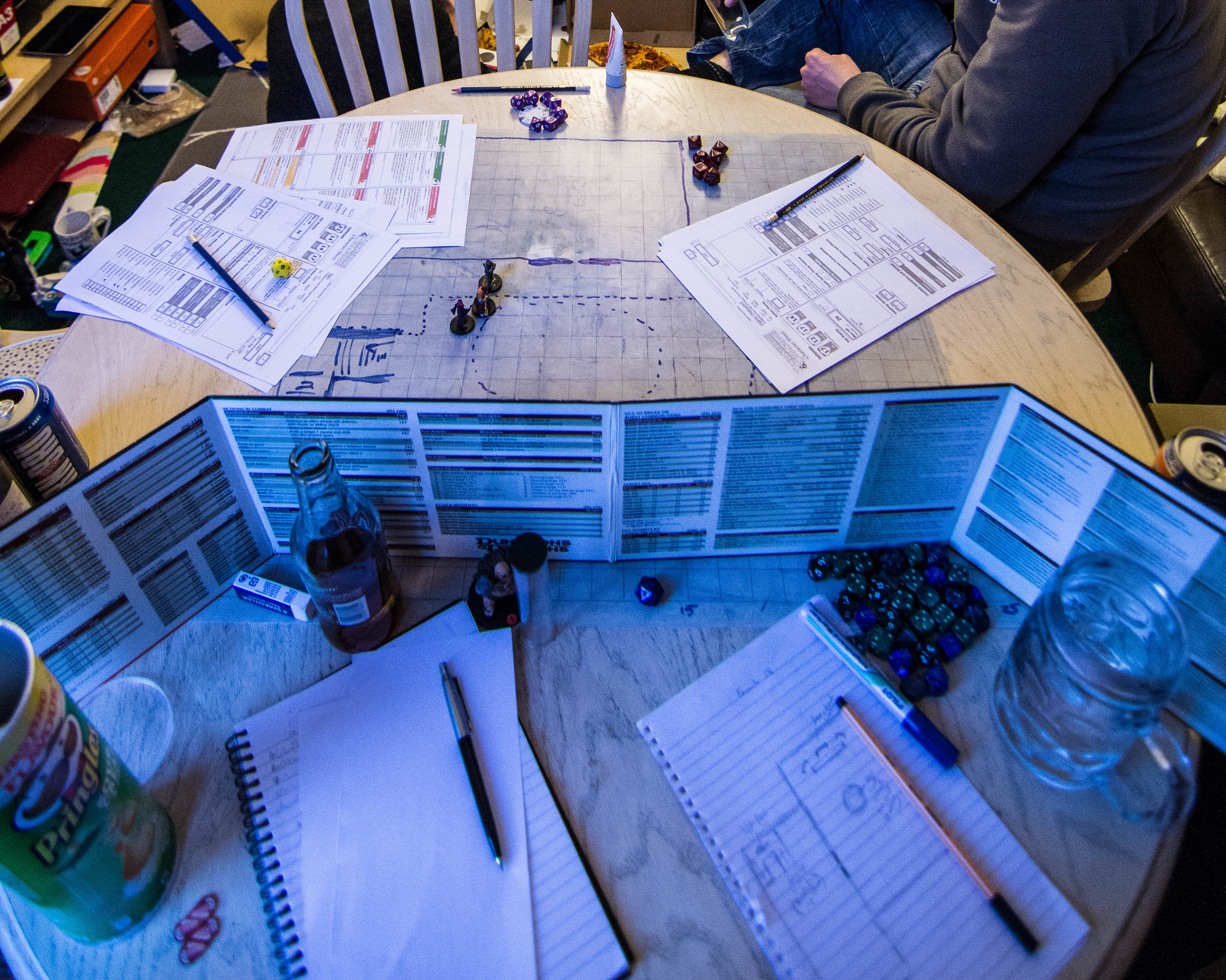
The gamemaster's screen separates the players' view of the game (top) from the gamemaster's private information and dice rolls (bottom)

A gamemaster's screen, also called a GM's screen, is a gaming accessory, usually made out of either cardboard or card stock, used by a gamemaster to hide all the relevant data related to a tabletop role-playing game session from the players. It also hides any dice rolls made by the gamemaster that players should not see. In addition, screens often have essential tables and information printed on the inside for the gamemaster to easily reference during play.

== History ==
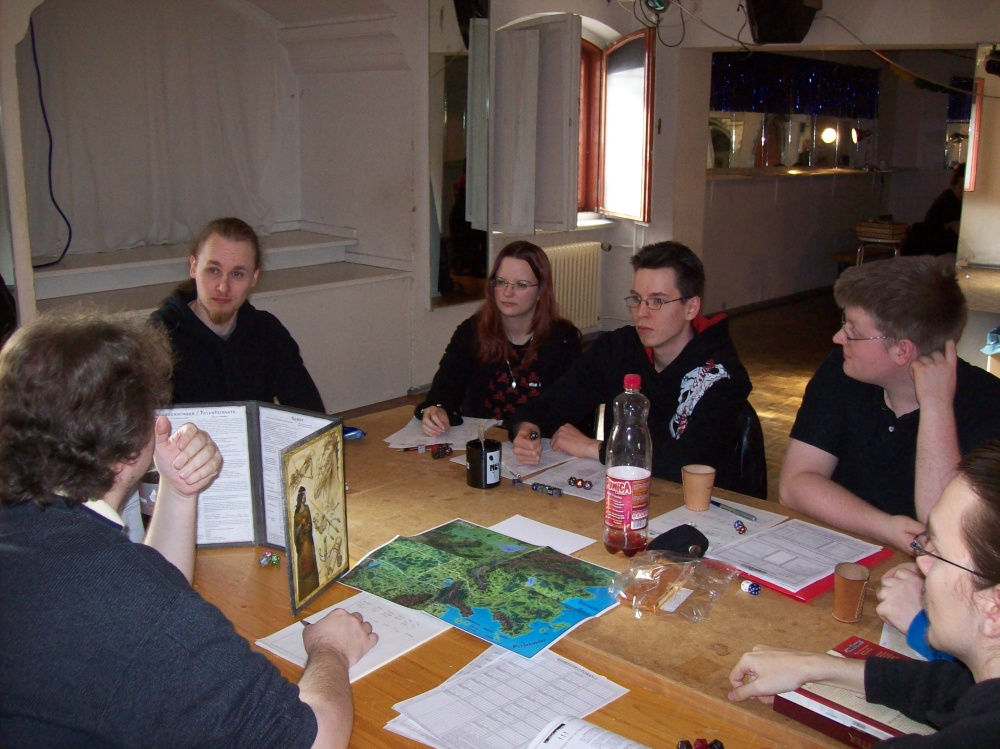
A gamesmaster (left) behind a screen

The first commercial gamemaster's screen was the Judge's Shield, produced by Judges Guild in 1977 for use with Dungeons & Dragons. This featured three pieces of 8.5" x 11" cardstock designed to be taped together to form a three-panel screen, the two outer pieces in a vertical (portrait) orientation, and the middle piece in a horizontal (landscape) orientation. This design allowed the gamemaster to peer over the lower middle section more easily. The Judge's Shield had tables on both sides of the screen, with information relevant to the players on their side, and information for the gamemaster on the other side. Information included "Attack matrices with minus armor classes, saving throws, weapons' strikes & damages, weapon priority, phantasmal forces, encounters, experience points & levels, monster compendium of statistics." The Judge's Shield proved to be a popular item, and less than a year after it was introduced, it had become Judges Guild's second best-selling product.

In 1979, Judges Guild also produced a gamemaster screen for Game Designers' Workshop's science fiction role-playing game Traveller. This consisted of four pieces of 8.5" x 11" green cardstock, designed to be taped together to form a four-panel screen. Once again, tables and information relevant to the players and the gamemaster were printed on their respective sides.

Seeing the commercial success of these accessories, TSR, Inc. published the Dungeon Masters Screen in 1979 for their new Advanced Dungeons & Dragons game. This product differed from the two Judges Guild screens in several ways. While the Judges Guild screens came as separate pieces of cardstock that had to be taped together, the TSR product included two ready-made screens: a two-panel 17" x 11" screen, and a three-panel 25.5" x 11" screen. And while, like the Judges Guilds screens, the gamemaster's side of the screen was covered in tables and information, TSR designed the player's side to be purely decorative, with art by Dave Trampier. (A second printing later the same year featured art by Errol Otus). The first edition version of the Dungeon Masters Screen garnered a Gamer's Choice award that year. The use of artwork on the player's side became the industry standard from that point on.

Other game companies quickly followed suit. In 1980, Flying Buffalo created a "Project Director's Screen" for the science fiction role-playing game The Morrow Project; in 1981, Metagaming released its "Fantasy Masters' Screen" for The Fantasy Trip; and in 1983, FASA published a "Gamemaster's Screen" for Star Trek: The Role Playing Game — possibly the first commercial use of the term "gamemaster's screen".

Since then, many companies have produced gamemaster's screens for their particular games.

== Other examples ==
- Call of Cthulhu Keeper's Screen
- Champions Gamemaster's Screen
- Chill Master's Screen
- Conspiracy X Game Master's Screen
- Elric! Gamemaster Screen
- Fantasy Masters' Screen
- Gamma World Referee's Screen and Mini-Module
- Hollow Earth Expedition Gamemaster Screen
- Judge's Screen
- The Morrow Project Gamemaster's Shield and Reference Tables
- Pathfinder Roleplaying Game: GM's Screen
- Star Frontiers Referee's Screen and Mini-Module
- Star Trek: The Role Playing Game Game Master's Screen
- Star Wars: Gamemaster Screen for Second Edition
- Top Secret Administrator's Screen and Mini-Module
- Traveller Referee Screen
- Universe Gamemaster's Screen and System, World, and Environ Logs

== Reception ==
The appearance of the gamemaster's screen elicited various responses from critics.

In the October-November 1977 edition of White Dwarf (Issue #3), Don Turnbull reviewed The Judge's Shield and found it a very useful tool, saying, "These panels contain virtually all the information needed for DM and players during a game, and moreover are much more durable than the Ready Ref Sheets. Unless you have made up your own, an essential for any serious DM."

In the UK magazine Imagine, Jez Keen called the tables printed on TSR's Dungeon Master's Screen more useful and accessible than those found in the Dungeon Masters Guide rulebook.

By 1992, Rick Swan opined that buying the ubiquitous gamemaster's screen had become a waste of money: "Consisting of a few cardboard panels and a handful of tables copied directly from the rule books, referee screens are arguably the worst buy in gaming. Anybody with a photocopier, a pair of scissors, and a bottle of glue can put together a customized screen in an hour or two, so there’s little incentive to spring for the authorized version unless you’re a compulsive collector or just plain lazy."
