= Trader Captains and Merchant Princes =

Tabletop Science fiction role-playing game supplement

- Publishers: FASA
- Publication: 1983; 42 years ago
- Genres: Science fiction
- ISBN: 978-0425069516

Trader Captains and Merchant Princes is a 1983 role-playing game supplement for Star Trek: The Role Playing Game published by FASA.

== Contents ==
Trader Captains and Merchant Princes is a supplement which enables player characters to be independent merchants operating outside of Star Fleet regulations to pursue trade and wealth as they adventure.

== Reception ==
William A. Barton reviewed Trader Captains and Merchant Princes in Space Gamer No. 69. Barton commented that "Overall, Trader Captains and Merchant Princes is an excellent expansion to an outstanding game. if you already play ST:RPG, you should pick it up. If not, take a look – it might help convince you to switch."

Frederick Paul Kiesche III reviewed Trader Captains and Merchant Princes for Different Worlds magazine and stated that "In conclusion, I feel that the designers have done an excellent job on this supplement. With the exception of the lack of specifics on cargo, everything was well thought out. The book is filled with many nice touches (artwork for example). I recommend this book for anyone who runs Star Trek and wishes to flesh out his or her universe or even to those running other science-fiction campaigns who are looking for an interesting background supplement on traders."
