= Appearance =

Appearance may refer to:

- Visual appearance, the way in which objects reflect and transmit light
- Human physical appearance, what someone looks like
- Appearances (film), a 1921 film directed by Donald Crisp
- Appearance (philosophy), or phenomenon
- Phantasiai, a term in ancient Greek philosophy variously translated as "appearances," "impressions," "presentations," and "representations."
- Appearance (law), the coming into court of either of the parties to a suit, and/or the formal act by which a defendant submits himself to the jurisdiction of the court.

Appear or Appears may refer to:

- "Appear" (나타나) a song from Secret Garden OST (2010), by Kim Bum-soo.
- "Appears", a song released by Ayumi Hamasaki in 1999

Appearing may refer to:

- Appearing (media consultants) - "Appearing", broadcast media promotion consultants, a PR agency headed by Scott Piering

== See also ==
- Apparition (disambiguation), any instance of appearing, but usually referring to a supernatural phenomenon
- Cap (sport) in some sports is a metaphorical term for a player's appearance on a select team, such as a national team
