= Carl Smith (game designer) =

American game designer and writer

- Born: United States
- Occupations: Game designer, writer

Carl Smith is a game designer who has worked primarily on role-playing games.

== Career ==
Carl Smith was an editor at TSR when Tracy Hickman got Harold Johnson, then Jeff Grubb, Smith and Larry Elmore in on the idea of Dragonlance before Margaret Weis and Douglas Niles joined them.

Between 1983 and 1984, approximately 200 people left TSR as a result of multiple rounds of layoffs; because of this Smith joined CEO John Rickets, as well as Mark Acres, Andria Hayday, Gaye Goldsberry O'Keefe, Gali Sanchez, Garry Spiegle, Stephen D. Sullivan and Michael Williams in forming the game company Pacesetter on January 23, 1984. In 1985, Smith announced that Pacesetter was developing a "totally new concept in gaming", that he referred to as the "instant adventure roleplaying game"; this project was published in the summer as Sandman: Map of Halaal (1985).
