= Stephen D. Sullivan =

American novelist

- Occupations: Novelist, Illustrator
- Writing career
- Period: 1984–present
- Genres: Fantasy, science fiction
- Website: stephendsullivan.com

Stephen D. Sullivan is an American author and artist. He is a prolific author, having written more than twenty-five books.

== Career ==
Sullivan worked for TSR as a writer and artist, where among other things he worked on the adventure modules Scourge of the Slave Lords and Castle Amber. While at TSR, he also contributed to the Arms and Equipment Guide. Sullivan later taught a course on Dungeons & Dragons at MIT, the first of its kind in the country.

Sullivan joined CEO John Rickets, Mark Acres, Andria Hayday, Gaye Goldsberry O'Keefe, Gali Sanchez, Garry Spiegle, Carl Smith, and Michael Williams to form the game company Pacesetter in January 1984. Sullivan worked at Pacesetter as the art director.

In comics, in 1987, Sullivan wrote and drew the humor comic book Wabbit Wampage #1 with Amazing (based on a board game he had earlier developed with Pacesetter). He wrote Newstralia issues #1–2, published July–October 1989 by Innovation Publishing. He wrote two issues of Solar for Acclaim Entertainment in 2004.

In July 2000, he wrote the novel The Scorpion, the first book in the Legend of the Five Rings Clan Wars novelization series.

Sullivan wrote the Dragonlance novelization The Dragon Isles in 2002. He is the author of Dragonlance: The New Adventures books The Dying Kingdom (July 2004; volume two of the series), and Warrior's Heart (November 2006, the first book in the Goodlund Trilogy).

His novelization of Manos: The Hands of Fate won a Scribe Award for Best Adapted Novel in 2016.
