= Mark Acres (game designer) =

American game designer

- Occupation: Game designer

Mark Acres is a game designer who has worked primarily on role-playing games.

== Career ==
Mark Acres assisted Rick Krebs in developing the role-playing game Gangbusters. Acres also worked with Jeff Grubb on ideas for the Marvel Super Heroes roleplaying game published by TSR in 1984. Between 1983 and 1984, approximately 200 people left TSR as a result of multiple rounds of layoffs; because of this Acres joined CEO John Rickets, as well as Andria Hayday, Gaye Goldsberry O'Keefe, Gali Sanchez, Garry Spiegle, Carl Smith, Stephen D. Sullivan and Michael Williams in forming the game company Pacesetter on January 23, 1984. Acres worked freelance for Mayfair Games after Pacesetter ceased publication in 1986.

His D&D design work includes Tomb of the Lizard King (1982) and New Beginnings (1991).
