= Pacesetter Ltd =

Tabletop role-playing game publisher

Pacesetter Ltd was a game company based in Delavan, Wisconsin, founded in 1984. Company founders included CEO John Rickets, and Mark Acres, Andria Hayday, Gaye Goldsberry O'Keefe, Gali Sanchez, Garry Spiegle, Carl Smith, Stephen D. Sullivan and Michael Williams. Pacesetter produced both tabletop role-playing games and board games.

Chill was possibly Pacesetter's most well-known product. It was subsequently republished in revised form by Mayfair Games after Pacesetter's demise. When the company 54°40' Orphyte was founded in 1991, they purchased many of the product rights to Pacesetter's games and all of its backstock. Chill is owned by Martin Caron. In October 2014, it was announced that Martin Caron had granted Matthew McFarland the right to create and publish "Chill" (3rd edition) Star Ace is owned by Phillip Reed and Christopher Shy of Ronin Arts. Timemaster and Sandman are owned by Daniel Proctor of Goblinoid Games (publisher of Labyrinth Lord, among other games). Goblinoid Games also purchased the copyrights and trademarks to the Pacesetter brand and logo, thus reviving the brand and folding it into their product lines. Goblinoid Games continues to publish games using the same Pacesetter RPG house system.

Pacesetter logo

Historical Pacesetter product line includes:

Role-playing games

- Chill (1984)
- Star Ace (1984)
- Time Master (Pacesetter Ltd, 1984; Goblinoid Games, 2011)
- Sandman (Pacesetter Ltd, 1985; Goblinoid Games, 2012)

Board games

- Chill: Black Morn Manor (1985)
- Wabbit Wampage (1985) Winner of the 1985 Charles S. Roberts Award for Best Fantasy or Science-Fiction Board Game
- Wabbit Wevenge (1986)

Current Pacesetter product line includes:

Role-playing games

- Cryptworld (2013); The new Pacesetter horror game.
- Rotworld (2011); A zombie survival horror game.
- Majus (2012); A modern urban fantasy game.
- Time Master (2011)
- Sandman (2012)
