= List of Ravenloft characters =

This is a list of fictional characters from the Ravenloft campaign setting for the Dungeons & Dragons fantasy role-playing game.

== Darklords ==
Darklord is a title used to refer to the mystically imprisoned and cursed ruler of a domain. A Darklord was originally an individual who had committed a truly horrific crime, which drew the attention of the enigmatic Dark Powers. The Dark Powers then proceeded to craft a personal kingdom around the Darklord. This crafted domain serves as a kingdom and a prison: the Darklord gains incredible powers while within its borders but can never leave it, although most Darklords can seal their domain borders at will. Within their domains, the Darklords are forever tormented by the objects of their desires, which are often the objects for which they committed their crimes.

=== Adam ===
Adam was the darklord of Lamordia, a domain that is an homage to Frankenstein (1818) by Mary Shelley. Known as Mordenheim's Monster or 'the Creature," he is an extremely intelligent and nimble dread flesh golem. Adam is the most successful creation of Dr. Victor Mordenheim in his research into the creation of life, albeit the one that causes him grief unmeasured. Adam reduced the doctor's wife Elise to a vegetative state and apparently murdered their adopted daughter Eva. The two are inextricably bound together: Dr. Mordenheim has Adam's immortality, and in return Adam shares the doctor's anguish. Usually hidden from sight, Adam is believed to spend most of his time on the Isle of Agony, part of the archipelago known as the Finger.

"Ravenloft: Realm of Terror (1990) introduced mad scientist Dr. Mordenheim, his creation Adam, and their realm of Lamordia. Forbidden Lore (1992) then expanded on their story by detailing a secret society called Adam's Children". The adventure Adam's Wrath (1994) provided "the first in-depth look at the domain [...]. Not only does it involve Ravenloft's star golem, Adam, but it also features 'a number of skeletal bats and flesh golems' that are the result of Adam's attempts to recreate Dr. Mordenheim's experiments". Adam was also a major character in the 1994 novel, Mordenheim, written by Chet Williamson.

Jon Garrad, in the book Mary Shelley's Frankenstein, 1818–2018 (2020), criticized the original flesh golem in Advanced Dungeons and Dragons (AD&D) as "superficial" and "simplified" compared to its Frankenstein (1818) inspiration. However, Garrad argued that the 1990 Ravenloft iteration "partially rehabilitates the Frankenstein Creature", noting "Adam Mordenheim represents a step up from the Karloffian imitation in standard AD&D, back towards the pursuing threat of the novel, but this detail and depth is not grounded in any context or interaction". Garrad highlighted Adam's power within the game rules as the domain's "true antagonist" and while there are mechanical similarities to the flesh golem, Adam does not share visible characteristics and is instead described "as nimble, swift and clever". Garrad also criticized the lack of a proper relationship between Adam and Mordenheim, noting that characters are not in "metaphysical and personal opposition" which results in a "static, leaden pastiche of Frankenstein".

=== Alfred Timothy ===
Alfred Timothy is the lord of Verbrek. He murdered an old Vistani woman who saved him from being burned at the stake for being a werewolf. He reverts to his hated human form whenever he embraces his predator instincts.

=== Ankhtepot ===
Anhktepot is the greater mummy darklord of Har'Akir who is usually found within his tomb. His curse is the desire to be both mortal and a great ruler, but his wishes are denied. All he rules is a wasteland with only one tiny community; and the only way to achieve mortality is to sacrifice a human being—but the boon only endures from dawn to dusk during which he sacrifices the entirety of his powers. His wife is Nephyr. His son is Thutepot. Anhkamon was his vizier. Those who he raised as greater mummies are known as the Children of Anhktepot. Among them is Hotep who he forced into perpetual slumber so as to nullify the risk that her lust for revenge posed. The 3rd Verse of Hyskosa's Hexad foretells the seventh rising of Anhktepot. A statue of Anhktepot is among the six that grace the outer wall of his tomb.

"In the past, Har'Akir has utilized Orientalist tropes, and has been largely inspired by ancient Egypt". In the 5th Edition sourcebook Van Richten's Guide to Ravenloft (2021), Har'Akir was reimagined to remove these Orientalist tropes and "part of the solution was to turn Har’Akir’s malevolent darklord, Anhktepot, into something other than an English actor covered in hundreds of yards of fabric pretending to be an Egyptian". Anhktepot now looks "more like a high fantasy creature". Wizards of the Coast hired "an outside writer named K. Tempest Bradford, whose work in Clockwork Cairo: Steampunk Tales of Egypt served as inspiration for Wizards of the Coast," as part of the creative process to reimagine both Anhktepot and Har’Akir.

=== Azalin ===
Azalin Rex
- Ravenloft character

In-universe information
- Species: Human lich
- Gender: Male
- Title: King
- Nationality: Darkon
- Class: Wizard
- Alignment: Lawful evil
- Universe: Ravenloft, Greyhawk

Azalin Rex or "The Rex" is an undead wizard-king. He was the Darklord of the domain of Darkon. He is known by his subjects for his draconian rule. "Azalin is a longtime Ravenloft resident, having first been introduced in the second adventure set in Ravenloft, The House on Gryphon Hill. The famed lich is known for his rivalry with the vampire Strahd von Zarovich and his multiple attempts to escape from Ravenloft, some of which have had long-reaching consequences in Ravenloft lore".

==== Description ====
As an undead wizard, Azalin's true appearance resembles a skeleton or mummy. In his everyday appearance, however, Azalin maintains the illusion of a live king, closely mimicking his late-life persona: an elderly man with aquiline features and a piercing gaze, with unkempt dark hair topped by a heavy iron crown. However, he can alter his appearance to resemble many humanoid individuals, even that of a different race or gender. Perhaps as a result of this in-game flexibility, official portrayals of Azalin differs greatly from artist to artist, much more so than portrayals of characters such as Lord Soth or Strahd von Zarovich. (Note: cf. artwork by Stephen Fabian in Ravenloft campaign sourcebooks and Roots of Evil, against Robert Klasnich in From the Shadows, Danilo Gonzalez in King of the Dead, Fred Fields in Lord of the Necropolis, and Talon Dunning in Ravenloft Gazetteer 2.)

Azalin's phylactery is an enormous golden dragon skull, which is almost immovably heavy. It also appears near indestructible. His dependence on it may be equal to or even less than most liches—some sources maintain that he will be instantly killed if it is destroyed, while others imply that he will survive as long as his physical body is not destroyed along with it. Like most liches, Azalin is extremely protective of his true name, although whether this is out of any true weakness (perhaps to spells such as Trap the Soul, which require the true name to be spoken) is debatable.

==== History ====
===== Early life =====
Firan Zal'honan was born in the earldom of Knurl, a city-state in the eastern Flanaess. As the second of three sons of Lord Turalitan Zal'honan, his political future was decidedly dim from his birth, and he spent much of his childhood overlooked by his parents. From an early age, Firan demonstrated a keen intelligence, marked with a distaste for his fellow men and their deviation from discipline and order—a revulsion that manifested itself in self-loathing several times for his own perceived weaknesses. Firan respected his father's strict rulership, as well as the prior claim to succession exercised by his older brother Ranald, but disliked his father's superstitions and his bans against magic. Perhaps in a display of rebellion, Firan entered the underworld of Knurl's mages, studying under the wizard Quantarius.

As a youth, Firan seems to desire control over others and of himself above all else, although he also is given to angry outbursts and quick decisions which he later comes to regret. Even into his later lichhood and rulership status, these attributes recur, painting the portrait of a ruler demanding fealty and promising order, but secretly and constantly frustrated by the failings of his fellow men and of himself.

The only family member he loved without reservation was his younger brother, Irik. Where Firan was quick to anger and slow to forgive, Irik was the opposite. Firan pursued his studies and thirsted after knowledge, but occasionally displayed an inability or ignorance of the potential repercussions. The death of Irik would prove a telling example: At 15, Firan summoned a demon that broke loose from his power and killed Irik. Firan's actions caused his father to expel Quantarius from the city, and Firan chose to follow him into exile, continuing his studies. In time, he would learn magics that few other mages could master (and which are actually largely beyond reach of normal D&D characters): he could permanently heal himself by stealing others' life forces, he could read minds and steal magical information—completely learning new spells with a thought, he could extend his own life by draining the vitality of enemies.

===== Rulership of Knurl =====
Ranald Zal'honan died as a result of a dissipate and gluttonous lifestyle, and Firan returned to his home, assuming the seat of power and ruling as "Azal'Lan," or wizard-king. His credits include reversing the decline that Knurl suffered under Ranald's reign, and returning it to economic and military significance. Also, under his reign, magic once again became an important part of Knurl's daily life.

Firan swore allegiance to the distant Malachite Throne of the Great Kingdom, but conducted many unsanctioned military campaigns against the surrounding tribes, adding handsomely to Knurl's holdings. His reign was marked by prosperity and growth, but also by violence and dissent from the conquered tribes.

Firan was 60 when he married, as his life-extending spells started to fail and he needed an heir. His loveless marriage took 18 years to produce a son due to his wife utilizing a witch's power to prevent both her and Firan from conceiving a child. Olessa died in childbirth, cursing him. Firan named his son Irik, after his brother—but the name would carry greater resonance. His son inherited the kindness and generosity of Firan's brother, and would not follow his father's harsh footsteps, a trait Firan saw as weakness. When Irik was caught freeing political prisoners, Firan was faced with a choice: to pardon his son, or to kill him. In accordance with his own laws and as a symbol of his strict devotion to them, Firan not only permitted the execution but wielded the headsman's blade himself.

Although this act impressed upon his citizens the strictness of his rule, Firan himself was plagued with doubts over his own actions. He became obsessed alternately with finding a means to live forever, or finding a means to bring his son back from the dead to try to train him anew. As he lamented his failure as a father, a dark and nameless force presented him with the secret of lichdom.

Firan shed his mortality and changed his official title to Azal'Lan, ruling for 60 more years. During this time, Knurl became a major power in the Flanaess, even daring to renounce fealty to the Malachite Throne. Azal'Lan's military and trade power began to infringe on the territories of surrounding kingdoms, who sought ways to eliminate Azal'Lan. Assassins and armies alike seemed unable to topple him, but the course of his downfall would come from the minor tribes he had defeated early in his reign.

Azal'Lan was finally lured out of his defenses by the promise of a new magical spell that could allow a mage to restore true life to a corpse. Blinded by his hopes for restoring his son, Azal'Lan went forth with a small retinue of guards, and was then ambushed by a group of mercenaries. Fleeing their pursuit, he entered a dense fog to lose them. He was never to see Knurl again.

===== Arrival in Ravenloft =====
He appeared in Barovia, whose inhabitants called him "Azalin" upon hearing his name. Continuing in his insatiable quest for knowledge, he terrorized several local boyars searching for magical texts. During this time, he apparently discovered something similar to the life restoration spell he sought, but whether he could learn it at all is unclear (see Memory anomalies below).

It was not long before he drew the attention—and grudging respect—of the domain's dark lord. Trapped in Barovia and suffering from a strange malady that prevented him from learning new spells Azalin entered into an uneasy alliance with Strahd. Azalin, who was a more powerful spell caster than the vampire, would instruct Strahd in the magic arts in exchange for his help in Azalin's experiments which were aimed at returning the lich lord to his own plane. This collaboration led to the first concerted attempt to break through the misty border surrounding Barovia and escape using an apparatus of Azalin's design.

This attempt resulted in the pair arriving in the outworld realm of Mordent, in which lies the town of Mordentshire. There, the Apparatus split Strahd's personality into good and evil manifestations: Alchemist and Creature respectively. Azalin's role in this adventure (The House on Gryphon Hill) appears to be largely observational. The Alchemist and Creature's attempts to destroy each other caused the escape attempt to fail, and forced Mordent into joining the Demiplane of Ravenloft.

===== Memory anomalies =====
After the failed Mordent incident, the already-tense relation between Azalin and Strahd frayed further. When the domain of Mordent actually appeared beyond Barovia's borders, Azalin deduced that the Misty Border of Ravenloft might hold other lands, free from Strahd's authority. He entered the mists alone, and emerged in a realm of his own: Darkon.

Here, the exact nature of Azalin's existence is unclear, on two counts. The first count is the issue of a personality split—one source (King of the Dead, a canonical novel) maintains that a traveling wizard named Firan appeared at the border, while an undead lich-like creature named Darcalus materialized in Darkon's central castle, Avernus. Firan, a just and good adventurer, eventually sought out the depraved tyrant Darcalus and confronted him, rather as the Alchemist Strahd and the Creature Strahd did in Mordent. However, few other Ravenloft products refer to this (although they do not explicitly contradict it). According to King of the Dead, Firan stumbled about Darkon with no memory, and did not regain his memory until he defeated Darcalus, whereupon the undead essence merged with his own and made him Azalin once again. The novel also depicts his rage at realizing he had come so close to escaping his despicable undead state as well as the burdens of rulership.

The second count is the question of Azalin's memory. As with many Darklords, Azalin suffers a curse tailored to his personality, granted by The Dark Powers of Ravenloft. In this case, one dimension of his curse is the inability to learn any new magic at all—a crippling blow to any wizard, and downright unbearable for a lich, especially one who has knowingly sacrificed his living self so he can pursue new magics for all eternity. All sources cite this handicap, but they disagree on the time it manifested. Some sources, including King of the Dead, imply that he could not learn new magic from the moment he arrived in Barovia (such as the resurrection spell he found); others, such as the Gazetteers and campaign setting books, imply he must have been able to learn new magic while helping Strahd penetrate the Demiplane's magical secrets. The fact that he invented Bone Golems and Zombie Golems during his time with Strahd suggests that he had some ability to innovate after arriving in Ravenloft. I, Strahd: The War Against Azalin maintains that the curse struck Azalin immediately upon entering Barovia, and that the lich tutored Strahd in the arcane arts. Azalin had the vampire lord learn and cast any spells that Azalin devised but could not personally master.

What is certain is that by the time he assumed lordship of Darkon, his curse was firmly in place. Also, a similar curse strikes all travelers to Darkon, who eventually lose their memories and gain false memories of a lifetime spent in Darkon within three months' time. Azalin's domicile, Castle Avernus, houses the Book of Names—a magical tome that records these true memories as they are lost—and it is implied that Azalin himself only rediscovered his true past after reading the book.

===== Rulership of Darkon =====
After a few years spent assembling the Kargat secret police, Azalin prepared for a massive invasion of Barovia to unseat his nemesis. The invasion was thwarted by Strahd's minions, who struck at the Kargat leadership and disrupted Azalin's chain of command. Afterwards, the effort of rebuilding the Kargat, and the appearance of intervening domains such as Falkovnia, put an end to Azalin's military interest in Barovia.

Azalin's rule over Darkon was absolute: all political, military, and Kargat matters ultimately reported to him. His rule was strictly lawful to the point of ruthlessness, but based in large part on deception—both in terms of Azalin's illusion of being a mortal king, and also in the artificial docility that his civilians displayed, thanks to their false memories. However, this concentration of power had its weaknesses, especially because Azalin demonstrated several times his willingness to abandon his people and realm at a moment's notice if it means a chance of escape from Ravenloft. Militarily, Azalin recognizes the futility of attempting to extend his borders through conquest. In defense, too, he has little to fear. On no fewer than four occasions, the neighboring country of Falkovnia to the south has declared war, and Azalin's mastery of undead has easily repulsed their soldiers.

===== Escape attempts =====
In the last 30 years, Azalin has tried to escape Ravenloft twice more. The first attempt was in manipulating the Grand Conjunction, wherein he sent powerful heroes back in time to steal key artifacts from the formation of Ravenloft. The Grand Conjunction was six part adventure series designed to update the setting from the status que outlined in "Ravenloft: Realm of Terror (1990) to its revised form in Ravenloft Campaign Setting (1994)". Azalin's actions split the Demiplane open, freeing all the Darklords to terrorize other worlds. However, his hatred for Strahd proved to be his undoing: Azalin returned to face his nemesis, giving the heroes their chance to reverse the Grand Conjunction and reform the prison of Ravenloft once more. Some Darklords escaped permanently; Azalin and Strahd were not among their number.

Azalin then initiated a side project aimed at circumventing his magical curse: he magically impregnated various women with clones of himself, then tried to harvest the clones' magical knowledge when they reached adulthood after a childhood of magical tutelage. Although this experiment failed, it did result in the creation of Lowellyn Dachine, a clone (of sorts) of Azalin, and an important figure in later day Darkon. He then toiled for 10 years in creating his "doomsday device", which would turn him into a demilich and allow his immaterial essence to escape. The prototype device turned Lowellyn Dachine into a negative planar elemental known only as Death.

The second and full application of the machine caused the Requiem, killing all life in Il Aluk, the capital city, and scattering Azalin's essence across Darkon. He remained in that state for five years before pulling himself together and taking over the corpse of his son, which had been lying in Castle Avernus for almost two hundred years. To this date, Irik's spirit haunts Azalin, reminding him constantly of his actions and urging his father towards redemption. During his absence, Il Aluk became an undead Necropolis, ruled by Death, and his Kargat lieutenants ran amok. Mortal agents loyal to Azalin helped to foil usurpation attempts by a rebel Kargat leader (Tavelia) and also by the new ruler of Il Aluk, Death. Although reinstalled as ruler of Darkon, Azalin's current concerns are the re-centralization of his power, the elimination of rebel Kargat officers, and the future of Necropolis, whose mere existence is a daily challenge to his own power.

However, Azalin's experiments seem to focus on more than just escape. He has gained several salient powers, including the ability to look into the mind and alter the memories of anybody in Darkon. His control over undead is still absolute, with no apparent limit to the number or power of slaves thus controlled, and his spellcasting largely seen as being second to none. Azalin has commissioned the services of a scholar to travel and research the domains of Ravenloft. Speculation indicates that he is still searching for a method to escape Ravenloft.

===== Current sketch =====
In the 5th Edition campaign sourcebook Van Richten's Guide to Ravenloft (2021), the Domain of Darkon is being consumed by the Mists and is on the brink of destruction after "a magical event orchestrated by Azalin that caused his castle to explode and Azalin himself to disappear from the realm". While the exact events are vague in the Darkon section of the book, a later section contains "a biography of Firan Zal'honan, a 'wandering scholar' and expert on the Mists of Ravenloft. Longtime fans of Ravenloft will recognize that Firan Zal'honan is actually Azalin's true name. The biography contains several other clues about Firan's true identity [...]. Firan is also noted to loathe the domain of Darkon (his longtime prison), have an 'almost-personal' hatred for Strahd and avoids entering the Mists without guidance from the Vistani. One potential adventure hook for Firan mentioned in the book involves retrieving an amulet bearing a tiny gold dragon skull, an object that seems like a miniature version of Azalin's phylactery".

===== Publication history =====
Game material, second edition:

- Realm of Terror (1990), by Bruce Nesmith and Andria Hayday, (ISBN 0-88038-853-6): Original Ravenloft campaign sourcebook.
- From the Shadows (1992), by Bruce Nesmith, (ISBN 1-56076-356-6): Adventure module focusing on Azalin and Castle Avernus, near the start of the Grand Conjunction.
- Roots of Evil (1993), by Eric Haddock and David Wise, (ISBN 1-56076-597-6): Adventure module focusing on Azalin's feud with Strahd, near the culmination of the Grand Conjunction.
- Ravenloft Monstrous Compendiums 1 and 2 (1996), by William W. Connors, (ISBN 0-7869-0392-9): Entries for Bone Golem, Zombie Golem, and Andres Duvall the Bardic Lich all concern Azalin.

Game material, third edition:

- Ravenloft Core Rulebook, (2001) by Andrew Cermak, John W. Mangrum, and Andrew Wyatt, (ISBN 1-58846-075-4): Azalin Rex is mentioned here, without spoiler information.
- Secrets of the Dread Realms, (2001) by Andrew Cermak, John W. Mangrum, and Andrew Wyatt, (ISBN 1-58846-076-2): Azalin Rex's in-game statistics for Third Edition are introduced here.
- Ravenloft Gazetteer Volume 2, (2003) by John W. Mangrum, Ryan Naylor, Chris Nichols, and Andrew Wyatt, (ISBN 1-58846-830-5): Detailed description of Darkon, the Kargat, and Azalin Rex. Also introduces meta-gaming ways to circumvent Azalin's supposed curse against learning new magic.

Novels:

- Tales of Ravenloft (September 1994), ed. Brian Thomsen, (ISBN 1-56076-931-9): Prologue tale by David Wise demonstrates Azalin's mastery of undead.
- King of the Dead (March 1996), by Gene DeWeese, (ISBN 0-7869-0483-6): Focuses on Azalin's life in Oerth, entry into Ravenloft, and ending with his assumption as ruler of Darkon.
- Lord of the Necropolis Oct 1997 by Gene DeWeese, (ISBN 0-7869-0660-X): Focuses on Azalin's attempts to escape Ravenloft through the Grand Conjunction and Requiem. (Declared non-canonical by TSR.)
- I, Strahd: The War Against Azalin (June 1998), by P. N. Elrod, (ISBN 0-7869-0754-1)

Presented as the diary of Strahd von Zarovich written during the period of war between Barovia and Darkon.

=== Dominic d'Honaire ===
Dominic d'Honaire is the lord of Dementlieu. He caused his childhood nanny to commit suicide, and grew to be a cunning politician who manipulated those around him. The more attracted he is to a woman, the more repulsive he appears to her.

=== Frantisek Markov ===
Frantisek Markov is a fictional character; one of the domain lords. He grew up on a small pig farm outside the village of Vallaki in Barovia. He married a young woman from the village and they opened a butcher shop there. Out of either curosity or sadism, Frantisek began to experiment with the animals, performing surgical amputations, grafts, and glandular injections - something akin to vivisection. The animals invariably died within a few days, but his gruesome hobby cost him nothing since he could still sell the meat. When his wife discovered his ghastly pastime, she was revolted and threatened to leave him. She even threatened to tell the villagers the secret about the meat they were buying. Furious, Frantisek made her his next experiment - she only lived for three days - and when her body was discovered, the villagers thought it was a horrible beast. At this point, Ravenloft sent its rolling mists to claim him where he became the darklord of Markovia.

=== Gabrielle Aderre ===
Gabrielle Aderre is the lord of Invidia. She refused to save her mother from a werewolf attack unless she revealed the true identity of her father, but refused to believe that he was a wealthy Falkovian and left her mother to die. She is unable to personally harm anyone of Vistani blood.

=== Harkon Lukas ===
Harkon Lukas is the meistersinger of the Kartakan village of Skald. He is also a wolfwere and the darklord of Kartakass. He owns and resides at the Old Kartakan Inn and Taverna. Akriel Lukas and Casimir Lukas are his children.

=== Hazlik ===
Hazlik is the Darklord of Hazlan, and its undisputed ruler. Hazlan "is less a nation than a vast magical laboratory, whose wizard overlord Hazlik views every being as either an apprentice or a test subject. He conscripts those he acknowledges as lesser wizards into performing elaborate magical experiments, twisting the fabric of magic and reality until it frays. These experiments endlessly scar a domain drained of vitality, tortured by magical disasters, and overrun with abominations. The greatest wounds affect the invisible flows of magic underpinning the land, turning it erratic and dangerous".

Hazlik is more interested in cheating death and having his revenge upon his enemies than escaping his gilded cage. The Red Wizard is one of the most powerful spell casters in the Land of Mists and has taken the extraordinary step of publicly opening a school for the mastery of the arcane. It is called the Red Academy and is located in the town of Ramulai, which it is said that Hazlik raised from stone in a single day. Peculiarities in the design of the town have invited speculation that it is some sort of immense arcane experiment. His private estate Veneficus is set back from the east bank of the Saniset River a fair distance from Toyalis. Hazlik is described as having "no interest in the politics of his own people, instead concentrating on his magical research." Mostly he entrusts the rule of his land to satraps who do not doubt the horrible fate that awaits them on experimentation tables should they displease Hazlik. It is not clear how carefully he watches them, although he does at least make nominal efforts to appear to be paying attention.

The remarkable reception of the Iron Faith among the Hazlani cannot be understood in abstraction from Hazlik. Vaasi, the language of the Church of the Lawgiver, was of course the native tongue of the Hazlani, and the social order was at least as oppressive in Hazlan as in Nova Vaasa, preparing the ground for the reception of The Lawgiver's message. Hazlik himself, however, had profound reasons for being indifferent to the cultural sovereignty of his land: to his eye the vast majority of the Rashemani, his lands inhabitants, belong to an ethnic group and culture inferior to his own. Finally, his plan and his arcane research is what he truly cares about, as his chaotic alignment expresses itself by an individualism that stands apart from his land's inhabitants.

As to the Iron Faith itself, Hazlik is an immensely proud master of arcane magic. However, such magic is blasphemy according to its doctrine, and for which he would be imprisoned, tortured, and executed publicly as an example to others back in Kantora,. Likewise, whatever faint hope that the Iron Faith had of redeeming him could hardly have survived his revocation of the ban on the use of arcane magic and his opening of the Red Academy promoting it. His Mulani tattoos are the visible signs of moral and spiritual degeneracy, serving only to confirm the faith's view of him. It is difficult to imagine that homosexuality is not viewed by the Church as an instance of the violation of the "natural order in the name of self-interest and self-gratification", although it is not clear whether Hazlik hides his sexual orientation. Additionally, the position of women according to the faith is also an issue, for Hazlik is planning to usurp the body of his female apprentice Eleni of Toyalis. In sum, Hazlik cuts a figure far closer to the Iron Faith's vision of Mytteri than of The Lawgiver.

Hazlik views the Iron Faith as a tool of social control, although perhaps not in the usual sense. An important clue concerning this matter follows: "The Lawgiver is the state religion in Hazlan and Nova Vaasa. In the latter, Prince Othmar uses it to justify his own regime." That nothing is then said of the former, invites the conclusion that Hazlik is unlike Othmar and does not see the need to avail himself of this crutch.

Alexander Sowa of CBR said that "Like most Darklords, Hazlik has a tragic backstory. Originally part of an order of mages, he was tricked into believing his lover sought to betray him. Enraged, Hazlik transformed his fellow mage into a living portal. The rulers of the lands condemned Hazlik to torture as punishment for his monstrous experiment, and he fled through the portal to escape. Then, the Dark Powers of Ravenloft drew him into the mists, with the wizard eventually emerging into a land he claimed for his own. Hazlan is a reflection of its Darklord's lack of morals, and players unlucky enough to find themselves there will have to contend with his wicked experiments."

=== Ivan Dilisnya ===
Ivan Dilisnya is the lord of Dorvinia.

=== Ivana Boritsi ===
Ivana Boritsi was born to Camille Dilisnya and Klaus Boritsi in Borca in 689 BC. She is the sister of Anton Boritsi and Sulo Boritsi, the grandchild of Lev Dilisnya and Anna Kurdzeil, the aunt of Oton Boritsi, and the niece of Oleska Dilisnya, Richtor Dilisnya, Stepan Dilisnya and Yakov Dilisnya. She is also the cousin of Clifford Dilisnya and Virginia Dilisnya, both werewolves. In 697 BC, Ivana was given Danzig's Icon of Ezra by her father. In the same year, he was poisoned to death by her mother in response to his adultery. Ivana became ruler and darklord of Borca in 711 BC, after poisoning to death her mother, the previous holder of these offices. Since 740 BC she shares control of the domain with Ivan Dilisnya, her distant cousin, .

When Ivana fell in love with a young man named Pieter, Camille Dilisnya was incensed at her daughter finding love while it had eluded her for so long. Camille disguised herself as Ivana and seduced Ivana's one true love. She then claimed he had seduced her, and succeeded in proving in Ivana's eyes that all men were evil. Ivana took the lesson to heart, and killed Pieter by saturating her own body with a virulent poison. Two years later, she turned her friend Nostalia Romaine into the first ermordenung, and used her to assassinate her mother and became the new ruler of Borca.

Starting around 717 BC, while Ivana Boritsi was between marriages, a peculiar rumor arose — likely started by jealous rivals — that she had secretly borne and then abandoned an illegitimate daughter. Ivana's confidantes know that the venom flowing through her veins renders her barren and thus consider the idea ludicrous, but the tale has proven stubbornly persistent among the peasantry and has even spread far beyond Borca. In lands throughout the Core many a wintry beauty has posed as the “dispossessed heir of Borca” to avail herself of the sympathy and prestige such an aristocratic heritage provides. Some of these women were charlatans, but others were simply naïve orphans tricked into believing a false heritage by unscrupulous advisers. Over the years, a few foolish pretenders have even traveled to Borca to present themselves to Ivana as her long-lost daughter. Ivana sees these deceivers as cruel reminders of her own bitter solitude, and rewards them accordingly.

=== Jacqueline Renier ===
Jacqueline Renier is the lord of Richemulot.

=== Lord Wilfred Godefroy ===
Lord Wilfred Godefroy is the lord of Mordent. He killed his wife and daughter and framed it as an accident, but after their ghosts haunted him for a year he killed himself and also came back as a ghost.

=== Nathan Timothy ===
Nathan Timothy is the lord of Arkandale.

=== Soth ===
Lord Soth originally appeared as a character in Dragonlance. After Soth died in World of Krynn (1988), the character "then made the jump to Ravenloft: Realm of Terror, and was quickly lined up as the star of the second Ravenloft novel. The original writer for the novel fell through. Tracy Hickman was offered a shot at the novel and declined because he and TSR were on the outs at the time. Other authors wrote proposals, but they all suggested big changes to Soth's character, which Ravenloft fiction line editor Jim Lowder refused, because he wanted to be able to hand Soth back to Krynn intact when Ravenloft was done with him. In the end, James Lowder himself was commissioned to write Knight of the Black Rose (1991), which more fully introduced Soth to the demiplane of Ravenloft". In this book, the Mists of Ravenloft plucked Soth and Caradoc from Krynn while the two battled and eventually Soth was given the domain Sithicus.

By Soth's third appearance in Ravenloft, in the adventure When Black Roses Bloom (1995), the character had become "a bit of a political hot potato. Tracy Hickman and Margaret Weis had returned to the company to write new Dragonlance novels, and they were unhappy with Soth's use in Ravenloft. Reports say that as far as they were concerned, Soth had never gone to Ravenloft, and he even appeared in a cameo in Dragons of Summer Flame (1995) … which just confused the matter — though Wizards of the Coast has made it clear that Soth's sojourn to Ravenloft is a canon part of D&D lore". Soth had one more Ravenloft focused novel, Spectre of the Black Rose (1999) by Lowder and Voronica Whitney-Robinson, which returned Soth to the Dragonlance setting as the Hickmans wanted.

Wes Schneider, lead designer Van Richten's Guide to Ravenloft (2021), confirmed that Soth is not included in the 5th Edition sourcebook to respect the canon history of the character. However, the sourcebook contains "several references and some easter eggs" to the character.

=== Tristen ApBlanc ===
Tristen ApBlanc is the darklord of Forlorn, second most ancient and smallest of the domains of dread. He rules from Castle Tristenoira, as a cursed half vampyre, half ghost.

=== Victor/Viktra Mordenheim ===
Victor Mordenheim is a man of science, wishing to revive his dead wife and funnel her essence into a new living receptacle. In its original incarnation, the Domain of Dread Lamordia was a coastal domain with two small settlements and was ruled by Adam, a flesh golem-like creature created by Doctor Victor Mordenheim. Lamordia is an homage to Frankenstein (1818) by Mary Shelley. A 1994 novel, Mordenheim, was written by Chet Williamson. Jon Garrad, in the book Mary Shelley's Frankenstein, 1818–2018 (2020), described Victor's crime as "atheistic rationalism" in a system where resurrections and reanimations are common and even "available to the most Lawful Good of law-abiding do-gooders". Garrad compared the character to Victor Frankenstein, commenting that "he was dabbling in the work of gods, and the gods, in turn, dabbled in him. Ravenloft explicitly states that he is punished out of divine spite, and that his future efforts are divinely mandated to fail". Garrad criticized that Victor and Adam are presented in "isolation" without an active relationship, noting Victor "has moved on to attempting a resurrection for the local Elizabeth Lavenza substitute" and that "there is no resolution to their situation" except for being killed by player characters "because they're there, in the usual non-logic of early RPGs".

The character was reimagined as Viktra Mordenheim in the 5th Edition sourcebook Van Richten's Guide to Ravenloft (2021). Lamordia is now ruled by Viktra, a mad scientist tormented by her inability to replicate the Unbreakable Heart device that keeps her reborn lover Elise alive, even as Elise flees from her at every turn. The limited series comic Ravenloft: Orphan of Agony Isle (2022), by writer Casey Gilley and artist Bayleigh Underwood, then featured Viktra and Miranda, a woman without memory who was resurrected by Viktra. Viktra and the Lamordia setting were next featured in The Chill of Ravenloft (2025) expansion for the video game Dungeons & Dragons Online (2006). The four-issue limited series comic Dungeons & Dragons: Ravenloft (2026), by writer Amy Chu and artist Ariela Kristantina, focuses on monster hunter Ez D'Avenir who is hunted by Viktra. In the modern techno-horror supplement Project_Lamordia (2026), Viktra is reimagined as the CEO of Mordenheim Kinetics with its campus lost in the mists of Ravenloft.

=== Vlad/Vladeska Drakov ===
Vlad Drakov is the darklord of Falkovnia, although the extent to which he appreciates this fact, and in particular his curse, is unclear. In Falkovnia's original incarnation, its "Darklord was a fairly basic analog for Vlad the Impaler [...] and it had few defining characteristics beyond being a land ruled by a brutal warlord with a penchant for ultraviolence".

Drakov hails from Taladas in Krynn, where he was a mercenary captain known as the Hawk. His men were the Talons of the Hawk, and they were widely known as ruthless and brutal enforcers of whoever was paying their expenses. When Drakov first arrived in the Land of Mists, he and his men found themselves in Darkon, where they set about trying to make a territorial claim by destroying a village and putting the inhabitants on pikes. When the villagers animated as the walking dead, Drakov and his men were forced to flee into the Mists. There the domain of Falkovnia was revealed to Drakov and held him fast.

In Van Richten's Guide to Ravenloft (2021), Falkovnia is now ruled by Vladeska Drakov and the domain "has been reimagined as a nightmarish Groundhog's Day-style loop, where a struggling nation—which happens to be ruled by a brutal warlord—is endlessly besieged by massive hordes of the walking dead, who just so happen to look like everyone this warlord has ever killed". The Darklord Vladeska "Drakov's ruthless efficiency and relentless perfectionism has turned her into a tyrant. Rather than retreat and save the lives of citizens and soldiers alike, every day she rebuilds the barricades that keep death at bay. Those same walls keep her trapped within".

=== Yagno Petrovna ===
Yagno Petrovna is the lord of G'Henna. He is the high priest and founder of the Church of Zhakata, although Zhakata is a product of Yagno's delusion.

== Other characters ==
=== Ezmerelda d'Avenir ===
Ezmerelda d'Avenir is a Vistana monster hunter introduced in the 5th Edition adventure module Curse of Strahd (2016). As a child, her family kidnapped Rudolph van Richten's son and turned him over to a vampire. d'Avenir was "deeply moved" by van Richten's mercy on her family and as a teenager ran away to seek him out. She "remained by van Richten's side for two years, helping him track down and slay many creatures of the night. But because van Richten could never bring himself to fully trust a Vistana, he kept secrets from her". This led to arguments between the two hunters and eventually they parted company. d'Avenir later lost her leg in a werewolf attack although she avoided lycanthropy. d'Avenir then ended up in Barovia after hearing rumors that van Richten was there to kill Strahd.

In 2020, Wizards of the Coast announced that "in the editorial process for Strahd’s reprint" reductive tropes would be removed. In the original Curse of Strahd, d'Avenir's "shameful secret" was her prosthetic leg. In Curse of Strahd Revamped (2020), "Ezmerelda gets one new paragraph in her section of the NPC book - she is described as losing her leg in a werewolf attack and commissioning a special prosthetic for it. She then trained herself to fight while wearing it, and now she's back in action and wears her wooden leg openly".

d'Avenir is featured in the cover art of the sourcebook Van Richten's Guide to Ravenloft (2021) and contributes to the book's fictional marginalia along with van Richten and the Weathermay-Foxgrove Twins. Her backstory is also greatly retconned – she is no longer a member of the Vistani but instead her family posed as Vistani to prey upon people, however, d'Avenir then leaves her family to join the Vistani. While she travelled with the Vistani people, she didn't find belonging. She also chooses to go by Ez instead of her full name. Eventually, d'Avenir joins a group "of adventurers led by her mentor, Rudolph van Richten," who she views as "a loving, found family". The group then falls apart over the clashes of personality between d'Avenir and her mentor and "a great misunderstanding". Charlie Hall, for Polygon, highlighted, "rather than a misguided loner, Ez is now a person searching for peace. [...] She wanders the multiverse fighting evil, searching for her family once again. [...] For a character with such a sordid history, I was pleased to see these changes in Van Richten’s Guide to Ravenloft. Ez still gets a tragic backstory, still gets to be a skilled monster hunter and fearsome in her own right. But she’s no longer wrapped up in the racist caricature that the Vistani were originally written to be, and she has been gifted with far more agency than ever before. It feels like Ez is now someone capable of overcoming evil in all its forms".

The upcoming four-issue limited series comic Dungeons & Dragons: Ravenloft (2026), by writer Amy Chu and artist Ariela Kristantina, will focus on Ez D'Avenir and the Darklord Viktra Mordenheim.

=== Gondegal ===
Gondegal, warrior appearing in the Ravenloft: Realm of Terror boxed set, he is a former member of Falkovnia's military who tired of the oppression and left to wander the demiplane.

=== Inajira ===
Inajira the arcanoloth originally appears as a villain in the adventure module, Roots of Evil.

385 years in the past, Strahd von Zarovich was a battle-weary mortal human. This changed when he entered a pact with the arcanoloth Inajira, who in exchange for unknown services to be rendered in the future granted Strahd's desire to be unbeatable in battle. Inajira, fearing nothing from the mortal, granted Strahd's request to hold Inajira's Book of Keeping until the contract was complete. Upon changing Strahd into a vampire, Strahd was whisked away to the Demiplane of Dread, Ravenloft, depriving Inajira of both his prized Book of Keeping and the completion of his contract with Strahd.

Exiled in disgrace for the loss of his possession and failure to seal his pact with Strahd, he is incensed later when Strahd returns to the Prime Material Plane during the Grand Conjunction and vows vengeance.

=== Tara Kolyana ===
Tara Kolyana, vampire hunter appearing in the Ravenloft: Realm of Terror boxed set, she wanders Ravenloft, trying to help those in need.

=== Ratik Ubel ===
Ratik Ubel, thief and revenant appearing in the Ravenloft: Realm of Terror boxed set, he wanders Ravenloft seeking his unknown killer.

=== Rudolph van Richten ===
Dr. Rudolph van Richten is a fictional character in the gothic horror campaign setting of Ravenloft. His adventures and battles with the undead are chronicled in numerous books and game products including a series of "Van Richten" guides. He has been called "D&D's Van Helsing equivalent".

van Richten grew up in the Domain of Darkon and came into conflict with the Vistani after van Richten failed to heal a critically injured Vistani. The Vistani took van Richten's son and sold him to the vampire Baron Metus. In retaliation, van Richten killed the Vistani who sold his son and a dying Vistani cursed him so that "every person dear to him would be killed by some monster". By the time he found his son, his son was already transformed and begged for death. Upon returning home after killing his son, van Richten discovered that Baron Metus had killed his wife. This put van Richten on the path to becoming a monster hunter. "Towards the end of his life he retired to Mordent where he wrote many of his famous guides" and taught his apprentices, the twins Gennifer and Laurie Weathermay-Foxgrove.

Curse of Strahd (2016) retconned parts of his fictional background. The Vistani, including Ezmerelda d'Avenir's parents, were interrogated by van Richten but ultimately spared. However, he is still cursed (at an unspecified point of time) by a Vistani seer to bring doom upon those he befriends. d'Avenir would later seek him out and van Richten would train her to be a monster hunter. Eventually, they parted ways and van Richten relocated to Barovia in disguise so he could study and kill Strahd.

This backstory is once again retconned in Van Richten's Guide to Ravenloft (2021). d'Avenir's family was posing as Vistani and eventually d'Avenir would join the group of adventurers that van Richten mentors. d'Avenir and van Richten still have a clash of personalities and this combined with "a great misunderstanding" drives the group apart. Van Richten's Guide to Ravenloft opens with a letter from van Richten to this group where he apologizes for his actions and writes, "Ez, Laurie, Gennifer, Alanik, Arthur, you're all I have left of family. I haven't said it enough, but I love you all like my own. For what it's worth, I consider you all van Richtens now". Charlie Hall, for Polygon, highlighted that "the opening pages of Van Richten’s Guide to Ravenloft tell the story of a loving, found family torn apart. The rest of the book gives players all the tools they need to maybe put it back together again".

=== Natalia Vhoriskova ===
Natalia Vhoriskova, intinerant beast appearing in the Ravenloft: Realm of Terror boxed set, she is a werewolf seeking new experiences and sensations.

=== George Weathermay ===
George Weathermay, ranger appearing in the Ravenloft: Realm of Terror boxed set, he is a righter of wrongs who is skilled at hunting.
