= Darklord (Ravenloft) =

Dungeons & Dragons characters

Darklord is a title used to refer to the mystically imprisoned and cursed ruler of a domain in Ravenloft, a campaign setting in the Dungeons & Dragons role-playing game.

== Overview ==
In the Dungeons & Dragons campaign setting Ravenloft, a Darklord is an individual who had originally committed a truly horrific crime, which drew the attention of the enigmatic Dark Powers. The Dark Powers then proceed to craft a personal kingdom around the Darklord. This crafted domain serves both as a kingdom and a prison: the Darklord gains incredible powers while within its borders but can never leave it, although most Darklords can seal their domain borders with a thought. Academic Martine Gjermundsen Ræstad explained that while the standard alignment system in Dungeons & Dragons establishes a predetermined and inherent good or evil nature for most creatures, the "evil that Ravenloft dwells on is of a different nature than" the standard Dungeons & Dragons evils and "the Darklords represent something like inner monsters, positioned as dark reflections of ourselves". She commented that, unlike other types of evil creatures in the game, Darklords can be associated with motivations that carry positive connotations, such as love. She noted that there is no inherent evil or "unrecognizably monstrous" aspect to their desires; rather, they are "passionately caring, and recognizably monstrous”, and "unquestionably human-like in a way that monsters do not have to be, representing inner monsters rather than external threats".

Darklords are subjected to ongoing, individualized forms of torment within their own domains. This torment often includes the objects for which they committed their crimes, and the Dark Powers dangle these objects before the Darklords like the fruits of Tantalus. Ræstad commented that these Darklords have "intention and free will" which results in them also having "a level of accountability" when their actions are judged by the Dark Powers; however, the punishment cycle which pushes Darklords "to further evil" raises questions about the motivations of the Dark Powers, and whether their purpose is to deliver "just punishment to evil souls" or whether they are "a force propagating and nourishing evil".

The Advanced Dungeons & Dragons 2nd Edition supplement Darklords (1991) introduced sixteen new Darklords to the setting, of which the website Diehard GameFan notes that "some of these Darklords would go on to have full adventures devoted to them, one would be the star of a SSI video game and still others would appear in published fiction. Yet others would never be seen again". Kevin Kulp, game designer, highlighted that "a notable aspect of this book is that most of the darklords aren't particularly powerful, even by 2nd edition AD&D standards. [...] It's also a nice reminder that just because someone is evil and despicable, they aren't necessarily particularly tough or good at combat. They may have other abilities, assets, or assistance". The 5th Edition sourcebook Van Richten's Guide to Ravenloft (2021), according to TheGamer website, outlines how "Darklords work in a different way than the standard D&D boss", as their influence is more than easily measurable game statistics. Rather, a Darklord is a player foe whose powers are faced "over the course of many sessions, making the players wonder when and if they'll ever get a chance to face their foe" and Darklords "do battle by turning allies into enemies, depriving heroes of sleep with nightly haunts, and dangling hope just to yank it away at the last moment". Overcoming a Darklord ultimately depends on players being "resourceful in unraveling their enemy's many schemes" over an extended period of gameplay. Van Richten's Guide to Ravenloft also introduced guidelines for a Dungeon Master to create their own Darklord.

== List of Darklords ==
Known darklords have included:

- Strahd von Zarovich, who was introduced in the original Ravenloft adventure
- Azalin Rex, who was introduced in Ravenloft II: The House on Gryphon Hill

Ravenloft: Realm of Terror (1990) included fourteen domain lords and introduced:

- Vlad Drakov, lord of Falkovnia, who was then reimagined as Vladeska Drakov in Van Richten's Guide to Ravenloft (2021)
- Mordenheim's Monster, "Adam", lord of Lamordia
- Lord Soth, lord of Sithicus
- Ankhtepot, lord of Har' Akir

The supplement Darklords (1991) focuses on "sixteen different Darklords spread out over thirteen chapters". The Darklords detailed in this supplement are:

- Ankhtepot, a mummy
- Tristessa, a drow banshee
- Bluebeard
- Ebonbane, a living evil sword
- The Three Hags
- The Headless Horseman
- The House of Lament, an evil living house
- Von Kharkov, a panther who was polymorphed into a person and subsequently turned into a vampire
- Merilee, a child vampire
- Captain Alan Monette, a werebat pirate
- The Phantom Lover, an incubus
- Marquis Stezen d'Polarno, who drains the souls of victims
- Tiyet, a mummy who doesn't appear as undead
- Zolnik, a Loup de Noir werewolf

Ravenloft Monstrous Compendium Appendix II (1992) introduced:

- Althea, medusa lord of the island of Demise

Castles Forlorn (1993) introduced:

- Tristen ApBlanc

Domains of Dread (1997) added these:

- Kas the Bloody-Handed, the vampire Darklord ruling the domain named Tovag
- Vecna, the lich god, overseeing the neighboring desert land of Cavitius

Dragon #378 (August 2009) detailed:

- Arantor, lord of Monadhan
