= Vistani =

Fictional ethnic group

- First appearance: "Ravenloft"; Ravenloft: Realm of Terror
- Last appearance: Van Richten's Guide to Ravenloft
- Created by: Tracy Hickman, Laura Hickman
- Based on: Romani people

The Vistani are a nomadic ethnic group in the Dungeons & Dragons fantasy role-playing game. They are based on depictions of the Romani people, and over time this depiction has been criticized as overly stereotyped and pejorative, and subject to some revisions in the D&D canon.

Since their introduction in the original Ravenloft module (1983) as fortune-tellers, they became a unifying element in the Ravenloft and Victorian Age Masque of the Red Death campaign settings, which offer Gothic horror scenarios.

== Publication history ==
The revised 2nd Edition boxset Ravenloft Campaign Setting (1994) provided an update to the description of the Vistani people that appeared in Ravenloft: Realm of Terror (1990). The boxset had "the best background" on the Vistani people until the dedicated 2nd Edition supplement Van Richten's Guide to the Vistani (1995). Depictions of the Vistani people were later revised in the 5th Edition Curse of Strahd Revamped (2020). Their portrayal was further retconned in Van Richten's Guide to Ravenloft (2021).

== Background ==
In a Ravenloft adventure, the players are generally confined to a region from which they must escape by solving one or more problems. The Vistani help the referee ("Dungeon Master") with the mechanics, especially in allowing players to interact and negotiate with strangers from a different culture. Their abilities have been developed accordingly.

- Vistani have some control of the Mists of Ravenloft, which divide realms. Players generally need help from the Vistani to travel reliably from one open realm to another.
- Vistani possess a powerful wanderlust, and cannot stay within a mile of a given point for more than a week before suffering a condition called "Static Burn," where the Vistani is afflicted with an illness resembling the flu or a fever. When this occurs, the Vistani has between 2 and 7 days to cross the necessary ground or permanently lose all of their mystical powers, becoming an outcast known as a mortu, which translates roughly as "Living Dead." This mechanic ensures that contact with helpful Vistani will occur only when the Dungeon Master wishes.
- Vistani possess powerful, innate magical abilities that recall Romani as imagined in popular culture. "Curse Potency" is self-explanatory: curses in Ravenloft have great power, and the curses of Vistani are more likely to come true. "The Evil Eye" is the ability to mystically blight another person's luck, whilst "the Sight" is powerful divination magic, allowing them to predict the future. The Sight is only allowed to exist amongst Vistani women; it does occur in Vistani men, but any male babe detected to have the Sight is slain.
- Vistani society has ranks: Raunie is the title of the female Vistani in the camp with the most power in the Sight. A Darkling is a Vistani criminal who has been cast out from the tribe; they hate and are hated by Vistani. A Dukkar is a male Vistani born with the Sight who has grown to adulthood. Such a being will inevitably bring great suffering to the Vistani. The only Dukkar alive is a half-fiend who rules the domain of Invidia (but is not the darklord for that domain). The Vistani who wrote the prophecy foretelling the Grand Conjunction was inferred to be a dukkar.

The fictional character Rudolph van Richten, a famous Monster Hunter in Ravenloft and author of a series of guides to hunting and slaying various monsters, had a great enmity for the Vistani for most of his monster-hunting career, but his opinion improved during his penning of Van Richten's Guide To The Vistani, during which he befriended a mortu.

== Legacy ==
The Vistani people were "described as superstitious" and had "abilities to curse and hypnotize players or cast spells like Evil Eye". They were also originally stereotyped "as 'uncivilized' and heavy drinkers", however, this portrayal was removed in the 2020 Curse of Strahd Revamped adventure module. As part of the retcon in Van Richten's Guide to Ravenloft (2021), the Vistani people are no longer considered superstitious but instead focused on their traditional practices and their abilities are grounded in the forms of magic found in Dungeons & Dragons.

Wizards of the Coast stated that in the 5th edition adventure Curse of Strahd, "the adventure includes the latest errata and a revised depiction of the Vistani" who are based on stereotypes about the Romani people. In 2020, Wizards of the Coast announced that "in the editorial process for Strahd’s reprint, as well as two upcoming products, Wizards worked with a Romani consultant to present the Vistani without using reductive tropes". On Curse of Strahd Revamped, Jon Ryan, for IGN, wrote "the updates to the adventure itself mostly consist of previously-published amendments to the book, such as tweaks to an additional character option or corrections of printing errors, but the most notable updates are to some items that were deemed insensitive or offensive after the original publishing [...]. It's worth noting that the book's illustrations of the Vistani still evoke Romani culture, and some players may still associate certain abilities [...] with outdated cultural stereotypes". Julie Muncy, for Io9, criticized the "granular changes" to the Vistani people as not very extensive and that "while there's a real opportunity here to do better work—the aforementioned diversity pledge also mentioned future works that will feature the Vistani people and aim to complicate their depictions—starting that work with a fancy collector's edition feels less like a promise to do better and more like a victory lap". Muncy highlighted that the errata and the Revamped edition "sought to undo some of the harmful stereotyping of the Vistani people, along with revising the book's approach to a specific character's disability to avoid ableist stereotypes. [...] While modifications do fix things like the stereotyping of the Vistani people as 'uncivilized' and heavy drinkers, the module still gives the Vistani abilities [...], along with unrevised art that heavily conjures stereotyped imagery of the Romani, leans into tropes that suggest the Romani have mystical, dangerous powers, tropes that have been used in the past to target Romani for persecution".

In 2021, Charlie Hall, for Polygon, wrote, "Those who open up Van Richten's Guide on May 18 will find a very different version of the Vistani. They are described without the primitive veneer of superstition that formerly accompanied them. [...] In addition, their culture is redefined as one steeped in tradition, but also one that looks with hopeful eyes toward its own future. While the Vistani keep their covered wagons and their nomadic lifestyle, their visitations across the many realms of the D&D multiverse are now celebrated, rather than greeted with near-universal suspicion. Most importantly, they are no longer subjugated by one of the game's most powerful villains". Marley King writing for Screenrant noted that the recent "retconning... did little to fix the problematic depiction of the Vistani", noting that while they are now allowed to have non-evil alignments and some controversial descriptions of them as uncivilized drunkards were removed, they still are generally portrayed as "wandering charlatans" with "dark, mysterious powers", including the "Evil Eye".

== Additional reading ==
- Nesmith, Bruce; Hayday, Andria (1990). Realm of Terror. TSR. ISBN 0-88038-853-6.
- Connors, William; Nesmith, Bruce (1992). Forbidden Lore. TSR. ISBN 1-56076-354-X.
- Nesmith, Bruce; Hayday, Andria; Connors, William (1994). Ravenloft Campaign Setting. TSR. ISBN 1-56076-942-4.
- Wise, David (1995). Van Richten's Guide to the Vistani. TSR. ISBN 0-7869-0155-1.
- Kurtz, Steve (1995). The Evil Eye. TSR. ISBN 0-7869-0167-5.
- Connors, William; Miller, Steve (1997). Domains of Dread. TSR/Wizards of the Coast. ISBN 0-7869-0672-3.
- Cermak, Andrew; John Mangrum; Andrew Wyatt (2001). Ravenloft Campaign Setting (3rd ed.). Arthaus. ISBN 1-58846-075-4.
- Mangrum, John; Brian Campbell; Carla Hollar; Rucht Lilavivat; Anthony Pryor; Peter Woodworth; Andrew Wyatt (2003). Ravenloft Dungeon Master's Guide. Arthaus. ISBN 1-58846-084-3.
