= Dungeons & Dragons Online =

- Original cover art
- Developers: Turbine (2006–2016); Standing Stone Games (2016–present)
- Publisher: Daybreak Game Company (Note: The game was formerly published by Atari, Codemasters, and Warner Bros. Interactive Entertainment.)
- Designers: Jason Booth; Dan Ogles; Cardell Kerr; Ken Troop
- Platforms: Microsoft Windows; OS X
- Release: Windows; February 28, 2006; OS X June 25, 2012
- Genre: MMORPG
- Mode: Multiplayer

Dungeons & Dragons Online is a massively multiplayer online role-playing game (MMORPG) developed by Turbine for Microsoft Windows and OS X. The game was originally marketed as Dungeons & Dragons Online: Stormreach. Upon switching to a hybrid free-to-play model it was renamed Dungeons & Dragons Online: Eberron Unlimited. The game was rebranded Dungeons & Dragons Online, with the introduction of Forgotten Realms-related content. Turbine developed Dungeons & Dragons Online as an online adaptation of Dungeons & Dragons (D&D), originally based loosely on the D&D 3.0 rule set. The game is set on the unexplored continent of Xen'drik within the Eberron campaign setting, and in the Kingdom of Cormyr within the Forgotten Realms campaign setting.

== Gameplay ==
Quests are narrated by a Dungeon Master, and some of the early voiceover work was done by Dungeons & Dragon co-creators Gary Gygax and Dave Arneson.

== Development ==
Dungeons & Dragons Online: Stormreach was developed by Turbine over two years. The initial prototype and concept were created by Jason Booth, Dan Ogles, Cardell Kerr, Ken Troop, and Michael Sheidow, in coordination with Wizards of the Coast, the publisher of Dungeons & Dragons. Gary Gygax provided some narration before his death.

=== Release ===
After testing was complete, a special head start event began on February 24 for those who pre-ordered, with the game opening to the public on February 28. As of April 2008, there were less than 100,000 subscribers for the game. In June 2009, Dungeons & Dragons Online reopened beta testing, in preparation for their new free-to-play subscription structure.

The free-to-play business model was introduced with the Eberron Unlimited upgrade in the summer of 2009. After the game went free-to-play, the company said subscriptions increased 40 percent by October 13 of the same year. Engadget noted pros and cons from a player's perspective with the change.

A beta of the OS X version was released on December 17, 2012.

In 2025, the game opened new 64-bit servers and offered free migration for players from old 32-bit servers.

== Post-release modules ==
In-game screenshot detailing the 3D graphics.

By June 2009, Dungeons & Dragons Online was converted to a subscriptionless "free to play" game for players in North America, under the new name Dungeons & Dragons Online: Eberron Unlimited. The level cap was increased to level 20 and free users had access to the majority of game content; some features have to be purchased with Dungeons & Dragons Online points or unlocked through play. There is a VIP access with additional features available, as well as free DDO points. Closed beta registration opened on June 9. The game and contents were free to download on September 1 for VIP members and September 9 for the general North American public.

By December 2016, ongoing development of the game transitioned to a new studio, Standing Stone Games, formed by ex-Turbine staffers. The publishing of the game was transferred from Warner Bros. Interactive Entertainment to Daybreak Game Company. While a reason was not given for the transition, it was assured that the game would continue with new development.

=== Expansions ===
1. Turbine released its first Menace of the Underdark expansion in June 2012. The expansion increased the maximum character level and added the druid class.
2. The Shadowfell Conspiracy was released in August 2013. It increased the maximum character level to 28, added 4 new races (iconic heroes) and new adventure pack located in Cormyr.
3. With the Mists of Ravenloft, released in December 2017, players venture to the lands of Barovia and ultimately fight Strahd von Zarovich. Additional features include the Aasimar race in two flavors, Vistani knife fighter, or Sentient weapons.
4. The Masterminds of Sharn, released in May 2019, sends players to Sharn, the City of Towers. It introduced two variants of the Tiefling race and a new fighting style: dual wielding crossbows.
5. In the Fables of the Feywild, released in November 2020, players travel into the mystical plane of the Feywild. Apart from new adventures among the fey, the update also introduces two variants of the Shifter race, unicorn mounts, and a universal enhancement tree: the Feydark Illusionist.
6. In the mini-expansion released in August 2021 players uncover The Sinister Secret of Saltmarsh. The update also includes the Horizon Walker enhancement tree, granting new options to bow users.
7. The Isle of Dread, released in June 2022, increases the level cap to 32 and introduces two variants of the feline Tabaxi race.
8. In Vecna Unleashed, released in August 2023, players help Morgrave University neutralize the threat posed by Vecna. The mini-expansion brings balance adjustments to several classes and introduces the Machrotechnic epic destiny.
9. The 2024 expansion takes players to the ruins of Myth Drannor to interfere with the plans of the Red Wizards.
10. In The Chill of Ravenloft, released in August 2025, players return to Ravenloft to investigate the Dark Lords in the Domain of Dread Lamordia. The expansion also introduces the Dhampir playable race.

== Reception ==
Reception

Aggregate scores
Aggregator	Score
GameRankings	76%
Metacritic	74/100

Review scores
Publication	Score
Eurogamer	8/10
GameSpot	7.5/10
GamesRadar+	7/10
GameTrailers	8/10
IGN	7.5/10

IGN ranked Dungeons & Dragons Online No. 11 on their list of "The Top 11 Dungeons & Dragons Games of All Time" in 2014. The magazine described as the "first MMORPG to prove that free-to-play payment plans were viable alternatives to the then-dominant subscription model". Robert Hold of the NPR gave it a positive review, although he said some of the exposition seemed obvious.

=== Awards ===
- Freebie Award: Best Free-to-play-MMORPG (2009) – RPGLand.com RPGs of the Year 2009
- Best Free to Play Game (2009) – Tentonhammer.com Best of 2009 Awards
- Best Multiplayer Game – 2006 British Academy Video Games Awards
- Best Persistent World Game – IGN.com Best of 2006 Awards
- Nominee – Massively Multiplayer Game of the Year – 10th Annual Interactive Achievement Awards
- Third Prize, Best Graphics (Les JOL d'Or 2006)
- Third Prize – Public's Award (Les JOL d'Or 2006)

== Lawsuits ==
On August 24, 2009, Turbine, Inc. filed a lawsuit against Atari claiming a breach of a licensing agreement for Dungeons & Dragons. The suit alleged six counts over six years, including consistent breaches of contract, a lack of promotion and distribution, and attempting to gain additional money from Turbine's licensing of the D&D properties. Furthermore, Turbine claimed that many of the maneuvers by Atari were designed to either undercut the upcoming launch of Dungeons & Dragons: Eberron Unlimited or help Atari launch its own competing MMO. Atari filed a motion to dismiss the lawsuit, and also filed a separate complaint to recover money owed to Atari resulting from an independent third party audit of Turbine. The case was settled out of court in 2011.

Ontario-based web services company Treehouse Avatar Technologies Inc. filed a patent infringement lawsuit against Turbine, Inc., which claimed Dungeons & Dragons Online had violated United States Patent No. 8,180,858 (Method And System For Presenting Data Over A Network Based On Network User Choices And Collecting Real-Time Data Related To Said Choices), which was awarded on May 15, 2012 to Treehouse's parent company WiLAN. Turbine settled the lawsuit by licensing WiLAN's technology.
