= Dungeons & Dragons (IDW Publishing) =

Comic book series by IDW Publishing

- Issue 0

Publication information
- Publisher: IDW Publishing
- Schedule: Irregular
- Format: Ongoing and limited series
- Genre: Action/adventure, fantasy, magic, swashbuckler
- Publication date: August 2010 – April 2024
- No. of issues: 104

Dungeons & Dragons is a series of comic books published by IDW Publishing, under the license from Hasbro and Wizards of the Coast, based on the Dungeons & Dragons (D&D) fantasy role-playing game. From 2010 to 2024, IDW Publishing released two Dungeons & Dragons ongoing series, sixteen Dungeons & Dragons limited series, three crossover series, two annuals and a graphic novel.

It was originally based on the 4th Edition core setting of D&D. Starting with the Legends of Baldur's Gate mini-series in 2014, the comics have been tied to the 5th Edition core setting.

In July 2024, Wizards of the Coast announced that Dark Horse Comics will gain the Dungeons & Dragons comics license in 2025.

== Ongoing and limited series ==
=== Fell's Five ===
Set in Nentir Vale, the first ongoing series of Dungeons & Dragons started in August 2010 with an issue 0 that introduced the major characters. It then continued with issue 1 in November of that year. 16 issues were published with the last issue being released in February 2012. The series was written by John Rogers and illustrated by Andrea Di Vito, Denis Medri, Horacio Domingues and Juanan. The collection includes three adventures for D&D 4th edition, with encounters from the story; SP-1 Bad day, SP-2 Hide in plain sight, SP-1 1 It goes horribly right.

=== Dark Sun ===
Dark Sun is a five-issue limited series that was released from January–May 2011 based on the Dark Sun campaign setting. It was written by Alex Irvine with art by Peter Bergting.

=== The Legend of Drizzt: Neverwinter Tales ===
The Legend of Drizzt: Neverwinter Tales, also a five-issue mini-series, started in August 2011. It was written by R.A. Salvatore and based on his famous D&D character, Drizzt Do'Urden, from the Forgotten Realms setting.

=== Eberron ===
A two-issue mini-series, Infestation 2: Dungeons & Dragons, was published in February 2012 as part of the IDW-wide Infes2ation crossover. The series is based on the Eberron campaign setting. It was written by Paul Crilley with art by Valerio Schiti, Livio Ramondelli and Menton J. Matthews III (credited as menton3). Dungeons & Dragons Annual, published in April 2012, was also set in Eberron. It was written by Paul Crilley with art by Paco Diaz and Menton J. Matthews III (credited as menton3). Then in June 2015, an Eberron themed trade paperback was published - Dungeons & Dragons: Abraxis Wren of Eberron collects Infestation 2: Dungeons & Dragons #1-2, the 2012 Annual and the Eye of the Wolf comic. The Eye of the Wolf comic was originally published in 2006 by Devil's Due Publishing and was written by Keith Baker with art by Chris Lie and Rob Ruffolo.

=== Forgotten Realms ===
Forgotten Realms is an ongoing series that released five issues between May and November 2012; it was based on original characters in the Forgotten Realms setting. It was written by Ed Greenwood, creator of the setting, with art by Lee Ferguson and Sal Buscema.

=== Forgotten Realms: Cutter ===
Forgotten Realms: Cutter is a five-issue mini-series that started in April 2013. It was written by R. A. Salvatore and Geno Salvatore with art by David Baldeon and Steve Ellis.

=== A Darkened Wish ===
A Darkened Wish is a Forgotten Realms five-issue mini-series set in the Sea of Swords (a region in Faerûn that separates the Sword Coast from the Nelanther Isles and the Moonshae Isles) written by B. Dave Walters with art by Tess Fowler. The first issue was published in March 2019. In 2020, Walters was the Dungeon Master for A Darkened Wish, an official actual play web series, which was based on the comic; it ran for 30 episodes and ended in 2021.

=== At the Spine of the World ===
A four-issue mini-series set in the Icewind Dale region of Faerûn, entitled Dungeons & Dragons: At the Spine of the World, began in November 2020. It was written by AJ Mendez and Aimee Garcia with art by Martin Coccolo and colors by Katrina Mae Hao. Its release corresponded with the release of the adventure module Icewind Dale: Rime of the Frostmaiden (2021).

=== Ravenloft: Orphan of Agony Isle ===
A four-issue limited series by writer Casey Gilly and artist Bayleigh Underwood which was released between June and October 2022. The series focuses on the mad scientist Viktra Mordenheim, the Darklord of Ravenloft's Lamordia domain introduced in Van Richten's Guide to Ravenloft (2021), and Miranda, a woman without memory who was resurrected by Mordenheim.

=== Dungeons & Dragons: Honor Among Thieves—The Feast of the Moon ===
The Feast of the Moon is a 96-page graphic novel which serves as a prequel to the film Dungeons & Dragons: Honor Among Thieves (2023). The graphic novel focuses on Edgin (the bard played by Chris Pine in the film) as he and his band of thieves end up in conflict with both the Bandit King and a local town's inhabitants. It also includes a back-up story focused on Xenk (the paladin played by Regé-Jean Page) and the Helmet of Disjunction. It was written by Jeremy Lambert and Ellen Boener and drawn by Eduardo Ferigato and Guillermo Sanna and was released on March 7, 2023 before the release of the film on March 31, 2023.

=== Dungeons & Dragons: Saturday Morning Adventures ===
A four-issue limited series based on the 1983-85 Dungeons & Dragons animated TV series was released starting in March 2023, written by David M. Booher and Sam Maggs and drawn by George Kambadais. IDW Endless Summer Dungeons & Dragons Saturday Morning Adventures #1, as part of IDW's Endless Summer annuals, was published in August 2023; it was written by Booher with art by Jack Lawrence.

A sequel four-issue limited series, titled Dungeons & Dragons: Saturday Morning Adventures II, continues the adventures of Dungeons & Dragons: Saturday Morning Adventures (2023) and was released starting in January 2024. It was written by David M. Booher and drawn by George Kambadais. In February 2026, Wizards of the Coast and Dark Horse Books announced a new hardcover collected edition of the entire IDW Dungeons & Dragons: Saturday Morning Adventures run. It is scheduled for release in August 2026.

=== Dungeons & Dragons: Fortune Finder ===
Dungeons & Dragons: Fortune Finder is a Planescape-themed limited series that released five issues between November 2023 and March 2024. The series starts in Sigil and is focused on an amnesiac hero known as Finder. It was written by Jim Zub and drawn by Jose Jaro.

== Legends of Baldur's Gate ==
Trade paperback cover of Legends of Baldur's Gate (2015) with art by Sarah Stone.

Set in the Forgotten Realms setting, Legends of Baldur's Gate is a five-issue limited series that started in October 2014. It was written by Jim Zub with art by Max Dunbar and Sarah Stone. Jim Zub "has had a hand in nearly every D&D comic since" this limited series was published.

Five sequel limited series have been published:

=== Shadows of the Vampire ===
Shadows of the Vampire is a five-issue sequel to Legends of Baldur's Gate written by Jim Zub with art by Nelson Daniel and Max Dunbar. It features Strahd von Zarovich as the main villain and the realm of Ravenloft as its main setting. It started publishing in May 2016.

=== Frost Giant’s Fury ===
Frost Giant’s Fury is the third five-issue mini-series centered on the group of heroes from Baldur’s Gate written by Jim Zub with art by Netho Diaz. It started publishing in January 2017.

=== Evil at Baldur’s Gate ===
Evil at Baldur’s Gate is the fourth five-issue mini-series following the heroes from Baldur’s Gate written by Jim Zub and Steven Cummings with art by Dean Kotz, John Wycough, Harvey Tolibao, Jim Zub and Francesco Mortarino. It started publishing in April 2018.

=== Infernal Tides ===
Infernal Tides is the fifth five-issue mini-series involving the heroes from Baldur’s Gate. It was published in November 2019 and written by Jim Zub with art by Max Dunbar.

=== Mindbreaker ===
Mindbreaker is the sixth five-issue mini-series involving the heroes from Baldur’s Gate; the series acts as a prelude to the video game Baldur's Gate III. It is written by Jim Zub with art by Eduardo Mello and started publishing in October 2021.

== Crossovers ==
=== Rick and Morty vs. Dungeons & Dragons ===
In 2018, publishers IDW Publishing and Oni Press presented a crossover between the adult animated sitcom Rick and Morty comic book and Dungeons & Dragons. The four-issue crossover comic was co-written by Jim Zub and Patrick Rothfuss, with art by Troy Little, starting its own publishing in August 2018.

The Rick and Morty vs Dungeons and Dragons Deluxe Edition was nominated for the 2022 "Best Graphic Album—Reprint" Eisner Award.

=== Rick and Morty vs. Dungeons & Dragons Chapter II: Painscape ===
A four-issue sequel mini-series was published in September 2019. It was written by Jim Zub and Sarah Stern with art by Troy Little.

=== Stranger Things and Dungeons & Dragons ===
A five-issue crossover comic with the Netflix television series Stranger Things was published by IDW and Dark Horse Comics on November 4, 2020. It was co-written by Jim Zub and Jody Houser with art by Diego Galindo, colors by Michele Assarasakorn, and letters by Nate Piekos.

== Reception ==
Dungeons & Dragons was #7 on CBR's "10 Best Comic Books & Graphic Novels Any D&D Player Should Read" list — the article states "it's a 15-issue comic book series that unfortunately got canceled. Don't be put off by that though– Fell's Five is highly-rated and features interesting characters each complementing and opposing the other, making them a dysfunctional party that somehow still works and gets through the skin of their teeth".

In his review of the ongoing Dungeons & Dragons series, Chris Sims, for ComicsAlliance, wrote that John Rogers has "devoted the book not just to a great fantasy storyline [...] but some of the strongest and most engaging character work I've seen in a while. [...] The amazing thing is that Adric Fell and his crew are actually good characters in their own right, while still being completely believable as being the inhabitants of a world build entirely on the rigid, arcane rules that govern a roleplaying game. It's unbelievably tricky to pull both of those off at once, but Rogers does it. [...] It's all stuff that fans of D&D (and the fantasy literature it draws inspiration from) are all familiar with, but the way they interact with each other makes it feel fresh and fun, and it's perfectly complimented [sic] by Di Vito's expressive art. [...] In short, it's the story of the best D&D campaign ever, as played by the group I wish I was a part of".

Reviews of Dungeons & Dragons: Days of Endless Adventure, which collects the Legends of Baldur’s Gate, Shadows of the Vampire, and Frost Giant’s Fury trades, were generally positive. SJ Twining, for Screen Rant, wrote: "Days of Endless Adventure is the perfect illustrated introduction to the world’s greatest roleplaying game. [...] Legends of Baldur’s Gate faithfully recreates the Forgotten Realms in continuity and detail, drawing upon the legendary campaign setting’s lore and adapting it with aspects highlighted in Dungeons & Dragons 5th Edition". Gavin Sheehan, for Bleeding Cool, wrote in his review: "You're getting 15 issues total with nearly three years worth of storytelling. Each set serves a very specific purpose in the canon of the characters you're introduced to. The first set brings about proper introductions and forming up the party of characters and dealing with a crisis, the second set gives you a familiar villain to Dungeons & Dragons lore, and the third, quite frankly, goes off the rails on purpose with an insane adventure that few mortals would ever dare tread into. [...] The back of the book features a mix of official artwork from Dungeons & Dragons' various adventure books and promotional material, as well as alternative artwork for certain scenes and even a few sketches of the characters as you can see the work that went into making them come to life. You also get character sheets for all five of the main party characters [...]. Its a slice of something different that doesn't read like other adventure comics out there, which fits perfectly with the motif of the tabletop RPG franchise it's based on".

== Collected editions ==
The series has been collected in the following trade paperbacks:

Title	Material collected	Date	ISBN
The Legend of Drizzt: Omnibus Volume 1	The Legend of Drizzt: Homeland #1-3, The Legend of Drizzt: Exile #1-3 and The Legend of Drizzt: Sojourn #1-3	September 2011	ISBN 1-60010-997-7
Dungeons & Dragons Volume 1: Shadowplague	Dungeons & Dragons #0-5	June 19, 2012	ISBN 1-60010-922-5
Dark Sun: Ianto's Tomb	Dungeons & Dragons: Dark Sun #1-5	August 14, 2012	ISBN 1-60010-996-9
The Legend of Drizzt: Omnibus Volume 2	The Legend of Drizzt: The Crystal Shard #1-3, The Legend of Drizzt: Streams of Silver #1-3 and The Legend of Drizzt: The Halfling's Gem #1-3	September 2012	ISBN 1-61377-395-1
Dungeons & Dragons Volume 2: First Encounters	Dungeons & Dragons #6-11	December 18, 2012	ISBN 1-61377-084-7
The Legend of Drizzt: Neverwinter Tales	Neverwinter Tales #1-5	March 2012	ISBN 1-61377-156-8
Dungeons & Dragons Volume 3: Down	Dungeons & Dragons #12-15	May 8, 2012	ISBN 1-61377-178-9
Forgotten Realms	Forgotten Realms #1-5	January 15, 2013	ISBN 1-61377-825-2
Forgotten Realms: Cutter	Forgotten Realms: Cutter #1-5	December 17, 2013	ISBN 1-61377-792-2
Dungeons & Dragons: Fell's Five	Dungeons & Dragons #0-15	February 25, 2014	ISBN 978-1613778463
Legends of Baldur's Gate	Legends of Baldur's Gate #1-5	May 19, 2015	ISBN 1-63140-250-1
Abraxis Wren of Eberron	Infestation 2: Dungeons & Dragons #1-2, 2012 Annual and Eye of the Wolf, 2006 Eye of the Wolf (originally published by Devil's Due Publishing)	June 2015	ISBN 978-1-63140-265-4
Forgotten Realms Omnibus	Forgotten Realms #1-5, Forgotten Realms: Cutter #1-5, Neverwinter Tales #1-5	February 2016	ISBN 978-1631404641
Shadows of the Vampire	Shadows of the Vampire #1-5	November 2016	ISBN 1-63140-766-X
Frost Giant's Fury	Frost Giant’s Fury #1-5	October 2017	ISBN 1-63140-928-X
Evil at Baldur's Gate	Evil at Baldur’s Gate #1-5	November 2018	ISBN 1-68405-335-8
Rick and Morty vs. Dungeons & Dragons	Rick and Morty vs. Dungeons & Dragons #1-4	March 2019	ISBN 978-1-68405-416-9
Rick and Morty vs. Dungeons & Dragons: Chapter II: Painscape	Rick and Morty vs. Dungeons & Dragons: Chapter II: Painscape #1-4	March 3, 2020	ISBN 978-1620106907
Dungeons & Dragons: Days of Endless Adventure	Legends of Baldur's Gate, Shadows of the Vampire and Frost Giant's Fury	March 23, 2020	ISBN 978-1-68405-275-2
A Darkened Wish	A Darkened Wish #1-5	April 8, 2020	ISBN 978-1684055388
Infernal Tides	Infernal Tides #1-5	February 2021	ISBN 978-1684056293
Stranger Things and Dungeons & Dragons	Stranger Things and Dungeons & Dragons #1-4	July 6, 2021	ISBN 978-1506721071
At the Spine of the World	Dungeons & Dragons: At the Spine of the World #1-4	July 27, 2021	ISBN 978-1-68405-791-7
Rick and Morty vs. Dungeons & Dragons: Deluxe Edition	Rick and Morty vs. Dungeons & Dragons #1-4 & Rick and Morty vs. Dungeons & Dragons: Chapter II: Painscape #1-4	September 7, 2021	ISBN 978-1-62010-875-8
Dungeons & Dragons: Best of Minsc & Boo	Legends of Baldur’s Gate #1, Shadows of the Vampire #2, Evil at Baldur’s Gate #1, and Evil at Baldur’s Gate #5	April 13, 2022	
Mindbreaker	Mindbreaker #1-5	July 19, 2022	ISBN 978-1-68405-888-4
Dungeons & Dragons: Honor Among Thieves - The Feast of the Moon		March 7, 2023	ISBN 978-1-68405-911-9
Ravenloft: Orphan of Agony Isle	Ravenloft: Orphan of Agony Isle #1-4	March 14, 2023	ISBN 978-1684059560
Dungeons & Dragons: Nights of Endless Adventure	Evil at Baldur's Gate, Infernal Tides and Mindbreaker	October 2023	ISBN 9798887240466
Dungeons & Dragons: Saturday Morning Adventures	Dungeons & Dragons: Saturday Morning Adventures #1-4	October 31, 2023	ISBN 978-1-68405-943-0
Dungeons & Dragons: Saturday Morning Adventures II	Dungeons & Dragons: Saturday Morning Adventures II #1-4	June 4, 2024	ISBN 979-8887241418
Dungeons & Dragons: Fortune Finder	Dungeons & Dragons Fortune Finder #1-5	June 4, 2024	ISBN 979-8887241456
Dungeons & Dragons: Animated Adventures Library Edition	Dungeons & Dragons: Saturday Morning Adventures #1-4, Dungeons & Dragons: Saturday Morning Adventures: Endless Summer, Dungeons & Dragons: Saturday Morning Adventures II #1-4	August 4, 2026	ISBN 9781506753478

== Reprints ==
IDW began printing trade paperback collections of earlier Dungeons & Dragons series by other publishers starting in March 2011.

A list of reprints:

- Dungeons & Dragons: Forgotten Realms Classics (collecting the DC Comics Forgotten Realms series)
  - Volume 1 (collects Forgotten Realms #1-8, 204 pages, March 2011, ISBN 978-1-60010-863-1)
  - Volume 2 (collects Forgotten Realms #9-14 and TSR Worlds Annual, 224 pages, October 2011, ISBN 978-1-61377-014-6)
  - Volume 3 (collects Forgotten Realms #15-18 and Annual #1, 164 pages, May 2012, ISBN 978-1-61377-201-0)
  - Volume 4 (collects Forgotten Realms #19-25, 182 pages, August 2014, ISBN 978-1-61377-485-4)
- Dungeons & Dragons Classics (collecting the DC Comics Advanced Dungeons & Dragons series)
  - Volume 1 (collects Advanced Dungeons & Dragons #1-8, 200 pages, May 2011, ISBN 978-1-60010-895-2)
  - Volume 2 (collects Advanced Dungeons & Dragons #9-18, 256 pages, November 2011, ISBN 978-1-61377-064-1)
  - Volume 3 (collects Advanced Dungeons & Dragons #19-26 and 1990 Annual, 260 pages, June 2012, ISBN 978-1-61377-219-5)
  - Volume 4 (collects Advanced Dungeons & Dragons #27-36, 268 pages, February 2015, ISBN 978-1-61377-560-8)
- Dungeons & Dragons: Forgotten Realms - The Legend of Drizzt Omnibus (collecting the Devil's Due Publishing Forgotten Realms: The Legend of Drizzt series)
  - Volume 1 (collects Homeland #1-3, Exile #1-3, and Sojourn #1-3, 424 pages, September 2011, ISBN 978-1-60010-997-3)
  - Volume 2 (collects The Crystal Shard #1-3, Streams of Silver #1-3, and The Halfling's Gem #1-3, 460 pages, September 2012, ISBN 978-1-61377-395-6)
- Dungeons & Dragons: Fell's Five (collects Dungeons & Dragons: Fell's Five #0-15, 432 pages, June 29, 2021, ISBN 9781684058044)

== See also ==
- List of comics based on Hasbro properties
