= The Evil Eye (Ravenloft) =

Dungeons & Dragons adventure module

- Character levels: 4–6
- First published: 1996

The Evil Eye is an adventure module for the 2nd edition of the Advanced Dungeons & Dragons fantasy role-playing game, published in 1996.

== Plot summary ==
The Evil Eye is an adventure consisting of six separate episodes, which do not need to be played linearly. The first episode can take place anywhere in any campaign, and functions as a door into Ravenloft and introduces the Vistani. Once in Ravenloft, the player characters encounter the principal characters, each with their own secret agenda. The main plot involves Gabrielle Aderre, lord of Invidia, and mother of Molocchio. Gabrielle had betrayed her mother and as a result was cursed to be betrayed in turn by her own child in the future. Molocchio has supernatural powers, which will ultimately destroy everything once he is fully mature, and the Vistani need the help of the player characters to stop him. The adventure also has several sub-plots involving themes such as tragic love and serial killers.

== Publication history ==
The Evil Eye was designed by Steve Kurtz, and published by TSR in 1996. The cover art was by Jeff Easley with interior art by Mark Nelson.

== Reception ==
Cliff Ramshaw reviewed The Evil Eye for Arcane magazine, rating it an 8 out of 10 overall. He described The Evil Eye as "Not so much a dungeon bash as an opportunity for strong roleplaying and character interaction", and "the perfect introduction to the Ravenloft campaign world". He felt that the six adventure episodes "all boast a wealth of imaginative and atmospheric detail as well as numerous hooks for developing adventures at tangents to the one described". Ramshaw concluded his review by saying, "The Evil Eye is a splendid scenario, bursting with fascinating characters and plotlines - highly recommended."
