= Soulstone =

Soulstone may refer to:

- Soulstone, a fictional object used to store an Eldar's soul in the Warhammer 40,000 universe
- Soulstone, a fictional jewel or stone used to trap and contain a demon's soul in the Diablo universe
- Soulstone, a fictional item in the World of Warcraft universe that is created by the warlock class, which allows the character whom it is cast upon to bring themselves back to life
- Soul Stone, a fictional object in Dungeons & Dragons Online used to bring someone back to life
- Soul Stone, a fictional item in the Marvel Cinematic Universe that has the ability to manipulate the soul and essence of a person
- Soulstone, a currency utilized in Soulstone Survivors.
