= The Created =

Dungeons & Dragons adventure module

- Character levels: 2-4
- First published: 1993

The Created is an adventure module for the 2nd edition of the Advanced Dungeons & Dragons fantasy role-playing game, published in 1993.

== Plot summary ==
In this AD&D Ravenloft one-shot adventure, the player characters attend a festival in a village before it drifts into the demiplane of Ravenloft. The character encounter trouble with killer marionettes, and must use their wits.

== Publication history ==
RM2 The Created was written by Bruce Nesmith, and published by TSR. The cover artist was Brom, and the interior artist was Dave Simons.

== Reception ==
Allen Varney reviewed The Created for Dragon magazine #201 (January 1994). He liked the adventure "for its chilling premise, elegant craft, and atmospheric staging", and called the village "right out of Pinocchio". While he called the plot "spartan", he noted that the execution "makes the difference". Varney concluded by saying, "Nesmith, one of TSR's most talented staffers, shines in this introductory adventure. It should have come in the Ravenloft boxed set!"

DieHard GameFan said that "Is The Created one of the lesser Ravenloft adventures from the Second Edition era? Yes, there's no doubting that. It takes a very specific DM AND gaming group to make evil puppets work in any form remotely close to scary. Still, if you can find that right mix or you just want a weird adventure to make your friends laugh with, The Created isn't a bad choice."
