= Strahd von Zarovich =

Fictional roleplaying character

Count Strahd von Zarovich
- Ravenloft character
- Strahd von Zarovich as portrayed in the comic Shadows of the Vampire illustrated by Nelson Daniel and Max Dunbar.

In-universe information
- Species: Human vampire
- Gender: Male
- Title: Count
- Nationality: Barovia
- Class: Fighter/Necromancer
- Alignment: Lawful evil
- Universe: Ravenloft

Count Strahd von Zarovich is a fictional character originally appearing as the feature villain in the highly popular Advanced Dungeons and Dragons adventure module I6: Ravenloft. Later, this character and his world would be explored in follow-up modules, novels, and the Ravenloft campaign setting. Within this setting, Strahd is the first and best-known of Ravenloft's darklords. He is a powerful ancient vampire. He is also a master necromancer, a skilled warrior, and the unquestioned ruler of the domain of Barovia.

== Creative origins ==
In 1978, Tracy and Laura Hickman wrote adventures that would eventually be published as the Dungeon & Dragons modules Pharaoh and Ravenloft. Strahd was created by the Hickmans "after Tracy returned home from a disappointing session of D&D. Back in First Edition, the game was less of a storytelling game. It mostly involved charting randomized dungeons on graph paper and fighting whatever creatures were inside for their gold and experience points. In one of those random rooms was a vampire, which immediately stood out to Tracy. It didn't make sense to him why a creature like a vampire was just sitting around in a random dungeon with oozes, goblins, and zombies. So he and his wife set out to create a vampire villain with fleshed-out motivations and history". When the Hickmans began work on Ravenloft, they felt the vampire archetype had become overused, trite, and mundane, and decided to create a frightening version of the creature for the module. They play-tested it with a group of players every Halloween for five years on their own game system with the adventure titled Vampyr. However, the Hickmans kept being asked about their "Ravenloft game", and so the "Ravenloft" name stuck. The duo eventually caught the attention of D&D's original publishers. They were hired to adapt it into the First Edition of Advanced Dungeons & Dragons and was released as Module I6: Ravenloft in 1983 by TSR.

When creating Strahd, the Hickmans' vampire research started with an image of Bela Lugosi from 1931 before they explored older stories such as Bram Stoker's Dracula (1897), John William Polidori's The Vampyre (1819), and Mary Shelley's Frankenstein (1818). "What the Hickmans found was that the romantic vampire of the earliest years of the genre was not just a spouse beater but a spouse killer, the archetype of abuse in the worst kind of destructive codependency". In 2016, Tracy Hickman said, "Strahd came directly from the roots of vampire lore. The origins of the modern vampire spring from feminine cautionary tales warning women away from the 'bluebeard' archetype. It was essential to understand this in order to properly construct him".

== Publication history ==
=== 1st edition ===
The adventure module I6: Ravenloft (1983) introduced Strahd von Zarovich, and centers upon the efforts of the player characters to help a young Barovian woman, Ireena Kolyana, escape the dreadful fate of so many others on whom "the devil Strahd" has cast his eye over the generations. The setting includes not only castle Ravenloft itself, but also the nearby village of Barovia, and a camp of gypsies led by Madame Eva, who had formed a kind of alliance with the vampire. Through the course of the adventure, players have the opportunity to learn Strahd's backstory and discover that Ireena is herself the reincarnation of Tatyana. Strahd himself is noted as being the first truly well-developed villain to appear in the AD&D game system, being fully capable of changing the course of events to suit his own evil ends.

The immediate popularity of Ravenloft proved sufficient to warrant a sequel, I10: Ravenloft II: The House on Gryphon Hill (1986), again casting Strahd von Zarovich in the central, villainous role. Set in the quiet, seaside town of Mordentshire, players of this adventure are confronted by two Strahds—the same monstrous vampire from Ravenloft (now referred to as the Creature), and a very human counterpart, known as the Alchemist. Shannon Appelcline, author of Designers & Dragons, highlighted the confusing continuity of Strahd's return in this module and that the second module suggests "the original 'Ravenloft' could be a dream. Or maybe this one is. Or maybe they're alternate realities. Combining them into one chronology doesn't seem possible". Additionally, "the original 'Ravenloft' has been the favored background for Strahd in more recent appearances".

The plot of Ravenloft II requires the players to discover the true nature of the vampiric threat afflicting Mordentshire, and then to discover the secret identity of the Creature and destroy him. Nothing of note is added to original nature or history of Strahd von Zarovich in the course of the adventure, though a number of characters of lesser importance, including the lich Azalin make their first appearance in this publication as well.

=== 2nd edition ===
Strahd von Zarovich from the cover of I, Strahd: Memoirs of a Vampire

Though Ravenloft II did not enjoy the wide acclaim of the original, the phenomenon of Ravenloft proved sufficient for TSR, Inc. to place it and Strahd von Zarovich at the heart of a new product series released in 1990, Ravenloft: Realm of Terror — an entire campaign setting based on the Gothic horror theme of Ravenloft. After being featured in the Ravenloft setting, Strahd became one of the most popular villains appearing in Dungeons & Dragons. Game designer Rick Swan commented on Strahd: "A high-level necromancer of incomparable cunning, Strahd holds his own with Count Dracula as one of horror's most memorable bloodsuckers." The designers of Ravenloft: Realm of Terror decided to focus on campaign atmosphere which resulted in the Ravenloft setting becoming the "demiplane of dread". This demiplane now "included many horrific lands, including the lands of Barovia and Mordent from the two 'Ravenloft' modules. Strahd's backstory from the original 'Ravenloft' was even incorporated into the story of how Ravenloft, the demiplane of dread, came to be".

In 1991, Strahd was a main character in two novels: Vampire of the Mists and Knight of the Black Rose. His official "autobiography" has been presented in two novels by P. N. Elrod: I, Strahd: Memoirs of a Vampire (1993) and I, Strahd, the War Against Azalin (1998). There are many similarities between the character of Strahd von Zarovich and that of fellow fictional vampire Barnabas Collins from the American 1960's-1970's soap opera Dark Shadows, as P.N. Elrod mentions on her personal Livejournal blog.

Strahd appeared in multiple adventure modules set in the new campaign setting and received "special attention in the final adventures of the Grand Conjunction sequence — RQ3: "From the Shadows" (1992) and RM1: "Roots of Evil" (1993)". Roots of Evil added additional details to Strahd's background; such as, the introduction of the arcanaloth Inajira with whom Strahd "made a pact in far-gone times". The tenth Ravenloft adventure, RM4: House of Strahd (1993), was a revamp of the original Ravenloft module with the following changes: it was updated to the AD&D 2e ruleset, Barovia lore was brought in line with the lore of the campaign setting, and Strahd was given a power boost "to reflect his status as a Dark Lord".

In 1994, Strahd returned in the second edition Ravenloft Campaign Setting boxed set which was a revision of the Ravenloft: Realm of Terror (1990) boxed set. Strahd was a main character in the DreamForge Intertainment video game Ravenloft: Strahd's Possession (1994). Strahd also appears in the PlayStation game Iron & Blood: Warriors of Ravenloft (1996) and can be unlocked as a playable character via a secret code.

=== 3rd and 3.5 edition ===
In 2001, White Wolf published the 3rd edition Ravenloft Campaign Setting which included a detailed timeline of Strahd's history. Dragon #315 (January 2004) featured a 3rd edition stat block for Strahd. Expedition to Castle Ravenloft (2006) was released after the Ravenloft publishing license reverted to Wizards of the Coast. This 3.5 edition update of the original Ravenloft module featured Strahd "front and center in the first chapter".

=== 4th edition ===
In 2010, Strahd made his board game debut in Castle Ravenloft Board Game. While a 4th edition update to the Ravenloft setting was announced at Gen Con 2010, the product was never released. Strahd's appearances were limited to official magazine articles, such as, Dungeon #207 "Fair Barovia" (October 2012) and Dragon #416 "History Check: Strahd and Van Richten" (October 2012).

=== 5th edition ===
Strahd returned as the featured villain in the 2016 adventure module Curse of Strahd for D&D fifth edition. On Strahd's role as the module's villain, Chris Perkins said, "in Gothic horror fiction, the villain's torment is often self-inflicted; the villain becomes, ironically, a victim of their own monstrous nature and horrible acts. [...] He is a malignant narcissist trapped by his malignant narcissism – forever alone, forever feared and unable to change. He must be destroyed because salvation is beyond him. [...] In horror fiction, the villain is framed as inhumanity personified, often serving as a cautionary tale: once you lose your humanity, you can never get it back. Other fantasy villains aren't usually burdened with that kind of terrifying reality".

On the module's development process, Perkins said, "the Hickmans envisioned Strahd differently than he's depicted in the original Ravenloft adventure. Their image didn't match the Bela Legosi [sic] vampire quite so much. Tracy found an old daguerreotype [an early type of photograph captured on a silvered copper plate] [sic] that captured the look of Strahd in his mind, and we used that image as a reference to create a new look for the vampire". One of Tracy Hickman's objectives when working on Curse of Strahd "was to bring vampire folklore back to its roots". Tracy Hickman said, "Vampires have strayed from their original role in cautionary tales, which warned women about monsters and thereby empowered them. Strahd is a classic abusive monster who is, at his root, selfish. The tale is timeless and has nothing to do with some of the recent and harmful versions of glittering romance that vampires have appeared in". Strahd is then the villain in the limited series comic Dungeons and Dragons: Shadows of the Vampire (2016) written by Jim Zub, and illustrated by Max Dunbar and Nelson Daniel.

Strahd is included in the Barovia section of Van Richten's Guide to Ravenloft (2021), a campaign setting book which is focused on the various Domains of Dread. However, his stat block from Curse of Strahd (2016) is not reprinted in this book. He then appears in the novel Ravenloft: Heir of Strahd (2025), by Delilah S. Dawson, which is the first Ravenloft novel to be published in 17 years.

== Fictional character biography ==
A man of noble birth, Strahd spent much of his life serving causes of goodness and law, most notably as a warrior and leader of armies. Years of such service took their toll upon him however, and by the time he reached middle age, Strahd came to believe he had squandered his life and his youth. With this dark mood upon him, he came to conquer the region known as Barovia, and assumed lordship there, taking as his residence the pre-existing castle known as Ravenloft. From this position of power and security, he called for members of his family "long unseated from their ancestral thrones" to join him, including a younger brother named Sergei.

Some time after this reunion, the Count himself fell in love with a young Barovian woman, Tatyana, though she rejected his affections in favor of the younger Sergei. Filled with despair and jealousy, and brooding a growing hatred for Sergei, Strahd sought magical means to restore his youth. In a moment of desperate frustration, he "made a pact with death - a pact of blood." On the day of Sergei and Tatyana's wedding, Strahd murdered his brother and confessed his love to Tatyana, but overcome with grief, she fled from him, hurling herself to her death from the balcony of Castle Ravenloft. Strahd himself was shot down by the arrows of the castle guard. Even so, he did not die, but went on to rule the land of Barovia as a vampire. Immediately afterward, the Mists of Ravenloft drew Strahd to the Demiplane of Dread.

Strahd's backstory was further refined for such that he unwittingly became a vampire as a result of a pact between himself and an unknown entity (Strahd claims it to be Death).

Strahd has ruled his domain for the longest of any darklord, and as such his knowledge of the workings of Ravenloft are without equal. When Strahd chooses to close the borders of his lands, poisonous mists arise and suffocate anyone attempting to pass through them. There are only two ways to avoid the poisonous fog: immunity to poison (magic does not help, but creatures that are innately immune to poison, like elementals, constructs, and undead, have nothing to fear), or by ceasing the attempt to escape. In addition, the Vistani know a secret antidote which renders the drinker immune to the closed border. This fog permanently rings the village of Barovia as well.

Strahd's curse is that although he is absolute lord and master of Barovia, to the point where he can enter private homes unbidden because he owns them, once every generation he will meet a woman whom he believes is Tatyana reincarnated. He always tries to woo her, but the scene of his damnation is replayed, and the woman inevitably dies. Strahd is perhaps the most difficult of all darklords to face. His mastery of necromancy is so great he has produced a kind of "super-zombie", one that is capable of seeing invisible, regenerating like a troll and whose appendages continue to fight on when severed. Strahd has had to battle at least two darklords who had entered his domain in the past; Azalin Rex the lich, and Lord Soth the death knight.

When Lord Soth was in Barovia, Strahd realized that Soth's power as truly a match for his the moment Soth arrived in Castle Ravenloft. Armies of Strahd's servants fell before Lord Soth, and the havoc and damage caused by Soth caused even Strahd to waver. To be rid of Lord Soth from Barovia, Strahd had to give that which Soth had searched for, the traitorous retainer Caradoc, for fear of Lord Soth causing more damage to his beloved land. When the Ravenloft campaign setting was developed, the events of Ravenloft II were retconned so that Strahd was present and disguised as a human alchemist, and did not die at the module's conclusion.

== Reception ==
Strahd was named as one of the greatest villains in Dungeons & Dragons history in the final issue of Dragon magazine. Strahd appeared on the 2018 Screen Rant top list at #15 on "Dungeons & Dragons: The 15 Most Powerful Villains, Ranked", and Scott Baird highlighted that "The fact that he is a vampire means that there are numerous methods by which Strahd can be defeated, which is to say nothing of the powerful anti-zombie abilities that are available to certain Dungeons & Dragons classes." Strahd was also #8 on Game Rant's 2020 "10 Must-Have NPCs In Dungeons & Dragons Lore To Make Your Campaigns Awesome" list — the article states that "DMs planning on introducing Curse of Strahd or modifying it into their campaign may reveal Count Strahd as a villainous NPC. He may even be incorporated as a Warlock Patron, with the Warlock's story arc eclipsing in their arrival in Barovia. An alluring and attractive villain, Count Strahd can easily become a favorite villain with his cunning, unpredictable, and chilling nature."

Henry Glasheen, for SLUG Magazine, highlighted that "up until the release of Ravenloft, almost every adventure module was just a shoestring of dungeon traps and monster encounters meant to test the valor and endurance of the player characters", however, the Hickmans created Count Strahd von Zarovich because they "were sick of the seemingly random nature of these campaigns, and longed for a rich, complex villain—the kind that you could find in a book but rarely, if ever, in a campaign". Similarly, Francesco Cacciatore of Polygon called Strahd "both familiar and unpredictable", noting that the character was created "to be the opposite of the classic D&D monster who sits in a dungeon room, waiting for the party to show up. He has goals, agency, and a checkered past for players to discover". Ari David, for CBR, wrote that the character "eternally remains one of the most feared" of "all of the great evils in the many worlds comprising the D&D multiverse" and is "a somewhat unique figure amongst a rogue's gallery of evil dragon gods, devil princes, and zombie wizards".

Glasheen commented that "to this day, he's one of the best-written and most interesting villains of Dungeons & Dragons" – Strahd "toys with" and tempts the players "with the possibility of immortality and dark power" while also suffering from "the sting of his own twisted ambitions, a fatal hubris that drives him and sustains him". Glasheen opined that Strahd is "a complex and entirely likeable villain, and that's what makes him so dangerous". Similarly, David argued that "Strahd is more than a shallow Dracula knock-off" as beyond the "sinister cat-and-mouse games lies the broken heart of a once-great warrior. His fall into villainy was fueled by pride, jealousy, and love. Despite this, he is a prisoner bound to his domain, doomed to repeat a cycle of violence". David felt that this "humanizing backstory" is part of why Strahd's "popularity with D&D fans remains strong ". Cacciatore similarly called Strahd's story "relatable" since it is "built around power, greed, and jealousy, which are all deeply human themes", however, he argued that Strahd's history does not create "a window for players to empathize with him" as he turns to dark powers due to jealousy and "remains a monster until the end". Cacciatore opined that "Strahd himself stands out as a villain you can feel justified – and satisfied – in hating. It reminds players of simpler times when good was good and evil had visible fangs and drank young women's blood".

=== Portrayal in novels and modules ===
Rob Bricken of Io9 highlighted the portrayal of Strahd in Vampire of the Mists (1991) as both "genuinely compelling" and "immensely evil on occasion". The novel centers on the "uneasy camaraderie" between Jander and Strahd, with Jander having little choice but to remain in Barovia. Bricken noted that Strahd enjoys Jander's company while simultaneously tormenting him with "horrific acts of cruelty", aware of how much Jander "hates it". Bricken commented that Strahd shows emotional range where he is "quick to anger, but quick to calm down again"; however, Bricken concluded that while Strahd is "technically a complex character", his complexities "aren't complex". Bricken also viewed Strahd as "a Dracula", noting he has a "driverless carriage and castle doors that open on his own. His castle is completely decrepit other than his library and study, because he's classy like that".

Cacciatore wrote that the character's "enduring popularity is in part tied to Ravenloft and Curse of Strahd being exceptional adventures that defined eras of D&D". Rory Bristol, in a review Curse of Strahd (2016) for GeekDad, highlighted Strahd as a classic horror genre villain – the "centuries-old vampire" has powers such as regeneration, shapeshifting into mist or bat, and "a trio of legendary abilities" which make him "the nightmare you've been looking for. His obsession for power, victory, and domination have made him a cruel master with a Lawful Evil disposition". Bristol noted that Strahd has a tragic obsession of finding the reincarnation of "his one true love". He also highlighted that Strahd does not fear the player adventuring party as he orchestrated their "journey to his realm, for his own sinister purposes".

In his Bleeding Cool review of Dungeons and Dragons: Shadows of the Vampire (November 2016), Gavin Sheehan praised the story as a standout due to its focus on "one of the longest-running villains in the game, Strahd von Zarovich from the Ravenloft adventures". Sheehan highlighted that "Strahd is the vampire of all vampires in this world", noting that the character brings "the usual array of horror, darkness, bloodshed, and standing guard in the middle of the night so you don't join his army of darkness". He commented that this adventure is for the fans of "horror or just the ever-present danger that comes with certain kinds of storytelling".

== List of related products ==
=== Novels and comics ===
==== With Strahd as the main character ====
- I Strahd, Memoirs of a Vampire (1993) by P. N. Elrod, (ISBN 0-517-16592-9)

REPRINTED (Nov. 2006) (ISBN 1-56076-931-9 ISBN 978-1-56076-931-6)
Details how both Strahd became a vampire and how Ravenloft originally formed.

- I, Strahd: The War Against Azalin (June 1998), by P. N. Elrod, (ISBN 0-7869-0754-1)

Presented as the diary of Strahd von Zarovich written during the period of war between Barovia and Darkon.

- Caretaker A Strahd short story by P. N. Elrod in Tales of Ravenloft (Sept. 1994) edited by Brian Thomsen (ISBN 1-56076-931-9 ISBN 978-1-56076-931-6)

Details how Strahd handles things when bandits invade his realm.

- Worlds of Dungeons & Dragons #6 (2008), written by R.A. Salvatore and P. N. Elrod, and illustrated by Juanfran Moyano and Ricardo Sanchez

Caretaker script adapted by P.N. Elrod was released as the second story in this comic issue published by Devil's Due Publishing

==== Including Strahd ====
- Vampire of the Mists (September 1991), by Christie Golden, (ISBN 1-56076-155-5)

Ravenloft's first full novel provided a clear link between the Forgotten Realms and Ravenloft.

- Knight of the Black Rose (December 1991), by James Lowder, (ISBN 1-56076-156-3)

Featuring Lord Soth of the Dragonlance setting in the Demiplane of Dread.

- Dungeons and Dragons: Shadows of the Vampire (November 2016), written by Jim Zub, and illustrated by Max Dunbar and Nelson Daniel (ISBN 1-63140-766-X)

Features Strahd as the main villain.

- Dungeons & Dragons: Days of Endless Adventure (March 2020), written by Jim Zub, and illustrated by Max Dunbar, Sarah Stone, Nelson Daniel, and Netho Diaz (ISBN 978-1-68405-275-2)

Collected edition includes the following mini-series: The Legends of Baldur's Gate, Shadows of the Vampire, and Frost Giant's Fury.

- Ravenloft: Heir of Strahd (May 2025), by Delilah S. Dawson, (ISBN 9780593599778)

Features Strahd as the main villain.

=== Roleplaying game modules and sourcebooks ===
- Hickman, Tracy; Hickman, Laura (1983). Ravenloft. TSR. ISBN 0-88038-042-X.
- Hickman, Tracy; Hickman, Laura; Cook, David "Zeb"; Grubb, Jeff; Johnson, Harold; Niles, Douglas (1986). Ravenloft II: The House on Gryphon Hill. TSR. ISBN 0-88038-322-4.
- Nesmith, Bruce; Hayday, Andria (1990). Ravenloft: Realm of Terror. TSR. ISBN 0-8803-8853-6.
- Connors, William; Nesmith, Bruce (1992). Forbidden Lore. TSR. ISBN 1-56076-354-X.
- Nesmith, Bruce (1992). From the Shadows. TSR. ISBN 1-56076-356-6.
- Haddock, Eric; David Wise (1993). Roots of Evil. TSR. ISBN 1-56076-597-6.
- Nesmith, Bruce; Hayday, Andria; Connors, William (1994). Ravenloft Campaign Setting. TSR. ISBN 1-56076-942-4.
- Connors, William; Miller, Steve (1997). Domains of Dread. TSR/Wizards of the Coast. ISBN 0-7869-0672-3.
- Cermak, Andrew; John Mangrum; Andrew Wyatt (2001). Ravenloft Campaign Setting (3rd ed.). Arthaus. ISBN 1-58846-075-4.
- Cermak, Andrew; John Mangrum; Andrew Wyatt (2001). Secrets of the Dread Realms. Arthaus. ISBN 1-58846-076-2.
- Cermak, Andrew; John Mangrum; Chris Nichols; Andrew Wyatt (2002). Ravenloft Gazetteer Volume I. Arthaus. ISBN 1-58846-080-0.
- Mangrum, John; Campbell, Brian; Hollar, Carla; Lilavivat, Rucht; Pryor, Anthony; Woodworth, Peter; Wyatt, Andrew (2003). Ravenloft Dungeon Master's Guide. Arthaus. ISBN 1-58846-084-3.
- Cordell, Bruce; Eytan Bernstein; James, Brian; Laws, Robin; Snead, John (2009). Open Grave: Secrets of the Undead. Wizards of the Coast. p. 224. ISBN 978-0-7869-5069-0.
- Jeremy Crawford, Laura Hickman, Tracy Hickman, Adam Lee, Christopher Perkins, Richard Whitters (2016). Curse of Strahd. Wizards of the Coast. ISBN 978-0786965984
