= Castles Forlorn =

- Genre: Role-playing games
- Publisher: TSR
- Publication date: 1993
- Media type: Boxed set

Castles Forlorn is an accessory for the Ravenloft campaign setting for the 2nd edition of the Advanced Dungeons & Dragons fantasy role-playing game, published in 1993.

== Contents ==
In Castles Forlorn, the player characters explore the eight-level Tristenoria mansion, which exists simultaneously in three time periods, though all three incarnations occupy the same physical space. Castle A, the first incarnation, exists (in 1939 on the Forfar calendar) when the mortar is still fresh, the candelabras still gleam, and the view out the window shows green hills and bright skies. A century later, Castle B exists in a time where supernatural disasters have cracked the plaster, shattered the glass, and blackened the skies. In 2122, Castle C lies in ruin; cobwebs choke the corridors, the walls have collapsed, and the view from the windows reveals a ravaged landscape and scavenging monsters.

While exploring the castle, the PCs activate temporal shifts that spin the castle into the three different eras. By assigning colors to the various incarnations (red for Castle A, blue for Castle B, green for Castle C), the poster map shows which rooms and doors exist in each period. The text offers suggestions for handling paradoxes (such as when different PCs occupy the same room in different time periods) and measuring time. (Time may pass independently in each incarnation.)

The rest of the package focuses on the domain of Forlorn and its minions. Tristen ApBlanc, the lord of Forlorn, is part vampire and part ghost. A section on druidism reveals the spell-casting secrets of redheaded humans. Landmarks include a granite cliff that weeps blood and a half-mile fissure that spews yellow vapor to enshroud the domain.

== Publication history ==
Castles Forlorn was published by TSR, Inc. as a boxed set containing one 96-page book, two 32-page books, one double-sided 32" x 21" map sheet, one single-sided 32" x 21" map sheet, and one 32" x 21" poster. Design was by Lisa Smedman and editing by David Wise, with a cover by Dana M. Knutson and illustrations by Stephen Fabian, Arnie Swekel, and Robert Klasnich.

== Reception ==
Rick Swan reviewed Castles Forlorn for Dragon magazine #205 (May 1994). According to Swan, the set features a "terrific castle", citing its twist of existing simultaneously in three time periods. He describes the results as "startling, to say the least. A door appears, then disappears. A dark passage fills with light, then goes dark again. A plush bedroom with expensive furniture becomes a musty chamber piled with debris, with bloody hand prints smeared on the walls." He noted that while the text offers sensible suggestions for handling paradoxes and measuring time, "the text includes everything but a developed adventure; instead, we're given an assortment of hazards and encouraged to "build tension gradually by saving the nastiest surprises for last." That's easier said than done, especially for novice referees who require a lot more structure than this to get a campaign off the ground." He felt that the Forlorn material "mixes the clever with the ordinary", noting that while Tristen ApBlanc "could teach Count Strahd a thing or two about ghastliness", a lot of the other material "seems like filler", in that some of the locations such as the Sacred Groves and the Caverns of the Dead "aren't much more interesting than their names", some of the ghostly NPCs "work better as obstacles than personalities", and Aggie, "a clone of the Loch Ness Monster, doesn't have much to do other than pose for the cover". Swan concluded the review by saying: "In the hands of a creative referee, Castles Forlorn can be a source of endless surprise. If, for instance, the party steals a book from a room in Castle C, then later tosses a fireball into the Castle A incarnation of the same room, the stolen book may turn to ash in their hands. Think of the Forlorn material as a bonus; get this for the castle."

Gene Alloway reviewed the module in a 1994 issue of White Wolf. He rated the game at 3 of 5 for Complexity, Concepts, Playability, and Value, and a 4 for Appearance. He stated that "quality is quite high" and gave it an overall rating of 3.
