= Ravenloft (Sword and Sorcery Studios) =

Ravenloft is a 2001 role-playing game supplement published by Sword and Sorcery Studios.

== Contents ==
Ravenloft is a supplement in which the Ravenloft campaign setting is detailed.

== Publication history ==
Shannon Appelcline noted that "White Wolf's ArtHaus division opted to produce some d20 lines that the main company might not have been able to. ArtHaus thus licensed two of Wizards of the Coast's old settings - Gamma World in 2001 and Ravenloft in 2002 - and produced a series of supplements for each." Appelcline explained however that "By 2004, the d20 market was in full crash mode. However, White Wolf and Sword & Sorcery had sufficient name recognition that they weren't as deeply impacted as some other publishers. They closed down some lines - like Scarred Lands and their 'core rulebooks' - and slowed down Necromancer Games' production but EverQuest, WarCraft, the Malhavoc books, Gamma World and Raveloft were strong enough to support continued production." Appelcline noted that "In 2005, White Wolf signed rights to Gamma World and Ravenloft back to Wizards of the Coast - who would get around to using them some five years later." Appelcine commented that "when ArtHaus reverted to the Gamma World and Ravenloft rights in 2005, they found themselves without any products to print".

== Reviews ==
- Pyramid
- Backstab
- Magus (Issue 50 - Dec 2001)
- Realms of Fantasy
