= Roots of Evil (Ravenloft) =

Dungeons & Dragons module

- Code: RM1
- First published: 1993

Roots of Evil is an adventure for the 2nd edition of the Advanced Dungeons & Dragons fantasy role-playing game, published in 1993.

== Publication history ==
The module was written by Eric Haddock and David Wise and published by TSR.

== Contents ==
The module follows From the Shadows in the Ravenloft series.

== Reception ==
Gene Alloway reviewed Roots of Evil in a 1993 issue of White Wolf. He stated that Roots of Evil "is another excellent addition to the Ravenloft sage". He concluded that:

Major evil characters are dealt with, and the well-being of the Prime Material plane is at stake. All elements of this work are professionally done and a joy to play. There are plenty of ideas in here for any AD&D game or for any fantasy role playing game, for that matter. If you don't have this adventure, or the earlier From the Shadows, get them. They will show you how a good adventure is done.

Overall, Alloway rated the module a 4 out of a possible 5.
