= Van Richten's Guide to Werebeasts =

1993 role-playing game accessory

- Genre: Role-playing games
- Publisher: TSR
- Publication date: 1993

Van Richten's Guide to Werebeasts is an accessory for the 2nd edition of the Advanced Dungeons & Dragons fantasy role-playing game, published in 1993.

== Reception ==
Gene Alloway reviewed Van Richten's Guide to Werebeasts in White Wolf #45 (July, 1994), rating it a 4 out of 5 and stated that "Overall [...] this is a worthy addition to the tomes of the venerable Van Richten. I hope the old hunter will write more."
