= Bruce Nesmith =

American game designer

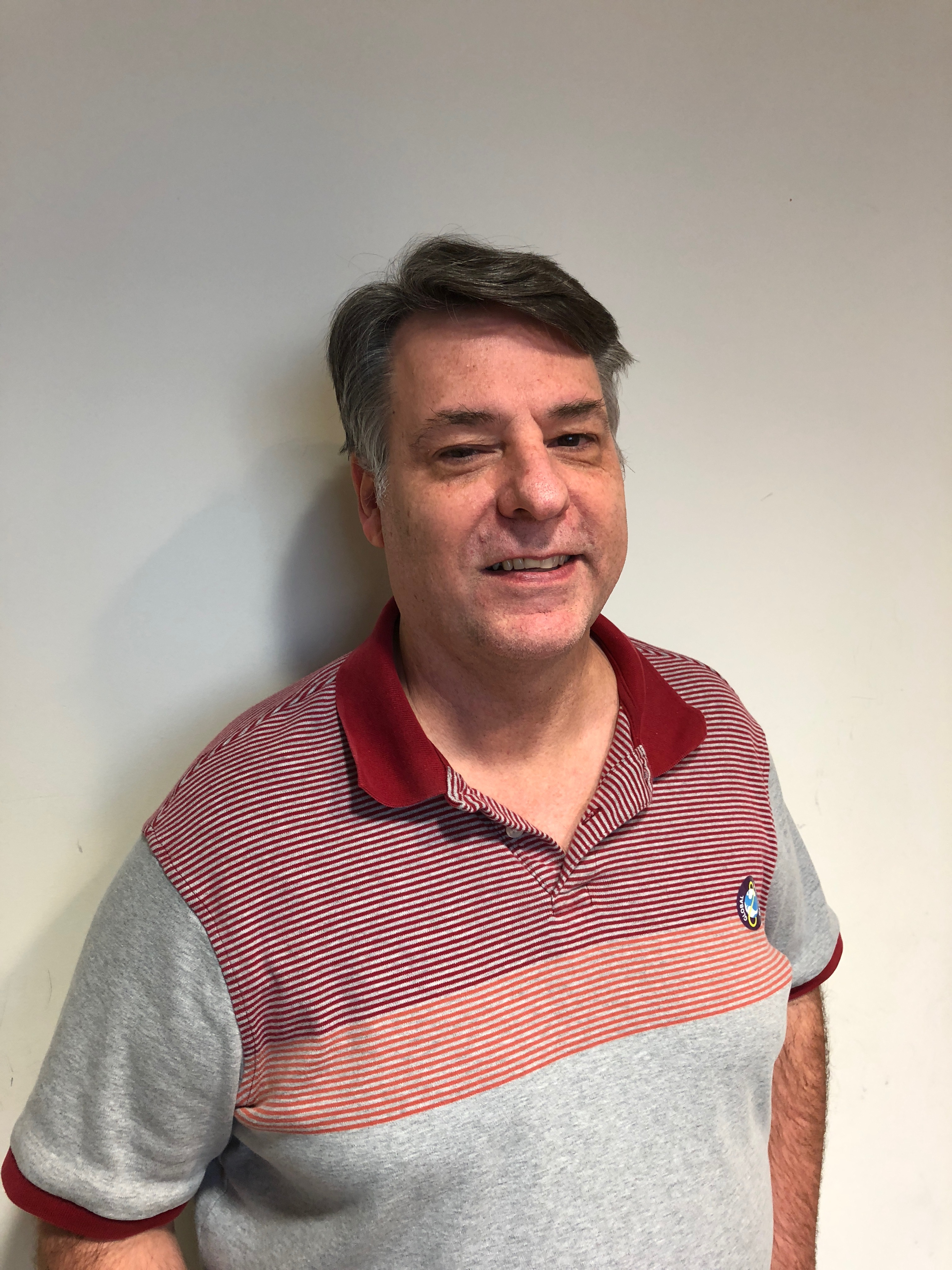
- Nesmith in 2018
- Born: United States
- Occupations: Game designer, Novelist
- Known for: Dungeons & Dragons, Elder Scrolls V: Skyrim

Bruce Nesmith is a game designer who has worked primarily on role-playing games. He was Creative Director at TSR, working on a variety of games including Dungeons & Dragons, and was a senior game designer and design director at Bethesda Game Studios, where he worked on AAA titles such as Fallout 3, Fallout 4 and Elder Scrolls IV: Oblivion, and was lead designer on Elder Scrolls V: Skyrim.

== Career ==
TSR, Inc. hired Nesmith in 1981 to design computer games on the Apple II+, and he soon moved on to be a writer of Dungeons & Dragons modules. After the original Dragonlance group began, the Dragonlance Series Design Team was later expanded to include Nesmith as well as Margaret Weis, Douglas Niles, Mike Breault, Roger Moore, Laura Hickman, Linda Bakk, Michael Dobson and Garry Spiegle. Nesmith designed Ravenloft: Realm of Terror (1990), which built on the ideas explored in the original Ravenloft adventure written by the Hickmans in an attempt to make Advanced Dungeons & Dragons competitive with horror role-playing games such as Call of Cthulhu and Chill. Nesmith and Andria Hayday designed the DragonStrike board game, which was published by TSR, Inc.

His other design work for D&D includes The War Rafts of Kron (1984), Sabre River (1984), Master Player Screen Featuring The Spindle (1985), The Book of Lairs II (1987), Tales of the Outer Planes (1988), Monstrous Compendium, Volume 2 (1989), Monstrous Compendium, Volume 1 (1989), Hall of Heroes (1989), Monstrous Compendium Spelljammer Appendix (1990), Monstrous Compendium Greyhawk Appendix (1990), Monstrous Compendium Dragonlance Appendix (1990), Greyhawk Ruins (1990), Touch of Death (1991), Monstrous Compendium Forgotten Realms Appendix II (1991), Goblins' Return (1991), Darklords (1991), Unsung Heroes (1992), From the Shadows (1992), Forbidden Lore (1992), Van Richten's Guide to Werebeasts (1993), House of Strahd (1993), The Created (1993), Ravenloft Campaign Setting, 2nd Ed. (1994), Hour of the Knife (1994), First Quest (1994), Dark Sun Monstrous Compendium Appendix II: Terrors Beyond Tyr (1995), Psionic Artifacts of Athas (1996), and Domains of Dread (1997).

Nesmith was one of the guests of honor at "Winter Fantasy 18" in 1994.

In July 1995, Nesmith joined Bethesda Softworks as Senior Producer. He contributed to The Elder Scrolls II: Daggerfall computer roleplaying game, and Terminator computer games, and then became a senior game designer for Bethesda Game Studios, where he worked extensively on The Elder Scrolls IV: Oblivion and its expansion, The Shivering Isles. He was also the lead designer on Elder Scrolls V: Skyrim. The video game Fallout 3, for which Nesmith did some of the quest writing, was nominated for an award for videogame writing at the Writers Guild of America Awards 2008.
