= Ravenloft =

Dungeons & Dragons fictional campaign setting

- Designers: Tracy Hickman, Laura Hickman, Bruce Nesmith, Andria Hayday, William W. Connors, Andrew Cermak, John Mangrum, Andrew Wyatt, et al.
- Publishers: TSR, Inc; Wizards of the Coast; Swords & Sorcery Studios and Arthaus (White Wolf Publishing imprints)
- Publication: 1983–2021
- Genres: Gothic horror
- Systems: Advanced Dungeons & Dragons 1st and 2nd Editions; Dungeons & Dragons 3rd Ed. d20 System; D&D v3.5; D&D 5th Edition

Ravenloft is a campaign setting for the Dungeons & Dragons roleplaying game. It is an alternate time-space existence known as a pocket dimension or demiplane, called the Demiplane of Dread, which consists of a collection of land pieces called "domains", brought together by a mysterious force known only as the Dark Powers. Each domain is tailored to and mystically ruled by a being called a Darklord who is forever trapped and surrounded by magical mists surrounding the domain. Strahd von Zarovich, a vampire in the original AD&D Ravenloft I6 module released in 1983, became the first Darklord, both ruler and prisoner of his own personal domain of Barovia. The story of how Count von Zarovich became Darklord of Barovia was detailed in the 1993 novel I, Strahd: The Memoirs of a Vampire. As originally established in the Ravenloft: Realm of Terror boxed set known as "the Black Box" released in 1990, the Ravenloft campaign setting was located in the Ethereal Plane. As a physical manifestation of that plane, lands, monsters and even people were created out of the mysterious mists, and the realm acted as a prison where one could enter or be transported, but means of escape were few. Other Ravenloft Domains and Darklords were eventually added in various AD&D 2nd edition (and then later in 3rd edition) products establishing a core continent attached around Barovia which could be traveled to by others if their respective lords allowed entering or leaving their borders; while some Domains remained isolated in the mists and were referred to as Islands.

== Creative origins ==
In 1978, Tracy and Laura Hickman wrote adventures that would eventually be published as the Dungeon & Dragons modules Pharaoh and Ravenloft. Strahd von Zarovich was created by the Hickmans "after Tracy returned home from a disappointing session of D&D. Back in First Edition, the game was less of a storytelling game. [...] It didn't make sense to [Tracy] why a creature like a vampire was just sitting around in a random dungeon with oozes, goblins, and zombies. So he and his wife set out to create a vampire villain with fleshed-out motivations and history". When the Hickmans began work on Ravenloft, they felt the vampire archetype had become overused, trite, and mundane, and decided to create a frightening version of the creature for the module. They play-tested it with a group of players every Halloween for five years on their own game system with the adventure titled Vampyr. However, the Hickmans kept being asked about their "Ravenloft game", and so the Ravenloft name stuck. The duo eventually caught the attention of D&D's original publishers. They were hired to adapt it into the first edition of Advanced Dungeons & Dragons and it was released as Module I6: Ravenloft in 1983 by TSR.

== Publication history ==
=== 1st edition ===
The first appearance of the setting was in Ravenloft, a stand-alone Advanced Dungeons & Dragons adventure module, published in 1983. In 1984, it won the Strategists' Club Award for Outstanding Play Aid. It was popular enough to spawn a 1986 sequel, Ravenloft II: The House on Gryphon Hill, and an Advanced Dungeons & Dragons Adventure Gamebooks novel, Master of Ravenloft, the same year.

=== 2nd edition ===
Ravenloft was launched as a full-fledged campaign setting, for AD&D 2nd Edition, in 1990, with the Realm of Terror boxed set, popularly known as the "Black Box", and winner of the Origins Award in 1991 for "Best Graphic Presentation of a Roleplaying Game, Adventure, or Supplement of 1990".

The campaign setting was revised twice during AD&D 2nd Edition: first as the Ravenloft Campaign Setting or "Red Box", then as the Domains of Dread hardback.

In 1994, Ravenloft spun off into a sub-setting called Masque of the Red Death, set on Gothic Earth, an Edgar Allan Poe-influenced alternative Earth of the 1890s, where fantasy creatures and magic exist in the shadows of civilization.

TSR also published a series of novels set in Ravenloft. Each was typically focused on one of the Darklords that inhabited the Ravenloft world, with several focusing on the figure of Count Strahd von Zarovich. Many of these early novels were by authors who would later receive wider fame as horror/dark fantasy authors. These authors have included Elaine Bergstrom, P. N. Elrod, Christie Golden, and Laurell K. Hamilton.

=== 3rd and 3.5 edition ===
A major revision of Dungeons & Dragons was released in 2000, the first edition published by Wizards of the Coast (which had acquired TSR in 1997). In the same year, Wizards of the Coast licensed the Ravenloft brand to White Wolf Publishing. Under its Sword & Sorcery Studios (and later Arthaus imprints), White Wolf Publishing released the 3rd Edition d20 System Ravenloft Campaign Setting (2001) and the 3.5 Edition Ravenloft Player's Handbook (2003).

The campaign settings published by White Wolf introduced a number of alterations, many due to conflicts with existing Wizards of the Coast intellectual property. Specific references to D&D-specific deities were replaced with new names in the White Wolf Ravenloft settings (for example, Bane was changed to the Lawgiver). The license to the Ravenloft trademark reverted to Wizards of the Coast on August 15, 2005, but White Wolf retained the right to continue to sell its back stock until June 2006. The timing of this reversion meant that the Ravenloft supplement Van Richten's Guide to the Mists did not see print. Instead, it was released by White Wolf as a free download in late September 2005. The majority of the Van Richten's Guide series had already been published by TSR in the 1990s, before White Wolf's involvement.

In October 2006, Wizards of the Coast released Expedition to Castle Ravenloft, a hardcover version of the original 1st Ed. adventure, updated for the Dungeons & Dragons v.3.5 rule set. This version includes maps from the original Ravenloft adventure, and new character-generation options. Expedition to Castle Ravenloft is a stand-alone supplement set for any D&D worlds, and only requires the three core books for usage. This book's setting is distinct from the Ravenloft of the White Wolf product line. Shannon Appelcline, author of Designers & Dragons, highlighted that by 2006 people were beginning to wonder if Wizards of the Coast might be preparing a fourth edition of Dungeons & Dragons and stated that "the release of Expedition to Castle Ravenloft (2006) might just have offered another clue to the changing winds that lay ahead. First, it was a new line for 3.5e, suggesting that their original series of 3.5e books was coming to an end. Second, it was a fond look back at one of the most notable adventures from the AD&D days, just the sort of thing that Wizards published in the waning days of 2e". Appelcline later noted that, once fourth edition was officially announced, "the Expedition books that had begun publication in 2006 were revealed to indeed be part of Wizard's slow slide into 4e".

=== 4th edition ===
In 2007, Wizards of the Coast announced the printing of two new Ravenloft novels for 2008, Black Crusade and The Sleep of Reason, fueling more speculation. A short story by Ari Marmell, "Before I Wake", based on the realms of Darkon, Lamordia, and Bluetspur was released on October 31, 2007, on the Wizards of the Coast website as a special for Halloween; it featured characters inspired by H. P. Lovecraft and Clark Ashton Smith.

In 2008, Ravenloft was revealed to be re-introduced to 4th edition of Dungeons & Dragons, as was depicted in the October issue of the Dragon online magazine. The Dungeons & Dragons 4th edition supplement Manual of the Planes (2008) established that in the retconned cosmology, the Domains of Dread (and by extension the Ravenloft setting) were now located within the Shadowfell, a mirror-plane of death and gloom lying adjacent to the mortal realm. While a 4th edition update to the Ravenloft setting was announced at Gen Con 2010, the product was never released.

In 2010, Ravenloft was the setting for the Castle Ravenloft Board Game. Ravenloft also appeared in official magazine articles, such as, Dungeon #207 "Fair Barovia" (October 2012) and Dragon #416 "History Check: Strahd and Van Richten" (October 2012).

=== 5th and 5.5 edition ===
In 2016, Barovia (one of the main locations within Ravenloft) was the main setting for adventure module Curse of Strahd which acts as an adaptation of the original Ravenloft module for the 5th edition of Dungeons & Dragons. The adventure states: "The lands of Barovia are from a forgotten world in the D&D multiverse [...]. In time, cursed Barovia was torn from its home world by the Dark Powers and bound in mist as one of the Domains of Dread in the Shadowfell". The module was developed in-house by the Wizards of the Coast team, led by Christopher Perkins, with story contributions by original creators Tracy and Laura Hickman. Charlie Hall, for Polygon, explained that "instead of reinventing the wheel, principle [sic] designer Chris Perkins brought in the module's original writers — the husband and wife team of Tracy and Laura Hickman — to create the very best version of the famous module yet. [...] Tracy and Laura have been hosting nearly annual sessions of the original Ravenloft at their home, for friends and family, over the course of decades. When Perkins asked for their input, they flew out to meet with the team. The result was a torrent of ideas for new locations, characters and encounters". Ravenloft was also the setting of the limited series comic Dungeons and Dragons: Shadows of the Vampire (2016) written by Jim Zub, and illustrated by Max Dunbar and Nelson Daniel.

Wizards of the Coast released a new edition of the Curse of Strahd module, entitled Curse of Strahd: Revamped, on October 20, 2020. This module is the first released with the publisher's new focus on diversity and inclusion. Wizards of the Coast stated that "the adventure includes the latest errata and a revised depiction of the Vistani" who are based on stereotypes about the Romani people.

Wizards of the Coast released a new Ravenloft campaign sourcebook, Van Richten's Guide to Ravenloft (2021), which introduces other Domains of Dread to the edition. It was published on May 18, 2021. The limited series comic Ravenloft: Orphan of Agony Isle (2022), by writer Casey Gilley and artist Bayleigh Underwood, then featured the mad scientist Viktra Mordenheim, the Darklord of Ravenloft's Lamordia domain introduced in Van Richten's Guide to Ravenloft. The novel Ravenloft: Heir of Strahd (2025), by Delilah S. Dawson, was the first Ravenloft novel to be published in 17 years.

In March 2026, Wizards of the Coast announced a new seasonal content format for Dungeons & Dragons with the "Season of Horror" which was scheduled to run from April 2026 to June 2026. This season featured a return to Ravenloft. It included the release of the 5.5 Edition sourcebook Ravenloft: The Horrors Within (2026) along with associated accessory products. The Horrors Within details sixteen Domains of Dread, including the new cosmic horror domain Innsmouth; a bestiary with Ravenloft monstrosities, denizens and Darklords; and, various player options such as subclasses, species, and Dark Gifts. The board game Horrified: Dungeons & Dragons – Ravenloft released in July 2026. The limited series Dungeons & Dragons: Ravenloft, by writer Amy Chu and artist Ariela Kristantina, focuses on monster hunter Ez D'Avenir who is hunted by Viktra; the first issue was published on August 19, 2026. In October 2026, Project_Lamordia was released as a digital exclusive on D&D Beyond. This modern techno-horror supplement features a reimagined Lamordia. It includes three adventures as well as reflavored player options from The Horrors Within.

== Fictional setting ==
Ravenloft is primarily a Gothic horror setting. Dungeon Masters are encouraged to use scenes that build apprehension and fear, culminating in the eventual face-to-face meeting with the nameless evil. Characters have a much greater significance attached to their acts, especially if they are morally impure, as they risk coming under the influence of the Dark Powers (through the game process called "dark powers checks") and gradually transforming themselves into figures of evil.

The magical mists of Ravenloft could appear anywhere in the Dungeons & Dragons universe, drawing evil-doers (or player characters) into the Ravenloft setting. One exception is the phlogiston of the Spelljammer setting. The phlogiston blocks all planar travel, but the Ravenloft mists can appear in deep space inside crystal shells, according to the Complete Spacefarer's Handbook.

Luis Javier Flores Arvizu named the continuous presence of supernatural beings as one of the factors that made Ravenloft a very well received role-playing game setting during the 33 years of its existence.

=== The Dark Powers ===
The Dark Powers are a malevolent force who control the Demiplane of Dread. Their exact nature and number are deliberately kept vague, allowing for plot development in accordance with the Gothic tradition of storytelling – where the heroes are frequently outclassed and outnumbered by unknowable evil forces beyond their control. Academic Martine Gjermundsen Ræstad commented that the Darklords of Ravenloft have "intention and free will" which results in them also having "a level of accountability" when their actions are judged by the Dark Powers; however, the punishment cycle which pushes Darklords "to further evil" raises questions about the motivations of the Dark Powers, and whether their purpose is to deliver "just punishment to evil souls" or whether they are "a force propagating and nourishing evil".

The Dark Powers most frequently serve as a plot device for Ravenloft, especially concerning the Darklords, the de facto visible rulers of the Ravenloft Demiplane. Where the player characters are often tormented and opposed by the Darklords, the Darklords are themselves tormented and opposed by the Dark Powers. The difference lies in order of power—while many D&D adventures focus on allowing a band of heroes to prevail over a Darklord (much as in the spirit of Bram Stoker's novel Dracula), no such victory over the Dark Powers seems possible, or even conceivable, for the Darklords.

Vecna and Lord Soth "escaped" Ravenloft, but are the only two Darklords known to have done so; Vecna by attaining the status of Greater God (and thus becoming too powerful for the Dark Powers to contain) and Lord Soth by ignoring his domain and punishment, causing the Dark Powers to lose interest in imprisoning him, and agents of his former curse on the world of Krynn coming to collect him. Most frequently, the Dark Powers make their wishes and intentions known through subtle manipulations of fate. Thus, Barovia's vampire lord Strahd von Zarovich's many attempts to win back his love, Tatyana, are doomed to failure, but the Dark Powers arrange such that he never truly loses hope. Each time, for example, Strahd's own actions may be partially culpable for his failure, and as such he may go through crippling self-recrimination, rather than cursing the gods solely and giving up. Most other Darklords have similar tales of frustration, kept all the more unbearable because the flicker of the possibility of success is never truly extinguished. Not all Darklords acknowledge the Dark Powers directly, however. Strahd, for example, in his own memoirs, speaks only of a force known as Death, who mocks him with the voices of his family and former colleagues throughout his life. Vlad Drakov, the Darklord of Falkovnia whose military expeditions are doomed to constant failure, seems even to be totally oblivious to any non-mortal factors in his repeated defeats.

The Dark Powers also seem capable of non-evil manipulations. Although their machinations are often directly responsible for the misery of many of Ravenloft's inhabitants, they also appear to play a role as dispensers of justice. Some tales of innocents who have escaped Ravenloft for happier environs are attributed to the Dark Powers, who have judged a being worthy of reward and release from their misty domain.

=== Domains of Dread ===
There are many Domains of Dread that makeup the landscape of Ravenloft. The Domains are surrounded by strange mists that can ensnare both people and places in Prime Material Plane and pull them into the Domains. Each Domain is ruled by a Darklord, but each Darklord was imprisoned in their Domain by the Dark Powers. The Dark Powers "are believed to have been responsible for the overall creation of the Dread Domains". Ræstad explained that these Domains are facsimiles of locations from the Material Plane, mostly homelands brought with their respective Darklords, where "each Domain's environment becomes a reflection of its Darklord's psyche and sins, specially crafted to grant them a tantalizing amount of power and yet typically deny them what they desire the most. The entirety of each Domain runs on 'nightmare logic' and reflects its Darklord's inner life and worst transgression".

The concept of Domains and locations in Ravenloft, besides Barovia and Mordent, was introduced in the 2nd Edition campaign setting book Ravenloft: Realm of Terror (1990). This book outlined that the size of Ravenloft is "40,000 square miles [spanning] 26 different domains, including Barovia and Mordent. All of the core domains are overviewed in Ravenloft, as are eight 'islands'". The revised 2nd Edition boxset Ravenloft Campaign Setting (1994) is an update to Realm of Terror, but it removes Domains that were destroyed in the Grand Conjunction adventure series and adds new Domains. The metaplot of the adventure series was used to update the setting: "David Wise, leader of the 'Kargat' of Ravenloft designers at TSR, has said there were a few reasons for the changes. Some domains were changed or removed because they didn't fit into Ravenloft ecologically [...]. Some domains were removed or merged because their lords were too similar, and finally some islands of terror were kicked to the curb just because they were 'less exciting'. [...] A few domains that had appeared since the publication of Ravenloft: Realm of Terror were notably missing [...]. All told, Ravenloft Campaign Setting covers 20 core domains and nine islands". The 5th Edition campaign guide Van Richten's Guide to Ravenloft (2021) includes an overview of 39 Domains and many Domains are given a "wholesale revision" while "other Domains keep their original lore but are advanced in other ways". Rob Wieland, writing for Forbes, explained that in this book "many of the domains have new Darklords that reflect their original character but have details changed to better fit the type of horror the domain is supposed to represent".

Some of the more notable Domains include:

- Barovia: the first Domain introduced and "foreboding" home of Strahd von Zarovich. This domain was "inspired by Bram Stoker's Dracula".
- Carnival: this domain "wanders the mists" itself, "populated by wild performers and a powerful, living sword".
- Darkon: this domain is "a broken land [...] whose central castle is frozen mid-explosion, its disparate rooms desperately trying to reassemble the whole in mid-air", and "Darkon is now a Domain in decline after the disappearance of the iconic lich Azalin".
- Falkovnia: in its original incarnation, this domain's "Darklord was a fairly basic analog for Vlad the Impaler [...] and it had few defining characteristics beyond being a land ruled by a brutal warlord with a penchant for ultraviolence". In Van Richten's Guide to Ravenloft, "Falkovnia has been reimagined as a nightmarish Groundhog's Day-style loop, where a struggling nation—which happens to be ruled by a brutal warlord—is endlessly besieged by massive hordes of the walking dead, who just so happen to look like everyone this warlord has ever killed". The Darklord Vladeska "Drakov's ruthless efficiency and relentless perfectionism has turned her into a tyrant. Rather than retreat and save the lives of citizens and soldiers alike, every day she rebuilds the barricades that keep death at bay. Those same walls keep her trapped within".
- Hazlan: this domain is a magocracy ruled by the Red Wizard Hazlik who treats the domain as a "vast magical laboratory". Wes Schneider, lead designer of Van Richten's Guide to Ravenloft, highlighted that "Hazlan's a great example of a Ravenloft domain where the 'technology' behind its horror concept has improved since its origin. [...] Since the '90s, our collective imaginations have expanded on what an evil magic dystopia might look like. [...] Hazlan is a domain where anything wizards could do they've done to the extreme, and they're still doing it, all in the name of magical discovery and with the effects scarring the realm's people and land. This makes it the domain for all manner of weird monsters, amoral experiments, magical contagions, unnatural weather, collapsing reality, meteor showers, mutations, disasters, and so much more".
- Lamordia: this domain "paid homage" to Frankenstein by Mary Shelley. In its original incarnation, Lamordia was a coastal domain with two small settlements and was ruled by Adam, a flesh golem-like creature created by Doctor Victor Mordenheim. In Van Richten's Guide to Ravenloft (2021), the region is now ruled by Viktra Mordenheim, a mad scientist tormented by her inability to replicate the Unbreakable Heart device that keeps her reborn lover Elise alive, even as Elise flees from her at every turn. In the modern techno-horror supplement Project_Lamordia (2026), the domain is reimagined as the campus of Mordenheim Kinetics lost in mists of Ravenloft. Viktra Mordenheim is the CEO and Darklord.

=== Darklords ===
Darklord is the title used to refer to the mystically imprisoned and cursed ruler of a domain. A Darklord was originally an individual who had committed a truly horrific crime, which drew the attention of the enigmatic Dark Powers. The Dark Powers then proceeded to craft a personal kingdom around the Darklord. This crafted domain serves both as a kingdom and a prison: the Darklord gains incredible powers whilst within its borders but can never leave it, although most Darklords can seal their domain borders with a thought. Within their domains, the Darklords are forever tormented by the objects of their desires, which are often the objects for which they committed their crimes.

=== Vistani ===
The Vistani are a nomadic ethnic group. They are based on depictions of the Romani people. Since their introduction in the original Ravenloft module (1983) as fortune-tellers, they became a unifying element in the Ravenloft and the Masque of the Red Death campaign settings, which offer Gothic horror scenarios. In a Ravenloft adventure, the Vistani have some control of the Mists of Ravenloft, which divide realms, while the players are generally confined to a region from which they must escape by solving one or more problems. Players generally need help from the Vistani to travel reliably from one open realm to another.

The Vistani people were "described as superstitious" and had "abilities to curse and hypnotize players or cast spells like Evil Eye". They were also originally stereotyped "as 'uncivilized' and heavy drinkers", but this portrayal was removed in the adventure module Curse of Strahd Revamped (2020). Their portrayal was further retconned in Van Richten's Guide to Ravenloft (2021); the Vistani people are no longer considered superstitious but instead focused on their traditional practices and their abilities are grounded in the forms of magic found in Dungeons & Dragons.

The fictional character Rudolph van Richten, a famous Monster Hunter in Ravenloft and author of a series of guides to hunting and slaying various monsters, had a great enmity for the Vistani for most of his monster-hunting career, but his opinion improved during his penning of Van Richten's Guide To The Vistani, during which he befriended a mortu (a Vistani outcast).

== Reception ==
Game designer Rick Swan commented in 1994 that when the Ravenloft setting first came out, it "just didn't seem special, a Forgotten Realms variant with a few more bats", but after supplements like Forbidden Lore, The Created, and the Van Richten's Guide series, Swan felt that "the Ravenloft campaign has proven to be a credible adventure alternative for players interested in the dark side of the AD&D game. Though it lacks the flamboyance of Call of Cthulhu and the, er, bite of Vampire, the Ravenloft setting remains the hobby's most enduring fusion of horror and fantasy".

Darker Days Radio declared Ravenloft the "greatest D&D campaign setting", citing the unique gothic horror elements and classic villains such as Azalin Rex.

In the Io9 series revisiting older Dungeons & Dragons novels, Rob Bricken highlighted that Vampire of the Mists "isn't scary, per se, but Strahd wreaks enough horror and carnage to drive home that Ravenloft is much, much more sinister than the Forgotten Realms. [...] Ravenloft (and I guess Forgotten Realms) vampires have all the tropes: They can turn into bats, wolves, and mists, and they don't cast reflections. They can control animals and enthrall people, to a degree. They can't cross running water, and they have to be invited into a home to enter. Unless they're an extremely powerful vampire like Strahd, natch".

Shelly Jones, in the journal Analog Game Studies: Volume IV, highlighted the Tarokka Deck mechanic used in both the original Ravenloft (1983) module and the 5th edition Curse of Strahd (2016) module to add randomization to the game and increase replayability. Jones wrote: "The Tarokka Deck incorporates an inconsistency in the game play that reflects fragmented traumatic memory and reifies the inconsistency present within an abusive relationship". Jones also highlighted that "without sunshine as a key time-tracking element, players are forced to rely upon other means to signal the passage of time within Barovia. Further adding to that disorientation is the knowledge that the players have been abandoned from anything familiar or real. [...] This alienating effect, based upon the physical environment as well as the psychological manifestations, traumatizes characters".

The Ravenloft setting has been criticized "for reinforcing harmful stereotypes through its portrayal of the Vistani, an in-fiction analogue for the Roma people". In 2020, Wizards of the Coast announced "in the editorial process for Strahd's reprint, as well as two upcoming products, Wizards worked with a Romani consultant to present the Vistani without using reductive tropes". On this update, Jon Ryan, for IGN, wrote that "it's worth noting that the book's illustrations of the Vistani still evoke Romani culture, and some players may still associate certain abilities [...] with outdated cultural stereotypes". Julie Muncy, for Io9, criticized the "granular changes" to the Vistani people as not very extensive and that "while there's a real opportunity here to do better work—the aforementioned diversity pledge also mentioned future works that will feature the Vistani people and aim to complicate their depictions—starting that work with a fancy collector's edition feels less like a promise to do better and more like a victory lap". Muncy also highlighted that the unrevised parts, such as the art and specific magical abilities, still lean "into tropes that suggest the Romani have mystical, dangerous powers, tropes that have been used in the past to target Romani for persecution".

Christian Hoffer, for ComicBook.com, highlighted that in Van Richten's Guide to Ravenloft (2021) the Domains of Dread "all now function as originally intended: prisons meant to torture specific souls. Many of the original Ravenloft domains featured strange punishments that didn't necessarily fit the crime of the Darklord. The revised domains are usually a better utilization of the ironic intent that flavors the immortal prisons of Ravenloft. The domains also now include a variety of different horror genres rather than a fixation on gothic horror. Finally, much of the misogynistic, colonialist, or racist elements have been purged out of this new iteration of Ravenloft. Although these changes will likely be the most talked about part of the book in some circles, these changes seem to have occurred naturally during the course of updating Ravenloft to reflect more diverse horror genres and to make the domains conform to Ravenloft's internal laws".

In his 2023 book Monsters, Aliens, and Holes in the Ground, RPG historian Stu Horvath noted, "In many ways, Strahd is a vessel for the audience's relationship with an ever-changing and evolving vampire legend. While a character in his own right, he is broadly drawn, so every group of players can make him their own. There are many Strahds, each defined by the tastes of the people at the table."

== Official products ==
Ravenloft has acted as the official campaign setting for multiple Dungeons & Dragons roleplaying adventure modules, sourcebooks and accessories. It has also been the main setting for novels and video games.

=== Video games ===
- Ravenloft: Strahd's Possession PC game (1994)
- Ravenloft: Stone Prophet PC game (1995)
- Iron & Blood: Warriors of Ravenloft PlayStation 1 game (1996)
- Dungeons & Dragons Online PC game expansion "Mists of Ravenloft" (2017)
- Neverwinter (video game) expansion module Ravenloft; Windows, Xbox One, PS4 (June 26, 2018)

== In other media ==
- In 2016, Wizards of the Coast added an additional license option to their 5th Edition Dungeons & Dragons open game license. It allows individuals and third party publishers to create and sell content based on specific Wizards of the Coast intellectual property, if the content is sold through the Dungeon Masters Guild storefront. Multiple third party supplements and adventures set in Ravenloft have since been released through this program.
- Tales From the Mists (2019–2020) was an official actual play series which streamed on the Dungeons & Dragons Twitch and YouTube channels. TK Johnson was the show's Dungeon Master with a "cast of four players (Lysa Chen, Kayla Cline, Hadeel Al-Massari, and Ashley Warren) plus two rotating party slots filled by new players every four episodes". The first season was set in the city of Harmonia in the Kartakass Domain of Dread; each character is from a different domain of Ravenloft. Christian Hoffer, for ComicBook.com, wrote: "One of Tales from the Mists' greatest strengths is that it feels very much like a gothic horror story, with an emphasis on death, the macabre, and terror lurking right around the corner. [...] While Dungeons & Dragons is perhaps best known for its combat encounters, Tales from the Mists seems to take its gothic horror roots seriously. [...] This might be an adjustment from how some people think of Dungeons & Dragons, but Tales from the Mists is a masterclass on how to run a horror campaign using mood and environment to set the tone instead of a constant parade of scary monsters".
- The Black Dice Society (2021–2022) was an official actual play streaming series broadcast on the Dungeons & Dragons channels which premiered on April 1, 2021, and is set across multiple Domains of Dread in Ravenloft. B. Dave Walters was the show's Dungeon Master with a cast of six players: Tanya DePass, Noura Ibrahim, Deejay Knight, Mark Meer, Saige Ryan and Becca Scott.
- A live-action series is being developed at Netflix, as of September 2026. The show is being written by John August, who will also produce alongside Alfonso Cuarón and Hasbro Entertainment.
