= Ravenloft II: The House on Gryphon Hill =

Dungeons & Dragons adventure module

- Code: I10
- Rules required: 1st Ed AD&D
- Character levels: 8–10
- Campaign setting: Generic AD&D
- Authors: Tracy and Laura Hickman
- First published: 1986
- ISBN: 9780880383226

Linked modules
- I6 I10

Ravenloft II: The House on Gryphon Hill is a Dungeons & Dragons module written for use with the First Edition Advanced Dungeons & Dragons ruleset, by TSR.

== Plot summary ==
Ravenloft II: The House on Gryphon Hill shares structural elements with the original Ravenloft module, including variable goals for non-player characters and variable locations of important objects, so that Gryphon Hill does not play the same way each time. The module includes 11 cards that are used to randomly determine the identity of the vampire as well as the location of items that need to be recovered as part of the plot. The module's plot features an artifact known as "The Apparatus" that switches the personality of a monster with that of an ordinary person in town; player characters, therefore, are uncertain about the true identity of the people they meet.

== Contents ==
The module introduces Azalin the lich, who was later used as an important character as part of the Ravenloft campaign setting. This module can be played on its own or played as a sequel to the original Ravenloft. It details the town of Mordentshire, as well as haunted moors, and the Gryphon manor house, all laid out on maps in perspective like the original module.

The adventure book is 48 pages and includes a large color map and an outer folder. The pack includes several player handouts, pre-generated player characters and a map, all of which are designed to match the booklet text; also included is an event chart, where daily pre-set events are logged for the Dungeon Master, who can add additional events.

== Publication history ==
Ravenloft's success led to this 1986 sequel. Although Tracy Hickman and Laura Hickman were credited with writing Ravenloft II, they left TSR before the module was completed. The writing was done by David "Zeb" Cook, Jeff Grubb, Harold Johnson, and Douglas Niles, following the Hickmans' outline. Each writer pursued a different section of the module to meet the deadline. Clyde Caldwell, who had done all of the art for the original Ravenloft module, provided the cover, and interior art was done by Jeff Easley. The adventure is designed for first edition Advanced Dungeons & Dragons characters of levels 8 through 10.

== Reception ==
Carl Sargent reviewed Ravenloft II in issue 87 of White Dwarf magazine, where he stated that it was a "strong sequel to I6 Ravenloft" and recommended it highly. He noted that the plotline is very complex, with interactions between PCs and NPCs being much more important, and that key events help keep the action going and provide direction for the adventure. Sargent criticized the sequel for having over-the-top minor encounters, and warned that the complexity of the plot would require careful preparation. He pointed out that the module includes play and time-keeping aids, and felt that the adventure was worth the extra effort. Sargent highly recommended Ravenloft II for "lots of monsters, plenty of roleplaying, lots of offstage action, items and crucial information to be gathered, and ... an excellent ending." Lawrence Schick also commented on the sequel in his 1991 book Heroic Worlds, describing it as "Gang-written just before deadline by the whole TSR design staff. The vampire Strahd returns in a gothic adventure of Things Man Was Not Meant to Know."

Tom Zunder reviewed Ravenloft II: The House on Gryphon Hill for the British magazine Adventurer #8 (March 1987). He declared that "this scenario is one excellent, if not the most excellent example of the genre. Following, as is so totally correct for the genre, the original Ravenloft scenario (I6), Tracy and Laura Hickman have quite superlatively re-created the style and atmosphere of the classic vampire tale, whilst at the same time never allowing the players a plot line transparent in simplicity." He commented that The House on Gryphon Hill was "not quite a sequel to the first adventure, nor is it a prequel, but rather a parallel story, and the idea of running both I6 and I10 in an interweaved nightmare would indeed make for a classic scenario". He felt that the interaction between the entranced player and DM "makes for rapid referee integration of the information, but since the opening days of the adventure are more involved than the inevitable false calm of all horror film beginnings, this should be no problem to do between sessions". He commented that the module is "well-written, with a clear and accurate plot description leading in to atmospheric and well-written chapters on the various major locations" and felt that the event chart made "referee control and understanding of the scenario easy and clear". Zunder went on to say that "the players' sense of reality is excellently broken down, perturbing events are mixed with just enough sanity to never allow any security of expectation. The resolution is subtly tragic, with a mix of scientific and supernatural so necessary in this type of tale. The potential for running this scenario with any other RPG is enormous. Indeed, it would be especially suitable for a late 19th C or early 10th Century RPG, such as Justice Inc. or CoC. All in all, an excellent product, recommended for nearly everyone."
