= Ravenloft: Realm of Terror =

1990 role-playing game accessory

- Author: Bruce Nesmith and Andria Hayday
- Genre: Role-playing game
- Publisher: TSR
- Publication date: 1990
- Media type: Boxed set

Ravenloft: Realm of Terror is a boxed set accessory published in 1990 for the Ravenloft campaign setting for the Advanced Dungeons & Dragons fantasy role-playing game.

== Contents ==
Ravenloft: Realm of Terror is a supplement of rules for including Gothic horror in Dungeons & Dragons. The supplement describes each of the 34 domains, or "countries", of Ravenloft, now expanded from the 1st Edition which only featured the castle of the vampire Strahd von Zarovich in Barovia. The domains, described in varying degrees of detail, are each "ruled by an incredibly evil individual". The module outlines the six reward levels a player can receive from pursuing evil deeds from a hit point boost to rule of a small land. The product comprises the following aspects:

Fear and horror checks (a la Call of Cthulhu), the altered effects of spells and magic items, new monsters, exciting information about gypsies and fortune-telling in RPGs, and information about the individual domains and their rulers.

== Publication history ==
Ravenloft: Realm of Terror was written by Bruce Nesmith and Andria Hayday, with a cover by Clyde Caldwell, and was published by TSR in 1990 as a boxed set with a 144-page book, four large color maps, 24 cardstock sheets, and a transparent map overlay.

The supplement was previewed in Dragon #160 and Dragon #162. Published in June 1990, Ravenloft: Realm of Terror was the first boxed set for the Ravenloft campaign setting and the fifth major world for Dungeons & Dragons. It was created by Bruce Nesmith with Andria Hayday. The supplement contained Dungeons & Dragons first fear and horror check rules; "this sort of 'psychological saving throw' originated with Call of Cthulhu's sanity checks and soon become de rigeur [sic] for the horror genre". It also contained variant monster rules, new rules for curses and fortune-telling, and outlined consequences for characters slipping into the evil alignment. The supplement introduced the Demiplane of Dread, outlined the different domains within it including Barovia and Mordent, and added the quirk that the demiplane acts as a changeable living realm. Similar to Spelljammer, the supplement also contained "a way to crossover all the existing TSR settings. Gates from the Forgotten Realms, Greyhawk, Krynn, and the Oriental Adventures realm of Kara-Tur are all detailed in this book, while some of the domain lords are also crossovers from those settings".

Shannon Appelcline, author of Designers & Dragons, highlighted that Ravenloft: Realm of Terror focused on Gothic horror unlike other RPG horror competitors which focused on cosmic horror or modern horror. Appelcline wrote that "a year after the release of Ravenloft, White Wolf's Vampire: The Masquerade (1991) appeared. [...] Its popularity caused TSR management to request that Ravenloft move 'toward a darker, more psychologically sinister outlook'. The Ravenloft designers refused, and the success of that decision would soon become obvious. The Ravenloft line ran for a decade and a half through three major editions".

== Reception ==
Stewart Wieck reviewed the product in a 1990 issue of White Wolf. He rated the game overall at a 4 out of 5 points, just missing a perfect score—primarily due to an excessive number of domains. He stated a positive as the "advice that the authors give on running a true gothic horror campaign or adventure".

In 1991, it won the Origins Award for Best Graphic Presentation of a Roleplaying Game, Adventure, or Supplement of 1990.

Lawrence Schick, in his 1991 book Heroic Worlds, describes the set's fold-up castles as "scary".

In 2013, Alex Lucard, for Diehard GameFAN, wrote that he felt Ravenloft: Realm of Terror was "far more accessible than Domains of Dread, which was the hardcover re-launch of the campaign setting post the Grand Conjunction. Domains of Dread requires you to know what happened in the Dark Domain before the Grand Conjunction [...]. Realm of Terror is simply easier for gamers of all levels to appreciate, more accessible by far and, well, it features better art in my opinion. [...] Realm of Terror gave you everything you needed to delve into the Ravenloft campaign setting. You had a 144-page softcover book which gave you in-depth information about the Dark Domain, all of its locations and various Darklords, and it was simply a wonderfully fresh take on 2e D&D. [...] Words cannot express how much I would love to see this thing be made electronically".

== Reviews ==
- Challenge #46 (1990)
- Casus Belli #61
