= List of Ravenloft publications =

Ravenloft has acted as the official campaign setting for multiple Dungeons & Dragons roleplaying adventure modules, sourcebooks and accessories. It has also been the main setting for novels and video games.

== TSR roleplaying products (1983–2000) ==
Title	Code	TSR#	Author(s)	Date	ISBN	Levels	Notes
Ravenloft	I6	9075	Tracy & Laura Hickman	1983	ISBN 0-88038042-X	5-7	AD&D 1st ed. adventure module
Ravenloft II: The House on Gryphon Hill	I10	9181	Tracy Hickman, Laura Hickman	1986	ISBN 9780880383226	8-10	AD&D 1st ed. adventure module
Master of Ravenloft		8956	Jean Blashfield	January 1986	ISBN 0-88038-261-9	Solo reader	Advanced Dungeons & Dragons Adventure Gamebooks
Ravenloft: Realm of Terror		1050	Bruce Nesmith, Andria Hayday	1990	ISBN 0-88038-853-6		AD&D 2nd ed. Campaign Setting boxed set.
Feast of Goblyns	RA1	9298	Blake Mobley	1990	ISBN 0-88038-877-3	4-7	AD&D 2nd ed. adventure module
Vecna Lives!	WGA4	9309	David Cook (game designer)	1990	ISBN 0-88038-897-8	12-15	AD&D 2nd ed. adventure module. Although set in the World of Greyhawk Campaign Setting, there is considerable crossover material used later in the Ravenloft setting, acting as an in-game story means of trapping Vecna inside the Demi-plane of Ravenloft as a Darklord.
Ship of Horror	RA2	9321	Anne Brown	1991	ISBN 1-56076-127-X	8-10	AD&D 2nd ed. adventure module
Touch of Death	RA3	9338	Bruce Nesmith	1991	ISBN 1-56076-144-X	3-5	AD&D 2nd ed. adventure module
Monstrous Compendium Ravenloft Appendix	MC10	2122		1991	ISBN 1-56076-108-3		AD&D 2nd ed. accessory
Darklords	RR1	9331		1991	ISBN 1-56076-137-7	5+	AD&D 2nd ed. accessory
Book of Crypts	RR2	9336	Dale "Slade" Henson with J. Robert King	1991	ISBN 1-56076-142-3	3+	AD&D 2nd ed. accessory
Van Richten's Guide to Vampires	RR3	9345	Nigel D. Findley	1991	ISBN 1-56076-151-2		AD&D 2nd ed. accessory
Islands of Terror	RR4	9348	Colin McComb, Scott Bennie	1992	ISBN 1-56076-349-3		AD&D 2nd ed. accessory
Van Richten's Guide to Ghosts	RR5	9355	William W. Connors	1992	ISBN 1-56076-351-5		AD&D 2nd ed. accessory
Forbidden Lore		1079	William W. Connors, Bruce Nesmith	1992	ISBN 1-56076-354-X		AD&D 2nd ed. accessory/campaign expansion boxed set.
Night of the Walking Dead	RQ1	9352	Bill Slavicsek	1992	ISBN 1-56076-350-7	1-3	AD&D 2nd ed. adventure module
Thoughts of Darkness	RQ2	9364	David Wise	1992	ISBN 1-56076-353-1	12-15	AD&D 2nd ed. adventure module
From the Shadows	RQ3	9375	Bruce Nesmith	1992	ISBN 1-56076-356-6	9-12	AD&D 2nd ed. adventure module
Castles Forlorn		1088	Lisa Smedman	1993	ISBN	4-6	AD&D 2nd ed. adventure boxed set
Van Richten's Guide to the Lich	RS1 (RR6)	9412	Eric. W. Haddock	1993	ISBN 1-56076-572-0		AD&D 2nd ed. accessory
Van Richten's Guide to Werebeasts	RR7	9416	Nigel Findley	1993	ISBN 1-56076-633-6		AD&D 2nd ed. accessory
Monstrous Compendium Ravenloft Appendix II: Creatures of the Night	MC15	2139		1993	ISBN 1-56076-586-0		AD&D 2nd ed. accessory
Roots of Evil	RM1	9413	Eric Haddock, David Wise	1993	ISBN 1-56076-597-6	9-12	AD&D 2nd ed. adventure module
The Created	RM2	9414	Bruce Nesmith	1993	ISBN 1-56076-610-7	2-4	AD&D 2nd ed. adventure module
Web of Illusion	RM3	9415	William W. Connors	1993	ISBN 1-56076-618-2	7-9	AD&D 2nd ed. adventure module
House of Strahd	RM4	9418	Tracy & Laura Hickman	1993	ISBN 1-56076-671-9	6-13	AD&D 2nd ed. adventure module
Dark of the Moon	RM5	9419	L. Richard Baker III	1993	ISBN 1-56076-688-3	5-9	AD&D 2nd ed. adventure module
Masque of the Red Death and Other Tales		1103	William W. Connors, D.J. Heinrich, Shane Hensley & Colin McComb	1994	ISBN 1-56076-877-0		AD&D 2nd ed. campaign expansion boxed set.
Ravenloft Campaign Setting		1108	Bruce Nesmith, Andria Hayday & William W. Connors	1994	ISBN 1-56076-942-4		AD&D 2nd ed. campaign setting boxed set.
Van Richten's Guide to the Created	RR8	9417	Teeuwynn Woodruff	1994	ISBN 1-56076-819-3		AD&D 2nd ed. accessory
Van Richten's Guide to the Ancient Dead	RR9	9451	Skip Williams	1994	ISBN 1-56076-873-8		AD&D 2nd ed. accessory
Ravenloft Monstrous Compendium Appendix III: Creatures of Darkness		2153	Kirk Botulla, Shane Hensley, Nicky Rea & Teeuwynn Woodruff	1994	ISBN 1-56076-914-9		AD&D 2nd ed. accessory
Adam's Wrath	RM6	9439	Lisa Smedman	1994	ISBN 1-56076-833-9	5-7	AD&D 2nd ed. adventure module
The Awakening	RM7	9452	Lisa Smedman	1994	ISBN 1-56076-883-5	4-6	AD&D 2nd ed. adventure module
Hour of the Knife	RM8	9456	Bruce Nesmith & Lisa Smedman	1994	ISBN 1-56076-892-4	4-6	AD&D 2nd ed. adventure module
Howls in the Night	RM9	9466	Colin McComb	1994	ISBN 1-56076-927-0	3-5	AD&D 2nd ed. adventure module
Castle of the Undead		8089	Nick Baron	1994	ISBN 1-56076-836-3	Solo reader	AD&D 2nd ed. Ravenloft Endless Quest #38 (series 2)
The Nightmare Lands		1124	Shane Lacy Hensley, Bill Slavicsek	1995	ISBN 0-7869-0174-8		AD&D 2nd ed. campaign expansion boxed set.
Van Richten's Guide to Fiends	RR10	9477	Teeuwyn Woodruff	1995	ISBN 0-7869-0122-5		AD&D 2nd ed. accessory
Chilling Tales	RR11	9495	Lisa Smedman	1995	ISBN 0-7869-0142-X	3-9	AD&D 2nd ed. accessory
Van Richten's Guide to the Vistani	RR12	9496	David Wise	1995	ISBN 0-7869-0122-5		AD&D 2nd ed. accessory
The Gothic Earth Gazetteer		9498	William W. Connors	1995	ISBN 0-7869-0193-4		AD&D 2nd ed. accessory
When Black Roses Bloom	RM10	9476	Lisa Smedman	1995	ISBN 0-7869-0101-2	4-6	AD&D 2nd ed. adventure module
Circle of Darkness	RM11	9493	Drew Bittner	1995	ISBN 0-7869-0128-4	5-7	AD&D 2nd ed. adventure module
The Evil Eye	RM12	9497	Steve Kurtz	1995	ISBN 0-7869-0167-5	4-6	AD&D 2nd ed. adventure module
Neither Man Nor Beast	RM13	9499	Jeff Grubb	1995	ISBN 0-7869-0205-1	1-4	AD&D 2nd ed. adventure module
Night of the Tiger		8096	Jean Rabe	1995	ISBN 0-7869-0114-4	Solo reader	AD&D 2nd ed. Ravenloft Endless Quest #44 (series 2)
Bleak House: The Death of Rudolph van Richten		1141	William W. Connors & Dave Gross with Steve Miller (game designer)	1996			AD&D 2nd ed. adventure/campaign boxed set.
Requiem: The Grim Harvest		1146	William W. Connors & Lisa Smedman	1996	ISBN 0-7869-0431-3	6-10	AD&D 2nd ed. Campaign expansion boxed set.
A Light in the Belfry		9494	William W. Connors	1996	ISBN 0-7869-0133-0	6-8	AD&D 2nd ed. Adventure audio CD boxed set.
A Guide to Transylvania		9529	Nicky Rea	1996	ISBN 0-7869-0424-0		AD&D 2nd ed. accessory
Forged of Darkness		9510	William W. Connors	1996	ISBN 0-7869-0369-4		AD&D 2nd ed. accessory
Children of the Night: Vampires		9513	Paul Culotta & Steve Miller with Jonathan Ariadne Caspian & Carol L. Johnson	1996	ISBN 0-7869-0378-3		AD&D 2nd ed. accessory and adventure
Ravenloft Monstrous Compendium Appendices I & II		2162	William W. Connors	1996	ISBN 0-7869-0392-9		AD&D 2nd ed. accessory (Reprints MC10 Ravenloft Appendix (I) and MC15 Ravenloft Appendix II)
Death Unchained	RM14	9523	Lisa Smedman	1996	ISBN 0-7869-0408-9	1-4	AD&D 2nd ed. adventure module
Death Ascendant	RM15	9526	Lisa Smedman	1996	ISBN 0-7869-0414-3	6-8	AD&D 2nd ed. adventure module
Domains of Dread		2174	William W. Connors & Steve Miller	1997	ISBN 0-7869-0672-3		AD&D 2nd ed. campaign setting hardcover book
Children of the Night: Ghosts		9555	The Kargat (Ann Brown, et al.)	1997	ISBN 0-7869-0752-5		AD&D 2nd ed. accessory
Castle Spulzeer		9544	Doug Stewart	1997	ISBN 0-7869-0669-3	8-12	AD&D 2nd ed. adventure module (Forgotten Realms/Ravenloft crossover)
The Forgotten Terror		9537	William W. Connors	1997	ISBN 0-7869-0699-5	10-12	AD&D 2nd ed. adventure module (Forgotten Realms/Ravenloft crossover)
Champions of the Mists		9559	William W. Connors	1998	ISBN 0-7869-0765-7		AD&D 2nd ed. accessory
Children of the Night: Werebeasts		9583	William W. Connors	1998	ISBN 0-7869-1202-2		AD&D 2nd ed. accessory
Introduction to the Land of the Mists		91271	William W. Connors	1998			AD&D 2nd ed. accessory (free fold-out map)
Servants of Darkness		9541	Kevin Melka & Steve Miller	1998	ISBN 0-7869-0659-6	4-6	AD&D 2nd ed. adventure module
The Shadow Rift		1163	William W. Connors, Cindi Rice & John D. Rateliff	1998	ISBN 0-7869-0737-1	4-6	AD&D 2nd ed. adventure module
Vecna Reborn		9582	Monte Cook	1998	ISBN 0-7869-1201-4	5-7	AD&D 2nd ed. adventure module
Carnival		11382	John W. Mangrum & Steve Miller	1999	ISBN 0-7869-1382-7		AD&D 2nd ed. accessory
Children of the Night: The Created		11360	The Kargat	1999	ISBN 0-7869-1360-6	Level	AD&D 2nd ed. accessory
Ravenloft (module)		11397	Tracy & Laura Hickman	1999	ISBN 0-7869-1201-4	5-7	AD&D 2nd ed. adventure module (Silver Anniversary Collector's Edition, RPGA exclusive)
TSR JAM 1999		11445		1999	ISBN 0-7869-1445-9		AD&D (2nd ed.) RPGA adventure anthology module (for several Dungeons & Dragons settings)
Die Vecna Die!		11662	Bruce R. Cordell & Steve Miller	1999	ISBN 0-7869-1445-9	10-13	AD&D (2nd ed.) RPGA adventure module (Greyhawk/ Ravenloft/ Planescape campaign crossover)
Van Richten's Monster Hunter's Compendium Volume One		11447	Nigel D. Findley & Teeuwyn Woodruff	1999	ISBN 0-7869-1447-5		AD&D (2nd ed.) accessory (reprint of Van Richten's Guide to Vampires, Van Richten's Guide to Werebeasts & Van Richten's Guide to the Created).
Van Richten's Monster Hunter's Compendium Volume Two		11507	William W. Connors, Eric W. Haddock, David Wise, Skip Williams & David Wuf	1999	ISBN 0-7869-1507-2		AD&D (2nd ed.) accessory (reprint of Van Richten's Guide to Ghosts, Van Richten's Guide to the Lich & Van Richten's Guide to the Ancient Dead).
Van Richten's Monster Hunter's Compendium Volume Three		11613	David Wise, Steve Miller & Teeuwyn Woodruff	2000	ISBN 0-7869-1613-3		AD&D (2nd ed.) accessory (Van Richten's Guide to Witches & reprint of Van Richten's Guide to Fiends, Van Richten's Guide to the Vistani).

== Sword & Sorcery Studios roleplaying products (2001–2005) ==
Title	Author(s)	Date	ISBN	Imprint	Levels	Notes
Ravenloft Campaign Setting: Core Rulebook (d20 3.0 Fantasy Roleplaying)	Andrew Cermak, John W. Mangrum & Andrew Wyatt	2001	ISBN 1-58846-075-4	Sword & Sorcery Studios		3rd ed. setting sourcebook. A hardback limited edition was also released with 3,000 copies.
Secrets of the Dread Realms	Andrew Cermak, John W. Mangrum & Andrew Wyatt	2001	ISBN 1-58846-076-2	Sword & Sorcery		3rd ed. supplement
Denizens of Darkness		2002	ISBN 1-58846-077-0	Sword & Sorcery		3rd ed. supplement
Champions of Darkness	Beth Bostic, Carla Hollar & Tadd McDivitt	2002	ISBN 1-58846-081-9	Sword & Sorcery		3rd ed. supplement
Van Richten's Arsenal Volume I	Andrew Cernak, John W. Mangrum, Ryan Naylor, Chris Nichols & Andrew Wyatt	2002	ISBN 1-58846-079-7	Sword & Sorcery		3rd ed. supplement
Heroes of Light	Brian Campbell, James Lowder & Peter Woodworth	2002	ISBN 1-58846-082-7	Sword & Sorcery		3rd ed. supplement
Ravenloft Gazetteer Volume I	Andrew Cernak, John W. Mangrum, Chris Nichols & Andrew Wyatt	2002	ISBN 1-58846-080-0	Sword & Sorcery		3rd ed. supplement
Ravenloft Dungeon Master's Guide (d20 3.5 Fantasy Roleplaying)	Brian Campbell, Carla Hollar, Rucht Lilavivat, John W. Mangrum, Anthony Pryor, Peter Woodworth & Andrew Wyatt	2003	ISBN 1-58846-084-3	Sword & Sorcery		3.5 ed. core rulebook
Ravenloft Player's Handbook (d20 3.5 Fantasy Roleplaying)	Jackie Cassada, Andrew Cernak, John W. Mangrum, Nicky Rea & Andrew Wyatt	2003	ISBN 1-58846-091-6	Sword & Sorcery		3.5 ed. core rulebook
Van Richten's Guide to the Walking Dead	Rucht Lilavivat & Ryan Naylor	2003	ISBN 1-58846-085-1	Sword & Sorcery		3rd ed. supplement
Ravenloft Tarokka Deck	Jackie Cassada & Nicky Rea	2003	ISBN 1-58846-090-8	Sword & Sorcery		3rd ed. accessory (66 cards)
Ravenloft Gazetteer Volume II	John W. Mangrum, Ryan Naylor, Chris Nichols & Andrew Wyatt	2003	ISBN 1-58846-830-5	Sword & Sorcery		3rd ed. supplement
Ravenloft Gazetteer Volume III	John W. Mangrum, Stuart Turner, Peter Woodworth & Andrew Wyatt	2003	ISBN 1-58846-086-X	Sword & Sorcery		3rd ed. supplement
Ravenloft Gazetteer Volume IV	James Lowder, John W. Mangrum, Ryan Naylor, Anthony Pyor, Voronica Whitney-Robinson & Andrew Wyatt	2003	ISBN 1-58846-087-8	Sword & Sorcery		3rd ed. supplement
Ravenloft Denizens of Dread		2004	ISBN 1-58846-951-4	Sword & Sorcery		3.5 ed. core rulebook
Masque of the Red Death (d20 3.5 Fantasy Roleplaying, Ravenloft Campaign)	Jackie Cassada, Claire Hoffman, Carla Hollar, Harold Johnson, Rucht Lilavivat, Nicky Rea, Andrew Scott & Peter Woodworth	2004	ISBN 1-58846-979-4	Sword & Sorcery		3.5 ed. campaign setting sourcebook
Van Richten's Guide to the Shadow Fey	Brett King, Rucht Lilavivat, Tadd McDivitt & Penny Williams	2004	ISBN 1-58846-088-6	Sword & Sorcery		3.5 ed. campaign setting supplement
Ravenloft: Legacy of the Blood - Great Families of the Core	Steve Miller, Anthony Pryor, Penny Williams & Skip Williams	2004	ISBN 1-58846-089-4	Sword & Sorcery		3.5 ed. campaign setting supplement
Ravenloft Gazetteer Volume V	Andrew Cernak, John W. Mangrum, Steve Miller, Ryan Naylor & Andrew Wyatt	2004	ISBN 1-58846-964-6	Sword & Sorcery		3.5 ed. campaign setting supplement
Ravenloft: Dark Tales & Disturbing Legends	Harold Johnson, Brett King, Ari Marmell, Steve Miller & Ryan Naylor	2005	ISBN 1-58846-787-2	Sword & Sorcery		3.5 ed. campaign setting supplement
Van Richten's Guide to the Mists	Carla Hollar & Rucht Lilavivat	2005	N/A	Sword & Sorcery		3.5 ed. campaign setting supplement. Never published due to licensing expiration but was released online instead as an unproofed manuscript.

== Wizards of the Coast roleplaying products (2006–present) ==
Title	Author(s)	Date	ISBN	Imprint	Levels	Notes
Expedition to Castle Ravenloft	Bruce R. Cordell & James Wyatt	2006	ISBN 0-7869-3946-X	Wizards of the Coast	6-10	3.5 ed. adventure module
Castle Ravenloft	Bill Slavicsek, Mike Mearls and Peter Lee	2010	ISBN 978-0-7869-5557-2	Wizards of the Coast	—N/a	D&D Adventure System board game
Dungeons & Dragons 5th edition
Curse of Strahd	Christopher Perkins, Tracy & Laura Hickman, Adam Lee, Richard Whitters, Jeremy Crawford	March 15, 2016	ISBN 978-0-7869-6598-4	Wizards of the Coast	1-10	5th ed. adventure module
Dungeon Master's Screen: Curse of Strahd		2016	—N/a	Gale Force Nine	—N/a	5th ed. accessory
Curse of Strahd: Tarokka Deck (version 1)		2016	—N/a	Gale Force Nine	—N/a	5th ed. accessory (54 card deck)
Curse of Strahd: Tarokka Deck (version 2)		2018	ISBN 978-0-7869-6658-5	Gale Force Nine	—N/a	5th ed. accessory (54 card deck)
Escape From Castle Ravenloft	Matt Forbeck	2019	ISBN 978-1-5362-0923-5	Candlewick Entertainment	Solo reader	5th ed. Endless Quest #54 (series 3)
Curse of Strahd: Revamped	Christopher Perkins, Tracy & Laura Hickman, Adam Lee, Richard Whitters, Jeremy Crawford	October 20, 2020	ISBN 9780786967155	Wizards of the Coast	1-10	5th ed. boxed set
Curse of Strahd: Legendary Edition	Christopher Perkins, Tracy & Laura Hickman, Adam Lee, Richard Whitters, Jeremy Crawford	2020	—N/a	Beadle & Grimm	1-10	5th ed. limited edition boxed set
Van Richten's Guide to Ravenloft	F. Wesley Schneider, Whitney Beltrán, Bill Benham, K. Tempest Bradford, Banana Chan, Jeremy Crawford, Dan Dillion, Crystal Frasier, Ajit George, Amanda Hamon, Cassandra Khaw, Renee Knipe, Kira Magrann, Lee Knox Ostertag, Ben Petrisor, Jessica Price, Taymoor Rehman, Jessica Ross, John Stavropoulos, Jabari Weathers, James Wyatt	May 18, 2021	ISBN 978-0786967254	Wizards of the Coast	—N/a	5th ed. campaign setting
Van Richten's Guide to Ravenloft: Shadowy Silver Edition	F. Wesley Schneider, Whitney Beltrán, Bill Benham, K. Tempest Bradford, Banana Chan, Jeremy Crawford, Dan Dillion, Crystal Frasier, Ajit George, Amanda Hamon, Cassandra Khaw, Renee Knipe, Kira Magrann, Lee Knox Ostertag, Ben Petrisor, Jessica Price, Taymoor Rehman, Jessica Ross, John Stavropoulos, Jabari Weathers, James Wyatt	May 18, 2021	—N/a	Beadle & Grimm	—N/a	5th ed. limited edition boxed set This limited edition was released with four variant covers: Gothic Horror (rose and fangs), Folk Horror (goat), Body Horror (eyeball), and Cosmic Horror (tentacles).
Dungeons & Dragons 5.5 edition
Ravenloft: The Horrors Within	TBA	June 16, 2026	ISBN 978 0 7869 7002 5	Wizards of the Coast	—N/a	5.5 ed. campaign setting; part of the "Season of Horror"; The alternative cover edition will have an early release, on June 2, 2026, in local game stores.
Tarokka Deck (version 3)	TBA	June 16, 2026	—N/a		—N/a	Part of the "Season of Horror"
The Horrors Within: Dungeon Master's Screen	TBA	June 16, 2026	—N/a		—N/a	Part of the "Season of Horror"
The Horrors Within: Map Pack	TBA	June 16, 2026	—N/a		—N/a	Part of the "Season of Horror"
Horrified: Dungeons & Dragons – Ravenloft	TBA	July 19, 2026	—N/a	Ravensburger	—N/a	Board game; part of the "Season of Horror"

== Novels and comics (1991–present) ==
A number of tie-in novels and comics were released, set in the Demiplane of Dread:

- Vampire of the Mists (September 1991), by Christie Golden (ISBN 1-56076-155-5)
- Knight of the Black Rose (December 1991), by James Lowder (ISBN 1-56076-156-3)
- Dance of the Dead (June 1992), by Christie Golden (ISBN 1-56076-352-3)
- Heart of Midnight (December 1992), by J. Robert King (ISBN 1-56076-355-8)
- Tapestry of Dark Souls (March 1993), by Elaine Bergstrom (ISBN 1-56076-571-2)
- Carnival of Fear (July 1993), by J. Robert King (ISBN 1-56076-628-X)
- I, Strahd: The Memoirs of a Vampire (September 1993), by P. N. Elrod (ISBN 0-7869-0175-6)
- The Enemy Within (February 1994), by Christie Golden (ISBN 1-56076-887-8)
- Mordenheim (May 1994), by Chet Williamson (ISBN 1-56076-852-5)
- Tales of Ravenloft (September 1994), Edited by Brian Thomsen (ISBN 1-56076-931-9)
- Tower of Doom (November 1994), by Mark Anthony (ISBN 0-7869-0062-8)
- Baroness of Blood (March 1995), by Elaine Bergstrom (ISBN 0-7869-0146-2)
- Death of a Darklord (June 1995), by Laurell K. Hamilton (ISBN 0-7869-4122-7)
- Scholar of Decay (December 1995), by Tanya Huff (ISBN 0-7869-0206-X)
- King of the Dead (March 1996), by Gene DeWeese (ISBN 0-7869-0483-6)
- To Sleep with Evil (September 1996), by Andria Cardarelle (ISBN 0-7869-0515-8)
- Lord of the Necropolis (November 1997), by Gene DeWeese (ISBN 0-7869-0660-X)
- Shadowborn (March 1998), by Carrie Bebris and William Connors (ISBN 0-7869-0766-5)
- I, Strahd: The War Against Azalin (June 1998), by P. N. Elrod (ISBN 0-7869-0754-1)
- Spectre of the Black Rose (March 1999), by James Lowder and Voronica Whitney-Robinson (ISBN 0-7869-1333-9)
- Before I Wake, by Ari Marmell (October 2007) A short story released for free on the Wotc website with the announcement of new novels in publication.
- Heaven's Bones (Dominion) (September 2008), by Samantha Henderson (ISBN 0-7869-5111-7)
- Mithras Court: A Novel of the Mists (Dominion) (November 2008), by David A. Page (ISBN 0-7869-5068-4)
- Black Crusade, by Ari Marmell released for free on the Wizards of the Coast website
- Dungeons and Dragons: Shadows of the Vampire #1–5 (May–October 2016), written by Jim Zub, and illustrated by Max Dunbar and Nelson Daniel
  - Dungeons and Dragons: Shadows of the Vampire (Trade paperback, November 2016, (ISBN 1-63140-766-X)
  - Dungeons & Dragons: Days of Endless Adventure (Trade paperback compilation which includes Dungeons and Dragons: Shadows of the Vampire, March 2020, ISBN 978-1-68405-275-2)
- Dungeons and Dragons: Orphan of Agony Isle #1–4 (June–October 2022), written by Casey Gilly and illustrated by Bayleigh Underwood
  - Dungeons and Dragons: Orphan of Agony Isle (Trade paperback, March 2023, ISBN 978-1-68405-956-0)
- Ravenloft: Heir of Strahd (May 2025), by Delilah S. Dawson (ISBN 9780593599778)
- Dungeons & Dragons: Ravenloft #1–4 (August 2026), written by Amy Chu and illustrated by Ariela Kristantina [upcoming]
