= I, Strahd: The Memoirs of a Vampire =

1993 novel by P. N. Elrod

- Cover of the first edition
- Author: P. N. Elrod
- Cover artist: Clyde Caldwell
- Language: English
- Series: Ravenloft series
- Genre: Fantasy novel
- Published: 1993
- Publication place: United States
- Media type: Print
- ISBN: 0-7869-0175-6
- Preceded by: Carnival of Fear
- Followed by: The Enemy Within

I, Strahd: The Memoirs of a Vampire is a 1993 fantasy horror novel by P. N. Elrod, set in the world of Ravenloft, and based on the Dungeons & Dragons game. Its plot centers on Strahd Von Zarovich as a former army commander, now residing in Ravenloft where he becomes involved in the dark arts because of the envy and regret he feels over lost youth.

== Plot ==
The novel is framed as a private journal discovered by the monster hunter Rudolph van Richten in the study of the vampire Strahd von Zarovich. In the immediate aftermath of Strahd's conquest of the land of Barovia, his second-in-command Alek Gwilym informs him that a covert assassin has infiltrated their camp. Though concerned, Strahd nonetheless leaves his camp with just his closest retainers to formally take possession of Barovia's central castle, which he renames "Ravenloft", in honor of his late mother, Queen Ravenia van Roeyen. At night, he tours the castle alone to bait out the assassin, who turns out to be a young officer named Illya Buchwold. Though wounded, Strahd manages to defeat him with the help of Alek and another young officer, Leo Dilisnya.

After settling down as the new lord of Barovia, Strahd is joined by his youngest brother Sergei, who was born after he had left on his conquest campaigns. Meeting Sergei for the first time makes Strahd yearn for his spent youth and fear his mortality. Soon thereafter, Sergei falls in love with a local peasant girl Tatyana, by whom Strahd is also immediately smitten. Jealous of Sergei and Tatyana's love, Strahd comes to believe that she rejects him because of their age difference and looks for a solution in dark magic. On the eve of Sergei and Tatyana's wedding, Strahd is visited by Death itself who offers him freedom from aging and Tatyana's love, which he accepts. When Alek witnesses this exchange, Strahd attacks and kills him, then drinks his blood on Death's orders. The next morning, he also murders Sergei and drinks his brother's blood to complete his transformation into an unaging vampire.

With his newfound vampiric powers, Strahd enchants Tatyana, making her forget Sergei and finally reciprocate his own advances. Before he can drink her blood, however, Leo Dilisnya, who has been the real assassin all along, launches a coup to take over Ravenloft and Barovia. With Strahd's spell over her broken, Tatyana jumps off the castle balcony to her death, while Strahd is shot by Leo's turncoats, who are unaware of his changed nature. Recovering quickly, Strahd counterattacks and kills the traitors, though Leo himself manages to escape. Strahd then sends his few surviving loyal guards away and locks himself in Ravenloft for a year, during which he searches in vain for Tatyana's body and learns to use his new powers, such as transforming into animals and raising corpses as undead servants. He then returns to ruling Barovia, which has been cut off from the rest of the world by impassable toxic mists on the night that Tatyana died.

Half a century after his transformation, Strahd visits Lady Lovina Wachter in the guise of "Lord Vasili von Holtz". Having survived Leo's coup as a child, Lovina has discovered that Leo has been hiding in a nearby monastery ever since. Despite the danger posed to him by the holy ground, Strahd enters the monastery in search of Leo, who lures him into a trap and almost kills him, having learned magic of his own in the intervening decades. Nevertheless, Strahd manages to outsmart him and walls up his corpse in the Wachter family crypt, where Leo soon rises as a vampire himself. To the delight of a vengeful Lady Lovina, he then dies a slow and agonizing second death, unable to satiate his hunger for the blood of the living.

Two years later, Strahd visits Lazlo Ulrich, the burgomaster of Berez, and meets his adopted daughter Marina, who is a spitting image of Tatyana and has no memories of her life before coming to Berez. Strahd quickly seduces her and begins visiting her every night to drink her blood, slowly turning her into a vampire equal to himself. However, Lazlo grows suspicious and kills Marina just before she can rise as undead, and is killed by Strahd in turn. Before he can recover Marina's body, however, it disappears, taken away by the magical mists. Over the next three centuries, Strahd encounters many women who look just like Tatyana and who inevitably die soon after meeting him, regardless of what he does. The memoir ends with Strahd growing weary of this curse and contemplating a prolonged slumber. Having found the information he sought, van Richten quickly flees the castle. Strahd, fully awake, lets him leave, then sits down to continue writing.

== Characters ==
- Strahd von Zarovich – the vampire Count of Barovia, described by van Richten as a "genius, necromancer, ruthless killer". Driven by his fear of aging and mortality and by his jealousy of his younger brother Sergei and his love, Strahd commits fratricide to achieve immortality, only to be denied his heart's true desire, Tatyana's love. After becoming a vampire, he often travels his lands in the guise of Lord Vasili von Holtz, combining his great-grandfather's given name with the middle name of the latter's wife.
- Alek Gwilym – Strahd's "only true friend", second-in-command during his campaigns, and later the steward of Castle Ravenloft until his death at Strahd's hands. Before entering Strahd's service 15 years prior, Gwilym was a foreign mercenary.
- Ilona Darovnya – a High Priestess of an unnamed faith, attached to Strahd's army to heal his soldiers with divine magic. Even after his transformation, Strahd holds her in highest regard, restraining himself from leaving Ravenloft until her death from natural causes.
- Leo Dilisnya – an illegitimate son of a noble family, who leads a coup to overthrow Strahd and the Zarovich family, aiming to take over as Barovia's overlord. He is also a member of the Ba'al Verzi order of assassins and learns to use magic after his coup fails.
- Sergei von Zarovich – Strahd's youngest brother, who was to be ordained as a priest of Lady Ilona's faith before he fell in love with Tatyana.
- Tatyana – a beautiful peasant girl who falls in love with Sergei and who is, in turn, loved by both him and by Strahd.
- Lovina Wachter – a noble loyal to Strahd, who, as a young girl, lost most of her family during Leo's failed coup. Strahd meets her again as a middle-aged matriarch of the Wachter family seeking revenge on Leo.
- Marina – a mysterious young woman who looks exactly like Tatyana. She appears in Berez half a century after Tatyana's disappearance without any memory of herself.
- Lazlo Ulrich – the burgomaster of Berez and Marina's adoptive father who wants to marry her.
- Grigor – a priest of Lady Ilona's faith, in charge of Berez's church, who helps Lazlo to ward off Strahd.
- Rudolph van Richten – a middle-aged herbalist-turned-monster hunter from Mordentshire who discovers Strahd's memoir.

== Reception ==
A reviewer from Publishers Weekly called the book "a chilling, dark fantasy" and comments: "While this volume follows Vampire of the Mists (by Christie Golden) and Knight of the Black Rose (by James Lowder), the narrative's events seem to pre-date those of Golden's story. Although certain events and characters are depicted differently in all three novels, this is not a failing, necessarily, if readers keep in mind that this book is part of TSR's Dungeons & Dragons gaming world, in which each session at the gameboard produces varying scenarios. Elrod's strong prose and excellent pacing are not diminished by being confined to the boundaries of a pre-established universe. Though this novel lacks the baroque sensuality of Anne Rice's Interview with the Vampire or the streetwise humor of the author's own The Vampire Files, it is an exciting and original vampire tale."

Gideon Kibblewhite reviewed I, Strahd: The Memoirs of a Vampire for Arcane magazine, rating it an 8 out of 10 overall. He comments: "Brooding and eerie, punctuated by dreamlike bursts of violence, I Strahd is a full-bodied tale of unrequited love and insanity." He stated that "The story, at first simmering with menace, boils over into a surreal blood-bath as we follow him into the shadows." Kibblewhite continues: "The memoirs of a vampire... it's not a new idea, but this one is done so well. It allows us to fly with him and the bats, to run with the wolves, and to sleep in the tomb. Obviously at home with her subject, Elrod describes, with an uncanny touch for time and place, the ecstasy and horror of an eternal half-life." He adds: "And in Strahd she has created a compelling figure. Intimately painted are his dusty sense of humour, his remote sense of honour, and his castle. He is as poisonous as the fog bordering his lands." Kibblewhite concludes his review by considering the novel "Beautifully written, dark, and tragic; and thoroughly recommended to vampire hunters everywhere."

I, Strahd appeared on the 2024 Game Rant "31 Best Dungeons & Dragons Novels, Ranked" list at #6.

== Reviews ==
- Review by Don D'Ammassa (1993) in Science Fiction Chronicle, #165 August 1993
- Review by Scott Winnett (1993) in Locus, #393 October 1993
- Backstab #6

== See also ==
- List of Ravenloft publications
