= Angel City Press =

Los Angeles publisher

- Parent company: Los Angeles Public Library
- Founded: 1992; 34 years ago
- Founder: Scott McAuley and Paddy Calistro
- Country of origin: United States
- Headquarters location: Los Angeles
- Distribution: Simon & Schuster
- Publication types: Terri Accomazzo
- Official website: acp.lapl.org

Angel City Press at Los Angeles Public Library was co-founded in 1992 by Scott McAuley and Paddy Calistro as a small Los Angeles–based publisher of richly illustrated nonfiction books focused on the culture, history, and architecture of Southern California. Their inaugural publication, Hollywood du Jour, documented legendary Hollywood restaurants through recipes and stories. Over the years ACP published more than 135 titles with more than 100 Southern California authors. In December 2023, the founders donated the press to the Los Angeles Public Library under City Librarian John Szabo so that its mission of telling Los Angeles stories would continue under the library's stewardship. The press is now run by Editorial Director Terri Accomazzo.

== Selected titles ==
- Elements of Los Angeles: Earth, Water, Air, Fire — D.J. Waldie (2025)
- Cruising J‑Town: Japanese American Car Culture in Los Angeles – Oliver Wang (2025)
- Art Deco Los Angeles – Robert Landau & Frans Evenhuis (2025)
- Los Angeles Before the Freeways: Images of an Era 1850‑1950 – Nathan Marsak & Arnold Hylen (2025)
- Bowlarama: The Architecture of Mid‑Century Bowling – Chris Nichols & Adriene Biondo (2024)
- California Eden: Heritage Landscapes of the Golden State – Christine Edstrom O'Hara & Susan Chamberlin (2024)
- Thomas Mann's Los Angeles: Stories from Exile 1940‑1952 – Nikolai Blaumer & Benno Herz (2022)

== Authors ==
Angel City Press has published more than 100 authors, including

- Elizabeth Ai
- Ben Caldwell
- William Deverell
- Arthur Dong
- Josh Kun
- Carribean Fragoza
- Robeson Taj Frazier
- Lynell George
- Naomi Hirahara
- Janna Ireland
- Karla Klarin
- Patt Morrison
- Chris Nichols
- Van Gordon Sauter
- Arnold Schwartzman
- D.J. Waldie
- Oliver Wang

== Awards ==
2023 Winner, California Book Award: Kaos Theory: The Afrokosmic Ark of Ben Caldwell

2024 Winner, California Book Award: Terminal Island: Lost Communities on America's Edge

2025 Winner, Golden Poppy Award, Glenn Goldman California Lifestyle: Cruising J-Town: Japanese American Car Culture in Los Angeles
