= Star Commander =

1983 card game

Star Commander is a 1983 card game published by Historical Concepts.

== Gameplay ==
Star Commander is a game in which players try to be the first to build a fully crewed fleet of starships using cards.

== Reception ==
Scott Haring reviewed Star Commander in Space Gamer No. 70. Haring commented that "Other than the low quality of the components, there's very little bad to say about Star Commander. It's easy to learn and features plenty of player interaction. I and my friends have played it over and over again, and we still enjoy it."

== Reviews ==
- Asimov's Science Fiction v8 n3 (1984 03)
- Isaac Asimov's Science Fiction Magazine
