= Heart of Midnight =

Heart of Midnight may refer to:

- Heart of Midnight (film), 1988 horror film
- Heart of Midnight (novel), 1992 novel by J. Robert King set in the fictional world of Ravenloft
