= Christians and Lions =

Christians and Lions is a 1982 game published by The Omicron Games Company.

== Gameplay ==
Christians and Lions is a game in which two lions attack Christians.

== Reception ==
Scott Haring reviewed Christians and Lions for Fantasy Gamer magazine and stated that "If you can get past the original premise (and let's be honest, anyone who's gleefully dropped 20 megatons on a friend in Nuclear War, offed a roommate in Killer, or cheerfully tortured an orc in an FRPG, it's not that big a leap), you'll have a lot of fun with this game. It won't go down in history as one of the great tactical simulations of our time, but there is tactical skill involved, and actual play is a real hoot. Recommended for anyone with a taste for the bizarre."

Ken Rolston reviewed Christians and Lions in White Wolf #43 (May, 1994) and stated that "There are five scenarios, each with different set-ups and victory conditions. My favorite scenario is 'The Crowd Pleaser,' wherein the Christian player wins if a single Christian - Maimed or otherwise - survives to the last turn."
