= Abyssal Warriors =

Novel by J. Robert King

- Cover
- Author: J. Robert King
- Language: English
- Series: Blood Wars Trilogy
- Genre: Fantasy novel
- Published: June 1996
- Publication place: United States
- Media type: Print
- ISBN: 0-7869-0501-8

Abyssal Warriors is a fantasy novel by J. Robert King, set in the world of Planescape, and based on the Dungeons & Dragons role-playing game. It is the second novel published in the "Blood Wars Trilogy". It was published in June 1996 (ISBN 0-7869-0501-8).

== Plot summary ==
Abyssal Warriors is the second novel in the Blood Wars trilogy after Blood Hostages. In Abyssal Warriors, Aereas and Nina have rescued the kidnapped Artus despite being naive regarding the nature of the Outer Planes, and Aereas must now rescue the body and mind of his young love from the extreme evil underworld of the planes.

== Reception ==
Jonathan Palmer reviewed Abyssal Warriors for Arcane magazine, rating it a 7 out of 10 overall. He commented that "King is better known for his Ravenloft works, but here he proves he can write weirdly enough for Planescape as well." Palmer noted that with Abyssal Warriors and Blood Hostages, "In both books the horror of Planescape is successfully evoked without getting you too bogged down in impossible-to-understand descriptions - the level of explanation is mystical rather than rational." He quipped, "Now, isn't that just typical of a girl to get caught up in a mess like that? It is in many of these books, anyway - but let's not worry about that now." Palmer concluded his review by saying, "As a novel then, this is tosh, as a sourcebook for an imaginative referee, however, it's another book chock-full of all sorts of completely horrid off-the-wall stuff from way out in the leftfield. Give it a go."
