= William W. Connors =

Role-playing game designer

- Occupation: Game designer

William W. Connors is a game designer who has worked primarily on role-playing games.

== Career ==
William W. Connors has worked for a number of companies since the mid-1980s, either on staff or as a freelancer, including TSR, Wizards of the Coast, id Software, and Hasbro. Connors was the guiding force behind the Ravenloft game line. Connors heads up the entertainment division of Senario, LLC, a Chicago-area entertainment and consumer products company.

Connors resides in southeastern Wisconsin with his wife Kathryn and two sons, Chris and Patrick.

== Works ==
His Dungeons & Dragons work has included The Republic of Darokin (1989), Monstrous Compendium Volume One (1989), Monstrous Compendium Volume Two (1989), Monstrous Compendium Forgotten Realms Appendix (1989), Monstrous Compendium Dragonlance Appendix (1990), Monstrous Compendium Greyhawk Appendix (1990), Monstrous Compendium Spelljammer Appendix (1990), Legends & Lore (1990), Greyhawk Ruins (1990), Campaign Sourcebook and Catacomb Guide (1990), The Castle Guide (1990), Monstrous Compendium Ravenloft Appendix (1991), Monstrous Compendium Forgotten Realms Appendix II (1991), Darklords (1991), Dark Sun Boxed Set (1991), The Atruaghin Clans (1991), Van Richten's Guide to Ghosts (1992), Quest for the Silver Sword (1992), Hordes of Dragonspear (1992), Forbidden Lore (1992), Dark Sun Monstrous Compendium Appendix: Terrors of the Desert (1992), Web of Illusion (1993), Monstrous Compendium Ravenloft Appendix II: Children of the Night (1993), Marauders of Nibenay (1993), Book of Artifacts (1993), Wizard's Player's Pack (1994), Thief's Player Pack (1994), Ravenloft Campaign Setting, 2nd Ed. (1994), Priest's Player Pack (1994), Masque of the Red Death and Other Tales (1994), Fighter's Player Pack (1994), Wizards and Rogues of the Realms (1995), The Gothic Earth Gazetteer (1995), Dungeon Master Survival Kit (1995), A Light in the Belfry (1995), Requiem: The Grim Harvest (1996), Dragonlance: Fifth Age (1996), The Shadow Rift (1997), Domains of Dread (1997), Servants of Darkness (1998), The Inner Planes (1998), Champions of the Mists (1998), A Saga Companion (1998), and Children of the Night: The Created (1999).
