= Murder in Cormyr =

1996 novel

- Cover of the first edition
- Language: English
- Genre: Fantasy novel
- Published: 1996
- Publication place: United States
- Media type: Print

Murder in Cormyr is a fantasy novel by Chet Williamson, set in the world of the Forgotten Realms, and based on the Dungeons & Dragons role-playing game. It is the first novel published in the "Mysteries" series. It was published in hardcover in March 1996, ISBN 978-0-7869-0486-0 and in paperback in July 1998, ISBN 978-0-7869-1173-8.

== Plot summary ==
Murder in Cormyr involves a wizard Benelaius and Jasper a half-halfling servant investigating a murder mystery in a village surrounded by a swamp. The book starts with the introduction of Jasper, a village urchin who, due to circumstances, tries to steal from the home of a wizard who recently moved nearby, as part of retirement from the Cormyr war wizard council. Jasper gets caught by Benelaius and as way of repayment, agrees to the proposition of becoming a servant of the wizard for one year. During that time, a mysterious murder takes place with Jasper, under directions of Benelaius, untangling the dark plot.

== Reception ==
Gideon Kibblewhite reviewed Murder in Cormyr for Arcane magazine, rating it a 4 out of 10 overall. He comments that "Murder in Cormyr is certainly better than the other fantasy mystery I've reviewed this month, Murder in Tarsis [...] - although that in itself is not a particularly remarkable achievement. Cormyr's strength is simply that it serves as a reminder that there is a certain amount of mileage to be had out of the fantasy whodunnit, after all." He continues: "The story reads just like an age-old Agatha Christie-style chestnut given the TSR treatment. This time we have Miss Marple in the guise of a rather plump and bearded wizard, her earnest nephew becoming a halfling servant, and the predictably dim-wined detective, the captain of the local militia. The idyllic village (which is filled with all kinds of passionate intrigues, of course) is dumped in the middle of an enormous supernatural swamp. Add a couple of bodies for good measure, and it all sounds extremely promising, doesn't it?" Kibblewhite concludes his review by saying, "Unfortunately, it is not nearly as clever, involved or funny as it might have been. Terry Pratchett did a much better satire of the murder mystery with Feet of Clay [...] and while we can't demand writing of his extremely high calibre in books of this nature, this - like so many other game tie-in efforts - leaves you with the impression of it having been banged out, rather than thought out with any degree of care and attention. Still, at least the butler didn't do it. More tea, vicar?"

== Reviews ==
- Review by uncredited (1997) in The Magazine of Fantasy & Science Fiction, March 1997
