= Time of the Dragon =

1989 Dragonlance role-playing game accessory by David "Zeb" Cook

- Author: David "Zeb" Cook
- Genre: Role-playing game
- Publisher: TSR
- Publication date: 1989
- Media type: Boxed set

Time of the Dragon is an accessory for the Dragonlance campaign setting of the Advanced Dungeons & Dragons fantasy role-playing game.

== Contents ==
Time of the Dragon is an accessory for the Dragonlance campaign setting which details the continent of Taladas of the setting's world of Krynn. Taladas has its own unique cultures and geography, and as it plays no major role in the War of the Lance, Taladas remained relatively untouched by its events. The peoples who inhabit this continent have different views and lifestyles from those of Ansalon, including their relationship with the gods. The dragons of Taladas are also different in their outlook, and are more neutral in outlook due to the role Takhisis, the Queen of Darkness played with Taladas during the War of the Lance. The need to survive has colored the outlooks of the other races of Taladas, making the cultures of Taladas darker in mood than those of Ansalon.

The 112-page "The Guide Book to Taladas" details both the physical geography and politics of Taladas, which includes the societies of the minotaurs and gnomes. After a brief history of the continent, the book discusses Taladas's geography one area at a time, and its impact on its peoples and how they had adapted. During the Cataclysm, one particularly huge meteorite struck the continent, causing volcanoes to erupt, and earthquakes shattered the land; volcanic dust fell over the continent, the seas were poisoned, and land masses shifted, leaving a vast sea of molten lava in the center of Taladas, surrounded by volcanoes. In the northwest part of Taladas are the steppe-dwelling Uigan, who draw their inspiration from the Mongols and Huns of historic Earth. The elves of this area are similar to the Uigan, being nomadic horse warriors. The goblins follow a settled lifestyle, living in small villages and hunting for food, ambushing elven and human horsemen, and making war with the elves. The Marak kender are different from the cute, cheerful ones of Ansalon, changed into a race marked by suspicion and paranoia. The Fianawar dwarves, having been driven from their underground homes by the Cataclysm, have developed a fear of the underground. The League of Minotaurs is the largest power in Taladas, and its society has built in controls to regulate the belief that might makes right. The minoi gnomes love to build devices but lack the logical minds necessary to make them work effectively, while the gnomoi gnomes are far more practical and control gnomish society, taking steps to make sure that it stays stable and develops.

The 48-page "The Rule Book of Taladas" presents rules on how to use character races found in the setting, and statistics for new monsters. This booklet contains game rules specific to Taladas, and makes new player character races available, including the bakali (a race of lizardmen), goblins, minotaurs, and ogres. The book also discusses changes required to make standard character classes fit smoothly into Taladas, and provides player-character kits that summarize the various abilities, skills, proficiencies and backgrounds for 34 common character classes and races. Army organization charts and statistics are included for the Battlesystem supplement. Also included is a selection of monsters that inhabit Taladas.

Two large color maps in the set detail Taladas, while a third map shows the area of the League of the Minotaurs, and a fourth map details the major city of Kristophan. Also included are twenty-four map cards, each having a color illustration on one side and a description of an area on the other side for important locations and diagrams of equipment for characters. The color cards show clothing and armor styles, gnomish devices and a gnome citadel, and areas of the city of Kristophan in more detail.

== Publication history ==
Time of the Dragon was written by David "Zeb" Cook, with a cover by Robin Wood and interior illustrations by Stephen Fabian, Fred Fields, and Ned Dameron, and was published by TSR in 1989 as a boxed set containing a 112-page book, a 48-page book, four large color maps, and 24 cardstock sheets. Editing was by Mike Breault and Jon Pickens, with cartography by Dave Sutherland and David "Diesel" LaForce.

== Reception ==
In the February–March 1990 edition of Games International (Issue 13), Dave Hughes called the background information of Taladas "staggeringly comprehensive," writing that the history presented was "not only interesting and believable, it is also exciting and different enough for you to be thinking of adventure ideas as you read [it]." He did have issues with the nine new monsters, calling them "mostly derivative", and spell lists and rules to be incompatible with recent TSR releases. He concluded by giving this a below-average rating of 6 out of 10, saying, "If you have been looking for a new direction in which to take your players, look at this."

Jim Bambra reviewed Time of the Dragon for Dragon magazine #161 (September 1990). Bambra concluded by saying that "The background of Time of the Dragon is plausible and meticulously presented, with neatly integrated cultures and races. It can easily be used as a campaign setting in its own right, as it not tightly tied to the world of Krynn. Time of the Dragon is well worth looking at and marks a departure from the standard Dragonlance saga setting. It has plenty to recommend it to gamers looking for a harsh and gritty fantasy world."

Lawrence Schick, in his 1991 book Heroic Worlds called the set "A nice package", and commented on the setting: "Taladas's strange and exotic cultures (for example, a society of civilized minotaurs) exhibit an unusual mix (for AD&D) of magic and science."

== Reviews ==
- Casus Belli #56
