= World of Warcraft: Rise of the Horde =

2006 novel by Christie Golden

Rise of the Horde
- First edition cover
- Author: Christie Golden
- Language: English
- Series: Warcraft
- Genre: Fantasy novel
- Publication place: United States
- Media type: Print (Paperback)

World of Warcraft: Rise of the Horde is a novel by Christie Golden set in the Warcraft universe. It was published in December 2006. Golden also has a commitment with Blizzard Entertainment and Simon & Schuster to write a StarCraft trilogy. Originally presumed to be the sequel to her previous 2001 book, Warcraft: Lord of the Clans, it depicts the draenei's escape from Argus and the rise of the Horde, following their shift from a shamanic race to a warmongering one. The book features major Warcraft characters, such as Durotan, Ner'zhul, Gul'dan, Orgrim Doomhammer, Kil'jaeden, and Velen. The story tells of how the orc clans and the noble draenei slowly become enemies due to deception and arrogance, and shows the downward spiral into which the orcs are thrown, and explores the role that demonic forces play in the Horde. It also expands on the origin of the Burning Legion, and the events preceding the first game of the Warcraft series.

The entire novel appears to be told from the viewpoint of Thrall, son of Durotan, and every chapter features a diary entry. Thrall himself was not alive during these events, as he himself is learning them from Drek'Thar, an elder farseer.

The book could be considered a sequel of Lord of the Clans, but an equally strong case could be made for Rise of the Horde being a prequel.

== Plot ==
The novel explores the events in the orc world before the Orcish corruption. The story is set before the events of Warcraft: Orcs & Humans. The novel details the union of the orc clans into a single horde under Gul'dan and Blackhand, the corruption of the orcs and the destruction of the Draenei by the orcish horde.

== Within World of Warcraft ==
In the expansion pack to World of Warcraft, the Burning Crusade, the land of Draenor became available to be explored. Since the events of Rise of the Horde the world has changed greatly, demonic forces have ripped the world apart, however the Draenei temples of Shattrath, and Karabor (what is now the Black Temple), are found within the game. According to the book, they are mere ruins of what they once were. The area of Nagrand is also present, and contains the surviving members of the orc clans, now led by the Mag'har clan, and the surviving Draenei of the massacre.
