= Fighter's Player Pack =

Tabletop role-playing game supplement

- Genre: Role-playing games
- Publisher: TSR

Fighter's Player Pack is an accessory for the 2nd edition of the Advanced Dungeons & Dragons fantasy role-playing game.

== Contents ==
The Fighter's Player Pack is an AD&D game accessory which comes in a case with everything a newcomer needs to get his fighter PC ready for a campaign: a pad of character sheets, a stand-up reference screen, a brief but informative player's guide, seven polyhedral dice, three pewter miniatures, and a shiny red pencil. The case is designed so that a copy of the Player's Handbook can fit snugly inside the lid.

== Publication history ==
Fighter's Player Pack was designed by William W. Connors, and published by TSR, Inc.

== Reception ==
Rick Swan reviewed Fighter's Player Pack for Dragon magazine #214 (February 1995). He commented that: "One of the joys of any hobby is collecting all the junk that goes with it. These AD&D game accessories [...] are a pack rat's dream come true." Swan concludes by saying: "Though recommended for ages 10 to adult, the Player Packs tilt toward the younger end of that scale—I can't imagine a 40-year-old hauling around a plastic briefcase. But if you're trying to lure a reluctant youngster into your campaign, you couldn't ask for better bait."
