= Nightwatch in the Living City =

- Cover art by Robin Wood
- Code: LC3
- Campaign setting: Forgotten Realms
- Authors: Walter Baas, Kira Glass
- First published: 1991

Linked modules
- The Living City

Nightwatch in the Living City is a collection of adventures published by the RPGA in 1991 for their Living City shared campaign world set in the Forgotten Realms using the second edition of the fantasy role-playing game Advanced Dungeons & Dragons.

== Plot summary ==
The player characters have ventured to the city of Raven's Bluff with hopes of finding fame and fortune, and have joined the City Guard in their night-watch patrols as a means to that end. Events and encounters follow a sort of flow chart, with several linked episodes leading to a minor climax, with a major-action climax to end the adventure. Narrative frame and DM-control hooks carry the PCs from scene to scene, but within each scene the players and DM are free to explore a variety of approaches in solving conflicts. All the action in the module takes place in a single night in the setting.

== Publication history ==
RPGA was the tournament division of TSR, and had been quite popular in the early 1980s. By 1987, in the face of decreasing membership as D&D tournaments fell out of fashion, RPGA introduced a "shared" campaign setting called "Living City" that was set in the city of Ravens Bluff and presented at conventions. This resulted in the "Living City" series of supplements and adventures; the third in the series was LC3 Nightwatch in The Living City, a 32-page adventure module based on an adventure that had been designed by Walter Baas and Kira Glass for RPGA tournament play. The adventure was adapted for publication with cover art by Robin Wood, interior art by Kevin Ward and cartography by Valerie Valusek. Nightwatch was published in 1991 by TSR under the RPGA imprint.

== Reception ==
In Issue 171 of Dragon (July 1991), Ken Rolston called Nightwatch "a perfect example of how convention design and playtesting can produce a first-class adventure". Rolston calls the adventure challenges "lovely role-playing set pieces", attributing this to the RPGA Network making "a special effort to encourage the role-playing elements of FRP gaming". Rolston noted that Nightwatch is "all the more remarkable because city role-playing scenarios are notoriously tricky to run. Nightwatch simplifies the DM's task by providing a narrative framework [...] that leads the PCs from one conflict to another so smoothly that they aren't tempted to wander off into the city streets. In particular, the skillful dramatic staging of the PCs' induction to the Nightwatch gets the PCs quickly into character and into the spirit of the adventure." Rolston concluded by saying: "This is an inspiring piece of work, perfect to run as is or to use for stealing ideas. A well-rigged narrative structure is given, yet with ample roleplaying and improvisational opportunities for DM and players. Also present is a host of nifty characters to deal with and plot puzzles to solve, featuring numerous sly and surprising variations on conventional AD&D game cliches. Finally, good fun in abundance. I highly recommend this."

In his 2023 book Monsters, Aliens, and Holes in the Ground, RPG historian Stu Horvath disparaged the cover art of the entire series of Living City books, saying, "The covers are surprisingly second rate for what amounted to a new and exciting way to play D&D." The one exception in Horvath's opinion was Nightwatch: "The best of the lot is Robin Wood's delightfully overjoyed thief, but Nightwatch is the least interesting of the books — more a traditional adventure than an expansion of the Living City concept."
