= Robin Wood (artist) =

American artist (1953–2021)

- Cover of Dragon #97 (May 1985), art by Robin Wood
- Born: November 1953
- Died: April 19, 2021 (aged 67)
- Education: Michigan State University
- Style: Fantasy
- Spouse: Michael Short
- Website: www.robinwood.com

Robin Wood (November 1953 – April 19, 2021) was an American artist specializing in game art and fantasy. She is best known for her portraits of characters from Anne McCaffrey's Dragonriders of Pern series, the Robin Wood Tarot Deck and the cover art for several of Scott Cunningham's books on neo-Paganism.

== Biography ==
Robin Wood was born in November 1953, and graduated from Michigan State University in 1976 with a degree in Special Education for the Visually Impaired. Her interest in fantasy and science fiction art stemmed from a visit to Detroit Triple Fanfair in 1972. After being a "convention artist" for a number of years, she got her first professional commission in 1983 from Mayfair Games to design the character cards for their Dragonriders of Pern board game. In 1984, Robin Wood met Anne McCaffrey at a convention. Wood wrote that, "In 1987, knowing that Anne McCaffrey was going to be at the same con I was, I did a picture of Robinton, hoping that she would buy it. She did, and it grew into a book called People of Pern".

Aside from her Pern artwork, Robin Wood also did book covers for Dragon magazine and Llewellyn Publishing between 1985 and 1993 and designed a Tarot deck. Jeffrey Dohm-Sanchez, for ICv2, reported "Wood was most noted for creating painted covers of Dragon magazine between 1983 and 1993, and portraits of characters from Anne McCaffrey's Dragonriders of Pern series. Wood's game industry credits include multiple TSR D&D covers".

Robin Wood also became heavily involved in content creation within the virtual world of Second Life; she created a texture tutorial and library available within the game, and provided templates and other information on her own website.

== Works ==
=== Books ===
- The People of Pern (with Anne McCaffrey) (1988) ISBN 0-89865-635-4
- The Robin Wood Tarot (1991) ISBN 0-9652984-1-8
- When Why ...If: An Ethics Workbook (1997) ISBN 0-9652984-0-X
- The Robin Wood Tarot: The Book (1998) ISBN 0-87542-894-0
- The Theory of Cat Gravity (with Diana Harlan Stein) (2000) ISBN 0-9652984-2-6
- LightWave 3D 8: 1001 Tips & Tricks (Contributor) (2004) ISBN 1-55622-090-1

=== Roleplaying games ===
- Monsters of Myth & Legend (1984)
- Time of the Dragon (1989)
- The Complete Thief's Handbook (1989)
- Nightwatch in the Living City (1991)
- Van Richten's Guide to Ghosts (1992)
- Treasures of Greyhawk (1992)

== Health issues ==
Her career as an artist was interrupted in 1993 by illness, and in 1995 she was diagnosed with fibromyalgia. This chronic condition forced her to quit doing artwork outside of computer-generated pieces. In early 2005, she was able to push the fibromyalgia into remission and start drawing again.

Wood was diagnosed with cancer in 2019. She provided occasional updates about her condition and her continued treatment on her blog up until January 2021. Her husband Michael Short provided a final update in mid-April 2021 that her condition had declined significantly, and she died on April 19, 2021.
