= Hordes of Dragonspear =

Role-playing game adventure

- Code: FRQ2
- First published: 1992

Hordes of Dragonspear is an adventure for the 2nd edition of the Advanced Dungeons & Dragons fantasy role-playing game, released in 1992. The manual was published by TSR and written by William W. Conners. It uses the Battlesystem ruleset for large scale battles. The cover illustration by Doug Chaffee originally appeared in the AD&D second edition Player's Handbook (1989).

== Publication history ==
The manual was published by TSR and written by William W. Conners.

== Reception ==
John Setzer reviewed the manual in a 1993 issue of White Wolf magazine, suggesting that it was overly ambitious and would lack utility for most Dungeon Masters. He rated it a 2 out of a possible 5.
