= Bleak House: The Death of Rudolph van Richten =

D&D module

- Genre: Role-playing games
- Publisher: TSR
- Publication date: 1996
- Media type: Boxed set

Bleak House: The Death of Rudolph van Richten is an accessory for the 2nd edition of the Advanced Dungeons & Dragons fantasy role-playing game, published in 1996.

== Contents ==
Bleak House: The Death of Rudolph van Richten is a campaign consisting of three adventures for the Ravenloft setting, consisting of "Adventure One, Whom Fortune Would Destroy", "Adventure Two, The Baron", and "Adventure Three, Homecoming". In "Whom Fortune Would Destroy", the player characters are stranded on an isolated desert island and become the guests of a respected psychologist whose treatments at the Asylum seem to be effective while their effects are disturbing. "The Baron" takes place in a city, where the characters pursue leads that they learned about in the madhouse to find out what is happening to Rudolph van Richten. "Homecoming" takes the characters back to the Van Richten family estate Bleak House where they must solve a mystery quickly, try to stay sane, rescue Van Richten and escape. "Homecoming" uses an invisible time-line to keep the action moving, and also employs the Tarokka (Tarot) system and the adventure has four possible endings.

== Publication history ==
Bleak House: The Death of Rudolph van Richten was published by TSR, Inc. in 1996.

== Reception ==
Trenton Webb reviewed Bleak House: The Death of Rudolph van Richten for Arcane magazine, rating it an 8 out of 10 overall. He calls Bleak House "the rip-roaring finale of Ravenloft's most famous do-gooder" where "only the lucky will survive," stating that the adventure campaign "ranks as one of Ravenloft's best ever, bundling together classic horror tales, rewarding roleplaying and the resurrection of some fine game mechanics".

He felt that Bleak House "has a distinct Star Wars feel," saying that "Whom Fortune Would Destroy" is "great" and that "The Baron" is "a necessary but unsatisfying transition" while "Homecoming" offers "the equivalent payoff of a second Death Star assault, Ewok battle, Duel with Darth Vader and then some." Of "Whom Fortune Would Destroy" Webb notes that it "plays the madness card" calling it a "harrowing and invasive scenario" which "pushes close to the bounds of gaming good taste" in that it "doles out vicious mental torture with such wanton disregard for the consequences that less mature players will feel personally slighted and abused." Of "The Baron," he calls it "the weakest of the three scenarios," but sees it as "probably a necessary evil, as veterans of the Asylum will need some time to get their characters' minds and bodies back together, but the change is too sudden." Of "Homecoming" Webb says that it is there "that the horror side of Ravenloft really kicks in, and it's terrifyingly good", adding that as a stand-alone it "would be strong, but as the climax to a three-part scenario it's near perfect. Uniting the themes of the earlier scenarios and drawing on the full Van Richten legend. It hammers home the horror harder than nails in a coffin" and concludes that its "mix of mysteries and combat maintains the Ravenloft balance, while the use of Van Richten gives the whole affair an epic air. It's a tense and spectacular adventure."

Webb commented that the whole Bleak House campaign "is a strong blend of the old and the new. Haunted houses and deserted islands are hardly original Ravenloft concepts, but they're delivered in a confident and coherent style." He noted a few problems with Bleak House: "Van Richten, for instance, seems to have forgotten what he learned from Dr. Illhousen in the Nightmare Lands expansion. The impact of the shipwreck scenario is marred if you've played Neither Man Nor Beast and the manuals suffer from clumsy artwork. But those are points for pedants." Webb concluded the review by saying, "Bleak House is a campaign that will destroy many characters and leave survivors staggering and scarred. Yet those who roam the Demi-Plane of Dread have asked for that, and they've opted to explore the nastier end of gaming and enjoy recreating famous moments of horror. Bleak House delivers this in spades. I just wish I'd never read it - because then I could play it!"
