= The Republic of Darokin =

Tabletop role-playing game supplement for Dungeons & Dragons

- Authors: Scott Haring and William W. Connors
- Genre: Role-playing game
- Publisher: TSR
- Publication date: March 1989

The Republic of Darokin is an accessory for the Dungeons & Dragons fantasy role-playing game. It was written by Scott Haring and William W. Connors, and published by TSR in 1989.

== Contents ==
The Republic of Darokin is a supplement which describes how the fictional Republic of Darokin specializes in land-based guilds, and the accessory covers life, society, and politics in their lands. The gazetteer details a plutocratic republic with a council of merchants in authority. The 32-page "Player's Guide" gives an overview of the country, including rules for player characters and a Merchant character class, and includes trading guidelines and a map of the main trade routes, imports, and exports of the world. The 64-page "Dungeon Master's Guide" includes background material on the history, climate, geography, economy, society, and notable places of the land. The gazetteer also contains rules for to adapt the material to AD&D, as well as a map of the city of Darokin, another large color map, and cardstock miniatures of the wagons that merchants use.

== Publication history ==
The Republic of Darokin (GAZ11) was written by Scott Haring and William W. Connors, with a cover by Clyde Caldwell and interior illustrations by Stephen Fabian, and was published by TSR in 1989. It comprises a 64-page "Dungeon Master's Guide", a 32-page "Player's Guide", two cardstock sheets, a large color map, and an outer folder.

== Reception ==
Jim Bambra briefly reviewed The Republic of Darokin for Dragon magazine #151 (November 1989). Bambra wrote that the books "bring trading adventures into the forefront of fantasy gaming", and that with rules regarding trading, "fame and fortune can now be gained in ways other than mere adventuring".
