= Masque of the Red Death and Other Tales =

1994 role-playing game supplement

- Cover art by Robh Ruppel
- Author: William W. Connors
- Genre: Horror role-playing game
- Publisher: TSR
- Publication date: 1994

Masque of the Red Death and Other Tales, subtitled "Terror in the 1890s", was published by TSR in 1994 as an alternate campaign setting for the horror fantasy role-playing game Ravenloft, which itself uses the rules from the 2nd edition of Advanced Dungeons & Dragons.

== Description ==
Masque of the Red Death, which takes its name from the short story by Edgar Allan Poe, is set on an alternate history Earth in the 1890s in a setting called "Gothic Earth."

Red Death refers to a malevolent entity spawned in ancient Egypt during the "golden age of magic." It has slowly gained power through the centuries, promoting violence and catalyzing disasters using the undead and the insane. By the late 19th century, Gothic Earth is tottering on the edge of the abyss. The characters, as members of the secret society called "Enlightened Age", fight avatars of the Red Death

=== Setting ===
Masque of the Red Death is set on Earth in the 1890s in a setting called "Gothic Earth." There is a strong connection to the supernatural as well as characters mentioned in legends and literature. For example, necromancers practice dark arts among the slave traders of New Orleans, while spirit creatures stalk the settlers of the American West, and Sherlock Holmes shares a railroad car with Count Dracula.

Although the game uses rules similar to the previously published Ravenloft, this is a completely new setting, with no carry-over in characters or storylines from the original setting. Also, unlike the basic Ravenloft setting, where mysterious mists divide the realm into distinct settings, the Gothic Earth setting has no divisions.

=== Character classes ===
Since sword-bearing warriors and robed wizards would be out of place in Gothic Earth, the usual character classes of AD&D (fighter, wizard, cleric, thief) have been modified to soldier, merchant, adept and mystic, with several subclasses for each such as athlete, detective and explorer.

Players can also select character kits from a list of vocations such as Cavalryman, Journalist, and Laborer. Nonweapon proficiencies, optional in the standard AD&D game, are required here; among the choices are Chemistry, Photography, and Criminology.

=== Components ===
The boxed set includes

- "A Guide to Gothic Earth", a 132-page book that gives a history of Gothic Earth, the evil that is uprising, character creation, skills, money & equipment, magic, combat, and an atlas. The rule book ends with a chapter of referee tips, covering rule modifications from the original Ravenloft setting.
- Three 32-page adventure modules: "Red Jack", set in Boston as the characters investigate a serial killer; "Red Death" involves a haunted mansion; and "Red Tide", set in San Francisco and involving Count Dracula.
- A gamemaster's screen.
- A map of Gothic Earth.

== Publication history ==
TSR published the horror campaign setting Ravenloft in 1983 that combined traditional AD&D with a horror vampire-centered setting. In 1994, TSR released an alternative Ravenloft setting, Masque of the Red Death and Other Tales, a boxed set designed by William W. Connors, with contributions by DJ Heinrich, Shane Lacy Hensley, and Colin Moulder-McComb, cover art by Robh Ruppel, interior art by Stephen Fabian and Ned Dameron, and cartography by David Sutherland III.

TSR subsequently released two supplements, The Gothic Earth Gazetteer (1995), and A Guide to Transylvania (1996).

In 2004, White Wolf Games released a d20 System version of the setting in hardback under the Sword and Sorcery imprint.

== Reception ==
In Issue 21 of Australian Realms, Colin Taber commented that the boxed set was "packed with high quality bits and pieces." Taber also felt the three adventure modules were "good value and a great starting point for a Red Death Ravenloft campaign." However Taber did point out the map of Gothic Earth included "the Commonwealth of Australia, a nation which didn't yet exist." Taber concluded that this game had revived his interest in the Ravenloft setting, and suggested, "For those interested in this genre, give it a good look over."

In the April 1995 issue of Realms of Fantasy, Mark Sumner felt that Masque of the Red Death fixed what he thought was the problem of the original Ravenloft game, "the poor fit between TSR's traditional sword-swinging dungeon crawling AD&D universe and the very Victorian horror elements of Ravenloft ... this is what Ravenloft should have been in the first place." Sumner was enthused about this game, saying, "Finally, finally, I can send a character out with a cross in one pocket and a revolver in another ... this is the gaming experience I had been hoping to find ever since horror RPGs started landing on the shelves." Sumner concluded, "It takes [Ravenloft] from near the bottom of my Favorite Game World list to right up to the top."

In Issue 86 of the French games magazine Casus Belli, Fabrice Colin commented on the risk of modifying a favorite setting like Ravenloft, saying, "With an impressive number of modifications, additions and corrections, the authors took the plunge and offered us a product that was ultimately honest. However, fans of Bram Stoker, Robert Louis Stevenson or Arthur Conan Doyle risk being disappointed: the literate prose does not succeed in masking a truly Manichean and yet confusingly banal background." Ultimately, Colin was torn in two directions, writing, "Certainly, we have here a universe sufficiently created and documented to allow long hours of play, three good scenarios ... plus a very beautiful map and a screen, all for a very reasonable price. But we can also see TSR's attempt to pass off AD&D as a universal system suitable for all eras, when that is not the case." Colin concluded, "Those who detest [AD&D] can easily turn to other products (Cthulhu by Gaslight or Castle Falkenstein) to taste the delights of the Victorian era. Others can try this experience: it will certainly differ from the Forgotten Realms."

Rick Swan reviewed Masque of the Red Death in Dragon Magazine #216 (April 1995), giving it a "The best" rating. "Masque of the Red Death is cause for celebration," he wrote, "especially for players whose AD&D game campaigns have gone stale. Not exactly the Ravenloft setting and not exactly a new game, [it] is the most provocative AD&D variant since the Spelljammer campaign." He concluded, "Masque of the Red Death makes a persuasive case for reality-based role-playing, where wits count more than muscle and a shotgun packs more punch than a fireball.… [N]itpickers who've been clamoring for a streamlined, skill-based AD&D game ought to be dancing in the streets."

== Other reviews ==
- Rollespilsmagasinet Fønix (Danish) (Issue 7 - March/April 1995)
