= Children of the Night: Vampires =

Role-playing game supplement

- Cover
- Genre: Role-playing games
- Publisher: TSR
- Publication date: 1996

Children of the Night: Vampires is an accessory for the 2nd edition of the Advanced Dungeons & Dragons fantasy role-playing game, published in 1996.

== Contents ==
Vampires, the first supplement released for the Children of the Night series, introduced 13 vampire characters intended for use in Ravenloft, each one detailed with appearance, game statistics, background information, notes on personality and combat abilities, as well as a short adventure or encounter intended to display the eccentricities, strengths and weaknesses of each vampire.

== Publication history ==
Children of the Night: Vampires was published by TSR, Inc. in 1996.

== Reception ==
Trenton Webb reviewed Children of the Night: Vampires for Arcane magazine, rating it a 5 out of 10 overall. He stated that "Vampires are skill, it's been proved! Since Bram's book and the first Nosferatu movie these creatures of the night have been the ultimate undead. In the mist-shrouded horror-world of Ravenloft vampires, under the guidance of Strahd, have even become a dominant power in the land." Webb noted that the book "creates a host of bloodsuckers primarily for use in Ravenloft, but that will also function just fine in most other AD&D realms. Well, that's the aim - 13 ready-rolled princes (and princesses) of darkness who can drain your party at a moment's notice" and that "Each of this Bloodsucker's dozen is dutifully detailed to death." He added: "Yet for all the effort lavished on these monsters, their wildly different powers and complex personal histories, the devil doesn't dwell in the detail. Somehow they fail to spark the imagination quite the way they should. Some of the creations work, but the majority feel little more than premeditated twists on the 'standard' vampire types. And in the mould of Interview with the Vampire, too many are whinging vampire apologists who are suffering 'an unbearable curse', and who after each and every feeding 'wail loudly'." Webb concluded his review by saying, "The fearful Lady Adeline and darkly comic Jack Bequick are finely developed vampiric characters, but too many of the Children of the Night lack bite. Within a Ravenloft setting there will be enough other horror cues, and players will be sufficiently used to dealing with 'different' vampires to run with the ball. But outsiders - who are used to caped counts with pointy teeth - may have some trouble."

Alex Lucard, for Diehard GameFAN, reviewed the PDF edition released on DNDClassics in 2013 and wrote, "I enjoyed eight of the thirteen vampires and nine of the thirteen adventures. [...] That means roughly two-third of the book is good, which is far better than one would have expected, considering the infamous reputation this title has. [...] The PDF is a bit pricey (ten dollars compared to the fifteen dollar price tag the book had when it was in print), but it’s still one old school Ravenloft fans might want to pick up and see what they missed all those years ago". Lucard also highlighted "that, as far as Ravenloft products go, Children of the Night: Vampires is the most infamous and often subjected to a lot of scorn. Why is that, you might ask? Two words: Jander Sunstar. [...] This adventure collection brought Jander Sunstar back to life, via the dues ex machina of the Ravenloft Mists. That alone brought outrage from Ravenloft fans across the board. The icing on the cake, however, was that everything about the stat block was messed up. Not only did it not match the official stats released in the 1992 trading card set (which were, in and of themselves, subject for contentious debate), but what was presented as Jander Sunstar in no way shape or form matched the character from the novel".
