= World of Warcraft: Arthas: Rise of the Lich King =

2009 novel by Christie Golden

Arthas: Rise of the Lich King
- Author: Christie Golden
- Cover artist: Glenn Rane
- Language: English
- Series: Warcraft
- Genre: Fantasy novel
- Publisher: Pocket Books
- Publication date: April 21, 2009
- Publication place: United States
- Media type: Print (hardcover)
- Pages: 312 pp
- ISBN: 1-4165-5077-1
- Preceded by: Night of the Dragon
- Followed by: The Shattering: Prelude to Cataclysm

Arthas: Rise of the Lich King is a Warcraft novel by Christie Golden, who is the author of multiple Star Trek and other Warcraft novels. The novel dealing with the progression of Arthas from Prince to the Lich King, was released on April 21, 2009.

== Plot ==
The book is set over an extended period, and has many duplicate scenes from other works, including Tides of Darkness, Beyond the Dark Portal, Day of the Dragon, Reign of Chaos, The Frozen Throne and Wrath of the Lich King. However, while the scenes themselves remain the same, they are experienced from alternate viewpoints.

The story starts off with Arthas at age nine, in the period between the First and Second Wars, with Anduin Lothar and Varian Wrynn first arriving in Capital City bearing news of the fall of Stormwind. Arthas and Varian play together, though while Varian was trained to fight since childhood, Arthas was shielded from such teachings by his father. However, with Muradin Bronzebeard coming across Arthas fighting imaginary orcs while Alliance forces battle against the Horde on Draenor, Muradin volunteers to train him. Later, Arthas is caught up in Daval Prestor's attempt to marry Calia Menethil.

The love triangle between Arthas, Jaina Proudmoore and Kael'thas Sunstrider is developed through the plot, Arthas and Jaina partaking in the festivities of Noblegarden, the Midsummer Fire Festival, Hallow's End and the Feast of Winter Veil together. Later, as Arthas starts taking on the responsibilities of a prince, he visits Durnholde Keep, seeing Thrall fight other adversaries in the gladiator arena. Quel'Thalas is visited and high elven culture depicted. Eventually, he is inducted as a Knight of the Silver Hand in the Cathedral of Light.

Eventually, the Third War begins. The story covers Arthas and Jaina meeting Kel'Thuzad, Arthas calling Uther a traitor and dismissing him and the Knights of the Silver Hand from service for their refusal to aid in the Culling of Stratholme. In time, Arthas' search for vengeance leads him to Frostmourne, the (apparent) demise of Mal'Ganis and the moments leading to and after the murder of King Terenas.

The storyline continues beyond this point, to Jaina and Aegwynn in Theramore. Numerous scenes from Wrath of the Lich King are included along with cameos of Tuskarr and Taunka races.

== Reception ==
Arthas reached 16 on the New York Times Best Seller list on May 10, 2009.

== See also ==
- List of novels based on video games
