= Summerhill Hounds =

Summerhill Hounds is a novel by Robert King published by TSR in 1995.

== Plot summary ==
Summerhill Hounds is a novel in the First Quest series intended for younger readers, an adventure story regarding a pack of hounds which live in a large fortress.

== Reception ==
Gideon Kibblewhite reviewed Summerhill Hounds for Arcane magazine, rating it a 3 out of 10 overall. Kibblewhite comments that "Alas, this shaggy tale is not nearly amazing, frightening or funny enough to entertain the average youngster. This is cuddly but pale pup fiction that falls short of the standards set by both classic and modern children's fantasy."

== Reviews ==
- Review by Fred Patten (1996) in Yarf! The Journal of Applied Anthropomorphics #42
