= Van Richten's Guide to Ghosts =

1992 role-playing game accessory

- Genre: Role-playing games
- Publisher: TSR
- Publication date: 1992

Van Richten's Guide to Ghosts is an accessory for the 2nd edition of the Advanced Dungeons & Dragons fantasy role-playing game, published in 1992.

== Contents ==
The book sorts ghosts into several general categories according to their power levels (first through fifth magnitude), physical appearance (spectral, humanoid, bestial), and origin (sudden death, reincarnation, dark pacts). By mixing the characteristics associated with these and other categories, the Dungeon Master can create customized spirits. Ghostly powers and vulnerabilities are discussed at length, and a chapter is devoted to the investigation of hauntings.

== Publication history ==
Van Richten’s Guide to Ghosts was written by William W. Connors, and published by TSR, Inc. Cover art was by Robin Wood, with interior art by Robert Klasnich and Stephen Fabian.

== Reception ==
Rick Swan reviewed Van Richten's Guide to Ghosts for Dragon magazine #186 (October 1992). Swan comments: "One of the better Ravenloft supplements, this volume provides workable suggestions for incorporating the incorporeal into gothic horror campaigns." He felt that the chapter devoted to the investigation of hauntings "provides interesting springboards for supernatural adventures". Swan concluded that although the book was "generally well-written, the designer should've ditched the first-person approach [...] which is not only distracting but inappropriate for what is essentially a rule book".

Gene Alloway reviewed the module in a 1993 issue of White Wolf Magazine. He rated it a 4 out of a possible 5. He stated, "Without question this is a must-buy for the Ravenloft gamer."

== Reviews ==
- Envoyer #5
