= Van Richten's Guide to the Created =

Role-playing game accessory

- Genre: Role-playing games
- Publisher: TSR

Van Richten's Guide to the Created is an accessory for the 2nd edition of the Advanced Dungeons & Dragons fantasy role-playing game.

== Contents ==
Van Richten's Guide to the Created discusses the manufacture of golems in detail, touching on material procurement, mental development, and brain transplants. A section on "Body Parts and Decay" tells how long it takes a corpse to rot under various climatic conditions; for example, a brain kept indoors should stay fresh for a couple of days. The "Nutritional Requirement" rules advise that a thoughtful master should feed his golem a suckling pig at least once a week.

== Publication history ==
Van Richten's Guide to the Created was written by Teeuwynn Woodruff, and published by TSR, Inc.

== Reception ==
Rick Swan reviewed Van Richten's Guide to the Created for Dragon magazine #207 (July 1994). He reviewed this book with the adventure Adam's Wrath, and commented that the "AD&D game meets Frankenstein in these first-rate supplements for the Ravenloft setting." He commented on the "lurid detail" on golem creation: "What makes this the most memorable entry in the Van Richten's line is Woodruff's gleeful commentary about the, er, visceral consequences."
