= Carnival of Fear =

1993 novel by J. Robert King

- Cover of the first edition
- Author: J. Robert King
- Language: English
- Genre: Fantasy novel
- Publication date: 1993
- Publication place: United States
- Media type: Print
- Preceded by: Tapestry of Dark Souls
- Followed by: I, Strahd: The Memoirs of a Vampire

Carnival of Fear is a 1993 fantasy horror novel by J. Robert King, set in the world of Ravenloft, and based on the Dungeons & Dragons game.

== Plot summary ==
Carnival of Fear is a novel in which the apparent murder of a dwarf who worked for a carnival that has run for centuries in the realm of l'Morai run by the Puppetmaster, leads to a trial to find the killer.

== Reception ==
A reviewer from Publishers Weekly comments that King "offers a simple but effective message about the evils of scapegoating in his fantasy-horror tale [...] King's careful progress from a basic murder to a much larger mystery, which ultimately encompasses the entire carnival, gives the book the momentum needed to keep the pages turning."

== Reviews ==
- Kliatt
