= Scholar of Decay =

Fantasy horror novel by Tanya Huff

- Author: Tanya Huff
- Language: English
- Series: Ravenloft series
- Genre: Fantasy novel
- Published: 1995 (TSR, Inc.)
- Publication place: United States
- Media type: Print (Paperback)
- Pages: 313 pp (first edition, paperback)
- ISBN: 978-0786902064 (first edition, paperback)
- Preceded by: Death of a Darklord
- Followed by: King of the Dead

Scholar of Decay is a fantasy horror novel by Tanya Huff, set in the world of Ravenloft, and based on the Dungeons & Dragons game.

== Plot summary ==
Scholar of Decay is a novel in which Aurek Nuiken searches for a book of spells in the city of Richemulot, in order to save his wife.

== Reviews ==
- Kliatt
- Review by Michelle West (1996) in The Magazine of Fantasy & Science Fiction, September 1996
