= Heart of Midnight (novel) =

Fantasy horror novel by J. Robert King

- Cover of the first edition
- Author: J. Robert King
- Language: English
- Series: Ravenloft series
- Genre: Fantasy novel
- Published: January 1992 (TSR, Inc.)
- Publication place: United States
- Media type: Print (Paperback)
- Pages: 313 pp (first edition, paperback)
- ISBN: 1560761563 (first edition, paperback)
- Preceded by: Dance of the Dead
- Followed by: Tapestry of Dark Souls

Heart of Midnight is a fantasy horror novel by J. Robert King, set in the world of Ravenloft, and based on the Dungeons & Dragons game.

== Plot summary ==
Heart of Midnight is a novel in which Casimir seeks revenge on the meistersinger of Harmonia who was responsible for the death of Casimir's mother.

== Reviews ==
- Kliatt
- Review by Baird Searles (1993) in Asimov's Science Fiction, June 1993
