= A Saga Companion =

1988 Dragonlance: Fifth Age supplement

A Saga Companion is a 1998 role-playing game supplement published by TSR for Dragonlance: Fifth Age.

== Contents ==
A Saga Companion is a supplement in which new background systems, streamlined magic, creation guidelines for races, roles, and monsters, and a suite of optional tools are included.

== Reviews ==
- Backstab #10
- Realms of Fantasy
