= Forbidden Lore =

Tabletop role-playing game supplement

- Author: Bruce Nesmith and William W. Connors
- Genre: Role-playing games
- Publisher: TSR
- Publication date: 1992
- Media type: Boxed set

Forbidden Lore is an accessory for the 2nd edition of the Advanced Dungeons & Dragons fantasy role-playing game, published in 1992 by TSR.

== Contents ==
The supplement comprises five sections covering Ravenloft lore: lore: "secret societies, magic, the Tarokka, curses and powers, and psionics". It includes a set of Dikesha dice and a deck of Tarroka cards—similar to Tarot. A poster-sized foldout provides floor plans for various buildings. The product provides additional information for the Ravenloft setting, including "new spells, curses, secret societies, items, and psionic rules for campaigns visiting or running in Ravenloft". It also outlines the Tarokka in a manner that reviewer Gene Alloway praised.

== Publication history ==
The product was published by TSR and written by Bruce Nesmith and William W. Connors. It is part of the AD&D Ravenloft series.

== Reception ==
Gene Alloway reviewed the manual in a 1993 issue of White Wolf. He provided a positive review, stating that "a must for any Ravenloft adventurer or DM. I would also recommend it as a good source for other Gothic horror campaigns". Alloway noted that it was consequential in expanding the setting. He rated it overall at a 4 out of 5 possible points.

DieHard GameFan said that "To be honest, unless you are a Ravenloft completionist like myself, this isn't a 'must have' set by any means. Nova Arcanum is the only one DMs across the board will make use out of. Everything else is pretty niche and will only appeal to a slice of Ravenloft gamers, and even less will actually make use of them."
