= Dance of the Dead (novel) =

1992 novel by Christie Golden

- Author: Christie Golden
- Language: English
- Series: Ravenloft series
- Genre: Fantasy novel
- Published: 1992 (TSR, Inc.)
- Publication place: United States
- Media type: Print (paperback)
- Preceded by: Knight of the Black Rose
- Followed by: Heart of Midnight

Dance of the Dead is a 1992 fantasy horror novel by Christie Golden. Set in the world of Ravenloft, it is based on the Dungeons & Dragons game.

== Plot summary ==
The story follows the adventures of Larisa Snowmane, a dancer who travels across the land of Ravenloft by ship. The captain of the ship has evil intentions, however, and the ship comes to land at an island full of zombies. Larisa, along with some of the living inhabitants of the island, must perform a magical dance called the Dance of the Dead to save herself from the captain.

== Reception ==
Amos C. Patterson of Kliatt praised the book's story and character development, saying the novel would keep readers interested until the end.
