= A Guide to Transylvania =

Tabletop role-playing game supplement

- Genre: Role-playing games
- Publisher: TSR
- Publication date: 1996

A Guide to Transylvania is an accessory for the 2nd edition of the Advanced Dungeons & Dragons fantasy role-playing game, published in 1996.

== Contents ==
A Guide to Transylvania is a campaign supplement which focuses on the Dracula story, and while the Count is away at Carfax Abbey both the soldiers of good and a series rival evil cults have taken advantage of the situation to seek power, and the Red Death had formed this state to fulfil their own ends.

== Publication history ==
A Guide to Transylvania was published by TSR, Inc. in 1996.

== Reception ==
Trenton Webb reviewed A Guide to Transylvania for Arcane magazine, rating it a 9 out of 10 overall. He commented: "Transylvania has been synonymous with evil and superstition ever since Bram Stoker penned Dracula. Now Stoker's vision of this feudal, blood-soaked land has been resurrected, fleshed out and given a horde of new skeletons to keep in its dusty cupboards." Webb stated: "Those not familiar with Masque of the Red Death may find the very concept of an AD&D game set in the 1890s a little hard to comprehend. Yet with surprisingly few tweaks and this correct setting the system works, and what's more makes for a rivetting change from more usual, slightly predictable Tolkienesque adventures." He added "Written in a brisk manner, reminiscent of a Victorian Grand Tour, this guide gives referees a fascinating insight into the very heart of Transylvania mixing up history, legend, superstition and 1890s fact to create a world so believable you can almost smell the garlic." Webb concluded his review by stating that "Transylvania offers no example adventure, however if the Forbidden Lore and legends don't start you thinking then you're running the wrong game. The only weakness of Transylvania is that as a sub-set of Ravenloft which in itself is a sub-set of more traditional D&D, then its useful appeal is limited. However, if ever proof was needed that D&D isn't just a game about Orc bashing, then this is definitely it."
