= Blood Hostages =

1996 novel by J. Robert King

- Cover
- Author: J. Robert King
- Language: English
- Series: Blood Wars Trilogy
- Genre: Fantasy novel
- Published: January 1996
- Publication place: United States
- Media type: Print
- ISBN: 0-7869-0473-9

Blood Hostages is a fantasy novel by J. Robert King, set in the Planescape campaign setting, and based on the Dungeons & Dragons role-playing game. It is the first novel published in the "Blood Wars Trilogy". It was published in paperback, January 1996.

== Plot summary ==
Blood Hostages is a novel in which an uncle is kidnapped which reveals the dark past that he tried to hide, while his teenage rescuers discover that they have royal parentage.

== Reception ==
Trenton Webb reviewed Blood Hostages for Arcane magazine, rating it a 5 out of 10 overall. He commented that "This book may be formulaic fantasy but it's fun. Perverse enjoyment comes from the ceaseless parade of fantasy fiction conventions, while genuine pleasure comes from the headlong charge through the bizarre Planescape multiverse." Webb commented that the novel "shamelessly employs every fantasy cliché", but concluded his review by saying "Despite this, it's a tolerable read. The flat characters are rescued by the energy, variety and weirdness of the planes. No attempt is made to explain how each world works: the characters only see how that plane affects their skills, echoing the style of the Planescape manuals. Experienced Planescape players will warm to Blood Hostages as their game world is brought, somewhat functionally, to life. It's a useful source of planar descriptions, an example of how they can be played and an excellent introduction for those who wish to explore them. Just don't turn to it for plot inspiration."
