= Death of a Darklord =

Novel by Laurell K. Hamilton

- Author: Laurell K. Hamilton
- Language: English
- Series: Ravenloft series
- Genre: Fantasy novel
- Publication date: 1995
- Publication place: United States
- Media type: Print (Paperback)
- Pages: 320 pp (first edition, paperback)
- ISBN: 978-0786941223
- Preceded by: Baroness of Blood
- Followed by: Scholar of Decay

Death of a Darklord is a fantasy novel by Laurell K. Hamilton, set in the world of Ravenloft, and based on the Dungeons & Dragons game.

== Plot summary ==
Death of a Darklord is a novel in which the dead in the village of Cortton are being raised to terrorize the living, and a mage is hired to stop them.

== Reviews ==
- Science Fiction Chronicle
- Backstab #8 (as "Mort d'un sombre seigneur")
