= The Gothic Earth Gazetteer =

1995 role-playing game accessory

- Genre: Role-playing games
- Publisher: TSR
- Publication date: 1995

The Gothic Earth Gazetteer is an accessory for the 2nd edition of the Advanced Dungeons & Dragons fantasy role-playing game, published in 1995.

== Contents ==
The Gothic Earth Gazetteer is a supplement for Masque of the Red Death players which presents background and ideas for adventures, as well as a timeline of the setting from 1890-1899, and details on important events, people, and qabals. Following the timeline the book details the events such as the Spanish–American War, the Dreyfus Affair and the Wounded Knee Massacre, along with supernatural events that accompanied the historical depictions. The biographical section likewise describes notable historical people with fictional enhancements such as artist Paul Cézanne, and includes some fictional characters such as Sherlock Holmes. The supplement ends with accounts of some of the important qabals. The accessory is bound with a color poster consisting of a calendar for the era.

== Publication history ==
The Gothic Earth Gazetteer was designed by William W. Connors, and published by TSR in 1995. The cover artist was Robh Ruppel, with interior art courtesy of and used with permission of Dover Publications, Inc.

== Reception ==
Cliff Ramshaw reviewed The Gothic Earth Gazetteer for Arcane magazine, rating it a 5 out of 10 overall. Ramshaw called the accessory "something very much like a history book, but with make-believe bits thrown in for good measure". He commented that the timeline "makes for interesting reading and is, dare I say it, educational, despite its peculiar emphasis on American baseball achievements". He felt that the Spanish–American War description would give referees plenty of ideas for espionage adventures, despite no overt hints given. He considered the accounts of the significant qabals "lacklustre". Ramshaw concluded by saying: "The Gazetteer is nicely presented and quite intriguing, but you're likely to unearth much more in the way of atmosphere and ideas by reading a few history books and period novels."
