= Tapestry of Dark Souls =

1993 novel by Elaine Bergstrom

- Cover of the first edition
- Author: Elaine Bergstrom
- Language: English
- Genre: Fantasy novel
- Publisher: Wizards of the Coast/TSR, Inc.
- Publication date: March 1993
- Publication place: United States
- Media type: Print (Paperback)
- Pages: 310
- ISBN: 978-1560765714
- Preceded by: Heart of Midnight
- Followed by: Carnival of Fear

Tapestry of Dark Souls is a fantasy horror novel by Elaine Bergstrom, set in the world of Ravenloft, and based on the Dungeons & Dragons game. It was published by TSR, Inc.

== Reception ==
Tapestry of Dark Souls introduced the first lesbian couple in a D&D/TSR world; Bergstrom has a significant gay following.

== Reviews ==
- Kliatt
