= King of the Dead (novel) =

1996 fantasy novel by Gene DeWeese

- Cover
- Author: Gene DeWeese
- Language: English
- Genre: Fantasy novel
- Published: 1996
- Publication place: United States
- Media type: Print
- ISBN: 0-7869-0483-6
- Preceded by: Scholar of Decay
- Followed by: To Sleep with Evil

King of the Dead is a fantasy novel by Gene DeWeese, set in the world of Ravenloft, and is based on the Dungeons & Dragons role-playing game. It was published in March 1996 (ISBN 0-7869-0483-6).

== Plot summary ==
King of the Dead is a novel about Azalin and his history as a powerful wizard, as he has begun to resent the dark land that he rules with his vast powers, since he is unable to find happiness while being tormented over and over by the death of his son.

== Reception ==
Andy Butcher reviewed King of the Dead for Arcane magazine, rating it an 8 out of 10 overall. He commented that "Gene De Weese is yet another New York Times best-selling author who has been persuaded by TSR to write an AD&D-based novel. The experience gained from over three dozen previously published horror, science fiction and non-fiction books has stood him in pretty good stead, and King of the Dead joins the ever-growing number of Ravenloft novels that are genuinely horrific." He added that "Weese's clever manipulation of time and the order of events gives the reader just enough information to engender a sense of eerie foreboding and the awful inevitability of fate, without allowing the story to become predictable and boring - thankfully, you never really know what to expect next. King of the Dead is a dark novel which relies, for the most part, on its skillfully crafted atmosphere, a technique which lends greater impact to the few graphically disturbing scenes." Butcher concluded his review by saying, "Although the story itself is of little direct use for a referee looking to steal some ideas, it's nevertheless well worth a look for any fans of horror games - Ravenloft or otherwise - due to its skillfully crafted atmosphere. There are elements here that could be used to great effect in almost any horror game you care to mention, and you'll get an extremely good read into the bargain. Good stuff and highly recommended."

== Reviews ==
- Review by Don D'Ammassa (1996) in Science Fiction Chronicle, #190 October 1996
