= Carribean Fragoza =

American writer

Carribean Fragoza is an American journalist, writer, and artist. She is the founder and co-director of the arts collective, South El Monte Art Posse (SEMAP). In 2023, she received a Whiting Award for her short story collection Eat the Mouth That Feeds You.

== Life ==
She grew up in South El Monte. She graduated from the University of California, Los Angeles where she majored in Comparative Literature and Chicana/o Studies. She went on to graduate from the California Institute of the Arts with an M.F.A. in Fiction.

== Works ==
- Eat the Mouth That Feeds You, City Lights Books, 2021. ISBN 9780872868335
- Guzman, Romeo; Fragoza, Carribean; Cummings, Alex Sayf; Reft, Ryan, eds. (2020). East of East: The Making of Greater El Monte. New Brunswick: Rutgers University Press. ISBN 978-1-9788-0548-4.
