= Robh Ruppel =

American artist

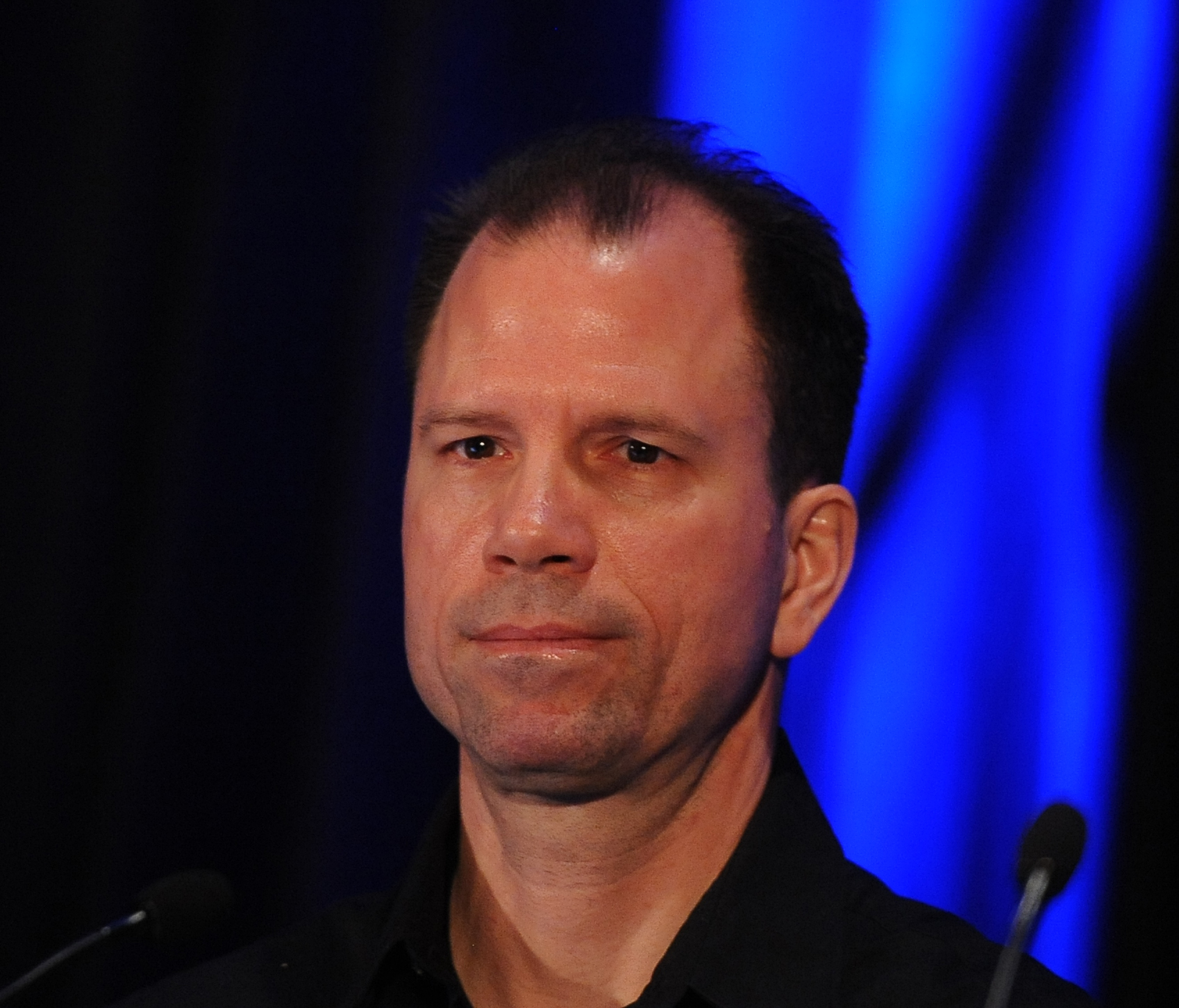
- Robh Ruppel at the 2012 Game Developers Conference
- Born: U.S.
- Known for: Fantasy art

Robh Ruppel is an American artist best known for his work on role-playing game products. Critic Joseph Szadkowski of The Washington Times has referred to him as a "horror genius".

== Early life ==
Robh Ruppel grew up in Bellaire, Texas, and attended High School for the Performing and Visual Arts in Houston. His parents were Roger (an architect) and Judy Ruppel.

== Career ==
Robh Ruppel worked for TSR for several years beginning in 1992, producing cover and interior art for products from Forgotten Realms, Dragonlance, and Ravenloft settings, among others. In 1994, he began producing artwork for the Planescape setting as well, which constituted the majority of this career with TSR. When TSR was purchased by Wizards of the Coast, he also illustrated cards for Magic: The Gathering.

Ruppel worked as a teacher at the Art Center College of Design in Pasadena, California, where he previously studied industrial design and illustration as a student.

Robh Ruppel is a production designer and concept artist working in games and feature films. He art directed Meet the Robinsons and Brother Bear for Disney. He won a Game Developers Choice Awards for Best Art Direction for Uncharted 2.

== Reception ==
In his 2023 book Monsters, Aliens, and Holes in the Ground, RPG historian Stu Horvath noted in his review of Planescape that Ruppel was integral to the look and feel of the campaign setting, writing, "The art picks up where the words leave off. Planescape is the apex of the aesthetic-driven, high-concept Dungeons & Dragons setting. Dana Knutson developed all of the concept artwork for the setting, which Robh Ruppel turned into covers."

== Works ==
=== Role-playing games ===
- The Gothic Earth Gazetteer (1995)
