= Chet Williamson =

American novelist

- Born: Chester Carlton Williamson; 1948 (age 77–78); Elizabethtown, Pennsylvania, U.S.
- Education: Indiana University of Pennsylvania (BS)
- Occupation: Author
- Website: www.chetwilliamson.com

Chester Carlton Williamson (born 1948) is an American author, mainly of horror, science fiction, and fantasy literature. He has written nearly 20 books and over 100 short stories published in Esquire, The New Yorker, Playboy, and many other magazines and anthologies.

== Biography ==
Chet Williamson was born and raised in Elizabethtown, Pennsylvania. His father worked at Olmstead Air Force Base and New Cumberland Army Depot, and his mother, whose lineage is Pennsylvania Dutch, was a homemaker. Williamson attended Elizabethtown Area High School, and graduated from Indiana University of Pennsylvania. He earned a B.S. at Indiana University of Pennsylvania in 1970 and went on to be a teacher at public schools in Cleveland, Ohio. A pulp collector and Lovecraft fan, Williamson attended the first World Fantasy Convention in Providence in 1975 and photographed many of the panelists. He also was a professional actor before becoming a freelance writer in 1986, when his first novel, Soulstorm, was published. His ghost story/psychological thriller, "Revenant", was produced at Theater of the Seventh Sister in Lancaster, PA, in 2007.

His earlier novels include Second Chance, an ecological thriller/romance, Ash Wednesday, Reign, and Dreamthorp, which took place in a fictionalized version of Mount Gretna, Pennsylvania's Chautauqua section. His story, "Gandhi at the Bat", was made into a short film by Stephanie Argy and Alec Boehm. Working with Elizabethtown College, Williamson wrote the 350-page book "Uniting Work and Spirit: A Centennial History of Elizabethtown College", which covers the first 100 years of the school's history and took him two years to write; Williamson explained, "The college wanted somebody with no preconceived ideas about the institution to write this history, but they needed someone familiar with the area." In 2003, Williamson received the International Horror Guild Award for an Outstanding Collection Published in 2002 for his book, Figures in Rain, a collection of 27 of his short stories and novelettes, published between 1981 and 2002, with two new stories written especially for the collection. He has been shortlisted twice for the World Fantasy Award, six times for the Horror Writers Association's Bram Stoker Award, and once for the Mystery Writers of America's Edgar Award. Williamson has also published a children's picture book, "Pennsylvania Dutch Night Before Christmas." His short fiction has appeared in anthologies, as well as magazines including The New Yorker, Esquire and Playboy. His books have been translated and published in many languages and countries, including France, Germany, Italy, Japan, and Russia. Crossroad Press has reprinted many of his out of print books.

Williamson also authored Kaikon, a chapbook published by Phantasmagoria Publications of Toronto. Consisting of one previously published story, "The Pebbles of Sai-No-Kawara", and one new story, "Blanket Man", the chapbook was printed in 2006, but the publisher did not release the book because of production difficulties with the accompanying wooden and resin box. Of the edition of 200 copies, the publisher sent a number of copies to the author. There are no plans to further distribute the book.

From 2001 to 2007, Williamson was the lead singer and guitarist for the Irish duo Fire in the Glen, in which he was partnered with fiddler and bodhranist Tom Knapp.

A lifelong member of the Actors' Equity Association, Williamson eventually resumed his acting career, and has performed in plays and musicals at Lancaster's Fulton Opera House and Theater of the Seventh Sister. Williamson portrayed college professor Frederick Miller in the 2006 Fulton Opera House staged reading of "Any Day Now" by David Rush, and Jane Holahan of the Lancaster New Era commented: "These actors were terrific. Williamson, whom I'd only known as an author, was a revelation, infusing Miller with intelligence and great humor." Williamson played a Baltimore Herald reporter as part of the Theater of the Seventh Sister in its 2007 production of "Inherit the Wind," at Millersville University's Rafters Theatre. Laura Knowles of the Lancaster New Era called Williamson one of "quite a few standouts in the stellar cast […] as the Baltimore newsman E.K. Hornbeck, who serves as our cynical conscience, warning us to not accept everything we have been taught and to challenge ourselves to think." Williamson also voices audio books. Susan E. Lindt of the Intelligencer Journal Lancaster also praised his performance: "The biggest standout is Elizabethtown actor Chet Williamson as acidic critic E.K. Hornbeck, the play's version of real-life Baltimore Sun political commentator H.L. Mencken." Lindt added that "Hornbeck makes no bones about being a bottom-feeder, and Williamson is pricelessly snide and smug when he oozes Hornbeck lines". Williamson also appeared with the Theater of the Seventh Sister for their Christmas show in 2007, portraying the narrator in "The Long Christmas Dinner".

In 2010, he began recording performances of Andrew Vachss's short stories, as well as some of his own. He has also recorded unabridged audiobooks of several of his novels, as well as works by Michael Moorcock, Tom Piccirilli, and Zoe Winters for Crossroad Press/Springbook Audio.

Williamson's 1987 horror novel, Ash Wednesday, was released by Crossroad Press in 2011 as an e-book; an online promotion for the e-book, in which the title was the day's sponsor of the website Kindle Nation, took the book's Kindle ranking in horror from around No. 90,000 to No. 23. The book earned a place in Supernatural Literature of the World: An Encyclopedia, and Williamson noted: "this edition also contains the final chapter that was edited out of the first edition, so is complete for the first time. The town in Ash Wednesday, Merridale, Pa., is based on Elizabethtown."

== Bibliography ==
=== Novels ===
- Soulstorm (1986)
- Ash Wednesday (1987)
- McKain's Dilemma (1988)
- Lowland Rider (1988)
- Dreamthorp (1989)
- Reign (1990)
- Mordenheim (1994)
- Second Chance (1994)
- Hell: A Cyberpunk Thriller (1995)
- The Crow: City of Angels (1996)
- Murder in Cormyr (1996)
- The Crow: Clash By Night (1998)
- Pennsylvania Dutch Night Before Christmas (2000)
- Uniting Work and Spirit: A Centennial History of Elizabethtown College (2001)
- The Story of Noichi the Blind (2007)
- Pennsylvania Dutch Alphabet (2007)
- Defenders of the Faith (2011)
- Robert Bloch's Psycho: Sanitarium (2016)

=== Collections ===
- Figures in Rain: Weird And Ghostly Tales (2002)
- The Night Listener and Others (2015)
- A Little Blue Book of Bibliomancy (2016)

=== Chapbooks ===
- The House of Fear: A Study in Comparative Religions (1989)
- Kaikon (Remorse) (unreleased; planned for 2006)

=== Short fiction ===
(Uncollected)

- The Wrong Way (1981)
- Gandhi at the Bat (1983)
- The Personal Touch (1983)
- A Scent of the Soul (1983)
- Rosinante (1984)
- Will the Real Sam Starburst ... (1984)
- A Matter of Sensitivity (1985)
- The Undertaker's Wedding (1986)
- Some Jobs Are Simple (1986) (non-genre)
- Getting Enough (1987)
- Sen Yen Babbo & the Heavenly Host (1987)
- Letters to Mother (1987)
- Ants (1987)
- Play Dead (1987)
- What Can a Child Do? (1988)
- Blood Night (1989)
- Eternal Ties (1989)
- Fayhorn and the Golden Nest (1989)
- How Hamster Loved the Actroid with Garbo's Eyes (1989)
- Assurances of the Self Extinction of Man (1989)
- Muscae Volitantes (1990)
- The Treasure of the Nassasalars (1990)
- Change of Life (1991)
- Calm Sea and Prosperous Voyage (1991)
- The Best Part (1991)
- First Kill (1991) (non-genre)
- City Hunger (1991)
- Mushrooms (1992) (non-genre)
- Scalps (1993)
- The Moment the Face Falls (1993)
- Perfect Days (1993)
- Dusty Death (1994)
- Watching the Burning (1994)
- Double Trouble (1994)
- The Last Belsnickel (1994)
- A Fly Called Jesus (1996)
- Dr. Joe (1996)
- Jacob Horst and the Dark Grocer (1997)
- Where Their Fire is Not Quenched (2000)
- The Story of Noichi the Blind (2007)
- The Autumn Game (2008)
- Detritus (2013)
- She Sits and Smiles (2015)
- Out of Balance (2015).
- That Still, Bleeding Object of Desire (2016)
- Hell Among the Yearlings (2018)
- Send My Body to My Mother, Lord... (2019)
- Political Science (2019)
- Blood Harmony (2024)

=== Series ===
- The Searchers
  - 1. City of Iron (1998)
  - 2. Empire of Dust (1998)
  - 3. Siege of Stone (1999)

== Awards ==
Year	Award	Category	Work	Result	Ref.
1987	Bram Stoker Award	Novel	Ash Wednesday	Nominated	
1988	Bram Stoker Award	Short Fiction	The Music of the Dark Time	Nominated	
1989	Bram Stoker Award	Short Fiction	Yore Skin's Jes's Soft 'n Purdy' He Said	Nominated	
1989	Bram Stoker Award	Long Fiction	The Confessions of St. James	Nominated	
1990	Bram Stoker Award	Novel	Reign	Nominated	
1990	Bram Stoker Award	Short Fiction	From the Papers of Helmut Hecher	Nominated	
1990	World Fantasy Award	Short Fiction	Yore Skin's Jes's Soft 'n Purdy' He Said	Nominated	
1990	Locus Award	Collection	Yore Skin's Jes's Soft 'n Purdy' He Said	Nominated	
2002	International Horror Guild Award	Short Form	The Sundowners	Nominated	
2002	International Horror Guild Award	Collection	Figures in Rain	Won	
2003	World Fantasy Award	Collection	Figures in Rain	Nominated	
