= Elaine Bergstrom =

American novelist

- Occupation: Novelist
- Writing career
- Pen name: Marie Kiraly
- Genres: Fantasy, horror
- Notable awards: Lord Ruthven Award (2001)

Elaine Bergstrom is an American author in the genres of fantasy and horror. She has had 13 novels published. She has been described by the Milwaukee Journal Sentinel as "one of Wisconsin's best-known horror novelists".

== Personal life ==
Bergstrom was born and raised in Cleveland. She had polio as a child, which she says brought her an early awareness of – and comfort with – death. She studied at Marquette University in Milwaukee, Wisconsin, and graduated with a degree in journalism with a minor in Latin American studies. She remained in Milwaukee to establish her career.

Residing in Bay View, Bergstrom is divorced, raising two children, one with Down syndrome.

== Career ==
Bergstrom's writing career started in advertising and newspaper reporting, including as a freelance writer for The Milwaukee Journal. She taught some writing classes at Milwaukee Area Technical College. While working as a copywriter in the early 1980s, she returned to creative writing; her first published piece of fiction was her first novel, Shattered Glass, the first in a series of vampire novels. Published in 1989, the novel introduced the character of the immortal Stephen Austra and artist Helen Wells, who had polio, along with Steffen's family of hereditary vampires. Its setting is Cleveland and nearby suburbs, in the 1950s. The novel was a critical success, and since then, Bergstrom has written five other novels in the series, including Daughter of the Night, which featured Elizabeth Bathory as a half-breed Austra vampire.

Using her grandmother's name, Marie Kiraly, Bergstrom wrote a sequel to Dracula called Mina ... The Dracula Story Continues and its sequel, Blood to Blood ... The Dracula Story Continues, which both look at Mina Harker as a woman changed by her experience in Transylvania, struggling to find her way in the repressive Victorian society. Both were featured in the Science Fiction Book Club (the former for more than a decade) and Doubleday Book Club.

For Glass and its sequel Blood Rites, she visited a number of major art glass producers. For the novel Madeline ... After the Fall of Usher, she adopted Poe's journalistic style to tell a story in which the details of the last few months of Poe's life are correct, with her own fictional story overlaid on them.

Bergstrom wrote novels for the Ravenloft setting, including Tapestry of Dark Souls (1993) and Baroness of Blood (1995). Tapestry of Dark Souls introduced the first lesbian couple in a D&D/TSR world; Bergstrom has a significant gay following.

She also works as a television critic and feature writer. Her interviews have included the novelist David Morrell and director Wes Craven.
