= Mordenheim =

1994 horror fantasy novel

- Author: Chet Williamson
- Language: English
- Series: Ravenloft series
- Genre: Fantasy novel
- Published: 1994 (TSR, Inc.)
- Publication place: United States
- Media type: Print (Paperback)
- Pages: 313 pp (first edition, paperback)
- ISBN: 978-0786902064 (first edition, paperback)
- Preceded by: The Enemy Within
- Followed by: Tales of Ravenloft

Mordenheim is a fantasy horror novel by Chet Williamson, set in the world of Ravenloft, and based on the Dungeons & Dragons game. It was published by TSR in 1994.

== Plot summary ==
After his wife dies, scientist Victor Mordenheim envisions bringing her back to life in a new host body. He first experiments by creating a living being, Adam, from the bodies of the dead. Mordenheim then uses two inexperienced spiritualists, Friederich and Hilda, to find a young woman to house his wife's spirit. Adam objects to Mordenheim's plan and kidnaps the young woman chosen for the experiment. Friederich and Hilda then pursue Adam.

Critics noted the strong similarity to Mary Shelley's gothic horror novel Frankenstein.

== Publication history ==
Seeking to create a new setting for its Dungeons & Dragons fantasy role-playing game franchise, TSR released Ravenloft, a horror campaign setting. It proved very popular, and over the next decade, TSR released many adventures and supplements for the Ravenloft setting, including a series of novels. The ninth of these novels was Mordenheim, written by Chet Williamson with cover art by Roger Loveless, published in 1994.

== Reception ==
Writing for Science Fiction Chronicle, critic Don D'Ammassa noted that in recent works, "TSR has been illuminating the dark side of fantasy with its Ravenloft series." D'Ammassa called the novel "an elaborate retelling of the Frankenstein story ... An atmospheric story heavy on gothic elements and despite its clear debt to Mary Shelley, it's the best entry yet in this series."

In the November 1994 issue of Kliatt, Gail Roberts noted "Perspective shifts as the narrative voice changes from Adam to the young assistants, and so on, but not in a confusing way." Roberts concluded this was "a worthy addition to the Ravenloft series."
