= Adam's Wrath =

Dungeons & Dragons adventure module

- Authors: Lisa Smedman

Adam's Wrath is an adventure module for the 2nd edition of the Advanced Dungeons & Dragons fantasy role-playing game.

== Plot summary ==
Adam's Wrath is an adventure which pits mid-level PCs against Doctor Victor Mordenheim and his minions. The adventure includes a visit to a haunted mansion, a showdown with living snow, and a climax on the Isle of Agony.

== Publication history ==
Adam's Wrath was written by Lisa Smedman, and published by TSR, Inc. Doug Stewart did editing and additional development.

== Reception ==
Rick Swan reviewed Adam's Wrath for Dragon magazine #207 (July 1994). He reviewed this adventure with the supplement Van Richten's Guide to the Created, and commented that the "AD&D game meets Frankenstein in these first-rate supplements for the Ravenloft setting." He suggested considering "Guide to the Created a warm-up for the Adam's Wrath adventure". According to Swan, the "most unforgettable moment comes early, when the party regains consciousness in Mordenheim's lightning tower. I don't want to give it away, but suffice to say that when you awaken, 'Something is wrapped around your head, covering your eyes...'"
