= Champions of the Mists =

Tabletop role-playing game supplement

- Genre: Role-playing games
- Publisher: TSR
- Publication date: 1998

Champions of the Mists is an accessory for the 2nd edition of the Advanced Dungeons & Dragons fantasy role-playing game, published in 1998.

== Contents ==
Champions of the Mists is a sourcebook which provides information on how the character classes interact with the Ravenloft setting, and the book provides new character class kits, and a number of non-player characters from books in TSR's fiction line, as well as past published adventures and editions of Ravenloft. The book begins by briefly introduction the various classes of Champions of the Mists, covering the four core classes of warrior, wizard, cleric, and thief, but not the new classes from Domains of Dread or optional classes from the Player's Handbook. The next section, "The Crucible", lists new character class kits for Ravenloft.

== Publication history ==
Champions of the Mists was written by William W. Connors. It was published in June 1998.

== Reception ==
Champions of the Mists was reviewed by the online version of Pyramid on July 23, 1998. The reviewer observed that for many years, "Ravenloft has been a setting that characters came to from another campaign and adventured in only briefly", but that with the release of the hardcover Domains of Dread, "TSR made it a place where characters can start off in the demi-realm with their own classes and secret societies" and felt that Champions of the Mists furthers that effort. The reviewer felt that the book omitting the new classes from Domanins of Dread and the optional classes from the Player's Handbook was not a great difficulty "if one uses the ideas here and applies them in a slightly different manner to the class in question. Most of the notes for a warrior can apply to a paladin or even a ranger with little tinkering."

== Reviews ==
- Envoyer #24
- Backstab #11
