= The Enemy Within (novel) =

1994 novel by Christie Golden

- First edition
- Author: Christie Golden
- Cover artist: Jennell Jaquays (Note: Credited as Paul Jaquays.)
- Language: English
- Series: Ravenloft series
- Genre: Fantasy novel
- Published: 1994 (TSR, Inc.)
- Publication place: United States
- Media type: Print (Paperback)
- Pages: 311
- ISBN: 1-56076-887-8
- Preceded by: I, Strahd: The Memoirs of a Vampire
- Followed by: Mordenheim

The Enemy Within is a 1994 fantasy horror novel by Christie Golden, set in the world of Ravenloft, and based on the Dungeons & Dragons game.

== Plot summary ==
Sir Tristan Hiregaard periodically transforms into Malken, an evil beastly creature who controls a large criminal empire. Tristan is terrified by these transformations, and sets out to destroy his evil side.

== Reviews ==
- Review by Don D'Ammassa (1994) in Science Fiction Chronicle #172 (April & May 1994).
