= Chris Nichols =

American journalist

- Occupations: journalist, author

Chris Nichols is an American columnist, editor, preservationist, and author. He has written the "Ask Chris" column as an associate editor of LA Magazine since 2000.

== Career ==
Nichols, a former chairman of the Los Angeles Modern Committee of the Los Angeles Conservancy, works to preserve the mid century modern architecture of Los Angeles. He began writing the "Ask Chris" column for Los Angeles Magazine in 2000. In "Ask Chris", Nichols answers readers' questions about Los Angeles area history and people. Chris Nichols produces an annual Halloween-themed Spooks Tour.

Nichols is the author of The Leisure Architecture of Wayne McAllister, a book largely about historic neon signage and mid-century structures in Las Vegas and other cities. This book received positive reviews, including from Publishers Weekly, and it won a 2008 Independent Publisher Bronze Medal award. In 2018, Taschen published Walt Disney's Disneyland a definitive book on the creation of Disneyland written by Chris Nichols and co-authored by his wife, Charlene Nichols. In 2024, Angel City Press and Los Angeles Public Library published Bowlarama: The Architecture of Mid-Century Bowling Alleys, an illustrated hardcover book about the lost iconic and exotic bowling centers, written by Chris Nichols with additional contribution by Adrien Biondo. The book is a 2024 Silver Winner for Next Generation Indie Book Awards or INDIE Book of the Year Awards in the category Adult Nonfiction: Popular Culture, and 2025 Gold Winner of Independent Publisher Book Awards in the category Popular Culture.

== Published works ==
- The Leisure Architecture of Wayne McAllister (2007); ISBN 1-58685-699-5
- Walt Disney’s Disneyland (2018); ISBN 3-8365-6348-7
- Bowlarama: The Architecture of Mid-Century Bowling (2024); ISBN 1-62640-131-4
