= Scott Haring =

American game designer and magazine editor (1958–2025)

- Born: Scott Dennis Haring; June 16, 1958; Tulsa, Oklahoma, U.S.
- Died: July 1, 2025 (aged 67)
- Occupation: Game designer

Scott Dennis Haring (June 16, 1958 – July 1, 2025) was an American game designer who worked primarily on role-playing games.

== Early life and education ==
Scott Haring was born in Tulsa, Oklahoma on June 16, 1958, to Robert and Joan Haring. Haring earned a Bachelors of Science degree in Journalism from Texas A&M University. During his time at university, Haring displayed a talent for singing.

== Career ==
Following graduation, Haring began working in the adventure gaming industry in 1982. Haring had a long career with Steve Jackson Games, having worked at the company five different times over a period of 15 years. Haring worked as the Car Wars line editor, and became editor on the new magazine Autoduel Quarterly when it debuted in 1983. He also wrote and edited for Ghostbusters and GURPS and served as the editor for Pyramid magazine. Steve Jackson related that "when [Haring] put on the editor hat, he was one of the few people I would trust, without checking, to write or edit good copy." Haring was also a columnist for Comics & Games Retailer from 1987.

Haring was newly hired at TSR when he added four pages of purely game material to a series of "comic modules" published by TSR West, since TSR had an exclusive license for comic books with DC. Haring identified Empires of the Sands (1988) as his first big project that he worked on at TSR. He also wrote and edited for the Top Secret/S.I. and Marvel Super Heroes role-playing games. His other D&D design work includes The Republic of Darokin (1989) and Otherlands (1990).

Haring was also the editor for The Gamer magazine. He lived in central Texas with his wife and stepson.

== Personal life and death ==
Haring lived most of his life in Austin, Texas, and continued singing in community choirs. He was an avid baseball fan – especially of the Houston Astros – and travelled to every MLB ballpark and many minor league ballparks as well.

Haring died from complications of pneumonia on July 1, 2025, at age 67.
