= Knight of the Black Rose =

1991 novel by James Lowder

- Cover of the first edition
- Author: James Lowder
- Cover artist: Clyde Caldwell
- Language: English
- Series: Ravenloft series
- Genre: Fantasy novel
- Published: 1991 (TSR, Inc.)
- Publication place: United States
- Media type: Print (Paperback)
- Pages: 313 pp (first edition, paperback)
- ISBN: 1560761563 (first edition, paperback)
- Preceded by: Vampire of the Mists
- Followed by: Dance of the Dead

Knight of the Black Rose is the second novel in the Ravenloft books gothic horror series. Written by James Lowder, it is set both in Krynn and more prominently, the Demiplane of Dread, location of the Ravenloft campaign setting.

== Plot summary ==
In Krynn, Lord Soth finally learns that there is a price to pay for his long history of evil deeds. Soth is transported to Barovia by some dark powers, where he faces the minions of Count Strahd Von Zarovich, the vampire lord of that nightmare land within the Raveloft demi-plane of dread. But with only a captive Vistani woman and an untrustworthy ghost for allies, Lord Soth soon discovers that he may have to join forces with the powerful vampire, (Strahd von Zarovich) if he is to escape the realm of terror.

== Reception ==
Knight of the Black Rose appeared on the 2024 Game Rant "31 Best Dungeons & Dragons Novels, Ranked" list at #14.

== Reviews ==
- Magia i Miecz #54 (June 1998) (Polish)
- Kliatt
- Science Fiction Chronicle
