= Neither Man nor Beast =

Role playing adventure published in 1995

- Genre: Role-playing games
- Publisher: TSR
- Publication date: 1995

Neither Man nor Beast is an adventure for the 2nd edition of the Advanced Dungeons & Dragons fantasy role-playing game, published in 1995.

== Plot summary ==
Neither Man nor Beast is an adventure for the Ravenloft setting in which the player characters become stranded on a desert island after a violent storm.

== Publication history ==
Neither Man nor Beast was published in 1995.

== Reception ==
Trenton Webb reviewed Neither Man nor Beast for Arcane magazine, rating it a 9 out of 10 overall. He considered being stranded on an island that is "quiet - too quiet..." to be "a classic kick off for a classic scenario". He found that "death is a very real option, as really it should be for any poor soul that becomes marooned here in the Demi-Plane of Dread". He found it hard to describe the adventure as "the fun of this scenario relies heavily on intricately linked secrets, which even if alluded to would ruin the game" and that "even the island's name contains clues to its true nature", suggesting that the fun "is in the finding out, though, and the excitement in surviving to tell someone just what it was you found." Ramshaw concluded by saying that "Neither Man Nor Beast is an elegant standalone adventure. It could slot into non-Ravenloft campaigns easily - everyone goes to sea eventually - but it's best for folk who already know the Demi-Plane of Dread. For when the island's secret is revealed they'll know precisely how slim their chances are."
