= Requiem: The Grim Harvest =

Tabletop role-playing game supplement

- Genre: Role-playing games
- Publisher: TSR
- Publication date: 1996
- Media type: Boxed set

Requiem: The Grim Harvest is an accessory for the 2nd edition of the Advanced Dungeons & Dragons fantasy role-playing game, published in 1996.

== Contents ==
Requiem: Grim Harvest is a boxed set containing three booklets: Death Triumphant, Necropolis and Requiem. Death Triumphant is the final part of the Grim Harvest campaign in which the player characters battle the lich Azalin, lord of Darkon. Necropolis presents a geographical guide focusing on the land in which Death Triumphant takes place. Requiem creates a new sub-game system by extrapolating from where the characters ended the campaign.

== Publication history ==
Requiem: The Grim Harvest was published by TSR, Inc. in 1996.

== Reception ==
Trenton Webb reviewed Requiem: Grim Harvest for Arcane magazine, rating it a 7 out of 10 overall. Requiem: Grim Harvest is a boxed set containing three booklets: Death Triumphant, Necropolis and Requiem. Death Triumphant is the conclusion of the Grim Harvest campaign in which the player characters battle against Azalin, the Lich lord of Darkon. Necropolis is a geographical guide to the land where Death Triumphant is set. Requiem extrapolates from the party's position at the end of the campaign to create its own sub-game system. He quotes the George Romero zombie film line "when Hell is full the dead will walk the earth" and notes that with this "This rather functional, if wonderfully horrific, philosophy [...] Requiem: Grim Harvest enables Ravenlofters to experience a world in which something spookily similar is occurring. And it's not very nice. Good fun, certainly, but not very nice." Webb comments that "This three-book boxed set – Death Triumphant, Necropolis and Requiem - is an odd mix" and notes that the Necropolis book would be useful "so that after the adventure has run its (un)natural course the party can continue to romp around this most gothic of countries", while "Requiem, is a truly queer fish [...] and it is breathtakingly different." He comments on the adventure itself: "As the final installment of the trilogy, Death Triumphant really delivers. Picking up the pace from the slightly more sedate second episode, the players are instantly thrown into conflict with the most powerful denizens of Ravenloft as they race against the clock to avert an apocalypse. With a heart-stopping (quite literally) midsection and an exciting closing chase, this adventure is a frantic and fitting climax to a truly excellent series." Webb comments that "Necropolis is a good guide, crammed with fine and highly transportable adventure seeds. So even if you never run another Darkon adventure, you'll be able to plunder a few fine ideas and characters for other Ravenloft campaigns. The best of these being the absolutely ghastly Maggot Golem, which is pure Clive Barker and should definitely be used to turn players' stomachs the length and breadth of the land immediately." He comments that "Requiem, however, presents many problems - not the least of which is that the sub-system evolves out of Death Triumphant's climax, and so by describing its basis the adventure's shocking twist would be ruined. Essentially, Requiem inverts one of the basic tenets of AD&D game mechanics with dramatic effects. The resultant system is elegant and well executed, although it does feel a little clinical and contrived at times. It would make an ideal holiday game when you're looking for a quick hit adventure with some temporary characters, but otherwise this fine design exercise doesn't really have the legs for long-term play." Webb concludes the review by saying "The introduction of a boxed set at the endgame of a trilogy seems a little mercenary, especially when the first two episodes are so good that both players and referees will be desperate to see the campaign through to the end. But this climactic adventure is well worth the expense on its own. With the added benefit of some excellent adventure ideas in Necropolis and the curious Requiem system, you'd be mad not to inflict this most horrifying of sets on your players."

== Reviews ==
- Dragon #240
- Shadis #33
- Envoyer #2
