= J. Robert King =

American novelist

- Born: Phoenix, Arizona, U.S.
- Occupations: Novelist; editor; game designer
- Writing career
- Pen name: John R. King
- Genres: Role-playing games, fantasy

J. Robert King is an American fantasy novelist and former editor and game designer. He also writes non-fantasy fiction as John R. King.

== Biography ==
J. Robert King was born in Phoenix, Arizona, and grew up in northwestern Indiana. He knew he wanted to be a writer since fourth grade: "I wanted to be a writer because of The Chronicles of Narnia (by C.S. Lewis). A teacher read one of them to us in third grade... I thought I'd check out the rest of the books. I loved them so much; they provided such an escape. I really wanted to be able to create that sort of escape for other people. They were the sort of fantasy that got me excited about writing." King majored in Theology and the Humanities at Valparaiso University. He worked for two years as an editor for a non-fiction publisher, and then took an editing job at TSR.

King worked on a number of products for the Dungeons & Dragons fantasy role-playing game; his design work includes the Monstrous Compendium Forgotten Realms Appendix II (1991), the Book of Crypts (1991) for Ravenloft, Unsung Heroes (1992) and Tales of the Lance (1992) for Dragonlance, and Aurora's Whole Realms Catalog (1992) for Forgotten Realms. He wrote his first novel, Heart of Midnight, for the Ravenloft setting, soon after his hiring at TSR; other novels include Carnival of Fear for Ravenloft, Vinas Solamnus for Dragonlance, and the Planescape Blood Wars Trilogy: Blood Hostages, Abyssal Warriors, and Planar Powers.

King treasures two of his earliest books, Rogues to Riches and Summerhill Hounds, both intended for younger readers: "They're two of my favorite books... but probably read the least. I think when we write for the older, mainstream audience we tend to make it gritty to convince people that these aren't fairy tales but "real" fantasy. I felt obliged to write something more optimistic, hopeful, and beautiful." Planar Powers, for which he won the 1997 Origins Award for best game-related fiction, "is the third book in a very strange trilogy. The thing about that book is its sense of experimentation and humor. In writing it, I decided I wanted to write a book backward, starting broad and ending very narrow, a complex thing that became more simple. The first book [in the series] is a tragedy, in which the character's flaw leads to his destruction. The second book is a passion play, in which the character is redeemed by the sacrifice of another, and the third book I wrote as a comedy, in which the flaws of the character lead to his salvation."

With the success of his writing (and with two young sons by the late 1990s), King left his editing position to write full-time. He wrote a number of novels for the Magic: the Gathering setting, including Time Streams and a trilogy of the Phyrexian Cycle. and the second book in the tie-in novel series for ArenaNet's Guild Wars 2, Edge of Destiny. He also wrote the Arthurian novel Mad Merlin for Tor Books, followed by Lancelot du Lethe, and Le Morte D'Avalon as the Mad Merlin trilogy, among other novels and various short fiction forms.
