= Christie Golden =

American writer (born 1963)

- Born: November 21, 1963 (age 62); Atlanta, Georgia, U.S.
- Education: University of Virginia
- Writing career
- Pen name: Jadrien Bell
- Language: English

Christie Golden (born November 21, 1963) is an American author. She has written many novels and several short stories in fantasy, horror and science fiction.

== Career ==
Golden has written many novels and several short stories in the fields of science fiction, fantasy and horror. Among her many projects are over a dozen Star Trek novels, over a dozen for gaming giant Blizzard's World of Warcraft and StarCraft novels, and three books for the now finished Fate of the Jedi series of Star Wars novels. Her co-authors on that series were Troy Denning and Aaron Allston.

She launched TSR's Ravenloft line of novels in 1991 with her first novel, Vampire of the Mists, and is the creator of the elven vampire archetype in fantasy fiction. She followed up with Dance of the Dead and The Enemy Within. Golden has also written short stories set in the Forgotten Realms, appearing in anthologies in which she further explores the character of the elven vampire Jander Sunstar, whom she established in Vampire of the Mists. Golden has written at a dozen Star Trek: Voyager novels including the popular Dark Matters trilogy, the Homecoming duology, and the Spirit Walk duology.

Golden is also the author of two original fantasy novels from Ace Books, King's Man & Thief and Instrument of Fate, which made the 1996 Nebula Preliminary Ballot.

Among her work in the gaming fantasy novels, she wrote Warcraft: Lord of the Clans (2001), and World of Warcraft: Rise of the Horde (December 2006). She also authored a trilogy titled StarCraft: the Dark Templar Saga for Blizzard Entertainment and Simon and Schuster Pocketbooks. She also wrote World of Warcraft: Arthas: Rise of the Lich King which was released April 21, 2009. It was Golden's first New York Times bestseller. Subsequent Warcraft novels are The Shattering: Prelude to Cataclysm, Thrall: Twilight of the Aspects, Jaina Proudmoore: Tides of War, and War Crimes.

Under the name Jadrien Bell she wrote a fantasy thriller entitled A.D. 999, which won her the Colorado Author's League Award for Best Genre Novel in 1999.

She is currently hoping to reissue her original fantasy series, the Dancers Pentad. The first book in the series On Fire's Wings follows the discovery of the first of five dancers, Kevla the flame dancer. The second book In Stone's Clasp records both the flame dancer, Kevla and the stone dancer, the element of earth, Jareth. The book won her a second Colorado Author's League Award for Best Genre Novel in 2005. This series was released through Luna Books.

Golden has also written for Buffy the Vampire Slayer and Angel anthologies. She has written novels based on Steven Spielberg's Invasion America animated television show, and film producer and screenwriter Harve Bennett was so impressed with her Invasion America work that he invited her to Hollywood to write for the show - however, the show was not renewed for a second season.

Golden has authored four Assassin's Creed works. Her first, "Blackbeard: The Lost Journal", is a companion piece for the video game Assassin's Creed IV: Black Flag. Another Assassin's Creed book, the in-universe "Abstergo Employee Handbook" hit shelves in December 2014. "The Accidental Knight," a novel set in the world of Cryptozoic's online card game, HEX, was published later in 2014 as an online book. Her Star Wars: The Clone Wars novel titled Star Wars: Dark Disciple was published in July 2015. And in 2017 she published the official movie novelization of Valerian and the City of a Thousand Planets through Titan Books - ISBN 978-1-7856-5384-1.

She was the 2017 Winner of the IATMW's Faust Award.

== Personal life ==
Golden was born on November 21, 1963, in Atlanta, Georgia, US.

== Bibliography ==
- Instrument of Fate, Ace Books, April 1996
- King's Man and Thief, Ace Books, May 1997
- A.D. 999 (As Jadrien Bell), Ace Books, December 1999

=== Assassin's Creed ===
- Assassin's Creed IV Black Flag: Blackbeard – The Lost Journal, Insight Editions, March 2014
- Assassin's Creed Unity: Abstergo Entertainment – Employee Handbook, Insight Editions, November 2014
- Assassin's Creed: Heresy, Ubisoft Publishing, November 2016
- Assassin's Creed: The Official Movie Novelization, Ubisoft Publishing, December 2016, winner of the 2017 Scribe Award for Best Adapted Novel

=== The Final Dance ===
- The Final Dance Book 1: On Fire's Wings, LUNA Books, July 2003
- The Final Dance Book 2: In Stone's Clasp LUNA Books, September 2005
- The Final Dance Book 3: Under Sea's Shadow, LUNA Books, October 2007 (e-book only)

=== HEX: Shards of Fate ===
- The Accidental Knight, Hex Entertainment, LLC., November 2014

=== Invasion America ===
- Invasion America, Roc, February 1998
- Invasion America: On the Run, Roc, November 1998

=== Ravenloft ===
- Ravenloft: Vampire of the Mists, TSR, September 1991
- Ravenloft: Dance of the Dead, TSR, June 1992
- Ravenloft: The Enemy Within, TSR, February 1994

=== StarCraft ===
- StarCraft II: Devil's Due, Pocket Books, April 2011
- StarCraft II: Flashpoint, Gallery Books, November 2012

==== StarCraft: The Dark Templar Saga ====
- StarCraft: The Dark Templar Saga: Firstborn, Pocket Books, May 2007
- StarCraft: The Dark Templar Saga: Shadow Hunters, Pocket Books, November 2007
- StarCraft: The Dark Templar Saga: Twilight, Pocket Books, June 2009

=== Star Trek: Gateways ===
- Star Trek: Voyager: Gateways Book 5: No Man's Land, Pocket Books, October 2001
- Star Trek: Gateways Book 7: What Lay Beyond: In the Queue, Pocket Books, November 2001

=== Star Trek: The Next Generation ===
- Star Trek: The Next Generation: Double Helix Book 6: The First Virtue (with Michael Jan Friedman), Pocket Books, August 1999

=== Star Trek: The Original Series ===
- Star Trek: The Last Roundup, Pocket Books, July 2002

=== Star Trek: Voyager ===
- Star Trek: Voyager #6: The Murdered Sun, Pocket Books, February 1996
- Star Trek: Voyager #14: Marooned, Pocket Books, December 1997
- Star Trek: Voyager #16: Seven of Nine, Pocket Books, September 1998
- Star Trek: Voyager: Endgame, (with Diane Carey), Pocket Books, July 2001
- Star Trek: Voyager: Homecoming, Pocket Books, June 2003
- Star Trek: Voyager: The Farther Shore, Pocket Books, July 2003

==== Star Trek: Voyager: Dark Matters Trilogy ====
- Star Trek: Voyager #19: Dark Matters #1: Cloak and Dagger, Pocket Books, November 2000
- Star Trek: Voyager #20: Dark Matters #2: Ghost Dance, Pocket Books, November 2000
- Star Trek: Voyager #21: Dark Matters #3: Shadow of Heaven, Pocket Books, November 2000

==== Star Trek: Voyager: Spirit Walk ====
- Star Trek: Voyager: Spirit Walk Book 1: Old Wounds, Pocket Books, November 2004
- Star Trek: Voyager: Spirit Walk Book 2: Enemy of My Enemy, Pocket Books, December 2004

=== Star Wars ===
- Star Wars: Fate of the Jedi: Omen, Del Rey Books, June 2009
- Star Wars: Fate of the Jedi: Allies, Del Rey Books, May 2010
- Star Wars: Fate of the Jedi: Ascension, Del Rey Books, August 2011
- Star Wars: Dark Disciple, Del Rey Books, June 2015
- Star Wars Battlefront II: Inferno Squad, Del Rey Books, July 2017
- Star Wars: The Bucket (short story) published in Star Wars: From a Certain Point of View, Del Rey Books, October 2017
- The Truest Duty (short story) published in Star Wars: From a Certain Point of View: The Empire Strikes Back, Del Rey Books, November 2020

=== World of Warcraft ===
- Warcraft: Lord of the Clans, Pocket Books, October 2001
- World of Warcraft: Rise of the Horde, Pocket Books, December 2006
- World of Warcraft: Beyond the Dark Portal (with Aaron Rosenberg), Pocket Books, June 2008
- World of Warcraft: Arthas: Rise of the Lich King, Pocket Books, May 2009
- World of Warcraft: The Shattering: Prelude to Cataclysm, Pocket Books, October 2010
- World of Warcraft: Thrall: Twilight of the Aspects, Pocket Books, July 2011
- World of Warcraft: Jaina Proudmoore: Tides of War, Pocket Books, August 2012
- World of Warcraft: War Crimes, Gallery Books, May 2014; Pocket Books, May 2015
- Warcraft: Durotan: The Official Movie Prequel, Titan Books, May 2016
- Warcraft: The Official Movie Novelization, Titan Books, June 2016
- World of Warcraft: Before the Storm, June 2018
- World of Warcraft: Exploring Azeroth - Eastern Kingdoms, November 2020
- World of Warcraft: Sylvanas, March 2022
- World of Warcraft: Blood Ties, November 2025

=== Short stories and essays ===
- "One Last Drink," Realms of Valor, TSR, February 1993
- "Blood Sport," Realms of Infamy, TSR, December 1994
- "Witch Hunt" and "The Angel," 100 Wicked Little Witch Stories, Barnes & Noble, July 1995
- "One Good Bite," 100 Vicious Little Vampire Stories, Barnes & Noble, August 1995
- "Breathtaking Music," Blood Muse, Donald I. Fine, December 1995
- "The Quiet Place," Realms of Magic, TSR, December 1995
- "Summer Storms," Lammas Night, Baen Books, February, 1996
- "Stag Party," OtherWere, Ace Books, September 1996
- "The Play's the Thing," Miskatonic, DAW Books, Inc., November 1996
- "Though Hell Should Bar the Way," with A.C. Crispin, Highwaymen: Robbers and Rogues, DAW Books, Inc., June 1997
- "The Remaking of Millie McCoy," Urban Nightmares, Baen Books, November 1997
- "The Ultimate Weapon, Tales from Tethedril, Del Rey, September 1998
- "A Night at Sandrine's," Amazing Stories, December 1998
- "A Light in the Sky," Whitley Strieber's Aliens: An HWA Anthology, Pocket Books, December 1998
- "The White Doe," Tales of the Slayer, Simon & Schuster, 1999
- "Hard Crash," Star Trek S.C.E.: Have Tech, Will Travel, Pocket Books, 2001
- "The Sun Child," Angel: The Longest Night, Simon & Schuster, 2002
- "Where's the Religion in Willow's Wicca?", BenBella Books, 2003
- "Promises to Keep", Halo: Fractures, Gallery Books, 2016
- "The Bucket", Star Wars: From a Certain Point of View, Random House, 2017
- "Elegy", World of Warcraft: Battle for Azeroth, 2018
- "The Vow Eternal", World of Warcraft: Dragonflight, 2022

== See also ==
- List of horror fiction authors
