= Vampire of the Mists =

1991 novel by Christie Golden

- Cover of the first edition
- Author: Christie Golden
- Cover artist: Clyde Caldwell
- Language: English
- Series: Ravenloft series
- Genre: Fantasy novel
- Published: 1991 (TSR, Inc.)
- Publication place: United States
- Media type: Print (Paperback)
- Pages: 341 pp (first edition, paperback)
- ISBN: 1-56076-155-5 (first edition, paperback)
- OCLC: 26303502
- Preceded by: None
- Followed by: Knight of the Black Rose

Vampire of the Mists is the first novel in the Ravenloft books gothic horror series. Written by Christie Golden, it is set both in Waterdeep, a city in the Forgotten Realms world of Dungeons & Dragons, and more prominently, the Demiplane of Dread, location of the Ravenloft campaign setting.

== Plot summary ==
The story concerns Jander Sunstar, an elf vampire who, despite his affliction, attempts to remain as good as possible. On a trip to Waterdeep to drink the blood of patients of a mental hospital there, Jander falls in love with an inmate who introduces herself as Anna. For about one hundred years the immortal vampire visits Anna regularly, and Anna seems to be similarly ageless. Anna begins to become ill, and Jander, afraid of losing her, tries to turn her into a vampire. Anna refuses. In her last moments of life, when Jander asks her what ruined her mind, she answers "Barovia."

In a rage, Jander kills every last occupant of the asylum, and is transported to the Demiplane of Dread. There, he has his fortune told by a Vistani gypsy before befriending Count Strahd Von Zarovich. The predictions made by the fortune-teller all prove to be true later in the book, sometimes in multiple ways. After a very long period of time spent in Barovia, Jander discovers that the woman he knew as Anna was in truth Tatyana, wife of Strahd's Brother, Sergei, and the woman who drove Strahd to murder his own family. She escaped the castle as it entered the demiplane, but lost her mind in the process. Shocked, Jander bands together with a local cleric and a young thief, to the end of killing Strahd. They fail, though the severe damage they inflict on him forces him into an extended healing cycle thereby limiting the speed with which he increased in power as a spell-caster. To that end, Jander somewhat succeeded, at least for the time being, and more so prevented Strahd further access to any more of his own knowledge when he walks into the sunlight for his final death.

== Reception ==
Vampire of the Mists was #4 on CBR's 2020 "10 Of The Best DnD Stories To Start Off With" list — the article states that "Vampire Of The Mists not only provides a great introduction to the Ravenloft setting but also explains its connections to the base setting of Faérun. [...] It also provides insight on how to apply things like Vampires to a traditional D&D setting".

In the Io9 series revisiting older Dungeons & Dragons novels, Rob Bricken highlighted that Strahd is not the main villain of Vampire of the Mists and instead Strahd, Jander and Anna "have all been manipulated by the Demiplane of Dread itself". He compared the novel to both Bram Stoker’s Dracula and Anne Rice’s Interview With the Vampire, stating, "it’s a simpler, more basic version of both classics, of course, but I absolutely do not hold that against the book". He wrote that "Mists isn’t scary, per se, but Strahd wreaks enough horror and carnage to drive home that Ravenloft is much, much more sinister than the Forgotten Realms. It all comes together into a solid narrative. [...]. Vampire of the Mists is also a D&D novel published in the early ‘90s, which means hunks of it have, as usual, aged rather poorly. There’s the Vistani, a race of Romani analogues repeatedly called by the old slur, which isn’t great. Strahd is exclusively interested in creating a coven of sexy vampire ladies, which means a lot of female characters exist solely to be victims. [...] If you’re looking for a good vampire story, you could do significantly better than Vampire of the Mists, but if you’re someone rereading a bunch of 30-year-old Dungeons & Dragons novels, you could do much, much worse".

Vampire of the Mists appeared on the 2024 Game Rant "31 Best Dungeons & Dragons Novels, Ranked" list at #11.

== Reviews ==
The book received several reviews:

- Review by Scott Winnett (1991) in Locus #370, November 1991.
- Review by John C. Bunnell (1991) in Dragon Magazine, November 1991
- Review by Catherine B. Krusberg (1992) in The Vampire's Crypt, Spring 1992
- Kliatt (1992)
- Review by Marek Łacisz (1997) in Talizman #2-3 1997, p. 114-115 (in Polish)
