= Dungeons & Dragons campaign settings =

Timeline of release years
1977	Blackmoor
1978
1979
1980	Greyhawk
1981	Mystara
1982
1983	Ravenloft
1984	Pelinore
1984	Dragonlance
1984	Conan
1985	Lankhmar
1986	Kara-Tur
1986	Red Sonja
1987	Forgotten Realms
1988
1989	Spelljammer
1990	Hollow World
1991	Dark Sun
1992	Al-Qadim
1992	Thunder Rift
1993
1994	Birthright
1994	Council of Wyrms
1994	Kingdoms of Kalamar
1994	Planescape
1994	Red Steel
1995
1996	Arcane Age
1996	Savage Coast
1997	Jakandor
1997	Rokugan
1998
1999	Dragon Fist
1999	Diablo II
2000	Mahasarpa
2001
2002
2003	Ghostwalk
2003	Warcraft
2004	Eberron
2005
2006
2007	Nentir Vale
2008
2009
2010
2011
2012
2013
2014
2015
2016
2017
2018	Ravnica
2019
2020	Exandria
2020	Theros
2021	Strixhaven
2022	Radiant Citadel

The flexibility of the Dungeons & Dragons (D&D) game rules means that Dungeon Masters (DM) are free to create their own fantasy campaign settings. For those who wanted a pre-packaged setting in which to play, TSR, Wizards of the Coast (WotC), and other publishers have created many settings in which D&D games can be based; of these, the Forgotten Realms, an epic fantasy world, has been one of the most successful and critically acclaimed settings. Many campaign settings include standard sword and sorcery environments, while others borrow Asian, Central American, swashbuckling, horror and even spaceflight themes.

These are official D&D campaign settings that have been published or licensed by TSR or WotC. Theros and Ravnica originated in the Magic: The Gathering franchise, another property of WotC. A number of the settings here are no longer published or officially licensed, though all have active fan bases.

== Birthright ==
A setting in which the players took on the powers of the divinely empowered rulers of nations, with emphasis on tactical gameplay with a broad scope.

== Blackmoor ==
The original campaign setting played for D&D, created by Dave Arneson. Arneson created this setting for use in personal games with the Chainmail rules set in 1971, prior to Greyhawk and indeed Dungeons & Dragons itself. The D&D Blackmoor supplement was published in 1975. In 2004, Blackmoor was again published by Arneson and Zeitgeist Games. It was also run as a massively multiplayer role-playing game, or MMRPG, a type of living campaign.

== Conan and Red Sonja ==
In 1984, TSR released two AD&D Conan modules as licensed tie-ins with Conan the Destroyer (1984), the second Schwarzenegger film. CB1: Conan Unchained! is set in the Vilayet Sea. CB2: Conan Against Darkness! takes place in Aquilonia. In 1985, TSR released a stand-alone (non-D&D) Conan Role-Playing Game boxed set based on the Marvel Superheroes RPG system. In 1986, TSR published another AD&D module: RS1: Red Sonja Unconquered licensed from Red Sonja Corp., which is set on the Zaporoska River, and authored by Anne Gray McCready. All three AD&D modules (CB1, CB2, and RS1) contain a two-page setting overview of "The Hyborian World", with sections on history and geography, people, technology, monsters, spellcasters, and magic items. There are also Hyboria-specific adaptations of the AD&D rules: fear factor, luck points, and quick non-magical healing.

== Council of Wyrms ==
Council of Wyrms is a D&D boxed set, published in 1994, that includes rules for playing dragon, half dragon, and dragon servant characters. It includes three rule books: one for the base rules, one for dragon family and clan histories, and one for adventure modules. In 1999 it was slightly revised and reprinted as a hardcover book.

== Dark Sun ==
Released by TSR in 1991, Dark Sun diverges from the tone of "conventional" medieval fantasy, drawing heavy inspiration from novels like Dune and the Barsoom series. The campaign is set on the harsh desert world of Athas – once a lush planet teeming with life, it has since been stripped of its fertility by uncontrolled use of defiling magic and is now a desolate and savage place where civilization has retreated to city-states controlled by god-like Sorcerer-Kings.

Psionics are a dominant aspect of the setting and are as commonplace as magic in other D&D settings—native/latent psionic abilities are commonly found in individuals of all humanoid races and their powers are respected. Religion and divine magic is based on the worship of elemental forces, spirits or the Sorcerer-Kings themselves—the old gods have long abandoned the world.

Wizards and arcane spellcasters, on the other hand, are rarer and usually discriminated against, mainly because most of them are "defilers" who drain life force from the environment to power their magic. However, a small underground minority of magicians called "preservers" work to maintain life and ultimately restore the primeval lushness.

Playable humanoid races in Athas include the Thri-Kreen (mantis people) and Half-Giants, as well as warped variants of races found in other conventional fantasy settings: humans, the dominant race in most of known Athas, appear to be tougher than in other worlds; elves are nomadic desert dwellers and long-distance runners; halflings are depicted as savage jungle cannibals.

These elements, combined with a post-apocalyptic desert setting and the alien feel of Athas' native cultures, give Dark Sun a unique flavor among the various D&D worlds.

== Diablo II ==
Wizards released several pen and paper adaptations of the Diablo II video game, both for AD&D 2nd edition and D&D 3rd edition. Second edition products include The Bloodstone Tomb D&D Diablo II Fast-Play Game (1999), D&D Adventure Game: Diablo II Edition (boxed set, 2000), Diablo II: The Awakening (adventure, 2000), and Diablo II miniatures (2000). Third edition products include Diablo II: To Hell and Back (adventure, and its web enhancement "The Secret Cow Level") and Diablo II: Diablerie (supplement), all from 2001.

== Dragon Fist ==
Dragon Fist, released on the Wizards of the Coast website, was promoted as a new role playing game, describing itself in its introduction as an "AD&D variant". With its debut near the end of the lifespan of second edition, the variant rules blended rules found in different editions. For example, the game used the monster template of second edition, but the armor class rules of third edition. The campaign setting, created by Chris Pramas, is a China-inspired realm known as Tianguo, "a fictional land based on wuxia films and on Chinese folklore and legend". Beyond the initial release, the product was not supported.

== Dragonlance ==
Dragonlance was the first complete fictional world to be intentionally produced and marketed as an RPG supplement, with product tie-ins (novels, role-playing modules, figurines, etc.) prepared and manufactured when it was first released. The success of the Dragonlance series encouraged role-playing game producers to invent and market additional fictional game worlds. Dragonlance is an epic fantasy campaign focused on a war between good and evil gods and the return of dragons after centuries of absence. It was created by Tracy Hickman and his wife Laura, with tie-in novels by Tracy Hickman and Margaret Weis.

=== Time of the Dragon ===
This box set introduced gamers to the continent of Taladas, noted for having a large molten sea in its middle, and a nation of minotaurs modeled on the Roman Empire, with its own imperial family, senate, and gladiatorial games.

== Eberron ==
In 2003, Wizards of the Coast held a contest for fans to propose the most creative new setting, the reward being a publishing contract. Keith Baker's setting won, and with additional design by Wizards of the Coast's creative department, the Eberron campaign setting was released in 2004. Straying from the "standard" Western European flavor used in many other D&D settings such as Greyhawk and the Forgotten Realms, Eberron takes place in a world of pulp action and fantasy noir with steampunk influences, where the inhabitants make extensive use of magic in place of technology, or technology powered by magical energies. Fantasy versions of steam trains, airships, and even robots are commonplace, mostly replacing the traditional medieval trope of knights in shining armor.

== Exandria ==
Originally created by Matthew Mercer for his personal campaigns in 2012, Exandria is the world where the Critical Role web series is set and is a high fantasy setting, which moves away from the "harmful tropes in D&D" around monstrous races. In 2017, Green Ronin Publishing released a setting book written by Mercer and James Haeck, Critical Role: Tal'Dorei Campaign Setting, which focused on the continent of Tal'Dorei in Exandria, where the first Critical Role campaign with the adventuring group Vox Machina took place. One critic highlighted that this campaign has the "specific flavor of high fantasy drama" akin to the "Dragonlance or Forgotten Realms books". An updated edition, titled Tal'Dorei Campaign Setting Reborn (2022) from publisher Darrington Press, moves the timeline 20 years forward to the era of the second Critical Role campaign. Academic Emily Friedman, writing for Los Angeles Review of Books, noted designer and critic Alyssa Visscher's 2021 argument that Exandria "is this D&D gen's Forgotten Realms. It's so many folks' intro setting; a large section of the newer player base *knows* and is emotionally invested in it". Friedman commented, "if Visscher is right (and I believe she is), then Critical Role and other major actual plays are the primary sources today for D&D's narrative and world-building intellectual properties".

Exandria was first mentioned in an official Wizards of the Coast publication in the adventure book Baldur's Gate: Descent into Avernus (2019). In 2020, after Mercer had been working with Wizards of the Coast for about a year and a half on the project, Exandria officially became a part of Dungeons & Dragons through the release of the Explorer's Guide to Wildemount. This book focuses on the continent of Wildemount in Exandria, where the second Critical Role campaign takes place, and adds a new type of magic called dunamancy, which focuses on manipulating time and space. Wildemount was designed with an Eastern European influence – specifically, the Dwendalian Empire was inspired by 15th century Russia and Prussia, Xhorhas by 13th-century Romania, and the edges by 14th-century Spain. Critics have highlighted Wildemount specifically as breaking from traditional fantasy tropes.

A second collaboration book, Critical Role: Call of the Netherdeep, includes some setting information; the adventure heads from Xhorhas to the city of Ank'Harel on the continent of Marquet. From there, players will be drawn into the Netherdeep – "a terrifying cross between the Far Realm and the deep ocean". In 2022, the book was "the closest to cracking open Exandria's origins that Mercer has come to date. Call of the Netherdeep is steeped in the history of The Calamity, a cataclysmic event in which the Exandrian pantheon exploded into a civil war that put the entire world in peril".

== Forgotten Realms ==
Created by author and game designer Ed Greenwood as his personal campaign and detailed in a long series of articles in Dragon Magazine, Forgotten Realms became the most popular D&D setting from the late 1980s onwards and has been well received by both gamers and reviewers. Sean Patrick Fannon, author of The Fantasy Roleplaying Gamer's Bible, has praised the setting's scope and ambition and considered that it "may be the most widely played-in game setting in RPG history".

The Forgotten Realms is a high fantasy world – magic is powerful, legendary monsters are commonplace, and gods often intervene directly in mortal affairs. Players can indulge in several types of fantasy adventures, from straightforward hack-and-slash treasure hunting in dungeons to epic campaigns involving regional wars, cataclysms and direct contact with gods and extra-dimensional beings.

The lands of the Forgotten Realms are not all ruled by the human race: the setting's planet, Abeir-Toril, is shared by humans, dwarves, elves, goblins, orcs, dragons and other peoples and creatures. Technologically, the world resembles pre-industrial Earth of the 13th or 14th century. However, the strong presence of magic provides an additional element of power to the societies.

The main focus of the campaign is the region of Faerûn, the western part of a continent that was roughly modeled after the Eurasian continent on Earth. Faerûn was first detailed in the original Forgotten Realms Campaign Set, published in 1987 by TSR, and contains rough analogues of mythical versions of European, African and Middle Eastern cultures, as well as regions dominated by non-human races. Other areas include the Underdark (an underground realm dominated by evil elves), Maztica (inspired by pre-Columbian Mesoamerica), and Kara-Tur (based on the mythical Far East).

For D&D's 4th edition, the setting was reworked: the timeline advanced into the future where a major cataclysm caused by a conflict amongst gods caused the previously divided worlds Abeir and Toril to collide with several geographical areas changing place. In 2014, with the launch of the 5th edition, the world of Forgotten Realms was again returned to its previous, 3rd edition geography.

This campaign is currently officially supported by Wizards of the Coast and over the years has expanded into a variety of other media, including literature, comics and video games. The highly successful Baldur's Gate, Icewind Dale, and Neverwinter Nights series of video games are based on the Forgotten Realms, which is also the setting of a large number of novels, featuring, among others, the popular characters Drizzt Do'Urden, Artemis Entreri, and Elminster.

The Forgotten Realms are the default setting for most adventures released for the 5th edition of D&D, though the core rulebooks reference the wider multiverse.

=== Al-Qadim ===
Al-Qadim is a setting inspired by Arabian mythology and in particular the Thousand and One Nights, with genies, elemental wizards, holy assassins, and a land unified by belief in the power of Fate. The land, named Zakhara, is located near the southern border of the continent of Faerûn, the main landmass of the Realms. However, Al-Qadim appeared under its own label, and not the Forgotten Realms label, unlike Kara-Tur and Maztica. This campaign setting is no longer officially supported, but it is now regarded as part of the Forgotten Realms campaign setting as its setting is mentioned in some Forgotten Realms sourcebooks and novels.

=== Arcane Age ===
Unlike other subsettings, this product line was not separated by space, but by time, taking place in the distant past.

=== The Horde ===
Released as a box set, The Horde's subheading on its front cover reads "Barbarian Campaign Setting". It details a region known as the Endless Waste, which lies between Faerûn and Kara-Tur. The setting is modeled on medieval Mongolia (A Guidebook to the Endless Waste, page 9).

=== Kara-Tur ===
An oriental setting loosely based on mythical and medieval East and Southeast Asia, featuring advanced and mystical civilizations populated by martial warriors, samurais, ninjas, spirit folk and other fantastical creatures. It was introduced in the original Oriental Adventures rulebook published in the 1980s. It later became part of the Forgotten Realms and was eventually placed on the eastern edge of Toril. The lands of Kara-Tur are split between several peoples and kingdoms, the most powerful of which is Shou Lung, a sprawling empire (inspired by historical China) and arguably the largest nation in the Forgotten Realms.

=== Malatra: The Living Jungle ===
A lesser known setting located south of Shou Lung in Kara-Tur, Malatra is a massive plateau containing a dense jungle environment. Loosely based on pre-colonial Indochina, Malatra is cut off from the rest of the world by distance, geography and powerful magic. Different races and variants of races from Forgotten Realms, Kara-Tur, and Spelljammer inhabit the plateau, and there is little in the form of technology. True gods, money, and books are all unheard of in the setting, as it is intended to have a more primitive feel and stress heroism. Malatra was created as a Living Setting for Polyhedron magazine, and used in organized play at conventions. Most of the information from the setting can be found in Polyhedron magazine starting with issue #102, with a number of adventures being released every year. The setting started during second edition in 1995 and continued to release more adventures regularly into third edition through 2003. In 2007 one final adventure using the 3.5 rules was created for the organized play circuit.

=== Maztica ===
Maztica is a continent west of Faerûn that parallels Pre-Columbian Mesoamerica.

In the fourth edition of D&D, Maztica was no longer on Toril, but was shifted to Abeir. The fifth edition of the game reinstated the 3rd edition geography.

== Ghostwalk ==
The Ghostwalk setting consists of a single campaign book. The central locale for the Ghostwalk setting is a city called Manifest, a mausoleum city built atop a geological feature known as the Well of Souls, a gathering place for ghosts, unique as a place in which ghosts can cross over to the realm of the living.

== Greyhawk ==
The first published setting for D&D, created by D&D co-author Gary Gygax. Greyhawk is Gygax's original campaign, one which eventually turned into an official game supplement and was greatly expanded upon with many supplements throughout the 1970s and 1980s. Many of the setting's concepts were based on ideas generated during Gary Gygax's D&D gaming sessions. Several characters in the setting were also based on characters created by Gygax's gaming partners.

Oerth (the name of the world where Greyhawk campaigns take place) is a "standard" medieval fantasy world, similar in many ways to the Forgotten Realms setting, but overall darker in tone, closer to a sword and sorcery scenario. The first official edition of the campaign was published in 1980, although sections of it had appeared in articles published by the author.

The campaign itself began as a dungeon and then expanded into an entire continent (Oerik) and eventually other added areas. In general, Oerth is an action-packed world which seems to be gradually descending into savagery and chaos and continually on the verge of war. It is originally centered on the region of Flanaess, whose fictional history has parallels with that of ancient and medieval Europe – a powerful Oeridian Empire has pushed away barbarian tribes and has become a decadent, evil state, while smaller states, kingdoms and tribes compete for power amidst wildlands populated by monsters, magic and fantastical creatures.

Greyhawk was also the "default" setting for the 3rd edition of D&D, with deities from the setting being used as examples in the core rulebooks, and an organized play "living" campaign for the edition was set in Greyhawk. More recently, the 5th edition adventure book Ghosts of Saltmarsh is set in the Greyhawk setting.

In the 2024 revised edition of the 5th edition, Greyhawk was included in the Dungeon Master's Guide as a customisable default setting.

== Jakandor ==
Jakandor, released in 1998, is a self-contained "campaign arena" conceived by Jeff Grubb. Jakandor is an island divided between the native Charonti, a civilization that makes heavy use of magic (especially necromancy), and the Knorr, barbarians who despise the vile practice of magic and have been driven from a far-away homeland to Jakandor.

The setting was released in the form of three books, as part of the AD&D: Odyssey line. These books are:

- Jakandor, Island of War (February 1998 ISBN 0-7869-0371-6) detailed the Knorr barbarians and eastern side of Jakandor.
- Jakandor, Isle of Destiny (June 1998 ISBN 0-7869-1245-6) detailed the Charonti and western side of Jakandor.
- Jakandor, Land of Legend (November 1998 ISBN 0-7869-1246-4) has additional information and adventures for characters from both civilisations.

A novel written by Grubb, entitled Jakandor: Land of Destiny, was planned for January 1999 but not released.

== Kingdoms of Kalamar ==
A campaign setting designed and produced by Kenzer & Company. The Kalamar setting focuses mainly on six human sub-races on the world of Tellene and its creators pride themselves on grounding the fantasy setting in 'reality' by taking advantage of realistic looking geography and political structures. This campaign setting is no longer officially supported by Wizards of the Coast, but Kenzer & Company continues to use this setting for its own Hackmaster game.

== Lankhmar ==
TSR released a setting based on the Fafhrd and the Gray Mouser stories by Fritz Leiber. The corrupt city of Lankhmar on the planet Nehwon is the starting place of grand adventures filled with mystery and deceit. Though Lankhmar is no longer supported as a setting for Dungeons & Dragons, its rights are held by Goodman Games, who have released it as a setting for Dungeon Crawl Classics.

== Magic: The Gathering planes ==
The various planes from the Magic: The Gathering collectible card game were first adapted for Dungeons & Dragons in a series of free PDF releases called Plane Shift by James Wyatt, who worked on D&D for many years before moving over to Magic in 2014. Wyatt also writes the text for the series of Art of Magic: The Gathering coffee table books, which reprint illustrations from the cards with details for each plane's lore; the Plane Shift releases were created to allow players to use those books as campaign setting guides by providing the necessary rule adaptations. Between 2016 and 2018, six "Plane Shift" articles were released: Amonkhet, Dominaria, Innistrad, Ixalan, Kaladesh, and Zendikar, along with an Ixalan-set adventure. Plane Shift: Innistrad was released as a free PDF in 2016.

However, these articles are not considered official material for organized play. In 2017, Mike Mearls wrote: "It's basically a thing James does for fun, and we don't want to burden it with needing all the work required to make it official".

=== Ravnica ===
The positive response to the "Plane Shift" articles lead to the 2018 publication of Guildmasters' Guide to Ravnica, a full hardcover setting guide to the Magic setting of Ravnica, which first appeared in 2005. It is a high-magic world with a loose Slavic flavor, and features a single city which spans the entire planet and is controlled by ten competing guilds of different ideologies. Wyatt was the lead designer on Guildmasters' Guide to Ravnica (2018) and he said that "this book is, essentially, Plane Shift: Ravnica".

=== Theros ===
Theros is a setting inspired by Greek mythology and Roman mythology. The setting originated as part of a Magic: The Gathering block released in 2013. This plane was introduced to Dungeons & Dragons in the 5th Edition campaign setting book Mythic Odysseys of Theros (2020). Wyatt co-led the design with F. Wesley Schneider.

=== Strixhaven ===
The plane of Arcavios and its magical university Strixhaven were "created from scratch by the world-building team" for the 2021 Strixhaven: School of Mages Magic: The Gathering set. The university is divided into five colleges: Lorehold, Witherbloom, Prismari, Quandrix, and Silverquill; each college was founded by a different Elder Dragon. In June 2021, a crossover campaign book Strixhaven: A Curriculum of Chaos was released which introduces the setting to Dungeons & Dragons. CBR reported that "in the world of Magic: The Gathering, Strixhaven is the largest and most powerful magic academy in the multiverse [...]. Due to its relatively recent addition to the Magic: The Gathering universe, it's likely this Dungeons & Dragons adventure will significantly expand on the lore associated with the magic school". A preview of Strixhaven: A Curriculum of Chaos was available on June 8, alongside the launch of new playtest content titled Unearthed Arcana – Mages of Strixhaven.

=== Future plans ===
In 2020, Greg Tito, Wizards of the Coast Senior Communications Manager, confirmed that there would be more Dungeons & Dragons crossovers with Magic: The Gathering in the future, noting "there is a huge crossover between Magic players and D&D players" and since Wyatt has worked on both D&D and Magic, it is even more likely that there will be more crossovers.

== Mahasarpa ==
Mahasarpa is a South Asian-themed campaign setting featuring seven kingdoms that are the surviving remnants of a great kingdom brought down by its own arrogance. Mahasarpa was designed by James Wyatt, and was offered as a free web enhancement to the Oriental Adventures rulebook for D&D 3rd edition. Mahasarpa includes brief descriptions of the seven kingdoms, character options for the setting, new magic items, and new monsters.

== Mystara ==
Mystara is a campaign setting that evolved from the B and X series modules. The setting, as presented in the 1981 Expert Set, was a reworking of Tom Moldvay and Lawrence Schick's "Original Known World" OD&D home campaign which was played in Kent and Akron, Ohio from 1976 to 1979. This "Known World" served as the default campaign setting for the non-Advanced editions of D&D throughout the 1980s and 1990s. In 1986, the Blackmoor setting was retconned to exist in Mystara's distant past. Similarly to Forgotten Realms, Mystara was also designed as a "generic" high fantasy setting, but with very close real-world cultural parallels, a lack of AD&D races and monsters (no drow—their role is filled by Shadowelves, no half-elves or half-orcs since these were not character options in Basic D&D, no illithids since there were no psionics in BD&D, and no metallic dragons other than gold, since only gold dragons are found in BD&D), many varieties of PC catfolk (Rakastas), dogfolk (Lupins), and turtlefolk (Tortles) which model real-world pet breeds and turtle species, no Good–Evil axis of alignment (only Lawful–Chaotic), and light in tone (with in-world parallels of Magnum P.I., Fantasy Island, John Wayne, and other pop culture icons), and aimed at younger players. However, later supplements (such as the War Machine mass combat rules, Dominion rules, and Immortals rules) rivaled AD&D in complexity. Unlike other settings, Mystara had ascended immortal beings instead of gods, and extensive support for Immortals-level PC play.

The world map of Mystara is based on Christopher Scotese's Time-Life map of Jurassic earth. Most adventures take place in "The Known World", the southeastern corner of the Brun continent and adjacent isles, which includes a variegated patchwork of human and non-human realms: real-world analogues of medieval and renaissance European (e.g. Balkan Traladarans, French, Scottish, German, and Machiavellian Italian Glantrians, and Norse Northlanders, to name only a few), African (Egyptian analogues in Ylaruam and Thothia), Asian (Arabian and Central Asian Ylaruam, Indian Sind, and Mongolian Ethengar), Indigenous North American (the Atruaghin Clans), and Oceanian (the Hawaiʻian Makai of the Kingdom of Ierenedi) cultures, Dwarvish, Halfling, and Elvish realms (including Spanish "Flamenco Elves"), a wasteland populated by orcs and other humanoid races presented in a comedic light, and two large empires (one inspired by real-world Rome and Byzantium, and the other one ruled by one thousand 36th-level magic-users). The setting includes further oddities, such as the Red Steel/Savage Coast campaign where characters gain mutant powers due to a red poisonous dust which pervades that region, and a peculiar "hollow earth", "lost world" refugium with dinosaurs and primordial cultures (the Hollow World sub-setting).

In the mid-1990s, TSR's attention shifted towards the advanced edition of D&D. A version of the setting was released for AD&D 2nd edition, but support was sparse. Mystara is one of the settings mentioned in the core rulebooks of the 5th edition of D&D, launched in 2014.

=== Hollow World ===
Hollow World is a sub-setting for Mystara located on the inner surface contained within the world of Mystara, similar to the real world legends of the Hollow Earth. It is lit by a small, eternal red sun at the center of Mystara. The existence of the Hollow World is not, in general, known to the inhabitants of the outer world. The north and south poles are actually huge, subtly curving holes that allow passage between the outer and inner world, although it is a long, hard trek through a cold, unlit, stormy and anti-magic area. Explorers from either surface do not notice the transition until after it is already made, causing quite a shock for most.

The Hollow World was originally discovered by Ka the Preserver, an ancient Immortal who began life as a giant carnosaur, who, after finding it, decided to use the inner surface of the world as a refuge and preserve for creatures that were on the verge of becoming extinct in the ever-changing outer world. Characters from the surface world are severely limited by the magic used by the Immortals to preserve the stability of the various cultures. The requirements to learn magic are much higher in the Hollow World, and many spells are non-functional or unavailable. Several new player races are included: Beastmen, Brutemen, Kubbits, Krugel Orcs, and Malpheggi Lizardmen.

=== Red Steel/Savage Coast ===
The Savage Coast is part of the Mystara campaign setting. The area is a 2,000 mile long frontier coastline about 2,000 miles to the west of the Known World area of Mystara. Inhabited by pirates and colonists, the Savage Coast is under the Red Curse, which eventually kills its inhabitants by mutating them unless the metal cinnabryl is worn in contact with the body. This sub-setting is influenced by the historical Age of Exploration. The region was first sketched in X9: The Savage Coast (1985), but this sparse treatment was revised in the "Voyage of the Princess Ark" Dragon magazine fiction series by Bruce Heard, who filled in the empty wilderness, and retconned X9 to have taken place in the distant past. The setting was subsequently rebranded as the AD&D 2nd edition Red Steel product line (1994) and again as the Savage Coast Odyssey line (1996).

=== Thunder Rift ===
Thunder Rift is a subsetting created by Colin McComb in 1992 for the "basic" D&D product line, which was refreshed with the 1991 publication of a new boxed set for new players and the Dungeons & Dragons Rules Cyclopedia game book. The Rift, a small and isolated valley containing many common D&D races and monsters, is presented as a location for beginning game groups that could be gradually expanded by the DM. It is the setting for a series of introductory modules. Thunder Rift can be used as a self-contained setting, or be inserted in any existing game world, and was given no official placement. Thunder Rift designers later stated that they imagined placing the Rift either in northern Karameikos or on one of the other two continents of Mystara. Yet the module Escape from Thunder Rift referred to Mystara as one of "other worlds" (p. 2) reachable via a "dimensional pool" (whose function is that it "can be used to travel from one dimension to another"; p. 31) which implies that Thunder Rift is a different world and dimension from Mystara. In any case, as a product line, Thunder Rift was associated with Mystara, and this module transitioned players from the boxed set to the full Rules Cyclopedia and its expansive Mystara setting.

== Nentir Vale ==
Nentir Vale is the sample community provided as a default setting in the 4th edition Dungeon Master's Guide. Most sourcebooks refer to the cosmology this community exists in as simply "the D&D world" though this appears to be an informal term. The overall setting is one in which great empires of various races, including tieflings and dragonborn, have long ago or recently fallen.

Towns and other civilization centers are described as "points of light" in an otherwise dark age, with the DM encouraged by the guidebook to leave the rest of the world largely unplanned, vague and unpredictable. The deities presented in the 4th edition Dungeon Master's Guide are a combination of Greyhawk, Forgotten Realms and newly created gods. Portions of two continents, Nerath and Selduria, were mapped in 2011.

== Pelinore ==
Pelinore is a lesser-known D&D campaign setting that was developed by TSR's UK offices in its Imagine magazine.

Pelinore articles primarily focused on a major urban center, the City League, and the surrounding county. Articles in Imagine detailed small locations within the City League that could also be used in any setting, as they were almost generic in execution.

Imagine presented a portion of this campaign world with each new issue from issue #16, up until its cancellation at issue #30. After the cancellation of Imagine, the former assistant editor, Paul Cockburn, created Game Master Publications. This series of unofficial D&D modules was set in Pelinore with newly drawn maps and some renamed locations (e.g., the "County of Cerwyn" became "Caerns"). Some modules described places beyond the boundaries of the established setting. From issue GM4 onwards Game Master Publications returned to the use of the original names and even reprinted the official maps from Imagine. Game Master Publications was cancelled at issue GM5 in 1987.

== Planescape ==
A setting that crosses the numerous "planes of existence", as originally developed in the Manual of the Planes. The setting crossed Victorian era trappings with a pseudo-steampunk design and attitude. Planescape won acclaim on its unique visual aspects, products of artist Tony DiTerlizzi. The city of Sigil has appeared in the 3rd edition in the Planar Handbook and the Epic Level Handbook, in the 4th edition in Dungeon Master's Guide 2, and in the 5th edition Dungeon Master's Guide.

== Radiant Citadel ==
The Radiant Citadel is a city located in the Ethereal Plane founded by refugees from 27 separate worlds and still connected to 15 of those worlds as a hub. Introduced in Journeys through the Radiant Citadel, it is intended as a fantasy "melting pot" city, and the short adventures in the book each take place in a different one of the connected worlds.

== Ravenloft ==
=== Main ===
A gothic horror setting originally created by Tracy and Laura Hickman for their own game system, "the duo eventually caught the attention of D&D's original publishers. They were hired to adapt it into the First Edition of Advanced Dungeons & Dragons and it was released as Module I6: Ravenloft" in 1983 by TSR. It was expanded into an entire series of adventure modules and then further expanded into a campaign setting for the AD&D 2nd edition beginning in 1990 with the Realm of Terror boxed set. TSR also published a series of novels set in Ravenloft.

In 2001, shortly after the release of D&D 3rd edition, Wizards of the Coast licensed Ravenloft to White Wolf Publishing which published Ravenloft materials through its Sword & Sorcery Studios imprint, but rights returned to Wizards of the Coast in early 2006. In October 2006, Wizards of the Coast released Expedition to Castle Ravenloft, an expanded and updated version of the original module for D&D v3.5. In August 2010, Wizards of the Coast released the Castle Ravenloft Board Game.

The setting was revisited in 2016 with the release of the 5th edition adventure module Curse of Strahd, with the setting's original creators, Tracy & Laura Hickman, returning as writers. Van Richten's Guide To Ravenloft, a 5th edition Ravenloft campaign sourcebook, was released in 2021. Christian Hoffer, for ComicBook.com, highlighted that this sourcebook revises many of the setting's Domains of Dread. He wrote that "the revised domains are usually a better utilization of the ironic intent that flavors the immortal prisons of Ravenloft. The domains also now include a variety of different horror genres rather than a fixation on gothic horror. Finally, much of the misogynistic, colonialist, or racist elements have been purged out of this new iteration of Ravenloft".

=== Masque of the Red Death ===
A spin-off of Ravenloft set in a gaslamp fantasy rendition of 1890s Earth.

== Rokugan ==
When Wizards of the Coast published the latest edition of Oriental Adventures, it included Rokugan as the official "sample setting". Rokugan is best known for being the setting of the Legend of the Five Rings (L5R) themed games: the Legend of the Five Rings collectible card game and the Legend of the Five Rings Roleplaying Game, which are all published by The Alderac Entertainment Group (AEG). However, shortly after the publication of Oriental Adventures, AEG obtained all the publishing rights to all L5R properties. For a brief time, AEG published supplements that featured both L5R and D20 based mechanics. Development of all D20 based Rokugan material has ceased, as Oriental Adventures is now out of print, and AEG has decided to focus solely on L5R based supplements for the next edition of The L5R Roleplaying Game, and this campaign setting is no longer officially supported as a D&D setting. Legend of the Five Rings 4th Edition (not related to D&D 4th Edition) was released in 2010.

== Spelljammer ==
A setting based in "wildspace", a fantastical version of outer space based on classical notions of the universe in which magic-imbued ships interact with each other and locations in space, including campaign setting planets such as Forgotten Realms or Dragonlance, allowing for inter-campaign interaction. Throughout 3rd and 4th edition this campaign setting was not officially supported as a standalone campaign setting, but elements from the setting (such as spelljammer ships) were included in supplement materials. Spelljammer: Adventures in Space was released in 2022 as a sourcebook for 5th edition.

== Warcraft ==
The Warcraft campaign setting, based on the computer gaming franchise Warcraft, was a licensed series published by White Wolf Publishing via its Sword & Sorcery Studios imprint for the 3rd and 3.5 Editions of Dungeons & Dragons. Shannon Appelcline commented that "Warcraft: The Roleplaying Game (2003) was a rare product that actually carried Wizards of the Coast's 'Dungeons & Dragons' logo and as a result was a sourcebook, not a full game. When it was revamped as World of Warcraft: The Roleplaying Game (2005), it became OGL-based". Sword & Sorcery released their last book for setting in 2008. In 2011, World of Warcraft Community Manager "Bashiok" stated that these books sometimes diverge from the established canon of lore in the Warcraft video games, though some ideas originating in the RPG books have made their way into the official Warcraft canon.

At Gen Con 2026, Wizards of the Coast announced a new Universes Beyond program for licensed partnerships. This program is similar to Wizards of the Coast's Universes Beyond program for Magic: The Gathering. These Universes Beyond releases are part of the new seasonal structure for 5.5 Edition – the Season of Champions is headlined by the Dungeons & Dragons: World of Warcraft (November 2026) sourcebook, based on World of Warcraft.
