= Ajit George =

Indian-American non-profit director

Ajit A. George
- Occupations: Chief Operating Officer, Shanti Bhavan Children's Project; games writer
- Website: ajitageorge.com

Ajit George is an Indian-American tabletop role-playing game writer and nonprofit executive.

George is known in the gaming industry for his role as co-lead designer/author (with F. Wesley Schneider) of the Dungeons & Dragons adventure anthology Journeys through the Radiant Citadel (2022) which was nominated for the 2023 Nebula Award for Best Game Writing, the 2023 Diana Jones Award for Excellence in Gaming, and 2023 ENNIE Awards for Best Adventure and Best Product. In 2022, George was awarded the Diana Jones Award, an annual award for "Excellence in Gaming."

George is the Chief Operating Officer of Shanti Bhavan Children's Project based in Bangalore, India. The school, which was the focus of the 2017 Netflix documentary series Daughters of Destiny: The Journey of Shanti Bhavan, provides free education to socially disadvantaged children from the age of four until they graduate from college.

== Early years ==
George, the oldest son of Mariam and Abraham M. George, grew up in New Jersey, United States. The family was well-off and George attended good schools. George felt isolated at school, and used role-playing games to help him, saying, "as a brown kid growing up in a deeply white set of schools and communities, I felt alienated constantly and really, really had a hard time with it. It was very, very painful for me growing up. And role playing games were one of the few refuges along with books that I could find that gave me my own space and my own voice and to experiment."

== Career ==
=== Shanti Bhavan Children's Project ===
When George was 22, his father Abraham decided to return to India to create a residential school for children of the Dalit caste, India's poorest caste.

In 2007, George became the Director of Operations for Shanti Bhavan Children's Project. He was brought onto the team to help Shanti Bhavan deal with its financial crisis. George changed the financial structure of the organization, taking it from being funded privately to a 501(c)(3) organization. It is now supported by individual donations, corporate and non-governmental organization (NGO) partnerships, and grants.

In January 2024, George became the Chief Operating Officer for Shanti Bhavan. He oversees all domestic and international fundraising, volunteer and teacher recruitment, media relations, strategic partnerships, and the mentorship program at Shanti Bhavan Children's Project.

George is a board member of the Indian Institute of Journalism and New Media, a postgraduate school of journalism and media, founded in 2001 and based in Bangalore, India.

=== Writing and game design ===
George returned to the world of role-playing games, and found that little had changed in the field since his childhood, with almost no creative representation by people of color. After working as a contributing writer on Van Richten's Guide to Ravenloft (2021), George approached several publishing companies about increasing creative diversity. George and F. Wesley Schneider became co-lead designers and writers for Journeys through the Radiant Citadel (2022), the first official "anthology of D&D adventures to be written entirely by Black and brown authors" published by Wizards of the Coast, including an adventure by Mimi Mondal. The committee of the Diana Jones Award in 2022 highlighted that George "has been the first writer of Indian origin to write Indian-inspired material for a number of games, including Dungeons & Dragon's Van Richten’s Guide to Ravenloft". Journeys through the Radiant Citadel was nominated for the 2023 Nebula Award for Best Game Writing, the Diana Jones Award for Excellence in Gaming, and ENNIE Awards for Best Adventure and Best Product.

George has also written for a variety of indie game companies including Bully Pulpit, Thorny Games, and Monte Cook Games.

Along with being a writer, George is a diversity consultant, speaker, and activist in the gaming community. In 2016, George helped Gen Con expand its Industry Insider Speakers program. In 2019, he created a POC training and mentorship program that connects game industry experts with POC professionals new to the industry. George also organized and led the first POC networking event at Big Bad Con in 2019.

== Awards and nominations ==
| Year | Award | Category | Work | Result | Ref. |
|---|---|---|---|---|---|
| 2021 | Diana Jones Award | | —N/a | Nominated | |
| 2022 | Diana Jones Award | | —N/a | Won | |
| 2023 | Nebula Award | Best Game Writing | Journeys through the Radiant Citadel | Nominated | |
| 2023 | Diana Jones Award | | Journeys through the Radiant Citadel | Nominated | |
| 2023 | ENNIE Awards | Best Adventure | Journeys through the Radiant Citadel | Nominated | |
| 2023 | ENNIE Awards | Best Product | Journeys through the Radiant Citadel | Nominated | |

== Media ==
- George and Shanti Bhavan Children's Project were featured in the 2017 original Netflix documentary series Daughters of Destiny: The Journey of Shanti Bhavan, written, directed, and co-produced by Vanessa Roth.
- George presented at TEDxUNC in 2014, and at TEDxCollegeofWilliam&Mary in 2016.
- George presented Nebula Awards' first-ever award for "Outstanding Game Writing" in 2019.
