= Jakandor, Land of Legend =

1998 role-playing supplement

Cover art by Terese Nielsen

Jakandor, Land of Legend is a role-playing game supplement published by TSR for the second edition of Advanced Dungeons & Dragons. It is the third of three supplements about the Isle of Jakandor.

== Contents ==
The first sourcebook about Jakandor, Island of War, introduced the land of Jakandor, populated by two antagonistic societies: the barbarian Knorr, who have been exiled to this island by their patron deity for their sins, and the Charonti, a race of once mighty necromancers seeking to rediscover their past glory. The first book focused on the Knorr. The second book, Jakandor, Isle of Destiny, described the mortal enemies of the Knorr, the Charoni.

The third book in the trilogy, Jakandor, Land of Legend, presents a number of adventures that are designed to move towards a final battle between the two cultures. The book also includes a complete map of Jakandor — in the previous two books, only the parts relevant to each society were given. The setting uses the rules for the second edition of Dungeons & Dragons.

The book is unusual in that players can decide which side they wish to join, the Knorr or the Charoni.

== Publication history ==
In 1996, TSR started a new series of supplements for the second edition of AD&D titled "Odyssey". The first three outlined the Savage Coast setting. These were followed in 1997–98 by a trilogy of books about an island called Jakandor: Jakandor, Island of War (1997), Jakandor, Isle of Destiny (1998), and Jakandor, Land of Legend (1998). The third book, Land of Legend, is a 148-page softcover book designed by Dale Donovan, with cover art by Terese Nielsen, interior art by Rick Tucker and Todd Lockwood, and cartography by Rob Lazzaretti, Dennis Kauth and Dave "Diesel" La Force.

Although at least one more Jakandor book was originally planned, it was never developed because the focus of TSR and Wizards of the Coast turned to development of the third edition of D&D.

== Reception ==
The Brazilian magazine Coleção Dragão Brasil called the Jakandor series "one of the most innovative AD&D products of recent times." The editors noted that Land of Legend included tips for how to adapt the setting to a home campaign, but felt this was probably not possible because "it is difficult to include other characters on the island."

Writing for Dragon Slayer, Paladino noted that most D&D products to this time had been "always marked by Manichaeism — the Christian doctrine that preaches the eternal battle between Good and Evil. Adventurous heroes of Good fight monsters of Evil." But Paladino noted that the Jakandor series "is one of the few AD&D products without a clear distinction between Good and Evil." Although Land of Legend included rules for adapting the Jakandor setting to other campaigns, Paladino pointed out the unlikelihood of that happening because of the limited racial and class choices: "It doesn't bring much freedom of choice for players since only humans live [on Jakandor] — and each side has severe class restrictions." Paladino concluded by giving the series an excellent rating of 6 out of 6, saying, "Jakandor is remarkable for its conflict between barbarian and civilized, brute force against magic... and no villains. No good or bad side, right or wrong. Something very, very rare in the entire history of D&D.

== Reviews ==
- Casus Belli #118
