= Dale Donovan =

American game designer

- Occupation: Game designer

Dale A. Donovan is a game designer who has worked primarily on role-playing games.

== Career ==
Dale Donovan began working in the hobby-gaming industry in 1989. A past editor of Dragon magazine, Donovan worked for TSR, Inc., Wizards of the Coast, and Hasbro for more than 12 years, during which time he had been an editor of Dragon magazine, spent four years on the Forgotten Realms campaign setting team, had a stint as a managing editor, and did work as a writer or editor on every roleplaying game line produced by the company during his tenure. He went freelance in 2002, and has worked for Green Ronin, Upper Deck, White Wolf/Sword & Sorcery, Sovereign Press, Steve Jackson Games, Guardians of Order, and the Valar Project, among others.

== Works ==
His Dungeons & Dragons design work has included Monstrous Compendium Spelljammer Appendix (1990), Monstrous Compendium Forgotten Realms Appendix II (1991), Unsung Heroes (1992), Player's Option: Skills & Powers (1995), Planes of Conflict (1995), Dark Sun Campaign Setting, Expanded and Revised (1995), Jakandor, Island of War (1997), Children of the Night: Ghosts (1997), Cult of the Dragon (1998), Jakandor, Land of Legend (1998), and Jakandor, Isle of Destiny (1998).
