= Shanti Bhavan =

Non-profit organisation based in Bangalore, India

Shanti Bhavan Children's Project
- Founded: August 1997
- Founder: Abraham George
- Type: 501(c)(3)
- Purpose: Creating social mobility in lowest caste communities
- Location: Bangalore, India
- Region served: Baliganapalli, Tamil Nadu
- Method: Education of Dalit children
- Key people: Abraham George - Founder and Chief Executive Officer; Ajit George - Chief Operating Officer; Urmila Michael - Chief Administrative Officer
- Website: shantibhavanchildren.org

The Shanti Bhavan Children's Project is a U.S. 501(c)(3) and India 80-G non-profit organisation based in Bangalore Karnataka, India, that operates a tuition-free, pre-K-12 residential school in Baliganapalli, Tamil Nadu for Dalit children. Shanti Bhavan is accredited by the Council for the Indian School Certificate Examinations (CISCE), and administers the ICSE and ISC exams during students' 10th and 12th grades. Due to caste-based discrimination, the students come from impoverished backgrounds. As of 2017, enrollment was about 300 students.

== History ==
The school was founded by Dr Abraham George, an Indian-American businessman and philanthropist. After serving in the Indian Army, Dr. George attended NYU's Stern School of Business and began his own company, Multinational Computer Models Inc. In 1995, he began the non-profit organisation The George Foundation. Shanti Bhavan was established in August 1997 as a project of The George Foundation to help economically and socially disadvantaged children, mostly Dalit, in rural India - specifically in the Tamil Nadu, Andhra Pradesh, and Karnataka regions.

In 2008, due to the 2008 financial crisis, Shanti Bhavan underwent a financial crisis of its own. With the help of current Chief Operating Officer, Ajit George, Shanti Bhavan Children’s Project moved from a privately funded institution to a mixed model of individual donations, corporate and NGO partnerships, and grants. On September 10, 2008, Shanti Bhavan separated from The George Foundation and became a non-profit organization run under the Shanti Bhavan Educational Trust.

== Praise and criticism ==
The May 2009 newsletter of the Global Organization for People of Indian Origin praised Shanti Bhavan for being "a safe and caring home for the children, offering food, clothing, medical care, and all their necessities, free of charge" and "opening up professional career paths that would normally be denied to this segment of the population." In June 2009, Sriram Srinivasan for Outlook (Indian magazine) praised the school's goal to "give world-class education to its students so that these children of sewer cleaners, bonded labourers and masons can become society leaders as lawyers, environmentalists and astronauts."

Shanti Bhavan faced scrutiny after the release of Daughters of Destiny (TV series), an in-depth Netflix ethnography about the school conducted by social worker Vanessa Roth. In 2017, Mike Hale for The New York Times criticized Shanti Bhavan for burdening young children with the expectation to pull their families out of poverty, which "puts tremendous pressure" on students through "crushing expectations, guilt, resentment (only one child per family can be admitted), and generational and cultural standoffs." Similarly, in 2017, Jenna Marotta for Vogue pointed out that, "Shanti Bhavan students face a staggering amount of pressure. At age 4, they are separated from their parents, and only one child per family is admitted."

== Method ==
The school takes in children as young as four years old whose families are below poverty level. Shanti Bhavan financially supports them throughout their years at the school as well as through college, providing 17 years of support education.

== Media ==
Shanti Bhavan featured in the documentary The Backward Class (2014), and the Netflix documentary series Daughters of Destiny: The Journey of Shanti Bhavan (2017), written, directed, and co-produced by Vanessa Roth.

In 2014, Shanti Bhavan student Visali was honoured as one of Glamour’s Women of the Year. In 2016, Shanti Bhavan student Keerthi was profiled in Glamour’s The Girl Project.

== Partners and programs ==
The organization has a volunteer program which employs volunteer educators from some educational and non-profit organizations such as ASTEP (Artists Striving to End Poverty), and She's the First to teach academic and non-academic subjects.

== Other references ==
- Thomas Friedman (2007). "The Unflat World". The World Is Flat 3.0: A Brief History of the Twenty-first Century. Picador. p. 641. ISBN 978-0-312-42507-4.
