= Journeys through the Radiant Citadel =

Dungeons & Dragons module

- The standard print cover, by Evyn Fong, which features the Dyn Singh night market that can be reached by journeying through the Radiant Citadel.
- Rules required: Dungeons & Dragons, 5th edition
- Character levels: 1-14
- Campaign setting: Setting neutral
- Lead designers: Ajit A. George, F. Wesley Schneider
- Authors: Justice Ramin Arman, Dominique Dickey, Ajit A. George, Basheer Ghouse, Alastor Guzman, D. Fox Harrell, T.K. Johnson, Felice Tzehuei Kuan, Surena Marie, Mimi Mondal, Mario Ortegón, Miyuki Jane Pinckard, Pam Punzalan, Erin Roberts, Terry H. Romero, Stephanie Yoon
- First published: July 19, 2022
- Pages: 224
- ISBN: 978-0-7869-6799-5

Journeys through the Radiant Citadel is an adventure anthology for the 5th edition of the Dungeons & Dragons fantasy role-playing game. Each adventure was created by an author of color. Additionally, this book introduces a new location within the Ethereal Plane which acts as a hub city for the various adventures. In 2023, the sourcebook was nominated for the Nebula Award for Best Game Writing and won the Silver ENNIE Award for Best Adventure.

== Summary ==
Journeys through the Radiant Citadel is an anthology of one-shot adventure modules where the Radiant Citadel acts as a central hub and starting point for each adventure. Radiant Citadel is a city that was established in the ethereal plane by 27 great civilizations ages ago before it was forgotten, and then, 250 years ago, descendants from 15 of those civilizations reestablished it. The city itself "is carved from a massive fossil of a seemingly extinct creature that nobody in the multiverse has ever seen". The concord jewels surrounding the city act as gateways to the founding civilizations in the Material Plane which are new lands in Dungeons & Dragons; the jewels also act as portals for the various adventures. Each of the original founders came from a different location, but twelve of their concord jewels have been lost.

Gizmodo highlighted that the missing jewels allow the Dungeon Master to develop their own connections. Additionally, "there are suggestions written at the beginning of every adventure to not only allow you to port between the Citadel and the various settings described in each chapter, but also between any individual adventure and the material world of your own game".

=== Adventures ===
The adventure themes vary widely from comedic to political intrigue to horror and mystery. Each adventure's region includes a gazetteer. The adventures, in the order of presentation, are:

- Salted Legacy (level 1) by Surena Marie
- Written In Blood (level 3) by Erin Roberts
- The Fiend of Hollow Mine (level 4) by Mario Ortegón
- Wages of Vice (level 5) by TK Johnson
- Sins of Our Elders (level 6) by Stephanie Yoon
- Gold for Fools and Princes (level 7) by Dominique Dickey
- Trail of Destruction (level 8) by Alastor Guzman
- In the Mists of Manivarsha (level 9) by Mimi Mondal
- Between Tangled Roots (level 10) by Pam Punzalan
- Shadow of the Sun (level 11) by Justice Ramin Arman
- The Nightsea's Succor (level 12) by D. Fox Harrell
- Buried Dynasty (level 13) by Felice Tzehuei Kuan
- Orchids of the Invisible Mountain (level 14) by Terry Hope Romero

== Publication history ==
The adventure module was originally scheduled for released June 21, 2022, but due to "domestic production issues" the release was delayed to July 19. The book is also available as a digital product through Wizards of the Coast licensees such as D&D Beyond, Fantasy Grounds, and Roll20.

=== Development ===
The project was conceived by Ajit George, a writer on Van Richten's Guide to Ravenloft (2021), who pitched it to Jeremy Crawford, D&D's Lead Rules Designer, and Wes Schneider, a Senior Game Designer. George and Schneider became the book's co-lead designers and by September 2020, they had assembled a team; the entire creative team included over fifty people of color. In an interview with the Los Angeles Review of Books, George commented that the development process was "very collaborative" and used techniques such as co-working sessions, shared boards, and peer-review rounds. While each section was primarily written "by one person", the process "had many collaborators, including various editors, rules developers, and consultants".

The eponymous Radiant Citadel was designed to be a vibrant, melting pot city that serves as a place of respite for the players instead of a more crime or combat focused city. George highlighted that the Radiant Citadal "is like a fantasy in New York City. All of these different cultures have come here for different reasons, under different struggles, in complex circumstances, and in many cases, as refugees". George stated that he was "inspired by his knowledge of Indian rock-cut architecture" for the visual design of the Citadel itself.

Each adventure's realm is new, but they are also designed to be portable to pre-existing or homebrew campaign settings. Erin Roberts, writer of the Written In Blood adventure, highlighted that when creating the realm of Godsbreath she was inspired by "the Black experience in the southern United States" and her "family's own past and legacy in Mississippi and Florida and Georgia". Roberts said that her "Black Southern Gothic horror" adventure is darker in tone than other adventures in the anthology – "it has a lot of the essence of the community and the joy, but without some of the oppression that you see in some of those works ... It's still got that southern vibe of good homes and good food and good community, and some creepiness in the corner".

==== Art direction ====
The alternate print cover, by Sija Hong, represents real-world cultures which are included in the various adventures.

Journeys through the Radiant Citadel was released with two cover options. Both Gizmodo and the Fandomentals highlighted that "this is the first time both covers have been drawn by women of color". The standard edition's cover art is by Evyn Fong, and it features the Dyn Singh Night Market in Siabsungkoh, one of the regions reachable through the Radiant Citadel. Kate Irwin, principal art director, said that the focus of the cover is the blue flying creature, the wynling – "but you can lose yourself in the market itself as you notice the charming interactions among the peoples". This cover reflects the various experiences in the book. The alternate art cover edition by Sija Hong was released only to local game stores. This cover incorporates many of the aspects of the book's setting such as the Dawn Incarnates and the Radiant Citadel. Irwin commented that the alternate cover reflects "the whole anthology. It starts with the Citadel but there are also creatures, plants and gems worked into the design that are important to real-world cultures represented in the individual stories".

On the book's interior art, Irwin explained that the art order "starts with the writer, goes through the game design lead, then the art director, and to the artists; "one of the most important" aspects of her job is "the match-making between art order and artist". Wizards of the Coast's Art Director Emi Tanji and Irwin highlighted the new creators that they used for this book; Tanji said that it was "exciting" to see "creators who brought new points of views and inspiring stories". Irwin commented that using new artists for this book was also one of biggest risk they took – "we don't know if the artist is good with deadlines, if they take direction and are professional or if the quality of their portfolio is really what they will deliver. [...] Happily, everyone was awesome and some really went beyond with their work".

=== Marketing ===
Wizards of the Coast released the first chapter of Journeys through the Radiant Citadel on D&D Beyond as an early preview on June 21, 2022. It was a limited time promotion available only to registered D&D Beyond users between June 21 and June 28.

== Reception ==
=== Pre-release ===
Linda Codega, for Gizmodo, highlighted that creative team included "over fifty people of color". Codega stated that "this groundbreaking achievement surpasses the inclusion efforts of any previous Dungeons & Dragons book, and is a clear indicator of the commitment that [Ajit George] and [Wes Schneider] had to making sure that Radiant Citadel was unique not just for the breadth of adventures it would present, but for the diversity of ideas that would be apparent in the book. When you provide space for people of many cultures to create a multi-cultural book, you will get something that is so much more than the sum of its parts. Much like the Radiant Citadel itself".

James Grebey, for SyFy Wire, wrote that the book "is an anthology of adventures set in diverse new lands — and for the first time in the roleplaying game's history, the book's creators are diverse as well. [...] Viewed as part of the nearly 50-year-old game's recent push towards inclusivity and representation, Journeys through the Radiant Citadel is a natural and frankly overdue development (even if it will no doubt anger those who go off on tirades about 'wokeness'). But Journeys through the Radiant Citadel's diverse cast of creators is far more than just a welcome statistic, as the adventures contained in the book's pages promise to be new and exciting in part because they're drawing from experiences that are outside that of the historical D&D writer's".

=== Critical reception ===
In Publishers Weekly's "Best-selling Books Week Ending July 29, 2022", Journeys through the Radiant Citadel was #2 in "Hardcover Nonfiction" with 7,123 units sold. In USA Today's "Best-Selling Books List for July 24, 2022", Journeys through the Radiant Citadel was #87. Journeys through the Radiant Citadel was nominated for the Nebula Award for Best Game Writing in March 2023. The nomination included the names of not only lead designers George and Schneider, and publisher Wizards of the Coast, but all contributing authors as well. In June 2023, Journeys through the Radiant Citadel was nominated for the Diana Jones Award for Excellence in Gaming. Journeys through the Radiant Citadel won the 2023 Silver ENNIE Award for Best Adventure and was nominated for Best Product.

Samantha Nelson, for Polygon, described the setting as "dripping with a Gene Roddenberry-inspired feel". Nelson commented that "the tone and the stakes" of the adventures wildly vary – "having writers from historically marginalized groups also means the adventures avoid the tropes of more traditional D&D adventures [...] Along with its emphasis on racial and cultural diversity, Radiant Citadel also features queer romance, numerous nonbinary characters, and a prominent NPC with a prosthetic arm". Nelson wrote that she "was particularly impressed with how many of the adventures provide respectful ways for players to enjoy classic adventure tropes and settings, while simultaneously creating action-packed storylines and fully developed characters. [...] Journeys Through the Radiant Citadel shows the kind of explosive creativity that can come by bringing new voices to the game". She also highlighted that each adventure receives a lot of guidance on setting such as a gazetteer and a pronunciation guide along with civilization details such as "ideas for having PCs come from each civilization" and "suggestions for where on the map they might be if you want to add them to Eberron, the Forgotten Realms, and even Mystara, which hasn't received much attention since 3rd edition".

Jonathan Bolding, for PC Gamer, wrote that Journeys through the Radiant Citadel is ideal for online gaming groups – "the nature of the one-off scenarios lets you more simply add or drop a player from week to week when someone doesn't show up for game time, or run well with a larger rotating cast of players". Bolding commented that each adventure has primary plots which "resolve in four to six hours" of play and "with digital access to maps" online groups are positioned for "success". Bolding highlighted that the book is "notable as the first book of adventures written entirely by Black and brown writers drawing from their own cultures and backgrounds to create worlds with a richness unlike others made previously in D&D. That design ethos led to some really rich and inspired settings, drawing from cultures in Central America, South and East Asia, the Caribbean, and more. What you want when world-hopping is strong hooks, and this is a book with strong hooks indeed".

Scott Baird, for Screen Rant, commented that the Radiant Citadel itself can be used as a campaign hub if a Dungeon Master wishes to string together the various one-shot adventures. Baird wrote that there is a chapter "fleshing out" the Radiant Citadel including "its citizens and the different facilities players can use"; the Radiant Citadel has "at least a dozen archmages, as well as twenty mages", whom could open portals and give the Dungeon Master a framework via a NPC patron who "as a person of authority can assign missions and help guide campaign progression". Baird wrote that "each of the lands visited in the adventures also has a gazetteer outlining the region, allowing them to be expanded for use in further campaigns. [...] The fact that the Radiant Citadel is connected to many worlds on the Prime Material Plane means characters can come from all of the D&D campaign worlds, allowing for an incredibly diverse group of character types that won't feel out of place". Baird highlighted that of the various Dungeons & Dragons adventure anthology books, Journeys through the Radiant Citadel "is best designed for stitching different adventures together" and that the "Radiant Citadel can also be connected to standalone adventures" from other sourcebooks so "Journeys through the Radiant Citadel could be the perfect framework for a tapestry of diverse and exciting adventures".

Noelle Corbett, for CBR, wrote that "this book is a product of long push to amplify a wider array of voices everywhere, including at the tabletop. Journeys Through the Radiant Citadel, when run well, offers an excellent opportunity to explore and experience other cultures and mythologies, and the book has some good advice for how to balance gameplay and sensitivity that's universally useful for all manner of D&D adventures". Corbett highlighted the "Thoughtful Introductions" section in the first chapter – she called it a "brief but vital section" as it "implores DMs and players to think about how they role-play and portray different groups, particularly in terms of descriptions. [...] Though running these new adventures (and those inspired by the book) present some additional challenges and things for DMs and players to be mindful of, the book is ultimately a celebration of diversity that is meant to be shared and enjoyed. The advice laid out is important to follow and helpful for those who want to thoughtfully explore this rich world or introduce more diversity into their own adventures".
