= Daughters of Destiny (TV series) =

2017 documentary series on Netflix

- Genre: Documentary
- Created by: Vanessa Roth
- Starring: Shilpa Anthony Raj; Abraham George; Ajit George
- Country of origin: United States
- Original language: English
- No. of seasons: 1
- No. of episodes: 4

Production
- Running time: 56-65 min.

Original release
- Network: Netflix
- Release: July 28, 2017

Daughters of Destiny is a 2017 English-language original Netflix documentary series created by Oscar-winning filmmaker Vanessa Roth. It follows a group of disadvantaged children in rural India enrolled in the Shanti Bhavan residential school located in Tamil Nadu, India.

== Premise ==
Daughters of Destiny is shot over seven years, and follows a group of girls from rural India who are denied education because of their caste.

== Cast ==
- Shilpa Anthony Raj
- Thenmozhi
- Manjula
- Preetha Narayanan
- Karthika Annamalai
- Abraham George
- Ajit George
- Mariam George

== Release and reception ==
It was released on July 28, 2017 on Netflix streaming.

Julie Raeside from The Guardian wrote that "The actions of one man have undoubtedly transformed the lives of hundreds of seriously disadvantaged children and their families. If that isn’t worth celebrating in this glorious fashion, then I don’t know what is". Mike Hale of The New York Times wrote that "For every instance of success, there are two or three scenes that are problematic at best — family strife, hopelessness, promise unfulfilled. “Daughters of Destiny” can and will be used as a promotional tool for the Shanti Bhavan project, but it’s to Ms. Roth’s credit that it sometimes feels like the opposite".
