= Mary J. Blige's My Life =

- Promotional poster
- Directed by: Vanessa Roth
- Produced by: Ashaunna K. Ayars; Q. Nicole Jackson
- Starring: Mary J. Blige; Sean Combs; Taraji P. Henson; Alicia Keys
- Cinematography: Kalilah Robinson
- Edited by: Yvette M. Amirian; Parris Patton
- Music by: Mervyn Warren
- Production companies: Amazon Studios; Entertainment One; Creature Films; Blue Butterfly
- Distributed by: Amazon Studios
- Release dates: June 23, 2021 (New York City premiere); June 25, 2021
- Running time: 82 minutes
- Country: United States
- Language: English

Mary J. Blige's My Life is a 2021 American documentary film about the musical career of American recording artist Mary J. Blige directed by Vanessa Roth. Commemorating the 25th anniversary of her 1994 studio album My Life, the film was released on June 25, 2021, on Amazon Prime Video.

== Summary ==
My Life revisits the early life and career of Mary J. Blige, with a focus on her 1994 studio album of the same name. The film features appearances by Andre Harrell, Blige's sisters, the My Life songwriters, Sean Combs, Method Man, Alicia Keys, Tyler Perry, and Nas, as well as footage of Blige performing the album live for the first time during its 25th anniversary in 2019.

== Production ==
In December 2019, Amazon Studios and Entertainment One announced a documentary film on Mary J. Blige. The film was produced by Amazon Studios in collaboration with Blige's production company Blue Butterfly. It was directed by Vanessa Roth, with Blige serving as executive producer. The film also features music composed by Mervyn Warren.

== Release ==
On June 23, 2021, the film received its world premiere at the Jazz at Lincoln Center in New York City. It was made available digitally on-demand through streaming platform Amazon Prime Video on June 25, 2021. A ballad by Mary J. Blige titled "Hourglass", co-written by Teddy Riley, Andy Murray, Benjamin Wright, and Romans, was released in conjunction with the film.

== Reception ==
The film received mixed reviews from critics. On the review aggregator website Rotten Tomatoes, 60% of 15 critics' reviews are positive, with an average rating of 5.6/10. Metacritic, which uses a weighted average, assigned the film a score of 56 out of 100, based on 4 critics, indicating "mixed or average" reviews.

Johnny Loftus of Decider stated that it "celebrates the lasting influence of an incredible album" while also highlighting "the singer and songwriter’s profound struggle for wellness". Writing for the Los Angeles Times, Michael Ordona praised the film for "its fan testimonials of the album’s impact and Blige’s emotional recollections of the songs' roots." Robert Daniels of RogerEbert.com described the film as "fortuitously (providing) a love letter to Blige’s fans that teems with the same truthful message as the singer's best music". In a review for Variety, Andrew Barker wrote that "as a fan-centric retrospective, (the film) hits plenty of the right notes; but as a chance to more thoroughly explore a complicated, still-influential landmark, it never digs quite deeply enough."
