= Ruins (comics) =

Comic book series

- Cover to Ruins #1 - Men on Fire, art by Terese Nielsen

Publication information
- Publisher: Marvel Comics
- Schedule: Monthly
- Format: Limited series
- Genre: Superhero
- Publication date: August 1, 1995 – September 1, 1995
- No. of issues: 2
- Main character: Phil Sheldon

Creative team
- Written by: Warren Ellis
- Artist(s): Terese Nielsen; Cliff Nielsen; Chris Moeller (issue #2, last 17 pages only)
- Letterer: Jonathan Babcock
- Colorist(s): Terese Nielsen; Cliff Nielsen; Chris Moeller (issue #2, last 17 pages only)
- Editor(s): Tom Daning; Marie Javins; Carl Potts; Polly Watson

Ruins is a two-issue comic book miniseries, written by Warren Ellis with painted artwork by Terese Nielsen, Cliff Nielsen (her husband at the time) and Chris Moeller, who took over for the last 17 pages of the second issue.

The series, conceived by Ellis as a parody of the Marvels series by Kurt Busiek and Alex Ross, is set in a dystopian version of the Marvel Universe. Like Marvels, the comic features reporter Phil Sheldon as the main character and was published in prestige format, with fully painted artwork and acetate covers, further creating the impression that it is a more twisted companion piece.

In the Marvel Multiverse, the Earth of the Ruins universe is listed as Earth-9591.

== Plot ==
=== Book One: "Men on Fire" ===
Former Daily Bugle reporter Phil Sheldon explores a dystopian version of the Marvel Universe where in his own words "everything that can go wrong will go wrong." In this world, the experiments and accidents which led to the creation of superheroes on Earth-616 instead resulted in horrible deformities and painful deaths. Sheldon tours the country, investigating the aftermath of these events and researching a book about the strange phenomena to prove that the world has taken a wrong turn somewhere.

In this reality, the Avengers were a radical secessionist rebel group from California rebelling against an oppressive United States government led by 'President X'. Sheldon witnesses the destruction of the last Avengers Quinjet with a Patriot missile, killing Captain America, Ant-Man, the Wasp, and Iron Man. He encounters a decaying alcoholic Wolverine, whose flesh is slowly falling off due to the toxicity of his adamantium skeleton.

Sheldon proceeds to a Kree internment camp in Nevada, situated on a nuclear test site, where the last survivors of a Kree invasion fleet are slowly dying of cancer. Sheldon interviews Mar-Vell, one of the Kree prisoners, who tells him why their invasion failed: the Kree had encountered the Silver Surfer (who had gone mad and torn open his own chest in a futile attempt to experience respiration again). The Power Cosmic emanating from the Surfer's body disabled the Kree's cloaking devices and interfered with their scanners, allowing humanity to detect their ships and prevent the Kree fleet from detecting a nuclear barrage which destroyed 90% of their warships.

After his interview with Mar-Vell, Sheldon goes to Washington, D.C. He meets government agent Nick Fury, who attacks and almost shoots him, insisting that he 'proved he was clean' and claiming that Captain America introduced him to cannibalism. They are interrupted by Jean Grey, a prostitute, who offers herself to the two men for $20. Fury murders her on the spot before shooting himself. After his encounter with Fury, Sheldon visits Chicago and interviews Rick Jones, a morphine addict living with fellow addict Marlo Chandler, who tells the story of when Bruce Banner saved him from a Gamma Bomb blast — the blast transformed Bruce into a monstrous mass of tumors. Leaving the apartment, Sheldon trips over the corpse of the Punisher in the snow. Sheldon begs on his knees to be allowed to show the world how this state of affairs came to pass.

=== Book Two: "Women in Flight" ===
Sheldon is seated on a plane next to Raven Darkhölme, who has developed dissociative identity disorder from assuming too many different identities through her shape-shifting abilities. Having neglected to take her prescribed pills, Raven begins shape-shifting uncontrollably and dies of an aneurysm. When the plane lands, government agents take her body away while a protest against President X's government is underway. An agent bumps into a hippie named Max Eisenhardt, damaging a magnetic dampening device that he carries to nullify his powers, which causes all metal objects nearby to attach to him, killing him and several others and inflicting massive damage to the airport and plane.

Later, Sheldon visits a special prison in Texas run by Wilson Fisk which houses many mutants. Scott Summers was blinded in order to control his optic beams, Kitty Pryde died after attempting to phase through the bars of her cell only to become stuck, Kurt Wagner is self-cannibalizing his own tail, and Pietro Maximoff has had his limbs amputated to prevent him from using his superhuman speed. Fisk informs Sheldon that the only reason he was allowed to see the prison is because President X knows he is dying and wants to grant a dying man his wish.

Sheldon visits a carnival where St. John Blaze performs and commits suicide by setting his face on fire. Sheldon interviews Ben Grimm, who describes the deaths of Reed Richards, Susan and Johnny Storm, and Victor von Doom when their spaceship flew through a cloud of cosmic radiation; Ben had refused to pilot the ship due to safety concerns, so Reed hired Victor instead. Sheldon decides to begin writing his book, which he will title Marvels. However, he discovers that he has run out of the medication he has been taking; he has been infected with a virus passed on to him by his former Daily Bugle co-worker Peter Parker, caused by a radioactive spider that Peter experimented on that resulted in an infectious rash developing over his entire body. The virus kills Sheldon, and he is ignored by passersby as his notes scatter in the wind.

== Characters ==
Throughout the story, there are breaks within scenes that briefly describe the lives of other would-be Marvels. Beaubier twins Jeanne-Marie and Jean-Paul are homeless and fused together by their elbows; Jeanne-Marie is unaware that her brother is dead.

- Amora / Enchantress: A porn star accused of killing her producer with "magic".
- Bruce Banner / Hulk
- Bucky Barnes: A member of a fascist, cannibalistic militia from Oklahoma who is arrested alongside his accomplices Victor Creed and Jack Monroe.
- Clint Barton / Hawkeye: An Avenger who is shot at point-blank range by a Californian military advisor on Haight Street.
- Donald Blake: A cult leader who believes he can channel the entity Thor through his body after becoming addicted to fly-agaric mushrooms.
- Johnny "Saint John" Blaze
- Brunnhilde / Valkyrie: Briefly glimpsed by Sheldon from an airplane window, mounted on her winged horse, Aragorn.
- Frank Castle / Punisher
- Marlo Chandler
- Victor Creed: A member of a fascist, cannibalistic militia from Oklahoma who is arrested alongside his accomplices Barnes and Jack Monroe.
- Raven Darkhölme
- Deathlok
- Zelda DuBois / Princess Python: A circus performer who performs illegal acts with a python.
- Max Eisenhardt
- Wilson Fisk: The warden of a prison for mutants in Texas.
- Emma Frost: The high priestess and manager of the Church of the Next Generation, through which she legally adopts her followers' children and subjects them to surgeries to awaken their "psychic abilities".
- Nick Fury
- Galactus, who is thought to have been a god by the media, is found dead near Mars.
- Jean Grey: A young prostitute in Washington, D.C. She offers sexual services in exchange for money to both Fury and Sheldon—the former of whom kills Grey.
- Ben Grimm
- Daimon Hellstrom: A newborn whose mother claims he is the messiah.
- Rick Jones
- Logan / Wolverine
- Mar-Vell
- Pietro Maximoff / Quicksilver: An inmate at Fisk's prison who had his arms and legs amputated to prevent him from using his super-speed.
- Wanda Maximoff-Lehnsherr / Scarlet Witch: A former Avenger who betrayed the team by turning state's evidence against them in exchange for government protection.
- Namor McKenzie: Sheldon had a photo of him alongside the notes for his book.
- Jack Monroe: A member of a member of fascist, cannibalistic militia from Oklahoma who is arrested alongside his accomplices Barnes and Creed.
- Matt Murdock: A child who died after a crashing truck caused radioactive material to strike him in the face.
- Peter Parker
- Kitty Pryde
- Hank Pym / Giant-Man
- Norrin Radd / Silver Surfer
- Reed Richards
- Steve Rogers / Captain America
- Tony Stark / Man in the Iron Mask
- Johnny Storm
- Sue Storm
- Stephen Strange / Doctor Strange: A founding member of the Avengers who is missing.
- Scott Summers
- T'Challa is imprisoned due to his affiliation with the Black Panther Party.
- Janet van Dyne / Wasp
- Victor von Doom
- Kurt Wagner / Nightcrawler
- Warren Worthington III: A mutant with large, feathered wings on his back who serves under President X in exchange for keeping his mutant nature a secret.
- Charles Xavier / President X: The President of the United States of America. After being elected, he relocated the White House to Westchester County, leaving Washington, D.C. to fall into ruin and corruption; initiated the Genoshan Police Action; and established a prison in Texas where mutants were held behind iron bars—some having their bodies forcibly deformed in horrific ways in an attempt to control their mutations "for [their] own good". Xavier would often visit this prison, sometimes merely observing the prisoners with sadness, and at other times screaming obscenities at them.

== Publication history ==
=== Issues ===
Issue	Title	Publication date	Ref.
#1	Book One: "Men on Fire"	August 1, 1995	
#2	Book Two: "Women in Flight"	September 1, 1995	

=== Collected editions ===
In January 2009, the series was collected into a single volume.

== Reception ==
Chris White of Comic Book Resources (CBR) ranked Ruins ninth on the list of "10 of the Most Disturbing Alternate Realities in Marvel Comics", stating that the miniseries is "easily one of the most gruesome tales ever told".

== See also ==
- Murphy's law
