= Cult of the Dragon (sourcebook) =

1998 role-playing game supplement

Cover art by Clyde Caldwell

Cult of the Dragon is a 1998 role-playing game supplement published by TSR for the Forgotten Realms campaign setting using the second edition rules of Advanced Dungeons & Dragons.

== Contents ==
Cult of the Dragon is a sourcebook about the secret society known as the Cult of the Dragon. The book is divided into five chapters:

1. A history of the cult, started by a powerful priest after he went mad after being transformed into a lich.
2. The structure of the cult, its activities and several prominent draconic members of the cults.
3. The forces and organizations trying to oppose the cult.
4. New powers of cultists, new magical items and new spells, as well as a bestiary of new monsters associated with the cult.
5. Suggestions for how the gamemaster can introduce the Cult of the Dragon into a Forgotten Realms campaign, and several adventure hooks.

== Publication history ==
TSR published the Forgotten Realms campaign setting in 1987, and released dozens of sourcebooks and adventures for it. Cult of the Dragon was created by Dale Donovan and was published by TSR in January 1998 with cover art by Clyde Caldwell and interior illustrations by Glen Angus.

== Reception ==
In Issue 9 of the French RPG magazine Backstab, Geoffrey Picard initially thought this was going to be another unoriginal splat book, but changed his mind after reading it, noting, "[This] is a new supplement that appears to be very uninteresting, but only in appearance! First of all, it is all very well presented and I enjoyed reading it immensely, with each new page bringing me new campaign ideas." Picard did admit "This supplement is not original, it is not intended for party game purists, it is teeming with living dead and magical objects. But it also abounds with conspiracies and secret wars, it smells of blood and death, an epic spirit crept into me when reading it." Geoffrey concluded by giving this supplement an overall rating of 8 out of 10, saying, "If you want to play high-level campaigns, if you are waiting for a description of the Black Order worthy of enlivening all your great adventures, don't hesitate: this supplement is for you."

The German RPG magazine Envoyer reviewed the German translation of this book and commented "What you always notice when reading is the attention to detail. For example, the followers of the cult are not simply described superficially (appearance, possible character, etc.), but the author thinks about the motives that each of them might have for joining the cult. Not only does this make them seem more human (or elven), it also gives the reader a better perspective on the cult as a whole. The dragon cult is not just a secret organization, but is made up of many individuals, each of whom has a personality, a story and a goal. This character-driven representation makes it much easier for a game master to feature cultists in adventures and then lead them as NPCs." However, the book was criticized for its complete lack of maps: "The geographical points in the Forgotten Realms mentioned in the text are also useless without an accurate map. Anyone who doesn't own the Forgotten Realms set will be left high and dry (or rather, in the unknown)." But the review ended on a positive note: "This insight into the world of dragons (albeit undead) and their admirers is definitely recommended."

In Issue 113 of the French RPG magazine Casus Belli, Julien Blondel called the history of the cult given in the book "a detailed chronology where we discover everything about the Cult, its evolution, its strongholds and its crusades, including the terrible dragon wars, as well as the powers developed by its powerful followers. The book also covers new powers, taking up around twenty pages, as well as the list of the Cult's rivals and a 100% original bestiary, all of which risk seriously spicing up the lives of your favorite adventurers. Add to that new "dragonesque" objects, really nasty bad guys, dracoliches, intrigues to make those of the Zhentarim seem like day in summer camp, illustrations that do not take readers for mentally retarded and crazed synopses, just so you begin long campaigns riddled with confusion..." Blondel concluded, "If you like Forgotten Realms, don't even pretend to hesitate to get this."

== Other reviews and commentary ==
- Dragon (German Issue 4 - Sep/Oct 1999)
