= K. Tempest Bradford =

African-American science fiction and fantasy author and editor

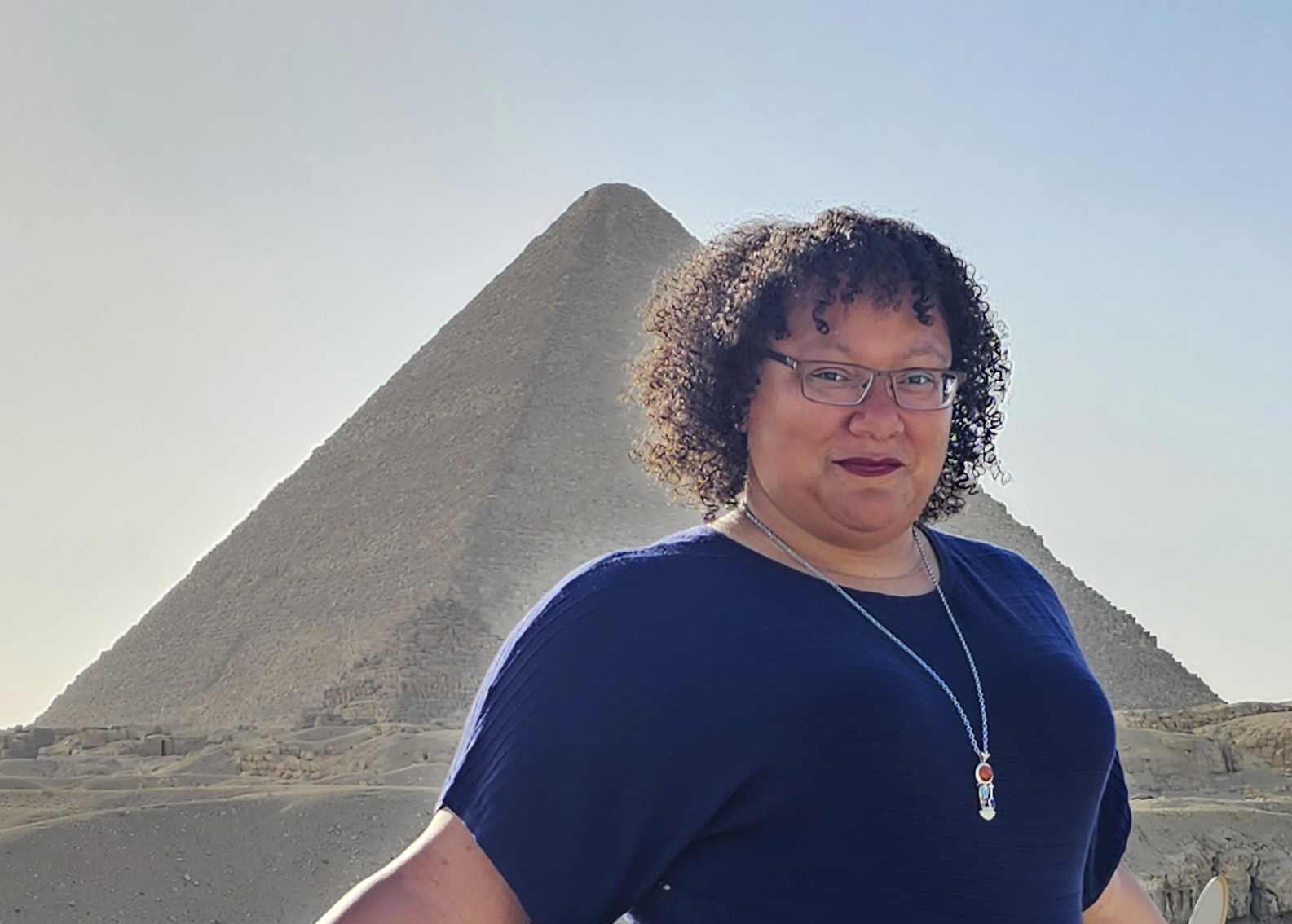
- Bradford in 2023
- Born: April 19, 1978 (age 48); Cincinnati, Ohio, U.S.
- Occupations: Writer, editor, creative writing teacher
- Writing career
- Genres: Science fiction, fantasy, Middle grade fiction
- Notable work: Ruby Finley vs. the Interstellar Invasion
- Notable awards: Andre Norton Nebula Award for Middle Grade and Young Adult Fiction (2023); Locus Award (2020); IGNYTE Award (2023); The Lemonade Award (2022)
- Website: www.ktempestbradford.com

K. Tempest Bradford (born April 19, 1978 in Cincinnati, Ohio) is an African-American science fiction and fantasy author and editor. She was a non-fiction and managing editor with Fantasy Magazine from 2007 to 2009, and has edited fiction for Peridot Books, The Fortean Bureau, and Sybil's Garage. She is the author of Ruby Finley vs. the Interstellar Invasion, her debut middle grade novel published in 2022, which won the Andre Norton Award in 2023.

== Biography ==
A graduate of New York University's Gallatin School of Individualized Study, Bradford is also an alumna of the Clarion West Writers Workshop (class of 2003) and the Online Writing Workshop (formerly Del Rey). She has been a juror for the James Tiptree, Jr. Award and is currently Vice-Chair of the Carl Brandon Society Steering Committee.

Bradford is an activist for racial and gender equality both within and outside of the science fiction community. In 2005, she founded the Angry Black Woman blog, and her contributions under that moniker have appeared in Feminist SF: The Blog, ColorLines, NPR's News & Notes, and African-American studies textbooks.

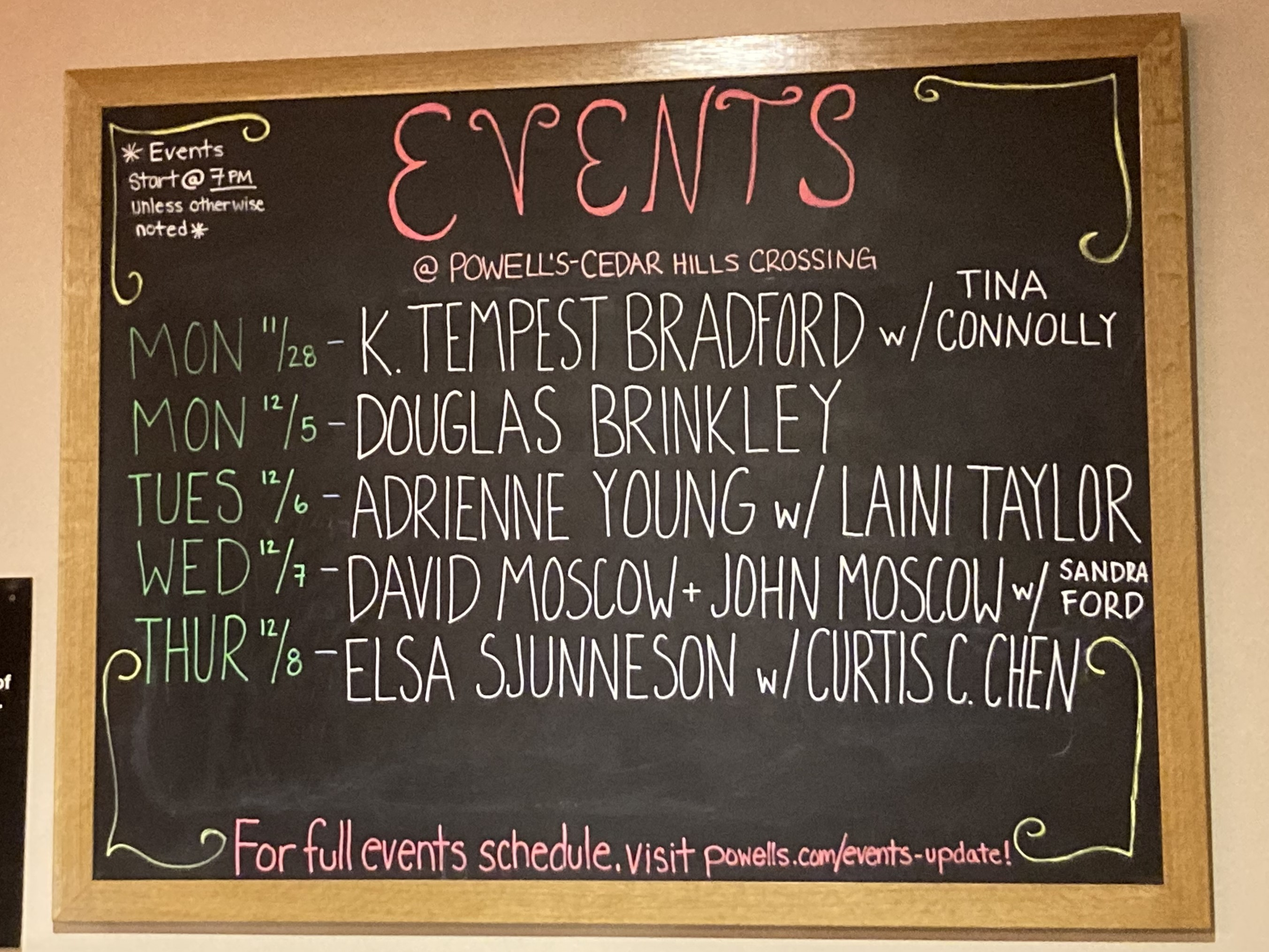
Event chalkboard at with Bradford at Powell's Books

She teaches creative writing classes that focus on writing inclusive narratives for Writing the Other, LitReactor, and Clarion West.

== Selected works ==
=== Fiction ===
- Ruby Finley vs. the Interstellar Invasion (September 2022, Farrar, Straus and Giroux (BYR), ISBN 978-0374388799)
- "The Copper Scarab" in Clockwork Cairo, ed. Matthew Bright, 2017 and Sunspot Jungle: The Ever Expanding Universe of Fantasy and Science Fiction, ed. Bill Campbell, 2019.
- "Until Forgiveness Comes" in Strange Horizons, 2008 and In the Shadow of the Towers: Speculative Fiction in a Post-9/11 World, ed. Douglas Lain, 2015
- "Uncertainty Principle" in Diverse Energies, 2012.
- "Black Feather" in Interfictions, 2007; PodCastle, 2010, and Happily Ever After, ed. John Klima, 2011.
- "Elan Vital" in Sybil's Garage No. 6, 2009 and EscapePod episode 269, 2010.
- "Enmity" in Electric Velocipede issue 17/18, 2009.
- "Different Day" in Federations, 2009.
- "The Seventh Reflection" in Thou Shalt Not... a horror and dark fantasy anthology, 2006.
- "Change of Life" in Farthing, 2006; PodCastle, 2009.
- "Hard Rain" in Farthing, 2006.
- "Why I Don't Drink Anymore" (as Finley Larkin) in Abyss & Apex, 2003.
- "Elf Aware" (as Finley Larkin) in Cafe Irreal, 2002; PodCastle, 2009.
- "What We Make Of It" in Peridot Books, 2000.

=== Non-fiction ===
- "Androids and Allegory", Mother of Invention anthology supplementary essay, Twelfth Planet Press, 2018.
- "Representation Matters: A Literary Call To Arms", LitReactor Magazine, 2017.
- "Cultural Appropriation Is, In Fact, Indefensible", NPR Code Switch blog, 2017.
- io9 Newsstand, a weekly column at io9, 2014 - 2015.
- "An ‘Unexpected’ Treat For Octavia E. Butler Fans", NPR Book Review, 2014.
- "Invisible Bisexuality in Torchwood", Apex Magazine, 2014.
- "Women Are Destroying Science Fiction! (That’s OK; They Created It)", NPR Books, 2014.
- "What Will Be The Next Game Of Thrones? We’ve Got Some Ideas", NPR Books, 2014.
- "The Women We Don't See: Season Thirteen", Chicks Unravel Time: Women Journey Through Every Season of Doctor Who. Mad Norwegian Press, 2012.
- "Why Abraham Lincoln: Vampire Hunter is The Ultimate White Guilt Fantasy", io9, 2012.
- "Martha Jones: Fangirl Blues", Chicks Dig Time Lords: A Celebration of Doctor Who by the Women Who Love It. Mad Norwegian Press, 2010.
- "Why 'Black' and Not 'African American'?", Key Debates: An Introduction To African American Studies. Ed. Henry Louis Gates, Jr. and Jennifer Burton (January 2010)
- Q&A, The WisCon Chronicles, vol. 1. Aqueduct Press, 2007.
- "On the Clarion Workshops", The WisCon Chronicles, vol. 2. Aqueduct Press, 2008.
- "WisCon and POC Spaces", The WisCon Chronicles, vol. 3: Carnival of Feminist SF. Aqueduct Press, 2009.

=== Role-playing games ===
- Van Richten's Guide to Ravenloft (writer, Wizards of the Coast, 2021)

== Awards ==
Year	Award	For
2009	Last Drink Bird Head Award	Gentle Advocacy
2020	Locus Award	Locus Special Award to Writing the Other (Nisi Shawl, Cynthia Ward, and K. Tempest Bradford) for Inclusivity and Representation Education
2020	IGNYTE Award Nominee (The Community Award)	Outstanding Efforts in Service of Inclusion and Equitable Practice in Genre
2021	IGNYTE Award Nominee (The Community Award)	Outstanding Efforts in Service of Inclusion and Equitable Practice in Genre
2021	IGNYTE Award Nominee (Ember Award)	Unsung Contributions to Genre
2022	The Lemonade Award	Acts of kindness by individuals that further science fiction community
2023	The Andre Norton Nebula Award for Middle Grade and Young Adult Fiction	Ruby Finley vs. the Interstellar Invasion
2023	IGNYTE Award Nominee for Best in Middle Grade	Ruby Finley vs. the Interstellar Invasion
