= The Texas Promise =

- Festival release poster
- Directed by: Vanessa Roth
- Produced by: Vanessa Roth; Livio Sanchez
- Cinematography: Arthur Yee; Zachary Sprague; Scott Thurman
- Edited by: Livio Sanchez
- Music by: Asche & Spencer
- Production company: Lindige Films LLC
- Release date: October 25, 2014 (Austin Film Festival)
- Running time: 99 minutes
- Country: United States
- Language: English

The Texas Promise is a 2014 documentary film about public education in Texas. The film follows the 83rd Texas Legislature, as state lawmakers battle over school funding after making $5.4 billion in cuts to public education in the previous legislative session. The film also covers the school finance court case, in which nearly two-thirds of Texas public school districts sued the state alleging that state funding of public education continues to be inadequate and inequitable. The film also covers other major education issues that came up during the 2013 session, like high-stakes testing, school choice, and charter reform. The Texas Promise was produced and directed by Academy Award winning filmmaker Vanessa Roth.

The film premiered on October 25, 2014 at the Austin Film Festival.

== Synopsis ==
When Texas cut $5.4 billion from public schools, it affected 5 million students and made Texas 49th in the country in per pupil spending. The Texas Promise follows the debate over the direction of Texas public education and its impact on the nation. With a lawsuit brought against the state by a collection of school districts claiming that the cutting of over 5 billion dollars from public education was unconstitutional, and a variety of contested bills up for passage in the 83rd Legislature, the film explores what is at stake for students in the Texas school system and what the policy decisions might mean for the future of Texas.

The film uses cinéma vérité, interviews, news clips, and animation. It features national experts in the fields of education, sociology and business. The film covers the day-to-day actions and decisions by legislators in the 83rd Legislative session. The film also shares the stories of families and educators living in the state.
