= Amanda Hamon Kunz =

American game designer

Amanda Hamon Kunz is an American game designer known for her work on the Pathfinder Roleplaying Game and other d20 role-playing game products.

== Career ==
Hamon at Dragon Con in 2026

=== Journalist and freelance writer ===
During her time in high school, Kunz joined some friends' long-running Dungeons & Dragons campaign. In 2006, while Kunz was enrolled at Eastern Michigan University, she began to play some of White Wolf Press's modern-day horror roleplaying games. She decided to attend Gencon, and Kunz was impressed by how easy it was for attendees to chat with the authors and designers of the games she enjoyed playing. After graduation, Kunz became a journalist and reported on health, science, and government issues for several different newspapers and organizations.

She was still enjoying role-playing games, and in 2011, she decided she would like to become an editor in the games industry. She returned to Gencon, this time to develop contacts with games companies, one of them being Wolfgang Baur of Kobold Press. In addition to her journalism work, she began to write freelance articles for several companies, including Hammerdog Games, Kobold Press, Legendary Games, Mechanical Muse, and Paizo Publishing. Between 2012 and 2015, she wrote or contributed to 19 Paizo articles and sourcebooks.

=== Kobold Press ===
In 2012, Wolfgang Baur hired her as an editor for Kobold Press. She worked on several projects as lead developer and editor as well as designer, including the sourcebooks Deep Magic and Southlands. Deep Magic was subsequently awarded a Judges' Spotlight at the ENnies in 2014. Southlands won an ENnie in 2016 for "Best Cartography".

=== Paizo Publishing ===
In 2015 she was hired by Paizo as an assistant developer, and moved to Seattle and then Redmond, Washington. In 2016, Kunz appeared at Gencon as an Industry Insider Featured Presenter. By 2017, Kunz was a Development Coordinator for various Pathfinder projects and the new Starfinder game. Starfinder would subsequently win the 2018 Origins Award for Fan Favorite Role-Playing Game.

=== Wizards of the Coast ===
In December 2020, Hamon announced that she had been hired by Wizards of the Coast as a Senior Designer on Dungeons & Dragons. She is one of the authors of the sourcebook Van Richten's Guide to Ravenloft (2021).
