= The Backward Class =

- Directed by: Madeleine Grant
- Starring: Mala Muniswamy
- Production company: Affinity Films
- Release date: May 2014 (Hot Docs)
- Running time: 91 minutes
- Country: Canada
- Languages: English, Tamil (with English subtitles)

The Backward Class is a 2014 Canadian documentary film directed by Madeleine Grant. The film follows the success of a group of ethnically disadvantaged students near Bangalore, India, in taking high-school graduation exams. The film, created by a group of graduates of the University of British Columbia, premiered at the Hot Docs Canadian International Documentary Festival in May 2014 and won the Audience Favourite award.

The 91-minute documentary was shot inside the Shanti Bhavan school, by Affinity Films. Grant lived and worked at the school while making the film. The dialogue is partly in English and partly in Tamil with English subtitles.

The film was later screened in Toronto, received positive reviews from Now Magazine and The Globe and Mail.

One of the stars of the film, Mala Muniswamy, travelled from India to attend the film's premiere.

== Reception ==
Alex Hutt of Canadian Film Review mentioned that "The Backward Class is definitely a film to put down on your Hot Docs sched."
