= Abraham George =

Indian-American businessman and philanthropist

Abraham M. George
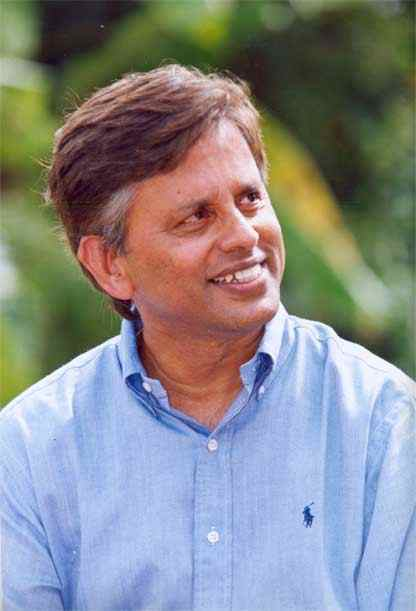
- Abraham M. George, Indian-American businessman and philanthropist
- Born: Thiruvananthapuram, Kerala, India
- Occupations: Businessman, academic, philanthropist
- Known for: Founder of The George Foundation, Shanti Bhavan
- Spouse: Mariam George
- Children: 2
- Website: shantibhavanchildren.org

Abraham M. George is an Indian American businessman, academic, author, and philanthropist. He is the founder of The George Foundation and Shanti Bhavan, a residential school for children from socioeconomically disadvantaged backgrounds in India.

George began his career as an artillery officer in the Indian Army, stationed at the Sela Pass in the North-East Frontier Agency (now Arunachal Pradesh) along the Sino-Indian border. After being honorably discharged as a captain, he moved to the United States, where he pursued careers in finance, academia, and entrepreneurship. He earned a Master of Business Administration in economics in 1973 and a Ph.D. in international finance in 1975 from the Stern School of Business at New York University

In 1976, George founded Multinational Computer Models Inc. (MCM), a financial systems company serving global corporations and financial institutions. The company later partnered with Credit Suisse First Boston, where he served as chief consultant and managing director. In 1998, MCM was acquired by SunGard Data Systems, after which George served as vice chairman for two years.

In 1995, George returned to India and established The George Foundation, a nonprofit organization focused on addressing systemic poverty, social inequality, and access to education and healthcare. Its initiatives include Shanti Bhavan, the Indian Institute of Journalism & New Media, and the Baldev Medical & Community Center, which provides healthcare services to rural communities across Tamil Nadu and Karnataka. The Foundation also conducted a national study on childhood lead poisoning, which contributed to public health advocacy preceding India’s nationwide phase-out of leaded petrol in April 2000.

Shanti Bhavan later expanded with the establishment of a second campus, Shanti Bhavan 2, extending its model of long-term education. The original school gained international attention through the Netflix documentary series Daughters of Destiny.

George is the author of multiple books on international finance and social development. His memoir, Mountains to Cross: Finding Life’s Purpose in Service, was published in the United States in January 2026 and in India in March 2026.

The book debuted at number 16 on the USA Today Best-Selling Books list and at number 23 on the Publishers Weekly Hardcover Nonfiction Bestseller list. It was also ranked number 8 on Porchlight Books’ January 2026 nonfiction bestseller list.[10] The book additionally reached number one in several Amazon categories related to nonprofit and social impact.

The memoir has been covered in media outlets, including Indo American News and LA Weekly, which highlighted George’s transition from finance to philanthropy and his philosophy of combining professional success with social responsibility.

George has also appeared in interviews and podcasts discussing social entrepreneurship, education, and poverty alleviation.[11]

In addition to his writing, George has served on the boards of Human Rights Watch and the International Center for Journalists.

== Education and career ==
After military service, Dr. George joined his mother in Alabama during the era of segregationist Governor George Wallace. He later described the cultural transition as overwhelming: "I felt I had gone to another world, not simply another country."

Dr. George earned his MBA and Ph.D. in international finance from NYU's Stern School of Business. He became a US citizen and joined Chemical Bank (now part of JPMorgan Chase) as an officer.

He returned to India in 1995 and established The George Foundation, which launched projects in education, health, women's empowerment, and rural development. One of its first initiatives was a nationwide study on lead poisoning, which found that 51% of children in Indian cities had elevated blood lead levels. This research played a role in India's 2000 ban on leaded petrol.

== Early life ==
George was born in Thiruvananthapuram (Trivandrum), India, the second of four children.[12]

At age fourteen, he was admitted to the National Defence Academy in Khadakwasla. He graduated as a second lieutenant in the 34th Medium Artillery Regiment. His first posting in 1966 was to the North-East Frontier Agency (NEFA), bordering China. After being injured in a dynamite explosion at Sela Pass, he was reassigned to the Indo-Pakistan border, where he rose to the rank of captain.

== Media and recognition ==
Shanti Bhavan was featured in the Netflix documentary series Daughters of Destiny., which brought international recognition to the school’s educational model.

George’s memoir, Mountains to Cross and his philanthropic work have been covered in media outlets including Indo American News and LA Weekly, which highlighted his transition from finance to philanthropy and his philosophy of combining professional success with social responsibility.

In March 2026, George was interviewed on The Kelly Clarkson Show in connection with the release of his memoir.

He has also participated in interviews and podcast appearances focused on social entrepreneurship, education, and philanthropy.[12]

== Publications ==
- International Finance Handbook (2 volumes), John Wiley & Sons. ISBN 0-471-09861-2.
- Foreign Exchange Management and the Multinational Corporation, Holt, Rinehart and Winston. ISBN 0-03-046641-5.
- Protecting Shareholder Value: International Financial Risk Management, Prentice Hall. ISBN 0-7863-0439-1.
- India Untouched: The Forgotten Face of Rural Poverty, Writer's Collective. ISBN 81-88661-18-X.
- Lead Poisoning Prevention and Treatment: Implementing a National Program in Developing Countries, distributed by the World Bank (2001).
- Mountains to Cross: Finding Life’s Purpose in Service (2026)

== Awards ==
- NYU Stern School of Business Stewart Satter Social Entrepreneurship Award.
- Lifetime Achievers Award for Philanthropy – The Kerala Center (2000).
- Community Service Award – Global Organization of People of Indian Origin (GOPIO), 2017.
- Hind Rattan Award – NRI Welfare Society of India.
- The BookFest First Place Award for Nonfiction - Memoirs - Transformational and Nonfiction - Self-Help - Inspiration

== Book recognitions ==
1. Mountains to Cross – USA Today Bestseller (No. 16)
2. Mountains to Cross – Publishers Weekly Bestseller (No. 23)
3. Mountains to Cross – Porchlight Books Nonfiction Bestseller (No. 8, January 2026) [10]
4. Mountains to Cross – Amazon #1 in nonprofit, philanthropy, and social impact categories

== Additional References ==
1. Shanti Bhavan Children’s Project. “Shanti Bhavan.” https://www.shantibhavanchildren.org/
2. Abraham M. George biography (military service details).
3. New York University Stern School of Business. “Abraham M. George.”
4. The George Foundation. “Lead Poisoning Prevention and Community Health Initiatives.”
5. Abraham George. “Press and Book Information.” https://www.drabrahamgeorge.com/press
6. Netflix. Daughters of Destiny.
7. Indo American News. “From Wall Street to India’s Poorest: Abraham M. George’s Memoir Mountains to Cross.” https://indoamerican-news.com/from-wall-street-to-indias-poorest-abraham-m-georges-memoir-mountains-to-cross-inspires-a-life-of-purpose/
8. USA Today. “Best-Selling Books, January 21, 2026.” https://www.usatoday.com/booklist/date/2026-01-21
9. Publishers Weekly. “Hardcover Nonfiction Bestsellers, January 26, 2026.” https://www.publishersweekly.com/pw/nielsen/hardcovernonfiction/20260126.html
10. Porchlight Books. “January 2026 Nonfiction Bestsellers.” https://www.porchlightbooks.com/collections/january-2026-nonfiction-bestsellers
11. Lisa Haselton. “Interview with Memoirist Dr. Abraham George.” https://lisahaselton.com/2026/01/13/interview-with-memoirist-dr-abraham-george/
12. Abraham M. George. “About.” https://www.drabrahamgeorge.com/about
13. The Kelly Clarkson Show. "Kelly Clarkson Is Amazed By Shanti Bhavan Grad's Miracle Journey From One-Room Hut To PhD" https://www.youtube.com/watch?v=bI7_kdapOyA
