= Terese Nielsen =

American artist and illustrator

- Born: March 11, 1966 (age 60); Aurora, Nebraska, U.S.
- Education: Art Center College of Design
- Occupation: Artist

Terese Nielsen (born March 11, 1966) is an American freelance fantasy artist and illustrator.

== Early life, education, and family ==
Nielsen was born in Aurora, Nebraska, in 1966. Nielsen's brother, Ron Spencer, is also an artist.

In 1984 Nielsen followed her brother and relocated to Rexburg, Idaho, where they studied art at Ricks College. Upon completing her studies there, she studied at the Art Center College of Design (ACCD) in Pasadena, California, graduating with "great distinction" in 1991.

She married Cliff Nielsen, another ACCD graduate, and they illustrated Ruins (1995); they have since divorced. She has four children and resides in Temple City, California, with her wife.

== Career ==
Landmark Entertainment hired Nielsen to help design its themed amusement parks, and DC and Marvel Comics hired her to illustrate several superhero trading cards. She illustrated Marvel graphic novels, one of which was Ruins, which she did with her then-husband, Cliff Nielsen. For Topps, she painted several Xena covers, as well as Star Wars covers for Dark Horse.

Nielsen illustrated the graphic novella that was included as part of the 1993 video game Gabriel Knight: Sins of the Fathers. In a favorable review, Scott A. May wrote, "Nielsen's dark, disturbing visions carry over to many of the game's hand painted back-drops, drawn from a gloomy palette of deep red, blue, and black." In the video game genre, her influence can be seen in Sierra's Gabriel Knight series, and in her work for 3DO's Meridian 59, and she worked with Mythic Entertainment creating the look for the advertising campaign promoting the interactive internet game Dark Age of Camelot.

She began working for Wizards of the Coast in 1996. Nielsen has gained a fan following mainly because of her illustrations for the trading card game Magic: The Gathering. Nielsen has produced art for both Magic and Wizards of the Coast's other products since 1996, in addition to her work as an illustrator of book covers & interiors and movie posters. She has served as a juror for the Spectrum Awards. She created several images for the Harry Potter Trading Card Game, released in 2001.

In reviewing her work "Savant" in the Wildstorm Gallery collection released in 1996, critic Joseph Szadkowski wrote, "Imagine British artist Dante Gabriel Rossetti tickled into a mood by a Sex Pistols album to fully appreciate the Nielsen style." Szadkowski also praised Nielsen's work in the Marvel Comics Code of Honor series (1997).

She created the look for the Sembia series of Forgotten Realms novels, and for Greg Keyes' Age of Unreason series published by Del Rey. Endorsed by Lucas, she was involved in several Star Wars pieces for The New Jedi Order, also published by Del Rey. Nielsen did the cover artwork for the Dungeons & Dragons settings Jakandor, Land of Legend and Jakandor, Isle of Destiny in 1998 and illustrated the covers of three issues of Dragon.

In 1999 the Alderac Entertainment Group published the Gamemasters' guide for the 7th Sea role-playing game, with all art covers since then (main guides and supplements) primarily painted by Nielsen. Also in 1999, she received a nomination for a Chesley Award for Best Gaming-Related Illustration for her illustration of the Magic: The Gathering card "Ertai, Wizard Adept".

Nielsen was a Gen Con artist guest of honor in 2014.

Nielsen has contributed art to the digital collectible card game Hearthstone.

== Controversy ==
On June 18, 2020, during the "Weekly MTG" Twitch stream, Wizards of the Coast revealed that they had ended their relationship with Nielsen and that "the last product that will have any reprint art" by her would be released in the fall of 2020.

This action by Wizards coincided with some fan concerns over Nielsen's alleged views, notably regarding transgender people, her liking or retweeting alt-right activists and conspiracy theorists. Nielsen also gifted and signed some of her art to QAnon and conspiracy-focused YouTube channel Edge of Wonder.
