= Mimi Mondal =

Indian-American speculative fiction writer

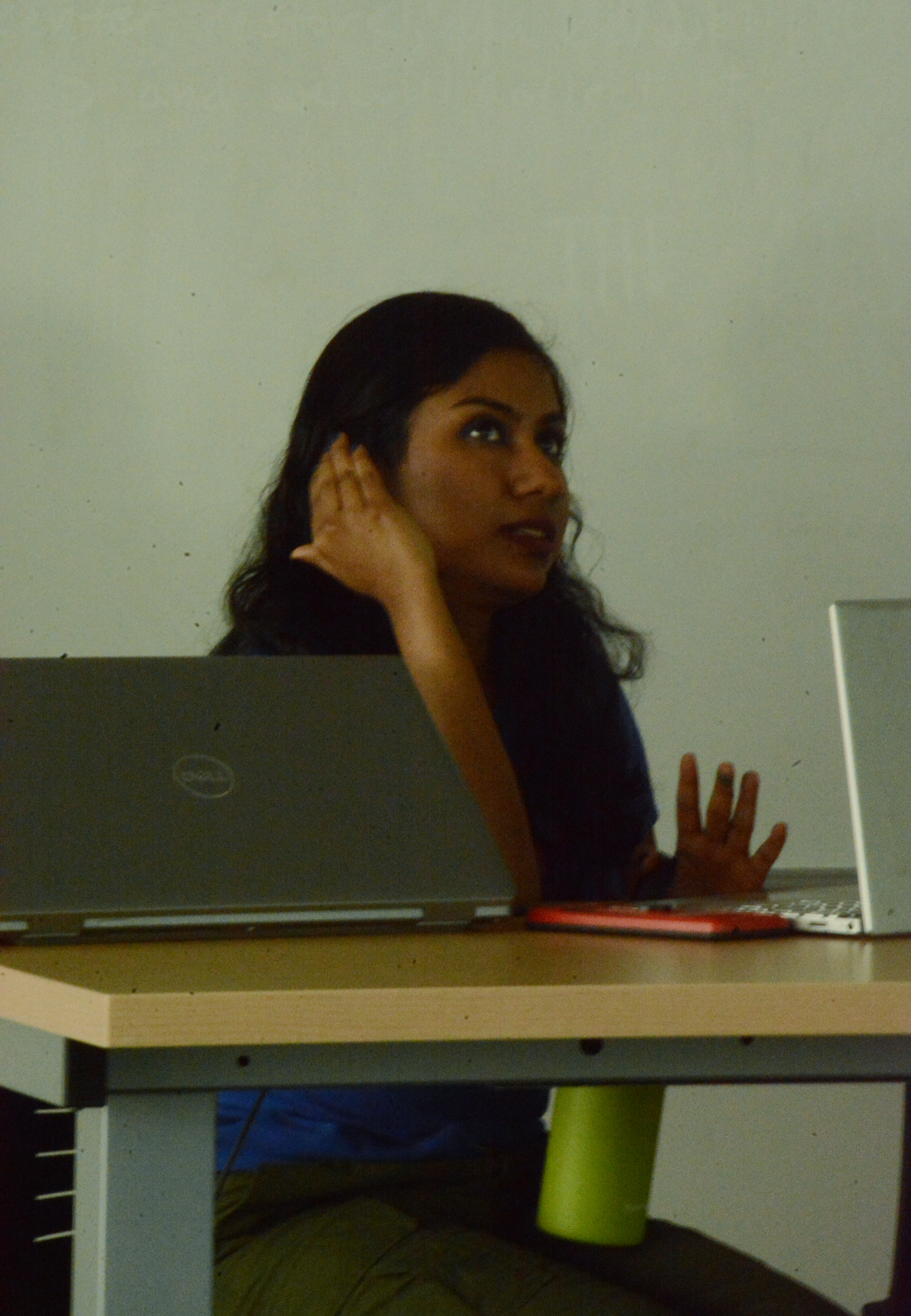
- Born: Monidipa Mondal; Kolkata, India
- Citizenship: Indian
- Education: Jadavpur University; University of Stirling; Clarion West Writers Workshop; Rutgers University
- Website: mimimondal.com

Monidipa "Mimi" Mondal is an Indian speculative fiction writer based in New York. She writes in many genres, including science fiction. Mondal is the co-editor of Luminescent Threads: Connections to Octavia E. Butler, an anthology of letters and essays, which received a Locus Award in 2018 and was a finalist for the Hugo Award and the William Atheling Jr. Award. Mondal is the first writer from India to have been nominated for the Hugo Award.

== Early life ==
Mondal was born and raised in Kolkata, where her father worked as a West Bengal Civil Services (WBCS) officer and her mother worked at the State Bank of India. Mondal was given the nickname "Mimi" at birth, "like Bengali children usually are," she says in a roundtable interview. From 2015 onwards she has primarily published as "Mimi Mondal" rather than "Monidipa Mondal".

Mondal states in an online essay that her two first languages were Bengali and English. She later learned Hindi, Old English, and small amounts of several other languages.

=== Education ===
Mondal attended Nava Nalanda High School, Calcutta International School, and Jadavpur University, receiving a B.A. in English in 2010 and an M.A. in English in 2012. She received the 2013 Commonwealth Shared Scholarship in Publishing Studies and attended the University of Stirling, Scotland, from which she received a Master of Letters (MLitt) in Publishing Studies in 2015.

In 2015, Mondal attended the Clarion West Writers Workshop in Seattle, US, where she was the Octavia E. Butler Memorial Scholar. In 2017, she completed her MFA in creative writing from Rutgers University.

"I feel like many of us are writing the stories we’d like to see! I would really like to see regional mythology, folklore from India being used in stories.... I would also like to see more traditional performances, and actually uncensored historical research reflected in stories, because so much of Indian history that we know is curated to match the idea of post-British nationalism."

== Career ==
Mondal worked as an editor at Penguin India between 2012 and 2013, and as the poetry and reprint editor of Uncanny Magazine between 2017 and 2018. Her work has appeared in such venues as Tor.com, Uncanny Magazine, Fireside Magazine, The Book Smugglers, Daily Science Fiction, Kindle Magazine, Muse India, Podcastle, and Scroll. Mondal is also a history and publishing scholar with a special interest in South Asian speculative fiction, and wrote a two-part history of South Asian speculative fiction for Tor.com in 2018.

=== Luminescent Threads ===
Luminescent Threads: Connections to Octavia E. Butler is a collection of works by more than 40 writers, issued in honor of the 70th anniversary of Octavia E. Butler's birth. It is Mondal's first book-length work. The anthology was co-edited by Mondal and Alexandra Pierce. It consists of memoirs written as if addressed to Butler personally, mixed with more scholarly essays. The title is derived from Butler's novel Patternmaster.

Luminescent Threads was nominated for the 2018 Hugo Award in the category of Best Related Work, and received the Locus Award for Best Non-fiction on 22 June 2018. It was nominated for a British Fantasy Award. It was also nominated for a 2018 William Atheling Jr. Award for Criticism or Review, an Australian Science Fiction Award, being eligible for its Australian editor Pierce and Australian publisher Twelfth Planet Press.

=== Game design ===
Mondal wrote the Dungeons & Dragons adventure "In the Mists of Manivarsha" in the 2022 anthology Journeys through the Radiant Citadel. Mondal and the other writers on Journeys through the Radiant Citadel were nominated for the Nebula Award for Best Game Writing in March 2023.

In 2022, Mondal joined Asmadi Games as a game writer.

== Awards and nominations ==
Year	Award	Category	Work	Result	Ref.
2018	Locus Award	Non-fiction	Luminescent Threads: Connections to Octavia E. Butler	Won	
2018	Hugo Award	Best Related Work	Luminescent Threads: Connections to Octavia E. Butler	Nominated	
2018	William Atheling Jr. Award	Criticism or Review	Luminescent Threads: Connections to Octavia E. Butler	Nominated	
2018	British Fantasy Award	Best Non-Fiction	Luminescent Threads: Connections to Octavia E. Butler	Nominated	
2019	Nebula Award	Best Novelette	"His Footsteps, Through Darkness and Light"	Nominated	
2022	A.C. Bose Grant for South Asian Speculative Literature		"Twenty-Nine Days Before Remaking the World"	Won	
2023	Nebula Award	Best Game Writing	Journeys through the Radiant Citadel	Nominated	

== Bibliography ==
=== Short fiction ===
==== The Other People series (published anachronistically) ====
- Other People (2016)
- This Sullied Earth, Our Home (2015)
- The Trees of My Youth Grew Tall (2018)
- His Footsteps, through Darkness and Light (2019)

==== Other stories ====
- So It Was Foretold (2018)
- Learning to Swim (2017)
- And the Final Frontier is Heaven (2015)
- Things to Do after They’re Gone (2015)
- The Sea Sings at Night (2015)

=== Anthology ===
- Luminescent Threads: Connections to Octavia E. Butler with Alexandra Pierce (Twelfth Planet Press, August 2017; ISBN 978-1-922101-42-6)

=== Essays ===
- A Short History of South Asian Speculative Fiction, Part I and Part II (2018)
- On Translating the Stories Yet Unwritten: A Dalit Perspective from India (2017)
- Missive from a Woman in a Room in a City in a Country in a World Not Her Own (2017)
- Characters Are Not A Coloring Book Or, Why the Black Hermione is a Poor Apology for the Ingrained Racism of Harry Potter (2016)
