= Diablo II: To Hell and Back =

Role-playing game adventure

- Genre: RPG
- Publisher: Wizards of the Coast
- Publication date: 2001

Diablo II: To Hell and Back is a 2001 role-playing game adventure published by Wizards of the Coast for Dungeons & Dragons.

== Plot summary ==
Diablo II: To Hell and Back is an adventure in which a dungeon crawl is based on Diablo II.

== Reviews ==
- Pyramid
- Backstab
- Rue Morgue #22
