= F. Wesley Schneider =

American game designer and author

- Born: United States
- Citizenship: United States
- Occupations: Game designer, author
- Writing career
- Language: English
- Genres: Fantasy, horror

F. Wesley Schneider is an American game designer and author known for his work on Pathfinder Roleplaying Game and Dungeons & Dragons (D&D). He was the co-lead designer on the D&D 5th Edition adventure anthology Journeys through the Radiant Citadel (2022), which was nominated for the Nebula Award for Best Game Writing, the 2023 Diana Jones Award for Excellence in Gaming, and 2023 ENNIE Awards for Best Adventure and Best Product.

== Career ==
Schneider joined Paizo Inc. as an assistant editor on Dragon magazine in 2003. With James Jacobs he was one of the architects of the Pathfinder Adventure Path series. He has written numerous adventures and sourcebooks such as Seven Days to the Grave, Book of the Damned: Princes of Darkness, Rule of Fear and others. He was promoted to editor-in-chief in 2012.

Schneider is the author of Pathfinder Tales: Bloodbound and the novella Guilty Blood. His other fiction has appeared in Pathfinder Adventure Path and Eclipse Phase: After the Fall.

In May 2016, Schneider was announced as a Gen Con Industry Insider Featured Presenter.

In July 2016, it was announced that Schneider would be working with Stranger Comics to produce a Vampire Hunter D supplement for the Pathfinder Roleplaying Game. In May 2017, Schneider left his role as editor-in-chief at Paizo Inc and ran his own company for two years.

He later became employed by Wizards of the Coast, first as a developer for Dungeons & Dragons, and then as a senior game designer for Dungeons & Dragons. From 2019 to 2022, Schneider was a writer on several Unearthed Arcana playtest releases for the 5th Edition of Dungeons & Dragons. (Note: These titles include: Barbarian and Monk (2019), Sorcerer and Warlock (2019), Bard and Paladin (2019), Cleric, Druid, and Wizard (2019), Fighter, Ranger, and Rogue (2019), Class Feature Variants (2019), Fighter, Rogue, Wizard (2019), Subclasses, Part 1 (2020), Subclasses, Part 2 (2020), Subclasses, Part 3 (2020), Psionic Options Revisited (2020), Gothic Lineages (2021), Heroes of Krynn (2022), and Heroes of Krynn Revisited (2022).) He was a designer and editor on the supplemental sourcebook Tasha's Cauldron of Everything (2020), and an editor on the supplemental sourcebook Fizban's Treasury of Dragons (2021) and the campaign setting sourcebook Strixhaven: A Curriculum of Chaos (2021).

Schneider was the co-lead designer, with James Wyatt, on the campaign setting sourcebook Mythic Odysseys of Theros (2020). He was then the lead designer on the campaign setting sourcebook Van Richten's Guide to Ravenloft (2021).

During the COVID-19 pandemic, Ajit George, a writer on Van Richten's Guide to Ravenloft, pitched a new project idea to Schneider and Jeremy Crawford, D&D's Lead Rules Designer. This project became the adventure anthology Journeys through the Radiant Citadel (2022), with George and Schneider as the book's co-lead designers.

Journeys through the Radiant Citadel (2022) was the first official "anthology of D&D adventures to be written entirely by Black and brown authors" published by Wizards of the Coast. Schneider's work on Journeys through the Radiant Citadel was nominated for the Nebula Award for Best Game Writing in March 2023, the 2023 Diana Jones Award for Excellence in Gaming, and 2023 ENNIE Awards for Best Adventure and Best Product.

In 2022, Schneider was the lead designer on the adventure module Dragonlance: Shadow of the Dragon Queen (2022).
