= Baliganapalli =

Coordinates: 12°52′N 77°56′E

- village
- Interactive map of Baliganapalli
- Country: India
- State: Tamil Nadu
- District: Krishnagiri

Languages
  - Official: Tamil
  - Regional: Kannada, Telugu
- Time zone: UTC+5:30 (IST)

Baliganapalli is a village in the Hosur taluk of Krishnagiri district, Tamil Nadu, India.
