= Dungeons & Dragons Adventure Game: Diablo II Edition =

Role-playing game supplement

Dungeons & Dragons Adventure Game: Diablo II Edition is a 2000 role-playing game supplement published by Wizards of the Coast for Advanced Dungeons & Dragons.

== Contents ==
Dungeons & Dragons Adventure Game: Diablo II Edition is a boxed set that presents a simplified fast-play Dungeons & Dragons system.

== Publication history ==
The Diablo II Adventure Game was published in May 2000.

== Reviews ==
- Envoyer
- Pyramid
- Games Unplugged #3 (Oct./Nov., 2000)
