= Jakandor, Island of War =

1997 role-playing supplement

Jakandor, Island of War is a 1997 role-playing game supplement published by TSR for the second edition of Advanced Dungeons & Dragons.

== Contents ==
Jakandor, Island of War is a supplement which introduces the land of Jakandor, populated by two antagonistic societies: the barbarian Knorr, who have been exiled to this island by their patron deity for their sins, and the Charonti, a race of necromancers. This book concentrates on the Knorr, who can receive redemption from their deity by destroying the Charonti. The setting uses the rules for the second edition of Dungeons & Dragons.

The book includes an introductory adventure and many scenario ideas.

== Publication history ==
In 1996, TSR started a new series of supplements titled "Odyssey" with three that outlined the Savage Coast setting. These were followed in 1997 by Jakandor, Island of War, a 112-page softcover book by Jeff Grubb that detailed the island of Jakandor.

The following year TSR published two more supplements about Jakandor, also by Grubb: Jakandor, Isle of Destiny, and Jakandor, Land of Legend. Both of these introduced the necromantic society of the Charonti.

Although at least one more book was planned, no other products in the Odyssey line were published, as the focus of TSR and Wizards of the Coast turned to development of the third edition of D&D.

== Reception ==
In Issue 9 of Backstab, Kanada gave this an excellent rating of 9 out of 10, saying "Island of War is an excellent exercise in style that is sure to give dungeon players a change of scenery. [...] In short, judging by the quality of this supplement, I can't wait to read the sequel."

The role-playing magazine Envoyer noted that "The culture offers little that is new. Basically, it is an idealized barbarian culture in which practically every human being is a fighter." There were also issues with the paucity of information about the setting: "Once you have worked through the culture and rules section, you will be amazed to find that a paltry 14 pages of location, clan and character descriptions are left, of course much too little for an island with 800 x 350 miles of land area. You should expect more, especially with the first product of a new campaign." Despite this, Envoyer concluded, "The special charm of Jakandor lies in the reduction of races to people and two social systems. A confrontation is inevitable. Fantastic possibilities arise when you play with two different groups, maybe even with two gamemasters."

== Reviews ==
- Casus Belli #118
