= Van Richten's Guide to Ravenloft =

D&D 5e campaign setting

- Rules required: Dungeons & Dragons, 5th edition
- Authors: F. Wesley Schneider, Whitney Beltrán, Bill Benham, K. Tempest Bradford, Banana Chan, Jeremy Crawford, Dan Dillion, Crystal Frasier, Ajit George, Amanda Hamon, Cassandra Khaw, Renee Knipe, Kira Magrann, Lee Knox Ostertag, Ben Petrisor, Jessica Price, Taymoor Rehman, Jessica Ross, John Stavropoulos, Jabari Weathers, James Wyatt
- First published: May 18, 2021
- Pages: 256
- ISBN: 978-0786967254

Van Richten's Guide to Ravenloft is a sourcebook published in 2021 that details the Domains of Dread from the Ravenloft campaign setting for the 5th edition of the Dungeons & Dragons fantasy role-playing game.

== Summary ==
Van Richten's Guide to Ravenloft is a 256-page campaign and adventure guide for using the Ravenloft setting in the 5th edition. The book includes an overview of 39 Domains of Dread and a 20-page adventure called The House of Lament. The book's marginalia is presented as correspondence between the vampire hunter Rudolph Van Richten, "D&D's Van Helsing equivalent", and "other heroes in Ravenloft like Ezmerelda d'Avenir and the Weathermay-Foxgrove Twins". The Dungeon Master section includes an overview of safety tools for running a horror themed game such as "things like the X-Card, trigger warnings, boundaries, and establishing clear lines of communication". It also includes detailed advice on running a horror themed campaign and a breakdown of the various types of horror in the genre.

The book expands on game elements for the 5th edition, such as:

- Two new subclasses; the College of Spirits for bards and the Undead pact for warlocks
- New character lineages (the dhampir, the hexblood, and the reborn) and new character backgrounds "themed specifically for a horror setting"
- The Dark Gift mechanic; a mechanic that provides a role-playing tie "to the Domains of Dread by bestowing benefits that may have a deadly cost"
- A horror themed monster bestiary

== Publication history ==
The alternate cover showcases Ezmerelda d'Avenir along with Tatyana who is reflected in Strahd's sword.

Van Richten's Guide to Ravenloft was published on May 18, 2021 and features cover art by Anna Podedworna. An alternate cover is available only in local game stores with art by Scott M. Fischer. It is the second 5th edition book that focuses on Ravenloft setting; the first was the adventure module Curse of Strahd (2016). Polygon reported that the book has multiple authors, similar to Candlekeep Mysteries, and that "among them is Wizards' new senior designer Amanda Hamon (formerly of Kobold Press), Cassandra Khaw (Nothing But Blackened Teeth), Lee Knox Ostertag (The Witch Boy), and K. Tempest Bradford (The Copper Scarab)".

"Lead designer Wes Schneider told Polygon that the goal was to move beyond the derivative tropes that have plagued the Ravenloft setting in the past, while also allowing players to engage with the material from a number of different perspectives". When asked if the book could be used for a family-friendly game, Schneider said, "We understand that many folks these days play with their kids, play with younger players. Horror doesn't need to mean an R-rated movie. It doesn't mean for adults only. [...] Horror can be cartoons like Scooby Doo or like the old Ghostbusters cartoon. Those sort of things have horror elements to them while also being action stories, adventure stories, mystery stories, suspenseful stories. It doesn't need to be all gory and visceral".

It was also released as a digital product through the following Wizards of the Coast licensees: D&D Beyond, Fantasy Grounds, and Roll20. In July 2021, Beadle & Grimm (another Wizards of the Coast licensee) will release a limited run boxset called Shadowy Silver Edition of Van Richten's Guide to Ravenloft.

== Related products ==
=== Unearthed Arcana ===
The Unearthed Arcana series is the 5th edition public playtest where the content released is "a near-final draft of the rules"; parts of Van Richten's Guide to Ravenloft was developed through this playtest. The two new subclasses premiered in 2020: Subclasses, Part 4 (August 2020) and allowed "for both classes to lean into dark necromancy more than ever before". The new character lineages premiered in Gothic Lineages (January 2021) and presented the "Dhampir (half-vampire, half-human), Hexblood (descended from a hag), and Reborn (a person brought back from the dead) as playable options".

Charlie Hall, for Polygon, wrote that lineages "represent a more foundational change for the original role-playing game, and an iteration on how the game was originally conceived in the 1970s. In 2020, Wizards was criticized by its community for how it deals with issues of cultural sensitivity, especially with the concept of race. Lineages build on the rules published in Tasha's Cauldron of Everything, which also had a section dealing with race. According to Gothic Lineages, Tasha's Cauldron and Van Richten's Guide will help to inform a new path forward for D&D, one where race is no longer tied to concepts like ability scores, known languages, alignment, 'or any other trait that is purely cultural'."

=== The Black Dice Society ===
The Black Dice Society (2021) is an official actual play streaming series broadcast on the Dungeons & Dragons Twitch and YouTube channels which premiered on April 1, 2021 and is set across multiple Domains of Dread in Ravenloft. The campaign showcases the Van Richten's Guide to Ravenloft sourcebook. B. Dave Walters is the show's Dungeon Master with a cast of six players: Tanya DePass, Noura Ibrahim, Deejay Knight, Mark Meer, Saige Ryan and Becca Scott.

=== D&D Adventurers League ===
The Ravenloft: Mist Hunters storyline was announced in April 2021 as a "horror-themed campaign" for the D&D Adventurers League with each adventure in the series focusing "on one or more subgenres of horror as a thematic anchor". The series will start on July 9, 2021 and it corresponds with the Van Richten's Guide to Ravenloft sourcebook. The storyline will consist of "14 adventures, including two Epics, and will take players from Level 1 to Level 8". The two Epic adventures will bookend the series and will include "multi-group play and interaction" while the other 12 adventures can be run sequentially by a single group. In contrast to previous Adventurers League storylines, Ravenloft: Mist Hunters will shift away from a tactical combat focus and instead "will focus on story, social interaction, and investigation".

== Reception ==
In Publishers Weekly's "Best-selling Books Week Ending May 22, 2021", Van Richten's Guide to Ravenloft was #4 in "Hardcover Nonfiction" and sold 25,624 units. In USA Today's "Best-Selling Books List for May 23, 2021", Van Richten's Guide to Ravenloft was #8.

Charlie Hall, for Polygon, highlighted various Domains of Dread where each is a "seed of a dark and magnificent adventure" and that both the new lineages and the Dark Gifts mechanic expand player options. Hall commented that "alongside these kinds of damning in-game consequences comes plenty of talk about consent. Van Richten's Guide includes an entire chapter on the concept, and fully brings concepts like the X-Card into modern D&D, even including creator John Stavropoulos among its authors". Hall also highlighted that the book does not include statblocks for the "marquee villains listed" – "it's explained away early in the book, whose authors say that a Domain's villain doesn't always have to be the big bad itching for a fight. Having run a battle against Strahd and other monsters of his ilk in many game systems many times, I agree with Wizard's bold design decision. There's more to D&D than combat, and this omission will help to steer players toward more elaborate role-play and world building, and relieve the tension of having to maximize their own stats and magical powers to win the day". Hall wrote, "ultimately, it's the little touches that really make Van Richten's Guide special. [...] The creators have shown an attention to detail and a devotion to craft that has been building throughout this run of D&D's 5th edition".

Ed Fortune, for Starburst Magazine, gave the book five stars and commented that "Van Richten's Guide to Ravenloft is the peak of where Dungeons and Dragons is right now; a fun and accessible game with more to offer than just straight forward power fantasy. It is designed to be deep and engaging and yet they've also made sure that no-one is excluded by the content".

Christian Hoffer, for ComicBook.com, highlighted that Van Richten's Guide to Ravenloft outlines 17 Domains of Dread in depth and provides short descriptions of another 22 Domains along with the "biographies of about a dozen NPCs" and "32 new monster statblocks". Hoffer also highlighted the new "Fear and Stress" ruleset as an alternate to the previous "dated" Madness ruleset. He commented that "this book is going to be divisive" and that "the most visible change in Van Richten's Guide to Ravenloft is how the book approaches the lore of Ravenloft itself. Some Domains and their respective Darklords are given wholesale revisions. [...] Initially, the patchwork nature of how Dungeons & Dragons approached their updates to Ravenloft feels odd, but it's obvious that most of these changes are designed to streamline the nature of the Domains of Ravenloft". Hoffer's "biggest criticism" is that "none of the book's Darklords are given updated statblocks [...]. Although the book does provide a walkthrough on how to better customize a statblock to meet a campaign's needs, a lot of DMs (especially those with limited time) aren't going to be satisfied with how the book approaches monsters and combat in general. [...] I feel that Van Richten's Guide to Ravenloft will be one of the most-discussed books published by Wizards of the Coast in recent years. There are a lot of interesting design choices and decisions in this book and they mark a potential shift in how the D&D design team (now led by Ray Winninger) approaches Fifth Edition design".

Liam Nolan, for CBR, highlighted that Van Richten's Guide to Ravenloft breakdowns what horror is including two pages on each of the following types of horror: "body horror, cosmic horror, dark fantasy, folk horror, ghost stories and gothic horror" and "half-page sections for disaster horror, occult detective stories, psychological horror and slasher horror". Nolan wrote that the book "offers a lot of advice on how to successfully run a horror campaign, and the advice is excellent. Initially, there's a lot of attention paid to consent and communication, which is really important for any campaign, but especially horror, as people are dealing with things that are fundamentally unsettling. [...] The most important section of Chapter 4, though, deals with pacing. Horror, as a genre, really relies heavily on pacing and figuring out just how much to reveal and when. [...] There's an important note throughout Van Richten's Guide to Ravenloft that asks DMs to see how they can subvert some of the tropes mentioned throughout. One of the big difficulties with horror can be that, those well-verse in the genre, can start to feel its effects less and less because they're able to anticipate what should genuinely be a scary or horrifying turn of events too early into the story. By undermining or playing with the various suggestions in the genres sections, a good DM can create a really compelling — and terrifying— story".

Rob Wieland, for Forbes.com, said "Ravenloft's popularity can't be stopped as Fifth Edition returns to the Domains of Dread with a setting book that delves into the domains beyond Count Strahd's Barovia. Van Richten's Guide to Ravenloft offers more than write-ups of dozens of classic horror domains."
