= Vanessa Roth =

American filmmaker

Vanessa Roth is an American filmmaker who writes, produces and directs non-fiction films. She has won a number of awards for her films, including a 2008 Academy Award for Best Short Documentary for Freeheld; an Emmy Honors Award for Social Impact and a IDA Nomination for best doc series for her Netflix series, Daughters of Destiny; an Alfred I duPont-Columbia award for Taken In: The Lives of America's Foster Children; Impact Doc Awards for Outstanding Achievement in filmmaking for The Girl and The Picture; two Sundance Special Jury Prizes; two Cine Golden Eagles; two Casey Medals; and a MacArthur Grant. She directed Mary J. Blige's My Life (2021).

Some of her films include Liberation Heroes: The Last Eyewitnesses, The Girl and the Picture, Freeheld, Close to Home, Aging Out, The Third Monday in October, 9/11’s Toxic Dust, No Tomorrow, The Other Side, American Teacher, and The Texas Promise. She was also the executive producer, writer, and director of Daughters of Destiny: The Journey of Shanti Bhavan - a four-part Netflix original documentary series released in 2017.

== Personal life ==
She earned a master's degree in social work with a minor in family law from Columbia University. She lives in Shelter Island, New York, and has three children. She is the daughter of screenwriter Eric Roth and archeologist Linda Roth.
