= Jakandor, Isle of Destiny =

1997 role-playing supplement

iCover art by Terese Nielsen

Jakandor, Isle of Destiny is a role-playing game supplement published by TSR for the second edition of Advanced Dungeons & Dragons. It is the second of three supplements about the Isle of Jakandor.

== Contents ==
The first sourcebook about Jakandor, Island of War, introduced the land of Jakandor, populated by two antagonistic societies: the barbarian Knorr, who have been exiled to this island by their patron deity for their sins, and the Charonti, a race of once mighty necromancers seeking to rediscover their past glory. The first book focused on the Knorr. In Island of Destiny, the Charoni are detailed, with chapters on Charonti society, creating Charonti player characters, new rules, tools, spells and magic, and important Charonti non-player characters. The setting uses the rules for the second edition of Dungeons & Dragons.

The book includes an introductory adventure, "Graduation Exercise."

== Publication history ==
In 1996, TSR started a new series of supplements for the second edition of AD&D titled "Odyssey". The first three outlined the Savage Coast setting. These were followed in 1997–98 by a trilogy of books about an island called Jakandor: Jakandor, Island of War (1997), Jakandor, Isle of Destiny (1998), and Jakandor, Land of Legend (1998). The second book, Isle of Destiny, is a 112-page softcover book designed by Kirk Botula, with cover art by Terese Nielsen and interior art by Rick Tucker.

Although at least one more Jakandor book was originally planned, it was never developed because the focus of TSR and Wizards of the Coast turned to development of the third edition of D&D.

== Reception ==
In Issue 115 of the French magazine Casus Belli, Serge Olivier was very pleased by this book, calling it "simply excellent." Olivier was very impressed by the idea of detailing two factions at war with each other, but presenting each from their own point of view, inviting players and gamemasters to explore either or both sides. Olivier concluded, "Island of Destiny proves to be inseparable from Island of War and is one of the best TSR productions in a long time."

Three issues later, Olivier reviewed all three Jakandor books as a set and commented, "the result is not only interesting but even, at times, remarkable. Although having taken as a starting idea a cliché of fantasy - the proud barbarians who do not like the degenerate necromancers who themselves can't stand muscular simpletons - the authors knew how to infuse enough originality in Jakandor to make it one of the best productions of TSR in recent years." Olivier concluded, "The great interest of Jakandor is that the two antagonistic peoples are described with enough detail to make them very alive. From then on, it becomes a pleasure to respect the cultural particularities of each one. This opens the way to beautiful moments for roleplaying, right in the middle of a hostile environment where there is no shortage of danger."

The German magazine Envoyer had not been impressed by the first book of the Jakandor trilogy but found much more to like in Isle of Destiny: "Thanks to the Charonti, a much more interesting tribe, this book is much more appealing [...] All in all, it might be worth starting a mini-campaign after all, at least on the Charonti side." In conclusion, "An impressive portrayal of a mission-conscious people fighting for world domination and at the same time (in vain?) for their survival."

Writing in Backstab, Michaël Croitoriu liked this book, commenting "Where a few years ago TSR would have created yet another soporific campaign setting, Jakandor is a real elixir of youth, even a reserve of Viagra for the oldest among you." Croitoriu concluded by giving the book a very good rating of 8 out of 10.
