= Guidon Games =

Wargame publisher

- Type: Private (defunct)
- Industry: wargaming publisher
- Headquarters: Evansville, Indiana (1970–72); Belfast, Maine (1972–73)
- Key people: Don Lowry; Julie Lowry; Gary Gygax
- Products: Chainmail; Fight in the Skies; Tractics; Alexander the Great

Guidon Games (1970–1973) was a game manufacturer that produced board games and rules for wargaming with military miniatures. The company is notable for its association with Gary Gygax, and its decision not to publish Gygax's co-creation and subsequent bestselling game Dungeons & Dragons.

== History ==
By the late 1960s the miniature wargaming hobby had grown large enough that there was a demand for rulebooks dedicated to a single historical period. Don Featherstone of the UK produced booklets for eight different periods in 1966. A few years later the Wargames Research Group began producing rulesets with an emphasis on historical accuracy.

In 1970, Don Lowry and his wife Julie opened Lowry Hobbies in Belleville, Illinois, a suburb of St. Louis. It started as a mail-order business selling military miniatures to wargamers and wargame modelers. However, after some success selling Fast Rules, a set of WWII tank combat rules designed by Leon Tucker, Mike Reese and Gary Gygax of the LGTSA, Lowry founded Guidon Games and conceived the Wargaming with Miniatures series for which he recruited rulebook authors from the ranks of the International Federation of Wargamers (IFW).

Through the IFW, Lowry met Gary Gygax, who at the time was unemployed and living in nearby Lake Geneva, Wisconsin. Lowry hired Gygax in 1970 to develop the "Wargaming with Miniatures" series of games. Gygax also co-authored the first title in the series, Chainmail, which became Guidon's best seller. The series came to include games and books by Lou Zocchi, Tom Wham, and Dave Arneson. Other notable titles in the series were Tractics, one of the first published games to make use of 20-sided dice, and Don't Give Up The Ship!, the first collaboration between Gygax and Arneson, who would later co-create Dungeons & Dragons.

Cover of Grosstaktik missing Guidon Games logo

Gygax also designed two board games for Lowry in 1971, Alexander the Great and Dunkirk: The Battle of France. However, when Don and Julie Lowry moved their young family and the company to Belfast, Maine in November 1972, Gygax stayed behind in Lake Geneva.

So disorganized was the business in its new location that Lowry neglected to put the "Guidon Games" logo on the front cover of Grosstaktik, the first product published in Belfast. When Gygax reached out to Lowry shortly after the move with an idea for a new type of game called Dungeons & Dragons, Lowry was not in any position to publish it, prompting Gygax to found TSR with Don Kaye in order to sell his new game.

Before the move to Belfast, Lowry had acquired Panzerfaust Magazine, and in 1973, Lowry decided to bring Guidon Games to a close in order to concentrate on the magazine.

When Guidon went out of business, Avalon Hill acquired the rights to Alexander the Great, and Gary Gygax worked with Donald Greenwood to revise a second edition of the game, which was published by Avalon Hill in 1974. Gygax's new company TSR acquired Guidon's remaindered stock of board games and rules, and offered them for sale.

In a 2004 interview, Gygax recalled his time with Guidon Games:

Guidon Games had a game shop, sold gaming via the mail, published a magazine and likewise printed and sold military miniatures rulebooks and boxed board wargames. They were small but certainly a legitimate company.... I was paid for the work I did for them, yes. Unfortunately, sales volume did not make the income received thus sufficient to do more than supplement income from other work. I was asked to go to work for them full time. That would have required me to move to the state of Maine. Tom Wham did so, but I thought their new location was a poor choice. Furthermore, the company was not run in an aggressive and responsive manner. In my opinion there was no chance for growth and success as things stood and I said so to Guidon. Sadly, I was correct in my judgement.

== Products ==
Wargaming with Miniatures Series

Title	Date	Author(s)	Product Code
Chainmail	1971	Gary Gygax & Jeff Perren	WM101
Tractics	1971	Mike Reese & Leon Tucker with Gary Gygax	WM102
Hardtack	1971	Lou Zocchi	WM103
Fast Rules	1972	Mike Reese & Leon Tucker	WM104
Don't Give Up The Ship!	1972	Dave Arneson & Gary Gygax with Mike Carr	WM105
Grosstaktik	1972	Leon Tucker	WM106
Ironclad	1973	Tom Wham & Don Lowry	WM107
Tricolor	--	Rick Crane	unpublished

Board Games

Title	Date	Author(s)	Product Code
Alexander the Great	1971	Gary Gygax	GG001
Dunkirk: The Battle of France	1971	Gary Gygax	GG002
Fight in the Skies	1972	Mike Carr	GG103
Atlanta	1973	Don Lowry	GG201
Lankhmar	--	Gary Gygax	unpublished

Board Game Supplements

Title	Date	Author(s)	Game Supplemented	Product Code
Alexander's Other Battles	1972	Gary Gygax	Alexander the Great	PG2
Wargamer's Guide to Afrika Korps	1972	Don Greenwood	Afrika Korps	WG101
Wargamer's Guide to Battle of the Bulge	1972	Don Greenwood	Battle of the Bulge	WG102
Wargamer's Guide to Stalingrad	1972	Don Greenwood	Stalingrad	
