= Castle & Crusade Society =

Miniature wargaming club

The Castle & Crusade Society was a chapter of the International Federation of Wargaming dedicated to medieval miniature wargaming.

== Formation ==
It was formed by Gary Gygax and Rob Kuntz in 1970. Its starting membership included Gary Gygax, Rob Kuntz and Jeff Perren, and as of mid-April 1970, also included Dave Arneson.

Gygax created the Castle & Crusade Society special interest group as part of the International Federation of Wargamers, inspired by his enthusiasm for medieval warfare. Gygax had developed an interest in miniature games, so he and Jeff Perren designed a set of medieval miniatures rules called 'Chainmail' which was first published in the Castle & Crusade Society's fanzine The Domesday Book.

== Domesday Book ==
Domesday Book #13 (July 1972)

The C&CS published a newsletter called the Domesday Book. Its first issue is dated March 1, 1970; both the first and second issues are only a single page long. As of the third issue, membership stood at only nine persons; circulation of this newsletter would never exceed eighty copies. The fifth issue contained a set of rules called the LGTSA Medieval Miniatures rules which would be expanded and published by Guidon Games as Chainmail in 1971; this being one of the primary predecessors of the original Dungeons & Dragons role-playing game. Issue #9 contained a map of the Great Kingdom, the campaign environment in which the cities of Blackmoor and Greyhawk were first initially developed for the purposes of a C&CS play-by-mail game.

Issue #13 of the Domesday Book published some early details, as well as a map, of Blackmoor from Dave Arneson's first fantasy role-playing campaign in July 1972. This article was reprinted almost verbatim in The First Fantasy Campaign (1977), with slightly altered map art.

== 2008 Relaunch ==
The Castles & Crusades Society officially re-launched as an online society dedicated to supporting and promoting gaming, especially RPGs, in 2008. The Domesday Book was re-launched with new, quarterly editions beginning in April 2008.

== See also ==
- Index to issues of The Domesday Book
