= Dave Arneson =

American game designer (1947–2009)

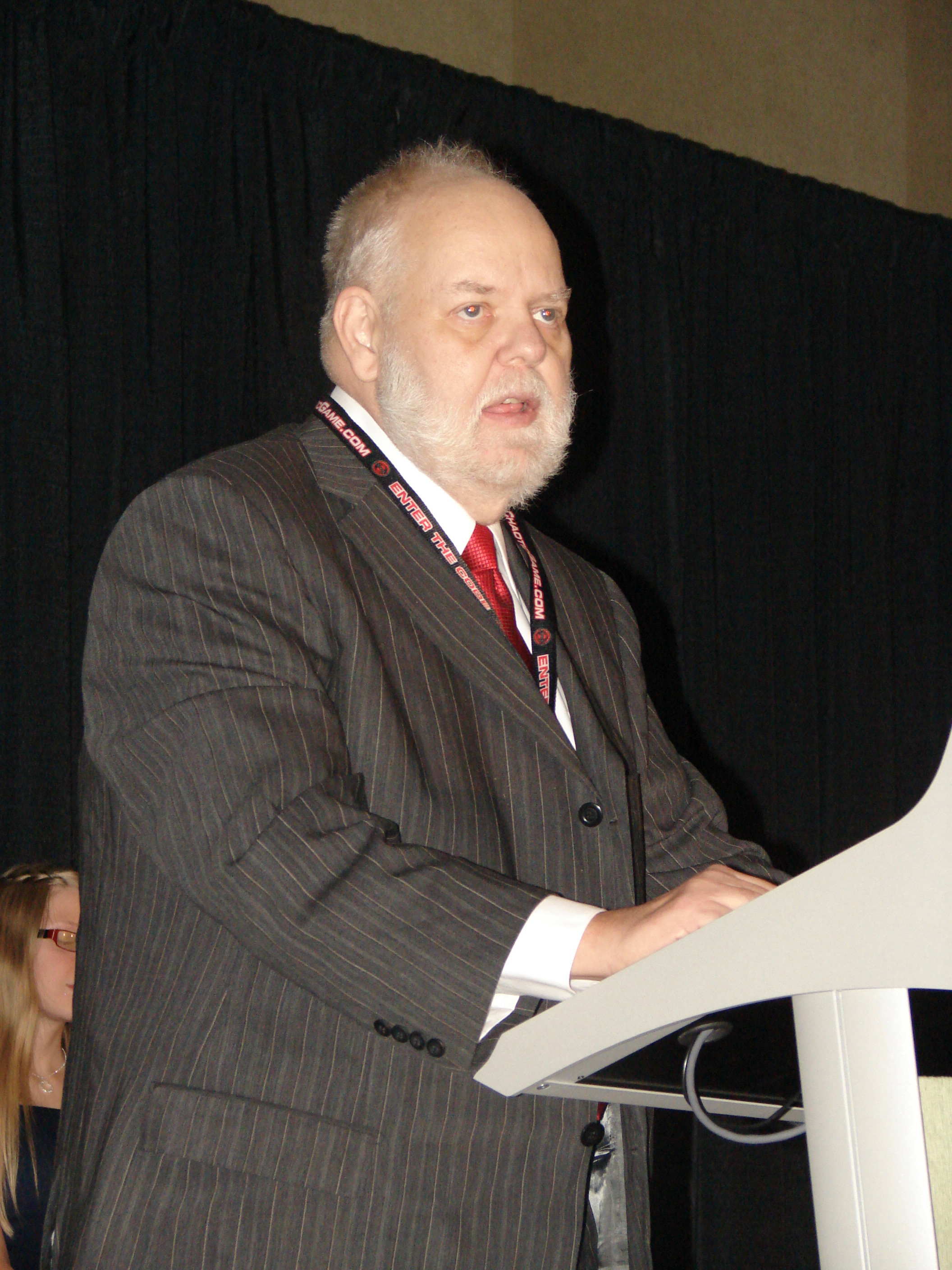
- Arneson in 2008
- Born: David Lance Arneson; October 1, 1947; Hennepin County, Minnesota, U.S.
- Died: April 7, 2009 (aged 61); Saint Paul, Minnesota, U.S.
- Occupation: Game designer
- Spouse: Frankie Ann Morneau (m. 1984)
- Children: 1
- Writing career
- Genre: Role-playing games

David Lance Arneson (/ˈɑːrnɪsən/; October 1, 1947 – April 7, 2009) was an American game designer best known for co-developing the first published role-playing game (RPG), Dungeons & Dragons, with Gary Gygax, in the early 1970s. Arneson's fundamental early role-playing game (RPG) genre work pioneered now-archetypical devices, such as: cooperative play to develop a storyline instead of individual competitive play to "win"; and adventuring in dungeon, town, and wilderness settings as presented by a neutral judge who doubles as the voice and consciousness of all characters aside from the player characters.

Arneson discovered wargaming as a teenager in the 1960s, and he began combining these games with the concept of role-playing. He was a University of Minnesota student when he met Gygax at the Gen Con gaming convention in the late 1960s. In 1971, Arneson created the game and fictional world that became Blackmoor, writing his own rules and basing the setting on medieval fantasy elements. Arneson took the game to Gygax as the representative for game publisher Guidon Games, and the pair co-developed a set of rules that became Dungeons & Dragons (D&D). Gygax and Don Kaye subsequently founded Tactical Studies Rules in 1973, which published Dungeons & Dragons the next year.

Arneson moved to Lake Geneva, Wisconsin to work for TSR Hobbies in 1976, but left before the end of the year. In 1979 Arneson filed suit to retain credits and royalties on the game. He continued to work as an independent game designer, including work submitted to TSR in the 1980s, and continued to play games for his entire life. Arneson also did some work in computer programming, and he taught computer game design and game rules design at Full Sail University from the 1990s until shortly before his death in 2009.

== Experience with miniature wargaming ==
Arneson's role-playing game design work grew from his interest in wargames. His parents bought him the board wargame Gettysburg by Avalon Hill. After Arneson taught his friends how to play, the group began to design their own games, and tried out new ways to play existing games. Arneson was especially fond of naval wargames. Exposure to role-playing influenced his later game designs. In college history classes he role-played historical events and preferred to deviate from recorded history in a manner similar to "what if" scenarios recreated in wargames.

In the late 1960s Arneson joined the Twin Cities Military Miniatures Group, a group of miniature wargamers and military figurine collectors in the Minneapolis-St. Paul area that included among its ranks future game designer David Wesely. Wesely asserts that it was during the Braunstein games he created and refereed, and in which other Twin Cities Military Miniatures Group members participated, that Arneson helped develop the foundations of modern role-playing games on a 1:1 scale basis by focusing on non-combat objectives—a step away from wargaming towards the more individual play and varied challenges of later RPGs. Arneson was a participant in Wesely's wargame scenarios and, as Arneson continued to run his own scenarios, he eventually began to include ideas from sources such as The Lord of the Rings and Dark Shadows. Arneson took over the Braunsteins after Wesely was drafted into the Army, and he often ran these scenarios using different eras and settings. Arneson had also become a member of the International Federation of Wargamers by this time.

In 1969 Arneson was a history student attending the University of Minnesota and working part-time as a security guard. He attended the second Gen Con gaming convention in August 1969 (at which time wargaming was still the primary focus) and it was at this event that he met Gary Gygax, who had founded the Castle & Crusade Society within the International Federation of Wargamers in the 1960s at Lake Geneva, Wisconsin. Arneson and Gygax also shared an interest in sailing ship games and they co-authored the Don't Give Up the Ship naval battle rules, serialized from June 1971 and later published as a single volume in 1972 by Guidon Games with a revised edition by TSR Hobbies in 1975.

== Blackmoor ==
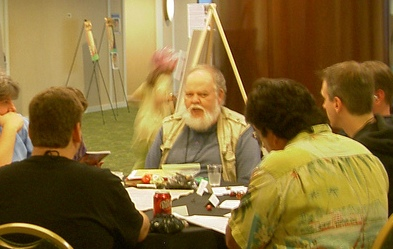
Arneson playing Blackmoor at ConQuesT 2006

Following the departure of David Wesely to service in the Army Reserves in October 1970, Arneson and his fellow players in the Twin Cities began to imagine alternate settings for "Braunstein" games. Arneson developed a Braunstein in which his players played fantasy versions of themselves in the medieval Barony of Blackmoor, a land inhabited in part by fantastic monsters. As the game quickly grew and characters developed, Arneson devised scenarios where they would quest for magic and gold, escort caravans, lead armies for or against the forces of evil, and delve into the dungeons beneath Castle Blackmoor (which was represented by a Kibri kit model of Branzoll Castle). To explain his inspiration for the game, Arneson said:

I had spent the previous two days watching about five monster movies on channel 5's 'Creature Feature' weekend, reading several Conan books (I cannot recall which ones, but I always thought they were all pretty much the same), and stuffing myself with popcorn, doodling on a piece of graph paper. At the time, I was quite tired of my Nappy (Napoleonic) campaign with all its rigid rules and was rebelling against it.

Arneson drew heavily upon the fantasy material in the Chainmail rules, written by Gygax and Jeff Perren and published in the spring of 1971, but after a short and unsatisfactory trial of the Fantasy Combat table found therein, he developed his own mix of rules, including adapted elements from his revision of Civil War Ironclad game. The gameplay would be recognizable to modern D&D players, featuring the use of hit points, armor class, character development, and dungeon crawls. This setting was fleshed out over time and continues to be played to the present day.

Many of the fantasy medieval foundations of D&D, as well as the concept of adventuring in "dungeons" originated with Blackmoor, which also incorporated time travel and science fiction elements. These are visible much later in the DA module series published by TSR (particularly City of the Gods), but were also present from the early to mid-1970s in the original campaign and parallel and intertwined games run by John Snider, whose ruleset developed from these adventures and was intended for publication by TSR from 1974 as the first science fiction RPG. Arneson described Blackmoor as "roleplaying in a non-traditional medieval setting. I have such things as steam power, gunpowder, and submarines in limited numbers. There was even a tank running around for a while. The emphasis is on the story and the roleplaying." Details of Blackmoor and the original campaign, established on the map of the Castle & Crusade Society's "Great Kingdom", were first brought to print briefly in issue #13 of the Domesday Book, the newsletter of the Castle & Crusade Society in July 1972, and later in much-expanded form as The First Fantasy Campaign, published by Judges Guild in 1977.

In February 1973, Dave Arneson and Dave Megarry traveled to Lake Geneva to meet with Gary Gygax, to provide a demonstration of Blackmoor and Dungeon! While meeting at Gygax's house, Dave Arneson ran the Lake Geneva gamers through their first session of Blackmoor. Rob Kuntz describes Dave Arneson as the referee, and the Lake Geneva players as being Gary Gygax, Ernie Gygax, Terry Kuntz, and himself. Kuntz describes Dave Megarry as the de facto leader of the group, as he understood the Blackmoor game and campaign world. In Wargaming magazine, Rob Kuntz wrote a short summary of their first Blackmoor session:

Gary, myself and a few other local wargamers were the first "lucky" fellows from Lake Geneva to experience the rigors of Blackmoor. This idea caught on deeply with Gary after an exciting adventure in which our party of heroes fought a troll, were fireballed by a magic-user, then fled to the outdoors (being chased by the Magic-user and his minions), fought four (gulp!) Balrogs, followed a map to sixteen ogres and destroyed them with a wish from a sword we had procured from the hapless troll earlier.

== Dungeons & Dragons ==
After playing in the Blackmoor game Arneson refereed, Gygax almost immediately began a similar campaign of his own, which he called "Greyhawk", and asked Arneson for a draft of his playing-rules. The two then collaborated by phone and mail, and playtesting was carried out by their various groups and other contacts. Gygax and Arneson wanted to have the game published, but Guidon Games and Avalon Hill rejected it. Arneson could not afford to invest in the venture.

Gygax felt that there was a need to publish the game as soon as possible, since similar projects were being planned elsewhere, so rules were hastily put together, and Arneson's own final draft was never used. Despite all this, Brian Blume eventually provided the funding required to publish the original Dungeons & Dragons set in 1974, with the initial print run of 1,000 selling out within a year and sales increasing rapidly in subsequent years. Further rules and a sample dungeon from Arneson's original campaign (the first published RPG scenario in a professional publication) were released in 1975 in the Blackmoor supplement for D&D, which was named after the campaign setting. Blackmoor presented new character classes for monks and assassins, additional new monsters, and "The Temple of the Frog", the first published role-playing adventure scenario intended for other people to run.

Arneson formally joined TSR as their Director of Research at the beginning of 1976, but left at the end of the year to pursue a career as an independent game designer.

== After TSR ==
In 1977, despite the fact that he was no longer at TSR, Arneson published Dungeonmaster's Index, a 38-page booklet that indexed all of TSR's D&D properties to that point in time.

TSR had agreed to pay Arneson royalties on all D&D products, but when the company came out with Advanced Dungeons & Dragons (AD&D) in 1977, it claimed that AD&D was a significantly different product and so did not pay him royalties for it. In response, Arneson filed the first of five lawsuits against Gygax and TSR in 1979. In March 1981, as part of a confidential agreement, Arneson and Gygax resolved the suits out of court by agreeing that they would both be credited as "co-creators" on the packaging of D&D products from that point on, and Arneson would receive a 2.5% royalty on all AD&D products. This provided him with a comfortable six-figure annual income for the next twenty years. This did not end the lingering tensions between them.

== Continuation of Blackmoor ==
Arneson wrote a new version of the Blackmoor setting for publication by Judges Guild in The First Fantasy Campaign (1977). In 1979 Arneson and Richard L. Snider, an original Blackmoor player, co-authored Adventures in Fantasy, a role-playing game that attempted to recapture the "original spirit of the Role Playing Fantasy Game" that Arneson had envisioned in the early 1970s, instead of what D&D had become. In the early 1980s he established his own game company, Adventure Games – staffed largely by Arneson's friends, most of whom were involved in an American Civil War reenactment group – that published the miniatures games Harpoon (1981) and Johnny Reb (1983), as well as a new edition of his own Adventures in Fantasy role-playing game (1981). The company also published several Tékumel related books, owing to Arneson's friendship with author M. A. R. Barker. Adventure Games was profitable, but Arneson found the workload to be excessive and finally sold the company to Flying Buffalo. Arneson sold the rights to Adventure Games to Flying Buffalo in 1985; because Arneson owned part of Flying Buffalo, he wanted to let them handle the rest of his company's stock and intellectual property after shutting down Adventure Games.

While Gary Gygax was president of TSR in the mid-1980s, he and Arneson reconnected, and Arneson briefly relinked Blackmoor to D&D with the "DA" (Dave Arneson) series of modules set in Blackmoor (1986–1987). Arneson submitted manuscripts which the TSR editing staff reworked to conform to their Mystara campaign setting, crediting Arneson as co-author on three of the four published "DA" series modules. Arneson's projects were dropped from the company before a planned fifth module could be published. In 1986 Arneson wrote a new D&D module set in Blackmoor called "The Garbage Pits of Despair", which was published in two parts in Different Worlds magazine issues #42 and #43. T

Arneson and Dustin Clingman founded Zeitgeist Games to produce an updated d20 System version of the Blackmoor setting. Goodman Games published and distributed Dave Arneson's Blackmoor in 2004, and Goodman published additional products for Blackmoor over the next year. Code Monkey Publishing released Dave Arneson's Blackmoor: The First Campaign (2009) for 4th edition D&D.

== Computer programming and education ==
In 1988, Arneson stated his belief that RPGs, whether paper or computer, were still "hack and slash" and did not teach novices how to play, and that games like Ultima IV "have stood pretty much alone as quirks instead of trend setters" as others did not follow their innovations. He hoped that computer RPGs would teach newcomers how to role play while offering interesting campaigns and said that SSI's Gold Box games did not innovate on the genre as much as he had hoped. Arneson stepped into the computer industry and founded 4D Interactive Systems, a computer company in Minnesota that has since dissolved. He also did some computer programming and worked on several games. He eventually found himself consulting with computer companies. Arneson wrote the 1989 adventure DNA / DOA, the first adventure published for the FASA fantasy/cyberpunk game Shadowrun, which was released the same year.

Living in California in the late 1980s, Arneson had a chance to work with children in special education. Upon returning to Minnesota, he pursued teaching and began speaking at schools about educational uses of role-playing and using multi-sided dice to teach math.

In the 1990s, he began working at Full Sail, a private university that teaches multimedia subjects, and continued there as an instructor of computer game design until 2008. At Full Sail University he taught the class "Rules of the Game", a class in which students learned how to accurately document and create rule sets for games that were balanced between mental challenges for the players and "physical" ones for the characters. He retired from the position on June 19, 2008.

== Other RPG involvements ==
Arneson continued to play games his entire life, including D&D and military miniature games, and regularly attended an annual meeting to play the original Blackmoor in Minnesota.

Arneson wrote for Computer Gaming World magazine in the 1980s and early 1990s. He wrote columns on his opinion of the role-playing game genre and reviews of computer games such as Romance of the Three Kingdoms (1985), Zork Zero (1988), Citadel: Adventure of the Crystal Keep (1989), Uncharted Waters (1990), and Renegade Legion: Interceptor (1990).

During the 1990s, he was invited to Brazil by Devir, a game publisher. He became friends with the owner of the publishing company and he gave him his D&D woodgrain box and some of his books as a gift.

In 1997, after Wizards of the Coast purchased TSR, Peter Adkison paid Arneson an undisclosed sum to free up D&D from royalties that were still owed to Arneson; this allowed Wizards to retitle Advanced Dungeons & Dragons to simply Dungeons & Dragons.

Around 2000, Arneson was working with videographer John Kentner on Dragons in the Basement (unreleased), a video documentary on the early history of role-playing games. Arneson describes the documentary: "Basically it is a series of interviews with original players ('How did D&D affect your life?') and original RPG designers like Marc Miller (Traveller) and M.A.R. Barker (Empire of the Petal Throne)." He also made a cameo appearance in the Dungeons & Dragons movie as one of many mages throwing fireballs at a dragon, although the scene was deleted from the completed movie.

== Personal life ==
Arneson married Frankie Ann Morneau in 1984; they had one daughter, Malia, and two grandchildren.

Arneson died on April 7, 2009, after battling cancer for two years. According to his daughter, Malia Weinhagen, "The biggest thing about my dad's world is he wanted people to have fun in life."

== Honors and tributes ==
Arneson received numerous industry awards for his part in creating Dungeons & Dragons and other role-playing games. In 1984 he was inducted into the Academy of Adventure Gaming Arts and Design's Hall of Fame (also known as the Charles Roberts Awards Hall of Fame) and in 1999 was named by Pyramid magazine as one of The Millennium's Most Influential Persons, "at least in the realm of adventure gaming". He was honored as a "famous game designer" by being featured on the king of hearts in Flying Buffalo's 2008 Famous Game Designers Playing Card Deck.

Three days after his death, Wizards of the Coast temporarily replaced the front page of the Dungeons & Dragons section of their web site with a tribute to Arneson. Other tributes in the gaming world included Order of the Stick #644, and Dork Tower for April 8, 2009. Video game publisher Activision Blizzard posted a tribute to Arneson on their website and on April 14, 2009, released patch 3.1 of the online role-playing game World of Warcraft, The Secrets of Ulduar, dedicated to Arneson.

Turbine's Dungeons and Dragons Online added an in-game memorial altar to Arneson in the Ruins of Threnal location in the game. They also created an in-game item named the "Mantle of the Worldshaper" that is a reward for finishing the Threnal quest chain that is narrated by Arneson himself. The Mantle's description reads: "A comforting and inspiring presence surrounds you as you hold this cloak. Arcane runes run along the edges of the fine cape, and masterfully drawn on the silken lining is an incredibly detailed map of a place named 'Blackmoor'."

On October 30, 2010, Full Sail University dedicated the student game development studio space as "Dave Arneson's Blackmoor Studios" in Arneson's honor.

Since the release of the history of Braunstein in 2008 and Playing at the World in 2012, a scholarly work by Jon Petersen, the role of Dave Wesely and Dave Arneson was restored in the broad conversation on the origins of the tabletop role-playing games. Robert Kuntz published Dave Arneson's True Genius in 2017 and gave interviews to Kotaku to detail how the gameplay of the current tabletop role-playing games was designed by Arneson. In 2019, the documentary The Secrets of Blackmoor presented interviews of the first players of Dave Arneson and acknowledged his innovations.

== Partial bibliography ==
Source: "Dave Arneson Product Listing". RPGNet. Archived from the original on April 6, 2018.

- Don't Give Up the Ship! (1972) (with Gary Gygax and Mike Carr)
- Dungeons & Dragons (1974) (with Gary Gygax)
- Blackmoor (1975)
- Dungeonmaster's Index (1977)
- The First Fantasy Campaign (1977)
- Adventures in Fantasy (1979) (with Richard L. Snider)
- Robert Asprin's Thieves' World (1981) (co-author)
- Citybook II – Port o' Call (1984) (co-author)
- Adventures in Blackmoor (D&D Module:DA1) (1986) (with David J. Ritchie)
- Temple of the Frog (D&D Module:DA2) (1986) (with David J. Ritchie)
- City of the Gods (D&D Module:DA3) (1987) (with David J. Ritchie)
- DNA/DOA (Shadowrun module 1) (1989)
- The Case of the Pacific Clipper (1991)
- The Haunted Lighthouse (Dungeon Crawl Classics Module #3.5) (2003)
- Dave Arneson's Blackmoor (2004) (lead designer)
- Player's Guide to Blackmoor (2006)
