= Operation Greif (game) =

Board game

Cover of the 2nd edition (1981)

Operation Greif is a variant for Avalon Hill's 1965 wargame Battle of the Bulge self-published by Don Lowry in 1970. It is a game recreation of the World War II Operation Greif.

== Historical background ==
During the World War II Battle of the Bulge, Operation Greif (German for Griffin) was a special false flag operation commanded by Waffen-SS commando Otto Skorzeny where German soldiers, wearing captured British and U.S. Army uniforms, attempted to capture bridges over the Meuse River and cause confusion in the Allied rear echelons.

== Description ==
Operation Greif is a two-person variant for the 1965 edition of Battle of the Bulge, later updated to conform to the 1981 edition. Only new counters and rules are provided; the original map board from Battle of the Bulge is required for play.

=== Components ===
The game consists of

- 11" x 17" sheet folded in half to form a 4-page rules folder
- sheet of paper with printout of 313 counters, to be cut apart and glued to 1/2" cardboard counters
- two Order of Battle sheets, one for Allies, one for Germans

== Publication history ==
In 1965, Avalon Hill published Battle of the Bulge, a wargame that simulated the German surprise offensive of December 1944–January 1945. In 1970, game editor Don Lowry designed a variant for the game based on Operation Greif and sold it through his mail order business. Lowry also sold a number of copies to the International Federation of Wargamers (IFW). The IFW subsequently distributed the copies to members via its newsmagazine The International Wargamer.

In 1981, with permission of Lowry, game designer Chester Hendrix published a revised second edition. The same year, Avalon Hill published a new and much revised edition of Battle of the Bulge. Several years later, Hendrix published a third edition of Operation Greif that was updated to the new Bulge rules.

== Reviews ==
- Strategy & Tactics Guide to Conflict Simulation Games, Periodicals and Publications in Print, Issue 1 No. 157
- Panzerfaust Magazine No. 59 (July–August 1973)
