= Jeff Perren =

American game designer

- Occupation: Game designer

Jeff Perren is an American game designer, a hobby shop owner, and an early associate of Gary Gygax.

== Career ==
Jeff Perren was a gamer from Rockport, Illinois, who was involved with miniatures wargaming and had been collecting ancient and medieval miniatures since at least 1963. Perren was an early member of the Lake Geneva Tactical Studies Association along with Gary Gygax, Terry Kuntz and Rob Kuntz, Ernie Gygax, Mike Reese, Leon Tucker, and Don Kaye. Perren created his own set of rules for Siege of Bodenburg, and shared these rules with Gygax. Early in 1970, the LGTSA purchased a considerable number of Elastolin figures, which motivated Perren to develop four pages of his own rules for these miniatures which focused on mass combat. Perren and Gygax created this set of medieval miniatures rules and called it Chainmail, publishing the first set of these rules in a fanzine for the Castle & Crusade Society known as The Domesday Book. Perren and Gygax also designed the miniatures game Cavaliers and Roundheads (1973), which would be the first game published by Gygax's new company TSR.
