= Siege of Bodenburg =

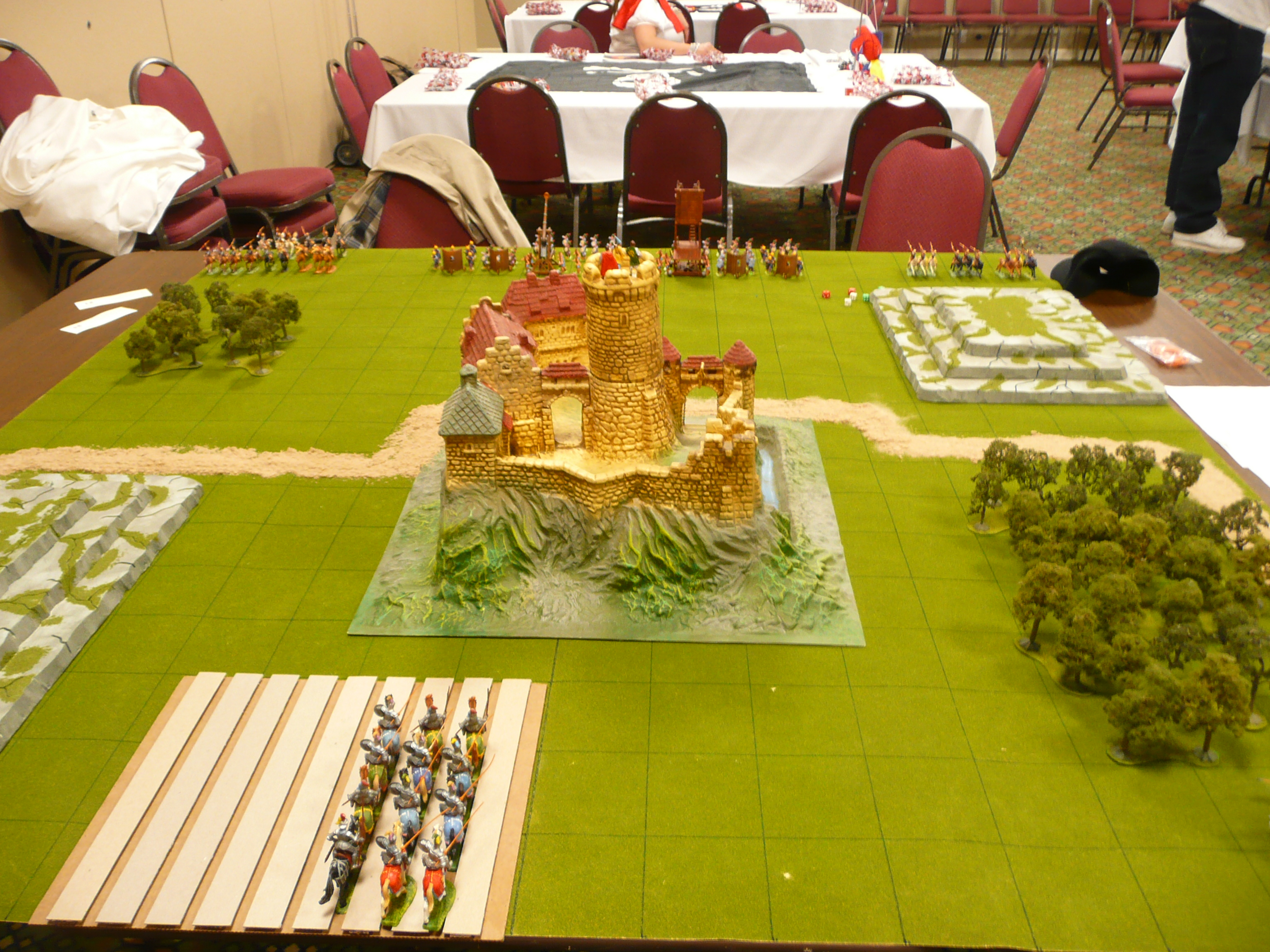
- Designers: Henry Bodenstedt
- Years active: 1967 - early 1970s
- Genres: Medieval military tactics, strategy
- Players: 2+
- Setup time: 30 + minutes

Siege of Bodenburg is a wargame developed in 1967 by Henry Bodenstedt. It is one of the earliest sets of rules for conducting battles with medieval miniatures.

== Publication ==
In 1967 the game was published by Strategy & Tactics magazine in five parts, in issues #6–11. The name of the game is presumably a play on Bodenstedt's own name, though there was an actual medieval castle called Bodenburg south of Hildesheim.

== Gameplay and equipment ==
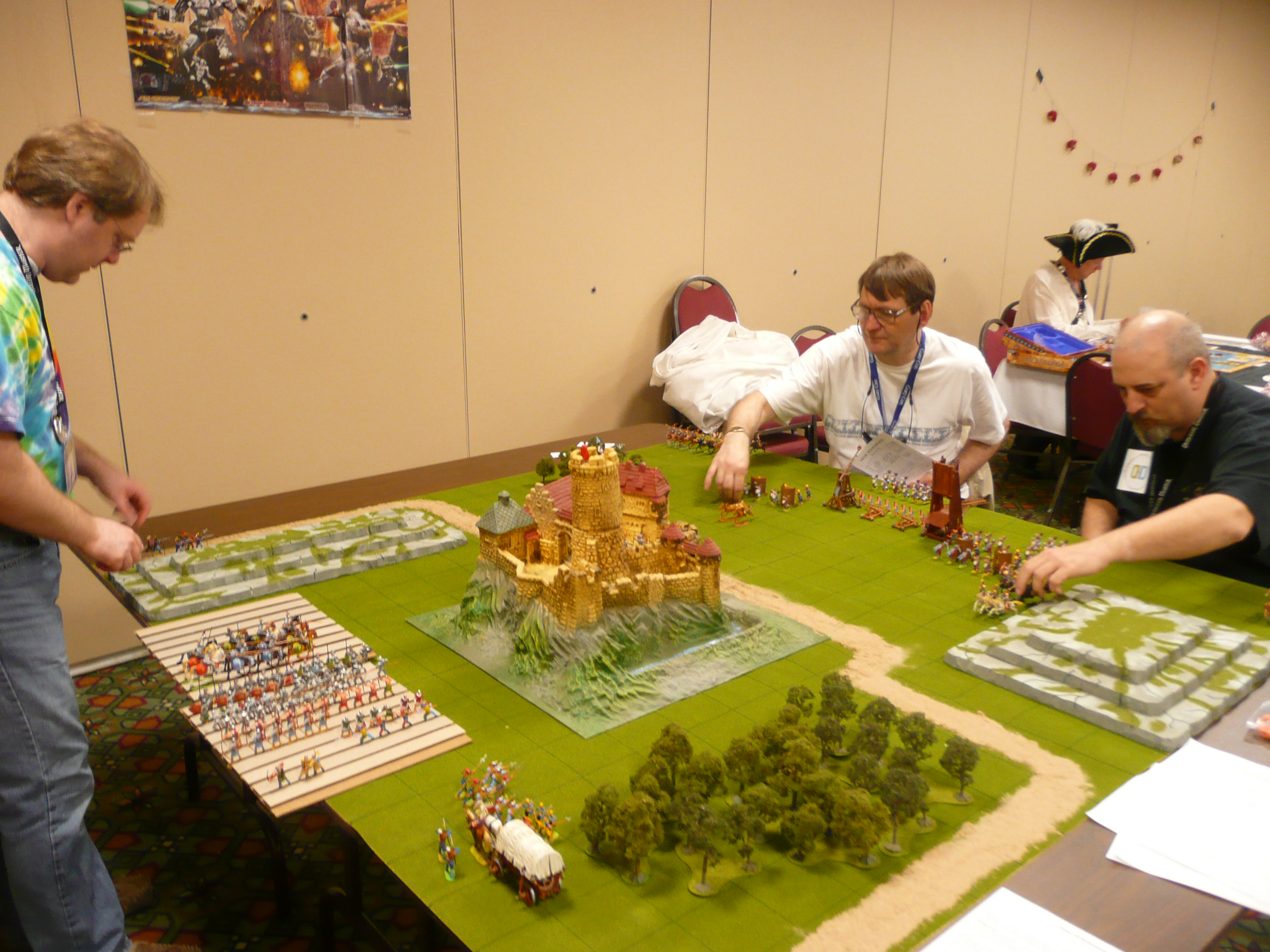
Siege of Bodenburg miniatures and Elastolin castle at Gary Con IV

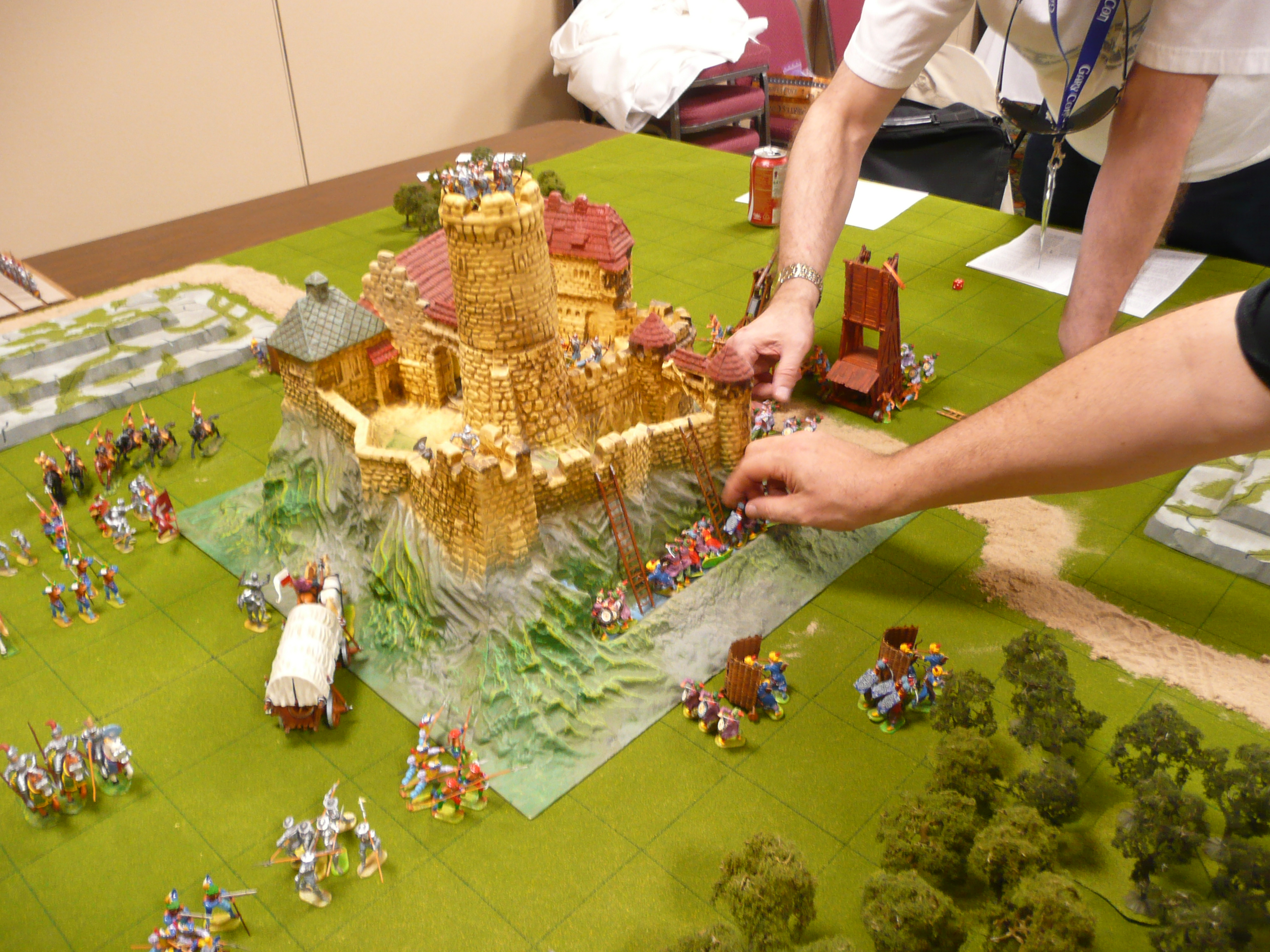
Gameplay at Gary Con IV

The game is played on a tabletop using 40mm medieval Elastolin miniatures manufactured by O&M Hausser. Bodenstedt owned the Continental Hobby Supplies store in Adelphia, New Jersey, and he used the rules to promote the sale of Elastolin miniatures, including the large central castle (Elastolin #9732).

The game requires a 6' by 6' tabletop divided into a grid of 4" by 4" squares. Battle is resolved using a combat results table similar to those used by board wargames such as Tactics II. One player is the defender, and in addition to the castle he has at his disposal 30 footmen, 15 archers, 12 mounted knights, and a supply wagon. The attacker's forces include 40 footmen, 14 archers, 24 mounted Huns, 3 catapults, 4 movable parapets, 4 scaling ladders, and a siege tower. The attacker wins if he eliminates all of the defender's knights or captures the castle within 15 turns. Otherwise the defender wins.

== Gen Con I ==
Siege of Bodenburg was a significant game at Gen Con I in 1968. Although Bodenstedt was unable to travel to Lake Geneva, Wisconsin to stimulate sales of the gaming equipment, Jerry White did so, driving around 2000 miles from Oregon with copies of the Siege of Bodenburg rules, along with equipment for the game. In the International Federation of Wargamers publication, The Spartan, the games of Siege of Bodenburg were described as having an "excellent miniatures set-up", and as having been "played by a large number of persons." Gary Gygax is seen playing Siege of Bodenburg as early as 1968 at Gen Con I.

== Influence ==
Using Siege of Bodenburg as a reference, Jeff Perren developed his own set of medieval wargame rules, and shared them with Gary Gygax, becoming Chainmail.

The Hausser Castle, incidentally, appears in the photographs of miniature battles in Chainmail.
