= Don't Give Up the Ship (game) =

Naval wargame

Rules for the Great Age of Sail
- Cover for the first edition of Don't Give Up the Ship (1972). Artwork by Don Lowry
- Designers: Dave Arneson, Gary Gygax, Mike Carr
- Illustrators: Don Lowry
- Publishers: Guidon Games; TSR, Inc.
- Years active: 1972–1975
- Players: 3–18
- Playing time: six hours

Don't Give Up the Ship is a set of rules for conducting Napoleonic era naval wargames. The game was published by Guidon Games in 1972 and republished by TSR, Inc. in 1975. The game was developed as a collaboration between Dave Arneson, Gary Gygax, and Mike Carr. It was the first collaboration between Dave Arneson and Gary Gygax, the co-authors of Dungeons & Dragons. Mike Carr edited the rules and researched the historical single ship actions that are included as game scenarios.

== History ==
The name comes from the dying words of James Lawrence to the crew of his USS Chesapeake, later stitched into an ensign created by Purser Samuel Hambleton and raised by Commodore Oliver Hazard Perry in the Battle of Lake Erie, during the War of 1812.

In the foreword, Gygax writes about the genesis of the rules:

During 1968 I began to gather material in an attempt to devise some sort of rules to encompass the single-ship actions of the War of 1812, but it soon became apparent that the task was going to require more than an offhand effort [...] it wasn't until next year [1969] at the Lake Geneva wargames convention that things began moving again. There Dave Arneson displayed some of his 1:1200 sailing ship models, and in a subsequent discussion of my attempt he mentioned that his group [the MMSA] in Minneapolis-St. Paul were currently developing just such a set of rules. Thereafter began a long correspondence wherein we exchanged rules and ideas [...] while Mike Carr eventually joined us in order to devise much of the optional rules and arrange the mass of material Dave and I had put together.

June 1971 International Wargamer which contained Don't Give Up the Ship rules

After they met for the first time at Gen Con, they chose to work together on a new game, Don't Give Up the Ship! which focused on their mutual interest in naval battles. By 1971, Arneson and Gygax had produced a draft version of the game. The game was published in 1971, as part of Guidon Games's "Wargaming with Miniatures" line. They circulated the rules at Gen Con that year, and began serializing them in the pages of the International Wargamer. The early rules show a significant debt to Fletcher Pratt's naval wargame system, which Arneson had played heavily in the Twin Cities. Later, in the pages of the International Wargamer, Arneson would also publish a list of fighting ships of the Great Age of Sail for use in naval miniature simulations.

The rules that Gygax and Arneson developed call for pencil and paper, six-sided dice, rulers and protractors, and model ships, ideally of 1:1200 scale. Single ship engagements can be played on a tabletop, but fleet battles require more space. Arneson had previously played Fletcher Pratt wargames on a classroom floor at the University of Minnesota, and the distances in Don't Give Up the Ship also exceed the dimensions of a tabletop.

Wind speed and direction are determined by a roll of the dice; sail ships can only make slow progress against the wind by tacking. A protractor is used to measure the angle between the wind direction and the ship direction, and this determines ship speed.

The protractor is also called into use to determine which cannons can fire on an enemy ship. Cannons can aim at the masts or at the hull, and the chance of hitting is 5 in 6 at short range (4") and 1 in 6 at long range (16"). The amount of damage from a hit is determined by the weight of the cannonball.

The rules are elaborate and cover morale, sinking, fires, broken masts, and boarding. The conclusion of the book provides the statistics necessary to re-enact historical encounters such as took place between the USS Constitution and HMS Guerriere on August 19, 1812. The second edition adds 4 pages of simplified rules for battles between fleets, as well as a map for the Battle of Trafalgar. However, detailed scenario information is not included to reproduce the battle.

The original Guidon Games edition of Don't Give Up the Ship also included a detachable sheet to detail the qualities of ships and track their state through the game. This served as a precedent for later character sheets in role-playing games pioneered by Arneson and Gygax.

== Ships of the Line ==
Dave Arneson developed a set of naval campaign rules for the Great Age of Sail called Ships of the Line which he intended as a sequel to Don't Give Up the Ship. It collected many of the naval rules from Arneson's ongoing Napoleonic campaign, as documented in his fanzine Corner of the Table. From a September 1972 introduction written by Gary Gygax which is attached to surviving drafts, it would appear that Guidon Games originally planned to publish Ships of the Line. In 1975, TSR Hobbies added Ships of the Line to its product roadmap, and the title is listed as forthcoming in some TSR advertisements of the day, for example in Strategic Review #3. However, no published edition of Ships of the Line ever appeared. Arneson distributed some photocopies to local gamers in the Twin Cities and to remote play-by-post participants in his Napoleonic campaign.

Another planned TSR title, Naval Orders of Battle, aimed to provide statistics on ships of the Great Age of Sail, compiling work which Arneson published in the International Federation of Wargaming zine the International Wargamer in 1972. It too never appeared.

== Legacy ==
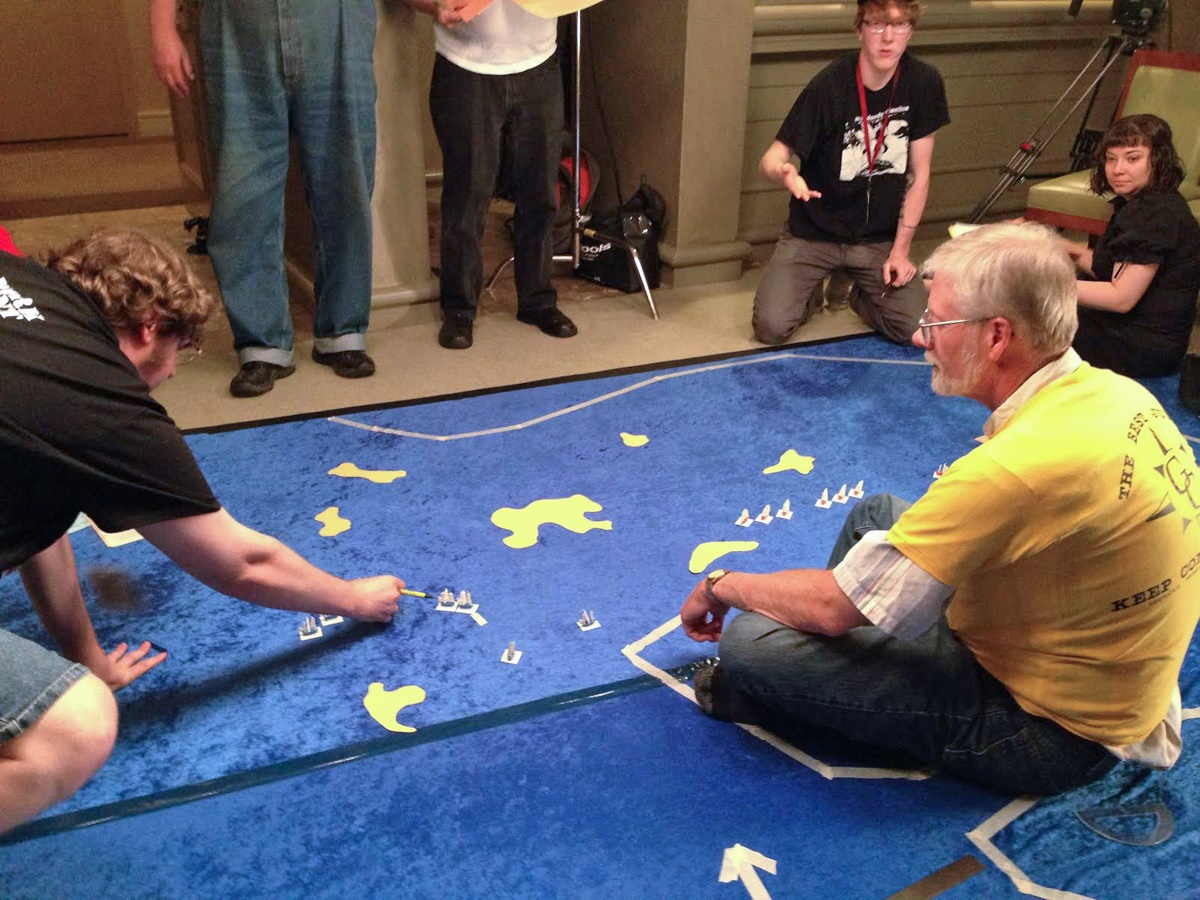
Mike Carr (in yellow) runs Don't Give Up the Ship at Gen Con 2013

Although Don't Give Up the Ship has been out of print for decades, it is still played and studied, due to the high profiles of the game's creators. Mike Carr himself has run the game for groups at gaming conventions in 2013 and 2014, including Gen Con and GaryCon.

== Editions ==
- 1st edition, 1972, Guidon Games, 50 pages, blue & black cover
- 2nd edition, 1975, TSR, Inc., 58 pages, blue, white & black cover

== Reviews ==
- Panzerfaust and Campaign #72
