= Tractics =

Rules for WWII Miniatures
- 1975 TSR edition
- Designers: Mike Reese, Leon Tucker and Gary Gygax
- Publishers: Guidon Games, TSR, Inc.
- Years active: 1971, 1975 - 1977, 2021 - Present
- Genres: Military tactics, strategy

Tractics: Rules for WWII Miniatures is a set of wargaming rules for conducting World War II style combat with 1:285 scale micro armour miniatures. It was originally written to use 1/87 scale miniatures which were easily available at the time of its writing. Written by Mike Reese and Leon Tucker with contributions by Gary Gygax, the game was published by Guidon Games in 1971 and republished by TSR, Inc. in 1975.

== Product overview ==
It came as a boxed set containing three booklets with illustrations by Don Lowry. It has the distinction of being the first published game to use a 20-sided die. TSR printed about 5,000 copies of the game and then let it go out of print in 1977.

The name of the game recalls the popular Avalon Hill board wargame Tactics II (1958). Although World War II style combat was popular with board wargamers, few miniature wargamers were enacting World War II battles in the mid-1960s, in part because appropriate miniatures were scarce. In 1968 Reese and Tucker, two members of the LGTSA, began play-testing rules for tank combat that would eventually form the core of Tractics. Gygax contributed some rules on infantry, covered in the second booklet, and the third booklet would cover additional topics such as airstrikes and the MODERN period (which at the time included rumors of the XM-1 tank).

Mike Reese authorized a new edition December 2021 that combines the Classic Rules of 1971, Modifications of 1976 from Little Wars magazine and his new Updates. It is available from www.combatrules.com/tracticsrules. There is a PDF version and eight identical print versions apart from binding (softcover, hardcover, coil), and shape of game reference charts (landscape or portrait), and interior pages (black ink or full color).

== Gameplay ==
The rules are for the dedicated wargaming enthusiast. The players must first acquire the miniatures and build the terrain. Reese and Tucker were interested in an accurate simulation, and as a result the game provides data describing the rate of movement, thickness of armor, and rate of fire for the makes of tank in service from 1940 to 1970. The game is consequently slower to conduct than a board wargame such as Tactics II. For miniature wargamers who felt that the amount of detail was excessive, Reese and Tucker recommended their earlier Fast Rules (1970) although that set covered World War II only.

Tractics is not a perfect information game and requires the use of a judge. A player does not initially know where his enemy is located, and pieces are placed in the playing area only when they come into open view or are detected by active observation. Tanks have a base 30% chance (i.e. must roll a 15 or higher on a 20-sided die) to hit a target. Modifiers apply depending upon factors such as how well the target is concealed.
