= Cavaliers and Roundheads =

Board game

The English Civil War
- Cavaliers and Roundheads (1973)
- Designers: Gary Gygax and Jeff Perren
- Publishers: Tactical Studies Rules

Cavaliers and Roundheads is a set of rules for English Civil War miniature wargaming. It was written by Gary Gygax and Jeff Perren and published by Tactical Studies Rules (later TSR, Inc.) in 1973. The unassuming booklet was the first product released by the company better known for Dungeons & Dragons.

== History ==
Cavaliers and Roundheads (1973), a miniatures game by Gary Gygax and Jeff Perren, was the first game published by Tactical Studies Rules. TSR partners Gygax and Don Kaye had originally planned to use the revenue generated by this game to finance the publication of D&D.

== Gameplay ==
The basic troop types are pikemen, heavy infantry, musketeers, cavalry, and lobsters. Six-sided dice are used exclusively, and melee is resolved like in Chainmail, a ruleset Gygax and Perren also collaborated on. The booklet is 36 pages long, with illustrations by Greg Bell.

== See also ==
- Cavalier
- Roundhead
