= Fast Rules =

Fast Rules (1972)

Fast Rules is a simple, playable ruleset for conducting table top wargames with H0 scale World War II miniatures using armor, artillery, and infantry and classed as a "mid-level skirmish" wargame. The rules were developed by Mike Reese and Leon Tucker, and published as a 24 page pamphlet in 1970 by the Armored Operations Society, an affiliate of the IFW. Guidon Games made a second printing in 1972, and a third printing at an unknown later date. Combat Rules released a full-color, authorized edition in 2021 with a few additions. Compared to the original 5.5x8.5" edition, it has 24 6.14x9.21" pages.

The basic target types are buildings, tanks, armored personnel carriers, trucks, cars, guns, and men. Two six-sided dice are rolled to determine whether a hit is made, with the number needed to score a hit depending upon the target type. The chance of hitting increases with each consecutive attempt, and if a hit is scored a second roll is made to determine if the target is destroyed. When opposing infantry come into contact with each other, each man rolls a single six-sided die to determine survival.

These were compiled primarily to introduce collectors of small-scale military miniatures to the hobby of conducting small battles with their collections. The authors aimed for simplicity, intending that the rules be easy to learn and quick to use. The rules focus on aspects of combat considered fundamental to the Second World War, omitting many finer details. Players require only a modest collection of miniature vehicles and figures, the rulebook, a pair of dice, and a tape measure or ruler marked in feet and inches

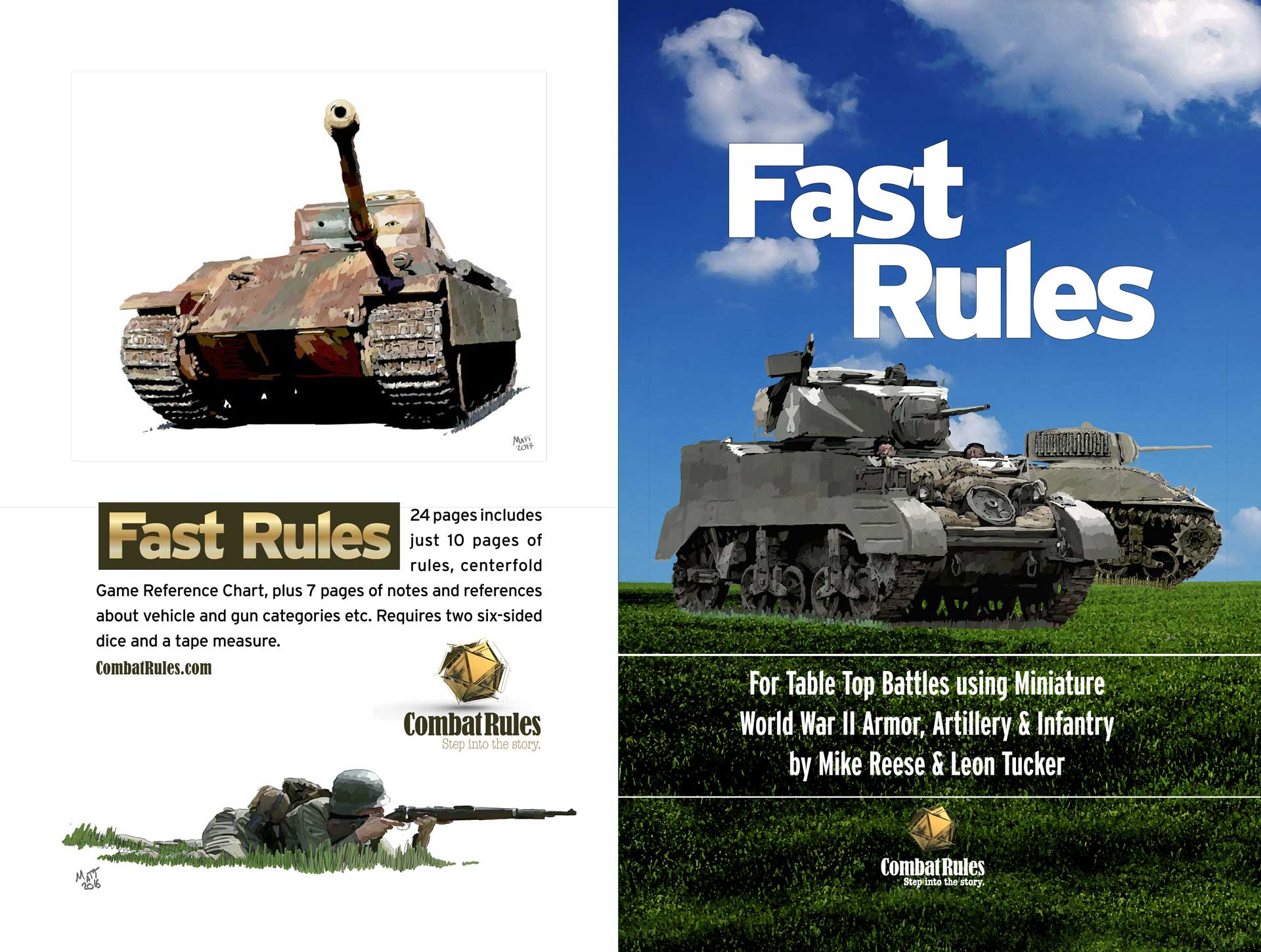
Covers of Fast Rules 2021 edition

Fast Rules is not a perfect information game. A player must actively seek out his opponent's pieces, which are not placed on the battlefield until they are detected.

Reese and Tucker also wrote Tractics, a more elaborate set of rules for World War II miniatures.
