= Tower Chaos =

Role-playing game supplement

- Character levels: 9-12
- Authors: Robert J. Kuntz
- First published: 1987

Tower Chaos is a fantasy role-playing game adventure module.

== Plot summary ==
Tower Chaos is a scenario for character levels 9–12, third in the "Maze of Zayene" series. The heroes try again to assassinate mad King Orr, who is now protected in Tower Chaos. Dimensions of Flight proceeds this scenario; The Eight Kings is the sequel.

== Publication history ==
Tower Chaos was written by Robert Kuntz, and was published by Creations Unlimited, Inc., in 1987 as a 32-page book.

This adventure was part of the Maze of Zayene series, a set of four linked adventures set in the World of Kalibruhn; Kuntz began to work on them in 1986, and they were all published in 1987. Prisoners of the Maze and Dimensions of Flight were based on adventures that Kuntz had created while he was in college and that had been run in 1983 at EastCon.

When Kuntz partnered with Necromancer Games years later, he was considering his unpublished City of Brass but decided it would be easier to begin the Maze of Zayene. However, there was a publication delay of several month between the first two Zayene adventures. While the first three Maze of Zayene adventures were published by Necromancer in 2001, the final fourth adventure was ultimately published by Different Worlds in 2004.

== Reception ==
According to Shannon Appelcline, although the adventures of the Maze of Zayene series "were unforgiving 'gauntlets' of the type that Kuntz enjoyed, they were somewhat unusual for the time because they had a political veneer laid out upon them – centring on a plot to assassinate a king. They also feature the evil wizard Zayene, who Kuntz intended to be a recurring villain, constantly returning to bedevil players."
