= Tricolor (disambiguation) =

Tricolor or tricolour (from Latin tri- "three" and color "colour"), or tricolored, tricoloured, may refer to:

== Flags ==
- Tricolor, the flags of three bands adopted in the revolutionary republicanist movements of the late 18th and 19th centuries, specifically
  - Tiranga, the flag of India
  - Le Tricolore, the flag of France
  - Il Tricolore, the flag of Italy
  - Триколор, the flag of Russia
  - Yeřaguyn, Եռագույն, the flag of Armenia
  - Trobojnica, the flag of Croatia
  - the flag of Yemen, introduced in 1990
  - the flag of Venezuela, introduced in 2006
  - the flag of Mexico, a vertical tricolor with the national coat of arms charged in the center
  - the flag of Ireland, frequently referred to as the Irish tricolour
  - the flag of Colombia, a horizontal tricolor with a 2:1:1 ratio
  - La Tricolor, the flag of the Second Spanish Republic

== Sports teams ==
- Tricolor, the nickname of various Latin American football teams:
  - Colombia national football team
  - Costa Rica national football team
  - Ecuador national football team
  - Mexico national football team
  - Fluminense Football Club (Tricolor carioca),
  - São Paulo Futebol Clube (Tricolor paulista),
  - Grêmio Foot-Ball Porto Alegrense (Imortal Tricolor)
  - Esporte Clube Bahia (Tricolor baiano)
  - Santa Cruz Futebol Clube (Tricolor do Arruda)
  - Club Nacional de Football
  - Club Nacional
- Tricolor, the nickname of basketball team Quilmes de Mar del Plata
- The Tricolours, a nickname for the National Rugby League team the Sydney Roosters
- Unirea Tricolor București, a former Romanian football club from Bucharest

== Other ==
- Trichromacy, the use of three intensities for the perception and representation of color
- Tricolor (company), American sub-prime auto lender and used car retailer
- Tricolor (dog), a dog with three coat colors
- Tricolor (game), a rulebook for wargaming with Napoleonic miniatures
- Tricolor TV, the biggest Russian satellite television operator
- MV Tricolor, a Norwegian ship that sank in the English Channel in 2002
- Tricolor River, a river of Paraná state in southern Brazil
- Ulmus × hollandica 'Tricolor', an elm cultivar
- a common sage (Salvia officinalis), cultivar

== See also ==
- Tricoloured (horse), a horse with three coat colours
- Tricolore (disambiguation)
- Tricolorii, the nickname of the Romania national football team
- Bi-color (disambiguation)
- Driekleur trikot
