= The First Fantasy Campaign =

Role-playing games supplement

- Writers: Dave Arneson
- Publishers: Judges Guild
- Publication: 1977
- Genres: Role-playing

The First Fantasy Campaign is a supplement for fantasy role-playing games written by Dave Arneson and published by Judges Guild in 1977.

== Description ==
Dave Arneson created a new type of game in 1970, something he called "Blackmoor". After he demonstrated his game to Gary Gygax in 1972, Gygax proposed that the two of them work together to codify a set of rules for a new game, which subsequently became Dungeons & Dragons. Gygax also founded TSR to publish the original set of rules in 1974. The following year, TSR published Blackmoor, which outlined supplemental rules for D&D and included Arneson's sample adventure "Temple of the Frog"; however, despite its title, Blackmoor contained very little information about Arneson's Blackmoor campaign world.

Arneson came to work at TSR in 1976 as Director of Research, but he and Gygax had very different visions of role-playing, and the creative differences between the two proved irreconcilable. Arneson left TSR at the end of 1976, and immediately started working to produce role-playing material. One was the self-published Dungeonmaster's Index (1977); the other was The First Fantasy Campaign, a book published by Judges Guild in which Arneson described details of his world of Blackmoor.

Despite the cover, which stated the book was 88 pages, it was actually a 96-page book, with illustrations by Pixie Bledsaw, Ken Simpson and Arneson, and two large maps drawn by Arneson.

The book includes:

- A listing of the various armies in Blackmoor, and summaries of kingdom management, including road construction, building ships, the costs of exploration, farming, etc. As game historian James Maliszewksi noted, the book is "a fascinating reminder that D&D's roots are in wargaming and not just in a vague 'it's about killing bad guys and taking their stuff' sort of way. As presented in this book, Blackmoor was at least in part an honest-to-goodness exercise in strategy and tactics by the players, as the armies of good and evil contended to determine the fate of the northern provinces of the Great Kingdom."
- "Blackmoor's More Infamous Characters", both heroes and villains
- Details and a map of the village of Blackmoor, including the home of Mello the Halfling and the tower of Svenson's Freehold
- The baronies and villages of the surrounding region
- The upper works of Blackmoor Castle, as well as the first ten levels of the dungeons beneath the castle. (The book states there are at least 15 more levels, although these were never published)
- Four levels of dungeons under a ruin called Glendower.
- A collection of various unrelated pieces, including
  - a list of magic swords
  - the use of magic in Blackmoor
  - earning experience points
  - several more maps
  - expanded rules for other monster such as dragons and vampires.
  - alternate rules for using miniatures in play.

In his 2014 book Designers & Dragons, Shannon Appelcline commented, "Amidst rules and army listings, readers learned some facts about the Kingdom, received information on some notable personalities, and got a look at Blackmoor Town, Blackmoor Castle, and Blackmoor Dungeon. There were also some maps of more distant lands, which would have to be enough to keep players content for several years."

James Maliszewksi pointed out that there's no actual set of rules for how to play in Blackmoor, saying, "for all this information, it's unclear what rules set Dave and his players used to adjudicate these battles. One assumes Chainmail but that's not a certainty."

== Publication history ==
The book was published by Judges Guild in 1977, and went through three printings. However, this was the last work by Arneson that Judges Guild produced.

== Reception ==
In the October-November 1977 issue of White Dwarf (Issue #3), Don Turnbull gave a strong recommendation to this book, saying, "To designers of outdoor adventure universes, this is a must. Time has not permitted me to study every detail, but the booklet is brimful of ideas ranging from farm management to the cost and labour of building roads."

Patrick Amory reviewed First Fantasy Campaign for Different Worlds magazine and stated that "Many of the guidelines are oriented towards wargames and miniatures play, as that is what Blackmoor developed from. I cannot believe that anyone would not be interested in this aid. It presents a far more detailed area for play than anything else in the Fantasy Universe."

Shannon Appelcline commented that "The First Fantasy Campaign (1977) was written by none other than Dave Arneson. It was written as part of his attempt to get back into the RPG business following his departure from TSR — a brief renaissance where he also worked with Heritage Models to produce the Dungeonmaster’s Index (1977). Not only did The First Fantasy Campaign offer a new fantasy campaign setting, but the setting was Dave Arneson's Blackmoor. Unfortunately, Blackmoor wasn't quite presented as its own world, because it connected to the Wilderlands along one map edge — a theme that would continue through all of Blackmoor's appearances for the next 25 years. Sadly, Arneson and Judges Guild never released anything beyond this first book."

RPG Geek notes that "Although fascinating for anyone with an interest in the history of the RPG hobby, the First Fantasy Campaign supplement is very loosely organized and may disappoint readers who are hoping for a fully fleshed out campaign setting."
