= Tricolore =

Tricolore, the French and Italian spelling of tricolour, may refer to:

- The flag of France
  - Fortaleza EC, Brazilian club that have its colors and one of its nicknames after the flag of France
- The flag of Italy
- Tricolore (ballet), a 1978 ballet by Peter Martins, Jean-Pierre Bonnefoux and Jerome Robbins
- Tricolore (album), a 2013 album by Derbyshire indie band Haiku Salut
- Adidas Tricolore, the official football of the 1998 World Cup
- Le Tricolore de Montréal, a soccer team
- Montreal Canadiens, a Canadian hockey team, nicknamed Le Tricolore

== See also ==
- Tricolor (disambiguation)
