= Atlanta (board game) =

American Civil War board wargame

Atlanta Civil War Campaign Game is an American Civil War board wargame published by Guidon Games in 1973.

== Description ==
Atlanta Civil War Campaign Game is a two-player or two-team wargame that simulates the series of battles in 1864 known as the Battle of Atlanta. The boxed set includes

- 18.75" x 25" two-color hex grid map
- 240 counters
- two sets of 6 battle cards (one for defense, the other for attack)
- rulebook

The players can choose to play individual battles (Rocky Face Ridge, Pumpkin Vine Creek, Kennesaw Mountain, or Peachtree Creek), or can play all of them as an extended campaign.

== Publication history ==
Atlanta Civil War Campaign Game was designed by Guidon Games owner Don Lowry, and published by Guidon Games in 1973.

== Reviews ==
- Conflict Issue #7 (June 1974)
- Fire & Movement Issue #19 (Oct./Nov. 1979)
