= Don Lowry =

Wargamer, businessman, illustrator

Don Lowry is a wargamer, businessman, illustrator, and game designer who is best known as the publisher of Chainmail and the editor of Panzerfaust Magazine.

Lowry was active in the International Federation of Wargaming in the late 1960s and ran a mail order business called "Lowry's Hobbies" with his wife Julie. In 1970 he produced a supplement to the Avalon Hill game Battle of the Bulge called Operation Greif which was distributed via the IFW newsletter. In 1971 he started a publishing imprint called Guidon Games which produced rulebooks for miniature wargaming and board wargames, and he tapped Gary Gygax to serve as editor. Lowry designed two of the games, Ironclad and Atlanta, himself and provided the illustrations for some of the other games.

Lowry's mail order business was originally in Evansville, Indiana, but he relocated to Belfast, Maine, in 1972. The same year he acquired Panzerfaust Magazine from Don Greenwood and took over as editor. Lowry declined to publish Dungeons & Dragons, which motivated Gygax to found TSR, Inc. TSR would republish some of the Guidon titles, and the Guidon board game Alexander the Great was picked up by Avalon Hill.

By 1975 Lowry moved his company, now called "Lowry's Enterprises", to Fallbrook, California. That year he designed a set of rules for Napoleonic miniatures called Grand Army and released it under his Panzerfaust Publications imprint. Panzerfaust magazine was renamed Campaign in 1976, and Lowry published it as late as 1982.

He holds, or has held, the copyrights to Alexander the Great, Chainmail: rules for medieval miniatures, and Dunkirk, the Battle of France, all with Gary Gygax.

Lowry is the author of a four volume history of the final year of the civil war published in the early 1990s. The four volumes are entitled "No Turning Back", March–June 1864, "Fate of the Country", June–September 1864, "Dark and Cruel War", September–December 1864, and "Towards an Indefinite Shore", December 1864 – May 1865. These volumes are noteworthy in the way the author describes Grant's strategy as an interconnected whole across the fronts of the war, and similarly ties together events across the country with a chronological history on a nearly day by day basis. The volumes are also noteworthy in Lowry's reporting acts of violence by confederate troops against blacks serving in the union army much more comprehensively, based on the available historical record, than most other accounts. Lowry was also a newspaper editor in Fallbrook, California.
