= Garden of the Plantmaster =

Fantasy role-playing game scenario

- Cover art by Bill Taylor
- Designers: Robert J. Kuntz
- Illustrators: Bill Taylor
- Publishers: Creations Unlimited
- Publication: 1987
- Genres: Fantasy

Garden of the Plantmaster is a fantasy role-playing game (FRPG) adventure originally created in the mid-1970s by Robert J. Kuntz for Gary Gygax's home Dungeons & Dragons campaign set in Castle Greyhawk. After revision to make it a standalone adventure, it was published by Creations Unlimited in 1987. Although the adventure is not specifically licensed for any particular role-playing game system, it is compatible with the rules for Advanced Dungeons & Dragons.

== Plot summary ==
Garden of the Plantmaster is a scenario set in a demonic garden in an alien world. The heroes must stop the demon who has taken control of the garden from releasing its monsters into the world. The adventure includes 20 new monsters.

== Publication history ==
This adventure had originally been developed by Robert Kuntz as a special level in the original Castle Greyhawk dungeons that Kuntz co-refereed with Gary Gygax in 1973–1975. Kuntz then revised it for his campaign Lost City of the Elders and it was also closely tied to the TSR publication Mordenkainen's Fantastic Adventure.

Kuntz founded Creations Unlimited in 1987, and used it to release five of his fantasy adventures. The fifth and last was Garden of the Plantmaster, a 72-page softcover book with cover art and illustrations by Bill Taylor.

Kenzer & Company reprinted the adventure as Garden of the Plant Master in 2003.

== Reception ==
In Issue 9 of White Wolf (1989), Stewart Wieck was disappointed, writing "Unfortunately, I must say that GP is among Mr. Kuntz's poorer works ... There is very little by way of plot and the fashion in which characters might become involved in the adventure is a little contrived." Wieck admitted, "some of the encounters are very interesting, but these cannot save the adventure as a whole." However, Wieck thought, as a sourcebook of resource material for a gamemaster, this book was "wonderful. It details vast quantities of flora and fauna. It could be an immeasurable help while developing an outdoors adventure." Because of these two opinions, Wieck gave the adventure two ratings, a 3 out of 10 and a 8 out of 10, saying, "[The first number] is representative of the adventure, but the second (higher) number represents GP's worth as a sourcebook. Mr. Kuntz has proven that he is capable of better works than this. Creations Unlimited says that they are 'the new wave in FRP games', so perhaps once the current gets moving a tidal wave will result."

In Issue 43 of Abyss, Jon Schuller also expressed disappointment, finding that this adventure was at least a decade out of date, calling it "pretty much traditional D&D-type balderdash." Schuller found the entire setting "amazingly contrived ... Nothing about this adventure is logical." Schuller did like the section of the book on herbal medicine, and noted, "There are some nice little bits here and there ... but as an adventure it is a throwback and virtually unplayable unless you run a campaign with very little emphasis on reality." Schuller concluded, "it is up to your judgement whether those small rewards are worth picking up this module for anything more than the nostalgia value."
