= DNA / DOA =

Cover art by John Zeleznik, 1989

DNA / DOA is the first published adventure for the near-future cyberpunk role-playing game Shadowrun, released by FASA in 1989. Written by Dave Arneson, the co-creator of Dungeons & Dragons, Stephan Wieck criticized it for being more like a D&D adventure than a modern high-tech cyberpunk scenario.

== Plot summary ==
DNA / DOA is an adventure in which the player character Runners are hired to break into a lab via a city sewer to steal data from Aztechnology. However, the Runners discover that the lab is over-run by mutagenic experiments, and a terrorist cell also wants the data. When the break-in goes awry, the Runners take shelter in the sewers underneath Tacoma, where they must negotiate with the Orks who live there.

== Publication history ==
In 1989, FASA published the Shadowrun role-playing game. DNA / DOA, the first adventure created for the game, was written by D&D co-designer Dave Arneson, with additional material by Kent Stolt, artwork by Dana Andrews, Tim Bradstreet, Rick Harris, Todd F. Marsh, and Jim Nelson, and cover art by John Zeleznik. It was published by FASA in 1989 as a 64-page book.

== Reception ==
Most reviewers noted the strong flavor of Dungeons & Dragons in the cyberpunk adventure.

In the April–May 1990 edition of White Wolf (Issue #20), Stephan Wieck believed that the adventure, with its extended time in sewers, was more like a D&D dungeon crawl than a modern cyberpunk data theft. He did admit that for players more used to AD&D "The adventure's dungeon atmosphere will make the characters feel more at home while still introducing them to some aspects of Shadowrun." He concluded by giving it a below-average rating of only 2 out of 5 overall.

In the May 1990 edition of Games International, Lee Brimmicombe-Wood noted that "In outline, the adventure is little more than a high-tech dungeon and suffers the limitations of being such." He also criticized the game for being "combat heavy and shows little originality with its opponents." However, he did admit that "there is enough shady dealing going on to keep the scenario interesting." He concluded by giving the adventure an average rating of 7 out of 10, saying, "one of the first adventures to integrate the game's high fantasy and cyberpunk origins rather than tack one on the other. Nice try."

In the French magazine Casus Belli, Mathias Twardowski noted that Dave Arneson, more widely known for his work on D&D, was the author and commented, "DNA/DOA had a lot of trouble getting published and we understand why when we read it: it's a disaster! The characters find themselves in a maze of underground corridors, with tables of wandering monster to provide a little animation." Twardowski concluded, "Obviously, Dave Arneson got stuck in the monster-treasure stage. May he do everyone a favor and write only for his own game."

== Other reviews ==
- Games Review Vol. 2 Issue 4 (Jan 1990)
- Fantasywelt #36 (Sep/Oct 1992, "Spielkiste")
