= Citadel: Adventure of the Crystal Keep =

1989 video game

- Developer(s): Postcraft International, Inc.
- Platform(s): Macintosh
- Release: 1989

Citadel: Adventure of the Crystal Keep is a fantasy adventure video game developed by Postcraft International, Inc. and released in 1989. The game was developed for the Macintosh.

== Plot ==
The player must rescue Lady Synd from a citadel, where the wizard Nequilar holds her captive.

== Reception ==
The game was reviewed in 1990 in Dragon #155 by Hartley, Patricia, and Kirk Lesser in "The Role of Computers" column. The reviewers gave the game 5 out of 5 stars. Dave Arneson for Computer Gaming World called Citadel "very disappointing". The magazine liked its graphics and audio, but described the story as "run-of-the-mill" and the combat as poor.

== Reviews ==
- Compute!
