= Creations Unlimited =

Game publisher founded by Robert J. Kuntz

Creations Unlimited was a game publisher founded by Robert J. Kuntz, which published role-playing games in the 1980s.

== History ==
Robert J. Kuntz left TSR when Gary Gygax was forced out of the company, and retained the rights to his intellectual property for his fictional world of Kalibruhn as he never signed them over to anyone. Kuntz started a new company of his own to hold the rights to his creations, and thus formed Creations Unlimited in 1986. Through this company he produced a linked set of four adventures known as The Maze of Zayene series: Part 1: Prisoners of the Maze (1987), Part 2: Dimensions of Flight (1987), Part 3: Tower Chaos (1987) and Part 4: The Eight Kings (1987); Kuntz created the first two adventures while he was at college, and he later ran them at EastCon in 1983. The company's fifth and final publication was Garden of the Plantmaster (1987); while Kuntz had other adventures he wanted to publish through Creations Unlimited (RPGA tournament adventure "(To the) City of Brass", and "Hidden Realms of Zayene"), these were never printed by the company.

== Releases ==
The company published five adventures/supplements before shutting its doors in 1988:

- The Maze of Zayene, Part 1: Prisoners of the Maze (1987)
- The Maze of Zayene, Part 2: Dimensions of Flight (1987)
- The Maze of Zayene, Part 3: Tower Chaos (1987)
- The Maze of Zayene, Part 4: The Eight Kings (1987)
- Garden of the Plantmaster (1987)

Kuntz had planned to publish a sourcebook on the City of Brass in 1988 (and commissioned cover art and flyers for distribution at game conventions), but it did not see print.
