= Eric N. Shook =

American game designer

Eric Shook
- Occupation: Game designer

Eric Nelson Shook is a game designer.

== Career ==
Eric Shook is a graphic designer and an author. Shook was a longtime friend of Gary Gygax, and began with TSR in the Dungeon Hobby Shop. When Gygax was expanding Greyhawk in the early 1980s, he brought Shook and Rob Kuntz in to help him manage the project. Shook was involved in working on The Forgotten Temple of Tharizdun (1982) with Gygax and Kuntz.

Shook was later the Vice President of Kuntz's Pied Piper Publishing.
