= Don Kaye =

American game designer (1938–1975)

- Born: June 27, 1938
- Died: January 31, 1975 (aged 36)
- Occupation: game publisher
- Writing career
- Genre: role-playing games

Donald R. Kaye (June 27, 1938 – January 31, 1975) was the co-founder of Tactical Studies Rules (TSR), the game publishing company best known for their Dungeons & Dragons (D&D) role-playing game. He and TSR co-founder Gary Gygax had been friends since childhood, sharing an interest in miniature war games. In 1972, Kaye created Murlynd, one of the first D&D characters, and play-tested him in Gygax's Castle Greyhawk campaign. Kaye and Gygax were convinced that D&D and similar games were an excellent business opportunity, and together they founded Tactical Studies Rules in 1973. However, only two years later, just as sales of D&D started to rise, Kaye unexpectedly died of a heart attack at age 36.

== Early life ==
Don Kaye was born on June 27, 1938. He grew up in Lake Geneva, Wisconsin, where at age 8, he became friends with Gygax, who had moved there from Chicago, Illinois. The two young boys also often played with tomboy Mary Jo Powell, but lost touch with her when she moved away. At age fifteen, Kaye and Gygax began playing miniature war games, designing their own miniatures rules for their large collection of 54 mm and 70 mm toy soldiers, using "ladyfinger firecrackers" to simulate explosions.

A rift formed in their friendship when both Kaye and Gygax were interested in the same woman, Mary Jo Powell. She and Gygax got married, and Kaye refused to attend their wedding.

In 1965, Kaye, Gygax, Mike Reese, and Leon Tucker created a military miniatures society, Lake Geneva Tactical Studies Association (LGTSA). Its first headquarters were in Gygax's basement, and they later held meetings in Kaye's garage.

== Formation of TSR ==
In the fall of 1972, Dave Arneson, a wargamer from nearby Minneapolis-St. Paul, demonstrated a new type of role-playing game to the LGTSA. Gygax then created a similar game set in the imaginary Castle Greyhawk, and invited his children, Ernie and Elise, "to create characters and adventure". The next evening, Kaye joined the game along with Gygax's friends Rob Kuntz and Terry Kuntz. Kaye created the character Murlynd, Rob Kuntz created Robilar and Terry Kuntz created Terik. Kaye observed as a group eagerly played the prototype Dungeons & Dragons game at Gen Con VI (1973), and brought the idea to Gygax of starting a company so that they could publish the game on their own.

Sensing the potential popularity of the game, in October 1973 the two men each invested US$1,000 in the venture — Kaye borrowed his share on his life insurance policy — in order to finance the start-up of TSR, which was initially run with business taking place in Kaye's dining room. Their investment of $2,000 was not enough to print their new role-playing game, so they instead published Cavaliers and Roundheads, a miniatures game based on the English Civil War, and planned to use its revenue to print and publish D&D. However sales were poor, and they still did not have enough capital to publish Dungeons & Dragons.

While developing D&D, Gygax had sent copies of his preliminary rules to other wargaming friends for playtesting. Now worried that someone who had playtested the new type of game would bring a similar product to the market first, the two accepted an offer in December 1973 by playing acquaintance Brian Blume to invest $2,000 in TSR to become an equal one-third partner. Gygax accepted Blume's offer right away. Kaye was less enthusiastic, and after a week to consider the offer, he questioned Blume closely before acquiescing. Blume's investment finally brought the financing that enabled them to publish D&D.

In January 1974, they printed a thousand copies of the game and hand-assembled them in the basement of Gygax's house. Warehousing and shipping was done from Kaye's home. The first printing sold out before the end of 1974, and sales of a second printing began to increase exponentially. In late 1974, Kaye helped develop some of the rules for a new Western-genre game to be called Boot Hill.

== Death and legacy ==
Although only 36 years old at the start of 1975, Kaye needed heart surgery, a fact that he did not disclose to his partners. Gygax and Blume were therefore unprepared when Kaye suffered a heart attack before the scheduled date for surgery and died on January 31, 1975.

Kaye had not made any specific provision in his will regarding his one-third share of the company, so his share of TSR passed to his wife, who was not interested in having any part of TSR. Gygax stated "After Don died [Kaye's wife] dumped all the Tactical Studies Rules materials off on my front porch. It would have been impossible to manage a business with her involved as a partner." Neither Gygax nor Blume had the money to formally buy the share owned by Kaye's wife, but Blume persuaded Gygax to allow his father, Melvin Blume, to buy it. The company was re-formed as TSR Hobbies, Inc, with the Blume family owning controlling interest.

In 1975, Gygax and Blume published Boot Hill in memory of Kaye. Gygax highlighted Kaye's character Murlynd in the March 1983 issue of Dragon magazine. Gygax paid further tribute to Kaye when he used Murlynd's name for two spells (Murlynd's Ogre, Murlynd's Void) and an item (Murlynd's Spoon) in Unearthed Arcana.
