= Panzerfaust Magazine =

Wargaming magazine (1967-1982)

- Editor: Don Greenwood
- Categories: Miniature Wargaming
- Frequency: Monthly
- First issue: 1967
- Final issue Number: 1976 (as Panzerfaust); 1982 (as Campaign); 111
- Company: Don Greenwood (1967–1972); Guidon Games (1972–1982)
- Country: United States
- Based in: Fitchburg, Wisconsin

Panzerfaust was a wargaming magazine started by Don Greenwood in 1967 and named after the German panzerfaust, a recoilless anti-tank weapon. Like the more successful Strategy & Tactics magazine, Panzerfaust included complete games.

Originally an informal periodical distributed on ditto sheets, by 1972 the magazine was a staple-bound 5.5" x 8.5" pamphlet with a monochrome cover and an average length of about 50 pages. That year Don Lowry, owner of Guidon Games, acquired the magazine. Lowry stopped including games in the magazine, preferring to sell them separately under the Panzerfaust Publications imprint. In 1976 Lowry renamed the magazine Campaign.

The magazine published articles by notable industry figures such as Jerry Pournelle, Gary Gygax, Lou Zocchi, Mike Carr, Jack Scruby, and Dave Arneson. The magazine also reviewed early Dungeons & Dragons products, starting with the original boxed set (1974) which was reviewed in issue #62.

The last issue of Campaign magazine appeared in 1982.
