= Alexander the Great (board game) =

1971 wargame

- 1st edition, Guidon Games, 1971
- Years active: 1971 – 1972, 1974 –
- Genres: Military tactics, strategy
- Players: 2
- Setup time: 15 minutes
- Playing time: 2 hours
- Chance: low

Alexander the Great is a board wargame first published by Guidon Games in 1971 that simulates the Battle of Arbela in 331 BCE, also known as the Battle of Gaugamela. A revised edition was published by Avalon Hill in 1974. Both editions of the game were notable for having what one critic described as "one of the ugliest maps ever to curse a war game."

== Background ==
Alexander the Great's victory over Darius III of Persia at the Battle of Issus in 333 BCE gave Alexander control of the western half of the Persian Empire. While Darius retreated to Babylon to regroup, Alexander's Macedonian army went on to conquer the Levant and Egypt. In 331 BCE, the Persians and Macedonians met again at the small village of Gaugamela to determine the fate of the Persian Empire.

== Description ==
Alexander the Great is a two-player game in which one player controls the Macedonians and the other controls the forces of Persia.

=== Gameplay ===
The game uses die-cut counters and a hex grid map common to wargames of this era. Pieces represent infantry, cavalry, phalanx formations, various ranged weapons troops, chariots, and elephants.

The movement and combat mechanics use a simple "I Go, You Go" system, where one player moves and attacks, followed by the other player.

A unique feature of the game is a sliding morale track to determine which combat results table is used for combat resolution.

== Publication history ==
Alexander the Great was designed by Gary Gygax in the days before he co-founded TSR, when he was working as a freelance game designer for Guidon Games. The game was published by Guidon in 1971, and was followed in 1972 by the supplement Alexander's Other Battles, which provided additional counters and maps for the battles of Granicus, Issus, and the Hydaspes.

The following year, when Guidon went out of business, Avalon Hill acquired the rights to the game, and Gygax worked with Donald Greenwood to revise a second edition of the game, which was published by Avalon Hill in 1974.

After the new game was released, Gygax and Tom Hazlett designed two supplements to the game, The Battle of Isis and The Battle of the Hydaspes, which were published in Avalon Hill's house magazine, The General.

The Avalon Hill 2nd edition game box (1974) and much-reviled "violent green" mapboard that was described as "the result of an exceptionally nasty LSD trip."

== Reception ==
In the inaugural issue of Phoenix, John Norris said this game has "the best army morale system I have ever seen in a board game, which reduces the effectiveness of troops as it declines in stages." However, Norris noted "Unfortunately the game does not allow one to recreate Alexander's battle plan at all, or the Persian one, for that matter. This is because of a series of flaws in design."

In his 1977 book The Comprehensive Guide to Board Wargaming, Nicholas Palmer made note of "the violent green mapboard, which some find exciting and other off-putting." Although he thought it was "Quite easy to learn," he warned that "Lack of terrain concentrates attention on tactical duels and morale levels." In his 1980 sequel, The Best of Board Wargaming, Palmer added "The first player to give ground will find it quite hard to recover." He concluded by giving the game an "excitement" grade of only 50%, and a rules clarity grade of 70%, saying, "The game was one of the earliest to import miniatures concepts into board wargaming."

In the 1980 book The Complete Book of Wargames, game designer Jon Freeman also noted the map, calling it "a lime-gelatin-and-chocolate-pudding parfait [...] one of the uglier maps around." But he thought, other than the map, that "Alexander the Great is not a bad game [...] the battle doesn't have too much period flavor, but it is a reasonably evenly matched engagement." He concluded by giving the game an overall evaluation of "Good", saying, "it is difficult to re-create a battle such as Arbela on a small-unit, small scale map without washing out most of the interest."

Martin Campion thought that the game was "a fair representation of an ancient battle and has a larger number than usual of intriguing and innovative design features."

In Issue 3 of Perfidious Albion, Charles Vasey, who had just designed a game about the Battle of the Hydaspes, reviewed the Alexander the Great supplement The Battle of the Hydaspes published in The General and disagreed with game designer Gary Gygax's order of battle. After pointing out many errors, Vasey concluded, "All this leads me to believe that this is not a simulation of Hydaspes but a 'rigged' battle."

In a retrospective review in Issue 14 of Simulacrum, David Chancellor commented, "Alexander the Great is commonly recognized as having one of the ugliest maps ever to curse a war game. A hideous blend of green, gold and orange, it looks like the results of an exceptionally nasty LSD trip. Players have been known to skip this game to avoid having to look at the map."

== Other reviews and commentary ==
- Panzerfaust #52, #55 & #59, and 66
- Campaign #88
- Fire & Movement #22
- Phoenix #12
- Strategy & Tactics #214
- Games & Puzzles #52
