= Terry Kuntz =

American game designer

- Born: Theron O. Kuntz; December 25, 1953 (age 72); Fort Atkinson, Wisconsin
- Occupation: Game designer

Theron O. Kuntz (born December 25, 1953, Fort Atkinson, Wisconsin) is a game designer who was an early associate of Gary Gygax and employee of TSR.

== Biography ==
Kuntz was born in Fort Atkinson, Wisconsin on December 25, 1953, and he moved with his family to Lake Geneva, Wisconsin in 1955. Kuntz became involved in miniatures wargaming at age 15 through his brother Rob, who played miniatures and board games at the house of his friend Gary Gygax, where the three of them would play miniatures battles on his sand table. Kuntz was also a member of the Lake Geneva Tactical Studies Association with Gygax and his brother.

In the early 1970s, Terry, Rob, and Gygax's friend Don Kaye joined Gygax's children Ernie and Elise for the second session of Gygax's new game, the Dungeons & Dragons fantasy role-playing game. Don Kaye played Murlynd, Rob Kuntz played Robilar, and Terry Kuntz played Terik. Terry conceived of the monster known as the beholder, and Gygax later detailed the monster so it could be published. Kuntz also created the magic weapon, the Energy-draining Sword.

Kuntz graduated from college in 1974 with a vocational diploma in mechanical drafting and design, but had difficulty finding a job in that field. During 1974, TSR offered Kuntz employment with the company to help design rules, games, and to manage The Dungeon Hobby Shop. Kuntz joined TSR in 1975.

== Early designs ==
- Castle Greyhawk Campaign proto-RPG development
- "Wargaming: A Moral Issue?" for Dragon magazine
- The Maze of Zayene D&D module
- The Empire of Zothar D&D-variant constructed nation
- Twilight of the Gods boardgame
- Treasure Search boardgame (lost)
