= Tricolor (game) =

Tricolor (1975)

Tricolor is a rulebook for wargaming with Napoleonic miniatures. It was written by Rick Crane and published by TSR, Inc. in 1974 with interior artwork by Greg Bell. The rules require a six-sided die.

Tricolor provides rules for a game that can be played more quickly than many other games with miniatures. It allows for the re-creation of many of the important features of Napoleonic war: the interplay of combined arms, skirmishing by light infantry, and the importance of grape and canister shot by horse artillery.

Along with Jeff Perrin, Crane was one of the first wargaming associates of Gary Gygax, who knew Gygax when the future dungeon master worked at Fireman's Insurance Company, and repaired shoes on the side.

Crane began wargaming at age 11. He eventually became a doctor and hedge fund manager.
