= Elastolin =

German trademark

Elastolin was a trademark used by the German company O&M Hausser (O&M Haußer) for the toy soldiers and other types of figures it manufactured from composite material and later from plastic. The Hausser firm was founded in 1904 by Christian Hausser and his sons Otto and Max. The factory was situated in Ludwigsburg near Stuttgart. Production of all figures (and all other toys) was interrupted when the German economy was put on a "total war" footing in 1943. Limited production of composition figures resumed several years after the end of World War II in 1945. Hausser continued to use the brand name Elastolin when it began production of figures in a hard polystyrene plastic in 1955 while production of figures in the older sawdust-based composition material continued into the 1969. Hausser production of plastic figures continued through 1982. The company filed for bankruptcy in June 1983 and ceased production by the end of the year.

== Scales of figures ==
Elastolin composition figures were manufactured in 40mm (also known as 4-cm), 65mm (6.5-cm), 70mm (7-cm), and 105mm (10.5 cm) scales. Since 70-mm is approximately 3-inches, a 70-mm figure is approximately 1/24 scale. The Elastolin catalogs of the 1930s describe the 7-cm figures as being "normal size" (normalgrosse) and the 4-cm figures as Miniatur-Soldaten. The catalog numbers for the 4-cm figures began with the preface M so the catalog number for a 4-cm marching Heer Trommler (Army snare drummer) was M 47/1.

== Heer ==
The Heer, all wearing the correct World War II German uniform, was represented by parade ground figures that included marching officers, marching infantry men, marching flag-carriers, marching musicians, a marching panzer man in his distinctive black uniform, marching Gebirgsjager ("mountain troops"), marching musicians, and cavalry and musicians mounted on horses. The parade ground figures had troops for a guard mounting that included officers standing at attention, enlisted personnel standing at attention or at "present arms", standing flag-carriers, a panzer man saluting, standing musicians, and sentry boxes as well as standing cavalry and standing cavalry musicians.

There was a figure of a drill instructor and three figures of new recruits in fatigue uniform doing training exercises.

Heer combat troops included Infanterie (series 500/- and 600/-) (riflemen, grenade throwers and machine gun teams), Kavallerie (series 400/-), Artillerie [series 664/-] (crewmen for the tinplate artillery pieces), Nachrichtentruppe ("communications troops") [series 659/-] which included World War I-vintage message dog- and carrier-pigeon-wranglers, Pioniere ("combat engineer and construction troops") [series 662/-] and Krad-Schutzen ("motorcycle troops") [series 990/-] on individual two-passenger motorcycles and three-passenger sidecar models.

Poison gas had been used by both sides on the Western Front during World War I, and so there was a Gasalarmschlager ("gas alarm striker") [584] and several Infanterie figures wearing gas masks.

The Verwundete und Sanitatspersonal (series 656) included doctors and nurses to treat the assortment of wounded soldiers that the medic figures brought back from the battlefield. Series 656 also included a Toter Soldat ("dead soldier") [652/15].

Lagerleben ("camp life") [series 550/-] was represented by soldiers washing, cleaning, eating, reclining and their tents. There was also figure 550/36/50, a unit clerk who came ready to work with his own table, bench and typewriter.

== Kriegsmarine ==
The Kriegsmarine was represented by a "personality" figure of Großadmiral Erich Raeder saluting, marching officers carrying swords, sailors carrying rifles, marching fanfare trumpeters (Fanfarenblaser) and flag-carriers (Fahnentrager) and a short set of combat figures. There are two basic sets of marching figures -— one set wears the blue winter uniform and the other wears the white summer uniform. Complete sets of marching musicians were produced for both of the seasonal colors. There are also marching sailors wearing white shirts and blue trousers. The set of Kriegsmarine combat figures includes standing, kneeling and prone riflemen, a charging rifleman, a charging officer, a rifleman swinging his rifle like a club, and a grenade thrower. All Elastolin Kriegsmarine figures of the Nazi era (1933–1945) are cataloged in series 14/-- (The catalog number for a marching Kriegsmarine Trommler [snare drummer] was 14/47/1, with 14 indicating the branch of service; the second number, 47, indicated that the figure was a marching musician, and the final number, 1, indicated that the musician was a Trommler).

== Luftwaffe ==
The Luftwaffe was represented on the parade ground by several different "personality" figures of Reichsmarschall Hermann Göring, and two series of marching figures: Flieger ("fliers") [series 26/-] with yellow waffenfarbe ("arm of service color") and Flak ("anti-aircraft troops) [series 28/-] with red waffenfarbe. Both branches were represented by several types of marching officers, marching enlisted personnel with rifles (some wearing the soft field cap, others wearing the iconic stahlhelm helmet), marching flag-carriers, and complete sets of marching and standing musicians. Fliegers and Flak alike were also represented by standing (non-marching) officers and enlisted men.

The marching Fliegers also included an aircrewman wearing a beige "flight suit" instead of the blue Luftwaffe uniform.

The Luftwaffe also had combat troops. There were 28/664 series Flak-Artillerie crews and 28/590 Flak-Krad-Schutzen figures. These figures were the same as their Heer counterparts but with the distinctive blue-gray uniform of the Luftwaffe. Elastolin solf them sold for the same price as their Heer counterparts, but modern auction catalogs usually list them at higher prices and modern day collectors must therefore take care that any 28/664 and 28/590 figures they buy are not post-war repaints of the regular 664 and 590 figures.

== Paramilitary ==
The paramilitary units include the SA (Sturm Abteilung), the SS, the LSSAH (Leibstandarte Adolf Hitler = Hitler's elite SS bodyguard unit), the RAD (Reichsarbeitsdienst = German Labor Service), NSDAP (the Nazi party), Hitler Youth (Hitler Jugend), Jungvolk (pre-teen counterpart of the Hitler Youth), BdM (female counterpart of the Hitler Youth), Marinesturm (Marine-SA; a specialized sub-unit of the SA), and several others.

All the paramilitary organizations were represented by marching figures. There were complete marching bands of SA, SS and RAD musicians; also a complete band of standing (non-marching) SA musicians that included a kesselpauker (kettle drummer). The Jungfolk were represented by marching drummers, flautists and fanfarenblaser.

There were SA, SS, LSSAH, RAD, Hitler Youth, Jungvolk, BdM and NSFK marching figures carrying either the German national flag or the flag of their individual organization.

The SA had been the largest and most visible of the Nazi paramilitary organizations in the 1920s and on into the 1930s, and so it is not surprising that Elastolin made many types of SA figures. There SA figures in several types of uniforms—the basic "brown shirt," another uniform with a brown jacket, and a winter uniform. The SA marchers included men carrying packs, and men with slung rifles. The parade figures also included an SA medic and an SA nurse—quick "first aid" (at the least) was often important during the Kampfzeit ("time of battle/struggle") before Hitler was appointed chancellor!

There were also figures on horseback, and a small group of mounted SA musicians.

Stepping outside the parade ground, there was an extensive line of SA Lagerleben figures and others representing a unit undergoing field training.

== Personality figures ==
The first "personality figures" Hausser producer were Kaiser Wilhelm II and soon after Feldmarschall von Hindenburg during World War I.

The "personality figures" include Hitler, von Hindenburg, Ludendorff, Göring, Hess, Goebbels, von Schirach, Großadmiral Raeder, and Generalfeldmarschall von Mackensen in Hussar uniform. There are also two personality figures of Mussolini and one of Franco. A personality figure of SA leader Ernst Röhm was dropped from the line after he was executed during the so-called "Night of the Long Knives" (a purge of the socialist wing of the Nazi party) in 1934. The figure of General von Blomberg became a generic General figure after he was forced to retire in 1938.

Hitler was represented by several uniformed figures; one was a walking figure of Hitler reviewing troops or perhaps a Nazi unit with his right arm up in his unique bent-arm salute. There was also a seated Hitler to ride in one of Elastolin's magnificent staff cars (German children knew the Führer always sat up front next to the driver and never in the back seat). There was also an early figure of Hitler in civilian attire.

Göring's high profile in the German leadership was reflected by the fact that he too was represented by figures showing him in SA, NSFK and Luftwaffe uniform. There was a walking figure (26/21) of Goring reviewing troops, and as Goring was promoted to Generalfeldmarschall and then to the unique rank of Reichsmarschall a figure was produced that showed "the Iron Man" holding an appropriately large marschall's baton.

Premium grade figures of Hitler, Göring, Hindenburg, Mussolini and Franco were made with headless composition bodies that were then fitted with special-made porcelain heads that captured their facial features and expressions with exceptional clarity. These command premium prices from collectors.

Mussolini was available as a walking figure (25/21N) and sitting astride a horse (25/496N). While German President Generalfeldmarshall und Reichspresident Paul von Hindenburg was still in the catalog for several years after his death in 1934 and was available in uniform (649), in civilian attire (648), and in uniform astride a horse.

All of the Nazi leaders (Hitler, Röhm, Heß, Göring, Goebbels and von Schirach) were represented by at least one figure with a movable right arm that could be raised and positioned in the German greeting (aka the "Heil Hitler!" salute). The figures of Mussolini and Franco also had arms could also positioned in the Fascist-style salute (In contrast, Wehrmacht figures saluted/"greeted" each other with the traditional right-hand-touching-cap/helmet salute).

== Foreign (Ausländer) forces ==
The foreign (Ausländer) armed services were also well represented. These include British, American, Danish, Dutch, Belgian, Ethiopian, French, Swiss, Italian, Hungarian, Romanian, (British) Indian, Chinese and Japanese.

The French forces include the French Army (marching and combat figures), marching French sailors, marching French colonial forces ("French" and "native"), and a short line of the elite chasseurs alpins (mountain troops). The Belgians were represented by infantry—marching figures and combat figures; there was also a short line of figures wearing the distinctive green beret of the Ardennes Rifle Corps.

The Italians were represented by marching infantry and several combat figures; there were also marching officers and men of the elite bersaglieri rifle units with their broad-brimmed hats and black cockerel feathers. Italian figures in tropical uniforms, and (black) African colonial soldiers were produced in small numbers.

Guards Regiments in colourful dress uniforms were produced of the United Kingdom's Grenadier Guards and Denmark's Royal Life Guards.

Hausser-Elastolin made most of its foreign figures by adding a head with the correct helmet to a headless conventional body and then painting the figure accordingly. That is why English, American and French soldiers are armed with German-style "potato masher" hand grenades rather than the Allied "pineapple" hand grenade, and why they carry a standard German gas mask canister. However, there are also some foreign figures that were made from special castings—those of Belgian and French soldiers wearing long greatcoats being the best example.

Several other European nations took note of the greater protection afforded by the German stahlhelm design and used it for their own forces. This made it possible for Elastolin to create figures representing some foreign armies simply by painting standard German figures with German heads in the color(s) of a foreign uniform. Therefore, it is helpful to have a good reference book such as Andrew Mollo's The Armed Forces of World War II to correctly identify them—particularly when distinguishing between German, Hungarian and Swiss personnel.

== Other Hausser-Elastolin figures from the 1930s ==
The Hausser-Elastolin line of the 1930s was not limited to the military and paramilitary units of the time. There was also an extensive line of cowboys and Indians (the cowboys sometimes known as "trappers" in Germany), a shorter line of medieval knights and foot soldiers (Ritterfiguren), and a short line of Prussian and Austrian figures from the 18th-century wars of Frederick the Great (Friedrich der Grosse) that included personality figures of "der alte Fritz" (0/7/20) and two of his generals—Seydlitz (0/7/21) and Ziethen (0/7/22). The figure of a Prussian drummer with a black (African) face (figure 0/7/47/1M) is correct; there was an African drummer in the Prussian army at that time, however such a figure should be checked carefully with a "black light" to make sure that it is not a post-war repaint.

There was an extensive lines of wild animals (menagerie-und-jagdtiere) and farm animals (haustiere), and also a line of more than 30 civilian figures for use with electric trains (Eisenbahn-Figuren). The latter included DRB (Deutsche Reichsbahn = German Railway) workers, station workers such as luggage carriers, and passengers; they were produced primarily in 7-cm (Normalgroße) although some were also available in 5-cm and 3-cm sizes.

== Accessories ==
Hausser produced log cabin forts for the cowboys, castles/fortresses for the knights, houses and barns for the farmers and their animals, zoo enclosures for the wild animals, and an assortment of trench pieces and bunkers (Schutzengraben aus Holz) that allowed piece-by-piece purchase and assembly of multi-line trench systems for the soldiers. These included artillery emplacements, command bunkers, a field kitchen and a first aid station.

There was an equally extensive line of tin plate military wagons (including a field kitchen and a field bakery), trucks, half-tracks, searchlights and artillery pieces. Some of the 1920s vintage models were rather generic in design, but some of the later models were accurate scale models of their real-life counterparts—the 721-1/2 leichtes Inf.-Geschutz ("light infantry cannon"), 726 schweres Langrohrgeschutz ("heavy long-barreled cannon"), 710 Schwere Feldhaubitze ("heavy field howitzer") and the 744 Panzer-Spahwagen ("armored scout wagen" = armored car) in particular.

Elastolin added play action value to these toys in several ways. Several of the motor vehicles had battery-powered electric motors that propelled them across the tin plate battlefield with functional electric headlights lighting the way; the truck-mounted and stationary search lights were also functional. The Nachrichtentruppe figure series included "radio groups" equipped with batteries that allowed messages to be sent and received in Morse code. Three of the Infanterie riflemen (54/624, 54/626 and 54/628) contained a cap-firing device that—when tripped—would, in theory, send a puff of smoke out the barrel of their (oversize) rifles. Many of the tin plate artillery pieces not only fired caps but projectiles as well—which, in theory were fired only at enemy soldiers and never at family pets or one's younger siblings!

Enterprising young generals with the financial resources to do so could also provide their forces with engineer units using two types of man-powered water craft for crossing water obstacles, and with either a pontoon bridge or a conventional girder bridge so that horses and motor vehicles could cross as well.

== Post-World War II production ==
Limited production of composition figures resumed several years after the end of World War II in 1945 subject to the strict terms of "de-Nazification." Post-war production included the politically inoffensive Swiss figures with their black German-style helmets and black ankle boots, and a new line of American army figures wearing the dark olive uniform and "steel pot" style helmet of the WWII-era US Army.

Figures representing the post-war Bundeswehr and Austrian armies went into production after West Germany and Austria were again allowed to form military forces.

Hausser continued to use the brand name Elastolin when it began production of figures in a hard polystyrene plastic in 1955 (production of figures in the older sawdust-based composition material continued). In the years that followed the company produced Roman soldiers, Huns, Vikings, Normans, Landsknechts and 17th-century Turks. Hausser-Elastolin also manufactured personality figures of Prince Valiant and at least one or two other characters from the popular comic strip and feature film.

Some of the old figure lines -- Medieval figures, "Trappers" (cowboys), American Indians and de-Nazified figures of World War-II era German soldiers—were also manufactured in plastic. Hausser had exclusive rights to produce figures for the works of Karl May, a German author whose tales of the American "Wild West" captured the imaginations of several generations of German boys, and so there are plastic figures representing several of May's best-known characters.

Along with these figures came an impressive new line of catapults, siege towers, a battering ram, camp fences, and early artillery pieces.

Collectors recognize several distinct production series (or types) of these plastic figures. The early lines were sold fully painted as with the older composition figures, a later line was sold unpainted. Plastic figures cannot be correctly identified or appraised in terms of value without reference to the color of the plastic. Beyond that, the rarity (and value) of some figures is also determined by the color of their clothing; some colors are rarer than others.

The 1980 catalog includes Romans, Vikings, Huns, Normans/Medieval figures (including Prince Valiant and Sir Gawain), Landsknechts, Turks, American Indians, cowboys, US cavalry, Karl May characters, Arabs, US War of Independence figures (US regulars and militia, English and German), Prussian soldiers, Union and Confederate soldiers from the American Civil War, contemporary Swiss and Austrian soldiers, de-Nazified World War-II era German soldiers, and two figures representing the Royal Canadian Mounted Police.

The cowboys included two masked outlaws and several men wearing buckskin rather than cloth. The line also included the unfortunate prisoner tied to a tree.

In addition to all the fighting men where were also some civilians—a blacksmith and several helpers with a forge and well from the Middle Ages, and a few Caucasian women and children from the American "Wild West" as the counterparts for the American Indian women and children. Each of the Revolutionary War forces could call on the services of a woman holding a cup in one hand a larger container in the other—presumably both held water.

Historical personality figures in 1980 included Götz von Berlichingen, Georg von Frundsberg and Friedrich der Große. One of the several Revolutionary War figures was certainly intended to be George Washington, but the catalog did not identify him as such.

Wheeled vehicles included a four-horse Roman chariot, a Kampfwagen (battle wagen) of the European late-Middle Ages, an American stage coach drawn by two horses, and an American covered wagen (also drawn by two horses)

== Demise ==
Hausser stopped manufacturing figures from composite materials in 1969. Production of plastic figures continued through 1982. The company filed for bankruptcy in June 1983 and ceased production by the end of the year.

Many of the Hausser moulds were purchased by the Preiser company and are currently being reproduced in plastic.
