= Lake Geneva Tactical Studies Association =

Wargaming club active in Lake Geneva, Wisconsin, US

The Lake Geneva Tactical Studies Association (LGTSA) was a wargaming club active in Lake Geneva, Wisconsin, during the early 1970s.

== History ==
At its inception around February and March 1970, it was originally known as the Lake Geneva Tactical Games Association, though this name gave way to 'LGTSA' within weeks. Its early membership included Gary Gygax, Terry and Rob Kuntz, Ernie Gygax, Jeff Perren, Mike Reese, Leon Tucker, and Don Kaye. The group usually met weekly in Gygax's basement. Brian Blume joined the LGTSA in the summer of 1973. When Gygax and Kaye founded Tactical Studies Rules (later TSR, Inc.) in 1973 to publish Dungeons & Dragons, they echoed part of the name of the LGTSA in the name of their new company; Blume later soon joined the partnership. The LGTSA continued to exist as a wargaming group well after the publication of Dungeons & Dragons.
