= International Federation of Wargaming =

Former wargaming club

The International Federation of Wargaming (IFW) was a wargaming club operated from 1967 to about 1973.

== Formation ==
Founded by Bill Speer, Gary Gygax, and Scott Duncan in 1967, it emerged as a successor to an earlier club called the United States Continental Army Command, founded by Speer. It was founded as a society of gamers with a strong interest specifically in board wargaming and also in the promotion of the publication of wargames. The IFW distinguished itself as a more mature club than its rivals in the early American wargaming hobby.

Its membership included gamers in local wargaming clubs such as the Lake Geneva Tactical Studies Association and the Midwest Military Simulation Association. IFW members participated in various "societies" within the IFW for special interests, such as the Castle & Crusade Society, which promoted medieval wargaming, and the Armored Operations Society, which emphasized World War II wargaming.

The IFW ceased functioning around 1973.

== Conventions and fanzines ==
The IFW held its first annual convention in Malvern, Pennsylvania in July 1967, though it was only a year later when Gary Gygax hosted the annual convention on behalf of the IFW in his home town of Lake Geneva, Wisconsin, that the Lake Geneva Wargames Convention (Gen Con) was born.

By publishing a magazine (called The Spartan in 1968 and later called International Wargamer) and sponsoring the early Gen Cons, the IFW helped wargamers share ideas and meet wargamers from different parts of the country.
