= Robert J. Kuntz =

Game designer

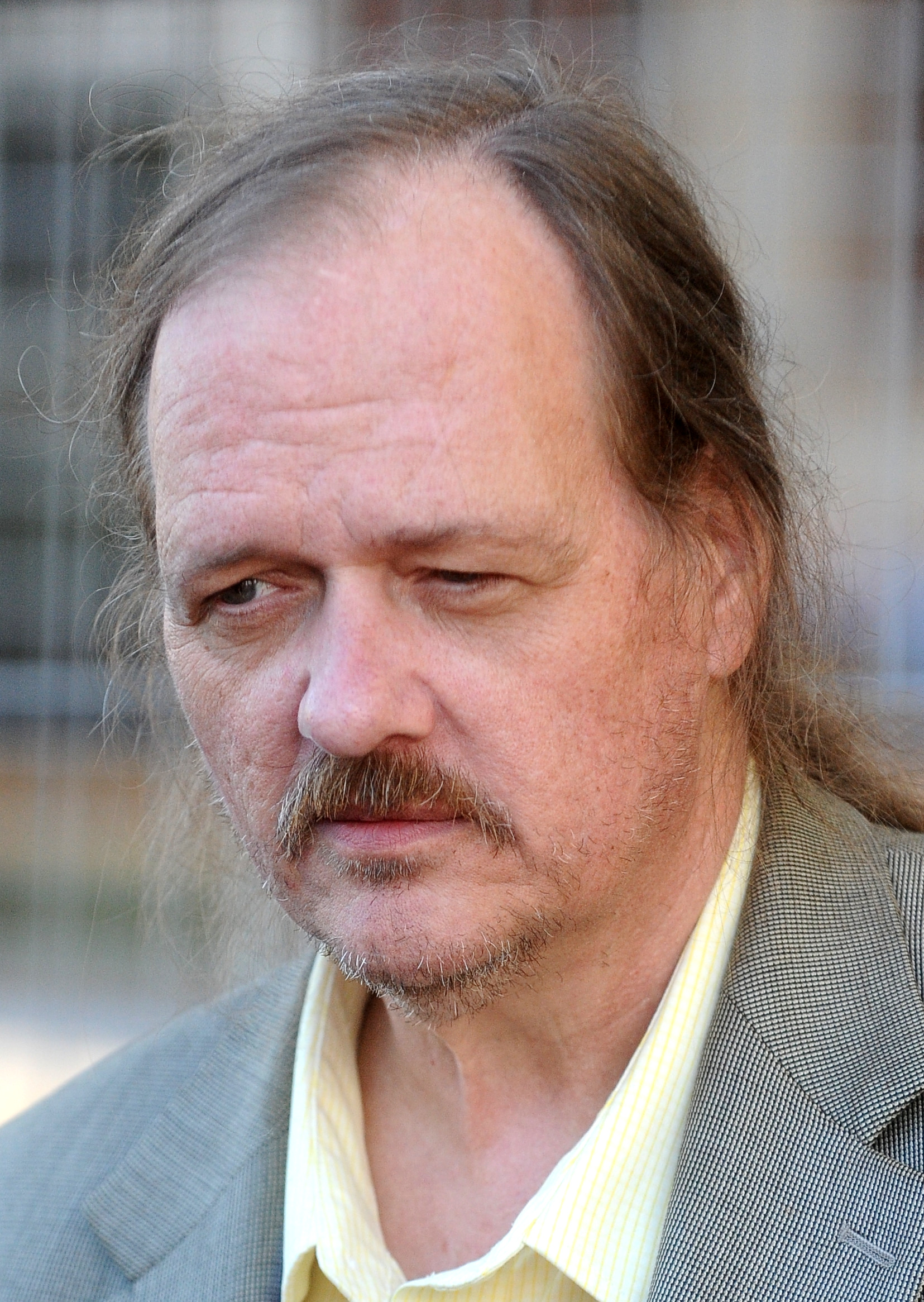
- Robert J. Kuntz at Lucca Comics & Games 2015
- Born: September 23, 1955 (age 70); Wisconsin, United States
- Occupations: Author, game designer
- Writing career
- Period: 1973–present
- Genre: Role-playing games
- Website: threelinestudio.com

Robert J. Kuntz (born September 23, 1955) is a game designer and author of role-playing game publications. He is best known for his contributions to various Dungeons & Dragons-related materials.

== Biography ==
=== Early life ===
Kuntz was born September 23, 1955, in Lake Geneva, Wisconsin. His older brother is Terry Kuntz. Kuntz learned about miniature wargames at age 13 while skimming through an issue of Playboy; he saw a game called Dogfight listed in a section describing party gifts for Christmas. Kuntz began playing boardgames, miniatures and play-by-mail games. Kuntz met Gary Gygax in 1968.

In November 1972, Dave Arneson and Dave Megarry traveled to Lake Geneva to meet with Gary Gygax, to provide a demonstration of Blackmoor and Dungeon! While meeting at Gygax's house, Dave Arneson ran the Lake Geneva gamers through their first session of Blackmoor. Rob Kuntz describes Dave Arneson as the referee, and the Lake Geneva players as being Gary Gygax, Ernie Gygax, Terry Kuntz, and himself. Kuntz describes Dave Megarry as the de facto leader of the group, as he understood the Blackmoor game and campaign world. In Wargaming magazine, Rob Kuntz wrote a short summary of their first Blackmoor session:

Gary, myself and a few other local wargamers were the first "lucky" fellows from Lake Geneva to experience the rigors of Blackmoor. This idea caught on deeply with Gary after an exciting adventure in which our party of heroes fought a troll, were fireballed by a magic-user, then fled to the outdoors (being chased by the Magic-user and his minions), fought four (gulp!) Balrogs, followed a map to sixteen ogres and destroyed them with a wish from a sword we had procured from the hapless troll earlier.

In 1972, at age 17 Kuntz only lived a few blocks away from Gygax, and got the chance to play in the second-ever game session of Dungeons & Dragons that was set in the World of Greyhawk, where his player character was a fighter named Robilar. Kuntz began running his own "Castle El Raja Key" campaign for Gygax in 1973. His campaign world was known as Kalibruhn. By 1974, the group of D&D players in the Greyhawk game sometimes hosted over 20 people, so Kuntz became the co-dungeon-master, so that each dungeon master could focus on smaller groups with a dozen players. Kuntz pulled in some elements of his own campaign into Greyhawk, and some levels of El Raja Key become merged into Castle Greyhawk.

=== TSR ===
Gygax formed TSR in 1973 and was hired as the first full-time employee for the company in mid-1975, and soon after Rob Kuntz, Terry Kuntz, Tim Kask, and Dave Megarry also became employees. Kuntz was the sixth employee of TSR and was initially hired to work in shipping, but because of the small size of the company, everyone got a chance to do some design work, allowing Kuntz to co-author the Greyhawk supplement (1975). Kuntz also co-authored Gods, Demi-Gods & Heroes (1976) with James M. Ward. That same year Kuntz, along with Gygax and Brad Stock, redeveloped the Lankhmar wargame for publication by TSR, from the original design by Fritz Leiber and Harry Fischer. His short fiction story "The Quest for the Vermillion Volume" appeared in The Strategic Review Vol. II #1 (February, 1976), and was the first work of fiction that TSR published. Gygax credits Kuntz with "substantial ideas" in Expedition to the Barrier Peaks (1980), which was originally run as an adventure at Origins II in 1976. Kuntz served in the company in many positions, as designer, editor, Director of Shipping, columnist for the Dragon Magazine, Convention Chairman (Gen Con VIII & IX and Winter Fantasy 1) and oversaw the AD&D line's licensing to Judges Guild for a short time period.

As a D&D player, Kuntz developed the character of Robilar, the first character to successfully complete Tomb of Horrors, among other exploits. Because of Kuntz' imaginative play of this character, Gary Gygax awarded him co-Dungeon Master status for Gygax's original Greyhawk home campaign.

As Gygax's friend and co-DM, Kuntz influenced the development of the Greyhawk milieu. For example, Gygax adapted Kuntz' dark god "Tharzduun" into the entity known today as Tharizdun. The names of the characters Tzunk and Bilarro are anagrams for his or his character's names.

Kuntz authored or co-authored several D&D publications, including the first edition of Deities & Demigods.

== Post-TSR and return to TSR ==
Despite having a hand in many aspects of the company, Kuntz's official job was still in the shipping department. He wanted to move entirely to game design and write a supplement based on his world of Kalibruhn, but when the company would not let him get more involved in creative works, Kuntz left TSR in 1977.

Kuntz enrolled at University of Wisconsin–Whitewater with a major in English and creative writing and a minor in Communications. He married and continued to design his own game material.

Gygax was expanding Greyhawk in the early 1980s, and brought Kuntz back to TSR as well as Eric Shook to help him manage this creative work. Kuntz designed a two-part tournament adventure based on one that he ran while in college, called "The Maze of Xaene", set in Great Kingdom of the Greyhawk world and featuring its king Ivid V; James Ward ran this adventure in the D&D tournament at EastCon in 1982, but TSR never published the adventure.

Kuntz and Tom Wham designed the board game "King of the Tabletop" which appeared in Dragon #77 (September 1983). Kuntz wrote WG5: Mordenkainen's Fantastic Adventure (1984), based on his early role-playing adventures. Kuntz continued to play and participate as a judge for Gygax in the Greyhawk campaign until Gygax closed it down in 1985 when he left TSR.

=== Creations Unlimited and New Infinities ===
Kuntz left TSR in 1985 when Gygax was forced out, and was very protective of his intellectual property, never having signed over the rights to Kalibruhn to anyone. The following year, Kuntz created his own company, Creations Unlimited with the tagline "The New Wave in FRP Games" to hold and protect the rights to his game world and other creations. Kuntz also said this was his way "to get in touch with players and give them a voice."

The company published The Maze of Zayene, a set of four linked adventures: Part 1: Prisoners of the Maze (1987), Part 2: Dimensions of Flight (1987), Part 3: Tower Chaos (1987) and Part 4: The Eight Kings (1987); Kuntz had created the first two adventures while he was in college, and had subsequently run them at EastCon in 1983. The company's fifth and final publication was Garden of the Plantmaster (1987); Kuntz had other publications planned, the first of which was to be RPGA tournament adventure "(To the) City of Brass", followed by "Hidden Realms of Zayene", but Creations Unlimited never released any of these.

Kuntz contributed two adventures to the TSR adventure collection Fate of Istus (1989), one of which included a lich named "Xaene the Accursed".

By 1988, Gygax's new company New Infinities Productions was planning to start the "Fantasy Master" line to present a version of the Castle and City of Greyhawk that Gygax and Kuntz had originally envisioned; Kuntz would have contributed to what was going to have been known as "Castle Dunfalcon". However, the New Infinities investors forced the company into bankruptcy, and none of this work went into print.

=== Later RPG projects ===
Necromancer Games announced a partnership with Rob Kuntz on May 16, 2001, after obtaining a license to revise his Creations Unlimited adventures for the d20 System. Necromancer Games reprinted the first three Maze adventures in 2001. He also wanted to work on completing his City of Brass for publication, but due to delays on their publication of the "Maze of Zayene" series, Kuntz ended his relationship with Necromancer. Different Worlds Publications published The Eight Kings (2004) by Kuntz, the final adventure in series of four adventures that Necromancer had not finished publishing.

Troll Lord Games announced on November 2, 2001, that they would publish books written by Kuntz. Troll Lord published the adventure Dark Druids (2002) by Kuntz, which he originally wrote in 1976 and set in the Gnarley Forest of Greyhawk. This was intended to be followed a Myths & Legends series starting with "Codex Germania," but Kuntz realized he was too busy with other work and could not complete this first myth book so he withdrew from working with Troll Lord. Kenzer & Company reprinted his adventure Garden of the Plant Master (2003) and later published CZA1: Dark Chateau (2005), which Kuntz had designed as part of Castle Zagyg. He began working on his City of Brass with Kenzer, but his leg was shattered before he was able to finish the adventure, and Kenzer found another author to finish up the book and they published it as Sir Robilar's City of Brass (2003) for HackMaster.

Kuntz wrote a series of adventures for Maure Castle, published in Dungeon Magazine:

- Maure Castle: "The Statuary", DUNGEON #112, with Gary Gygax July 2004
- Return to Maure Castle: "Chambers of Antiquities", DUNGEON #124, July 2005
- Return to Maure Castle: "The Greater Halls", DUNGEON #139, October 2006

The version of Maure Castle that he created for these magazines was an original work, rather than using El Raja Key, to allow Kuntz to protect his IP.

In 2006 he started a new company, Pied Piper Publishing, to maintain control of his IP. The company would publish his latest roleplaying adventure modules which were released on a limited-edition basis:

- CZ1: Cairn of the Skeleton King (2006), the debut product from the company, an original adventure for AD&D. The adventure features artwork by Jim Holloway, former TSR, Inc. artist.
- Tower of Blood (2007), co-authored with Lance Hawvermale

Kuntz started to republish his early campaign materials, such as dungeon levels that had either been designed for Castle Greyhawk or Castle El Raja Key, such as RJK1: Bottle City (2007) and The Original Living Room (2007), both parts from the Castle Greyhawk shared by Gygax and Kuntz.

The following have since been published, including material from the original Lake Geneva Castle & Campaign:

- The Original Living Room (2008)
- The Original Bottle City (2008)
- El Raja Key's Arcane Treasury with Eric N. Shook (2009)
- Daemonic & Arcane (2009)
- The Stalk (2009)
- Dungeon Set #1 - Levels 1-6 with Ramsey Dow (2009)
- Dungeon Set #2 - Levels 7-12 with Ramsey Dow (2009)
- Black Festival (fiction novella, 2010)

Kuntz closed Pied Piper Publishing in 2010. Kuntz signed a contract with Black Blade Publishing to pick back up where he left off working on the "Lake Geneva Castle and Campaign dungeon levels". He also began to work with Chaotic Henchmen Productions.

== Awards ==
- 1986, Charles S. Roberts Award, Kings & Things board game (West End Games)
- 2005, Golden ENnie for Best Adventure, Maure Castle in Dungeon Magazine #112 (Paizo Publishing)
