= Jean Wells =

American artist, game designer and editor

- Born: Oeva Jean Wells; July 25, 1955; Jacksonville, Florida, US
- Died: January 25, 2012 (aged 56)

Oeva Jean Wells Koebernick (July 25, 1955 – January 25, 2012) was an American writer, artist, and editor in the field of role-playing games. She was the first female game designer to be hired by TSR, Inc. Her career at TSR stalled after she wrote a controversial Dungeons & Dragons adventure module that was withdrawn on the eve of publication and subsequently rewritten.

== Early life ==
Jean Wells was born on July 25, 1955, in Jacksonville, Florida, to Walton and Ellen Loft Wells. During a college canoe camping trip, she participated in an impromptu session of Dungeons & Dragons. She was fascinated by the game, and once back on campus, she quickly ordered her own set of the rules, and joined a local group called the "D&D Gang of Statesmen Complex". After several gaming sessions, she realized that she liked the role of dungeon master more than player. In her words, "It gave me an opportunity to use my creativity in an area I already liked, Medieval History and Fantasy."

== Career at TSR ==
Wells also ordered a subscription of The Dragon from TSR Hobbies, and in the July 1978 issue, she noticed an ad for "an alert and talented person [with] design and editorial talent and a good general knowledge of games" in TSR's design department. Although she was still at college studying to be an elementary school art teacher, and her only gaming experience was the D&D she had just started playing, she applied for the position. After some back-and-forth correspondence with Gary Gygax during the fall of 1978, she flew to TSR headquarters in Lake Geneva, Wisconsin, in January 1979 for a three-day visit. Despite her lack of experience, Gygax hired her as the first female in the design department. Wells later recalled that, "he knew I didn't know how to really write rules... He was hiring my imagination and would teach me the rest."

However, Wells had arrived just as TSR was, in her words, "exploding", and Gygax did not have time to introduce her to the world of game design. As a result, and especially because she was the only woman in the design department, Wells felt out of place. She later described herself as "the token female".

She moved into a nearby house nicknamed the "TSR Dorm", since all the renters were TSR staffers—she actually took over the bedroom of Larry Elmore, who had just left TSR—and she started to date Skip Williams.

Her first work was editing the adventure module S2 White Plume Mountain by Lawrence Schick. In addition, she also contributed interior art for the adventure module Lost Tamaochan, as well as artwork to the fourth printing of the original Monster Manual, including drawings of an eye of the deep, a giant Sumatran rat, and violet fungi.

She was the inaugural author of "Sage Advice", a D&D advice column that first appeared in The Dragon starting with issue #31 in November 1979. She tried to bring some humor to the column, believing that some of her young readers were taking D&D too seriously. One such example appeared in her first column, when she was asked how much damage a bow did in Advanced Dungeons & Dragons. Her answer was, "None. Bows do not do damage, arrows do. However, if you hit someone with a bow, I’d say it would probably do 1-4 points of damage and thereafter render the bow completely useless for firing arrows." She continued to handle the "Sage Advice" column until issue #39 (July 1980).

In 1980, she did the design and layout of Brian Blume's The Rogues Gallery (which included her own D&D character Ceatitle). She was also the editor of Gary Gygax's module B2 Keep on the Borderlands, her bestselling piece of design work, since it was included in later printings of the Dungeons & Dragons Basic Set, which sold over one million copies.

=== Palace of the Silver Princess ===
After the success of B2 Keep on the Borderlands, Wells was assigned to write an adventure for the "B" (Basic) series that would teach new players how to play D&D. She consulted her editor, Ed Sollers, about every detail, and the result was B3 Palace of the Silver Princess. In keeping with the design of the first D&D module of the "B" series, B1 In Search of the Unknown by Mike Carr, Wells left several rooms and areas of the module incomplete so that players could customize those areas themselves. As she related, "I was trying to show the players that there was more to a 'dungeon' than just the building. I didn't complete the palace, trying to show them this map could be a mini base map for their game. The players could discover the part of the dungeon that had been caved in wasn't any longer and the DM could expand it. I was assuming that they were trying to learn to set up their own world and I was trying to help."

During the editorial process, Wells wanted to replace artwork by Erol Otus that had transformed her "ubues"—new three-headed monsters—into hermaphrodites whose heads were caricatures of TSR staffers and management. However, she was told that the artwork couldn't be replaced without causing unreasonable printing delays.

On the day when the cartons of printed modules arrived at TSR headquarters ready for shipping and copies were distributed to staff, someone in TSR's upper management strongly objected to the module. Some sources state that the objectionable content was four pieces of artwork by Erol Otus and Laura Roslof that were too overtly sexual while Frank Mentzer later stated that it was specifically the Otus illustration with the caricatures of TSR executives.

Wells herself related that another member of the design department complained to Kevin Blume, and that subsequently she and her editor, Ed Sollers, were called into Kevin Blume's office and asked to explain why a module designed for a younger audience contained S&M.

The end result was that the entire print run of what became known as the "orange version"—because of its orange cover design—was destroyed, except for a few copies that were saved from the trash pile by TSR employees.

The entire module was subsequently rewritten by Tom Moldvay, who changed the plot, replaced all of Wells' new monsters with standard monsters from the D&D Basic Set, and removed the empty areas. In addition, the four contentious pieces of artwork, as well as many others, were replaced. The new version was then released with a green cover.

Following the Silver Princess incident, Wells wanted to write another module, but in her words, "nobody would touch my game ideas with a ten-foot pole." When she realized her suggestions for new adventures and games were being ignored and she was only being given secretarial tasks instead of new design work, she left TSR.

== Life after TSR ==
Wells married another TSR employee, Corey Koebernick, in 1981. When he was laid off by TSR a few months later, they moved to Beloit, Wisconsin, where she would spend the rest of her life. She did not work again, staying at home to raise their two sons.

Wells struggled with several serious illnesses for the last thirty years of her life, including hepatitis C.

On January 24, 2012, Wells was admitted to hospital, and died early the next morning.

== Legacy ==
The piece of work Wells was best known for, the orange version of Palace of the Silver Princess, is an extremely rare item, since most copies were destroyed before its release. One copy rated in VF/SW condition was sold at auction in March 2008 for $3050, making it the highest price paid for a single non-unique D&D module.
