= In Search of Adventure =

Dungeons & Dragons adventure module

- Code: B1–9
- TSR product code: 9190
- Rules required: Dungeons & Dragons
- Character levels: 1–3
- Campaign setting: Mystara
- First published: 1987

Linked modules
- B1, B2, B3, B4, B5, B6, B7, B8, B9, B1–9, B10, B11, B12, BSOLO

In Search of Adventure is an abridged compilation adventure module published by TSR, Inc. in 1987, for the Basic Set of the Dungeons & Dragons (D&D) fantasy role-playing game. Its product designation was TSR 9190. This 160-page book features cover artwork by Keith Parkinson.

== Contents and plot summary ==
In Search of Adventure is a collection of parts of the first nine B-series D&D Basic Set modules, with a frame provided to fit the adventures into the Grand Duchy of Karameikos, the first country treated in the D&D Gazetteer game supplement series. The modules B1–B9 include: B1 In Search of the Unknown, B2 The Keep on the Borderlands, B3 Palace of the Silver Princess, B4 The Lost City, B5 Horror on the Hill, B6 The Veiled Society, B7 Rahasia, B8 Journey to the Rock, and B9 Castle Caldwell and Beyond.

The adventures in In Search of Adventure can be strung together in one of three new overarching plots using an adventure flow chart, depending on where the players head off from their starting point in the town of Threshold.

While most of the adventures in this compilation are complete, many of them were modified to fit as part of a full adventure campaign set in the Grand Duchy of Karameikos on the world of Mystara. Other major modifications include:

Module	Major changes
B1	According to Lawrence Schick there is nothing from B1 In Search of the Unknown in the book. However, on page 23 in the Interlude B section there is a reference to the Caverns of Quasqueton, the name of the dungeon in B1. The maps are on page 150, that the dungeon master may wish to populate and use. The adventure flow chart then lists the Caverns of Quasqueton as an optional adventure.
B2	The cave complex from The Keep on the Borderlands, known as the "Cave of Chaos", is included as an optional adventure in the second path of the adventure flow chart. The keep itself is omitted.
B3	The second version of Palace of the Silver Princess is used. The only major change is a new introduction: the player characters are first visited by the immortal Thendara, who then transports them to the palace, now in the Valley of Haven.
B4	Only the upper five tiers of the pyramid are included while most of the expansionary parts of The Lost City are missing. The dungeon master is however still invited to continue the adventure to the underground city.
B5	The Horror on the Hill is called "The Hobgoblin King" in the book. The adventure's nineteen encounters on the surface of the hill, before the player characters reach the ruined monastery at the top, are excluded.
B6	The book does not include the cutout buildings and character pieces that originally came with The Veiled Society. The revised map of the City of Specularum from the D&D Gazetteer series is also used instead.
B7	No major changes to Rahasia.
B8	Only the direct route in the Journey to the Rock is included; the two other possible paths to the Rock are excluded.
B9	Four of the five short adventures from Castle Caldwell and Beyond are included. The adventures "The Clearing of Castle Caldwell", "Dungeons of Terror", and "The Great Escape" form parts of the first path of the adventure flow chart, while "The Sanctuary of Elwyn the Ardent" is the first adventure in the second path. "The Abduction of Princess Sylvia" is not included.

== Publication history ==
In Search of Adventure was edited by Jeff Grubb and Jon Pickens, and was published by TSR in 1987 as a 160-page book. The module's cover art is by Keith Parkinson. The module compilation includes design work from Mike Carr, Gary Gygax, Tom Moldvay, Douglas Niles, David Cook, Tracy Hickman, Laura Hickman, Michael Malone, and Harry W. Nuckols.

== Reception ==
Ken Rolston briefly reviewed B1–9 In Search of Adventure for Dragon magazine No. 128, commenting that it collects the "choice bits" from the previous modules. He noted the "good, old-fashioned dungeons by world-class designers like Gary Gygax, Doug Niles, and Tom Moldvay". Rolston also described two of the compilation's "exceptionally fine adventures": Rahasia, which he called "a classic low-level FRPG scenario by Tracy Hickman of Dragonlance saga and Ravenloft fame", and David "Zeb" Cook's The Veiled Society, which he called "a rare example of a political and diplomatic adventure in an urban setting for low-level D&D game characters". Rolston concluded the review by saying, "Aside from the intrinsic value of these adventures, they are perfect for introducing new players to FRPGs through the simple, well-presented D&D Basic game system."

Lawrence Schick, in his 1991 book Heroic Worlds, stated that In Search of Adventure compiles the best parts of the B-series of modules, and is "Quite a good deal".

== See also ==
- List of Dungeons & Dragons modules
