= Scourge of the Slave Lords =

Dungeons & Dragons adventure module

- The cover of the Scourge of the Slave Lords compilation module, with art by Jeff Easley. The artwork depicts a slave master battling a group of slaves.
- Code: A1–4
- TSR product code: 9167
- Rules required: 1st Ed AD&D
- Character levels: 4-7 (original modules); 7-11 (combined module)
- Campaign setting: Greyhawk
- Authors: David Cook, Allen Hammack, Harold Johnson, Tom Moldvay, Lawrence Schick, Edward Carmien
- First published: 1980 / 1981; 1986 compilation

Linked modules
- T1–4 A1–4 GDQ1–7; Slavers

Scourge of the Slave Lords (A1–4) is an adventure module for the Dungeons & Dragons fantasy role-playing game, published by TSR, Inc. in 1986. It combines the contents of four earlier modules, all set in the World of Greyhawk campaign setting and intended for use with Advanced Dungeons & Dragons first edition rules.

Scourge of the Slave Lords was ranked the 20th greatest Dungeons & Dragons adventure of all time by Dungeon magazine in 2004.

== Overview ==
The original series consisted of four adventure modules:

- A1 Slave Pits of the Undercity
- A2 Secret of the Slavers Stockade
- A3 Assault on the Aerie of the Slave Lords
- A4 In the Dungeons of the Slave Lords

Each module is a self-contained scenario that leads into the next adventure in the series. The series is designed to be used in the World of Greyhawk, but can be imported to any campaign setting. The modules are set in the Pomarj. According to From the Ashes, this adventure took place in Highport and Drachensgrabs.

== Component modules ==
=== A1 Slave Pits of the Undercity ===
Slave Pits of the Undercity was published by TSR in 1980 as a 24-page booklet, and was written by David Cook. The cover artwork by Jeff Dee features an illustration of two aspis fighting a party of adventurers (including a bearded female dwarf). The interior art was done by Dee, David S. LaForce, Jim Roslof, and Bill Willingham.

As the first module in the series, Slave Pits of the Undercity was the first TSR publication to introduce players in the Greyhawk setting to the Slave Lords and their operations in the central and southwestern Flanaess. The module has been described as the first adventure in a series of medium-level scenarios that provide the player characters with the goal of finding down raiders who have been attacking coastal areas.

==== Synopsis ====
The events of the adventure are set in 580 CY, following four years of raids by slavers on the coastal population along the Sea of Gearnat from Onnwal to the Wild Coast. Local lords, finally tired of the situation, hire a band of adventurers to attack the slavers in their home. The adventure begins in the Pomarj city of Highport at a ruined temple which serves as a headquarters for the slavers. The module takes the group through the temple and into the sewers below where giant insect-like creatures make their lair along with the slave lords.

As the player characters progress against the activities of the band of slavers, they will battle orcs and the giants insects living in the sewers beneath the city that the slavers conquered. Eventually the group reaches the prisoners and their captors, and finds a map showing the route of the caravans. Following this map leads the group to the second module, Secret of the Slavers Stockade.

=== A2 Secret of the Slavers Stockade ===
Secrets of the Slavers Stockade was published by TSR in 1981 as a 32-page booklet with an outer folder, and was written by Harold Johnson and Tom Moldvay. The cover artwork by Jim Roslof features a drawing of two hobgoblins, one of which is a sergeant with a leashed boggle, and a party of adventurers. The interior art was done by Roslof, Dee, Willingham, and Erol Otus. The scenario involves a lost fortress where slaves are held prisoner to fatten them up.

==== Synopsis ====
The previous adventure ends with the capture of a map to a fortress citadel in the hills, used by the slavers as a waypoint on their route. The A2 module gives the Dungeon Master the option to run an overland adventure of 110 miles (177 kilometers) through the Drachensgrab Hills to reach the fort shown on the map, or simply start the adventure with the party overlooking the fort itself. The object of the module is to enter the fort through stealthy means and slowly eliminate the slavers before a general alarm can be raised.

Eventually the group of adventurers makes their way through the fort, avoiding hobgoblin patrols, and reaches a dungeon area. After exploring the dungeons, the players eventually learn that this fort is not the headquarters of the Slave Lords. In fact, the real stronghold of the Slave Lords is located somewhere in the Drachensgrab Hills. This revelation leads the adventurers to the third installment in the series.

=== A3 Assault on the Aerie of the Slave Lords ===
Assault on the Aerie of the Slave Lords was published by TSR in 1981 as a 32-page booklet with an outer folder, and was written by Allen Hammack. The cover artwork by Jeff Dee features a drawing of five of the nine Slave Lords. These five are Nerelas the assassin, Mordrammo the priest, Feetla the master buccaneer, Ajakstu the magic-user, and Brother Milerjoi the monk. The interior art was done by Dee, LaForce, Otus, Roslof, and Willingham. In this scenario the characters continue to search for the slavers in the depths underneath the Drachensgrab Mountains.

==== Synopsis ====
The first part of the module consists of a dangerous labyrinth. This portion of the adventure is meant to be finished within three hours, in tournament mode. It is a trap-filled, monster-heavy section used to lure the group into a secret tunnel leading to the hidden city of Suderham.

In the second part of the adventure, the group discovers the haven of the Slave Lords, a town on an island in a volcanic crater. This new setting, the city of Suderham, offers the players an opportunity to test their roleplaying skills rather than primarily focusing on combat or stealth.

The module provides a number of non-player characters in the city with whom the players can interact and exchange information. To complete the module, the group must find one of several secret entrances to the catacombs beneath the city where the final part of the adventure plays out.

The third section of the adventure moves at a rapid pace in tournament mode, and each room encountered in the level is filled with dangerous creatures. In the final room of the section, the players are captured as a set-up for In the Dungeons of the Slave Lords. If this section is played outside of a tournament, however, it is possible for the players to defeat the slavers and exit the area victorious.

=== A4 In the Dungeons of the Slave Lords ===
In the Dungeons of the Slave Lords, the final module in the series, was published by TSR in 1981 as a 32-page booklet with an outer folder, and was written by Lawrence Schick. The cover artwork by Erol Otus features a drawing of a group of myconid (fungus men) fighting a party of adventurers. The interior art was done by Otus, Roslof, Willingham, Steve Sullivan, David C. Sutherland III, and Jean Wells.

==== Synopsis ====
The A3 module finishes with the player characters as captives of the Slave Lords, and they begin module A4 in the same condition. The module begins with the party trapped, without any gear, deep underground below a volcanic island. The Slave Lords have captured the characters, and have left them for dead in this dark cave system as an erupting volcano threatens to destroy the island. Through a series of incidents they quickly find themselves free but completely bereft of equipment and spells.

The final scenario plays out as a massive earthquake threatens to bring down the tunnels around the group, and they must exit the caverns within four hours or perish in the ensuing collapse. The labyrinth is a difficult test for characters without equipment and spells, and challenges the players' wits and role-playing ability rather than focusing on traditional combat.

Once the players emerge from the caverns, they face the final test of escaping the island itself, which can be accomplished by attacking the surviving Slave Lords, escaping via a different boat, or possibly by swimming.

== Pre-generated characters ==
Because the original modules were run as a tournament event, the compilation includes nine pre-generated characters for use in tournament mode. They are Elwita (dwarf fighter), Ogre (human fighter), Freda (human ranger), Karraway (human cleric), Blodgett (halfling thief), Dread Delgath (human magic-user), Phanstern (human illusionist), Eljayess (half-elf cleric/fighter), and Kayen Telva (elf fighter/magic-user). Each of these characters has a standard list of equipment and prepared spells so that tournament players can begin the game with very little preparation.

== Scoring ==
Due to their design for use at Gen Con XIII, each A series module includes a scoring scheme. This scheme essentially takes the number of surviving characters and gives them points for visiting the largest number of areas described in the adventure. Each area contains additional points available for gain or loss based on specific actions by the players.

== Publication history ==
The A series of modules was created for tournament use at Gen Con XIII in 1980, as the AD&D Open Tournament. The first two modules, and the first part of the third module served as the first round of the tournament, while the second part of the third module was the semifinal and the fourth module was the final round. The modules were then expanded and published for campaign play; the original locations used in the tournament are clearly marked on the maps and in the related text, and the modules include a scoring system for those interested in recreating the competition. Slave Pits of the Undercity, for example, contains both characters that had been tested in tournament play and a tournament scoring system. The first module was published in 1980, and the other three were published in 1981.

The omnibus A1–4 supermodule was published in 1986 as a 128-page book with a sixteen-page map booklet and a cover by Jeff Easley, and was slightly revised for play by higher level characters in order for it to be used as a continuation adventure for campaigns beginning with supermodule T1–4 The Temple of Elemental Evil. The overall campaign could then be continued into the GDQ1–7 supermodule Queen of the Spiders. Design contributors to the revision (including the original module designers) were David Cook, Allen Hammack, Harold Johnson, Tom Moldvay, Lawrence Schick, and Edward Carmien. Cook did the revision, and editing was by Johnson, Jon Pickens, Brian Pitzer, Edward G. Sollers, Stephen D. Sullivan, and Steve Winter.

In 2000, Wizards of the Coast released Slavers, a sequel adventure for 2nd edition AD&D rules. The sequel is also set in Greyhawk, and takes place ten years after the conclusion of the events in A1–4.

In 2002, Kenzer and Company published a HackMaster module based on Scourge of the Slave Lords, named Smackdown the Slavers.

All four modules of the A-series were included as part of the Against the Slave Lords hardcover collection, released on June 18, 2013. Also included was the newly-written fifth adventure A0: Danger at Darkshelf Quarry. The hardcover includes a foreword written by each of the four surviving designers of the original modules. David Cook writes: "In the early days of TSR, we were still feeling things out, learning what we could and couldn't do. It was in a previous GEN CON Game Fair that we had heard murmurs that the AD&D tournament needed some work. We hadn't realized until then how much the tournament could be, should be, a showcase event. The players who came to Wisconsin deserved a deliberately crafted experience, something that could show TSR and AD&D in the best possible way." Harold Johnson writes: "Our goal was to provide a model for a new type of adventure that encouraged DMs to use strategy to challenge the players to think. Up to this point, adventures presented monsters that attacked and fought to the death. We wanted to show that even weak monsters could be dangerous when played intelligently." Allen Hammack writes: "Some people have asked about names in the modules. Yes, I have fun with words. Combining Latin and Greek, pulling player and character names from my campaign, and twisting the results so they sounded right when I heard them—all were in the bag of tricks. "Suderham," for example, combined elements that to me meant "south home" (a nod to my Alabama roots), and was also a tip of the hat to my artist friend, the late, great Dave Sutherland. 'Ayares the Cutpurse' reflected my long-standing annoyance with the Internal Revenue Service." Lawrence Schick writes that he was inspired by an idea from Harold Johnson: "In his campaign one night, Harold had our characters get captured, whereupon he took away all our stuff and threw us in a dungeon. The challenge: escape without relying on all our carefully hoarded adventuring gear. Were our characters people with skills and brains, or were they really just lists of equipment?"

The original TSR product codes for modules A1, A2, A3 and A4 are 9039, 9040, 9041, and 9042 respectively.

== Reception ==
Elisabeth Barrington reviewed Slave Pits of the Undercity in 1981, in The Space Gamer No. 35. She felt that the art was neat and organized, and on par with other art from TSR, although she felt that the maps required thorough study before play, as they are slightly too small for quick reference. Barrington felt that the module would not require much re-working, stating that it is "Recommended as is for AD&D enthusiasts."

Anders Swenson reviewed Slave Pits of the Undercity for Different Worlds magazine and stated that "Slave Pits of the Undercity is a reasonable adventure. If you like to purchase published modules for your campaign, you will probably find that the quality of this adventure compensates for its relative brevity, considering the price."

Secret of the Slavers' Stockade was reviewed in Different Worlds magazine in November 1981. The reviewer complained that the module was poorly edited, and that it would have been easier to use with a roster of monsters provided. However, he said the module was "reasonably well done" overall, and a "good, workman-like" adventure. He praised the development of the antagonists and the care to characterize the reactions of the various monsters.

Anders Swenson reviewed Assault on the Aerie of the Slave Lords and In the Dungeons of the Slave Lords for Different Worlds magazine and stated that "The two dungeon modules are quite different in style. The Assault on the Aerie of the Slave Lords for all is complexity is basically a pair of rather ordinary graph paper style dungeons, just like the ones we all have constructed from time to time [...] In contrast, In the Dungeons of the Slave Lords, while basically an underground crawl, is a seemingly realistic, (by FRP standards), situation."

All four modules were reviewed by Jim Bambra in issue No. 33 of White Dwarf magazine, who scored them 7 out of 10 as a whole, and reported A4 as the best adventure. He felt they were tough and held some surprises for players used to hack-and-slash dungeons. He also said Dungeon Masters needed to be creative and adaptive in describing dungeon rooms and remember that the occupants were dynamic and reacted to characters. Bambra was very critical of the editing done on the modules and pointed out several mistakes, concluding that "these modules should never have been released with such errors".

Ken Rolston reviewed Scourge of the Slavelords for Dragon magazine #133 (May 1988). Rolston felt that a lot of the new material added to develop the Slavelords campaign was "quite good, particularly the first two new chapters of campaign material which bring the characters up to the original A1-4 scenarios". He noted that the scenarios from the four original tournament designs were mostly unchanged, and that the designs are "superior examples of their genre, though some are more suited to campaign play". He concluded the review with an evaluation stating: "The quality of the new campaign material varies from excellent to acceptable, but at its best, it’s really satisfying. As a campaign pack, we’re talking a minimum of nine big gaming sessions (and probably more; if the DM develops the campaign outlines and additional encounters). It’s occasionally clumsy and unconvincing, but what it lacks in polish and refinement it makes up for in sheer mass, energy, and fiendishness."

Lawrence Schick, in his 1991 book Heroic Worlds notes that Slave Pits of the Undercity has "Some ingenious situations."

Scourge of the Slave Lords was ranked the 20th greatest Dungeons & Dragons adventure of all time by Dungeon magazine in 2004.

Dungeon Master for Dummies lists Slave Pits of the Undercity as one of the ten best classic adventures.

According to Lev Lafayette of RPGNet, Slave Pits of the Undercity is a fairly good dungeon crawl. It has problems, such as a too-small font and underdeveloped storyline. On the other hand, Lafayette felt that its difficulty was appropriate for characters level 4–7, and that the tournament scoring system worked well. Lafayette called Secret of the Slavers Stockade "the low point of the four A series modules". Although he liked that it had forty pages, he also felt the artwork was sparse, and that the module was overly difficult for its intended character levels.

Scott Taylor of Black Gate in 2015 rated the Slave Lords series as #2 in "The Top 10 Campaign Adventure Module Series of All Time, saying "as it is legendary both in name and artwork, as well as having been done in two supermodule reprints, I have to say it certainly is a classic among classics."
