= The Lost City (Dungeons & Dragons) =

Dungeons & Dragons adventure module

- Code: B4
- TSR product code: 9049
- Rules required: Dungeons & Dragons
- Character levels: 1–3
- Campaign setting: Mystara
- Authors: Tom Moldvay
- First published: 1982

Linked modules
- In Search of the Unknown (B1), The Keep on the Borderlands (B2), Palace of the Silver Princess (B3), The Lost City (B4), Horror on the Hill (B5), The Veiled Society (B6), Rahasia (B7), Journey to the Rock (B8), Castle Caldwell and Beyond (B9), In Search of Adventure (B1-9), Night's Dark Terror (B10), King's Festival (B11), Queen's Harvest (B12), Ghost of Lion Castle (BSOLO)

The Lost City (B4) is a Dungeons & Dragons adventure module by Tom Moldvay. It was first published by TSR in 1982 and was designed as a stand-alone adventure for use with the Dungeons & Dragons Basic Set. The working title for the module was "The Lost City of Cynidicea". Moldvay designed the module as a low-level scenario to give novice Dungeon Masters experience in fleshing out adventures such that it is only partially complete. The plot involves the player characters discovering a ruined subterranean city slowly rising out of the sands. The adventure is set inside a huge step pyramid, with the lower pyramid only sketched out and the city itself described with a list of the major areas and a map. The adventure's main villain is Zargon, a giant one-eyed monster and his minions. The entire double pyramid, not including the city, contains over 100 rooms.

This module includes a cover folder with maps and a descriptive booklet with ready-made adventurers for the Dungeons & Dragons Basic Game. It also includes enough information to continue the adventure beyond level 3, using the Dungeons & Dragons Expert Game rules. This adventure was partially reprinted in the supermodule compilation B1–9 In Search of Adventure (1985), which included only the upper pyramid and was set in the Mystara campaign setting.

== Plot summary ==
The adventure involves a city buried in the desert, which is dominated by multiple warring factions. Much of the adventure takes place within an enormous step pyramid. Other areas of the city are merely outlined, with suggestions provided for the Dungeon Master (DM) to create further detail.

At the beginning of the adventure, characters become lost in a desert sandstorm and stumble upon the entrance to a pyramid. The pyramid and the underground city beneath it are located on the site of the ancient ruined city of Cynidicea and inhabited by the descendants of the city's people. These Cynidiceans, now regressed to a subterranean species, are addicted to narcotics and spend most of their time in drug-induced reveries, wandering around in costumes and masks.

As the adventure progresses, the characters discover that a monster known as Zargon was responsible for the downfall of Cynidicea. The monster still lives, and a cult of evil human priests and various other monsters has grown up around it. Besides the priests of Zargon, there also exist three other factions of relatively normal Cynidiceans. They worship the city's ancient Gods and are dedicated to the overthrow of the priests of Zargon and the restoration of Cynidicea's lost glory, but their diverging faiths have kept them from working together against their common enemy.

Although only the upper half of the pyramid is detailed, enough information on the lower half and the underground city is provided for the DM to expand the adventure. After clearing the upper pyramid the players can become involved in the struggle for Cynidicea and, if they grow powerful enough, confront Zargon in his lair and destroy him.

== Publication history ==
The Lost City was written by Tom Moldvay and illustrated by Jim Holloway. It was published by TSR in 1982 as a 32-page book with an outer folder; the first printing was 3-hole punched.

Dragon magazine revisited the setting with "Mystara: Return to the Lost City" in issue #315.

The module was the inspiration for a 3rd edition D&D adventure, "Masque of Dreams," which was printed in Dungeon #142. The adventure was written by B. Matthew Conklin and illustrated by Michael William Kaluta.

Zargon and the Cynidiceans received a re-interpretation in the 3.5 edition product, Elder Evils, which places the temple in the default, Greyhawk-like setting.

Goodman Games has announced the fourth entry into their licensed Original Adventures Reincarnated line of 5th edition Dungeons & Dragons hardcovers to be an update to B4 The Lost City at Gen Con 2019, aiming for a Summer 2020 release. At the Gen Con panel, staff working on the project said they would greatly expand on the original module, fully mapping out and stocking the parts of the module which were only mentioned, and originally left to the Dungeon Master to expand upon. As such, Goodman Games claims the publication will feature enough content to be a campaign setting unto itself.

A remastered version of the adventure was published in the anthology Quests from the Infinite Staircase for Dungeons & Dragons 5th edition on July 16, 2024.

== Reception ==
Anders Swenson reviewed The Lost City for Different Worlds magazine and stated that "The Lost City disappointed me since I expected better work from Mr. Moldvay, and because I wanted an adventure which really was centered around a lost city. It depends on what you expect an adventure to be about, I suppose. I don't mind interesting monster-slaughter, but I also enjoy role-playing and problem-solving. I think it's a shame that an introductory game such as this one should be so heavily skewed to one phase of adventure gaming, at the expense of the others."

To commemorate the 30th anniversary of the Dungeons & Dragons game, Erik Mona and James Jacobs chose their Top Thirty Greatest Dungeons & Dragons adventures of all time, and ranked The Lost City in 28th place.

Ken Denmead of Wired included the module as an installment in his column "Top 10 D&D Modules I Found in Storage This Weekend". According to Denmead, "with this module, things are clearly detailed to a certain point, and then the rest is left for the DM to "Expand the Adventure," including a final confrontation with the evil "God" who helped bring down the civilization, and eventual discovery of the remnants of the people living a strange, drug-addled life of mushroom farming beside a subterranean lake."

The French RPG magazine La Gazette du Donjon gave this adventure a rating of 4 out of 5, saying, "The Lost City appears at first glance to be a gigantic dungeon, but adventurers have an opportunity to try diplomacy with the different factions. The desperate history of the Cynidiceans can give rise to quite rich and even surprising developments."
