= Palace of the Silver Princess =

Dungeons & Dragons adventure module

- Cover of the 2nd (green) edition, with art by Erol Otus depicting a decapus.
- Code: B3
- TSR product code: 9044
- Rules required: D&D Basic Set
- Character levels: 1-3
- Campaign setting: Generic D&D
- Authors: Jean Wells; Tom Moldvay
- First published: 1980

Linked modules
- B1, B2, B3, B4, B5, B6, B7, B8, B9, B1-9, B10, B11, B12, BSOLO

Palace of the Silver Princess is an adventure module originally published by TSR in 1980 for the Dungeons & Dragons Basic Set. It was recalled on the same day it was released, then rewritten and re-released some months later. The original version, with an orange cover, was written by Jean Wells. When the orange version was recalled (and most copies destroyed), the module was rewritten by Tom Moldvay and released with a green cover in 1981. Writing credit on the second version was given to both Moldvay and Wells, although there was very little of Wells' original content in Moldvay's version.

Palace of the Silver Princess contains a single D&D adventure laid out in a format suitable for a single gaming session. The module includes game maps on the unattached outside cover.

== Plot summary of first (orange) edition ==
The player characters hear rumors of a palace once inhabited by a silver princess who owned a beautiful ruby. The palace was destroyed by a red dragon, but the ruby may still be hidden somewhere in the ruins. Inside the palace, the adventurers encounter treacherous thieves, monsters, traps, treasure, secret doors and passages, illusions to trap the unwary, and a ruby guarded by ghosts. Several rooms of the palace have been left empty for the gamemaster to fill in with monsters and treasure of their own.

== Plot summary of second (green) version ==
The module has been described as a low-level scenario, which involves the legends regarding a ruined palace, a white dragon, and a giant ruby. The player characters encounter evil creatures that have taken over the palace. The plot of Palace of the Silver Princess revolves around a country frozen in time by a strange red light. The only seemingly unaffected location and the apparent source of the glow is the royal palace. The adventurers must restore the flow of time and save the country.

== Publication history ==
In 1980, Jean Wells, the only woman in TSR's design department, was assigned to write an adventure for the "B" (Basic) series that would teach new players how to play D&D using rules for the D&D Basic Set. This module would be unique as it was the first TSR adventure authored by a female designer. She consulted her editor, Ed Sollers, about every detail, and the result was B3 Palace of the Silver Princess. In keeping with the design of the first D&D module of the "B" series, B1 In Search of the Unknown by Mike Carr, Wells left several rooms and areas of the module incomplete so that players could customize those areas themselves. As she related, "I was trying to show the players that there was more to a 'dungeon' than just the building. I didn't complete the palace, trying to show them this map could be a mini base map for their game. The players could discover the part of the dungeon that had been caved in wasn't any longer and the DM could expand it. I was assuming that they were trying to learn to set up their own world and I was trying to help."

During the editorial process, Wells wanted to replace artwork by Erol Otus that had transformed her new three-headed monsters called "ubues" into hermaphrodites with the heads of TSR staffers and management. However, she was told that it was too late, since replacing the artwork would cause unreasonable printing delays.

Original "orange version"

On the eve of publication, when the cartons of printed modules arrived at TSR headquarters ready for shipping, someone in TSR's upper management objected strongly to the module. Some sources state that the objectionable content was four pieces of artwork by Erol Otus and Laura Roslof that were too overtly sexual. These included "The Illusion of the Decapus" by Laura Roslof, wife of Jim Roslof, in which a woman tied up by her own hair was being tortured by demonic-looking figures. Author Jim McLauchlin points out that at the time, some people were claiming that D&D promoted devil worship, and during this 'Satanic Panic', "the image posed a very real threat to the company's bottom line." However, Frank Mentzer later claimed that the objectionable art was rather tame compared to that released in some other products of the time, and that the real reason was the Erol Otus caricatures of TSR executives in the illustration of the ubues. Other people employed at TSR at the time agree that management found this particular illustration objectionable, but disagree as to who was being caricatured. Lawrence Schick, then the head of the creative department, believes that Otus was portraying fellow creative staff members. Editor/game developer Kevin Hendryx states that it was recently terminated employees that were illustrated, and that "upper management was very sensitive about mutiny in the ranks at the time and took all these perceived slurs or snoot-cockings as an insult and a challenge." Wells herself related that another member of the design department complained to senior executive Kevin Blume, and that subsequently she and her editor, Ed Sollers, were called into a meeting and asked to explain why a module designed for a younger audience contained S&M.

The end result was that the entire print run of 5,000–10,000 copies of what became known as the "orange version" — because of its orange cover design — was destroyed. The copies that had already been sent out to stores were ordered to be recalled, and that night the personal copies handed out earlier that day to employees were removed from their desks; the few copies employees had taken home that night were not confiscated, but the rest were dumped in a Lake Geneva landfill, along with all the copies TSR was able to reclaim that had been shipped out.

The entire module was subsequently rewritten by Tom Moldvay, who changed the plot, replaced most of Wells' new monsters with standard monsters from the 1981 Dungeons & Dragons Basic Set and removed the empty areas. Moldvay reimagined Wells' Decapus monster as a forest hunter, while her Archer Bush was included with more minor changes. In addition, the four contentious pieces of artwork, as well as many others, were replaced. The new version was then released with a green cover, with writing credit given to both Moldvay and Wells, although the new version contained little of Wells' original content other than the setting.

== Reception ==
Anders Swenson reviewed the second (green) edition for Different Worlds magazine and stated that "this is a reasonable adventure package for novice GMs and/or players. Everything has been explained in detail, with a proficient use of the language, leaving very little to the industry of the GM. The Palace of the Silver Princess is a good buy for new GMs or new players who want an easy start in the hobby."

Jim Bambra reviewed the green edition of Palace of the Silver Princess for White Dwarf magazine, giving it a 10/10 and calling it "an excellent introduction to the game for new DMs and players, being fairly simple to complete and play." He made note of the glossary of unfamiliar terms for the Dungeon Master to reference and helpful hints on play, and concluded with the suggestion that Palace of the Silver Princess should replace The Keep on the Borderlands in the D&D Basic Set.

The French RPG magazine La Gazette du Donjon reviewed the French translation of the green version by Tom Moldvay and gave it a rating of 2 out of 5, calling it, "A good big classic adventure of treasures and monsters, but with a little story. This module is ideal for a team of beginner players who want to discover the mechanics of the game."

== Legacy ==
Only a few copies of the orange cover version survived, making it a very collectible item. Four years after the orange version was destroyed, a copy sold for $300 at the 1984 Gen Con game fair auction. Twenty-four years later, in 2008, a copy in VF/SW (very fine/slight warp) condition sold at auction for $3050, at the time the highest confirmed sale price for any single non-unique TSR D&D module. One copy, signed by Jean Wells, sold for $5,860. In 2011, a few copies were still available from out-of-print resellers; in shrink-wrapped, near mint condition these were priced at $1300–$1500.

In retrospect, Lawrence Schick believes that "the actual content of it is only mildly eccentric by current standards" and that the entire imbroglio was caused by an over-reaction on the part of TSR's management team. "It’s more a matter of what a light it shines on the management reaction at the time, and the 'Satanic Panic.'"

After Wizards of the Coast took over TSR, they posted an article on their official website that recounted the history of Palace of the Silver Princess, and included a downloadable PDF copy of the original module.
