= Night's Dark Terror =

Dungeons & Dragons adventure module

- Code: B10
- TSR product code: 9149
- Rules required: Dungeons & Dragons
- Character levels: 2 - 4
- Campaign setting: Mystara
- Authors: Jim Bambra, Graeme Morris and Phil Gallagher
- First published: 1986

Linked modules
- B1, B2, B3, B4, B5, B6, B7, B8, B9, B1-9, B10, B11, B12, BSOLO

Night's Dark Terror is an adventure module for the Dungeons & Dragons (D&D) fantasy role-playing game written by British game designers Jim Bambra, Graeme Morris, and Phil Gallagher. It was designed specifically for campaigns transitioning from the D&D Basic Set to the D&D Expert Set. The player characters (PCs) journey from a farmstead into uncharted wilderness, where they encounter new hazards and contend with a secret society. The adventure received a positive review from White Dwarf magazine.

== Plot summary ==
Night's Dark Terror is a wilderness scenario in which the player characters travel on a river and through the mountains, going from the Grand Duchy of Karameikos into the more chaotic lands. The module is set in the Eastern Karameikos area. The characters find a town that has come under siege by goblins, and they also explore a ruined city and a lost valley. The PCs explore more than 20,000 square miles (52,000 km^{2}) of wilderness, with eighteen locations, including multiple smaller dungeons, a riverside village, and a frontier town. The secret society known as the Iron Ring troubles the player characters throughout the adventure, and the introduction provides information on the group.

The module is designed to help the Dungeon Master (DM) make use of wilderness conditions, and presents rules on how to handle weather. The module also includes statistics for eleven new monsters, and comes with a battle map and counters intended for use in a battle in one of the towns.

== Publication history ==
B10 Night's Dark Terror was published by TSR in 1985 as a 64-page booklet, a map, and a cardstock counter sheet, with two outer folders. Night's Dark Terror was written in the UK by Jim Bambra, Graeme Morris, and Phil Gallagher, working for TSR UK Ltd. The module is described as "A Special Basic/Expert Transition Module" intended for character levels 2-4, for campaigns that are being upgraded from the Basic Set to the Expert Set.

The module includes a 56-page booklet, a large double-sized fold-out map, a smaller color map sheet, and a sheet of die-cut counters. The maps measure 22” x 34”, and the cardboard counters are for use with the Battlesystem supplement. The module features cover art by Brian Williams, and interior art by Helen Bedford.

== Reception ==
Graeme Davis reviewed Night's Dark Terror for White Dwarf No. 78. Davis felt that the farmstead in the adventure's opening was nicely detailed, and that the counters to play out the action on the 25mm scale map for that location were a nice idea. He commented on the plot of the adventure, "There is enough here to keep the fastest-moving party going for some time, and a section of suggestions for further adventures can help the GM to open out a long-running campaign in the area." Davis did note that the numbering system for wilderness locations was confusing, with an example where a location has one designation at one part in the module, and at a later point the location has a different designation which does not correspond with anything on the map. However, Davis felt that everything else in the module was written and laid out very well, and that the module would be a tremendous help for any game master learning the Expert rules.

Ken Rolston reviewed D&D module B10 Night's Dark Terror in brief for Dragon magazine No. 124 (August 1987). Rolston called Night's Dark Terror "the best-illustrated and best-designed module I've ever seen—and the adventure and campaign material is every bit as remarkable as the graphic presentation."

In his 1991 book Heroic Worlds, Lawrence Schick describes the adventure as an "Outstanding wilderness scenario... that 'bridges the gap' between the D&D Basic and Expert rules."

== See also ==
- List of Dungeons & Dragons modules
