= Darlene (artist) =

American artist

- Born: Darlene Jean Pekul
- Occupation: Freelance artist
- Notable work: Full-color map of the Flanaess accompanying Gary Gygax’s folio edition of the World of Greyhawk Fantasy Game Setting
- Website: http://darlenetheartist.com/

Darlene (born Darlene Jean Pekul in 1954) is an American artist and calligrapher whose artwork appeared in early Dungeons & Dragons works published by TSR. Her best-known piece, the full-color map of the Flanaess that accompanied the 1980 folio edition of the World of Greyhawk by Gary Gygax, was used as the basis of all subsequent Greyhawk publications and maps until Greyhawk publications were discontinued by Wizards of the Coast in 2008.

== Early life ==
Darlene was born in Wisconsin. The third of seven children, she grew up on a farm near Elkhorn, Wisconsin. Her mother was an artist, and Darlene followed in her footsteps, becoming a member of the Geneva Lake Arts Association at a young age. She made her first professional gallery sale before the age of 16. After graduating from Elkhorn High School in 1972, she enrolled at Beloit College and majored in art. In 1975, as part of her studies, she spent a term in London, England, where she also studied calligraphy. She graduated cum laude in 1976 with a B.A. in Studio Art, and moved to Lake Geneva, where she eked out a living as a graphic artist by holding down three part-time jobs simultaneously. In 1979, she helped co-found The Wisconsin Calligrapher's Guild and served as the first editor of its newsletter.

== Freelance fantasy artist ==
In 1977, Mike Carr, one of the first employees of TSR, met Darlene, when he went to a local graphics shop to order brochures for Gen Con. He and Darlene started dating, and Carr used his influence at TSR to get her some freelance art assignments. One of her first assignments was to design and produce an outdoor sign for TSR's building in Lake Geneva. She made the sign in the shape of a medieval shield and painted a dragon on one side and the TSR logo on the reverse.

In 1979 and 1980, she received many freelance art and calligraphy assignments, including artwork for:

- Dungeon Master's Guide
- Deities & Demigods
- an accessory book called The Rogues Gallery.
- cover art for the adventure In Search of the Unknown

=== Map of the Flanaess ===
In 1980, she was given the opportunity to create the piece of art for which she is best known, the full-colour map of the Flanaess that accompanied Gary Gygax's folio edition of the World of Greyhawk Fantasy Game Setting. Gygax was busy transforming his home D&D campaign called "Greyhawk" into a publishable form. His long-range plan - left incomplete when he was ousted from TSR in 1985 - was to create an entire fantasy world; however when he asked TSR's printing house about the maximum size of paper they could handle, the answer was just 34 in × 22 in (86 cm × 56 cm). He found that, using the scale he desired, he could only fit the northeast corner of one continent on two of those sheets. He placed the city and castle of Greyhawk roughly in the centre of the map, in an area that would have about the same temperate climate as his home in Lake Geneva, and made a rough sketch of the rest of the map, an area he called the "Flanaess". Darlene was given the assignment of developing a full color map on a hex grid from Gygax's prototype map.

=== Jasmine ===
Shortly before World of Greyhawk was published, Darlene created the cover art for Dragon magazine issue 37. This issue also carried the first episode of "Jasmine", her color comic strip about a princess whose realm was coveted by an evil prince. The strip ran for 12 issues before being cancelled for not appealing to the magazine's mostly male readers. Darlene tried to a promote a petition at Origins '81 to have the comic strip brought back, but it gathered few signatures. Shortly after this, she designed and produced the card game Jasmine: The Battle for the Mid-Realm. Although reviews in Gameplay and The Dragon were good - Merle Rasmussen wrote, "Jasmine incorporates a few old ideas with many new ones to create a fresh approach in card gaming." - an expected expansion deck never materialized.

=== Further freelance assignments ===
Darlene continued to take assignments from TSR, and between 1981 and 1984, her work appeared in White Plume Mountain, Investigation of Hydell, Monster Cards Set 3, the boxed set of the updated and expanded World of Greyhawk Fantasy Setting, and Legends & Lore.

Darlene drew the cover art for the KABAL role-playing game (1982).

== Post-fantasy career ==
In the fall of 1983, Pekul left the world of fantasy and moved to Cortona, Italy to study calligraphy, medieval illumination, and book binding as art forms. In 1984, she returned to the U.S., enrolling in Graphic Design at Indiana University Bloomington. She also legally changed her name to just Darlene, dropping her surname Pekul as well as legally changing the typography of her name to a capital and small capitals. She graduated with a Master of Fine Arts in 1987, and she moved to Plainville, Connecticut with her first husband Michael Price, where she became a freelance graphic artist and taught calligraphy and art classes. She developed an interest in Native American spirituality and art, and later an interest in Egyptian art.

== More maps ==
She briefly returned to the fantasy art world in 2003. When Gary Gygax had been ousted from TSR in 1985, he had lost creative rights to all of his published Greyhawk material. However, he still had all of his own notes from his Greyhawk home campaign, and decided to publish details of the original castle and city in six volumes. Since Wizards of the Coast (WotC) still owned the rights to the name Greyhawk, Gygax changed the name of the castle to Castle Zagyg - the reverse homophone of his own name. Gygax also changed the name of the nearby city to "Yggsburgh", a play on his initials E.G.G. In 2005, Troll Lord Games published Volume I, Castle Zagyg: Yggsburgh. This 256-page hardcover book contained details of Gygax's original city, as well as its personalities and politics.

Gygax had gotten in touch with Darlene at this time, and she agreed to create a two-part fold out map of the Yggsburgh environs. She said in an interview, "I accepted the cartography assignment cheerfully because it appealed to the poet within me. Since I created the original Greyhawk map, it seemed only fitting to also create this new world of Gary's as well."

== Personal life ==
After the end of her first marriage, Darlene began a relationship with occult author Vincent Bridges, and for many years they lived in Mount Gilead, North Carolina. Together they founded Aethyrea Books and published several books about the occult.

After over twenty years in Mount Gilead, Bridges moved to Prague so that he could produce a play, "The Donkey and the Cradle", in a historic residence of occultist Edward Kelley, but Bridges died on July 25, 2014, the very day the play was to premiere.

== Legacy ==
The map Darlene had created for the original World of Greyhawk Fantasy Game Setting in 1980 continued to be the basis of all future Greyhawk maps, adventures and campaigns created by both TSR and WotC for the next 38 years - including the massively shared Living Greyhawk campaign (2000–2008). However, when Wizards of the Coast introduced the fourth edition of D&D in 2008, publication of new Greyhawk material was discontinued.
