= Rahasia =

Dungeons & Dragons adventure module

- Cover art by Jeff Easley
- Code: B7
- TSR product code: 9115
- Rules required: Dungeons & Dragons Basic Set
- Character levels: 1-3
- Authors: Tracy and Laura Hickman
- First published: 1980, 1983 and 1984

Linked modules
- B1, B2, B3, B4, B5, B6, B7, B8, B9, B1-9, B10, B11, B12, BSOLO

Rahasia is an adventure module, self-published by DayStar West Media in 1980 and published by TSR, Inc. in 1983 and 1984, for the Basic Set rules of the Dungeons & Dragons fantasy role-playing game. Its product designation is TSR 9115. It was designed by Tracy and Laura Hickman, and features artwork by Jeff Easley and Timothy Truman.

== Plot summary ==
In RPGA1 Rahasia, the player characters seek to rescue an elf maiden kidnapped and held in the Temple of the Sacred Black Rock, where they must break a curse, and take the evil Rahib prisoner.

In the revised module B7 Rahasia, the characters must rescue a group of elf women from the dungeons below a good elven temple that an evil cleric has taken over.

An elven village is threatened by a dark Priest known only as the Rahib. He has kidnapped two of the village's fairest maidens and now demands that Rahasia, the most beautiful elf, surrender herself to free the others. The player characters are drawn into this adventure when they find a plea for help from Rahasia. The only way to free the captured maidens is to enter an old temple, built upon the ruins of a wizard's tower buried under a mountain.

== Publication history ==
The original Rahasia was written by Laura Hickman, and was first published in 1979 by DayStar West Media as a 32-page booklet. Daystar West Media was Tracy Hickman's private publishing company, and no more than 200 copies were ever printed. Rahasia was the first adventure published for the Night Ventures line.

The Hickmans privately published the first two adventures that they wrote together, Rahasia and Pharaoh, which had become popular locally. However, the business associate Tracy was working with left the Hickmans to cover $30,000 in bad checks. They went into bankruptcy, and Tracy decided to sell their adventures to TSR, "literally so that I could buy shoes for my children". TSR decided not only to buy the modules, but hire Tracy as a game designer: "They said it would be easier to publish my adventures if I was part of the company. So, we made the move from Utah to Wisconsin."

Tracy and Laura Hickman rewrote Rahasia, which was published by TSR in 1983 as a sixteen-page booklet with an outer folder, with the code RPGA1, and was sold a limited edition available only to RPGA members. In 1984, TSR revised and compiled RPGA1 Rahasia and the second tournament module RPGA2 Black Opal Eye, and published the combined adventure as B7 Rahasia, a 32-page booklet with an outer folder, featuring cover art by Jeff Easley and interior art by Easley and Tim Truman.

This module was later featured in the compilation B1–B9 In Search of Adventure in 1987.

=== Credits ===
Design: Tracy and Laura Hickman
Editing: Curtis Smith
Cover Art: Jeff Easley
Interior Art: Jeff Easley and Timothy Truman
Cartography: David S. "Diesel" LaForce and David C. Sutherland III
Art Direction: Ruth Hoyer

ISBN 0-88038-113-2

== Reception ==
In Issue 73 of The Space Gamer, Wayne Ligon commented "A nice story combined with an interesting temple complex makes this module a good one. The villains are well-portrayed and have definite objectives." Ligon felt that this was a good module because the emphasis is not on killing, and the adventure forces the players to think.

The French RPG magazine La Gazette du Donjon gave this adventure a rating of 2 out of 5, saying "Rahasia offers a delicate challenge to adventurers since they must avoid killing their bewitched opponents. Some encounters are interesting, but there are still some areas for improvement. Finally, let us note the classic introduction: the call to aid a captive princess."

== See also ==
- List of Dungeons & Dragons modules
