= Burned Bush Wells =

Role-playing game adventure

Cover art by Larry Elmore, 1984

Burned Bush Wells is an adventure published by TSR in 1984 for the Old West role-playing game Boot Hill.

== Plot summary ==
In the middle of winter, the player characters ride into the small range town of Burned Bush Wells, Nebraska, with a load of furs to sell. They soon find themselves embroiled in a dispute as the wealthy businessman Lyle Underway tries to take over the entire town by forcing smaller business owners out.

Burned Bush Wells is an adventure which consists of nine short scenarios or encounters and one longer adventure.

== Publication history ==
The Old West combat and role-playing game Boot Hill was one of TSR's first products, published in 1975, only a year after Dungeons & Dragons. No other supporting material was published until 1981, when TSR released Mad Mesa, the game's first adventure. Several more adventures followed, including Burned Bush Wells, the fourth Boot Hill adventure, a 32-page book with a tri-fold cover published in 1984 that was written by Jeff Grubb with contributions by Allen Hammack and Brian Blume, and interior and cover art by Larry Elmore.

== Reception ==
In Issue 16 of Imagine, Doug Cowie liked the adventure, noting that it "continues the honourable tradition of Boot Hill modules. They don't get the recognition they deserve because the game is not that popular. Strange really, considering the fact that Western games are the apogee of the role-playing hobby." Cowie concluded with a strong recommendation, saying, "Anyone running any kind of Western RPG should nip out immediately and buy a copy of BH4 Burned Bush Wells".

Rick Swan in his book The Complete Guide to Role-Playing Games recommended this adventure as "a classic Western scenario set in the dead of winter."
