= Laura Roslof =

American fantasy artist

- Born: Laura Miller; November 12, 1948; DeKalb, Illinois, U.S.
- Died: April 2, 2018 (aged 69); Elkhorn, Wisconsin, U.S.
- Known for: Fantasy art, stained glass
- Spouse: Jim Roslof

Laura S. Roslof (November 12, 1948 – April 2, 2018) was an American artist. She and her husband, Jim Roslof, worked for TSR, Inc. during the "golden age" of Dungeons & Dragons. Laura was best known for creating a contentious piece of art for the D&D adventure Palace of the Silver Princess.

== Early life ==
Laura Roslof (née Miller) was born November 12, 1948, in DeKalb, Illinois to Edward and Hildegard (Vilser) Miller. On April 28, 1968, at age 20, she married Jim Roslof.

== At TSR ==
In 1981, both Laura and Jim were working in the art department at TSR, where Jim had been promoted to Art Director after TSR manager Kevin Blume summarily fired most of the other artists. Jean Wells was writing a new Dungeons & Dragons adventure, Palace of the Silver Princess, and had created a new monster, the decapus, that used illusions to lure adventurers into its clutches. The text for the room housing the decapus read "A beautiful young woman hangs from the ceiling. Nine ugly men can be seen poking their swords lightly into her flesh, all the while taunting her in an unknown language and pulling at what few clothes she has on. Part of her ankle length hair has been wrapped around her legs, securely binding them together, while the rest of her hair has been used to tie her hands to a ceiling beam." Laura Roslof was given the task of creating interior art for this. The result was a half-page illustration titled "The Illusion of the Decapus", showing a scantily-clad young woman tied up with lengths of her own hair while surrounded by leering goblin-like creatures.

When the cartons of the new adventure arrived at TSR headquarters ready for shipping, shortly after copies were distributed to staff, someone in TSR's upper management strongly objected to the module. Wells later said that another member of the design department complained to Kevin Blume about "Illusion of the Decapus", and that subsequently Wells and her editor, Ed Sollers, were called into Kevin Blume's office and asked to explain why a module designed for a younger audience contained S&M.

The end result was that Kevin Blume ordered the entire print run of what became known as the "orange version" — because of its orange cover — to be destroyed, the only time that TSR took such a step. The copies already sent out to stores were recalled, and that night someone went around the office, removing from employees' desks the personal copies that had been handed out earlier that day. The few copies that employees had taken home that night were not confiscated, but the rest ended up in a Lake Geneva landfill, along with all the copies TSR could reclaim from those already shipped out.

The entire module was subsequently rewritten by Tom Moldvay, who changed the plot, replaced all of Wells' new monsters with standard monsters from the Monster Manual, and replaced Laura Roslof's contentious illustration with new artwork. The replacement version was then released with a green cover.

== After TSR ==
After leaving TSR, the Roslofs moved to Elkhorn, Wisconsin, where Laura opened an art studio. She and Jim remained married for 42 years, until Jim's death in 2011. They raised three children, and at the time of Laura's death, she had four grandchildren.

== Legacy ==
At the height of TSR's market dominance, the perceived sexuality of Laura Roslof's "The Illusion of the Decapus" resulted in the almost complete destruction of an entire TSR D&D adventure, making it a very collectible item. At the 1984 Gen Con game fair auction, a copy sold for $300. Twenty-four years later, in 2008, a copy in VF/SW (very fine/slight warp) condition sold at auction for $3050, at the time the highest confirmed sale price for any single non-unique TSR D&D module. In 2011, a few copies were still available from out-of-print resellers; in shrink-wrapped, near mint condition these were priced at $1300–$1500.
