= Horror on the Hill =

Dungeons & Dragons adventure module

- Cover art by Jim Roslof.
- Code: B5
- TSR product code: 9078
- Rules required: Dungeons & Dragons Basic Set
- Character levels: 1–3
- Campaign setting: Mystara
- Authors: Douglas Niles
- First published: 1983

Linked modules
- B1, B2, B3, B4, B5, B6, B7, B8, B9, B1-9, B10, B11, B12, BSOLO

Horror on the Hill is an adventure module published by TSR, Inc. in 1983, for the Basic Rules of the Dungeons & Dragons fantasy role-playing game. Its product designation was TSR 9078. This 32-page book was designed by Douglas Niles, and features cover artwork by Jim Roslof. It is intended for beginning gamemasters and 5–10 player characters of levels 1–3. The module contains around 20 encounters on the surface, a monastery, three dungeon levels and three new monsters.

== Plot summary ==
Horror on the Hill is an adventure in which the player characters assault a three-level dungeon in a cavernous labyrinth to stop a growing army of goblins and hobgoblins.

The scene of the action is Guido's Fort, located at the end of a road, with only the River Shrill, a mile wide, separating it from "The Hill". At the Fort, hardy bands of adventurers gather to plan their conquests of The Hill, the hulking mass that looms over this tiny settlement. They say the Hill is filled with monsters, and that an evil witch makes her home there. No visitor to The Hill has ever returned to prove the rumors true or false. Only the mighty river Shrill separates the player characters from the mysterious mountain.

A series of caves awaits, full of goblins and hobgoblins. At the lowest layer lies a young red dragon. It is set on a volcanic island in the midst of a river.

== Publication history ==
Horror on the Hill was written by Douglas Niles, with a cover by Jim Roslof and interior art by Jim Holloway, and was published by TSR in 1983 as a 32-page booklet with an outer folder.

This module is designed for use with the D&D Basic Rules. Included in the module are 11 maps, 3 new monsters, and a complete set of prerolled characters.

This module was later featured in the compilation B1-B9 In Search of Adventure in 1987.

== Reception ==
In Issue 6 of Fantasy Gamer, Rick Swan thought this adventure was "clearly written and easy to follow". However, Swan found most of the module predictable, saying, "much of Horror on the Hill will seem overly familiar to experienced players ... complete with the usual assortment of creatures and a fairly pedestrian three-level dungeon." Swan also found the map "a confusing tangle of cliffs and trails and as such is pretty useless." Swan concluded, "With no real surprises, Horror on the Hill is best left to the newcomers."

Chris Hunter gave a balanced reviews for the British games magazine Imagine. He criticized the quality of the surface map of the hill and noted several small errors in the text, including discrepancies between the text and the maps. However Hunter noted that the module contained many helpful hints for the novice gamemaster. Hunter also thought that the module gave little detail on the Fort itself, so that it could be easily incorporated into an existing campaign. Overall, Hunter rated the module as "balanced and logical", with the notable exception of one key encounter which he thought "unbelievable". In total, Hunter expected the module would yield 3-4 sessions of play, with "the last one producing a few deaths" if all characters were 1st level. Hunter concluded, "Apart from the hill map and the awful title, Horror on the Hill is a worthwhile addition to the Basic scenario range."

The French RPG magazine La Gazette du Donjon gave this adventure a rating of 2 out of 5, noting it "does not require much thinking or planning to be successful, only some solid fighters and a lot of healing spells ... A module for beginners, very dangerous but also very lucrative, if you don't mind repeating the sequence 'kick the door, kill the monster, take the treasure."

== See also ==
- List of Dungeon & Dragon modules
