= Castle Caldwell and Beyond =

Tabletop role-playing game adventure for Dungeons & Dragons

Castle Caldwell & Beyond
- Code: B9
- TSR product code: 9143
- Rules required: Dungeons & Dragons Basic Set
- Character levels: 1 - 3
- Campaign setting: Mystara
- Authors: Harry W. Nuckols
- First published: 1985

Linked modules
- B1, B2, B3, B4, B5, B6, B7, B8, B9, B1-9, B10, B11, B12, BSOLO

Castle Caldwell and Beyond is an adventure module published by TSR, Inc. in 1985, for the Basic Rules of the Dungeons & Dragons fantasy role-playing game. Its product designation was TSR 9143.

== Plot summary ==
Castle Caldwell and Beyond is an adventure module containing five short scenarios in which the player characters defeat the creatures they encounter in a castle and its dungeons, save an imprisoned princess, escape from a prison themselves, and find and return a holy relic that belongs to a church.

The module contains five short adventures. The first two, The Clearing of Castle Caldwell and Dungeons of Terror, are designed as connected, successive adventures, while the remaining three are stand-alone scenarios.

- The Clearing of Castle Caldwell: A local merchant has recently purchased a small castle, but when he tried to move in, he discovered that it was already inhabited. The adventurers are hired to explore and clear out the castle.
- Dungeons of Terror: A strange trap door in the floor of Castle Caldwell leads into a mysterious dungeon in which the characters end up trapped. The only way out is to find the means for opening a secret door hidden within the dungeon.
- The Abduction of Princess Sylvia: Just before her marriage to the prince of a neighboring realm to settle the conflict between their countries, Princess Sylvia is kidnapped by the henchmen of a party who does not want peace to come. The adventurers are to infiltrate the hideout of the culprits and rescue the princess from her captors.
- The Great Escape: In this adventure, the player characters start as prisoners of an enemy army, locked in a cell in a behind-the-lines outpost. Their first priority is to escape the cell and recover their weapons, then clear the outpost of enemy forces.
- The Sanctuary of Elwyn the Ardent: A legendary holy artifact has been stolen, and all traces point to the mysterious Elwyn the Ardent. The players must enter Elwyn's fortress and fight their way through a number of traps and monsters, all under Elwyn's scornful watch and taunting words.

== Publication history ==
B9 Castle Caldwell and Beyond was designed by Harry Nuckols, and features cover artwork by Clyde Caldwell, and was published by TSR in 1985 as a 32-page book with an outer folder. The book also features interior art by Doug Watson.

This module was later featured in the compilation B1-B9 In Search of Adventure in 1987.

== Credits ==
Design: Harry W. Nuckols
Editing: Michael S. Dobson
Brand Manager:
Cover Art: Clyde Caldwell
Interior Art: Doug Watson
Cartography: David S. "Diesel" LaForce
Typesetting: Betty Elmore
Art Direction: Ruth Hoyer
Electronic Prepress Coordination:
Playtesters:

Distributed to the book trade in the United States by Random House, Inc., and in Canada by Random House of Canada, Ltd. Distributed to the toy and hobby trade by regional distributors. Distributed in the United Kingdom by TSR UK Ltd.

Product Code: TSR 9143
ISBN 0-88038-200-7

== See also ==
- List of Dungeons & Dragons modules
