= Mad Mesa =

Mad Mesa cover

Mad Mesa is a 1981 role-playing game adventure published by TSR for Boot Hill.

== Plot summary ==
Mad Mesa is an adventure in which a lone drifter navigates the dangerously gun‑happy town of Mad Mesa in a solo scenario that can also be run for a full group under a gamemaster. It is a solo or multi-player adventure that was set in the wild west.

== Publication history ==
Mad Mesa was written by Jerry Epperson and Tom Moldvay, with art by Bill Willingham and published by TSR in 1981 as a 32-page book with an outer folder.

== Other recognition ==
A copy of the Boot Hill module Mad Mesa is held in the collection of The Strong National Museum of Play (object 110.1979).
