= The Veiled Society =

Dungeons & Dragons adventure module

- Cover art by Steve Chappell
- Code: B6
- TSR product code: 9086
- Rules required: Dungeons & Dragons Basic
- Character levels: 1 - 3
- Campaign setting: Mystara
- Authors: David "zeb" Cook

Linked modules
- B1, B2, B3, B4, B5, B6, B7, B8, B9, B1-9, B10, B11, B12, BSOLO

The Veiled Society is an adventure module for the Basic Rules of the Dungeons & Dragons fantasy role-playing game published in 1984. The adventure's product designation is TSR 9086.

== Plot summary ==
The Veiled Society is an adventure scenario which takes place in the city of Specularum, where the player characters must investigate a murder to find out which of three rival factions is responsible. In the violent city of Specularum, the Veiled Society has spies everywhere. Specularum is the capital of the Grand Duchy of Karameikos, and the adventure involves the party in a struggle between the city's three major families (the Vorloi, Radu, and Torenescu).

== Publication history ==
The sixteen-page booklet with an outer folder was published by TSR in 1984 and designed by David "Zeb" Cook. It features cover artwork by Steve Chappell with interior illustrations by Jim Roslof. The module includes cardstock miniatures and sixteen pages of fold-together pieces which form nine cutout houses and a cutout gate.

The module was featured in the compilation B1-B9 In Search of Adventure in 1987.

== Reception ==
In Issue 63 of the British game magazine White Dwarf, Graham Staplehurst felt this adventure had "all the hallmarks of a classic adventure" despite what he felt were the "useless" cutouts. Staplehurst commented that having the adventure set in Specularum "provides players with almost unparalleled opportunity for personal choice and freedom for action", calling the adventure "true rolegaming and high drama", adding that the characters "must make the decisions of a real-life adventurer — and suffer the consequences!" Staplehurst observed that the adventure's possibilities are structured to be used by less experienced gamemasters, but each situation was detailed enough to allow for a variety of outcomes. Staplehurst felt that the plot read too much like a crude detective story, and provided the players with little motivation. This, he felt, left extra preparatory work for any DM who planned to weave the city into their campaign and make use of existing character histories, for the scenario to work to its full potential. Staplehurst concluded by giving the adventure a rating of 9 out of 10.

In his 1991 book Heroic Worlds, Lawrence Schick called this adventure "more thought-provoking than your usual hack-and-slash Basic scenario".

The French RPG magazine La Gazette du Donjon gave this adventure a rating of 4 out of 5, saying that this module "offers a true renewal of the genre by giving us an urban adventure. There are no big surprises, but it is effective. A major difference with other Basic Set scenarios is that the characters could end up at the end with Powerful Enemies."

== See also ==
- List of Dungeons & Dragons modules
