= Journey to the Rock =

Dungeons & Dragons adventure module

- Cover art by Larry Elmore
- Code: B8
- TSR product code: 9106
- Rules required: D&D Basic Set
- Character levels: 1 - 3
- Campaign setting: Mystara
- Authors: Michael Malone
- First published: 1985

Linked modules
- B1, B2, B3, B4, B5, B6, B7, B8, B9, B1-9, B10, B11, B12, BSOLO

Journey to the Rock is an adventure module written by Michael Malone and published by TSR, Inc. in 1985, for the Basic Rules of the Dungeons & Dragons fantasy role-playing game. It is intended for player characters of level 1-3.

== Summary ==
Journey to the Rock is a wilderness adventure scenario, which presents rules for adventuring in the wilderness. The wizard Lirdrium Arkayz wants to know the secret of 'The Rock' and hires the characters to uncover it. The player characters must journey through a hazardous countryside by choosing one of three possible travel routes to get to the Rock.

== Publication history ==
Journey to the Rock was written by Michael Malone, with a cover by Larry Elmore and interior art by Doug Watson, and was published by TSR in 1985 as a 32-page booklet with an outer folder.

== Reception ==
In Issue 30 of the British games magazine Imagine, Wendy J. Rose felt that the plot was sound if unoriginal and that the module was noteworthy as, unusually, almost all the action took place outdoors. Rose noted there were plenty of good opportunities for roleplaying, rather than just "hack-and-slay" and the module contained several interesting new monsters. However, Rose also criticized the quality of production, which was "rough in places"; space was wasted by repetition of rules; and the writing was "stilted". Rose also warned that the gamemaster had to be very familiar with the module, but noted that it compared favorably with the other modules written for the Basic Set, calling it a "good buy".

In Issue 2 of The V.I.P. of Gaming Magazine, Allen Varney noted that this module "is not a 'hack-and- slash' adventure. There is fighting, to be sure, but this adventure requires wits and skill to go along with brawn ... It is also different from most modules because it is a wilderness, rather than a dungeon adventure." Varney warned, "The end of the adventure is going to surprise even the most experienced of players." Varney thought the module played smoothly, commenting, "It is designed well, and the encounters are balanced for the levels involved. Even experienced players will enjoy it." Varney concluded, "Journey to the Rock is worth the money, for it will surprise everyone who plays it. It is a change from most modules that only call for brute force, and you will enjoy the change of pace. Definitely recommended."

The French RPG magazine La Gazette du Donjon gave this adventure a rating of only 1 out of 5, saying, "This module takes place mainly outdoors, but the weakness of the story and its extreme linearity means that this scenario is the worst in the B series. Players are nothing more than secondary instruments in a story in which they are only spectators."

== See also ==
- List of Dungeons & Dragons modules

== In popular culture ==
This module was lampooned by the website Something Awful on July 22, 2010.
