= Boot Hill Referee's Screen and Mini-Module =

Boot Hill Referee's Screen and Mini-Module is a 1981 role-playing game supplement published by TSR for Boot Hill.

== Contents ==
Boot Hill Referee's Screen and Mini-Module is a supplement in which a gamemaster's screen is packaged with a short scenario that lets player characters reenact the James–Younger Gang's final Northfield, Minnesota shootout. It includes reference tables and charts in a single accessory, with the included mini-module "Shootout in Northfield and Other Famous Gunfights".

== Publication history ==
Referee's Screen and Mini-Module was written by Tom Moldvay and published by TSR in 1981 as a cardstock screen with an 8-page booklet.
