= Tower of Ulission =

Role-playing game supplement

- Authors: Dave Emigh
- First published: 1979

Tower of Ulission is an adventure for fantasy role-playing games published by Judges Guild in 1979.

== Contents ==
Tower of Ulission is an adventure that was used as the tournament dungeon for the Winter War IV gaming convention, and features a journey through the wilderness that goes past several "dead cities," in which the player characters reach the "dead village" of Ulission. This adventure continues into its second half, Sword of Hope.

The Tower of Ulission sends the player characters on a wilderness trek to a small city populated by various creatures such as undead and minotaurs.

== Publication history ==
Tower of Ulission was written by Dave Emigh, and was published by Judges Guild in 1979 as a 32-page book.

== Reception ==
Elisabeth Barrington, reviewing The Tower of Ulission in The Space Gamer No. 28, notes that the adventure is well mapped out and presented, and contains exhaustive material for dungeon masters to use in their descriptions, but that the internal arrangement of the material could lead to some confusion. She concludes her review by saying, "Even so, DMs of all levels of skill should find Tower of Ulission relatively simple, whether to adapt to their own tastes or to play as it stands. The game flows well and requires little more from the DM than reading the booklet."
