= Range War! =

Range War! is a 1984 role-playing game adventure published by TSR for Boot Hill.

== Plot summary ==
Range War! is an adventure in which a detailed guide to Promise City embroils the player characters in a simmering cattlemen‑versus‑sheepherders range war, offering a keyed town, extensive character rosters, and multiple linked short scenarios to explore the conflict.

== Publication history ==
Range War! was written by Peter Taterczynski with art by Larry Elmore and published by TSR in 1984 as a 32-page book with an outer folder.
