= Lost Conquistador Mine =

Tabletop role-playing game supplement

Lost Conquistador Mine is a 1982 role-playing game adventure for Boot Hill published by TSR.

== Contents ==
Lost Conquistador Mine is an adventure in which the player characters become involved in nine scenarios in the town of Dead Mule, New Mexico in 1868.

== Reception ==
Richard A. Edwards reviewed Lost Conquistador Mine in The Space Gamer No. 60. Edwards commented that "The ease of use and thoroughness of the adventure and its many scenarios justify the purchase of Lost Conquistador Mine. Any GM interested in the old west should look for this."
