= Boot Hill (role-playing game) =

Old West role-playing game

- Second edition cover, 1979.
- Designers: Brian Blume; Gary Gygax
- Publishers: TSR, Inc.
- Publication: 1975
- Genres: Western

Boot Hill is a western-themed role-playing game designed by Brian Blume, Gary Gygax, and Don Kaye (although Kaye unexpectedly died before the game was published), and first published in 1975. Boot Hill was TSR's third role-playing game, appearing not long after Dungeons & Dragons (D&D) and Empire of the Petal Throne, and taking its name from "Boot Hill", the popular Wild West term for "cemetery". Boot Hill was marketed to take advantage of America's love of the western genre. The game did feature some new game mechanics, such as the use of percentile dice, but its focus on gunfighting rather than role-playing, as well as the lethal nature of its combat system, limited its appeal. Boot Hill was issued in three editions over 15 years, but it never reached the same level of popularity as D&D and other fantasy-themed role-playing games.

== Creative origins ==
First edition cover.

Soon after TSR was formed by Gary Gygax and Don Kaye in late 1973, they and new business partner Brian Blume started development of the rules for a Western genre miniatures combat system and role-playing game called Boot Hill. Kaye in particular was an avid supporter of Boot Hill—he was a fan of the Western genre, and even his fantasy D&D character, Murlynd, was dressed and armed as a cowboy after being magically transported from Gygax's Greyhawk campaign to an alternate universe set in the Wild West.

However, Kaye unexpectedly died of a heart attack in January 1975. Blume and Gygax subsequently published Boot Hill later that year in memory of their friend. It was TSR's third role-playing game, after Dungeons & Dragons and Empire of the Petal Throne. David M. Ewalt, in his book Of Dice and Men, described the game as "the company's second role-playing game; it was set in the Old West and focused mostly on gun-fighting."

== System ==
Boot Hill used game mechanics that were advanced for the time. Most games still used traditional six-sided dice, but Boot Hill was one of the first games to use two ten-sided dice as percentile dice for character abilities and skill resolution. However, several factors limited its appeal.

- Although the western was a popular American motif, the game did not have the same mass appeal as D&D's Tolkienesque fantasy setting.
- Boot Hill focused on gunfighting rather than role-playing. The first edition and second editions were specifically marketed as a miniatures combat game, but even in the third edition, most of the rules concerned combat resolution, with relatively little information about settings and few rules for social interaction.
- Combat could be short and deadly, with death often coming from the first gunshot. This lethality did not change over time since, unlike D&D characters, Boot Hill characters did not advance in levels to develop better defenses or advantages over non-player characters; they remained just as likely to die in their hundredth combat as they had been in their first. As a result, most characters had a very short life span, and players generally had little chance to identify with their player character over the long term, as they could with a player character in D&D.
- Unlike D&D, there was no large catalogue of non-human monsters, only human opponents. In addition, there were no alignment rules, making the difference between the "good guys" and "bad guys" a matter of moral interpretation or choice.

For these reasons, although Boot Hill was published in three editions, none captured the public imagination in the same way as D&D; Boot Hill remained a very small and limited member of TSR's stable of games.

== Publications ==
Mad Mesa cover.

- 1st edition, printed in 1975, 34 pages, no ISBN.
- 2nd edition, printed in 1979, ISBN 0-394-51875-6. Reprinted with a different cover in 1984.
- 3rd edition, printed in 1990, ISBN 0-88038-976-1.

Boot Hill, 2nd Edition was supported by a referee's screen and five 32 page adventure modules:

- Referee's Screen and Mini-Module, ISBN 0-394-52590-6.
- Mad Mesa (BH1), printed in 1981, ISBN 0-935696-71-7, and 1982, ISBN 0-394-52705-4. Written to be playable solitaire, as a gamebook, or as a multiplayer module.
- Lost Conquistador Mine (BH2), printed in 1982, ISBN 0-394-52594-9.
- Ballots & Bullets (BH3), 1982, ISBN 0-394-53067-5.
- Burned Bush Wells (BH4), 1984, ISBN 0-394-53466-2.
- Range War! (BH5), 1984, ISBN 0-88038-105-1.

TSR also released a three-figure pack of gunslinger miniatures for Boot Hill.

Dragon Magazine issue 71 features the Boot Hill module "The Taming of Brimstone" by Donald Mumma which was the winner of a module design contest.

== Reception ==
In the December–January 1979 edition of White Dwarf, Dominic Beddow reviewed the second (boxed) edition of Boot Hill, and gave it an above average score of 8 out of 10. He found few substantive rule changes from the first edition, other than the addition of several appendices to the rulebook that included biographies of notable American gunfighters, suggested scenarios, and a method for transferring characters to and from other TSR roleplaying systems such as Dungeons & Dragons and Metamorphosis Alpha. Beddow was not impressed by the campaign map, which was "by TSR standards, extremely shabby and unprofessional", with large blank areas that "with their generally lazy attitude towards the map, TSR asks you to fill in numerous details, claiming this 'creates flexibility.'" However, he found the large scale map of a generic Western town to be "quite commendable". Overall, Beddow concluded that Boot Hill is such an "Easy yet effective game to play" because of "the knowledge of, and feeling for, the Wild West which is within all of us. It is fantasy and yet one still has one's feet on the ground."

In the 1980 book The Complete Book of Wargames, game designer Jon Freeman called Boot Hill "a game that is well suited to portraying small battles based on the Old West." However, Freeman found that the game was ill-suited to larger battles, noting that "the playing time increases exponentially with the number of individual figures involved." He concluded by giving the game an Overall Evaluation of "Good", saying, "A real campaign would severely test the judgement and resources of the referee and spirit of the players, but because the milieu is so familiar, dropping in for an occasional battle/scenario is a possibility."

In his 1990 book The Complete Guide to Role-Playing Games, game critic Rick Swan gave this game a qualified recommendation, pointing out "As a tactical simulation of Western gunfights, it's unsurpassed. As a role-playing game, there's not really enough here to put together a meaningful campaign." Swan concluded by giving the game a rating of 3 out of 4, saying, "Boot Hill works best as a board game, where players rough out a city map on a tabletop or floor, then use miniature figures to stage showdowns."

In a retrospective review of Boot Hill in Black Gate, James Maliszewski said "Far from being disappointed, I was frankly amazed at how enjoyable the game was and found myself itching to continue playing, even after we'd set things aright in Brimstone. Like original Dungeons & Dragons, Boot Hill is a game that punches far above its weight class. It's yet another reminder that there is no better combination than slim rules and imagination when it comes to RPGs. That was true thirty years ago, when I last played Boot Hill, and it's true today."

== Other recognition ==
A copy of the Boot Hill module Mad Mesa is held in the collection of The Strong National Museum of Play (object 110.1979).
