= Queen's Harvest =

Dungeons & Dragons adventure module

- Code: B12
- TSR product code: 9261
- Rules required: Dungeons & Dragons
- Character levels: 1 - 3
- Campaign setting: Mystara
- Authors: Carl Sargent
- First published: 1989

Linked modules
- B1, B2, B3, B4, B5, B6, B7, B8, B9, B1-9, B10, B11, B12, BSOLO

Queen's Harvest is a 1989 adventure module for the Dungeons & Dragons role-playing game. Queen's Harvest picks up the story where B11 King's Festival left off; it can be played as a sequel to that adventure or by itself. Tailored for beginning Dungeon Masters and players, it is set in the country of Karameikos in the Mystara campaign setting, and contains adventuring tips for players.

== Plot summary ==
Queen's Harvest is an adventure in which the player characters get pulled into royal politics, and must retrieve the dangerous objects a wizard left in his lair before he died. The first half of the adventure presents a basic dungeon, while the second half offers an extended siege of an enemy stronghold where the player characters are greatly outnumbered and outgunned. They must slowly whittle away their adversaries, then withdraw to regroup and heal.

== Publication history ==
B12 Queen's Harvest was written by Carl Sargent and published by TSR in 1989 as a 32-page booklet with an outer folder. Editing was done by Jim Lowder. Its product code is TSR 9261, and it is the sequel to B11 King's Festival.

== Reception ==
Ken Rolston reviewed Queen's Harvest for Dragon magazine in July 1991. He felt that Queen's Harvest is more elaborate than King's Festival in its role-playing and tactical challenges, and that the basic dungeon presented had a smart design and interesting story. With regard to the portion of the adventure involving the siege of an enemy stronghold, he felt the "clear and detailed discussion and organization of the defenders' tactics and motives" creates the opportunity for players to incite "discord among defenders". He did point out a minor flaw: there is no tactical map of the Queen's Keep. He concluded the review by stating that King's Festival and Queen's Harvest "are absolutely the best introductory adventures in print for D&D-game-style fantasy role-playing games (FRPGs). Presented simply and clearly enough for young folks, these adventures are also challenging and entertaining enough for experienced gamers."
