= KABAL Player Record Pads =

1982 role-playing game

KABAL Player Record Pads is a 1982 role-playing game supplement published by Kabal Gaming Systems for KABAL.

== Contents ==
Player Record Pads is a supplement in which a player's aid provides character sheets.

== Publication history ==
Player Record Pads was written by Ernest T. Hams and published by Kabal Gaming Systems in 1982 as a pad of 50 sheets.
