= Black Opal Eye =

Dungeons & Dragons adventure module

- Code: RPGA2
- Authors: Tracy and Laura Hickman
- First published: 1983

Black Opal Eye is an adventure module published in 1983 for the Dungeons & Dragons fantasy role-playing game.

== Plot summary ==
Black Opal Eye is an adventure scenario and sequel to RPGA1 Rahasia, in which the player characters search the ancient ruins of a castle for the threat against the elves.

== Publication history ==
RPGA2 Black Opal Eye was written by Tracy and Laura Hickman, and published by TSR/RPGA in 1983 as a 16-page booklet with an outer folder. The module was a limited edition, sold only to members of the RPGA.

This adventure was later collected with RPGA1 Rahasia into B7 Rahasia.
