= Ballots & Bullets =

Ballots & Bullets is a 1982 role-playing game adventure published by TSR for Boot Hill.

== Plot summary ==
Ballots & Bullets is an adventure in which a bundle of seven chaotic election‑themed short scenarios plunges Promise City into a trigger‑happy, corruption‑soaked vote where hundreds of non-player characters scheme, cheat, and shoot their way through a thoroughly crooked contest.

== Publication history ==
Ballots and Bullets was written by David James Ritchie with art by Jim Holloway and published by TSR in 1982 as a 32-page book with an outer folder.

== Reviews ==
- Papyrus (Issue 7 - 1992)
