= Sword of Hope (Judges Guild) =

- Authors: Dave Emigh
- First published: 1980

Sword of Hope is an adventure for fantasy role-playing games published by Judges Guild in 1980.

== Contents ==
Sword of Hope is a tournament dungeon in which the player characters must delve into the Caverns of Gar in search of parts of a magic sword. This adventure is the sequel to Tower of Ulission.

Sword of Hope is an adventure in which the player characters must explore the Caverns of Gar for the Dwarven Forge to find and return with the sword Myrlani which had been lost in battle.

== Publication history ==
Sword of Hope was written by Dave Emigh, and was published by Judges Guild in 1980 as a 32-page book. Although approved for D&D, the cover was printed as approved for AD&D; when distributed, "Advanced" was covered by a Judges Guild sticker.

== Reception ==
Elisabeth Barrington reviewed Sword of Hope in The Space Gamer No. 28. She commented that "The background information in Tower of Ulission is not essential to Sword of Hope. Barrington added: "Sword of Hope assumes a reasonable amount of intelligence and wit on the part of both the characters and the Dungeon Master. Cryptic clues and warnings give the character a challenging and interesting trip. If they misunderstand or disregard the warnings, well... All the maps are clear and without unnecessary clutter; almost all odd possibilities are accounted for." She continued: "Unless the DM is the bloodthirsty type, he should warn the players to use very few low-level characters, as some of the creatures are fairly nasty. Some of the cryptic clues are a bit too cryptic; as a result, much time may be lost in aimlessly wandering around or trying to puzzle out the solutions." Barrington concluded her review by saying, "Everything considered, Dave Emigh presents the fantasy game world with a very good piece of work. Sword of Hope is organized; nothing essential is left out, yet there is room for any changes or modifications the DM wishes to make. This supplement is recommended for experienced DMs and players, as no small familiarity with the D&D system is needed."

Patrick Amory reviewed Sword of Hope for Different Worlds magazine and stated that "Most of the adventure is taken up in searching for the keys to the door of the cavern in which the sword supposedly is. The clues to the locations of the keys are printed on the door. But why would those who locked up the sword print the means to get to it on the door? And then the adventure never actually tells us where the sword is!"

== Reviews ==
- Different Worlds #8 (Jun 1980)
