= The Rogues Gallery =

1980 role-playing game accessory

- Authors: Brian Blume with Dave Cook and Jean Wells
- Genre: Role-playing game
- Publisher: TSR
- Publication date: 1980
- Pages: 48

The Rogues Gallery is an accessory for the first edition of the Advanced Dungeons & Dragons fantasy role-playing game.

== Contents ==
The Rogues Gallery is a supplement for the Dungeon Master containing hundreds of non-player character listings, with characters from each of the first edition AD&D character classes, and game statistics for characters originally played in Gary Gygax's home Dungeons & Dragons campaign.

== Publication history ==
The Rogues Gallery was written by Brian Blume with Dave Cook and Jean Wells, with a cover by Erol Otus and interior illustrations by Jeff Dee and Otus, and was published by TSR in 1980 as a 48-page book. TSR Stock # 9031. ISBN 0-935696-18-0.

The 2nd Edition "Rogues Gallery" was published by TSR in 1992 as an unbound sheaf of papers suitable for use in a binder. REF6 Accessory. TSR Stock # 9380. Retail price was US$12.95. ISBN 1-56076-377-9.
