= Ghost of Lion Castle =

Dungeons & Dragons adventure module

- Code: BSOLO
- TSR product code: 9097
- Rules required: Dungeons & Dragons
- Character levels: Solo
- Campaign setting: Mystara
- Authors: Merle M. Rasmussen
- First published: 1984

Linked modules
- In Search of the Unknown (B1), The Keep on the Borderlands (B2), Palace of the Silver Princess (B3), The Lost City (B4), Horror on the Hill (B5), The Veiled Society (B6), Rahasia (B7), Journey to the Rock (B8), Castle Caldwell and Beyond (B9), In Search of Adventure (B1-9), Night's Dark Terror (B10), King's Festival (B11), Queen's Harvest (B12), BSOLO

Ghost of Lion Castle is a 1984 adventure module for the Dungeons & Dragons fantasy roleplaying game. Its module code is BSOLO, and it was written by Merle M. Rasmussen with cover art by Bob Maurus.

== Plot summary ==
Ghost of Lion Castle is an adventure scenario intended for a single low-level player character. It also includes rules for solo combat, in which the character explores a castle in the shape of an enormous lion.

Ghost of Lion Castle is a Basic D&D adventure that can be played in a few hours, in which the solitary character can be heir to the wizard Sargon who haunts Lion Castle as a ghost. The player can choose between six pre-generated magic-user or elf characters or use their own player character of third level or lower. Either way, the character can only use the modified spells listed in the adventure. The player has access to the maps of the main interior of Lion Castle, which are printed on three of the six panels of the cover. The character has rations for only twelve days upon reaching the outer wall, and must prevail against wandering monsters and deadly traps to receive a blessing from Sargon.

This adventure is intended for one player only, who makes all of the choices and enjoys all of the rewards. A mighty wizard once lived in Lion Castle, but he is a ghost now, haunting those halls, and waiting for an heir. It is said that he is a great cat that sits upon the northern grasslands, waiting to pounce on adventurers just like the player characters.

== Publication history ==
Ghost of Lion Castle was written by Merle M. Rasmussen, and published by TSR in 1984 as a 32-page booklet with an outer folder.

== Reception ==
C. Mara Mallory reviewed Ghost of Lion Castle in The Space Gamer No. 75. Mallory commented "The 'R' rules entries are a 'programmed introduction' to the programmed game entries. The 'magic journal' of notes down the page edges enables you to leave messages for future characters, as well as note changes in the contents of a room when you loot it or die there – all to lend greater realism in replays. While valuable room contents are often for either a magic-user or a fighter (not both), fortunate probing and good rolls with wandering monsters can net some valuable treasures and experience for a developing D&D character." The reviewer continued "Unless you read maps and directions, you may lose your way in the castle entries, confused by four similar tower staircases and entries with as many as twelve alternative action choices. Well-rendered but sparse interior illustrations do little to clarify entry descriptions. And while it is possible to fight your way through Lion Castle on your own, magical combat is set up to be virtually unplayable without the Basic D&D rules."

Mallory concluded the review by saying "Not as complex and involved as the invisible-ink solo modules, Ghost of Lion Castle offers little for anyone but the Basic D&D gamer trying to gain experience for a low-level character. The 'magic journal' does enhance replayability, and there is adequate material for a gamemaster to use the module to create a new adventure. But those who are looking for a challenging solo would do well to look elsewhere."
