= Slavers (Dungeons & Dragons) =

Dungeons & Dragons adventure module

- Code: 11621
- Rules required: 2nd Ed. AD&D
- Character levels: 4 - 5
- Campaign setting: Greyhawk
- Authors: Sean K Reynolds & Chris Pramas
- First published: 2000

Linked modules
- Scourge of the Slave Lords; Slavers

Slavers is an adventure module for the Dungeons & Dragons roleplaying game.

== Publication history ==
The 128-page book was published by Wizards of the Coast in April 2000 for second edition Advanced Dungeons & Dragons rules. The adventure is a sequel to the Scourge of the Slave Lords series (modules A1 - A4), being set in the World of Greyhawk campaign setting ten years after the events described in the earlier adventures.

Slavers was written by Sean K. Reynolds and Chris Pramas. The module's cover art is by Jeff Easley, with interior art by Wayne Reynolds, David Roach and Sam Wood. Slavers is designed for five to eight characters of levels 4 - 5.

== Reception ==
The reviewer from Pyramid noted that Slavers is full of references to the old Scourge of the Slave Lords series, including locations, events and NPCs, "making it a lot more enjoyable for fans of the classic modules".

== See also ==
- Slave Lords
