= King's Festival =

Dungeons & Dragons adventure module

- Code: B11
- TSR product code: 9260
- Rules required: Dungeons & Dragons
- Character levels: 1 - 3
- Campaign setting: Mystara
- Authors: Carl Sargent
- First published: 1989

Linked modules
- B1, B2, B3, B4, B5, B6, B7, B8, B9, B1-9, B10, B11, B12, BSOLO

King's Festival is an adventure module for the Dungeons & Dragons fantasy role-playing game.

== Plot synopsis ==
King's Festival is an adventure scenario set in Karameikos. It functions as both a guide for beginning DMs and an introductory dungeon. The player characters (PCs) must rescue a cleric from a group of orcs to ensure that the King's Festival happens.

The presentation in King's Festival is simple, streamlined, and easy to follow, with staging hints and advice for first-time DMs, and concise setting detail in the read-aloud sections. Pre-rolled PCs are included for a quick start, and a pull-out Combat Sequence Table is included on the Player Reference Sheet. Also provided are a few recommended rules, adaptations, and clarifications, such as giving beginning PCs no less than a minimum number of hit points at 1st level to avoid starting a character at one hit point.

== Publication history ==
B11 King's Festival was written by Carl Sargent, with a cover by Clyde Caldwell and interior illustration by Valerie Valusek, and was published by TSR in 1989 as a 32-page booklet with an outer folder. Editing is by Jim Lowder. King's Festival is TSR product number 9260. B12 Queen's Harvest is the sequel to this adventure.

== Reception ==
Ken Rolston reviewed King's Festival for Dragon magazine in July 1991. He found the pull-out Combat Sequence Table a big help in conducting his Basic D&D game combat: "The summary and reference charts are effectively employed to help organize information for the rookie DM." Rolston felt that Carl Sargent did not "take a radical enough step to remedy the 1st-level character's chronic vulnerability to death from a couple of consecutive whacks from even weedy monsters", and suggested an alternative allowing a character to go unconscious and bleed to death unless bandaged by another character. He felt that the adventure "offers a quick, simple dungeon with a plenty of tricks and action and a few nifty touches". Rolston concluded the review by saying that King's Festival and Queen's Harvest "are absolutely the best introductory adventures in print for D&D-game-style fantasy role-playing games (FRPGs). Presented simply and clearly enough for young folks, these adventures are also challenging and entertaining enough for experienced gamers."

== See also ==
- List of Dungeons & Dragons modules
