= In Search of the Unknown =

Dungeons & Dragons adventure module

- The cover of the 1981 reprint of In Search of the Unknown, with art by Darlene Pekul
- Code: B1
- TSR product code: 9023
- Rules required: D&D Basic Set
- Character levels: 1–3
- Campaign setting: Generic D&D
- Authors: Mike Carr
- First published: 1978

Linked modules
- In Search of the Unknown (B1), The Keep on the Borderlands (B2), Palace of the Silver Princess (B3), The Lost City (B4), Horror on the Hill (B5), The Veiled Society (B6), Rahasia (B7), Journey to the Rock (B8), Castle Caldwell and Beyond (B9), In Search of Adventure (B1–9), Night's Dark Terror (B10), King's Festival (B11), Queen's Harvest (B12), Ghost of Lion Castle (BSOLO)

In Search of the Unknown is a module for the Dungeons & Dragons roleplaying game, designed for use with the Basic Set of rules. It was written by game designer Mike Carr and was first published in 1978 by TSR, Inc. The module details a hidden complex known as the Caverns of Quasqueton. Reviewers considered it a good quality introduction to the game that was written in the so-called dungeon crawl style, where the primary goal of the players is the exploration of a dangerous labyrinth to battle monsters and obtain treasure.

== Publication history ==
The module was included with the first edition of the D&D Basic Set. The module was written by Mike Carr, and printed as a 32-page booklet with an outer folder and a two-color cover; the original version also included a section on page six for "Using this Module with AD&D". The AD&D section was deleted in the 1981 printing. The adventure ran through six different printings in addition to a pre-production version that appeared in promotional artwork. The first printing was in 1978, although an incorrect copyright lists it as 1979.

In Search of the Unknown was an introductory adventure scenario which included advice on how Dungeon Masters (DMs) can learn to create their own dungeons. Mike Carr intended it for use as an instructional adventure for new players. The module is a beginner's scenario, which allows the DM to add monsters and treasure. The module is coded B1 because it was created as the first adventure for the Dungeons & Dragons Basic Set, though it is possible to convert it to Advanced Dungons & Dragons. The adventure is designed for characters of first to third level, and was written for DMs and players with little or no gaming experience. Interior art was by David C. Sutherland III, while Sutherland and David A. Trampier did the cover of the original monochrome edition. The updated 1981 edition featured front and back cover art by Darlene Pekul.

A lengthy introduction explains the workings of the adventure and provides many tips for novice DMs and players. There is a character roster which contains forty-eight first level pre-generated player characters that players can use if they wish, and a section displaying the availability of henchmen and hirelings for use as non-player characters to travel with the party and details of these characters for the DM. The module includes a number of unkeyed rooms and caves meant for the Dungeon Master to fill in with their own monsters and treasure, selected from tables provided in the module.

Jon Peterson, for Polygon, highlighted that Dave Arneson sued TSR over Basic Set royalties in 1977. Peterson wrote "as Arneson's lawsuit loomed, TSR made a very pointed substitution to the contents of the Basic Set: they rotated out the Dungeon Geomorphs and Monster & Treasure Assortment booklets, replacing them with Mike Carr's In Search of the Unknown module. [...] It was a good idea to target a module at beginning dungeon masters — but it also had clear implications for the legal situation. Previously, when Arneson sought a 5% royalty on the whole contents of the Basic Set, he was effectively asking for money that was going into Gygax's pocket. Now, he would instead be asking for money earmarked for his friend Mike Carr". Carr received royalties for In Search of the Unknown when the module was sold alone and when it was included in the Basic Set. After the September 1979 disappearance of James Dallas Egbert III, Dungeons & Dragons received "mainstream notoriety. And with that, sales of the Basic Set rose dramatically. Right before the steam tunnel incident, the Basic Set might have sold 5,000 copies a month. By the end of 1979, it was trading over 30,000 copies per month, and only going up from there". Following Carr's financial success due to his module being included in the boxed set, Gygax changed the module included with the Basic Set to The Keep on the Borderlands, which was a module he wrote.

=== Later versions and reprints ===
The 10th Anniversary Dungeons & Dragons Collector's Set boxed set, published by TSR in 1984, included the rulebooks from the Basic, Expert, and Companion sets; modules AC2 Combat Shield and Mini-adventure, AC3 The Kidnapping of Princess Arelina, In Search of the Unknown, B2 The Keep on the Borderlands, and M1 Blizzard Pass; Player Character Record Sheets; and dice. The set was limited to a thousand copies, and was sold by mail and at GenCon 17.

None of the text or background from In Search of the Unknown was included in the compilation module In Search of Adventure, despite its inclusion in the title. Its map was included in the back of the book as an extra dungeon that the dungeon master may wish to populate and use.

Although B1 is presented as setting neutral, the first printing suggested locations for placing the module in the World of Greyhawk campaign setting (namely, Ratik, Tenh, and the Pale). This information was removed in subsequent printings.

== Plot summary ==
Many years ago two wealthy adventurers, Rogahn the Fearless and Zelligar the Unknown, built a hidden complex known as the Caverns of Quasqueton. From this base, they conducted their affairs away from the prying eyes of civilization. While of questionable ethical standing, the two drove back a barbarian invasion and gained the support of locals. Eventually, they gathered their own army and went on an expedition against said enemies, where they met their demise.

The player characters (PCs) enter the story at this point, hearing a variety of rumors provided in the module. Each PC knows one or more of the stories although the veracity of them is somewhat questionable. The rumors mostly involve a great treasure hidden somewhere in the Caverns of Quasqueton, which the PCs can enter from a cave-like opening.

A variety of monsters wander through the finished upper level of the dungeon including orcs, troglodytes, and giant rats. The DM checks periodically to see if the group encounters these menaces in addition to the dangers in each individual room. Most of the rooms come with blank spots where the DM fills in whatever monster or treasure is most suitable for their campaign.

The finished upper level served as a home for Rogahn and Zelligar and contains much of their personal possessions. A number of traps await an unwary group. Some of these rooms include an area filled with pools (some hazardous and others not) and a wizard's laboratory.

The randomly generated monsters in the lower, unfinished level differ from those above and include zombies and goblins. Some of the pre-filled rooms on this level include a museum, an arena, and grand cavern, but many of the caves on this level include no description at all and the DM must devise contents for these areas.

The end of the module includes a list of foes and treasure for the group to fight and find. It also includes a list of characters of various classes the group might encounter while exploring the dungeon. Also included are a number of pre-generated characters the group might use to play through the adventure.

== Reception ==
With its simple, straightforward plot and design, In Search of the Unknown was regarded as a good introduction to running the D&D game.

Don Turnbull reviewed In Search of the Unknown in issue No. 13 of the magazine White Dwarf (June/July 1979), and gave the module a rating of 9 out of 10. He compared this module to Against the Giants and Descent into the Depths of the Earth, complimenting In Search of the Unknown's "excellent format, for instance, and the comprehensive way in which the scenario is introduced. TSR's high quality has not been in any way compromised." Turnbull criticized the module's use of Roman numerals as references, stating that ordinary numerals do the job much better.

The module was reviewed in Shadis magazine in 1996.

Ken Denmead of Wired listed the module as one of the "Top 10 D&D Modules I Found in Storage This Weekend". According to Denmead, the module is "a classic dungeon crawl for beginning characters".

John Sprunk of Black Gate commented on his recollections of the adventure, as part of the basic D&D box set: "I was hooked from the start, controlling this awesome new game that stretched our imaginations. Even though it’s been more than thirty years, I still remember the cool tricks and traps. Especially the chamber of pools, the teleportation rooms, and the young red dragon I placed in one of the dungeon storerooms just for fun." Commenting on In Search of the Unknown in Black Gate, James Maliszewski said "It held my hand just enough to teach me what dungeon maps should look like and how to stock them. In this purpose, I think it's unsurpassed, which is why I think it a shame that later versions of the Basic Set (both the version I owned and the later 1981 edition) included The Keep on the Borderlands instead. That's no knock against module B2, which is a classic in its own right, but it's not very good as a tutorial for tyros."
