= KABAL =

Fantasy role-playing game

Cover art by Darlene

KABAL (or sometimes K.A.B.A.L. — Knights and Berserkers and Legerdemain) is a role-playing game published by Kabal Gaming Systems in 1982. Critics did not like the mathematical formulae needed to play the game.

== Description ==
KABAL is a fantasy role-playing system. The game includes three booklets: a 24-page "Referee's Guide", a 34-page "Player's Guide", and a 36-page "KABAL Magic Spells". The rules, which are largely derivative of popular role-playing games of the time, cover character creation, skills, combat, magic, 70 spells, monsters, and treasure.

KABAL is notable for the mathematical formulae needed to play the game. For example, to determine a character's height and weight:

1. Height (in meters): Roll 20 six-sided dice, then take the square root of the result and multiply it by 21.5.
2. Weight (in kilograms):
  1. Take the character's height arrived at in Step 1, cube it and multiply the result by the character's Strength. Reserve this number.
  2. Roll 20 six-sided dice, square the result and divide it by the character's Endurance score, then raise it to the .75 power. Add that result to the reserved number from Step 2.1 to arrive at the character's weight.

== Publication history ==
KABAL was designed by Ernest T. Hams, with a cover by Darlene, and published by Kabal Gaming Systems in 1982 as a boxed set with three digest-sized books and 12 reference sheets.

The KABAL Player Record Pads were also published in 1982.

== Reception ==
In Issue 5 of Fantasy Gamer, Scott Haring noted "the system suffers from terrible organization and offers next to nothing new." Haring also pointed out the complex mathematics needed for the game, pointing out, "Standard equipment with this game should not only include paper, dice, and pencils, but a good calculator as well." Despite this, Haring did find a few bright spots, such as the realistic times given for missile fire, commenting, "A beginning character needs five minutes to ready a windlass crossbow for shooting, and can shoot a bow just once every 12 seconds. Experience can cut that time down, but it strikes me as being realistic without being unduly complicated." Haring concluded, "as a stand-alone system, KABAL is complicated, fraught with problems and overly difficult to learn ... for now, I cannot recommend it."

In his 1990 book The Complete Guide to Role-Playing Games, game critic Rick Swan called KABAL "hopelessly derivative", and derided the "mountain of mathematics" needed to play the game. Swan concluded by giving the game a very poor rating of one 1 out of 4, asking "This is supposed to be fun?"

In his 1991 book Heroic Worlds, Lawrence Schick called the game a "Lame fantasy system requiring numerous and complex mathematical calculations."
