= Seren Ironhand =

Seren Ironhand is a 1986 fantasy role-playing game adventure published by Challenges International for The Challenges Game System.

== Plot summary ==
Seren Ironhand is an adventure in which player characters of levels 4-6 embark on a quest to eliminate a river-pirate band, encounter an ancient cat-people race, and explore the dwarven mines of Morandir. The adventure comes with a "royal commission" sheet granting the heroes authority to eliminate the pirates and reclaim wilderness land.

== Publication history ==
Seren Ironhand was written by Tom Moldvay, with a cover by Bob Kraus and Rick Sellers and illustrations by Dave Billman, and published by Challenge International in 1986 as a 32-page book with a royal commission sheet. Seren Ironhand was intended as the second part of a trilogy, although the first and third installments were never published.
