= Jasmine: The Battle for the Mid-Realm =

Jasmine: The Battle for the Mid-Realm is a fantasy-themed card game designed by DARLENE and published by her company Jasmine Publications in 1982. The game is based on DARLENE's graphic adventure Story of Jasmine published in Dragon. Although the game was well received by critics, the original print run did not sell out, and a planned expansion deck was never published.

== Description ==
Jasmine is a card game for up to 4 players. Each player takes one faction led by heroes and villains from the graphic adventure Story of Jasmine:

- Jasmine the heroine
- Bardulf the assassin
- Melantha the evil sorceress
- Thorgall the warrior

Each faction possesses certain special abilities and unique weaknesses, and the game starts with a balance of power between the factions. Drawing cards from the 112-card deck with special magic items or leaders can tip the balance in a player's favor. Each player can hold up to seven cards at a time, and can play them on the Battlefield for combat, or in their home castle for defensive purposes.

There are a number of special cards that can be used to revive dead leaders, negotiate agreements with the other players, or free prisoners.

=== Components ===
The game consists of a rules insert, and a 112-card deck. Each card has a different illustration by DARLENE.

=== Victory conditions ===
A player wins by either being the first to bring three magical items to their castle; or by eliminating the other factions.

== Publication history ==
From May 1980 to April 1981, Story of Jasmine, a comic by DARLENE about a princess whose realm was coveted by an evil prince, appeared in twelve issues of Dragon. The year after Jasmine was discontinued, DARLENE published Jasmine: The Battle for the Mid-Realm through her publishing company Jasmine Publications as a limited production run. Each set was numbered and signed by DARLENE, and was first sold at Gen Con XV. The game received favourable reviews, but the initial print run did not sell out, and although an expansion deck was announced, it was never produced. More than thirty years later, DARLENE was still selling sets from the original print run through her personal website.

== Reception ==
In Issue 69 of Dragon (January 1983), Merle M. Rasmussen noted that "this card game calls for strategic thinking on the part of the players and offers them a wide variety of tactical options." He warned that the rules were complex, and admitted "Playing the game with someone who knew it already was the best way for me to learn the rules." Rasmussen thought the game had a high degree of replayability and found the artwork on the cards exquisite, believing "The artwork is worth the price of the game." He concluded with a recommendation, saying, "Jasmine incorporates a few old ideas with many new ones to create a fresh approach in card gaming.”

Nearly a decade later, in Issue 204 of Dragon, Lester W. Smith compared Jasmine to another old card game, Trial by Pylon by Vincent Miranda, and thought that Jasmine demonstrated "a much better sense of game design."

== Awards ==
At the 1983 Strategist's Club Awards, Jasmine was awarded "Most Outstanding Game of 1982".

== Other reviews ==
- Gameplay
