= Keep on the Borderlands (novel) =

2001 novel by Ru Emerson

- Cover of the first edition
- Author: Ru Emerson
- Language: English
- Genre: Fantasy novel
- Publication date: 2001
- Publication place: United States
- Media type: Print

Keep on the Borderlands is a 2001 fantasy novel by Ru Emerson, set in the world of Greyhawk, and based on the Dungeons & Dragons role-playing game, specifically the adventure B2 The Keep on the Borderlands.

== Plot summary ==
The main characters are predominantly human or elven, leaving out halflings and dwarves. Eddis, a woman mercenary, is the primary protagonist and point of view character. The novel was also set in the World of Greyhawk with scant references to its location.

== Development ==
In November 2001, Wizards of the Coast published Keep on the Borderlands, a novelization by Ru Emerson for the Greyhawk Classics series.

== Reception ==
James T. Voelpel for mania.com comments: "With Keep on the Borderlands, what you see is what you get, and what you get is pulp fantasy. That being said, it is decent pulp fantasy, with Emerson giving us a steady flow of adventure and conflict, monsters and magic. The characters are somewhat one-dimensional, but more fleshed out than what this genre is used to. In keeping with the Wizards of the Coast "Greyhawk" series, the book feels more like an adventure module than a novel. For fans of this type of writing, this is what they want - less talk more magic. Keep on the Borderlands delivers what it promises - action and adventure, with better than average character development and motivation. Sure, this isn't Tolkien or even Eddings, but if this type of fantasy is your forte, give it a chance."
