= The Keep on the Borderlands =

Dungeons & Dragons adventure module

- The cover of The Keep on the Borderlands, with art by Jim Roslof. The artwork depicts a band of heroes in battle.
- Code: B2
- TSR product code: 9034
- Rules required: D&D Basic Set
- Character levels: 1 - 3
- Campaign setting: Generic D&D
- Authors: Gary Gygax
- First published: 1979

Linked modules
- B1, B2, B3, B4, B5, B6, B7, B8, B9, B1-9, B10, B11, B12, BSOLO

The Keep on the Borderlands is a Dungeons & Dragons adventure module by Gary Gygax, first printed in December 1979. In it, player characters are based at a keep and investigate a nearby series of caves that are filled with a variety of monsters. It was designed to be used with the Dungeons & Dragons Basic Set, and was included in the 1979–1982 editions of the Basic Set. It was designed for people new to Dungeons & Dragons.

The Keep on the Borderlands went out of print in the early 1980s, but has been reprinted twice; a sequel was also made. A novelized version of the adventure was published in 2001. The module received generally positive reviews, and was ranked the 7th greatest Dungeons & Dragons adventure of all time by Dungeon magazine in 2004.

== Plot summary ==
Player characters begin by arriving at the keep which they can adopt as a base before investigating the series of caverns in the nearby hills that are teeming with monsters. These Caves of Chaos house multiple species of vicious humanoids. Plot twists include a treacherous priest within the keep, hungry lizardmen in a nearby swamp, and a mad hermit in the wilderness. It typifies the dungeon crawls associated with beginning D&D players, while permitting some limited outdoor adventures.

== Original publication ==
The Keep on the Borderlands was published in 1980. It consists of a 32-page booklet with an outer folder; the module was written by Gary Gygax, with cover art by Jim Roslof and interior illustrations by Erol Otus and David ‘Diesel’ LaForce. It is designed for use with the Dungeons & Dragons Basic Set. It was included in printings 6–11 (1979–1982) of the Basic Set, although it was also available for sale separately. The cover of the first printing included the notation, "With minor modifications, it is also suitable for use with ADVANCED DUNGEONS & DRAGONS"; this was removed from later printings.

The module's cover notes that it is especially designed to help beginning players and Dungeon Masters (DMs). Tips for running encounters appear throughout the text to assist beginning DMs. The module also provides rudimentary rules for wilderness adventures, as these were not included in the D&D Basic Set. The structure of the adventure as a series of separate caves allows segmented playing sessions for beginners. The module has been described as a low-level introductory scenario, which leads the player characters from an outpost on the frontier of law into the forces of chaos.

Jon Peterson, for Polygon, highlighted that Keep on the Borderlands was created after "sales of the Basic Set rose dramatically" following the September 1979 disappearance of James Dallas Egbert III. The financial success of Mike Carr, writer of the previous module included in the boxed set, showed that "a module like this [...] could bring significant income to its author". In early 1980, Carr's module was replaced by Gygax's in the Basic Set.

== Reception ==
Anders Swenson reviewed The Keep on the Borderlands for Different Worlds magazine and stated that "It is well balanced, and suitable for the levels of characters for which it was written. D&D is a good introductory set of adventure gaming rules, and The Keep on the Borderland is a good introduction to D&D."

Kirby T. Griffis, reviewing the adventure in The Space Gamer No. 37, found the module "interesting and full of excitement", though he considered the map sloppily done. He concluded by stating "on the whole, I enjoyed this module and recommend it."

Lawrence Schick, in his 1991 book Heroic Worlds, described the adventure as "A good start for new players" and speculated that at the time, "There probably have been more copies of B2 printed than of any other role-playing scenario."

A retrospective review in Shadis #29 (1996) said that "Keep on the Borderlands was designed with beginners in mind, and may seem quaint to experienced role-players. But that quaintness grows on you as you read through it, and the mix and match quality of the dungeon leaves an impression that's hard to ignore. For a Basic D&D nostalgia trip, there's very little that can match it."

To commemorate the 30th anniversary of the Dungeons & Dragons game, Erik Mona and James Jacobs chose their Top Thirty Greatest Dungeons & Dragons adventures of all time, and ranked The Keep on the Borderlands in 7th place.

Ken Denmead of Wired listed the module as one of the "Top 10 D&D Modules I Found in Storage This Weekend". According to Denmead, the module "should give a party of low-levels a rather challenging time."

Writing for Black Gate in 2014, Scott Taylor listed the cover art of Keep on the Borderlands by Jim Roslof as #8 in The Top 10 TSR Cover Paintings of All Time.

Jon Peterson commented that Keep on the Borderlands is "a classic, beloved module, whose Caves of Chaos owe no particular debt to Carr's Caverns of Quasqueton, though much of Carr's enlightening text about the art of dungeon mastering was effectively paraphrased in Gygax's version. [...] Because Keep on the Borderlands would ship with the Moldvay Basic Set, at the height of the D&D boom in 1981, it became one of the most widely known modules in D&D history, selling 750,000 copies a year. It might never have served as the gateway to adventure for so many players if it hadn't been for a certain legal dispute and its consequences".

The French RPG magazine La Gazette du Donjon gave this adventure a rating of 3 out of 5, saying, "The fortified castle on the borders of the country is a very open introductory module in the sense that it gives free rein to the imagination of the players (and the dungeon master). The context of the castle can serve as a basis for many quests."

In his 2023 book Monsters, Aliens, and Holes in the Ground, RPG historian Stu Horvath noted that this adventure "seems to be the culmination of design experiments that were taking place in the industry at large." Comparing Keep on the Borderlands to contemporaneous rival publications Tegel Manor and Snakepipe Hollow, Horvath called their simultaneous publications in the same year "a moment of parallel innovation ... perhaps an inevitable destination for RPG design."

== Later versions and reprints ==
=== 1984–2000 ===
The 10th Anniversary Dungeons & Dragons Collector's Set boxed set published by TSR in 1984 included the rulebooks from the Basic, Expert, and Companion sets; modules AC2 Combat Shield and Mini-adventure, AC3 The Kidnapping of Princess Arelina, B1 In Search of the Unknown, The Keep on the Borderlands, and M1 Blizzard Pass; Player Character Record Sheets; and dice. The set was limited to a thousand copies, and was sold by mail and at GenCon 17.

The Keep on the Borderlands went out of print in the mid 1980s. However, the module was partially reprinted in the supermodule compilation B1–9 In Search of Adventure (1985), which included the Caves of Chaos but not the keep or surrounding wilderness. A reprinting of the original adventure was made available in the Dungeons & Dragons Silver Anniversary Collector's Edition boxed set in 1999 to celebrate the 25th anniversary of the Dungeons & Dragons game, with slight modifications to make it distinguishable from the original (for collecting purposes).

A sequel was released in 1999, Return to the Keep on the Borderlands for 2nd edition AD&D. The original B2 publication was generic in terms of setting, while the 1999 Return module placed the Keep in Yeomanry, making it a canonical location in the World of Greyhawk. The placement of the Keep in Greyhawk did not match many details in the sequel, such as several non-Greyhawk deities, nations, and peoples. At least two of the non-player character descriptions refer to details from the Mystara setting rather than Greyhawk.

=== 2000–2015 ===
In 2001, Wizards of the Coast published Keep on the Borderlands, a novelization by Ru Emerson for the Greyhawk Classics series. The novel was also set in the World of Greyhawk with scant references to its location.

A hacked version of the module was published for the HackMaster RPG in 2005, and entitled Little Keep on the Borderlands.

In September 2010, the module was re-released for D&D 4th Edition by Wizards of the Coast for use in the weekly D&D Encounters sessions as Keep on the Borderlands: A Season of Serpents. Like the original, this revised module was designed for use with the contemporaneously released Dungeons & Dragons Fantasy Roleplaying Game boxed set for D&D Essentials, which is oriented towards the beginning player. This time, The Keep on the Borderlands is set in the D&D base world of the Nentir Vale, in an area known as the Chaos Scar. The module is "a multi-week adventure as a set of individual encounters, each of which is meant to be run as a single session lasting 1.5 to 2 hours. [...] 'Season of Serpents' is the longest Encounters season ever, with five chapters of four encounters each, resulting in 20 total sessions of play. Considerable effort is expended to differentiate the chapters and the overall play experience; thus, PCs adventure in broadly different areas during each chapter of play. Nonetheless, many GMs found the adventure too long—mainly because it made it hard to bring in new players late in the season, something that matters more in an organized play environment".

A revised edition was released at D&D Expo in January 2012 under the title Caves of Chaos as playtest material for the upcoming 5th edition of Dungeons & Dragons. Players had to sign a non-disclosure agreement before playing the adventure.

=== 2015–present ===
In 2016, the Brazilian publisher Redbox Editora released a remake of The Keep on the Borderlands called O Forte das Terras Marginais for their own retro-clone system Old Dragon. The module was translated and adapted by Rafael Beltrame, chief editor of Old Dragon.

In March 2017 Mike Mearls, Mike Carr, and Chris Doyle announced that Goodman Games had entered a partnership with Wizards of the Coast to publish a collector's edition of The Keep on the Borderland and In Search of the Unknown. In January 2018 Goodman Games announced that the hardback book would be 380 pages in length and contain digital scans of the originals, 5th Edition conversions, additional new content, and "testimonials". The Goodman Games reprint entitled Into the Borderlands appeared in May 2018 as volume one of "Original Adventures Reincarnated".

As part of the 2024 revision to the 5th Edition ruleset, a new starter set titled Heroes of the Borderlands was released on September 16, 2025. It is inspired by the original Keep on the Borderlands and the set includes three booklets: Caves of Chaos, the Keep on the Borderlands, and the Wilderness. In a Polygon review, they described how Heroes of the Borderlands aims to lower the barrier for new players by giving out tools like a quick‑start guide, combat tracker, and abundant physical components.

== In video games ==
Dungeons & Dragons Online released an adaptation of the Keep on the Borderlands adventures in 2019.
