= Mike Carr (game designer) =

American writer and game designer

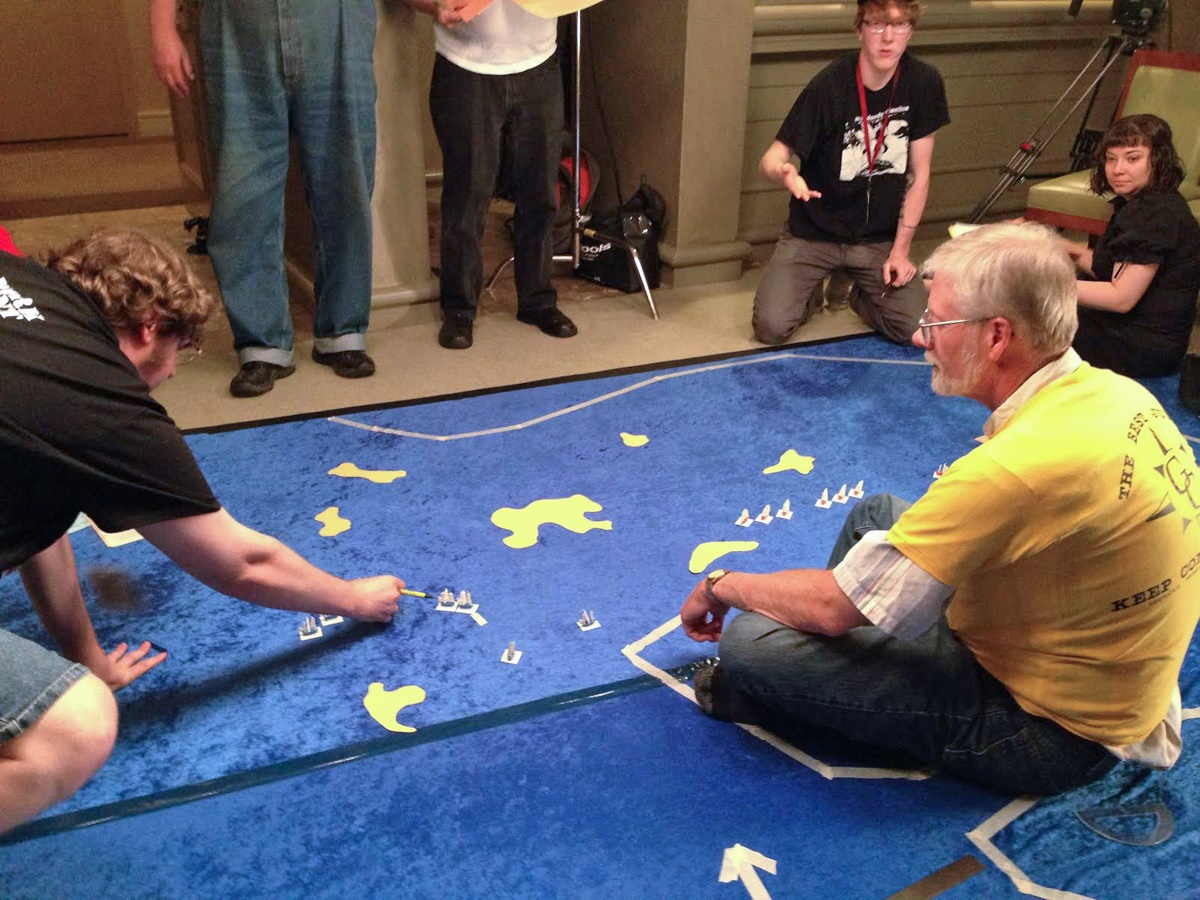
- Mike Carr (in yellow) running Don't Give Up the Ship! at Gen Con Indy 2013.
- Born: September 4, 1951 (age 74); Minneapolis, Minnesota, United States
- Occupations: Writer; editor; game designer
- Writing career
- Period: 1968– 1983
- Genres: Role-playing games, fantasy, wargames

Mike Carr (born September 4, 1951) is a writer and game designer.

== Career ==
=== Early years ===
While still a teenager living in Saint Paul in 1968, Carr created a game called Fight in the Skies (also known as Dawn Patrol). He was invited to present and referee the game at the very first Gen Con convention in Lake Geneva, Wisconsin, but had to convince his parents to drive him to Lake Geneva for the weekend. While at Gen Con, he met the convention's organizer, Gary Gygax, and quickly became an acquaintance. Three years later, he co-authored Don't Give Up The Ship! with Gygax and Dave Arneson. Carr began wargaming with the International Federation of Wargamers as a teenager. After high school, Carr completed a Bachelor of Arts degree in history from Macalester College before going on to work as a restaurant manager with Ground Round in the mid-1970s.

=== TSR and Dungeons & Dragons ===
In 1976, at the invitation of Gygax, he joined TSR, Inc., and wrote an introductory Dungeons & Dragons module called In Search of the Unknown in 1979. Since it was included with the Dungeons & Dragons introductory box set, the module enjoyed a sizeable print run. Carr also served as the editor of the three central rulebooks for the more complex Advanced Dungeons & Dragons: Monster Manual, Dungeon Masters Guide and Players Handbook, and he also wrote the foreword that appeared in the early editions of each of them. He also edited Vault of the Drow (1978), White Plume Mountain (1979), The Village of Hommlet (1979), The World of Greyhawk (1980), The Keep on the Borderlands (1981), Descent into the Depths of the Earth (1981), Against the Giants (1981), and Deep Dwarven Delve (not printed until 1999). He additionally co-edited (with Tom Wham, Timothy Jones, and Brian Blume) the first edition of Gamma World. In the early 1980s Carr also authored three children's books which were published by TSR, including one in the Endless Quest series entitled "Robbers & Robots".

Jon Peterson, for Polygon, highlighted that Arneson's 1977 lawsuit over Basic Set royalties led to the creation of Carr's In Search of the Unknown module which showed that "a module like this [...] could bring significant income to its author". "As Arneson's lawsuit loomed, TSR made a very pointed substitution to the contents of the Basic Set" by swapping in Carr's In Search of the Unknown module. Peterson wrote, "it was a good idea to target a module at beginning dungeon masters — but it also had clear implications for the legal situation. Previously, when Arneson sought a 5% royalty on the whole contents of the Basic Set, he was effectively asking for money that was going into Gygax's pocket. Now, he would instead be asking for money earmarked for his friend Mike Carr". Carr received royalties for In Search of the Unknown when the module was sold alone and when it was included in the Basic Set. After the September 1979 disappearance of James Dallas Egbert III, Dungeons & Dragons received "mainstream notoriety. And with that, sales of the Basic Set rose dramatically. Right before the steam tunnel incident, the Basic Set might have sold 5,000 copies a month. By the end of 1979, it was trading over 30,000 copies per month, and only going up from there". Following Carr's financial success due to his module being included in the boxed set, Gygax changed the module included with the Basic Set to Keep on the Borderlands which was a module he wrote.

=== After TSR ===
Carr left TSR in 1983. That year, he was recruited by the noted Chicago commodities trader Richard Dennis for training as one of the original "Turtle Traders," gaining expertise in technical trend trading before being let go with the rest of the class of recruits as the firm retrenched after losses in 1988. Later, Carr spent time as a futures trader, an investment manager, manager of a marketing firm, a marketing consultant and most recently as a freelance writer, authoring snowmobile travel articles for several magazines. He is also involved in the production of Aerodrome, a fanzine founded by Carr in 1969 for devotees of the Dawn Patrol game.

Carr was honored in 2007 as the only person who had attended every Gen Con convention since 1968. His Fight in the Skies game was also the only one that had been played at every Gen Con.
