= Brian Blume =

American game designer and writer (1950–2020)

Brian John Blume
- Born: January 12, 1950; Oak Park, Illinois, U.S.
- Died: March 27, 2020 (aged 70); Elkhorn, Wisconsin, U.S.
- Occupations: Writer, game designer
- Spouse: Victoria Miller
- Writing career
- Genres: Role-playing games, fantasy, wargames

Brian John Blume (January 12, 1950 – March 27, 2020) was an American game designer and writer, principally known as a former business partner of Gary Gygax at TSR, Inc., original publishers of the fantasy role-playing game Dungeons & Dragons.

== Biography ==
=== Early life ===
Brian Blume was born January 12, 1950, in Oak Park, Illinois, to Melvin and Kathleen Blume, and grew up in Wauconda, Illinois, with four brothers and three half-brothers. Blume began playing chess at age seven, and the tabletop wargame Gettysburg at age nine.

He was fascinated by history in junior high school and was involved in miniature wargaming in high school. After graduating as class valedictorian, Blume attended Wabash College, but left to become a tool and die making journeyman for his father's company for five years.

=== Dungeons & Dragons and TSR ===
Blume met Gary Gygax at the Gen Con game convention in Lake Geneva, Wisconsin. Gygax and his friend Don Kaye had recently formed Tactical Studies Rules in Lake Geneva in order to publish a new type of game that Gygax and Dave Arneson had developed, Dungeons & Dragons. Gygax and Kaye had each invested $1,000 into the venture but still did not have enough money to print the game. In December 1973, Blume offered to become an equal partner in the company for an investment of $2,000. Using Blume's money, the three partners printed a thousand copies of the new game and sold their first copy in January 1974. Blume and Gygax also co-authored the Warriors of Mars miniatures wargame adaptation. Before the end of 1974, the first printing of D&D had sold out, and demand for the game was skyrocketing.

Just as the young company was gearing up to meet demand, unexpected disaster struck. Don Kaye, although only 36, suddenly died of a heart attack. Kaye had not made any specific provision in his will regarding his one-third share of the company, so his share of TSR passed to his wife Donna. In July 1975, Gygax and Blume reorganized their company from a partnership to a corporation called TSR Hobbies, with Gygax as president. Gygax owned 150 shares, Blume owned the other 100 shares, and both had the option to buy up to 700 shares at any time in the future. But TSR Hobbies had nothing to publish — D&D was still owned by the three-way partnership of Tactical Studies Rules, and neither Gygax nor Blume had the money to buy out the share owned by Donna Kaye. Blume persuaded a reluctant Gygax to allow his father, Melvin Blume, to buy Donna's share, and that was converted to 200 shares in TSR Hobbies. In addition, Brian bought another 140 shares. The Blumes and Gygax formed the company's three-person board.

Shortly afterward, Blume received a blind mailing of the first issue of the monthly newsletter Owl and Weasel from Games Workshop, which had been recently formed by Ian Livingstone and Steve Jackson. In return, Blume sent them a copy of Dungeons & Dragons. Livingstone and Jackson considered this game more imaginative than any contemporary UK games, so they worked out an exclusive three-year arrangement with Blume to sell D&D in the European market.

As various new rules and products for D&D were created, Blume provided material for The Rogues Gallery, and co-authored the Dungeons & Dragons supplement Eldritch Wizardry with Gygax in 1976, naming the character Vecna as an anagram of Jack Vance. Blume and Gygax also co-authored the Boot Hill role-playing game as a tribute to Don Kaye, who had been a fan of Westerns. In addition, he co-edited (with Tom Wham, Timothy Jones, and Mike Carr) the first edition of Gamma World. Blume also authored the Panzer Warfare miniatures wargame in 1975.

=== Power struggle within TSR ===
Brian met Victoria Miller and married her in 1980.

At about the same time, Blume persuaded Gygax to allow Blume's brother Kevin to purchase Melvin Blume's 200 shares. By 1981, the Blume brothers had become increasingly unhappy regarding the conservative approach Gygax took with the business, so they leveraged their greater stock ownership to effectively take control by splitting TSR Hobbies into TSR, Inc., and TSR Entertainment, Inc. While Kevin Blume became president of TSR, Inc., Gygax was made president of TSR Entertainment, Inc., and the Blumes sent him to Hollywood to develop opportunities for TV and movie projects.

Bank creditors insisted on the appointment of three independent directors with business experience, so the Blumes added three outside directors from the American Management Association – a lawyer employed with a large firm in Milwaukee, a personnel officer who worked at a company in the Milwaukee area, and the owner of a company that manufactured medical equipment – to enlarge the Board of Directors to six people. None of the new directors were familiar the gaming industry, and they always voted with Brian and Kevin Blume.

With Gygax gone, the Blumes were free to move TSR Inc. into new directions. After TSR acquired SPI in March 1982, the Blumes declared that they had only "bought assets but not liabilities". Actually, SPI owed money to their printers, who would not release the plates used for printing the SPI games until TSR repaid the bills that SPI left. On a more successful note, the Blumes moved into the book trade with popular series such as Endless Quest. The Blumes also moved TSR into toy manufacturing, metal miniatures, and even needlecraft. In the company's main business of role-playing games, the Blumes oversaw the creation of the new role-playing lines Dragonlance and Marvel Super Heroes. However, all of these new ventures were expensive, and by 1984, although TSR Inc. was the games industry leader, grossing $30 million, it was barely breaking even and had debts of $1.5 million. The Blume brothers began to shop around for someone to buy the company.

When Gygax heard that TSR was being shopped around, he returned to Lake Geneva. After some investigation of the company finances, Gygax charged that the financial crisis was due to mismanagement by Kevin Blume: excess inventory, overstaffing, too many company cars, and some questionable (and expensive) projects such as dredging up a 19th-century shipwreck. Gygax persuaded the board of directors to remove Kevin Blume as president. Brian Blume abstained from the final vote, which went 4–1 in favor of removing Kevin. However, the outside directors still believed the company's financial problems were terminal and the company needed to be sold. In an effort to prevent this, in March 1985 Gygax exercised his 700-share stock option, giving him just over 50% control. He appointed himself president and CEO, and in order to bring some financial stability to TSR, he hired a company manager, Lorraine Williams, who dismissed the three outside directors. Bringing Williams on board backfired for Gygax when in October 1985, Brian Blume revealed that he had triggered his own 560-share option, and then he and his brother Kevin had sold all their shares to Williams, leaving her as the majority shareholder. Gygax took TSR to court in a bid to block the Blumes' sale of their shares to Williams, but he lost, and Williams replaced Gygax as president and CEO.

Having sold all his company shares, Brian Blume stepped down from the board of directors and left TSR.

=== Subsequent game work ===
Blume later worked as a cartographer, making maps for numerous White Wolf supplements.

=== Later life ===
Blume died on March 27, 2020, at the Lakeland Nursing Home in Elkhorn, Wisconsin from Lewy Body Dementia and Parkinson's disease.
