= Tom Moldvay =

American role-playing game designer

Thomas Steven Moldvay
- Born: November 5, 1948
- Died: March 9, 2007 (aged 58)

Thomas Steven Moldvay (November 5, 1948 – March 9, 2007) was an American game designer and author, best known for his work on early materials for the fantasy role-playing game Dungeons & Dragons (D&D).

== Career ==
During the 1970s while a student at Kent State University in Ohio, Moldvay was a writer for the science fiction fanzine Infinite Dreams.

Moldvay was a Dungeons & Dragons player brought into TSR by the head of design and development, Lawrence Schick, during a time of substantial growth at TSR. After the publication of the core handbooks for Advanced Dungeons & Dragons, Moldvay wrote a second edition of the Dungeons & Dragons Basic Set (1980). As an employee of TSR, Moldvay authored or co-authored landmark D&D adventure modules such as Castle Amber, Isle of Dread, the rewrite of Palace of the Silver Princess, and Secret of the Slavers Stockade, all published in 1981. Of these, X1 – Isle of Dread was one of the most widely played modules of the time because it was distributed inside the D&D Expert Set rules.

Other Moldvay adventure modules for D&D include The Lost City (1982) and Twilight Calling (1986). In the years between 1980 and 1988, he also penned several articles in Dragon magazine. The fictional city of Yavdlom in the D&D Mystara setting – which in the following years included many locations featured in old D&D material – is an homage to him (Yavdlom being the backward reading of Moldvay). Moldvay also co-developed TSR's Gangbusters role-playing game and wrote adventures for TSR's Star Frontiers game.

Moldvay developed Lords of Creation, a role-playing game published by Avalon Hill. In 1985 he created the one-shot game "The Future King" based on Arthurian legend. In 1986 he created The Challenges Game System, essentially a streamlining of the AD&D players handbook down to 8 pages, and the single adventure published for the system, "Seren Ironhand."

Tom Moldvay died at the age of 58 on March 9, 2007. After Moldvay's death in 2007, Steve Winter called Isle of Dread "Tom's work that had the widest impact", as its inclusion in the Expert Set "made it one of the most widely known and played adventures for years".

== Resources ==
- "Tom Moldvay :: Pen & Paper RPG Database". Archived from the original on March 10, 2005.
- Dragonsfoot Tom Moldvay Bibliography
