= Dungeon Master =

Game referee in Dungeons & Dragons

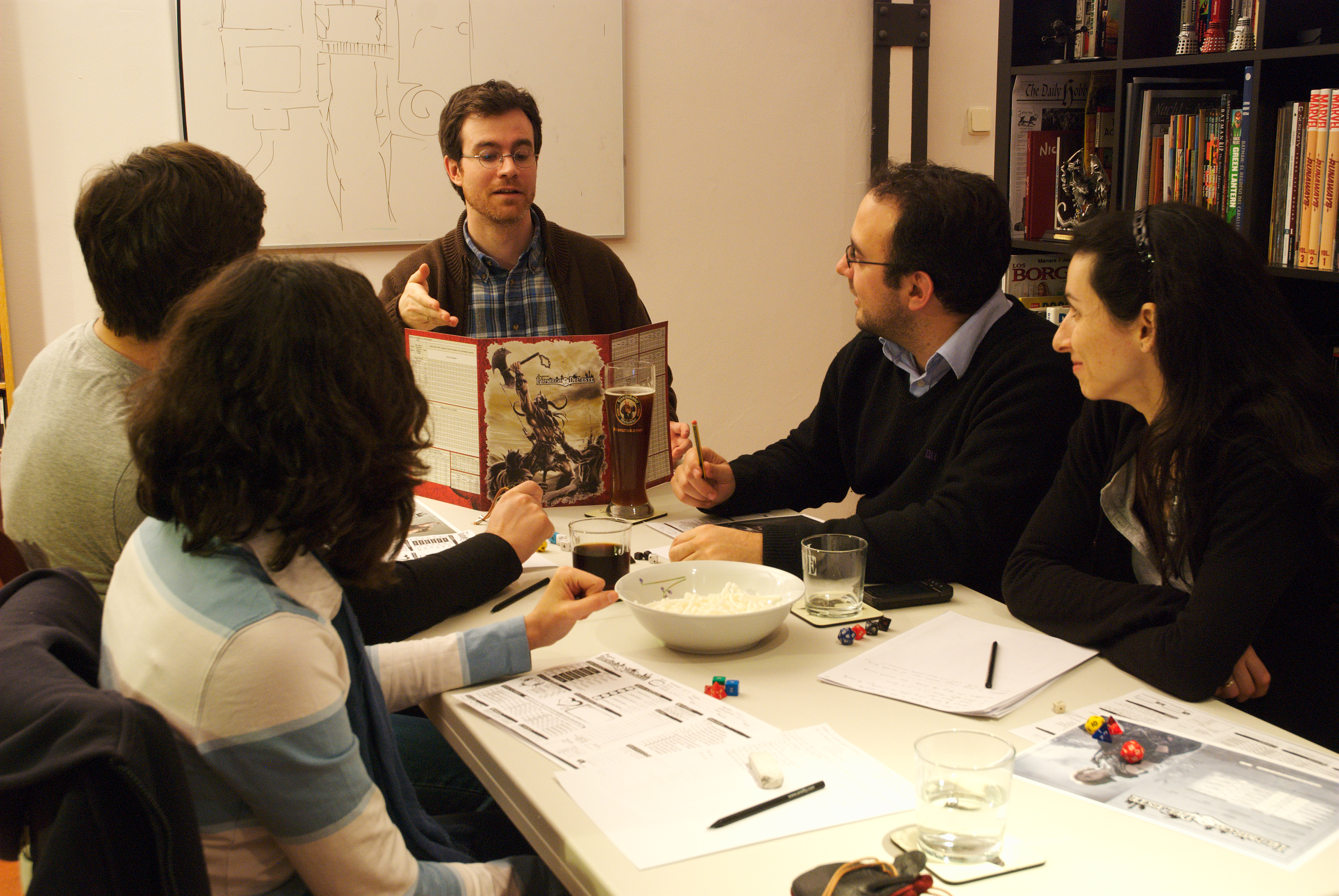
A Dungeon Master, using a gamemaster's screen, explaining a scenario to the players.

In the Dungeons & Dragons (D&D) role-playing game, the Dungeon Master (DM) is the game organizer and participant in charge of creating the details and challenges of a given adventure, while maintaining a realistic continuity of events. In effect, the Dungeon Master controls all aspects of the game, except for the actions of the player characters (PCs), and describes to the players what their characters experience. Regular Dungeons & Dragons groups consist of a Dungeon Master and several players.

The title was invented by Tactical Studies Rules (TSR) for the Dungeons & Dragons RPG, and was introduced in the second supplement to the game rules (Blackmoor) in 1975.

To avoid infringement of trademarks by the publishers of Dungeons & Dragons, and to describe referees in role-playing genres other than sword and sorcery, other gaming companies use more generic terms, like Game Master (GM), Game Operations Director (a backronym of GOD), Judge, Referee or Storyteller. Some use more esoteric titles related to the genre or style of the game, such as the "Keeper of Arcane Lore" from Call of Cthulhu and the "Hollyhock God" from Nobilis.

== Role ==
The Dungeon Master (DM) assumes the role of the game master or referee and describes for other players what they perceive in the imaginary world of the game, and what effects their actions have. That person is responsible for preparing each game session, and must have a thorough understanding of the game rules. Since the inception of the Advanced Dungeons & Dragons system in 1977, these rules have been contained in three hardbound books: the Player's Handbook, Dungeon Master's Guide, and Monster Manual. Many other rulebooks exist as well, but these are not required for conducting the game.

The DM is responsible for narrative flow, creating the scenario and setting in which the game takes place, maintaining the pace and providing dynamic feedback. In storyteller role, the DM is responsible for describing the events of the D&D game session and making rulings about game situations and effects based on the decisions made by the players. The DM can develop the adventure plot and setting in which these PCs participate or use a preexisting module. This is typically designed as a type of decision tree that is followed by the players, and a customized version can require several hours of preparation for each hour spent playing the game.

The DM serves as the arbiter of the rules, both in teaching the rules to the players and in enforcing them. The rules provide game mechanics for resolving the outcome of events, including how the player's characters interact with the game world. Although the rules exist to provide a balanced game environment, the DM is free to ignore the rules as needed. The DM can modify, remove, or create entirely new rules in order to fit the rules to the current campaign. This includes situations where the rules do not readily apply, making it necessary to improvise. An example would be if the PCs are attacked by a living statue. To destroy the enemy, one PC soaks the statue in water, while the second uses his cone of cold breath to freeze the water. At this point, he appeals to the DM, saying the water expands as it freezes and shatters the statue. The DM might allow it, or roll dice to decide. In the above example the probability roll might come up in favor of the players, and the enemy would be shattered. Conversely, rules do not fit all eventualities and may have unintended consequences. The DM must ultimately draw the line between the creative utilization of resources (e.g. firing wooden arrows into a dragon, then using a spell that warps wood at a distance) and an exploit (e.g. "horse bombing" - using a non-combat spell that creates a temporary mount, several dozen feet above an enemy).

== In fiction ==
In the Faiths and Pantheons Dungeons & Dragons sourcebook, the Faerunian Overgod Ao answers to a superior entity, insinuated to be the "Dungeon Master".
