= Dungeons & Dragons Basic Set =

Boxed set for tabletop role-playing game Dungeons & Dragons

Dungeons & Dragons
- Dungeons & Dragons 1977 Basic Set box cover
- Author: Based on the work of Gary Gygax and Dave Arneson; J. Eric Holmes (1977 version); Tom Moldvay (1981 version); Frank Mentzer (1983 version); Troy Denning (1991 version); Doug Stewart (1994 version)
- Genre: Role-playing game
- Publisher: TSR, Inc.
- Publication date: 1977, 1981, 1983, 1991, 1994
- Media type: Boxed set

The Dungeons & Dragons Basic Set is a set of rulebooks for the Dungeons & Dragons (D&D) fantasy role-playing game. First published in 1977, it saw a handful of revisions and reprintings. The first edition was written by J. Eric Holmes based on Gary Gygax and Dave Arneson's original work. Later editions were edited by Tom Moldvay, Frank Mentzer, Troy Denning, and Doug Stewart.

The Basic Set details the essential concepts of the D&D game. It provides the rules for character creation and advancement for player characters at beginning levels. It also includes information on how to play adventures inside dungeons for both players and the Dungeon Master.

== 1977 version ==
The original Dungeons & Dragons Basic Set was published by TSR, Inc. in 1977.

TSR hired outside writer John Eric Holmes to produce the Basic Set as an introductory version of the D&D game. It incorporates game concepts from the original 1974 D&D boxed set plus Supplement I: Greyhawk. The rulebook is intended for characters of levels one through three, with rules for adventuring in dungeons, and introduces the main concepts of the game; it explains the game's concepts and method of play in terms that make them accessible to new players ages twelve and older who might not be familiar with the rules and structure of tabletop miniatures wargaming. Although the Basic Set was not fully compatible with Advanced Dungeons & Dragons, players were expected to continue play beyond third level by moving to AD&D, which was released beginning later that year. Holmes preferred a lighter tone with more room for personal improvisation, while Gary Gygax, who wrote the Advanced books, wanted an expansive game with rulings on any conceivable situation which might come up during play, and so could be used to arbitrate disputes at tournaments.

The first Basic Set was available as a 48-page standalone rulebook featuring artwork by David C. Sutherland III, or as part of a boxed set, which was packaged in a larger, more visually appealing box than the original boxed set, allowing the game to be stocked on retail shelves and targeted at the general public via toy stores. The boxed set included a set of polyhedral dice and supplemental materials. In that same year, Games Workshop (U.K.) published their own version of the rulebook, with a cover by John Blanche, and illustrations by Fangorn. The boxed set contained geomorphs, lists of monsters and treasures, and a polyhedral dice set as supplemental materials.

For a period in 1979, TSR experienced a dice shortage. Basic sets published during this time frame came with two sheets of numbered cutout cardstock chits that functioned in lieu of dice, along with a coupon for ordering dice from TSR. The rulebook also included a brief sample dungeon with a full-page map. Starting with the fourth printing in 1978, the two booklets of maps, encounter tables, and treasure lists were replaced with the module B1 In Search of the Unknown; printings six through eleven (1979–1982) featured the module B2 The Keep on the Borderlands instead.

Jon Peterson, for Polygon, highlighted that Dave Arneson sued TSR over Basic Set royalties in 1977 – Arneson was only being paid royalties for the Basic D&D rulebook included in the boxed set and was not paid for the "cover price of the whole Basic Set". Peterson wrote "as Arneson's lawsuit loomed, TSR made a very pointed substitution to the contents of the Basic Set: they rotated out the Dungeon Geomorphs and Monster & Treasure Assortment booklets, replacing them with Mike Carr's In Search of the Unknown module. [...] It was a good idea to target a module at beginning dungeon masters — but it also had clear implications for the legal situation. Previously, when Arneson sought a 5% royalty on the whole contents of the Basic Set, he was effectively asking for money that was going into Gygax's pocket. Now, he would instead be asking for money earmarked for his friend Mike Carr". Carr received royalties for In Search of the Unknown when the module was sold alone and when it was included in the Basic Set. After the September 1979 disappearance of James Dallas Egbert III, Dungeons & Dragons received "mainstream notoriety. And with that, sales of the Basic Set rose dramatically. Right before the steam tunnel incident, the Basic Set might have sold 5,000 copies a month. By the end of 1979, it was trading over 30,000 copies per month, and only going up from there". Following Carr's financial success due to his module being included in the boxed set, Gygax changed the module included with the Basic Set to Keep on the Borderlands which was a module he wrote.

== 1981 revision ==
After the release of the AD&D game, the Basic Set saw a major revision in 1981 by editor Tom Moldvay. The game was not brought in line with AD&D but instead further away from that ruleset, and thus the basic D&D game became a separate and distinct product line from AD&D. The former was promoted as continuing the tone of original D&D, while AD&D was an advancement of the mechanics.

The revised version of the set included a larger, sixty-four page rule book with a red border and a color cover by Erol Otus, the adventure B2 The Keep on the Borderlands, a set of six polyhedral dice, as well as a marking crayon. The book came drilled with holes so that it could be used in a three-ringed binder, and the full set of off-white polyhedral dice came in a heat-sealed bag with a small wax crayon for coloring the numbers on the dice. The revised rulebook was visually distinct from the previous version: the Holmes booklet had a monochrome pale blue cover, while the Moldvay rulebook had a bright red cover.

With the revision of the Basic Set, distinct rulesets for higher character levels were introduced as expansions to the basic game. Immediately following the Moldvay version of the Basic Set was the accompanying release of an Expert Set which was edited by Dave Cook with Steve Marsh that supported character levels four through fourteen, with the intent that players would continue with the Expert Set.

Peterson commented that "because Keep on the Borderlands would ship with the Moldvay Basic Set, at the height of the D&D boom in 1981, it became one of the most widely known modules in D&D history, selling 750,000 copies a year. It might never have served as the gateway to adventure for so many players if it hadn't been for a certain legal dispute and its consequences".

== 1983 revision ==
Front cover for Dungeons & Dragons Basic Set 1983

In 1983, the Basic Set was revised again, this time by Frank Mentzer, and redubbed Dungeons & Dragons Set 1: Basic Rules. The set included a sixty-four page Players Manual, a forty-eight page Dungeon Masters Rulebook, six dice, and in sets in which the dice were not painted, a crayon was provided to fill in the indentations in the dice. The 1983 revision was packaged in a distinctive red box, and featured cover art by Larry Elmore. Between 1983 and 1986, the system was revised and expanded by Mentzer as a series of five boxed sets, including the Basic Rules (red cover), Expert Rules (blue), Companion Rules (teal, supporting levels fifteen through twenty-five), Master Rules (black, supporting levels twenty-six through thirty-six), and Immortals Rules (gold, supporting Immortals, characters who had transcended levels). Instead of an adventure module, the Basic Set rulebooks included a solo adventure and an introductory scenario to be run by the Dungeon Master.

The rules for the game were little changed from the Moldvay set, but the presentation was overhauled into a more tutorial form, to make the game easier for younger players to learn.

The 10th Anniversary Dungeons & Dragons Collector's Set boxed set, published by TSR in 1984, included the rulebooks from the Basic, Expert, and Companion sets; modules AC2, AC3, B1, B2, and M1 Blizzard Pass; Player Character Record Sheets; and dice. This set was limited to a thousand copies, and was sold by mail and at GenCon 17.

== 1991 revision ==
In 1991, TSR released a new version of the Basic Set, labeled The New Easy to Master Dungeons & Dragons Game and nicknamed the "black box". This version was principally designed by Troy Denning and made few changes to the game. It included support for characters up to fifth level instead of the third-level limit of prior Basic Set versions.

The rules are presented twice, once in a 64-page rule book, and again in the Dungeon Card Learning Pack, a set of 48 cards that also includes four-page supplementary mini-adventures. Inspired by the SRA reading program, the front of each card features a discussion of a single facet of the rules, such as non-player characters, hit dice, or initiative rolls. The back of the card describes a brief scenario to illustrate the rules discussed on the front. The set also includes a Dungeon Master's Screen which doubles as a folder for the cards, fold-up cardboard pawns, a color map sheet, and dice.

TSR published the Dungeons & Dragons Rules Cyclopedia the same year, compiling and revising the rules from the Basic, Expert, Companion, and Master Rules box sets to allow players to continue beyond the black box.

== 1994 revision ==
A final version of the set entitled The Classic Dungeons & Dragons Game was produced in 1994. Edited by Doug Stewart, it removed the tutorial cards of the "black box", incorporating the material into sidebars within the single 128-page Rules and Adventure Book. The set also included a Dungeon Master's Screen, a set of six plastic miniatures for players, 24 foldable cardboard enemy standees, a poster map, and a set of dice. It was packaged in a tan-sided box.

== Reception ==
In the 1980 book The Complete Book of Wargames, game designer Jon Freeman reviewed the 1977 edition and commented: "Basic Dungeons & Dragons is only a starter set and effectively obsolete a few weeks after you get a campaign going". Having called the original D&D set "the most illiterate display of poor grammar, misspelling, and typographical errors in all of professional wargaming", Freeman was pleased that this edition had been written "by someone outside the TSR establishment who knew a noun from a verb, and the difference shows". Freeman gave this game an Overall Evaluation of "Very Good", concluding: "It's still preferable to participate in an ongoing campaign, but if you must venture into RPG country without a guide, this is the first place to visit".

Clayton Miner reviewed the 1981 version of the Basic Set for Pegasus magazine #1 (1981). Miner commented that "the book is a vast improvement over the earlier version. Better organization and well written rules are the main features of this edition".

Anders Swenson and Douglas Law reviewed the Dungeons & Dragons Basic Set and Dungeons & Dragons Expert Set for Different Worlds magazine and stated that "the new D&D Basic and Expert Sets should be a smooth introduction to the hobby of adventure-game playing for vast numbers of new players and an enjoyable addition to the libraries of experienced players. We recommend this version of the game over the previous editions, especially for beginners, because it is clearer, better organized, and more refined".

Games magazine included Dungeons & Dragons, Basic Set in their "Top 100 Games of 1981", noting that it "is actually a set of books that tell you how to create adventures in a magical fantasy world".

Games magazine included Dungeons & Dragons, Basic Set in their "Top 100 Games of 1982", describing it as "more than a game, it's a cooperative exercise limited only by the players' imaginations. For advanced players there are dozens of excellent supplemental books, adventures, and playing aids".

Doug Cowie reviewed the 1983 version of the Basic Set for Imagine magazine and gave it a positive review. According to Cowie, while the rules stay the same, thus allowing those with the older version to continue using their sets, the presentation has changed. He approved of the fact that "at long last", a game company released a product that explains to someone new to role-playing games how to get started. Cowie ended his review by stating that "Basic is a lot closer to the spirit of the original game than is the rambling, unwieldy and sometimes pompous Advanced" and that "for one-off dungeon type games I would recommend Basic to anyone, beginner and veteran alike".

Ken Rolston reviewed Dungeons & Dragons: Basic Rules Set 1 for Different Worlds magazine and stated that "Is the Basic Rules Set complete? Technically yes - the package contains ample material for many hours of gaming. However, the Expert Rules are really necessary if a regular gaming group develops. Personal observation indicates that young players will go through the set's three character levels in no time at all, and the gamemaster will certainly want access to high er level rules to handle the non-play er character antagonists in his adventures. Nonetheless, this is an excellent introductory package, perfect for youths and casual beginners - good-looking, smooth-reading, right-spirited, and reasonably priced."

In a retrospective review of Dungeons & Dragons Basic Set in Black Gate, Scott Taylor said: "In the 'box' I had it all, the player's book with the classes, the experience charts, and the equipment. The dungeon master's booklet provided the finer points of the rules, the monsters, and the treasure I'd be able to find after hard-fought battle".

Scott Taylor for Black Gate in 2014 listed the Mentzer edition Basic D&D Boxed Set by Larry Elmore as #2 in The Top 10 TSR Cover Paintings of All Time.

== See also ==
- Editions of Dungeons & Dragons
