= Gary Gygax bibliography =

This is a bibliography of American game designer and author Gary Gygax.

== Miniature games, board games and rule variants ==
As of 18 March 2023:

- Alexander the Great (1971)
- Chainmail (1971) with Jeff Perren
- Dunkirk: The Battle of France (1971)
- Tractics (1971) with Mike Reese and Leon Tucker
- Don't Give Up the Ship! (1972) with Dave Arneson and Mike Carr
- Cavaliers and Roundheads (1973) with Jeff Perren
- Warriors of Mars (1974) with Brian Blume
- Classic Warfare (1975)
- Dungeon! (1975) with David R. Megarry, Michael Gray, Steve Winter and S. Schwab
- Little Big Horn: Custer's Last Stand (1976)
- Dragonchess (1985, Dragon Magazine #100)

== Role-playing games ==
- Dungeons & Dragons (1974) with Dave Arneson
- Boot Hill (1975) with Brian Blume and Don Kaye
- Advanced Dungeons & Dragons:
  - Monster Manual (1977)
  - Players Handbook (1978)
  - Dungeon Masters Guide (1979)
- Cyborg Commando (1987) with Frank Mentzer and Kim Mohan
- Gary Gygax's Dangerous Journeys:
  - Mythus (1992)
  - Mythus Prime (1994)
- Lejendary Adventure:
  - The Lejendary Rules for All Players (1999)
  - The Beasts of Lejend (2000)
  - The Lejend Master's Lore (2000)
  - Essentials (2005)

=== Supplements ===
- D&D supplement I: Greyhawk (1975) with Robert Kuntz
- D&D supplement III: Eldritch Wizardry (1976) with Brian Blume
- Dungeon Geomorphs (1976)
- D&D supplement V: Swords & Spells (1976)
- Outdoor Geomorphs (1977)
- World of Greyhawk Fantasy Game Setting (1980)
- AD&D Monster Manual II (1983)
- AC4 The Book of Marvelous Magic (1985) with Frank Mentzer
- AD&D Unearthed Arcana (1985)
- AD&D Oriental Adventures (1985)
- Gary Gygax's Dangerous Journeys:
  - Mythus Magick (1992)
  - The Epic of Aerth (1992)
  - Necropolis and the Land of Aegypt (1992)
  - Mythus Bestiary (1993)
- Lejendary Earth World Setting:
  - Lejendary Earth Gazetteer (2002)
  - Noble Knights and Dark Lands (2003) with Chris Clark
  - The Exotic Realms of Hazgar (2006) with Chris Clark
- d20 System:
  - The Slayer's Guide to Dragons (2002) with Jon Creffield
  - The Slayer's Guide to Undead (2002) with Jon Creffield
- Gygaxian Fantasy Worlds:
  - Gary Gygax's the Canting Crew (2002)
  - Gary Gygax's World Builder (2003)
  - Gary Gygax's Living Fantasy (2003)
- Castles & Crusades:
  - CZ1 Castle Zagyg: Yggsburgh (2005)
  - CZ9 The East Mark Gazetteer (2007) with Jeffrey P. Talanian
  - CZ2 Castle Zagyg: The Upper Works (2008) with Jeffrey P. Talanian

=== Adventure modules ===
- S1 Tomb of Horrors (1975, 1978)
- S3 Expedition to the Barrier Peaks (1976, 1980)
- S4 The Lost Caverns of Tsojcanth (1976, 1982)
- G1 Steading of the Hill Giant Chief (1978)
- G2 Glacial Rift of the Frost Giant Jarl (1978)
- G3 Hall of the Fire Giant King (1978)
- D1 Descent into the Depths of the Earth (1978)
- D2 Shrine of the Kuo-Toa (1978)
- D3 Vault of the Drow (1978)
- Q1 Queen of the Demonweb Pits (1978)
- T1 Village of Hommlet (1979)
- B2 The Keep on the Borderlands (1979)
- GW1 Legion of Gold (1980) Gamma World adventure module, with Luke Gygax and Paul Reiche III
- WG4 The Forgotten Temple of Tharizdun (1982)
- EX1 Dungeonland (1983)
- EX2 The Land Beyond the Magic Mirror (1983)
- WG5 Mordenkainen's Fantastic Adventure (1984) with Robert Kuntz
- WG6 Isle of the Ape (1985)
- T1-4 The Temple of Elemental Evil (1985) with Frank Mentzer
- GDQ1-7 Queen of the Spiders (1986)
- Pulp Dungeons: Uninvited Guests (1997) with Lester Smith and Bryan Winter
- A Challenge of Arms - the Wolfmoon Adventure Module #1 (1998) with Christopher Clark
- The Ritual of the Golden Eyes - the Wolfmoon Adventure Module #2 (1998) with Christopher Clark
- d20 Sword & Sorcery: Gary Gygax's Necropolis (2002)
- d20 system: Gary Gygax's the Hermit (2002)
- Lejendary Adventure - Terekaptra: Lost City of the Utiss (2004)
- d20 system: Gary Gygax's Hall of Many Panes (2005)
- Lejendary Adventure - Living the Legend (2006)

== Other role-playing game related subjects ==
- The Official Advanced Dungeons & Dragons Coloring Album (1979)
- Hero's Challenge - Sagard the Barbarian gamebook:
  - The Ice Dragon (1985) with Flint Dille
  - The Green Hydra (1985) with Flint Dille
  - The Crimson Sea (1985) with Flint Dille
  - The Fire Demon (1986) with Flint Dille
- Role-Playing Mastery (1987)
- Master of the Game (1989)
- The Weyland Smith & Company Giant Fun Catalog (1999)
- Horsemen of the Apocalypse: Essays on Roleplaying (2000)
  - with Jim Dietz, Richard Garfield, Greg Costikyan, Marc Miller, Matt Forbeck, Greg Stafford and Rick Loomis

== Novels ==
- Greyhawk Adventure/Gord the Rogue series:
  - Saga of Old City (1985)
  - Artifact of Evil (1986)
  - Sea of Death (1987)
  - Night Arrant (1987, short stories)
  - City of Hawks (1987)
  - Come Endless Darkness (1988)
  - Dance of Demons (1988)
- Dangerous Journeys novels:
  - The Anubis Murders (1992)
  - The Samarkand Solution (1993)
  - Death in Delhi (1993)
  - Infernal Sorceress (2008)
