= Lorraine Williams =

American businessperson

- Born: Lorraine Dille Williams
- Occupation: Businessperson
- Known for: Manager of TSR, Inc., 1986-1997

Lorraine Dille Williams is an American businesswoman. She was hired as manager of TSR, Inc. by company co-founder Gary Gygax in 1984, and was in charge of the table game company from 1986 to 1997. Williams gained control of TSR in October 1985 when the Blume brothers sold her their controlling shares of the company. In 1996, an unexpectedly high cost of returned (unsold) fiction books and an expensive, unsuccessful foray into the collectible card game market caused a cash flow squeeze, and Williams sold TSR to Wizards of the Coast in 1997.

Williams inherited the rights to Buck Rogers and a large collection of Buck Rogers memorabilia. She sold the memorabilia at auction in 2010.

== Early life ==
Lorraine Williams is the granddaughter of John F. Dille who, while president of the National Newspaper Service syndicate in the 1920s, arranged for Buck Rogers to be turned into a syndicated comic strip. After Dille's death in 1957, ownership of Buck Rogers and other works passed into the Dille Family Trust through the Dille family trust, making Williams one of the beneficiaries of the Buck Rogers franchise. The Dille family retained the licensing of Buck Rogers, as well as a collection of Buck Rogers memorabilia that John F. Dille had accumulated over thirty years. Game designer, screenwriter, and novelist Flint Dille is her brother.

Williams attended the University of California at Berkeley, where she earned a B.A. in history. After graduating, she worked at the National Newspaper Syndicate. She then became an assistant administrator at the Rush-Presbyterian-St. Luke's Medical Center. Later, she joined the National Easter Seal Society, where she worked as an administrator.

== TSR ==
=== Brought into TSR by Gary Gygax ===
Gary Gygax, co-inventor of the role-playing game Dungeons & Dragons and partner in the company TSR, had been sent to Hollywood in 1982 to work on licensing the Dungeons & Dragons brand, leaving fellow board members of TSR, Kevin and Brian Blume to run the day-to-day operations of the company. While in Hollywood, he was involved in the making of the Dungeons & Dragons animated television show and exploring the possibility of a Dungeons & Dragons film adaptation. During the course of his work, Gygax met Flint Dille, and they worked together on a series of gamebook-type novels and a script for an unmade Dungeons & Dragons film. In 1984, Gygax was alerted to the fact that TSR was in debt for $1.5 million and the Blumes were looking for a buyer. In an attempt to bring new investment money into the company, Gygax asked Flint Dille to arrange a meeting with his sister, Lorraine Williams.

Although Williams turned down Gygax's invitation to invest money in TSR, Gygax did hire her, on the basis of her management experience, to manage TSR. Williams successfully worked with creditors of TSR to get money coming back into the company again. Gygax subsequently engineered the removal of Kevin Blume as CEO due to fiscal mismanagement. However, Kevin's brother Brian had a longstanding stock option which he triggered; both brothers then sold their stock to Williams, making her the majority shareholder. Gygax considered firing Williams in order to replace her with his future wife, Gail Carpenter, but was advised against this. Gygax did go to court to have the sale of stock declared illegal, claiming he had a verbal agreement with the Blume brothers to buy their stock. When the judge ruled against him, Gygax sold what remained of his stock and left TSR.

=== In control of TSR ===
Williams worked as a financial planner and she saw the potential to make the company highly profitable. While Williams sought to improve TSR's financial stability, Gary Gygax claimed she viewed gamers with contempt and considered herself socially above them. Former TSR employee Mike Breault has stated that he does not recall a rumored ban by Williams on playing games in the company during his time in TSR, but does go on to say that the vast majority of the products were not playtested.

Upon leaving TSR, Gygax had founded New Infinities Productions, Inc., and subsequently developed a new fantasy role-playing game, spanning multiple genres, called Dangerous Journeys. When the product was released by Game Designers' Workshop, Williams immediately sued, claiming that the game infringed upon intellectual property that TSR owned. The suit was eventually settled out of court, with TSR buying the complete rights to the Dangerous Journeys system from New Infinities and then permanently shelving the entire project. With no product to sell, Gygax's new company was driven out of business.

Under Williams's direction, TSR initially maintained its leadership position in role-playing games, and expanded further into additional fields, including magazines, as well as paperback fiction, and even comic books. Williams held the rights personally to Buck Rogers through her family, and she encouraged TSR to publish games and novels based on the Buck Rogers license. In 1988 she edited Buck Rogers: The First 60 Years in the 25th Century. TSR also published a Buck Rogers board game, a Buck Rogers XXVC role-playing game based on the rules for AD&D 2nd Edition, over a dozen supplements for the role-playing game, comic books (1990–1991), a line of 11 novels and graphic novels (1989–1993), and two computer games produced by SSI (1990–1992). The family of Lorraine Williams owned Buck Rogers, so TSR paid royalties to the family for their use of the character.

=== Downfall of TSR ===
During the 1980s, TSR was the top games company in North America. However, in the early 1990s, TSR fell behind both Games Workshop and Wizards of the Coast in terms of sales volume. Seeing the profits being generated by Wizards of the Coast with their collectible card game Magic: The Gathering, TSR attempted to enter this market in 1994 in with Spellfire: Master the Magic (followed by Dragon Dice). In addition, despite a history of publishing only one or two hardcover novels each year, TSR also decided to publish twelve novels in 1996.

Sales of Dragon Dice through the games trade started strongly, so TSR quickly produced several expansion packs. In addition, TSR tried to aggressively market Dragon Dice in mass-market book stores through Random House. However, Dragon Dice did not catch on through the book trade, and sales of the expansion sets through traditional games stores sold poorly. In addition, the twelve hardcover novels did not sell as well as expected. Despite total sales of $40 million, TSR ended 1996 with few cash reserves. When Random House returned an unexpectedly high percentage of the year's inventory of unsold novels and Dragon Dice for a fee of several million dollars, TSR found itself in a cash crunch.

With no cash available, TSR was unable to pay their printing and shipping bills, and the logistics company that handled TSR's pre-press, printing, warehousing, and shipping refused to do any more work. Since the logistics company had the production plates for key products such as core D&D books, there was no means of printing or shipping core products in order to generate income or secure short-term financing.

Bob Abramowitz of Five Rings Publishing Group met with Williams and he was able to negotiate with her to secure an option for the purchase of TSR, using funding from Wizards of the Coast. With no viable financial plan for TSR's survival, Williams sold the company to Wizards of the Coast in 1997.

== Auction of Buck Rogers collection ==
In August 2010, Williams announced that she was selling what she described as the world's largest collection of Buck Rogers original comic art, prototypes, toys, books, and collectibles. This was material she had helped her father to catalog and pack up many years before. She said at the time of the announcement that her instinct had been to hold on to everything, but she had come to realize that it was more important to get the collection out into the public. The pieces of the collection were subsequently sold at auction on August 28, 2010.

== Buck Rogers lawsuit ==
In 2017, Williams advanced $250,000 to fund a trademark lawsuit between the Dille Family Trust and the Nowlan Family Trust (who represented the estate of Philip Francis Nowlan, the creator of "Buck Rogers") over who owned the rights to the "Buck Rogers" character. In February 2019 the Dille Family Trust (DFT) entered into a Settlement Agreement with the Nowlan Family Trust selling the Trust's assets and assigning all their intellectual property rights to Buck Rogers to the Nowlan Family Trust; US District Court for the Eastern District of Pennsylvania Civil Action NO 15-6231 case dismissed with prejudice on March 4, 2019.
