= Luke Gygax =

American game designer

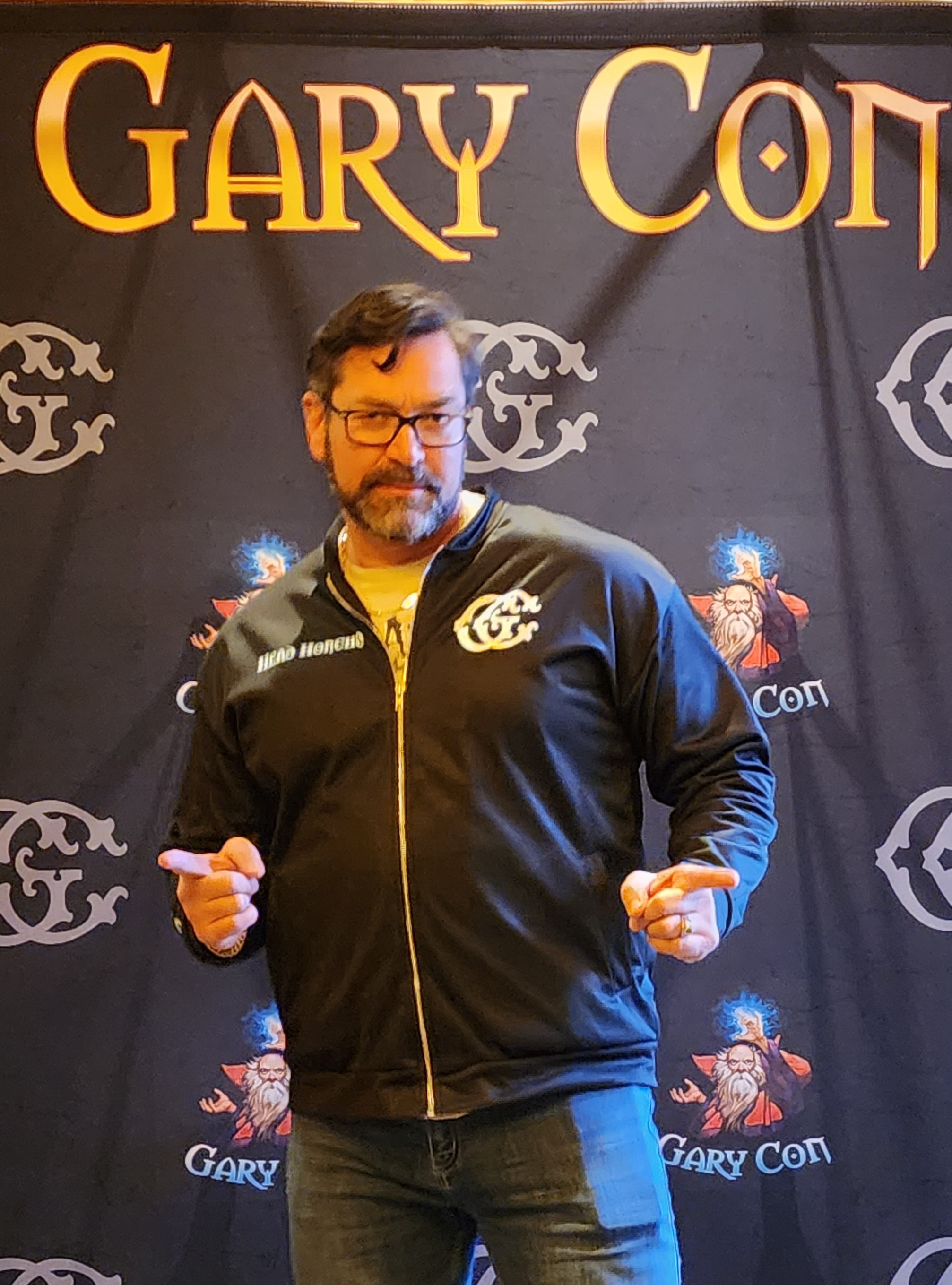
- Gygax in 2023
- Born: Lucion Gygax Lake Geneva, Wisconsin
- Spouse: Bouchra
- Children: 3
- Relatives: Gary Gygax (father)

Luke Gygax is an American game designer, and entrepreneur in the tabletop fantasy and dieselpunk genres. He is best known as the son of Gary Gygax (the co-founder of Dungeons & Dragons and the founder of Gen Con) and for founding the annual Gary Con gaming convention, named after his late father.

== Early life and education ==
Luke Gygax was born Lucion Gygax, in Lake Geneva, Wisconsin (referred to as the birthplace of Dungeons & Dragons), to Gary Gygax and Mary Jo Powell. He has one brother and three sisters.

Gygax served in the U.S. Army for over 33 years, having enlisted at the age of 18. He held positions in the Army Reserves and National Guard.

== Gaming industry career ==
As the son of Gary Gygax (the co-founder of Dungeons & Dragons and the founder of Gen Con), Luke Gygax "grew up at the gaming table with the designers that built the foundation of the RPG industry".

Gygax created several adventures including the world of Okkorim based on inspiration from his military service in Iraq and visits to Morocco, where he met his wife Bouchra, The Fate of Chentoufi (whose Kickstarter raised almost $22,000 in its first three days), and the Oculus of Senrahbah series (a fifth edition Dungeons & Dragons adventure series set in the world of Okkorim).

Gygax created the publishing company Gaxx Worx and founded Gary Con, an annual gaming convention held in Lake Geneva, Wisconsin, in 2009 in honor of Gary Gygax.

Gygax is set to launch the "Strange & Grim" RPG setting with Matt Everhart and Castle Zagyg with Troll Lord Games. Gygax is not involved with the new TSR Games.

=== Castle Zagyg ===
Luke Gygax teamed up with Stephen Chenault, CEO of Troll Lord Games to continue to develop and publish Castle Zagyg, roughly 750 pages divided among three books, a game that his late father Gary Gygax had been working on with Chenault for several years prior to the senior Gygax's death in 2008. The game is based on Gary Gygax's original homegrown campaign and dungeon setting including hand-drawn maps and notes.

After the passing of Gary Gygax, the license for the game was removed or suspended from Troll Lord Games. After legal actions and probate, Troll Lord Games and the Gygax family reached an agreement to work together to finish the project. The project will be released to the public as a boxed set.

== Publications ==
- Gygax co-authored The Eye of Chentoufi and The Heart of Chentoufi with Matt Everhart.
- Gygax co-authored the roleplaying modules Legion of Gold and The Lost City of Gaxmoor.
- Gygax co-authored the roleplaying adventure Madness at Geneva Lake with Alyssa Faden.
