= Dangerous Journeys: Mythus =

- Cover of Mythus
- Designers: Gary Gygax
- Publishers: Game Designers' Workshop
- Publication: 1992
- Genres: Fantasy

Dangerous Journeys: Mythus is a 1992 role-playing supplement for Dangerous Journeys published by Game Designers' Workshop.

== Contents ==
Dangerous Journeys: Mythus is a supplement in which the player characters are called Heroic Personas and are generated by dividing points between the Mental, Physical and Spiritual attributes. The setting for Mythus is the world of Aerth.

== Publication history ==
Shannon Appelcline explained that Gary Gygax wanted to begin publication on Dangerous Journeys in the horror genre, but Game Designers' Workshop (GDW) wanted the system to begin with a fantasy game so Gygax developed Mythus: Dangerous Journeys: Mythus (1992) was soon published. It would be followed by a few supplements and a magazine over the next year" and commented that "Mythus offered an impressive 'first' in GDW's history. After years of science-fiction and near-future games, GDW's first fantasy roleplaying game."

Gygax had originally planned to publish his adventure Necropolis for New Infinites Productions but ultimately published it through GDW as a Mythus adventure in 1992. Gygax also wrote novels for the Mythus setting.

== Reception ==
Robert Hatch reviewed Dangerous Journeys: Mythus in White Wolf #32 (July/Aug., 1992), rating it a 2 out of 5 and stated that "The best example of the priorities of this game system is the fact that the chapter on combat takes up nearly 70 pages, while the chapter on campaigns and successful gamemastering takes up only seven."

== Reviews ==
- Abyss Quarterly #50 (Winter, 1992)
- Australian Realms #8
- The Scroll (Issue 10 - Sep 1992)
- Casus Belli (Issue 72 - Nov 1992)
- Magister (Issue 40 - May 1993)
- The Last Province (Issue 1 - Oct 1992)
- Challenge #63
- Casus Belli (Issue 71 - Sep 1992)
