= Gary Con =

American gaming convention in Wisconsin

Coordinates: 42.363612°N 88.241762°W

- Genre: Gaming
- Venue: Grand Geneva Resort
- Location: Lake Geneva, Wisconsin
- Country: United States
- Inaugurated: March 2009
- Most recent: ongoing
- Attendance: 3000
- Organizer: Luke Gygax
- Website: garycon.com

Gary Con is a gaming convention held in Lake Geneva, Wisconsin every year to celebrate the life and works of Gary Gygax, co-creator of Dungeons & Dragons and who is commonly considered the father of role playing games. Organizers bill the convention "as a more intimate event, reminiscent of the formative years of the gaming industry."

== History ==
Gygax was raised in Lake Geneva, where the company he later founded TSR, Inc.created and produced the Dungeons & Dragons game for 25 years.

When Gary Gygax died in 2008, role playing gamers from around the world joined to honor Gygax's life with a virtual convention, held at locations around the world. Gygax's friends and family held an impromptu game event at Lake Geneva's American Legion Hall following his funeral on March 8, 2008, now known as "Gary Con 0," By 2009, son Luke Gygax established the first official Gary Con, held at the same Legion Hall.

"Gary Con I," held March 7, 2009, was attended by a number of gaming industry icons: Frank Mentzer, Tom Wham, Steve Chenault, and Jim Ward.

By 2010, the Legion Hall no longer had the capacity to host the growing event and its participants. As a result, the event was moved to a local lodge west of the town. The convention moved to the Grand Geneva Resort and Spa in 2016. Convention organizer Luke Gygax told a local paper Gary Con was "...meant to be a more intimate event, reminiscent of the formative years of the gaming industry."

Gary Con was mentioned in the February 26, 2015, episode of the television sitcom The Big Bang Theory, "The Intimacy Acceleration." This reference brought attention to the event, causing its website to nearly crash, and boosting attendance for that year.

== Events ==
The focus of Gary Con is "Old School Renaissance", with games written during Gygax's ownership of TSR getting the most attention.

Games at the convention are often run by designers who originally created the game such as Metamorphosis Alpha run by Jim Ward, Fight in the Skies run by Mike Carr, and boardgames by Tom Wham. Other TSR titles and classic games, such as Chainmail, are run by loyal gamers.

HMGS Midwest (Gygax was a historical wargamer before founding TSR) and Joe Kline's Circus Maximus qualifiers, as well as his modified games, are also well represented."

Recent years have seen the addition of Last Hope Live Action Roleplay, a local LARPing group which attends the convention, trains convention goers in combat, and leads them on a live adventure in which they must face monsters and other opponents in battle, discover and return important items, and solve puzzles.
