= Operation Bifrost =

Operation Bifrost is a 1988 role-playing game adventure published by New Infinities Productions for Cyborg Commando.

== Plot summary ==
Operation Bifrost is an adventure in which the Cyborg Commando force must infiltrate the ruined Asgard complex to uncover whether Dr. Kotusu has created humanity's ultimate weapon against the Xenoborgs—or descended into dangerous madness.

== Publication history ==
Operation Bifrost was published by New Infinities Productions in 1988 as a 48-page book with an outer folder.

== Reception ==
Rick Swan in The Complete Guide to Role-Playing Games called this one "Especially good", noting its "new rules for underground exploration and combat".
