= Warriors of Mars =

Warriors of Mars could refer to:

- Warriors of Mars (game), a 1974 miniature wargame rule book published by TSR
- City of the Beast, or Warriors of Mars, a 1965 novel by Michael Moorcock
- Alien Arena: Warriors of Mars, a 2017 video game by COR Entertainment
