= Film at Eleven =

Film at Eleven is a 1988 role-playing game adventure published by New Infinities Productions for Cyborg Commando.

== Plot summary ==
Film at Eleven is an adventure in which the player characters race against time to aid an Indiana resistance in rescuing captured agents before the Xenoborgs stage their televised execution on the evening news.

== Publication history ==
Film at Eleven was written by Guy W. McLimore, Greg K. Poehlein, and David F. Tepool (FantaSimulations Associates), with a cover by Harry Quinn and David Dorman, and was published by New Infinities Productions in 1988 as a 48-page book with an outer folder.

== Reception ==
Rick Swan in The Complete Guide to Role-Playing Games called this adventure "a rousing adventure set in the Xenoborg-occupied Midwest".
