= San Francisco Knights =

San Francisco Knights is a 1987 role-playing game adventure published by New Infinities Productions for Cyborg Commando.

== Plot summary ==
San Francisco Knights is an adventure in which the player characters players work to establish a new coastal base near Big Sur after the Xenoborgs annihilate the San Francisco installation, in three linked scenarios.

== Publication history ==
San Francisco Knights was written by Penny Petticord and published by New Infinities Productions in 1987 as a 48-page book with an outer folder.

== Reception ==
Rick Swan in The Complete Guide to Role-Playing Games called this one "Especially good", noting that it was ""a three-chapter adventure involving the establishment of a Commando base near Big Sur, California".

== Reviews ==
- Papyrus (Issue 16 - April Fools 1995)
