= Artifact of Evil =

1986 novel by Gary Gygax

- Cover of the first edition
- Author: Gary Gygax
- Language: English
- Series: Gord the Rogue
- Genre: Fantasy
- Publisher: TSR, Inc.
- Publication date: 1986
- Publication place: United States
- Media type: Print (Paperback)
- Preceded by: Saga of Old City
- Followed by: City of Hawks

Artifact of Evil is a 1986 fantasy novel by Gary Gygax, set in the world of Greyhawk, which is based on the Dungeons & Dragons fantasy role-playing game.

== Plot summary ==
Artifact of Evil was the second novel to feature Gord the Rogue. Gord and his companions must stop a recently uncovered ancient artifact from falling into the wrong hands, as its power could destroy their world.

This was the first novel to feature the drow prominently. Other characters appearing in the book include Melf of the Arrow (who has sworn fealty to Mordenkainen), Anthraxus the Oinodaemon (who appears to the Horned Society as a messenger for Nerull), the dwarf Obmi, and the losel (mixtures of orcs and baboons).

== Publication history ==
Gary Gygax wrote Artifact of Evil as a continuation of his first novel, Saga of Old City, and it was published in 1986 as the final novel under TSR's Greyhawk Adventures banner that was written by Gygax.

== Reception ==
Dave Langford reviewed Artifact of Evil for White Dwarf #78, quipping "At first glimpse within, my soul was purged by the brutalities visited upon the English language", and concluding that the story was nothing more than "an AD&D campaign write-up".

In the Io9 series revisiting older Dungeons & Dragons novels, Rob Bricken commented that "Artifact of Evil rolls a 5 on a d20, making it a bit higher than Saga of Old City's original 4. But whereas Saga took a -2 penalty for general unpleasantness and lack of a coherent narrative, Artifact avoids it by being mostly okay and kind of having a coherent narrative. However, both books still earn a -3 penalty for needless misogyny, so Artifact of Evil ends with a 2. Not good, but... no. It's simply not good. If you somehow manage to track a copy down, stop tracking that copy down immediately."

== Reviews ==
- Voice of Youth Advocates (August 1986)
