= Stephen Chenault =

American designer

- Occupation: Game designer
- Known for: Troll Lord Games, Castles & Crusades

Stephen Chenault is a game designer who has worked primarily on role-playing games. He is also the co-founder and CEO of Troll Lord Games.

== Career ==
Stephen Chenault and his brother Davis Chenault wanted to publish a 300-page leather bound campaign setting. When Stephen learned that Mac Golden was thinking of publishing a game magazine called The Seeker, they formed Troll Lord Games in 1999 with Davis Chenault. They then published a series of "universal" role-playing game adventures, and they prepared three of them for Gen Con 33: After Winter's Dark (2000) which described the Erde campaign setting; The Mortality of Green (2000) adventure for Erde; and Vakhund: Into the Unknown (2000) adventure for the Inzae campaign setting and first part of a trilogy. Stephen Chenault authored A Lion in the Ropes (2001), a d20 mystery adventure and the first d20 adventure from Troll Lord Games.

The Chenaults also finally published their Winter Dark world of Erde campaign setting in the Codex of Erde (2001). Gary Gygax wrote to the Chenaults to thank them for their gift of the first Troll Lord role-playing game supplements at Gen Con 33, and their resulting conversation ultimately led Gygax to make an offer to write supplements for Troll Lord.

The Chenaults released reprints of some of their classics as supplements for their Castles & Crusades role-playing game, such as I1: Vakhund: Into the Unknown (2006). Troll Lord Games lost the licenses to all of the works by Gygax when he died in 2008, but the Chenaults honored his legacy and his role in the success of their company by adding a memorial on to Gygax on their main web page.
