= A Lion in the Ropes =

2001 roleplaying adventure

- Publisher: Troll Lord Games
- Publication date: 2001
- ISBN: 978-1-944135-62-1

A Lion in the Ropes is a 2001 role-playing game adventure published by Troll Lord Games.

== Plot summary ==
A Lion in the Ropes is an adventure in which the player characters must solve a mass murder mystery.

== Publication history ==
Shannon Appelcline noted that "In 2001 Troll Lord Games was back with a focus on gaming's newest trend, d20. Much like the rest of the industry, they began publishing d20 adventures, the first of which was A Lion in the Ropes (2001), a d20 mystery by Stephen Chenault."

== Reviews ==
- Pyramid
- Backstab
- Polyhedron (Issue 147, Vol.21, No.2)
