= Davis Chenault =

American game designer

- Occupation: Game designer

Davis Chenault is a game designer who has worked primarily on role-playing games.

== Career ==
Davis Chenault and his brother Stephen Chenault wanted to publish a 300-page leather bound campaign setting. When Stephen learned that Mac Golden was thinking of publishing a game magazine called The Seeker, they formed Troll Lord Games in 1999 with Davis Chenault and published a series of "universal" role-playing game adventures, and they prepared three of them for Gen Con 33: After Winter's Dark (2000) which described the Erde campaign setting; The Mortality of Green (2000) adventure for Erde; and Vakhund: Into the Unknown (2000) adventure for the Inzae campaign setting and first part of a trilogy. The Chenaults also finally published their Winter Dark world of Erde campaign setting in the Codex of Erde (2001). Gary Gygax wrote to the Chenaults to thank them for their gift of the first Troll Lord role-playing game supplements at Gen Con 33, and their resulting conversation ultimately led Gygax to make an offer to write supplements for Troll Lord. Davis Chenault wrote Bergholt I: By Shadow of Night (2003) as a companion book intended to start an adventure trilogy taking place in Inzae but the sequels were not published. The Chenaults released reprints of some of their classics as supplements for their Castles & Crusades role-playing game, such as I1: Vakhund: Into the Unknown (2006). Troll Lord Games lost the licenses to all of the works by Gygax when he died in 2008, but the Chenaults honored his legacy and his role in the success of their company by adding a memorial on to Gygax on their main web page.
