= Dungeon Geomorphs =

Tabletop role-playing game supplement for Dungeons & Dragons

- Author: Gary Gygax
- Genre: Role-playing game
- Publisher: TSR
- Publication date: 1976

Dungeon Geomorphs is an accessory for the Dungeons & Dragons fantasy role-playing game.

== Contents ==
The Dungeon Geomorphs are sets of aids that consist of dungeon map sections. These sections can be cut apart and assembled together in various formations. Set One was for typical dungeon corridors and rooms; Set Two was for unusual dungeon corridors and rooms; and Set Three was for larger, even more unusual dungeons, corridors and rooms. The Outdoor Geomorphs set was for a medieval walled city.

== Publication history ==
Dungeon Geomorphs, Set One: Basic Dungeon was designed by Gary Gygax and published by TSR in 1976. Dungeon Geomorphs, Set Two: Caves & Caverns was written by Gary and Ernie Gygax, and Dungeons Geomorphs, Set Three: Lower Dungeons was written by Gary. Sets two and three were published by TSR in 1977. Outdoor Geomorphs, Set One: Walled City was designed by Gary and also published by TSR in 1977. All of these initial sets consisted of 12 sheets of puzzle-piece map sections.

Sets One, Two, and Three were compiled in 1980 as the Dungeon Geomorphs set, with 48 cardstock pages and a cover by Bill Willingham. This was printed again in 1981. Each sheet in the booklet is capable of being divided into two square maps sections and one rectangular map section; these sections are partially geomorphic, as not every corridor can be connected with every other one. The geomorphs were not given any scale, although the maps are covered with 1/4" grid squares that can be assigned with any scale from 5 to 20 feet.

== Reception ==
Steve Jackson reviewed the 1980 compilation of Dungeon Geomorphs in The Space Gamer #41 in 1981. Jackson felt that the geomorphs "would be nice" for any Dungeon Master who needed a complex dungeon level "in a hurry". Since they are well-keyed, he noted that "a given layout could be quickly written down for later use", and they allow for many possible combinations. Jackson also commented on the lack of scale on the grid squares, and that "one square could be taken as being anywhere from 5 to 20 feet", although he felt that the designers probably intended them to be 10 feet. He considered the choice of color "a disappointment" and the "only real drawback", as the light-blue ink in which all the maps are printed makes them difficult to read. Jackson concluded that the Dungeon Geomorphs is a nice buy for its price, but not a "must".

Kurt Butterfield's review of the Outdoor Geomorphs appeared in same issue. According to Butterfield, this is a set of city plans that helps a Dungeon Master to construct "a fairly large walled city in a matter of minutes", saving an "enormous" amount of time and leaving the DM only to populate the city and add details. He noted that the walls, towers, and other structures are "clearly mapped out in blue on durable, white graph paper" with marked lines to allow them to be cut out; the square and rectangular pieces can then be fitted together in "almost any fashion" the DM desires. While Butterfield did not find "much wrong with this set", he was annoyed by "some unexplained shaded areas" and the fact that the set was not as large as he would have liked; ultimately, he recommended the city geomorphs to "almost any DM".

== Reviews ==
- The Playboy Winner's Guide to Board Games
