= Castles & Crusades =

2004 fantasy role-playing game

- The Castles & Crusades Player's Handbook, 7th Edition
- Designers: Stephen Chenault, Davis Chenault, Mac Golden, Robert Doyel, Mark Sandy, Todd Gray, James M. Ward
- Publishers: Troll Lord Games
- Publication: 2004
- Genres: Fantasy
- Systems: SIEGE Engine, modified d20 System

Castles & Crusades (C&C) is a fantasy role-playing game published in 2004 by Troll Lord Games that is based on a simplified variant of the d20 System created by Wizards of the Coast. The game system is designed to emulate the play style of earlier editions of the Dungeons & Dragons game while keeping the unified mechanics of the d20 System.

== Description ==
Castles & Crusades is a fantasy role-playing game designed to hearken back to the earliest days of D&D, while taking into account the improvements in role-playing rules that had occurred over the previous 30 years. The game's name comes from the Castle & Crusade Society, a games club founded by D&D co-creator Gary Gygax in 1970, four years before the publication of D&D. As RPG historian Stu Horvath pointed out, C&C was "developed with an eye toward emulating the feel of the original Dungeons & Dragons."

Like D&D, its spiritual predecessor, the first edition of C&C provides the rules for creating characters, as well as how to use abilities, skills, weapons, combat, magic and spells, etc., but it does not provide a campaign world, which must be invented by the Castle Keeper (the gamemaster). Some campaign settings were later released by Troll Lord Games.

=== Campaign setting ===
The core books of the game are generic with regard to setting, but some settings have been published for the game.

Aihrde
Once named Erde, Aihrde is Troll Lord Games' default home setting for all of their games. A full campaign setting, The Codex of Aihrde, was released in 2015.

Bluffside
Bluffside is a conversion and expansion of an earlier product released by Thunderhead Games, and can be added to an existing campaign, or it can be used as a campaign setting on its own.

Haunted Highlands
Introduced with the "DB" series of adventures.

Inzae
Troll Lord Games' gritty, realistic setting, introduced with the "I" series of adventures.

=== System ===
C&C uses a simplified version of the d20 system designed by Wizards of the Coast, which uses the alignment, attributes, hit points and ascending armor class systems from d20. In addition, most of the core classes and races are similar to those found in D&D, though with some modifications, with some new classes having been added while others have been dropped. However, the complex skills and feats system found in the 3rd edition of D&D has been discarded in favor of a new rules system called the Siege Engine, which is used to resolve all non-combat actions. Overall, C&C rules are compliant with the terms of the Open Game License.

==== Siege Engine ====
The Siege Engine works on an attribute check system. A character's attributes are divided into primary and secondary attributes. Checks made against primary attributes have a Challenge Base (CB) of 12, while secondary attributes have a CB of 18. The Castle Keeper adds a challenge level from 1–10, depending on task difficulty, to the CB and the resulting number, the Challenge Class (CC), is the final target number required to succeed at a check. The player adds the character's level, any attribute bonuses and class bonuses to the roll of a twenty-sided die. If the result after bonuses equals or exceeds the CC, the player succeeds.

== Publication history ==
"White box" first edition featuring cover art by Peter Bradley, 2004

C&C was designed by Davis Chenault and Mac Golden. They planned to launch the new game at Gen Con 2004 with their Player's Handbook, but production issues meant it would not be ready in time. Instead, they brought a limited run of 1000 copies of a boxed set meant to recall the original "white box" edition of Dungeons & Dragons. The box contained three digest-sized booklets, "Zocchi"-style dice with unpainted numbers, and a crayon (for coloring in the dice numbers).

In December 2004, the first printing of the Players Handbook was released. While the first two printings of the Players Handbook were virtually identical with the exception of a change in font for the headers, the third printing introduced a replacement barbarian class. The 4th printing introduced an expansion to the illusionist written by James M. Ward that allowed the illusionist to heal others. The 7th edition introduced a streamlined replacement to the game's encumbrance rules for faster play.

After the game's release, the new system received valuable support from Gary Gygax and Rob Kuntz, who used C&C rules to resurrect their old Castle Greyhawk D&D home campaign (now renamed "Castle Zagyg").

Troll Lord Games supplemented the Player's Handbook with Monsters & Treasure in 2005. The Castle Keeper's Guide was published in 2010.

The company launched a Kickstarter for the Adventurer's Backpack in October 2016 as a major rules expansion.

== Reception ==
In his 2023 book Monsters, Aliens, and Holes in the Ground, RPG historian Stu Horvath noted, "Castles & Crusades was built with the d20 system, but it played like an older D&D. It was faster, it favored rulings over rules, and, in so doing, it encouraged creativity and improvisation in play ... It felt fresh and free when compared to the ever-growing mountain of reference books available for the mainline D&D. Horvath credited C&C with kickstarting the Old School Revival movement in the fantasy role-playing world.

== Awards ==
Castles & Crusades was a finalist at the 2005 ENnie Award in the category "Best d20 Game".
