= Dunkirk: The Battle of France =

Dunkirk: The Battle of France is an out of print World War II board wargame simulating Operation Dynamo. It was designed by Gary Gygax and published by Guidon Games in 1971. In a 2004 interview Gygax remarked:

One of the most satisfying compliments I ever received was from one of the principals of Game Designers' Workshop, that laud in regards to the detail of the order of battle of the forces involved in the Dunkirk game. Since originally designing it, I have done more research, corrected some errors I discovered in the German OB, and one day I would very much like to see the campaign in play as a computer game.

== Reviews ==
- Panzerfaust #54
