= Lejendary Adventure =

Tabletop role-playing game

- Rulebook cover
- Designers: Gary Gygax
- Publishers: Hekaforge Productions, Troll Lord Games
- Publication: 1999; 27 years ago
- Genres: Fantasy
- Systems: Custom

Lejendary Adventure is a role-playing game created by Gary Gygax, the co-creator of Dungeons & Dragons and creator of Advanced Dungeons & Dragons.

== Publication history ==
Gygax originally devised Lejendary Adventure as a role-playing video game, but he later decided to develop the game as a printed fantasy RPG.

Lejendary Adventure products were published by both Hekaforge Productions and Troll Lord Games. Three months after Gygax's death in 2008, his widow Gail withdrew all of the licenses from Troll Lord and also from Hekaforge. The game has been out of print since.

== Gameplay ==
Like other role-playing games, Lejendary Adventure is played using polyhedral dice, pencils, paper, and sometimes miniatures. Unlike Dungeons & Dragons, Lejendary Adventure has a player character creation system that is skill-based rather than ability based, resulting in even more flexible character creation to allow role-playing of almost any kind of character. Lejendary Adventures still provide Archetypes using "Orders." Orders are guild-like organizations that provide benefits to the characters. Players can also choose to be unordered. Order is determined by the character's first chosen ability. Orders include the Noble, Rogue, and Elementalist. Unordered characters still advance, but they do so without the benefit of a guild.

Various races are also available, with different definitions from other RPGs. Races in Lejendary Adventure include Dwarves, Ilves, Wylves (Ilves and Wylves are two of many Fair Alfar, i.e. what are usually called elves in other RPGs), Gnomes, Kobolds, and Veshoge. As for character advancement, instead of levels, Lejendary Adventure characters receive Merits—points that can be used to increase their Abilities or Base Ratings, as well as buy new Abilities.

The standard campaign setting is Lejendary Earth, called Learth.

== Lejendary Adventure products ==
- Rule Books:
  - The Lejendary Rules for All Players – Fantasy Role-Playing Game core rulebook, Hekaforge Productions, 1999
  - The Lejend Master's Lore – Fantasy Role-Playing Game core rulebook, Hekaforge Productions, 2000
  - The Beasts of Lejend – Fantasy Role-Playing Game core rulebook, Hekaforge Productions, 2000
  - More Beasts of Legend – Troll Lord Games, 2007
- Campaign World Books:
  - Lejendary Earth Gazetteer – World Setting sourcebook Part 1, Hekaforge Productions, 2002
  - Noble Kings and Dark Lands – LE World Setting Part 2, (Gary Gygax with Chris Clark) Hekaforge Productions, 2003
  - The Exotic Realms of Hazgar – LE World Setting Part 3, (Gary Gygax with Chris Clark) Hekaforge Productions, 2006
  - Jewels of the East - possibly never produced
- Adventure Scenarios:
  - Terekaptra: Lost City of the Utiss – (Chris Clark)
  - Enclave – (Chris Clark), Adventure module editor, Hekaforge Productions, 2000
  - The Lejendary Road – (Jon Creffield)
  - The Dance of the Fairie Ring – (Jon Creffield)
  - The Mouth of the Marsh – (Jon Creffield)
  - Cavalcade – (Larry D. Hols) included with Lejend Master's Screen
  - The Rock – (Chris Clark)
  - The Hermit (Gary Gygax) – dual-stat d20/LA game adventure module, Troll Lord Games, August 2002
  - Hall of Many Panes – (Gary Gygax with Jon Creffield) Campaign Adventure Module Boxed Set with d20 stats included, Troll Lord Games 2005
  - Forlorn Corners – adventure module included serially as a part of the Author's Signed and Number Edition and Premier Editions of the three core rules noted above (1999–2000)
  - They Who Watch – (Jon Creffield) published by Troll Lord Games
  - Fish for Breakfast – (Greg Ellis) published by Troll Lord Games
  - The Sundering I – "Shadow of Apix by" (Dan Cross) - possibly never produced
  - The Sundering II – "The King of Madness" (Dan Cross) - possibly never produced
  - A Question of Tribute – (Jon Creffield) - possibly never produced
- Boxed Sets and Expansions:
  - The Lejendary Adventure Essentials – Primer Boxed Set for the LA RPG, Troll Lord Games, 2005
  - Tome of Knowledge Sourcebook – Core Rules additions for the LA RPG, Troll Lord Games possibly never produced
  - Living the Lejend – Adventure Module, Campaign Setting, & Expansion for the LA Essentials Boxed Set, Troll Lord Games (Summer of 2005)

In addition, more general RPG books offer some new Lejendary Adventure material as well (Orders, etc.).

- Gary Gygax’s The Canting Crew, the Criminal Underclass, “Gygaxian Fantasy Worlds, Volume I” – Troll Lord Games, May 2002

== Related media ==
- A PC MMORPG titled Lejendary Adventure or Lejendary Adventure Online was in development since 2002 and has since been cancelled.
