= Cyborg Commando =

Post-apocalyptic role-playing game

- Cyborg Commando Set 1: The Battle For Earth
- Designers: Gary Gygax, Frank Mentzer, Kim Mohan
- Publishers: New Infinities
- Publication: 1987
- Genres: Science fiction
- Systems: Custom

Cyborg Commando is a post-apocalyptic role-playing game (RPG) published by New Infinities Productions, Inc. (NIPI) in 1987. The game was created by the well-known game designers Gary Gygax, Frank Mentzer and Kim Mohan, but was a commercial failure.

== Description ==
The game is set in 2035 when Earth is invaded by aliens called Xenoborgs. For its defense, humanity has developed a new kind of soldier: the Cyborg Commando, a mechanical/electronical human-like structure that can be implanted with a willing human's brain.

== 10X system ==
Cyborg Commando introduced the "10X" dice-rolling mechanism: To determine the success or failure of a skill challenge or combat, the player rolls two 10-sided dice and multiplies the results. (Example: The player rolls a 2 and a 10 and multiplies them together for a result of 20.) Unlike many role-playing games of the time where higher results were more favorable, in this game, lower results are needed for success.

== Publication history ==
Gary Gygax was the co-creator of the fantasy role-playing game Dungeons & Dragons, first published by TSR in 1974. But by 1986, Gygax had lost control of TSR, and left the company to form NIPI, taking former TSR employees Frank Menzer and Kim Mohan with him. Cyborg Commando was their first game, designed by Mohan and Mentzer based on an outline by Gygax. Although the names of the creators, well-known by game players, featured heavily in the game's promotion, the grim dystopian setting and robots with human brains failed to click with Gygax's fantasy gamers. As game critic Rick Swan noted, "Its difficult rules and narrow scope severely limited its appeal." Ultimately, the game was a commercial failure.

Although two more boxed sets were planned and promoted, in the end, only four adventures for the game system were ever published:

1. Rescue 1: Ocala Crossing 1987 (Only available in the preview booklet sent to those who purchased a limited signed edition of the boxed set)
2. San Francisco Knights 1987 ISBN 0-941993-21-3
3. Film at Eleven 1987 ISBN 0-941993-22-1
4. Operation Bifrost 1988 ISBN 0-941993-24-8

A fifth adventure, Operation: Safari, written by Frank Mentzer, was announced but never released.

=== Novels ===
Three Cyborg Commando novels were published not long after the game with minor modifications of Cyborg Commando's skills and behaviour, which prompted a short explanation at the back of the books for game owners detailing why the changes were made.

1. Planet in Peril by Kim Mohan and Pamela O'Neill. Published in November 1987 by Ace/New Infinities, Inc. ISBN 0-441-66883-6.
2. Chase into Space by Kim Mohan and Pamela O'Neill. Published in January 1988 by New Infinities, Inc. ISBN 0-441-10294-8.
3. The Ultimate Prize by Kim Mohan and Pamela O'Neill. Published in March 1988 by New Infinities, Inc. ISBN 0-441-84325-5.

== Reception ==
Stewart Wieck reviewed Cyborg Commando in White Wolf #9 (1988), rating it an 8 out of 10 and stated that "This is not a game for the beginner. The material can be daunting even in the eyes of a seasoned gamer. Surprisingly, all this glitter is gold."

In his 1990 book The Complete Guide to Role-Playing Games, game critic Rick Swan thought the game was "a first-rate design — innovative, compelling and startling in its uncompromising approach to science-fiction gaming." However, Swan warned that "Though the rules are straightforward and clearly explained, they're also quite complicated ... The no-nonsense approach and sheer volume of detail can overwhelm even the most experienced player." Swan concluded by giving the game an excellent rating of 3.5 out of 4, saying, "For those up to the challenge, it's definitely worth checking out — Cyborg Commando is hardcore role-playing at its best."

Lynn Bryant reviewed the novels Planet in Peril and Chase into Space in Space Gamer/Fantasy Gamer No. 83, and commented that "They prove to be tightly written, well plotted, full of action, and just plain good reading. You get insight into what it is like to lose most of your body to mechanical substitutes and then have to fight a war. There is also a good sense of the outrage all the race will feel at being invaded. Even if you never look at the game, you'll enjoy the books."

Writing 27 years after Cyborg Commando's publication, game historian Shannon Appelcline noted the game's complex rules and the lack of connection to Gygax's D&D fans, and wrote, "As a result of these various factors, Cyborg Commando is today seen as one of the biggest flops in the industry."

== Reviews ==
- G.M. The Independent Fantasy Roleplaying Magazine #1
