= Troll Lord Games =

Game publisher

- Industry: Publishing
- Founded: 2000; 26 years ago
- Headquarters: Little Rock, Arkansas, USA
- Key people: Stephen Chenault: C.E.O.; Davis Chenault: Chief Strategy Officer; Todd Grey: Chief of Distribution and Sales
- Products: Castles & Crusades; Rings of Brass; The Crusader magazine
- Website: trolllord.com

Troll Lord Games is an American publisher of role-playing games (based on fantasy and swords & sorcery themes), The Crusader magazine and other board, dice, and card games.

They are best known for the Castles & Crusades role-playing game. They served as Gary Gygax's primary publisher from 2001–2008, publishing Lejendary Adventure, Gygaxian Fantasy Worlds and other book lines.

== History ==
TLG's first published products were a series of adventures designed for the Swords and Sorcery role-playing game (RPG). This RPG was developed by Davis Chenault and Mac Golden. TLG debuted these three adventures, the game system and Stephen Chenault's The After Winter's Dark campaign world at GenCon in 2000. These releases coincided with the release of d20 Dungeons & Dragons. Within a very short while TLG republished the books under the d20 license. At about this time they signed Gary Gygax and committed to the Gygaxian Fantasy World series. The series was launched with The Canting Crew, by Gary Gygax, in 2001.

Shortly thereafter TLG published the Codex of Erde (later Aihrde), a fantasy world campaign setting and sourcebook for RPGs. It saw release in 2001 and was written by Stephen Chenault and Mac Golden with contributions by Davis Chenault and Gary Gygax.

Stephen Chenault recounts the origins of the Codex of Erde and how they were enmeshed with the founding of TLG as a company, in The Crusader magazine.

In this book, Gary Gygax wrote an introductory adventure, Search for a Lost City. It was a prelude to another TLG RPG book also released in 2001, called The Lost City of Gaxmoor, written by Ernie Gygax and Luke Gygax.

On June 11, 2001, Stephen Chenault and Davis Chenault announced that Gary Gygax would be writing books for Troll Lord Games. Gygax's early work for Troll Lord included a series of hardcover books that eventually came to be called "Gygaxian Fantasy Worlds"; the first was The Canting Crew (2002), a look at the roguish underworld. He also wrote World Builder (2003) and Living Fantasy (2003), generic game design books usable in many different settings. After the first four books in the series, Gygax stepped down from writing and took on an advisory role, though the series logo still carried his name. Troll Lord also published a few adventures as a result of their partnership with Gygax, including The Hermit (2002) an adventure intended for d20 and also for Lejendary Adventures.

TLG also produced and published a string of RPG adventure modules taking place in the fantasy campaign world of Erde.

Another module written for the world of Erde was called Dark Druids written by Robert J. Kuntz, RPG author and ex-employee of TSR, Inc. It was released in 2002.

Also in 2002, Gary Gygax and TLG continued to work together to produce the Gygaxian Fantasy Worlds series of RPG “world builder” books. In 2004 TLG broke away from D&D/d20 related titles to publish their own game Castles & Crusades, named after Gary Gygax's original gaming club.

In 2005 TLG took over the publishing of Gary Gygax’s Lejendary Adventure products and produced a boxed set with a scaled down version of the rules and monsters called Essentials. Following this, came the release of Living the Legend, a LA module written by Gygax.

2008 saw a new hard cover release and reprinting of the Greyhawk Adventures book Saga of Old City, a Gord the Rogue novel by Gary Gygax.

== Castles & Crusades ==
The Castles & Crusades RPG Collector’s Box Set was produced in 2004. It contained a Players Handbook, a Monsters & Treasure booklet and an introductory adventure booklet; all were digest size like the original Dungeons & Dragons boxed set.

2005 proved to be a busy and productive year for TLG:

- They released Gary Gygax’s 256 page, RPG campaign setting/adventures book called Castle Zagyg: Yggsburgh for the Castles & Crusades game. A large double-sided fold out color map of the city and environs was rendered by Darlene, the former TSR, Inc artist who drew the World of Greyhawk hex map that was included with the WoG boxed set.
- The first module written for Castle Zagyg: Yggsburgh was another one from Robert J. Kuntz, called Dark Chateau.
- Davis Chenault wrote and TLG published the first full RPG module in the "A" series of adventures for Castles & Crusades, set in the fantasy world of Erde. It is titled Assault on Blacktooth Ridge (A1). (A2 through A5 have been released of the total 13 planned).

Gary Gygax continued to work on Castle Zagyg volume II into 2006 and 2007.

At Gen Con 40 in 2007, Gary Gygax was the Guest of Honor at the TLG booth. It would be his last Gen Con. The long-awaited Castle Zagyg: The Upper Works made its debut at the TLG booth the following year, 2008.

In 2007 TLG published an update of the fantasy campaign World of Erde, changing the name to Aihrde and releasing a 48-page gazetteer called After Winter’s Dark which established Aihrde as the official Castles & Crusades adventure setting.

A collection of alternate rules and guidelines for modifying the system, the Castle Keepers Guide, was released in February 2011.
