= Gord the Rogue =

Fictional character

- World of Greyhawk character

In-universe information
- Race: Human
- Gender: Male
- Class: Thief-Acrobat
- Alignment: Neutral
- Home: Free City of Greyhawk

- Saga of Old City (1985); Artifact of Evil (1986); Sea of Death (1987); Night Arrant (1987, short stories); City of Hawks (1987); Come Endless Darkness (1988); Dance of Demons (1988)
- Author: Gary Gygax
- Cover artist: Clyde Caldwell, Ray Rubin, Jerry Tiritilli
- Country: USA
- Language: English
- Publisher: TSR, Inc., New Infinities Productions
- Published: 1985 - 1988

Gord the Rogue is the protagonist in a series of fantasy novels and short stories written by Gary Gygax. Gygax originally wrote the novels and short stories to promote his World of Greyhawk campaign setting for the Dungeons & Dragons role-playing game. After he left TSR, Gygax continued to write Gord the Rogue novels for several years. In all of these works, the plot revolves around the adventures of a young man named Gord who rises from humble origins in the slums of a large city on the planet Oerth to become a powerful force trying to stave off the takeover of Oerth by demons.

== Publication history ==
One of the factors that contributed to the success of the Dragonlance setting when it was published in 1984 was a popular series of concurrent novels by Tracy Hickman and Margaret Weis. Gary Gygax, the developer of the World of Greyhawk campaign setting, realized that novels set in Greyhawk could have a similar benefit for his recently published World of Greyhawk boxed set, so he wrote Saga of Old City, the first in a series of novels that would be published under the banner Greyhawk Adventures. The protagonist was Gord the Rogue, and this first novel told of his rise from the Slum Quarter of the city of Greyhawk to become world traveller and thief extraordinaire. The novel was designed to promote sales of the boxed set by providing colourful details about the social customs and peoples of various cities and countries in a region called the Flanaess.

Shannon Appelcline noted that "Gygax introduced Gord in Dragon #100 (August 1985) in a story called "At Moonset Blackcat Comes." The first novel, Saga of Old City (1985) appeared a couple of months later." Appelcline also noted that as TSR published the last projects that Gygax started, "A few more Greyhawk books appeared as well. The first of those was Artifact of Evil (1986), Gygax's second and final Gord the Rogue novel for TSR." Appelcline commented that "After Gygax left TSR in 1985, the Greyhawk setting forked. Gygax himself retained rights to his fictional character, Gord the Rogue — as well as a few characters whose names derived from his, such as Zagyg the Mad Wizard. Over the next several years, Gygax used those rights to publish a series of Gord the Rogue novels ending with Dance of Demons (1988) in which Gygax destroyed Oerth (!) and replaced it with the world of Yarth — which may or may not have been the Aerth of Mythus (1992)."

Appelcline explained that since Gygax retained his rights to Gord when he started New Infinites, "Now, he licensed Greyhawk from TSR and started writing new books. The first was Sea of Death (1987), and it quickly hit bestseller lists. Over the next years, the success of the Gord novels would continue, and they would be the main thing keeping New Infinities in business. As a result, Gygax would spend most of his time at New Infinities working on books rather than RPGs." Appelcline noted that "Gygax's Gord the Rogue appeared a few times after New Infinities disappeared, once in White Wolf 's Pawn of Chaos: Tales of the Eternal Champion (1996) and once in Paizo Publishing's Dragon Magazine #344 (2006). Some of his stories were also reprinted by Troll Lord Games and Paizo Publishing." Appelcline also noted that in 2006 "Troll Lord Games revealed that they had licensed Gygax's Gord the Rogue novels, previously published by TSR and New Infinities Productions. The first, Tale of Old City (2008), would unfortunately be one of Troll Lord's final Gygax publications."

Even before Saga of Old City rolled off the presses in November 1985, Gygax wrote a sequel, Artifact of Evil. He also wrote a short story, "At Moonset Blackcat Comes", that appeared in the special 100th issue of Dragon magazine in August 1985. This introduced Gord the Rogue to gamers just before Saga of Old City was scheduled to be released.

However, at the same time, various factions within TSR with different visions of the company's future caused a power struggle, and Gygax was forced out on December 31, 1985. By the terms of his settlement with TSR, Gygax kept the rights to Gord the Rogue as well as all D&D characters whose names were anagrams or plays on his own name (for example, Yrag and Zagyg).

After Gygax left TSR in 1985, he continued to write a few more Gord the Rogue novels, which were published by New Infinities Productions: Sea of Death (1987), Night Arrant (1987), City of Hawks (1987), Come Endless Darkness (1988), and Dance of Demons (1988). In Gygax's absence, however, TSR moved the Greyhawk storyline in new directions that Gygax didn't appreciate, and the line of Greyhawk Adventures novels (without Gord the Rogue) continued to be written by Rose Estes. In a literary declaration that his old world of Oerth was dead, and wanting to make a clean break with all things Greyhawk and D&D, Gygax destroyed his version of Oerth in the final Gord the Rogue novel, Dance of Demons.

== Series overview ==
The series of novels follows the progress of the orphan beggar Gord, from his lowly youth to his ascension as an avatar of Balance. Gord begins his career with less than heroic motives, but early mentors Gellor the bard and druid Curley Greenleaf continually steer him toward honorable ends. Eventually Gord is revealed to have a kinship with an enigmatic deity named the Catlord.

The series, originally designed to provide some social and descriptive details about Gygax's Greyhawk campaign world that he had not been able to fit into the limited space of either the 1980 folio edition or the 1983 boxed set, were written in a pulp swords and sorcery style reminiscent of Fritz Leiber's Fafhrd and the Gray Mouser short stories. Gygax, who understood D&D appealed more to a male demographic, wrote the novels for that readership.

=== Individual novels ===
Saga of Old City was the first novel in TSR's Greyhawk Adventures series. It starts in Gord's childhood, and ends with his triumphant return to Greyhawk City as a young man and master thief. He learns his trade in the "beggars' guild", and gets involved in the gang war touched off by the beggars encroaching on the official thieves' guild's territory. He travels and has a variety of swashbuckling adventures, ranging from participating in a war to liberating a young noblewoman held hostage.

Artifact of Evil is a continuation of Saga of Old City. This was the final novel under TSR's Greyhawk Adventures banner that was written by Gygax. An ancient artifact is uncovered, whose power could destroy their world. It is up to Gord and his companions to try to stop this artifact of evil from falling into the wrong hands.

Sea of Death, the first of the series published by New Infinities Productions, Inc., has Gord traveling far afield to the Sea of Dust, on a quest for a "Theorpart", hidden in a lost city. He must face rivals sent by demon lords: the psychopathic dwarf Obmi, who serves Zuggtmoy, and the drow priestess Eclavdra, serving Graz'zt. He meets and falls in love with Leda, a clone of Eclavdra. Leda and Gord part at the end of the book as she returns to the Abyss, impersonating Eclavdra in Graz'zt's service for the sake of higher ideals.

Night Arrant is a collection of nine short stories about Gord's adventures, in his early twenties, in the City of Greyhawk.

City of Hawks is a retelling of the events that occurred in Saga of Old City. Gord's rise from simple beggar to master thief are detailed, as is his search for his true heritage.

Come Endless Darkness continues where Sea of Death left off and has Gord continue his quest to stop Tharizdun and Lord Entropy from taking over the Multiverse.

Dance of Demons is the finale, in which Gord and Gellor enter the Abyss on a mission from the world's most powerful forces of Balance, to retrieve the remaining Theorparts. The goal is nothing less than to free Tharizdun, the long-imprisoned god of ultimate evil and entropy, and to finally destroy him. The novel ends with the complete destruction of Oerth, and the unveiling of a new and better world.

=== Uncollected short stories ===
"At Moonset Blackcat Comes" is an early tale of Gord and his friend Chert the barbarian, in which Gord accepts a mission for the Catlord.

"Evening Odds" appears as story 14 in Pawn of Chaos: Tales of the Eternal Champion, an anthology of fiction inspired by Michael Moorcock's Eternal Champion mythos. The story takes place some time after the events of Dance of Demons. Gord has apparently been deposed from his position as the new Catlord and is traveling the alternate realities as a Champion of Balance. In the course of the story he upsets a plot by the archfiend Baphomet on modern Earth.

"The Return of Gord" is a caper story set during Gord's days as a master thief in the City of Greyhawk, and "A Wizard's Thief" is another caper story, involving Gord and Chert, and set in an unnamed city.

Dave Langford, reviewing Artifact of Evil in the April 1986 edition of White Dwarf (Issue 78), was critical of Gygax's writing ability, saying, "At the first glimpse within, my soul was purged by the brutalities visited upon the English language." Langford believed the book was simply "an AD&D campaign write-up" rather than a bona-fide fantasy novel.

=== Other reviews ===
- Voice of Youth Advocates, August, 1986, reviews of Artifact of Evil and The Crimson Sea, p. 169;
- Voice of Youth Advocates, August, 1988, review of City of Hawks, p. 142.

== Description ==
Gord is described as being small for a human, five and a half feet tall, slender and wiry. His eyes are iron-gray in color. He has black hair and olive-toned skin (which allows him to fit in among the Rhennee).

== List of "Gord the Rogue" novels and short stories ==
- Gygax, Gary. "At Moonset Blackcat Comes: A Tale of Gord of Greyhawk." Dragon #100 (TSR, 1985)
- Gygax, Gary. Saga of Old City (TSR, 1985)
- Gygax, Gary. Artifact of Evil (TSR, 1986)
- Gygax, Gary. Sea of Death (New Infinities, 1987)
- Gygax, Gary. Night Arrant (New Infinities, 1987)
- Gygax, Gary. City of Hawks (New Infinities, 1987)
- Gygax, Gary. Come Endless Darkness (New Infinities, 1988)
- Gygax, Gary. Dance of Demons (New Infinities, 1988)
- Gygax, Gary. "Evening Odds." Pawn of Chaos: Tales of the Eternal Champion (White Wolf Publishing, Clarkson, Ga. 1996)
- Gygax, Gary and Bourgoine, K.R. "The Return of Gord." Dragon #344 (Paizo Publishing, 2006)
- Gygax, Gary and Bourgoine, K.R. "A Wizard's Thief." Of Dice & Pen (Game Day Fiction, an imprint of Flying Pen Press, Denver, Co. 2008)

== Reception ==
In a 2021 Io9 series revisiting older Dungeons & Dragons novels, Rob Bricken described Gord as "a young street urchin who rises from poverty and imprisonment to become one of the greatest thieves on the planet" and goes on to say that "Gygax also revels in the misery he can inflict upon Gord". He described Gord's adventures as "a series of ho-hum D&D game sessions" with "no overarching plot" or and "no emotional growth". Bricken felt that the novel and its plot were "all terrible, but it might be mitigated if Gord weren't so deeply unlikeable". Bricken commented after reading Artifact of Evil that "even in this mortal realm, where I've devoted my life to watching bad movies and reading bad books, reading more about Gord feels like a zero-sum game to me".
