= Sagard the Barbarian =

Tabletop role-playing game supplement

Sagard the Barbarian is a series of four Hero's Challenge Gamebooks written by Gary Gygax, co-creator of Dungeons & Dragons and Flint Dille, screenwriter (An American Tail: Fievel Goes West, The Transformers: The Movie) and game writer/designer (Dead to Rights, The Chronicles of Riddick: Escape from Butcher Bay). The four books star the eponymous hero Sagard the Barbarian, and are titled The Ice Dragon, The Green Hydra, The Crimson Sea and The Fire Demon. They were 'fight a path' adventures which added a fighting game system to the normal pick-a-path game system.

== History ==
Flint Dille met Gary Gygax while Gygax was in Hollywood and they began collaborating on a number of projects, including the Sagard the Barbarian gamebook series (1985-1986), which was published by Pocket Books.
