= Flint Dille =

American screenwriter, game designer and novelist

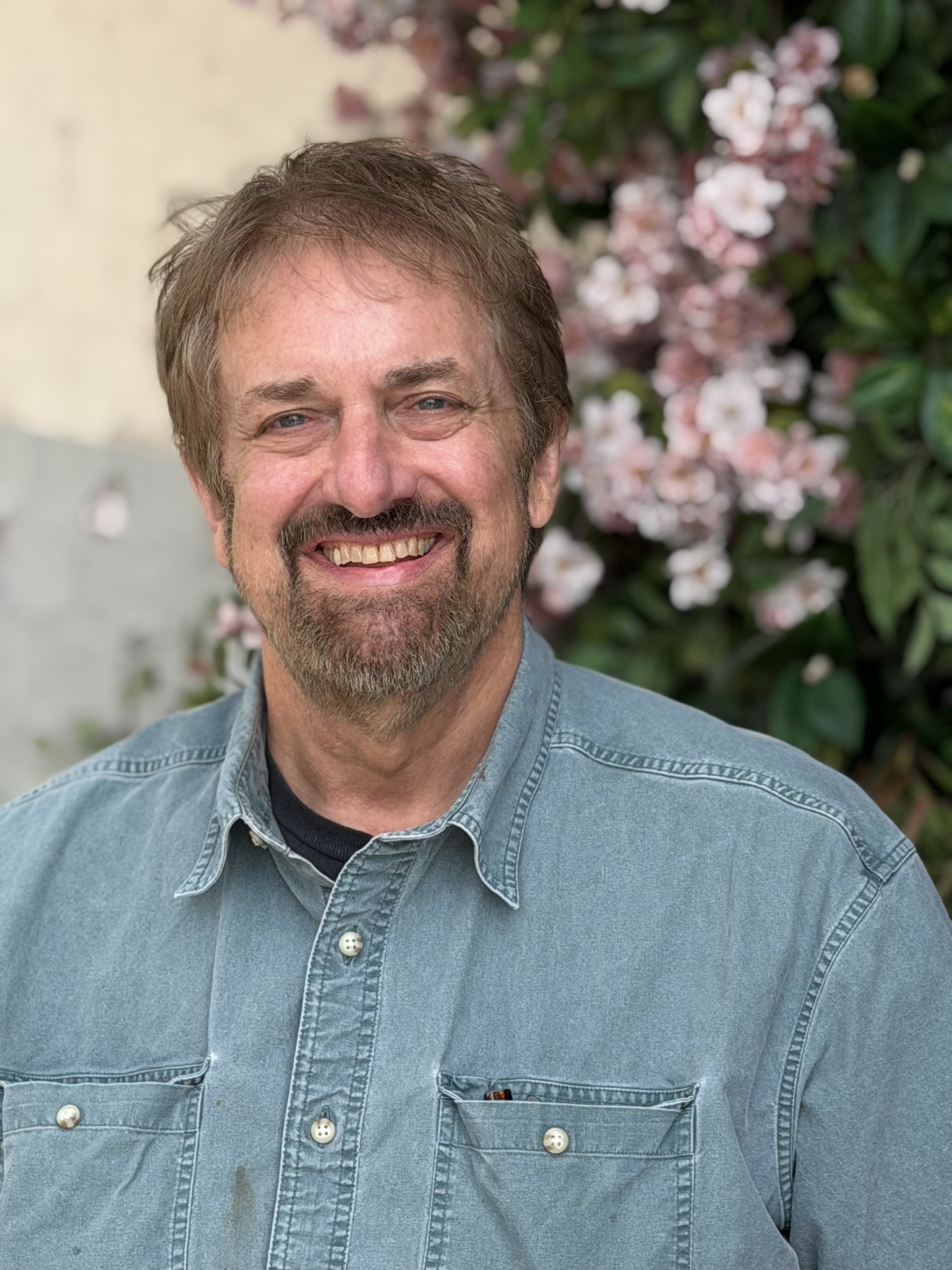
- Dille in 2026
- Born: 1955; Chicago, Illinois, U.S.
- Occupations: Screenwriter, game designer, novelist
- Relatives: John F. Dille (grandfather)

Flint Dille (/ˈdɪli/; born 1955) is an American screenwriter, game designer and novelist. He is best known for his animated work on Transformers, G.I. Joe, An American Tail: Fievel Goes West, and his game-writing, The Chronicles of Riddick: Escape from Butcher Bay, and Dead to Rights, as well as a non-fiction book written with John Zuur Platten, The Ultimate Guide to Video Game Writing and Design.

== Personal background ==
Dille was born in Chicago, Illinois, the son of Robert Crabtree Dille and Virginia Nichols Dille. He attended Glenbrook South High School. In 1977, he graduated from U.C. Berkeley with a Bachelor's degree in Ancient History and Classical Rhetoric. He received a Master of Fine Arts in Professional Writing (Cinema) from the University of Southern California. He lives in Los Angeles, California.

Flint Dille is the grandson of John F. Dille, publisher of the original Buck Rogers comic strip, and is part of the Dille Family Trust, which owned the rights to the character.

== Professional background ==
After grad school, Dille worked as a freelance script reader, production assistant, and assistant art director before getting his first writing job from Joe Ruby at Ruby-Spears as a Saturday Morning Development writer. This led to writing scripts for Mr. T., The Puppy, and RoboForce. Later, Dille went to work for Sunbow Productions and served in various capacities as a writer, story editor, associate producer, and co-producer on several shows, including The Transformers, G.I. Joe, Inhumanoids and Visionaries.

Dille was a story editor for the first season of G.I. Joe (1985). He also wrote the episodes "The Gamesmaster", "Eau De Cobra", and ""Skeletons in the Closet", and co-wrote the episodes "The Pit of Vipers", "The Wrong Stuff", "Grey Hairs and Growing Pains", and "G.I. Joe and the Golden Fleece".

Dille joined the production team of The Transformers as a supervising story editor in the show's second season (1985-1986) and also co-wrote the episode "Prime Target" with his G.I. Joe colleague Buzz Dixon. Dille worked on an extensive rewrite of Ron Friedman's screenplay for The Transformers: The Movie (1986); although Friedman contractually received sole screenplay credit, Dille was credited onscreen as the film's story consultant. After the movie, Dille served as a story editor for the third season of The Transformers (1986-1987) and wrote the season's five-part opening story, "Five Faces of Darkness."

Dille returned to G.I. Joe after the series was taken over by DIC Entertainment, co-writing the episode "Injustice and the Cobra Way" for the show's first DIC season (1990-1991).

Dille worked briefly at CBS on the in-house production of Garbage Pail Kids, before working with Amblin Entertainment on several projects, including An American Tail: Fievel Goes West, Tiny Toons (as a movie), and We're Back! A Dinosaur's Story.

=== TSR and Dungeons & Dragons ===
Dille met Gary Gygax, co-creator of Dungeons & Dragons, while Gygax was in Hollywood and they began collaborating on a number of projects, including the Sagard the Barbarian gamebook series (1985-1986), which was published by Pocket Books. Dille co-authored a script with Gygax for a Dungeons & Dragons film; however, the film was never made. Dille introduced his sister Lorraine Williams to Gygax at Gygax's request. TSR was having financial difficulties, and she was suggested as both a potential investor and as a skilled manager; she was brought in to TSR as Vice President and Administration. In 1989, TSR expanded its operations to the west coast to get adaptations of D&D back on television and into movies; Dille was put in charge of this new department, which was named TSR West. Dille was able to get the boardgame A Line in the Sand (1991) published the same day the US bombing started in the first Gulf War, as he could convince the company president to move quickly. The Buck Rogers roleplaying game XXVc was started TSR West, but Dille was unable to finish the game so it was sent back east.

For the rest of the 1980s, Dille focused on animation writing and game writing and design. At TSR, Dille worked on Dragonstrike, for which he wrote and directed the video portion. Dille also directed several interactive audio projects, including First Quest, Karameikos, Red Steel and Planescape. The TSR Audio Disc Terror T.R.A.X: Track of the Vampyre, was later adapted into a CD-ROM by Grolier, directed by Dille and programmed by Peter Marx and Evolutionary Publishing.

Dille co-wrote the Agent 13: The Midnight Avenger series of novels and graphic novels with David Marconi and also the Buck Rogers XXVC comic modules Rude Awakening.

=== Interactive Games ===
Dille's career shifted to interactive games in the late 1980s when he worked on several projects for the Sega CD platform, including Double Switch, Maximum Surge and Corpse Killer. Dille then worked on Soviet Strike and Nuclear Strike for Electronic Arts, writing the videos and completing his transition from paper games and products to video games.

Dille won "Story of the Year" for his work on The Chronicles of Riddick: Escape from Butcher Bay and on Dead to Rights. Dille was the writer for other video games, including Fantastic Four 2, Teen Titans, Superman Returns, James Bond: Tomorrow Never Dies, Soviet Strike, and Nuclear Strike.

=== Frank Miller ===
Dille is a close friend of comics creator Frank Miller; "Frank and I met during what I call our 'professional adolescence' when he was doing the Dark Knight and I was doing the Transformers cartoon series", says Dille, "and we've been great friends ever since". Dille was selected to lead the design, scriptwriting, story generation, and production of a video game adaptation of Miller's Sin City for Red Mile Entertainment. Miller planned to direct a Buck Rogers film, with Dille as producer, but this project was scrapped in 2009. The character of Dilios in Miller's graphic novel 300 (1998), loosely based on Aristodemus of Sparta, is named after Dille.

=== Ingress ===
Google revealed Flint Dille to be the creative lead of alternate reality, geolocaton-based game Ingress on All Tech Considered, an NPR radio segment. The project operates as if it isn't a game, presenting itself as reality at Wyrd Con 2014. At ComiCon 2014 Dille spoke on the panel "Story Worlds: The Alchemy of Franchise Creation." Using his experience with Ingress, he explained the way different medias are growing interconnected.

=== Niantic Labs ===
Niantic Labs spun out of Google in 2015, although Google remained a major backer. Dille was revealed to be leaving Google with Niantic Labs and continuing in his position as Creative Lead.

=== Autocracy ===
Recently Flint Dille completed a Transformers graphic novel trilogy, Autocracy, with Chris Metzen and Livio Ramondelli. The series follows the origins of Optimus Prime and Megatron one million years before they arrive on Earth.

=== Transportopia ===
At TechWeek LA, Dille unveiled Transportopia, which he describes as turning the entire city of Los Angeles into a massively-multiplayer online game as an attempt to change our relation to the city and "move us outside of our bubbles."

=== Other projects ===
Dille co-wrote and co-executive produced Dimension's 2005 horror film Venom.

Dille also taught an Alternate Reality Game Design class at UCLA film school, Winter Semester 2011.

== Tabletop games ==
- Sagard (1985–1986): the Barbarian Interactive Gamebook series with E. Gary Gygax

== Screenwriting ==
- television series head writer denoted in bold

=== Video games ===
- Surgical Strike (1994)
- Terror T.R.A.X.: Track of the Vampire (1995)
- Soviet Strike (1996)
- Nuclear Strike (1997)
- Army Men: Sarge's Heroes (1999)
- Tomorrow Never Dies (1999)
- Citizen X (2002)
- Dead to Rights (2002)
- Fire Blade (2002)
- Batman: Rise of Sin Tzu (2003)
- Mission: Impossible – Operation Surma (2003)
- The Chronicles of Riddick: Escape from Butcher Bay (2004)
- Constantine (2005)
- Scooby-Doo! Unmasked (2005)
- Teen Titans (2005)
- Avatar: The Last Airbender (2006)
- Superman Returns (2006)
- Fantastic Four: Rise of the Silver Surfer (2007)
- Transformers: The Game (2007)
- The Chronicles of Riddick: Assault on Dark Athena (2009)
- Ghostbusters: The Video Game (2009)
- Wheelman (2009)

=== Television ===
- The Puppy's Further Adventures (1983)
- Mister T (1983)
- Robo Force: The Revenge of Nazgar (1984)
- Bigfoot and the Muscle Machines (1985)
- G.I. Joe: A Real American Hero (1985-1986)
- **The Transformers** (1985-1987): season 3 head writer
- Inhumanoids (1986)
- Garbage Pail Kids (1987)
- **Visionaries: Knights of the Magical Light** (1987)
- G.I. Joe: A Real American Hero (1990)
- **Attack of the Killer Tomatoes** (1991): season 2 head writer
- Stunt Dawgs (1992)
- Transformers: Generation 2 (1993)

=== Films ===
- The Transformers: The Movie (1986)
- An American Tail: Fievel Goes West (1991)
- Venom (2005)
- Starship Troopers: Invasion (2012)

=== Transformers web shorts (2021) ===
- Discontinued? What do you mean I'm being discontinued?
- Are you kidding me?! You dropped the Matrix!
- 10,000 pardons, but you mean Bombshell, right?
- Who else had a Quintesson space loogie on their bingo card?
- Sharkticons, good at more than just chomping!
- It sucks getting old...am I right?

== Critical reception ==
Regarding Dille's script for Fievel Goes West, critic Cliff Terry wrote, "Screenwriter Flint Dille has provided a story that is frenetic and fast-paced—in the end, too hyper, too cluttered—with some decidedly dark touches that, conceivably, could have undertones of the Holocaust. To lighten things up, Dille periodically tosses in bits of relatively sophisticated humor. At one point, the desert is described as 'a million-acre catbox,' there are references to espresso and endive, and when Miss Kitty cuts out on Tiger, she purrs—Casablanca-like: 'We'll always have the Bronx.'"

== Published works ==
- Dille, Flint; Platten, John Zuur (2008). The Ultimate Guide to Video Game Writing and Design. Los Angeles, CA: Lone Eagle. ISBN 978-1-58065-066-3.
- Dille, Flint (2020). The Gamesmaster: My Life in the '80s Geek Culture Trenches with G.I. Joe, Dungeons & Dragons, and The Transformers. Los Angeles, CA: Rare Bird Books, A Vireo Book. ISBN 1644280124.
