= Classic Warfare =

Wargame written by Gary Gygax

- Designers: Gary Gygax
- Illustrators: Greg Bell
- Publishers: TSR
- Publication: 1975
- Genres: Miniature wargaming, ancient/medieval era

Classic Warfare: Rules for Ancient Warfare from the Pharaohs to Charlemagne is a wargame written by Gary Gygax and published by TSR in 1975. It was a set of miniature rules originally developed for International Federation of Wargaming fanzine in 1969 to 1970 in eight installments.

== Description ==
Classic Warfare is a 68-page ring bound book. It covers the Ancient Period: from 1500 BC to 500 AD, and utilizes miniatures at 1:30 ratio. In the April 1976 issue of the Strategic Review, Gygax dedicated two articles, one for medieval flag symbols and one for missile weapon range, to be used in conjunction with the rule-set.

David M. Ewalt, in his book Of Dice and Men, called the game "a set of Gygax-authored rules for reenacting battles 'from the Pharaohs to Charlemagne.'"

== Reviews ==
- Dragon issue #001, June 1976
- Don Lowry, in Panzerfaust and Campaign #73 (May/June 1976).
