= Saga of Old City =

1985 novel by Gary Gygax

- Cover of the book
- Author: Gary Gygax
- Cover artist: Clyde Caldwell
- Language: English
- Series: Gord the Rogue
- Genre: Fantasy
- Publisher: TSR, Inc.
- Publication date: 1985
- Publication place: United States
- Media type: Print (Paperback)
- Followed by: Artifact of Evil

Saga of Old City is a 1985 fantasy novel by Gary Gygax, set in the world of Greyhawk, which is based on the Dungeons & Dragons fantasy role-playing game.

== Plot summary ==
Saga of Old City was the first novel to feature Gord the Rogue. Saga of Old City starts in Gord's childhood, and ends with his triumphant return to Greyhawk City as a young man and master thief. He learns his trade in the 'beggars' guild', and gets involved in the gang war touched off by the beggars encroaching on the official thieves' guild's territory. He travels and has a variety of swashbuckling adventures, ranging from participating in a war, to liberating a young noblewoman held hostage, to defeating a demon with a druid, Curley Greenleaf, and a barbarian, Chert.

== Publication history ==
Gary Gygax wrote a short story, "At Moonset Blackcat Comes", that appeared in the special 100th issue of Dragon in August 1985. This introduced Gord the Rogue to gamers just before Saga of Old City was scheduled to be released. Saga of the Old City was published in 1985; this and its sequel Artifact of Evil were the only two novels published under TSR's Greyhawk Adventures written by Gygax.

This was Gygax's first novel, and it was edited by Kim Mohan. It was the first Greyhawk novel released by TSR. It was not the first published novel to take place in this world; the first novel to feature Greyhawk was Quag Keep, published in 1978 by Andre Norton.

In 2008, Troll Lord Games released a new hard cover reprinting of Saga of Old City.

== Reception ==
Saga of Old City appeared at #16 on the 2024 Game Rant "31 Best Dungeons & Dragons Novels, Ranked" list.

In the Io9 series revisiting older Dungeons & Dragons novels, Rob Bricken commented that "I feel very weird about hating a novel written by the father of Dungeons & Dragons, but there's nothing fantastic about the fantasy in Saga of Old City [...] technically not a critical miss, but still an utter failure."
