= Role-Playing Mastery =

Role-playing game book

Role-Playing Mastery is a book about tabletop role-playing games by Gary Gygax.

== Summary ==
Role-Playing Mastery, published in 1987 by TarcherPerigee, is a book about role-playing games that presents tactics and strategies, as well as procedures used during play, and also goes into detail on how game systems are constructed.

== Reception ==
In the December 1987 edition of Dragon (Issue #128), John Bunnell (co-founder of Dragon Con) pointed out an immediate dichotomy: Gygax wrote in his preface that his focus would be on educating inexperienced players, but two pages later that his audience was "role-playing enthusiasts". Bunnell found the rest of the book was similarly thematically divided, and called Gygax's approach "schizophrenic". Bunnell also found that although Gygax states several times the need to broaden the appeal of RPGs to newcomers, "his real thrust is almost precisely the opposite... Essentially, Gygax is making the assumption that gaming can only be appreciated by an elite group of 'masters'... That attitude is one the gaming community should not be promoting under any circumstance." Bunnell concluded by giving the book a qualified recommendation, saying, "there is still a good deal of valuable insight to be had within the pages of Gary Gygax’s book. Gamers who read it carefully will be able to appreciate some of that wisdom, and novices may be able to glean some as well, if provided with sufficient cautions against treating the tome as gospel. Without those warnings, though, Role-Playing Mastery seems likely to drive away more prospective gamers than it manages to recruit."

In the October-November 1988 edition of Space Gamer/Fantasy Gamer (Issue 83), Christopher Earley recommended the book for players new to role-playing games, saying, "If [...] you are new to the community of role-playing and would like to better grasp both the general concept of role-playing and the skills required to play, Role-Playing Mastery is a worthwhile and recommended reading, written by the (undeniably) biggest name in the role-playing community."

In a retrospective review of Role-Playing Mastery in Black Gate, Bob Byrne said "If you played Dungeons and Dragons before third edition, I think you should really give this book a read. You'll find much to think about. And for you relative newcomers, you can get a look into a very different mindset. Either way, it's the guy who co-created the game talking about how he thought you could become an expert at it."
