= Legion of Gold =

Tabletop role-playing game adventure

- Designers: Gary Gygax
- Publishers: TSR
- Publication: 1981; 45 years ago

Legion of Gold is a 1981 role-playing game adventure for Gamma World written by Gary Gygax, and published by TSR.

== Plot summary ==
Legion of Gold is an adventure involving a small army of glowing golden warriors laying waste to the area surrounding the Great Lake Mitchigoom.

== Reception ==
William A. Barton reviewed Legion of Gold in The Space Gamer No. 41. Barton commented that "Legion of Gold is a worthy effort and can easily stand with the best of TSR's D&D modules. It should make Gamma World fans more excited about the game and may even draw some who have been less enthusiastic to give it a try as well."
