= Warriors of Mars (game) =

1974 miniatures wargame rule book

Warriors of Mars is a 1974 miniatures wargame rule book, written by Gary Gygax and Brian Blume and published by Tactical Studies Rules. It simulates combat in the fantasy world of Barsoom, originally imagined by Edgar Rice Burroughs in his series of novels about John Carter of Mars. It is a 56-page booklet in the same style as the original Dungeons & Dragons books, even sharing the same artist Greg Bell. Gygax and TSR published the rules without permission from Burroughs estate and soon after its release they issued a cease and desist order and the game was pulled from distribution. Because only a few copies were sold the book is now rare and sells for a high price.

The same year Warriors of Mars was published (and then un-published), Gygax published the first edition of Dungeons & Dragons, where he paid homage to Burroughs in the last paragraph of the "Preface":

Those wargamers who lack imagination, those who don't care for Burroughs' Martian adventures where John Carter is groping through black pits... will not be likely to find Dungeons and Dragons to their taste.
