= Dangerous Journeys =

Role-playing game

- Cover of Mythus
- Designers: Gary Gygax
- Publishers: Game Designers' Workshop
- Publication: 1992
- Genres: Fantasy
- Systems: Custom

Dangerous Journeys was a roleplaying game created by Gary Gygax, the cocreator of the original Dungeons & Dragons system. The game was originally announced as Dangerous Dimensions but was changed to Dangerous Journeys in response to a threat of a lawsuit from TSR, Inc., the publishers of Dungeons and Dragons, and the company Gygax had cofounded, over objections that the "DD" abbreviation would be too similar to "D&D."

Created after his departure from TSR, the publication of this series of books by Game Designers' Workshop was met with lawsuits by TSR, which ultimately saw the production of the game system cease.

The design of the game system addressed many of the perceived flaws and limitations of the older AD&D game system, such as a lack of a skill system and rigid, class-based restrictions on weapons. According to a FAQ on the official Gary Gygax website, the Mythus Fantasy setting for Dangerous Journeys was one of several settings planned for the system.

Several books were produced for the line:

- Mythus, the core rulebook
- Mythus Magick, a compendium of spells and magick items
- The Epic of Aerth, a campaign world book
- Necropolis and the Land of Aegypt, a setting book and adventure module
- Mythus Bestiary - a book of creature and monster statistics, concentrating on animals and beasts both mundane and weird
- Mythus Game Master's Screen, a GM screen and book of charts
- Mythus Prime, a simplified and streamlined version of the Mythus rules

At least one additional game in the Dangerous Journeys series was planned but never published:

- Unhallowed, a game of supernatural horror
- The City of Ascalon, a second setting book was advertised. Ascalon was later published as a standalone RPG product in 2023 by FGG Games, LLC.

Electronic Arts began to develop a video game version, but it was never completed.

== Reviews ==
- Casus Belli #72 (Nov 1992)
