= Gary Gygax =

American game designer and author (1938–2008)

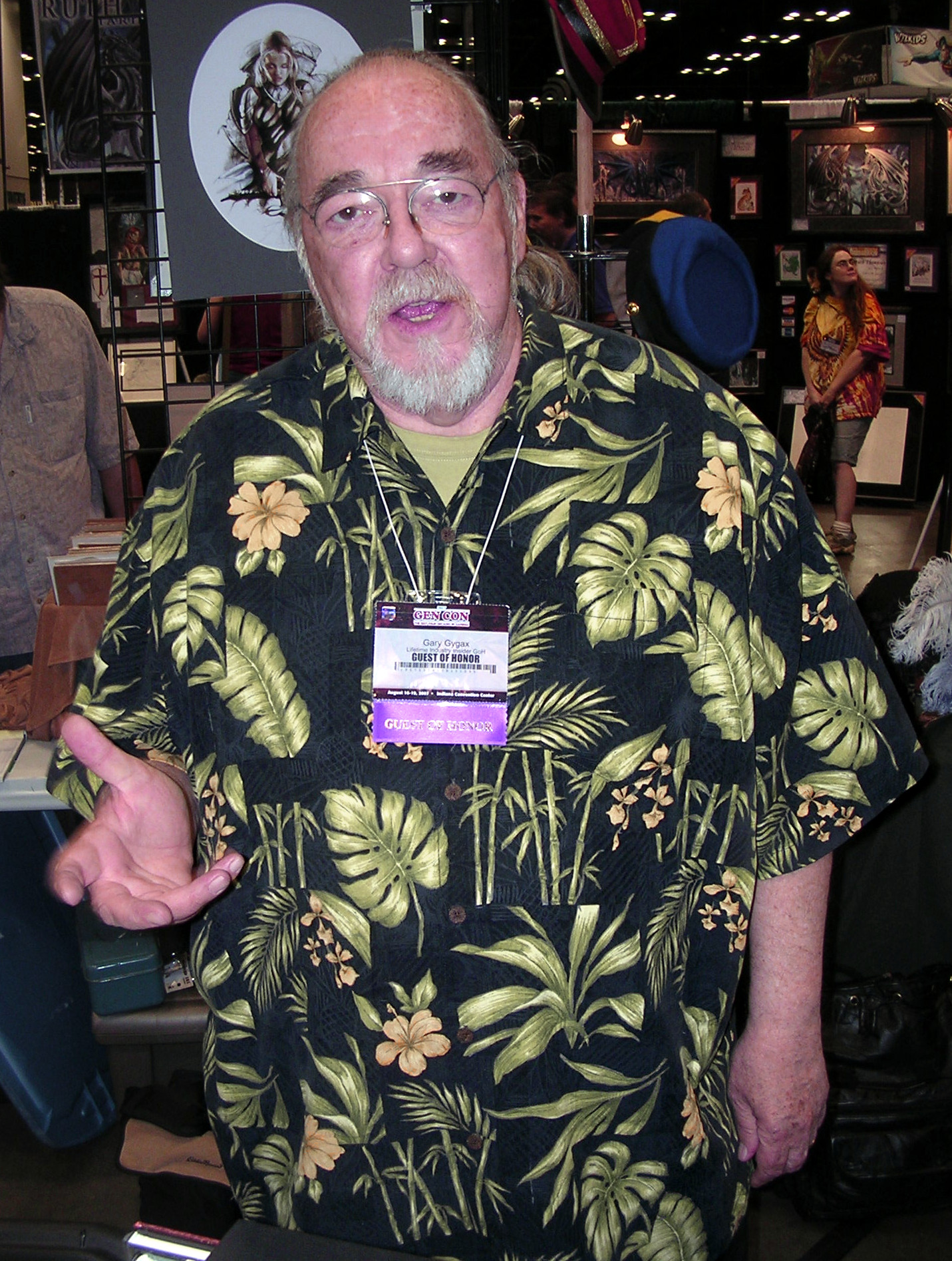
- Gygax at Gen Con Indy 2007
- Born: Ernest Gary Gygax; July 27, 1938; Chicago, Illinois, U.S.
- Died: March 4, 2008 (aged 69); Lake Geneva, Wisconsin, U.S.
- Resting place: Oak Hill Cemetery (Lake Geneva, Wisconsin)
- Occupations: Writer, game designer
- Spouses: Mary Jo Powell (m. 1958; div. 1983) Gail Carpenter (m. 1987)
- Children: 5
- Writing career
- Period: 1971–2008
- Genres: Role-playing games, fantasy, wargames

Signature
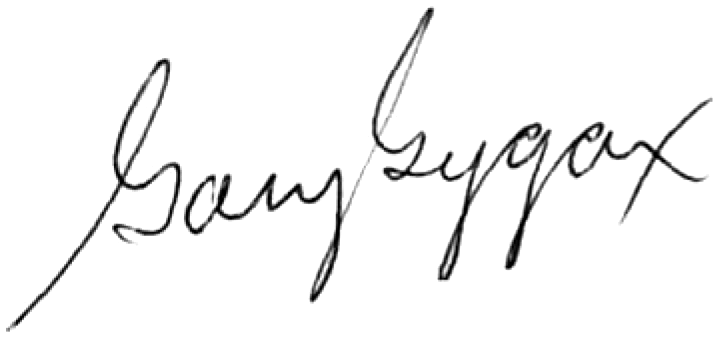

Ernest Gary Gygax (/ˈɡaɪɡæks/ GHY-gaks; July 27, 1938 – March 4, 2008) was an American game designer and author best known for co-creating the pioneering tabletop role-playing game Dungeons & Dragons (D&D) with Dave Arneson.

In the 1960s, Gygax created an organization of wargaming clubs and founded the Gen Con tabletop game convention. In 1971, he co-developed Chainmail, a miniatures wargame based on medieval warfare with Jeff Perren. He co-founded the company TSR (originally Tactical Studies Rules) with childhood friend Don Kaye in 1973. The next year, TSR published D&D, created by Gygax and Arneson the year before. In 1976, he founded The Dragon, a magazine based around the new game. In 1977, he began developing a more comprehensive version of the game called Advanced Dungeons & Dragons. He designed numerous manuals for the game system, as well as several pre-packaged adventures called "modules" that gave a person running a D&D game (the "Dungeon Master") a rough script and ideas. In 1983, he worked to license the D&D product line into the successful D&D cartoon series.

Gygax left TSR in 1986 over conflicts with its new majority owner, but he continued to create role-playing game titles independently, beginning with the multi-genre Dangerous Journeys in 1992. He designed the Lejendary Adventure gaming system, released in 1999. In 2005, he was involved in the Castles & Crusades role-playing game, which was conceived as a hybrid between the third edition of D&D and the original version of the game.

In 2004, he had two strokes and narrowly avoided a subsequent heart attack. He was diagnosed with an abdominal aortic aneurysm and died in March 2008 at age 69. Following Gygax's funeral, many mourners formed an impromptu game event which became known as Gary Con 0, and gamers celebrate in Lake Geneva each March with a large role-playing game convention in Gygax's honor.

== Early life and inspiration ==
Gygax was born in Chicago, the son of Almina Emelie "Posey" Burdick and Swiss immigrant and former Chicago Symphony Orchestra violinist Ernst Gygax. He was named Ernest after his father, but was commonly known as Gary, the middle name given to him by his mother after the actor Gary Cooper. The family lived on Kenmore Avenue, close enough to Wrigley Field that he could hear the roar of the crowds watching the Chicago Cubs play. At age 7, he became a member of a small group of friends who called themselves the "Kenmore Pirates". In 1946, after the Kenmore Pirates were involved in a fracas with another gang of boys, his father decided to move the family to Posey's family home in Lake Geneva, Wisconsin, where Posey's family had settled in the early 19th century, and where Gary's grandparents still lived.

In this new setting, Gygax soon made friends with several of his peers, including Don Kaye and Mary Jo Powell. During his childhood and teen years, he developed a love of games and an appreciation for fantasy and science fiction literature. When he was five, he played card games such as pinochle and then board games such as chess. At age ten, he and his friends played the sort of make-believe games that eventually came to be called "live action role-playing games", with one of them acting as referee. His father introduced him to science fiction and fantasy through pulp novels. His interest in games, combined with an appreciation of history, eventually led Gygax to begin playing miniature war games in 1953 with his best friend, Don Kaye. As teenagers, Gygax and Kaye designed their own miniatures rules for toy soldiers with a large collection of 54 mm and 70 mm figures, where they used "ladyfingers" (small firecrackers) to simulate explosions.

By his teens, Gygax had a voracious appetite for pulp fiction authors such as Robert E. Howard, Jack Vance, Fritz Leiber, H. P. Lovecraft, and Edgar Rice Burroughs. He was a mediocre student, and in 1956, a few months after his father died, he dropped out of high school in his junior year. He joined the Marines, but after being diagnosed with walking pneumonia, he received a medical discharge and moved back home with his mother. From there, he commuted to a job as a shipping clerk with Kemper Insurance Co. in Chicago. Shortly after his return, a friend introduced him to Avalon Hill's new wargame Gettysburg. Gygax was soon obsessed with the game, often playing marathon sessions once or more a week. It was also from Avalon Hill that he ordered the first blank hex mapping sheets available, which he then employed to design his own games.

About the same time that he discovered Gettysburg, his mother reintroduced him to Mary Jo Powell, who had left Lake Geneva as a child and just returned. Gygax was smitten with her and, after a short courtship, persuaded her to marry him, despite being only 19. This caused some friction with Kaye, who had also been wooing Mary Jo. Kaye refused to attend Gygax's wedding. Kaye and Gygax reconciled after the wedding.

The couple moved to Chicago where Gygax continued as a shipping clerk at Kemper Insurance. He found a job for Mary Jo there, but the company laid her off when she became pregnant with their first child. He also took anthropology classes at the University of Chicago.

Despite his commitments to his job, raising a family, and attending college, Gygax continued to play wargames. It reached the point that Mary Jo, pregnant with their second child, believed he was having an affair and confronted him in a friend's basement only to discover him and his friends sitting around a map-covered table.

In 1962, Gygax got a job as an insurance underwriter at Fireman's Fund Insurance Co. His family continued to grow, and after his third child was born, he decided to move his family back to Lake Geneva. Except for a few months he spent in Clinton, Wisconsin, after his divorce, and his time in Hollywood while he was the head of TSR's entertainment division, Lake Geneva was his home for the rest of his life.

By 1966, Gygax was active in the wargame hobby world and was writing many magazine articles on the subject. He learned about H. G. Wells's Little Wars book for play of military miniatures wargames and Fletcher Pratt's Naval Wargame book. Gygax later looked for innovative ways to generate random numbers, and used not only common six-sided dice, but dice of all five Platonic solid shapes, which he discovered in a school supply catalog.

Gygax cited as influences the fantasy and science fiction authors Robert E. Howard, L. Sprague de Camp, Jack Vance, Fletcher Pratt, Fritz Leiber, Poul Anderson, A. Merritt, and H. P. Lovecraft.

== Wargames ==
In 1967, Gygax co-founded the International Federation of Wargamers (IFW) with Bill Speer and Scott Duncan. The IFW grew rapidly, particularly by assimilating several preexisting wargaming clubs, and aimed to promote interest in wargames of all periods. It provided a forum for wargamers via its newsletters and societies, which enabled them to form local groups and share rules. In 1967, Gygax organized a 20-person gaming meet in the basement of his home; this event was later called "Gen Con 0". In 1968, he rented Lake Geneva's vine-covered Horticultural Hall for $50 (equivalent to $460 in 2025) to hold the first Lake Geneva Convention, also known as the Gen Con gaming convention. Gen Con is now one of North America's largest annual hobby-game gatherings. Gygax met Dave Arneson, the future co-creator of D&D, at the second Gen Con in August 1969.

I'm very fond of the Medieval period, the Dark Ages in particular. We started playing in the period because I had found appropriate miniatures. I started devising rules where what the plastic figure was wearing was what he had. If he had a shield and no armor, then he just has a shield. Shields and half-armor = half-armor rules; full-armor figure = full armor rules. I did rules for weapons as well.

— Gary Gygax

Together with Don Kaye, Mike Reese, and Leon Tucker, Gygax created a military miniatures society called Lake Geneva Tactical Studies Association (LGTSA) in 1970, with its first headquarters in Gygax's basement. Shortly thereafter in 1970, Gygax and Robert Kuntz founded the Castle & Crusade Society of the IFW.

In October 1970, Gygax lost his job at the insurance company after almost nine years. Unemployed and now with five children he tried to use his enthusiasm for games to make a living by designing board games for commercial sale. This proved unsustainable when he grossed only $882 in 1971 (equivalent to $7,012 in 2025). He began cobbling shoes in his basement, which provided him with a steady income and gave him more time for game development. In 1971, he began doing some editing work at Guidon Games, a publisher of wargames, for which he produced the board games Alexander the Great and Dunkirk: The Battle of France. Early that same year, Gygax published Chainmail, a miniatures wargame that simulated medieval-era tactical combat, which he had originally written with hobby-shop owner Jeff Perren. The Chainmail medieval miniatures rules were originally published in the Castle & Crusade Society's fanzine The Domesday Book. Guidon Games hired Gygax to produce a game series called "Wargaming with Miniatures", with the initial release for the series being a new edition of Chainmail (1971). The first edition of Chainmail included a fantasy supplement to the rules. These comprised a system for warriors, wizards, and various monsters of nonhuman races drawn from the works of J. R. R. Tolkien and other sources. For a small publisher like Guidon Games, Chainmail was relatively successful, selling 100 copies per month.

Gygax also collaborated on Tractics with Mike Reese and Leon Tucker, his contribution being the change to a 20-sided spinner or a coffee can with 20 numbered poker chips (eventually, 20-sided dice) to decide combat resolutions instead of the standard six-sided dice. He also collaborated with Arneson on the Napoleonic naval wargame Don't Give Up the Ship!

Dave Arneson briefly adapted the Chainmail rules for his fantasy Blackmoor campaign. In the winter of 1972–1973, Arneson and friend David Megarry, inventor of the Dungeon! board game, traveled to Lake Geneva to showcase their respective games to Gygax, in his role as a representative of Guidon Games. Gygax saw potential in both games, and was especially excited by Arneson's role-playing game. Gygax and Arneson immediately started to collaborate on creating "The Fantasy Game", the role-playing game that evolved into Dungeons & Dragons.

Following Arneson's Blackmoor demonstration, Gygax requested more information from Arneson and began testing ideas for the game on his two oldest children, Ernie and Elise, in a setting he called "Greyhawk". This group rapidly expanded to include Kaye, Kuntz, and eventually a large circle of players. Gygax and Arneson continued to trade notes about their respective campaigns as Gygax began work on a draft. Several aspects of the system governing magic in the game were inspired by fantasy author Jack Vance's The Dying Earth stories (notably that magic-users in the game forget the spells that they have learned immediately upon casting them and must re-study them in order to cast them again), and the system as a whole drew upon the work of authors such as Robert E. Howard, L. Sprague de Camp, Michael Moorcock, Roger Zelazny, Poul Anderson, Tolkien, Bram Stoker, and others. The final draft contained changes not vetted by Arneson, and Gygax's vision differed on some rule details Arneson had preferred.

Gygax asked Guidon Games to publish it, but the three-volume rule set in a labeled box was beyond the small publisher's scope. Gygax pitched the game to Avalon Hill, but it did not understand the concept of role-playing and turned down his offer.

By 1974, Gygax's Greyhawk group, which had started off with himself, Ernie Gygax, Don Kaye, Rob Kuntz, and Terry Kuntz, had grown to over 20 people, with Rob Kuntz operating as co-dungeon-master so that each of them could referee smaller groups of about a dozen players.

== TSR ==
Gygax left Guidon Games in 1973 and in October, with Don Kaye as a partner, founded Tactical Studies Rules. The two men each invested $1,000 in the venture—Kaye borrowed his share on his life insurance policy—to print a thousand copies of the Dungeons & Dragons boxed set. They also tried to raise money by immediately publishing a set of wargame rules called Cavaliers and Roundheads, but sales were poor; when the printing costs for the thousand copies of Dungeons & Dragons rose from $2,000 to $2,500, they still did not have enough capital to publish it. Worried that the other playtesters and wargamers now familiar with Gygax's rules would bring a similar product to the market first, the two accepted an offer in December 1973 from gaming acquaintance Brian Blume to invest $2,000 in TSR to become an equal one-third partner. (Gygax accepted Blume's offer right away. Kaye was less enthusiastic, and after a week to consider the offer, he questioned Blume closely before acquiescing.) Blume's investment finally brought the financing that enabled them to publish D&D. Gygax worked on rules for more miniatures and tabletop battle games including Classic Warfare (Ancient Period: 1500 BC to 500 AD) and Warriors of Mars.

TSR released the first commercial version of D&D in January 1974 as a boxed set. The hand-assembled print run of 1,000 copies, put together in Gygax's home, sold out in less than a year. (In 2018, a first printing of the boxed set sold at auction for more than $20,000.)

At the end of 1974, with sales of D&D skyrocketing, the future looked bright for Gygax and Kaye, who were only 36. But in January 1975, Kaye unexpectedly died of a heart attack. He had not made any specific provision in his will regarding his share of the company, simply leaving his entire estate to his wife Donna. Although she had worked briefly for TSR as an accountant, she did not share her husband's enthusiasm for gaming, and made clear that she would not have anything to do with managing the company. Gygax called her "less than personable... After Don died she dumped all the Tactical Studies Rules materials off on my front porch. It would have been impossible to manage a business with her involved as a partner." Gygax relocated TSR from the Kaye dining room to the basement at his own house. In July 1975, Gygax and Blume reorganized their company from a partnership to a corporation called TSR Hobbies. Gygax owned 150 shares, Blume the other 100 shares, and both had the option to buy up to 700 shares at any time in the future. But TSR Hobbies had nothing to publish—D&D was still owned by the three-way partnership of TSR, and neither Gygax nor Blume had the money to buy out Donna Kaye's shares. Blume persuaded a reluctant Gygax to allow his father, Melvin Blume, to buy Donna's shares, and those were converted to 200 shares in TSR Hobbies. In addition, Brian bought another 140 shares. These purchases reduced Gygax from majority shareholder in control of the company to minority shareholder; he effectively became the Blumes' employee.

Gygax wrote the supplements Greyhawk, Eldritch Wizardry, and Swords & Spells for the original D&D game. With Brian Blume, he also designed the wild west-oriented role-playing game Boot Hill. The same year, Gygax created the magazine The Strategic Review with himself as editor. But wanting a more industry-wide periodical, he hired Tim Kask as TSR's first employee to change this magazine to the fantasy periodical The Dragon, with Gygax as writer, columnist, and publisher (from 1978 to 1981). The Dragon debuted in June 1976, and Gygax said of its success years later: "When I decided that The Strategic Review was not the right vehicle, hired Tim Kask as a magazine editor for Tactical Studies Rules, and named the new publication he was to produce The Dragon, I thought we would eventually have a great periodical to serve gaming enthusiasts worldwide ... At no time did I ever contemplate so great a success or so long a lifespan."

TSR moved out from the Gygax house in 1976 into the first professional location it could call home, known as "The Dungeon Hobby Shop". Arneson was hired as part of the creative staff, but was let go after only ten months, another sign that Gygax and Arneson had creative differences over D&D.

=== Advanced Dungeons & Dragons and Hollywood ===
The Dungeons & Dragons Basic Set released in 1977 was an introductory version of the original D&D geared toward new players and edited by John Eric Holmes. The same year, TSR Hobbies released Advanced Dungeons & Dragons (AD&D), a completely new and complex version of D&D. The Monster Manual was also released that year and became the first supplemental rule book of the new system, and many more followed. AD&D's rules were not fully compatible with those of the D&D Basic Set, and D&D and AD&D became distinct product lines. Splitting the game lines created a further rift between Gygax and Arneson. Arneson received a ten-percent royalty on sales of all D&D products, but Gygax refused to pay him royalties on AD&D books, claiming that it was a new and different property. In 1979, Arneson sued TSR; they settled in March 1981 with the agreement that Arneson would receive a 2.5-percent royalty on all AD&D products, giving him a six-figure annual income for the next decade.

Gygax wrote the AD&D hardcovers Players Handbook, Dungeon Masters Guide, Monster Manual, and Monster Manual II. He also wrote or co-wrote many AD&D and basic D&D adventure modules, including The Keep on the Borderlands, Tomb of Horrors, Expedition to the Barrier Peaks, The Temple of Elemental Evil, The Forgotten Temple of Tharizdun, Mordenkainen's Fantastic Adventure, Isle of the Ape, and all seven of the modules later combined into Queen of the Spiders. In 1980, Gygax's long-time campaign setting Greyhawk was published in the form of the World of Greyhawk Fantasy World Setting folio, which was expanded in 1983 into the World of Greyhawk Fantasy Game Setting boxed set. Sales of the D&D game reached $8.5 million in 1980. Gygax also provided assistance on the Gamma World science fantasy role-playing game in 1981 and co-authored the Gamma World adventure Legion of Gold.

In 1979, Michigan State University student James Dallas Egbert III allegedly disappeared into the school's steam tunnels while playing a live-action version of D&D. In fact, Egbert was discovered in Louisiana several weeks later, but negative mainstream media attention focused on D&D as the cause. In 1982, Patricia Pulling's son killed himself. Pulling blamed D&D for her son's suicide and formed the organization B.A.D.D. (Bothered About Dungeons & Dragons) to attack the game and TSR. Gygax defended the game on a segment of 60 Minutes that aired in 1985. Death threats started arriving at the TSR office, so he hired a bodyguard. Nevertheless, TSR's annual D&D sales increased in 1982 to $16 million. In January 1983, The New York Times speculated that D&D might become "the great game of the 1980s" in the same manner that Monopoly was emblematic of the Great Depression.

Brian Blume persuaded Gygax to allow Brian's brother Kevin to purchase Melvin Blume's shares. This gave the Blume brothers a controlling interest, and Gygax and the Blumes were increasingly at loggerheads over the company's management by 1981. Gygax's frustrations at work and increased prosperity from his generous royalties brought a number of changes to his personal life. He and Mary Jo had been active members of the local Jehovah's Witnesses, but others in the congregation already felt uneasy about his smoking and drinking; his connection to the "satanic" game D&D caused enough friction that the family finally disassociated themselves from Jehovah's Witnesses. Mary Jo resented the amount of time that her husband spent "playing games"; she had begun to drink excessively, and the couple argued frequently. Gygax had started smoking marijuana when he lost his insurance job in 1970, and he started to use cocaine and had a number of extramarital affairs. In 1983, the two got an acrimonious divorce.

At the same time, the Blumes wanted to get Gygax out of Lake Geneva so that they could manage the company without his "interference", so they split TSR Hobbies into TSR, Inc. and TSR Entertainment, Inc. Gygax became president of TSR Entertainment, Inc., and the Blumes sent him to Hollywood to develop TV and film opportunities. He became co-producer of the licensed D&D cartoon series for CBS, which led its time slot for two years.

Gygax's life continued to unravel on the West Coast, as he rented an immense mansion, increased his cocaine use, and spent time with several young starlets.

=== Leaving TSR ===
Gygax was occupied with getting a movie off the ground in Hollywood, so he had to leave TSR in the hands of Kevin and Brian Blume to oversee its day-to-day operations. He reached an agreement with Orson Welles in 1984 to star in a D&D movie, with John Boorman to act as producer and director. But almost at the same time, he received word that TSR had run into severe financial difficulties, and Kevin Blume was attempting to sell the company for six million dollars.

Gygax immediately discarded his movie ambitions—his D&D movie was never made—and flew back to Lake Geneva. He discovered that industry leader TSR was grossing $30 million, yet it was barely breaking even; it was in fact $1.5 million in debt and teetering on the edge of insolvency. Gygax brought his findings to the five other company directors. He charged that the financial crisis was due to Kevin Blume's mismanagement: excess inventory, overstaffing, too many company cars, and some questionable projects such as dredging up a 19th-century shipwreck. Gygax gained control and produced the new AD&D book Unearthed Arcana and the Greyhawk novel Saga of Old City, featuring a protagonist called Gord the Rogue; both sold well. He also hired company manager Lorraine Williams. She bought the Blumes' shares and replaced Gygax as president and CEO in October 1985, stating that Gygax would make no further creative contributions to TSR. Several of his projects were immediately shelved. Gygax took TSR to court in a bid to block the Blumes' sale of their shares to Williams, but he lost.

Sales of D&D reached $29 million in 1985, but Gygax resigned from all of his positions with TSR in October 1986, and all of his disputes with TSR were settled in December. By the terms of the settlement, he gave up his rights except to Gord the Rogue and to those D&D characters whose names were anagrams or plays on his own name (for example, Yrag and Zagyg).

== After TSR ==
=== 1985–1989: New Infinities Productions, Inc. ===
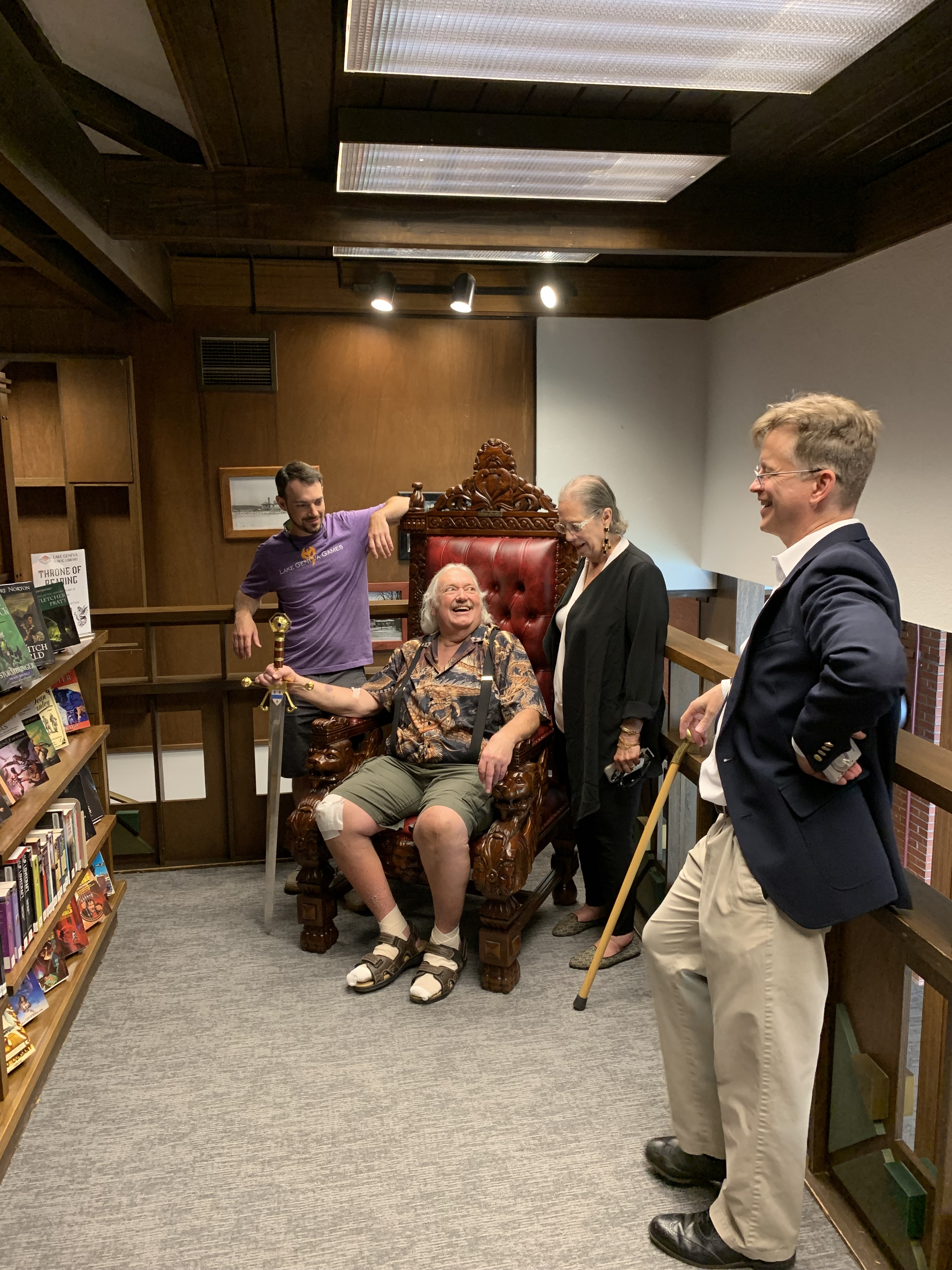
Members of the Gygax family pose on the Throne of Reading at the Lake Geneva Public Library.

Immediately after leaving TSR, Gygax was approached by a wargaming acquaintance, Forrest Baker, who had done some consulting work for TSR in 1983 and 1984. Tired of company management, Gygax was simply looking for a way to market more of his Gord the Rogue novels, but Baker had a vision for a new gaming company. He promised that he would handle the business end while Gygax would handle the creative projects. Baker also guaranteed that, using Gygax's name, he would be able to bring in one to two million dollars of investment. Gygax decided this was a good opportunity, and in October 1986, New Infinities Productions, Inc. (NIPI) was announced publicly. To help him with the creative work, Gygax poached Frank Mentzer and Dragon magazine editor Kim Mohan from TSR. But before a single product was released, Forrest Baker left NIPI when the outside investment he promised of one to two million dollars failed to materialize.

Against his will, Gygax was back in charge again; he immediately looked for a quick product to get NIPI off the ground. He had been able to keep the rights to Gord the Rogue as part of the severance agreement he made with TSR, so he made a new licensing agreement with TSR for the Greyhawk setting and began writing new novels starting with Sea of Death (1987); novel sales were brisk, and Gygax's Gord the Rogue novels kept New Infinities operating.

Gygax brought in Don Turnbull from Games Workshop to manage the company, then worked with Mohan and Mentzer on a science fiction-themed RPG, Cyborg Commando, which was published in 1987. But sales of the new game were not brisk. As game historian Shannon Appelcline noted in 2014, the game was "seen as one of the biggest flops in the industry." Mentzer and Mohan wrote a series of generic RPG adventures, Gary Gygax Presents Fantasy Master, and began working on a third line of products, which began with an adventure written by Mentzer, The Convert (1987). He had written it as an RPGA tournament for D&D, but TSR was not interested in publishing it. Mentzer got verbal permission to publish it with New Infinities, but since the permission was not in writing TSR filed an injunction for a period to prevent the adventure's sale.

During all this drama, Gygax had a romantic relationship with Gail Carpenter, his former assistant at TSR. In November 1986, she gave birth to Gygax's sixth child, Alex. Biographer Michael Witwer believes Alex's birth forced Gygax to reconsider the equation of work, gaming and family that, until this time, had been dominated by work and gaming. "Gary, keenly aware that he had made mistakes as a father and husband in the past, was determined not to make them again ... Gary was also a realist, and knew what good fatherhood would demand, especially at his age." On August 15, 1987, on what would have been his parents' 50th wedding anniversary, Gygax married Carpenter.

During 1987 and 1988, Gygax worked with Flint Dille on the Sagard the Barbarian books, as well as Role-Playing Mastery and its sequel, Master of the Game. He also wrote two more Gord the Rogue novels, City of Hawks (1987), and Come Endless Darkness (1988). But by 1988, TSR had rewritten the setting for the world of Greyhawk, and Gygax was not happy with the new direction in which TSR was taking "his" creation. In a literary declaration that his old world was dead, and wanting to make a clean break with all things Greyhawk, Gygax destroyed his version of Oerth in the final Gord the Rogue novel, Dance of Demons.

With the Gord the Rogue novels finished, NIPI's main source of steady income dried up. The company needed a new product. Gygax announced in 1988 in a company newsletter that he and Rob Kuntz, his co-Dungeon Master during the early days of the Greyhawk campaign, were working as a team again. This time they would create a new multi-genre fantasy role-playing game called "Infinite Adventures", which would receive support through different gamebooks for each genre. This line would explore the original visions of the Castle and City of Greyhawk by Gygax and Kuntz, now called "Castle Dunfalcon". Before work on this project could commence, NIPI ran out of money, was forced into bankruptcy, and dissolved in 1989.

=== 1990–1994: Dangerous Journeys ===
After NIPI folded, Gygax decided to create an entirely new RPG called The Carpenter Project, one considerably more complex and "rules heavy" than his original D&D system, which had encompassed a mere 150 pages. He also wanted to create a horror setting for the new RPG called Unhallowed. He began working on the RPG and the setting with the help of games designer Mike McCulley. Game Designers' Workshop became interested in publishing the new system, and it also drew the attention of JVC and NEC, who were looking for a new RPG system and setting to turn into a series of computer games. NEC and JVC were not interested in horror, however, so they shelved the Unhallowed setting in favor of a fantasy setting called Mythus. JVC also wanted a name change for the RPG, favoring Dangerous Dimensions over The Carpenter Project. Work progressed favorably until March 1992, when TSR filed an injunction against Dangerous Dimensions, claiming that the name and initials were too similar to Dungeons & Dragons. Gygax changed the name to Dangerous Journeys.

The marketing strategy for Dangerous Journeys: Mythus was multi-pronged. The RPG and setting were to be published by Game Designers' Workshop, and the Mythus computer game was being prepared by NEC and JVC. There would also be a series of books based on the Mythus setting written by Gygax. He wrote three novels published by Penguin/Roc and later reprinted by Paizo Publishing: The Anubis Murders, The Samarkand Solution, and Death in Delhi.

In late 1992, the Dangerous Journeys RPG was released by Game Designers' Workshop, but TSR immediately applied for an injunction against the entire Dangerous Journeys RPG and the Mythus setting, arguing that Dangerous Journeys was based on D&D and AD&D. The injunction failed, but TSR moved forward with litigation. Gygax believed that the legal action was without merit and fueled by Lorraine Williams's personal enmity, but NEC and JVC both withdrew from the project, killing the Mythus computer game. By 1994, the legal costs had drained all of Gygax's resources, so he offered to settle. In the end, TSR paid Gygax for the complete rights to Dangerous Journeys and Mythus.

=== 1995–2000: Lejendary Adventures ===
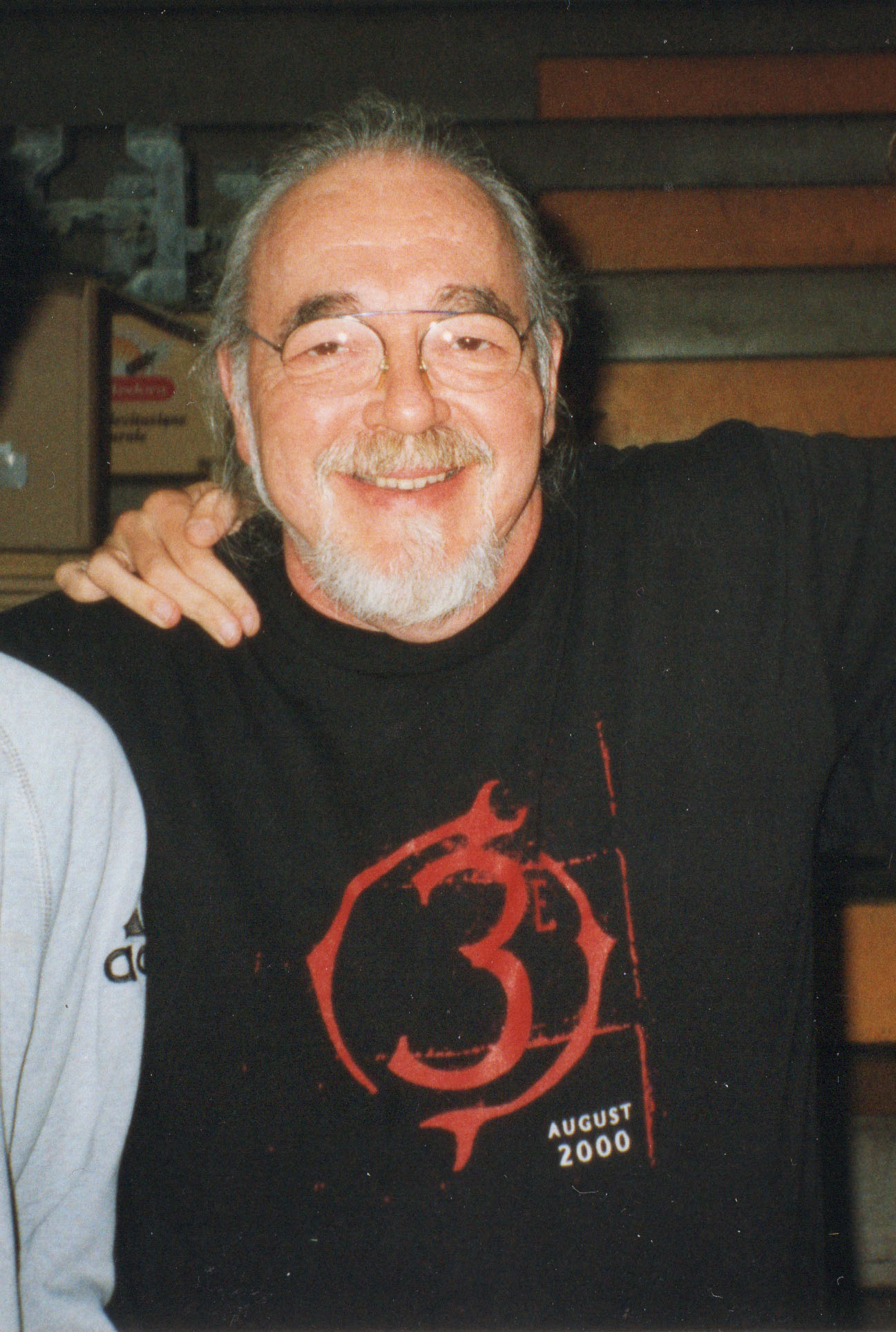
Gary Gygax at ModCon Game Fair in 1999, Modena, Italy. His t-shirt advertises the third edition of D&D, which was to be released the following year.

In 1995, Gygax began work on a new computer role-playing game called Lejendary Adventures. In contrast to the rules-heavy Dangerous Journeys, this new system was a return to simple and basic rules. Although he was not able to successfully release a Lejendary Adventures computer game, Gygax decided to instead publish it as a tabletop game.

Meanwhile, in 1996 the games industry was rocked by the news that TSR had run into insoluble financial problems and had been bought by Wizards of the Coast. While WotC was busy refocusing TSR's products, Christopher Clark of Inner City Games Designs suggested to Gygax in 1997 that they could publish role-playing game adventures that game stores could sell while TSR was otherwise occupied, so Inner City published the fantasy adventures A Challenge of Arms (1998) and The Ritual of the Golden Eyes (1999). Gygax introduced some investors to the publication setup that Clark was using, and although the investors were not willing to fund publication of Legendary Adventures, Clark and Gygax were able to start the partnership Hekaforge Productions. Gygax was thus able to return to publish Lejendary Adventures in 1999. Hekaforge published the game in a three-volume set: The Lejendary Rules for All Players (1999), Lejend Master's Lore (2000) and Beasts of Lejend (2000).

The new owner of TSR, WotC's Peter Adkison, clearly did not harbor any of Lorraine Williams's ill-will toward Gygax: Adkison purchased all of Gygax's residual rights to D&D and AD&D for a six-figure sum. Gygax did not author any new game supplements or novels for TSR or WotC, but he did agree to write the preface to the 1998 adventure Return to the Tomb of Horrors, a paean to Gygax's original AD&D adventure Tomb of Horrors. He also returned to the pages of Dragon Magazine, writing the "Up on a Soapbox" column which was published from Issue #268 (January 2000) to Issue #320 (June 2004).

=== 2000–2008: Later works and death ===
Gygax continued to work on Lejendary Adventures which he believed was his best work. However, sales were below expectation.

Stephen Chenault and Davis Chenault of Troll Lord Games announced on June 11, 2001, that Gygax would be writing supplements for their company. Gygax wrote a hardcover book series for Troll Lord known as "Gygaxian Fantasy Worlds", beginning with The Canting Crew (2002) about the underworld of rogues, and including the game design books World Builder (2003) and Living Fantasy (2003) for various different settings. Gygax wrote the first four books before taking an advisory role on the series, but the series logo continued to carry his name. Troll Lord also published some adventures as a result of their partnership with Gygax, including The Hermit (2002) which was meant to be an adventure for d20 as well as Lejendary Adventures.

Gygax had given an encyclopedic 72,000-word manuscript to Christopher Clark of Hekaforge by 2002 which detailed the setting for the Lejendary Earth, which Clark expanded and split into five books. Hekaforge was only able to publish the first two Lejendary Earth sourcebooks Gazetteer (2002) and Noble Kings and Great Lands (2003), and the small company was having financial difficulties by 2003. Clark got Troll Lord Games to be their "angel" investor and publish the three remaining Lejendary Adventures books.

Necromancer Games announced their plans to publish a d20 version of the adventure Necropolis on October 9, 2001. Gygax had originally intended to release this through New Infinities Productions, but GDW published it in 1992 as an adventure for Mythus; Gary Gygax's Necropolis was published a year later.

Gygax also performed voiceover narration for cartoons and video games. In 2000, he voiced his own cartoon self for an episode of Futurama entitled "Anthology of Interest I" which also included the voices of Al Gore, Stephen Hawking, and Nichelle Nichols. Gygax also performed as a guest Dungeon Master in the Delera's Tomb quest series of the massively multiplayer online role-playing game Dungeons & Dragons Online: Stormreach.

During his time with TSR, Gygax had often mentioned the mysterious Castle Greyhawk which formed the center of his own home campaign, but he had never published details of the castle. In 2003, he announced that he was again partnering with Rob Kuntz to publish the original details of Castle Greyhawk and the City of Greyhawk in six volumes, although the project would use the rules for Castles and Crusades rather than D&D. As Gygax wrote in an on-line forum:

I have laid out a new schematic of castle and dungeon levels based on both my original design of 13 levels plus side adjuncts, and the 'New Greyhawk Castle' that resulted when Rob and I combined our efforts and added a lot of new levels too. From that Rob will draft the level plans for the newest version of the work. Meantime, I am collecting all the most salient feature, encounters, tricks, traps, etc. for inclusion on the various levels. So the end result will be what is essentially the best of our old work in a coherent presentation usable by all DMs, the material having all the known and yet to be discussed features of the original work that are outstanding ... I hope."

Wizards of the Coast had bought TSR in 1997 and still owned the rights to the name "Greyhawk", so Gygax changed the name of Castle Greyhawk to "Castle Zagyg" and also changed the name of the nearby city to "Yggsburgh", a play on his initials "E.G.G."

The scale of the project was enormous. By the time that Gygax and Kuntz had stopped working on their original home campaign, the castle dungeons had encompassed 50 levels of complex passages with thousands of rooms and traps, plus plans for the city of Yggsburgh and encounter areas outside the castle and city. All of this would be too much to fit into the proposed six volumes, so Gygax decided that he would compress the castle dungeons into 13 levels, the size of his original Castle Greyhawk in 1973, by amalgamating the best of what could be gleaned from binders and boxes of old notes. However, neither Gygax nor Kuntz had kept comprehensive plans because they had often made up details of play sessions on the spot. They usually just scribbled a quick map as they played, with cursory notes about monsters, treasures, and traps. These sketchy maps had contained just enough detail that the two could ensure that their independent work would dovetail. All of these old notes now had to be deciphered, 25-year old memories dredged up as to what had happened in each room, and a decision made whether to keep or discard each new piece. Recreating the city too would be a challenge. Gygax still had his old maps of the original city, but all of his previously published work on it was owned by WotC, so he would have to create most of it from scratch while still maintaining the "look and feel" of his original.

Due to creative differences, Kuntz backed out of the project but created an adventure module that would be published at the same time as Gygax's first book. Gygax continued to put Castle Zagyg together on his own, but this came to a complete halt when he had a serious stroke in April 2004 and then another one a few weeks later. He returned to his keyboard after a seven-month convalescence, his output reduced from 14-hour work days to only one or two hours per day. Castle Zagyg Part I: Yggsburgh finally appeared in 2005, the first book in the six-book series. Later that year, Troll Lord Games also published Castle Zagyg: Dark Chateau (2005), the adventure module written for the Yggsburgh setting by Rob Kuntz. Jeff Talanian assisted in creating the dungeon, which was ultimately published in the limited edition release CZ9: The East Marks Gazetteer (2007).

That same year, Gygax was diagnosed with a potentially deadly abdominal aortic aneurysm. Doctors concurred that surgery was needed, but their estimates of success varied from 50-percent to 90-percent. Gygax came to believe that he would likely die on the operating table, and he refused to consider surgery, although he realized that a rupture of the aneurysm would be fatal. In one concession to his condition, he switched from cigarettes, which he had smoked since high school, to cigars.

It was not until 2008 that Gygax was able to finish the second of six volumes entitled Castle Zagyg: The Upper Works, which described details of the castle above ground. The next two volumes were supposed to detail the dungeons beneath Castle Zagyg, but Gygax died in March 2008 before they could be written. His widow Gail had formed the new company Gygax Games, and the company withdrew all of the Gygax licenses from Troll Lord and from Hekaforge three months after he died.

== Personal life ==
Gygax married Mary Jo Powell on September 14, 1958. They had five children together: Ernie (d. 2025), Elise, Heidi, Cindy, and Luke Gygax. They became Jehovah's Witnesses, but he eventually left the religion; he remained a Christian, citing his favorite Bible verses of Matthew 5:15–16 a few months before he died. He divorced Mary Jo in 1983 and married Gail Carpenter, one of his former accountants, on August 15, 1987. Their son, Alex, was born in 1986.

Gygax was an avid hunter and target shooter from an early age with both bow and gun. He collected guns and owned a variety of rifles, shotguns, and handguns at various times. He was a keen supporter of the Chicago Bears. He described himself as a "biological determinist" and believed gaming in general to be a male pursuit, stating in 2004 that "it isn't that females can't play games well, it is just that it isn't a compelling activity to them as is the case for males".

== Awards and honors ==
Immediately after Gygax's 2008 funeral, mourners adjourned to Lake Geneva's American Legion Hall to play games in the deceased's honor. Members of his family served refreshments and played games with friends. This event inspired Luke Gygax to create a locally hosted game event around the date of his father's death. Years later, Gary Con is so well-attended a dozen Lake Geneva hotels must be utilized in order to serve the demand. The funeral day event is now regarded as Gary Con 0.

As the "father of role-playing games", Gygax received many awards, honors, and tributes related to gaming:

- He was inducted into the Academy of Adventure Gaming Arts and Design Origins Award Hall of Fame, also known as the Charles Roberts Awards Hall of Fame, in 1980.
- Sync magazine named Gygax number one on the list of "The 50 Biggest Nerds of All Time".
- SFX magazine listed him as number 37 on the list of the "50 Greatest SF Pioneers".
- In 1999, Pyramid magazine named Gygax as one of "The Millennium's Most Influential Persons" "in the realm of adventure gaming".
- Gygax was tied with J. R. R. Tolkien for number 18 on GameSpy's "30 Most Influential People in Gaming".
- A strain of bacteria was named in honor of Gygax, "Arthronema gygaxiana sp nov UTCC393".
- He was inducted into the Pop Culture Hall of Fame Class of 2019

In 2008 Gail Gygax, the widow of Gary Gygax, began the process to establish a memorial to her late husband in Lake Geneva. On March 28, 2011, the City Council of Lake Geneva, Wisconsin, approved Gail Gygax's application for a site of memorial in Donian Park; however, the Gygax family was unable to raise the money at the time to complete the memorial during a 2012 funding campaign. The design of the monument is a stone castle look with medieval pole arms, a family crest and a dragon.

In 2014, with the approval of Gary's eldest son, Ernie, Epic Quest Publishing started a Kickstarter campaign to raise the initial funding for a museum dedicated to Gary featuring a gaming and event center and hall of fame for authors, artists, designers and game masters.

Lake Geneva mayor Charlene Klein proclaimed July 27, 2023, as "Gary Gygax Day", and on that day dedicated a lakeside park bench in his honor. In her proclamation she reminds residents that in 1983 TSR employed over 400 people, "over 6% of Lake Geneva's population at the time."

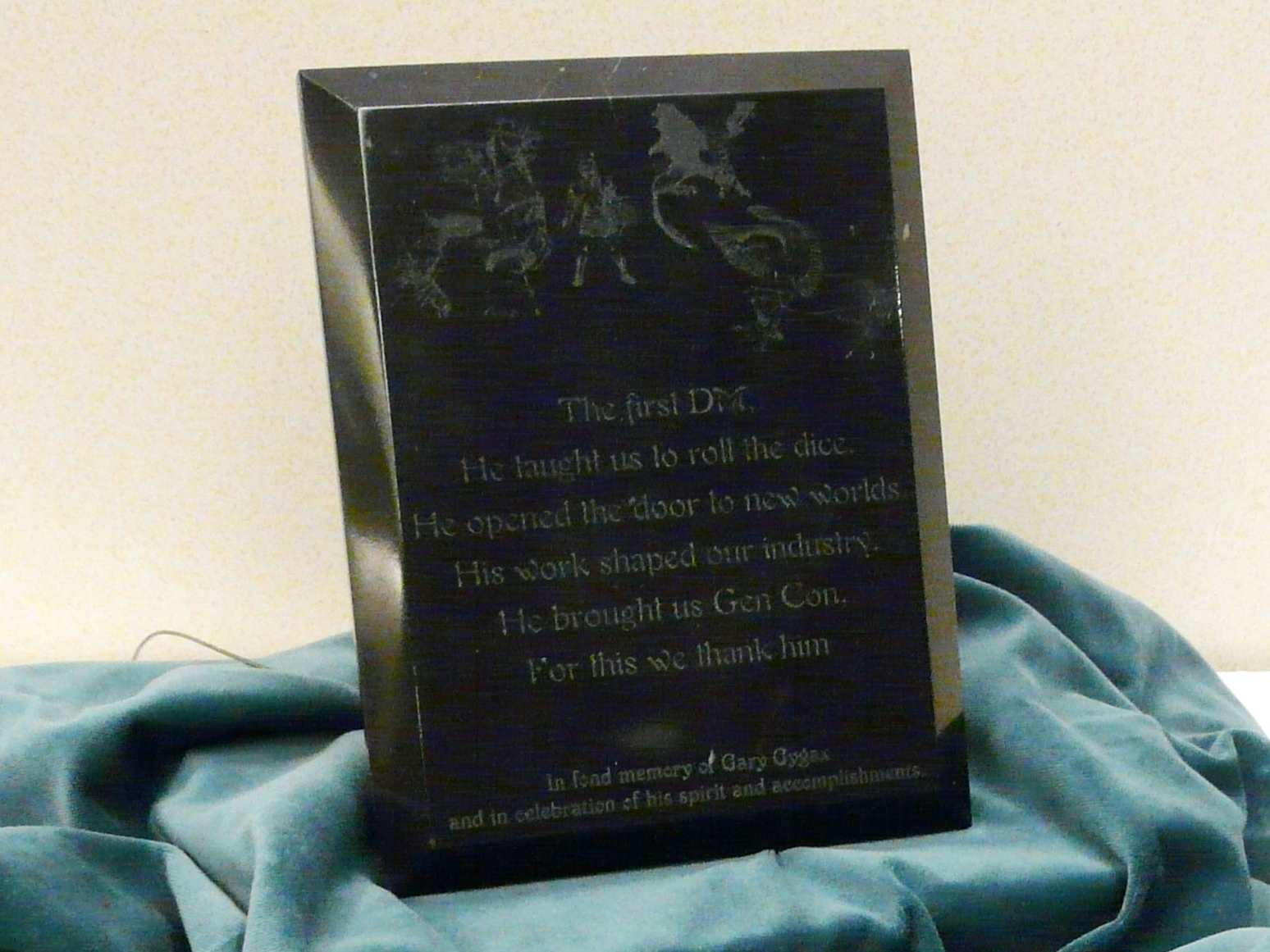
A plaque dedicated to Gary Gygax at Gen Con 2008 reading: "The first DM, He taught us to roll the dice. He opened the door to new worlds. His work shaped our industry. He brought us Gen Con, For this we thank him. In fond memory of Gary Gygax and in celebration of his spirit and accomplishments."

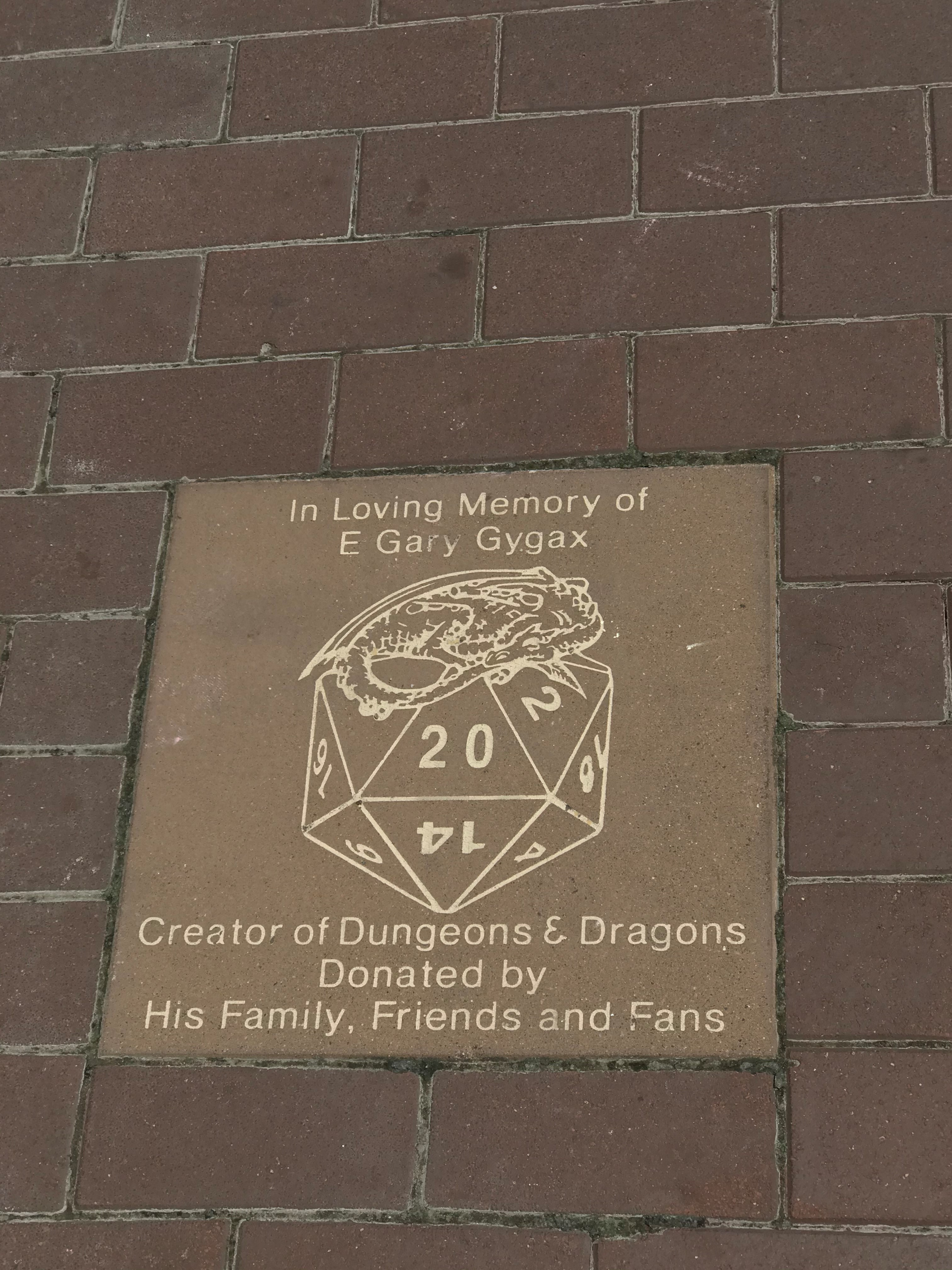
Public memorial to Gary located at the Lake Geneva waterfront erected by his family

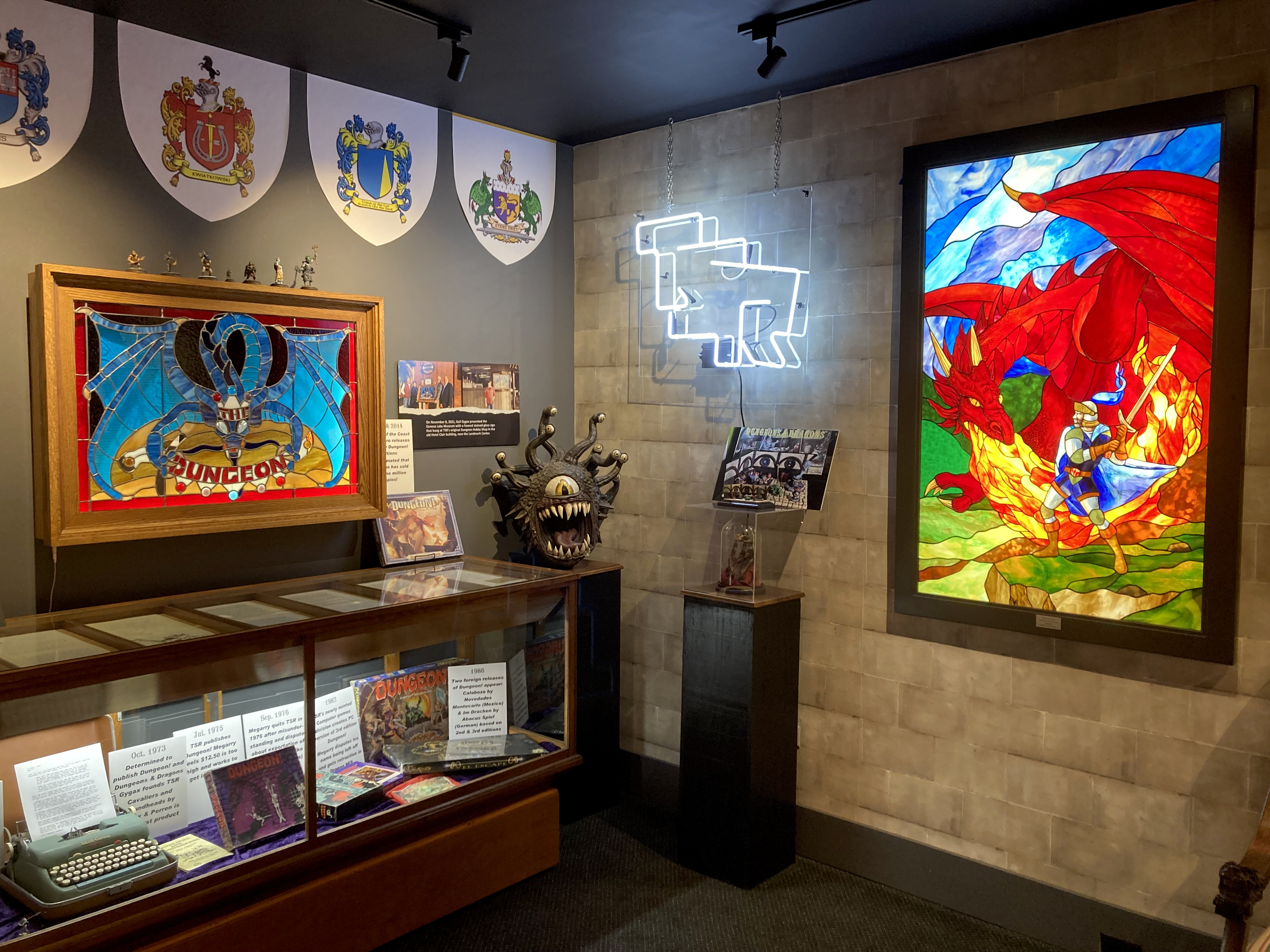
The "Wizard of Lake Geneva" exhibit at the Geneva Lake Museum

== In popular culture ==
In 2000, Gygax voiced his cartoon self for the Futurama episode "Anthology of Interest I", which also included the voices of Al Gore, Stephen Hawking, and Nichelle Nichols. Gygax appeared as his 8-bit self on Code Monkeys in 2007-8. Stephen Colbert, an avid D&D gamer in his youth, dedicated the last part of the March 5, 2008, episode of The Colbert Report to Gygax.

Numerous names in D&D, such as Zagyg, Ring of Gaxx, and Gryrax, are anagrams or alterations of Gygax's name.

== See also ==
- Gary Gygax bibliography
