= New Infinities Productions =

Game company

New Infinities Productions was an American game company that produced role-playing games and game supplements.

== History ==
Immediately after leaving TSR, Gary Gygax helped form New Infinities Productions, Inc. Wargamer and accountant Forrest Baker had worked as a consultant for TSR during 1984 and 1985, and wrote up a business plan that convinced Gygax to try again with the business side of roleplaying; New Infinities was the results, with Baker as CEO and Gygax as chairman of the board. In October 1986, the company was publicly announced. Frank Mentzer and Kim Mohan were design executives and with Gygax formed the creative committee. Before a single product was released, Baker disappeared when his promised outside investment of one to two million dollars failed to come through. In February 1987, Don Turnbull was brought on as the new CEO of New Infinities. Gygax had retained the rights to Gord the Rogue as part of his severance agreement with TSR, so he licensed Greyhawk from TSR and started writing new novels beginning with Sea of Death (1987); Gygax's Gord novels were the main things keeping New Infinities in business. The company's line of action/adventure science fiction was distributed by Berkley Books.

Gygax's first role-playing game work for New Infinities (with Mohan and Mentzer) was the science fiction-themed RPG Cyborg Commando, which was published in 1987. New Infinities began working on a third line of products, which began with an adventure written by Mentzer called The Convert (1987); Mentzer wrote the adventure as an RPGA tournament for D&D, but TSR was not interested in publishing it. Mentzer got verbal permission to publish the adventure with New Infinities, but since the permission was not in writing TSR filed an injunction to prevent the adventure's sale, although the injunction was later lifted. Jefferson P. Swycaffer wrote three books based on Traveller, called the "Tales of the Concordat" trilogy (1988), beginning with The Empire's Legacy and Voyage of the Planetsmasher. Gygax announced in 1988 in a company newsletter that he and Kuntz were working on a new fantasy RPG, and that the company's "Fantasy Master" line would detail the Castle and City of Greyhawk as they had originally envisioned them, now called "Castle Dunfalcon". Gygax and Kuntz's new game would be called "Infinite Adventures", and was envisioned as a multigenre RPG supported by different gamebooks for different genres. However, New Infinities' investors forced the company into bankruptcy, and the company was dissolved in 1989.
