= Horticultural Hall (Lake Geneva, Wisconsin) =

- U.S. National Register of Historic Places
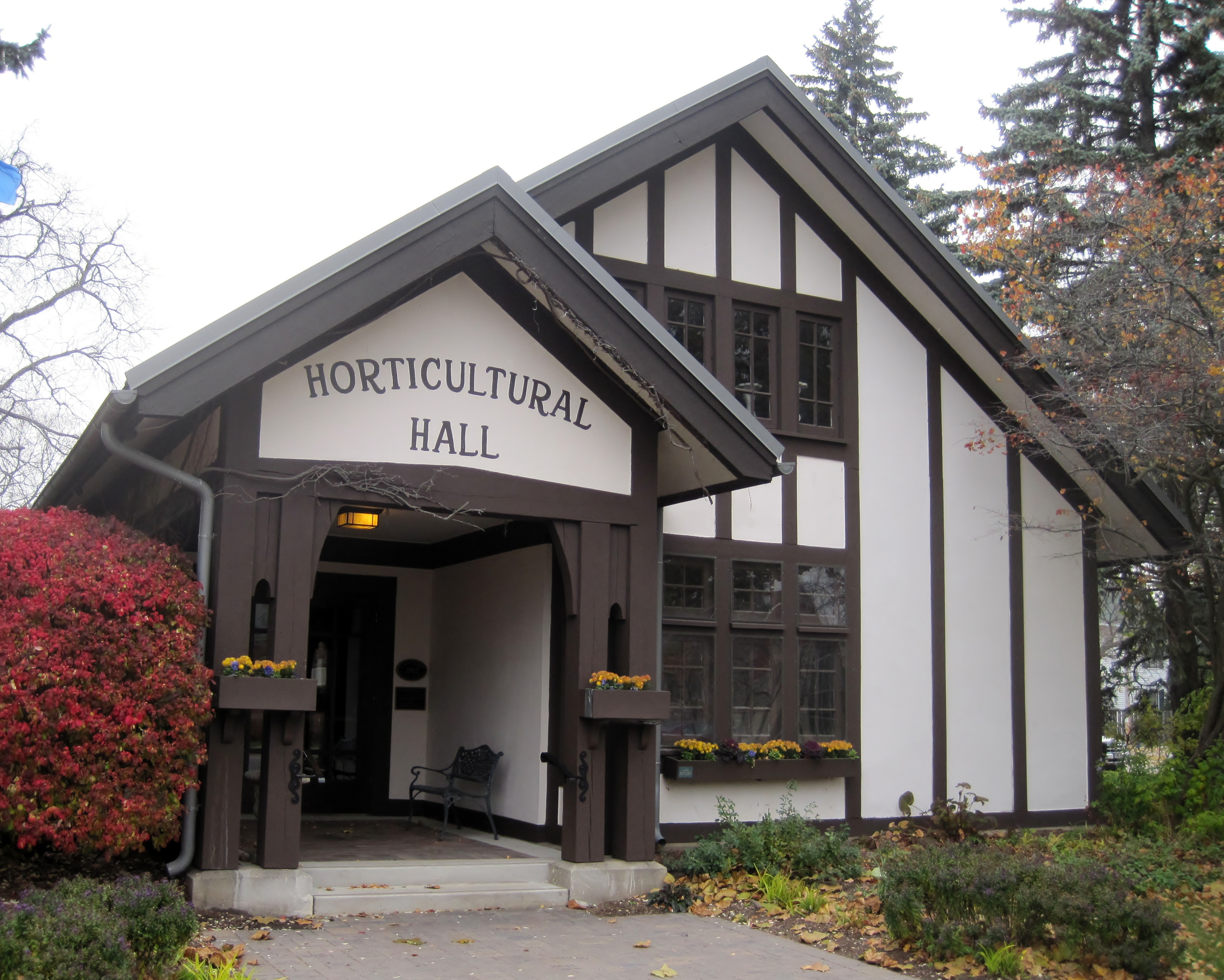

- Location within Wisconsin Location within the United States
- Location: 330 Broad St., Lake Geneva, Wisconsin
- Coordinates: 42°35′39″N 88°26′7″W
- Area: less than one acre
- Architect: Spencer and Powers; Reinert, Malsch and Baumbach
- Architectural style: Bungalow/Craftsman
- NRHP reference No.: 99001220
- Added to NRHP: September 29, 1999

Horticultural Hall is a conference center in Lake Geneva, Wisconsin. Listed on the National Register of Historic Places, it was built in 1911 as a location for the professional gardeners working on nearby estates to meet and discuss their work.

In 1968, the Horticultural Hall served as the site of the first formal Gen Con, organized by Gary Gygax. Gen Con was hosted there until it was moved to the University of Wisconsin–Parkside campus in Kenosha in 1978.

The hall was listed on the National Register of Historic Places in 1999.
