= NASCRAG =

Organization

- One of NASCRAG's logos featuring mascot "Little Toby"
- Formation: 1980
- Type: Private organization
- Members: 60-80
- Event Organizer: Ross Davidson
- Website: http://www.nascrag.org/

NASCRAG is the National Society of Crazed Gamers, a group of gamemasters, writers, and artists who have been presenting a series of multi-round role-playing tournaments at the Gen Con game convention since 1980.

== Background ==
The NASCRAG tournament is one of the largest and the oldest independent role-playing competitions at Gen Con. It is a multi-round, single-elimination, team advancement tournament in which teams of six (this number has varied over the years) compete with other teams in a role-playing adventure. Teams are scored on role-playing and achieving personal and team goals.

From 1980 through 2010 the NASCRAG tournaments were Dungeons & Dragons. From 2011 they have been based on the Pathfinder Roleplaying Game (PFRPG).

== Organization ==
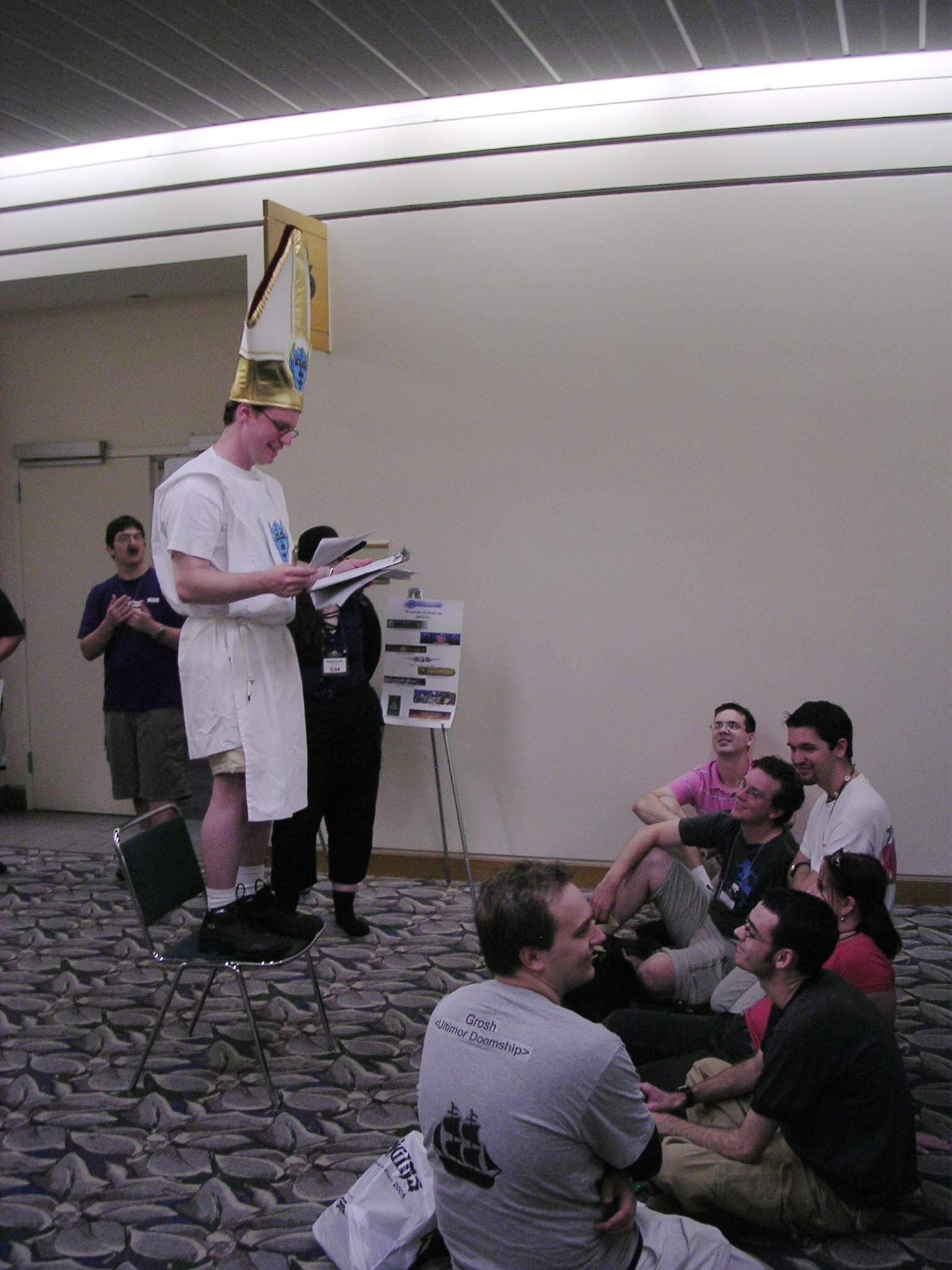
Tom Lommel organizing players for "NASCRAG Presents: A Small Problem" at Gen Con Indy 2005. Photograph by Alan De Smet.

NASCRAG is an independent gaming organization that consists of a core of 60 to 80 members. GenCon provides Nascrag with 20-30 complimentary GM badges every year and some judges simply pay their own way.

Event organization duties for NASCRAG are handled by Ross Davidson and David Mitchard. NASCRAG was previously run by "Squirrel Queen" Carole Bland, who took over the post from her husband, NASCRAG Chief Lackey Emeritus, Len Bland, in 1993.

The job of marshaling the roughly 100 players per timeslot (4 or 5 timeslots per year) into manageable teams of six is handled by NASCRAG's Master of Ceremonies. In 2017 Doug Moore took over the Master of Ceremonies duties. From 2004 to 2016 the position was held by Tom Lommel and his assistant Buster Pishkur. Through many years in the 1980s and 1990s, Buster also assisted NASCRAG's longtime Head Marshall "Big" Al Baker.

NASCRAG's elaborate scorekeeping system is currently handled by Ross Davidson.

NASCRAG keeps a steady influx of fresh blood through the efforts of "pressgangs," led by Brian Chase and Doug Moore. Pressgangs wander the halls of Gen Con, attempting to persuade new players to join.

== History ==
In 1979 a group of friends attending Gen Con wanted to play in the D&D Open. But the Open was very popular and had to turn away many players that year. These friends, headed up by Len Bland and James Robert, decided to run their own tournament starting in 1980.

Early NASCRAG adventures featured intricate story lines with epic heroic adventure and puzzle solving. This has evolved into an emphasis on role-playing, humor, and puzzles that differs greatly from the combat, strategy, and dice-rolling of traditional D&D tournaments. The NASCRAG focus is on the characters, their interactions, and their relationship to the unfolding story. The characters are individually illustrated and often given distinctive mannerisms or vocal accents to encourage role-playing.

Bill "Indy" Cavalier joined the group in 1982 (Fez III) and has been contributing an increasing number of illustrations to NASCRAG events ever since. Indy's lighthearted style complements NASCRAG's humorous adventures.

After more than three decades of existence, NASCRAG and its players have formed a growing community at Gen Con. Hundreds of players return every year to play and try to win. Some teams have been participating for decades.

The judges are all highly experienced GMs and players, usually recruited from winning teams from past tournaments.

NASCRAG has been around long enough that several children of the original members now judge for the group.

== Adventures ==
=== Primary Tournament ===
Every year, NASCRAG runs a multi-round adventure as its primary tournament.

The Fez series (1980–1985)
Six adventures based on the troubles of Fez – the Wizard of Time. Licensed and printed by Mayfair Games in the 1980s. It was during this period that the name NASCRAG was coined.
The Zef series (1986–1992)
Seven adventures based around Lord Becket, his freedom fighters, the evil Queen Bea the Weredragon, and an alien bird named Zef whose peck would cause personalities to switch bodies.
The Nexus series (1993–1996)
Four adventures featuring dimension-hopping via the portal known only as the NEXUS, while battling the Demoness Nox and the trickster spirit Coyote.
Northern (L)attitudes (1997)
A stand-alone adventure ranging from the frozen north to a Jimmy Buffett inspired tropical island in which the heroes were searching for a fabled, lost magic item to combat an ice golem.
Catgut Willy and the Whirling Vortex of Doom (1998)
A stand-alone adventure in which one band of "Jacks" pursue a younger band of "Jacks" into the land of Faerie to save the world from the aforementioned Vortex. It memorably featured Flambeau the flamin' pig.
The NASCRAG University series (1999–2001)
Three adventures about the time and dimension traveling agents of the BUSCI organization and their struggles against the evil ASCII Corporation.
The Seconds series (2002–2004)
Three time traveling adventures in which humans and elves must work together to aid the eccentric Doc Zown against the depredations of the Spider Queen Lilth and her Dark Race Of Warriors. The fight ranged even into Nashalla, the NASCRAG afterlife.
The Small Problems series (2005–2007)
Three adventures in which miniaturized heroes aid Prince Neville O'Bannon – a faerie god-child who doesn't know the limits of his own powers. It features faerie assassins, the mouse-folk of Emerald Bay, and a fantastic voyage inside the Prince's body in a yellow submarine. 2006's event was titled "A Touch of Fever." The final installment of this series, entitled "A Little Revenge", took place in 2007.
The Pretanic Island Saga series (2008–2010)
All the power of Venezia poises to crush the Islands. What can six smelly humanoids do against that?
The Stolen Lives Series - (2011-2013)
2011's event was entitled "Reality's Bite": Six strangers, marooned on a tropical island. Can they pull together before all is LOST? 2012's event was entitled "Harsh Realities": What is real and what is Illusion? ...and how can you ever be sure? The resistance is offering you a chance to fight back against the corporate empire of the Marklar. Do you trust them? The final event in the series took place in 2013 and was entitled "Stranger Than Fiction"
The Night Otter series - (2014-2016)
The pirate crew of the Night Otter faces dark voodoo and a zombie apocalypse. Starting with 2014, Nascrag changed to a two-round format. 2014's event was entitled "Mutiny on the Night Otter". 2015's event was entitled "Revenge of the Night Otter. 2016's event was entitled "Curse of the Night Otter."
A Little Madness Now and Then - (2017)
Six strangers wake to find themselves inmates in a bizarre asylum. Escaping their captivity is only the beginning as the Great Old Ones stir in their slumber, roused by dark rituals in the night.
Let's Be Bad - (2018)
After years of famine, the kingdom is in grave danger. But the heroes cannot save it because they're part of the problem. Time for the villains to have their day in the sun. But getting into the capitol is just the beginning of an adventure of twists, sins and imagination.

=== Secondary Events ===
In some years (when they are feeling ambitious) NASCRAG will run a second event.

Penguins of Destiny (1988)
a one-round adventure where the heroes must retrieve the stolen Penguins of Destiny: magical statuettes with fabulous powers. The players must learn to work together or die separately. An enhanced version of this event was also played at Winter Fantasy 1998. The author of this tournament was named Treasurer for life of NASCRAG when he sold a small plastic penguin miniature at the Gen Con Auction for $20. (The office of treasurer has no official duties.)
Requiem (1987)
a Donagael Saga tournament run by NASCRAG.
Dance for a Dead Princess (1989)
another Donagael Saga tournament, also run by NASCRAG. Danu's daughter Earrach has fallen into the hands of Lord Bile. Can you, the children of Danu, brave the lands where pain and death are real to restore life to the land?
AD&D Missions of Guilt (1990)
The players have been banished to the caverns beneath Stonefast Citadel and must clear their names and save the besieged fortress.
Celluloid Pirates (1992)
a Buck Rogers in the 25th century adventure – The crew of the Dream Runner hijack the space yacht Masquerade in hopes of capturing some rare, ancient celluloid.
The Xemo series (1997, 1998, 2006, 2016)
three adventures featuring the illusionist Xemo and his clown servants. These adventures were run in addition to the main NASCRAG events in their given years, and the proceeds donated to the Elizabeth Glaser Pediatric AIDS Foundation. 2006 was "Xemo III: The Cleric's Curse. The 2016 event was Xemo IV: Insanity"
The Rosenchild Finishing School for Wayward Nobles series (2012-2015; 2017)
Library of Doom (2012): proceeds will benefit the Gygax Memorial Fund. The Desert of Destiny (2013): proceeds will benefit the Gygax Memorial Fund. The Doom Cup (2014):proceeds will benefit the Robert E. Howard House and Museum. A Touch of Class (2015):proceeds will benefit the Robert E. Howard House and Museum. To Save the King (2017): proceeds benefited Child Advocates
