= Gen Con =

Tabletop game convention in North America

Gen Con Indy
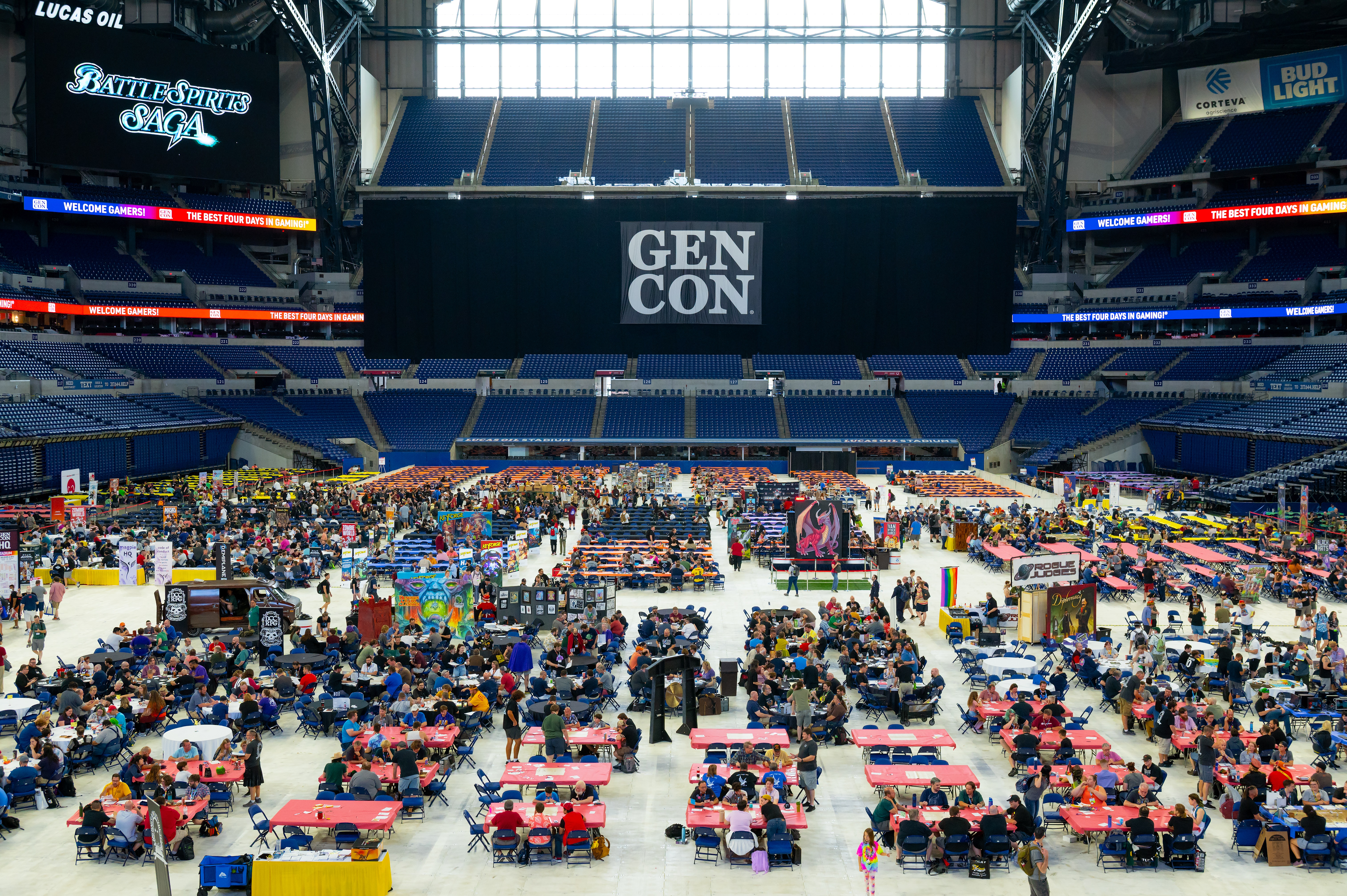
- Attendees in Lucas Oil Stadium in 2023
- Genre: Gaming
- Venue: Indiana Convention Center
- Location: Indianapolis, Indiana
- Country: United States
- Inaugurated: 1968
- Attendance: 71,000 in 2024
- Organizer: Gen Con LLC
- Website: GenCon.com

A video of Gen Con 2025 from the 300 level of Lucas Oil Stadium

Gen Con is the largest tabletop game convention in North America by both attendance and number of events. It features traditional pen-and-paper, board, and card games, including role-playing games, miniatures wargames, live action role-playing games, collectible card games, and strategy games. Gen Con also features computer games. Attendees engage in a variety of tournament and interactive game sessions. In 2019, Gen Con had nearly 70,000 unique attendees.

Established in 1968 as the Lake Geneva Wargames Convention by Gary Gygax, who later co-created Dungeons & Dragons, Gen Con was first held in Lake Geneva, Wisconsin. The convention was moved to various locations in Wisconsin from 1972 to 1984 before becoming fixed in Milwaukee, Wisconsin, in 1985, where it remained until moving to Indianapolis, Indiana, in 2003. Other Gen Con conventions have been held sporadically in locations around the United States, as well as internationally.

In 1976, Gen Con became the property of TSR, Inc., the gaming company co-founded by Gary Gygax. In 1997, TSR (and Gen Con) were acquired by Wizards of the Coast, which was subsequently acquired by Hasbro. In 2002, Hasbro sold Gen Con to the former CEO of Wizards of the Coast, Peter Adkison. Gen Con spent a short time under Chapter 11 bankruptcy protection, due to a lawsuit brought against them by Lucasfilm in 2008. The organization emerged from bankruptcy protection a year later, while still holding its regularly scheduled events and became larger than ever.

== History ==
=== Early years ===
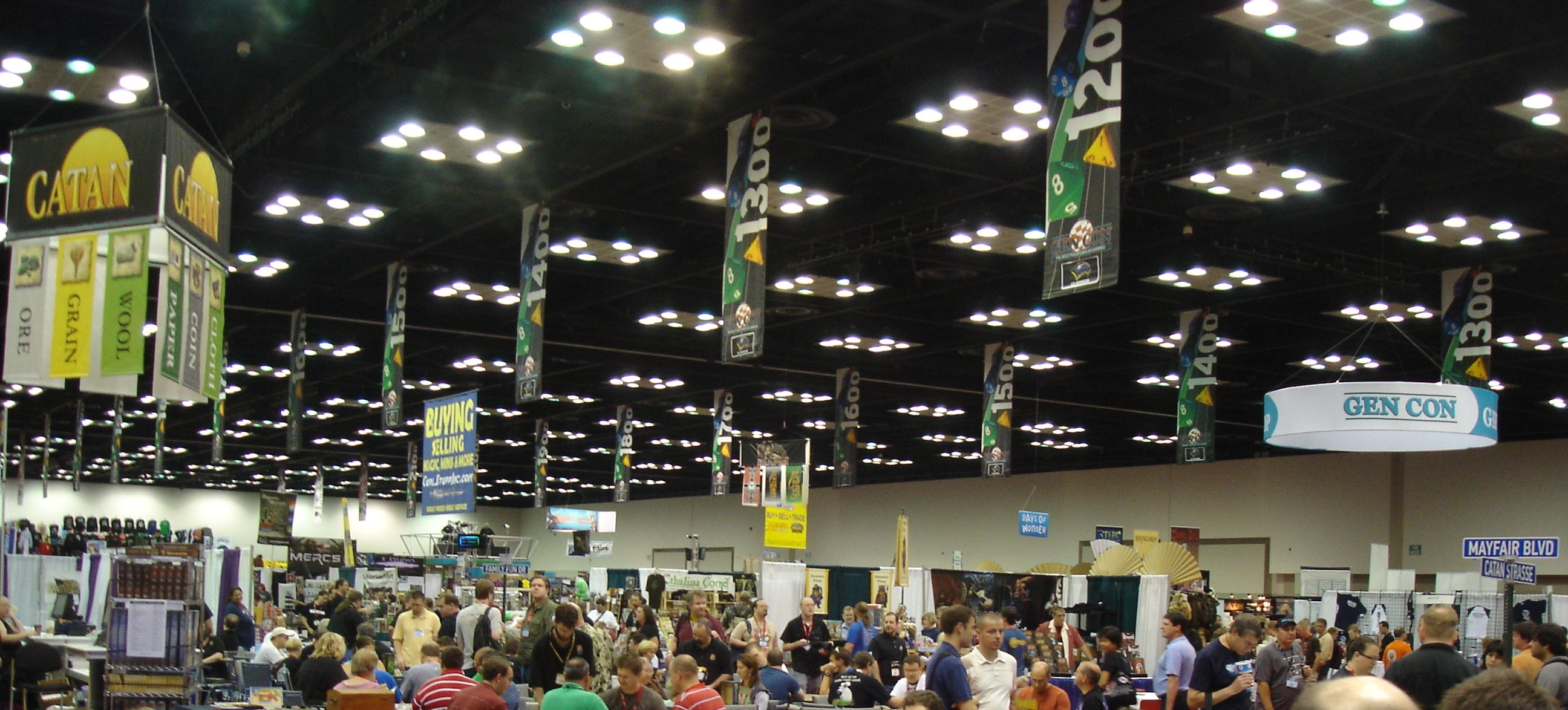
Part of the exhibit hall space during Gen Con Indy 2010

The International Federation of Wargaming (IFW) hosted a number of small regional conventions in the months following its foundation in 1967, including the first annual club convention in Malvern, Pennsylvania, in August. Some IFW gamers in the Chicago area could not make the journey to Malvern, so they had an informal gathering that same weekend at the Lake Geneva, Wisconsin home of Gary Gygax. Later this gathering would come to be referred to as "Gen Con 0".

In 1968, Gygax rented Lake Geneva's Horticultural Hall to hold a follow-up IFW convention, the Lake Geneva Wargames Convention, later known as the Gen Con gaming convention. The IFW, which Gygax co-founded, put up $35 of the $50 Horticultural Hall fee to sponsor this first Gen Con. Almost 100 people attended. At the second Gen Con in August 1969, Gygax met Rob Kuntz, and Dave Arneson. During these early conventions, the events centered around board games and miniature wargames.

Gen Con's name is a derivation of "Geneva Convention", due to the convention's origins in Lake Geneva. It is also a play on words, as the "Geneva Conventions" are a set of important international treaties regarding war, the subject of many of the early games. Starting in 1971, Gen Con was cosponsored by the Lake Geneva Tactical Studies Association.

=== TSR ===
Beginning in 1975, Gen Con was managed and hosted by TSR, Inc., original publisher of the Dungeons & Dragons role-playing game. During the following decade the event grew and was hosted at a variety of southern Wisconsin locations, including an American Legion Hall, George Williams College, and the former Lake Geneva Playboy Resort. In 1978, the convention moved to the University of Wisconsin–Parkside campus in Kenosha, where it remained to 1984.

A Gen Con West was held in California for only three years, 1976–1978. From 1978 to 1984, Gen Con South was held in Jacksonville, Florida. Gen Con East was held in 1981 and 1982, first in Cherry Hill, New Jersey, and then in Chester, Pennsylvania.

=== MECCA ===
In 1985, Gen Con moved to the Milwaukee Exposition & Convention Center & Arena (MECCA) in Milwaukee, due to a need for more space. After the move, attendance steadily rose from 5,000 to a peak of 30,000 in 1995, making Gen Con the premier event in the role-playing game industry. In 1992, Gen Con broke every previous attendance record for game conventions in the United States, with more than 18,000 people. Gen Con briefly joined with its primary competitor, the Origins Game Fair, and the two were run as a single convention in 1988.

Wizards of the Coast debuted Magic: The Gathering at Gen Con in August 1993. The game proved extremely popular, selling out its supply of 2.5 million cards, which had been scheduled to last until the end of the year. The ensuing collectible card game craze has been credited with generating the extra attendance that produced the 1995 record.

=== Wizards of the Coast ===
In 1997, Wizards of the Coast purchased TSR. In 1998, Gen Con moved to the Midwest Express Center, now the Baird Center. Wizards of the Coast was itself purchased by Hasbro in 1999. In November 1999, Wizards announced that Gen Con would leave Milwaukee after the 2002 convention. In May 2002, Peter Adkison, founder of Wizards of the Coast, purchased Gen Con from Hasbro, forming Gen Con LLC to run the convention. The first show under Adkison's leadership took place that August in Milwaukee.

=== Indianapolis ===
In 2003, the convention moved to Indianapolis. Peter Adkison attributed the move to the lack of hotel space, the convention center layout, and frequently broken escalators in Milwaukee's convention center.

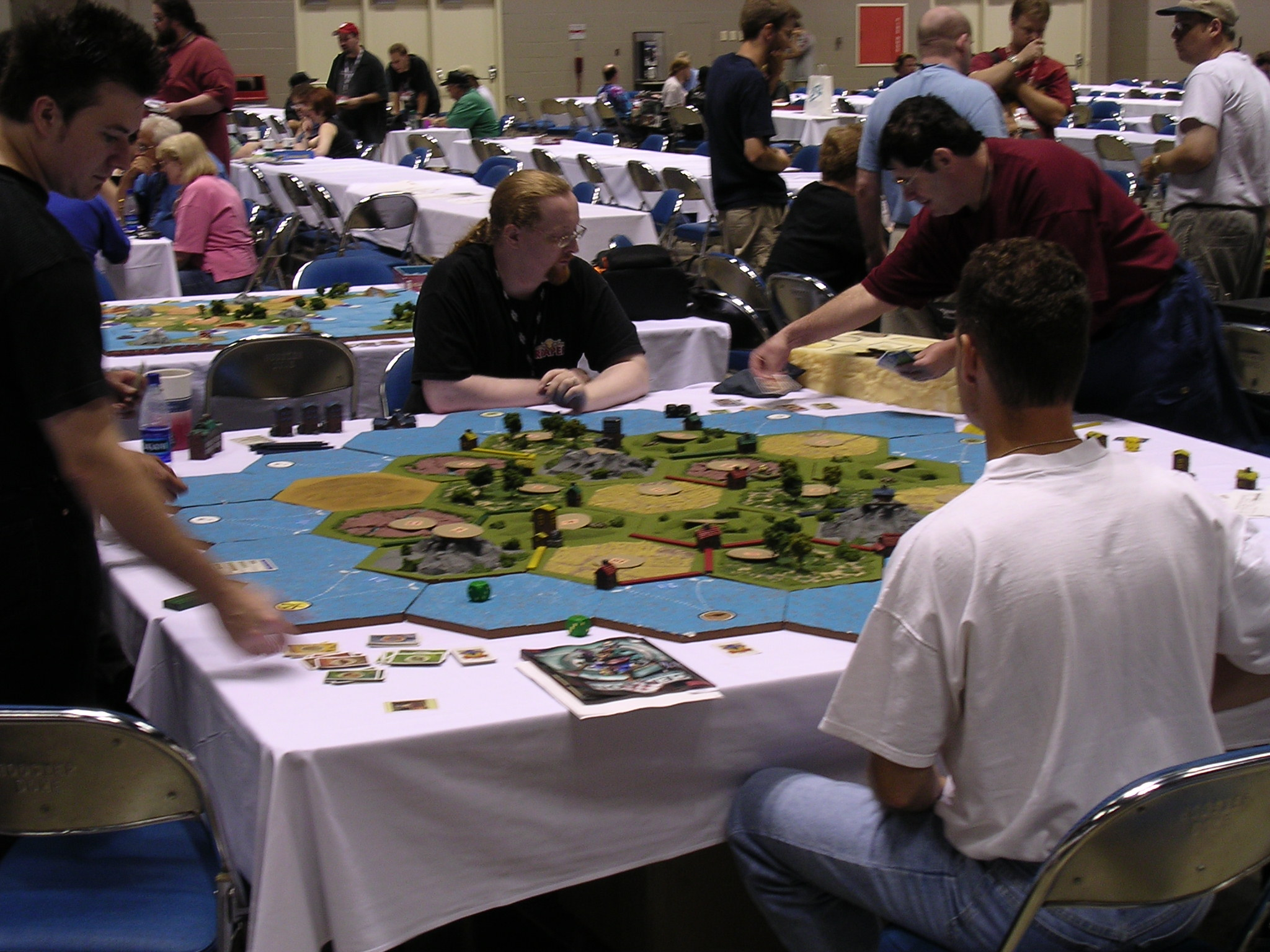
A game of The Settlers of Catan being played at Gen Con Indy 2003

In Indianapolis, the convention, now called Gen Con Indy, continued to draw between 20,000 and 30,000 visitors each year, at the Indiana Convention Center. Wizards of the Coast helped celebrate the 30th anniversary of the Dungeons & Dragons game at Gen Con Indy 2004. In 2005, Gen Con Indy generated the most direct visitor spending of any annual convention in Indianapolis.

Adkison also restarted the convention in California, this time named Gen Con SoCal. Smaller than its mid-western counterpart, it drew approximately 6,300 attendees in 2005, making it the third-largest consumer hobby game convention in North America. It was held in the Anaheim Convention Center.

In spite of Adkison saying that he did not want Gen Con to become a "mini-E3" in 2003, when E3 downsized in mid-2006, Gen Con LLC announced it would provide more show space for video game businesses. Gen Con described their intention to "pick up where E3 [left] off".

Also in 2006, Gen Con LLC ran the official Star Wars convention, called Star Wars Celebration.

The Indiana Convention Center completed a major expansion in 2011, in large part, to accommodate increased attendance to Gen Con, at a cost of over $275 million.

=== International ===
Gen Con was held in Europe in the 1990s, with the first annual European Gen Con held in Camber Sands, Sussex, England, in 1990, and Gen Con Barcelona in Spain in 1994. The European convention was held in England for 8 years, eventually migrating from Camber Sands in the mid-1990s to Loughborough, where the final UK-based European event was held in 1997, the same weekend on which Princess Diana died.

There was no European Gen Con in 1998. It reappeared in Belgium in 1999 for a single year, before again reappearing in Paris for three years between 2006 and 2008. Benelux Gen Con was held in the Netherlands in 1998 and re-occurred there in 2000. Gen Con Barcelona occurred five years, in 1994–1996, 1999, and 2004. Gen Con UK was held between 1998 and 2005. A Gen Con was held in Brisbane, Australia, in July 2008 and again in September 2009. A third Gen Con Australia was scheduled for 2010, but was cancelled.

=== Online ===
When the COVID-19 lockdown prompted Gen Con to cancel the in-person convention in 2020, it instead ran an online version. While the in-person convention returned the following year, an online version was run concurrently until Gen Con ceased operations of Gen Con Online after the 2023 show.

== Events ==
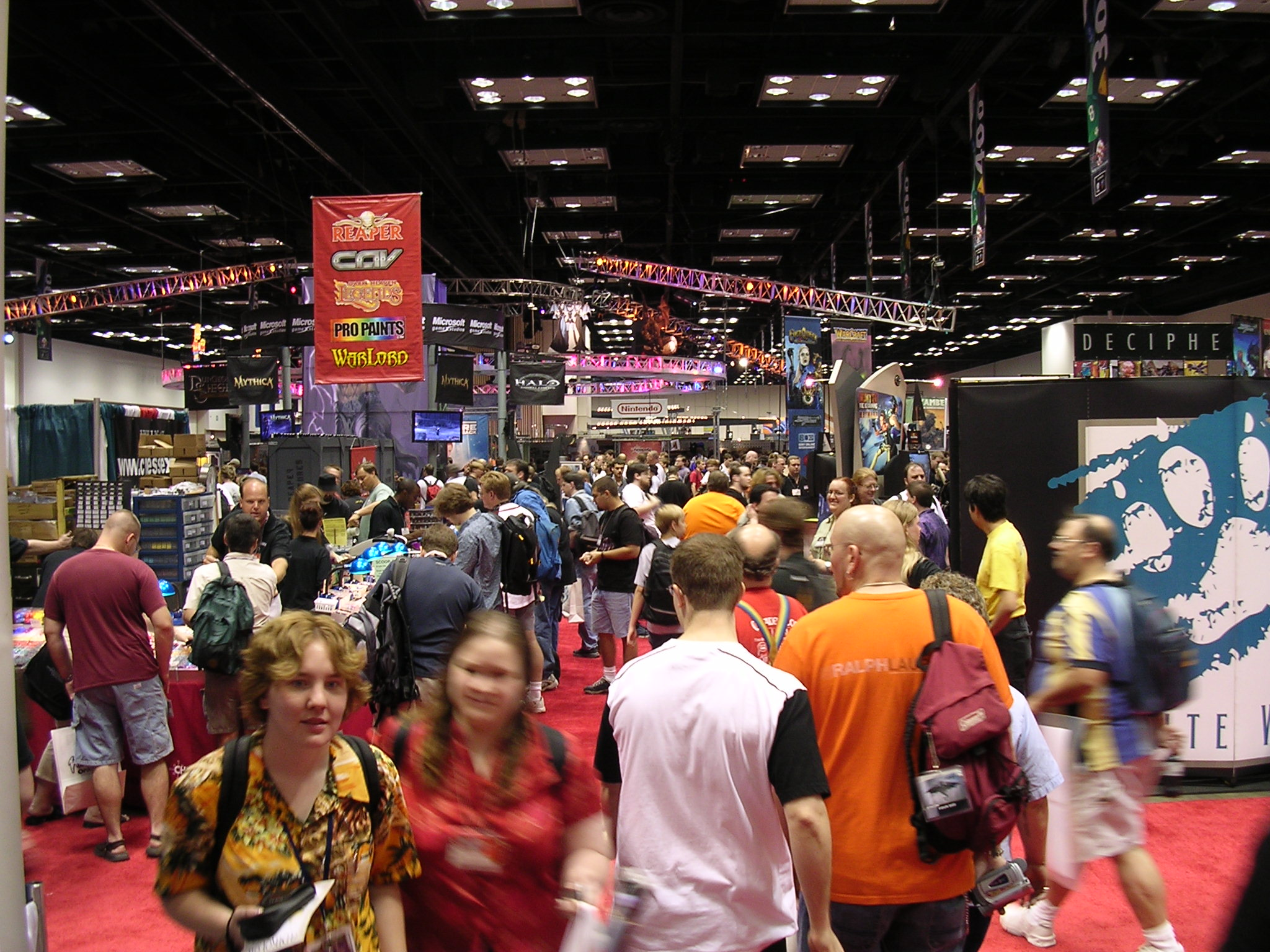
The Gen Con Indy 2003 exhibit hall

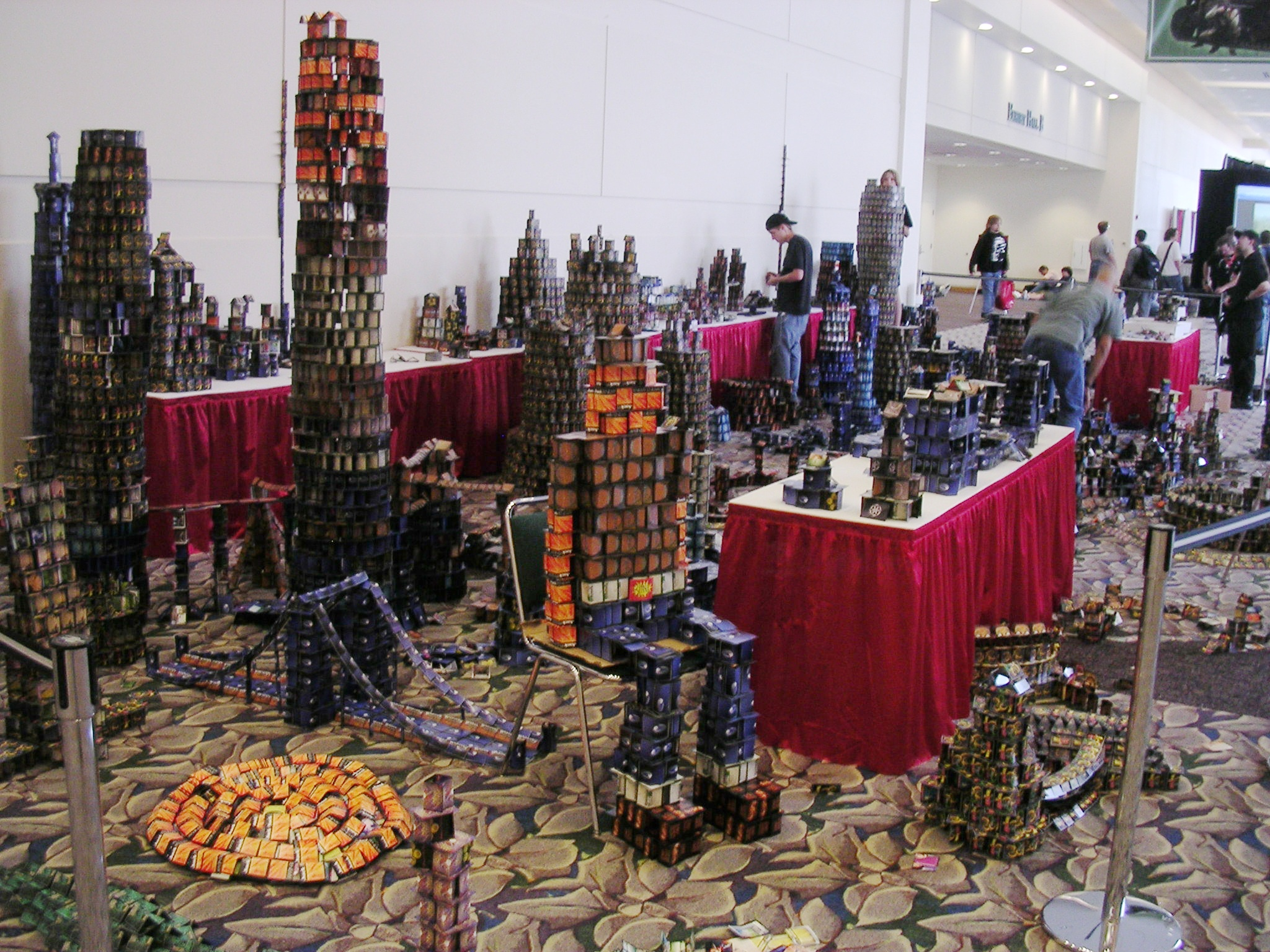
Cardhalla at Gen Con 2005

The convention features a large exhibit hall filled with game publishers, artists, and related businesses, wherein most attendees spend at least $100. The only game to be on the event schedule every year since the convention's inception is Fight in the Skies, later renamed Dawn Patrol.

The D&D Championship Series, formerly the D&D Open, is a long-running series of Dungeons & Dragons games at Gen Con, beginning in 1977. The RPGA, beginning in 1981, has run large numbers of events at Gen Con, so extensive they have been given their own category. The RPGA events are primarily "Living" games where players create characters who persist between events. The RPGA first ran events in 1981.

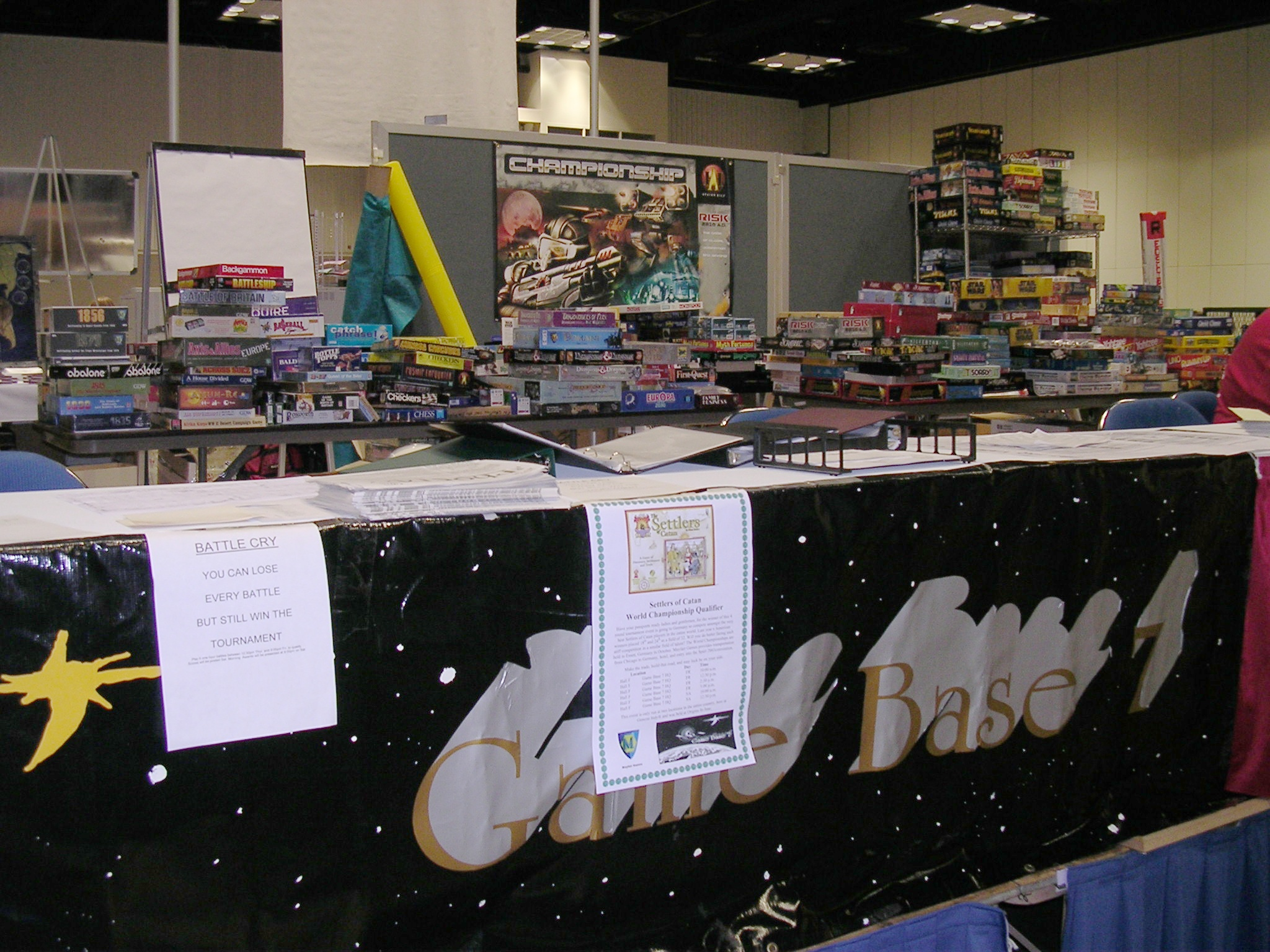
The Game Base 7 games library from the 2003 Gen Con Indy

In 1987 a games library was added from which attendees could borrow games. Appearing in 1994 was the first Magic: The Gathering World Championship, won by Zak Dolan, who defeated France's Bertrand Lestrée in the finals.

Gen Con has featured a number of events that raise money for a variety of charities. These include Cardhalla, in which donated cards are used to build a large city. Attendees are then invited to throw coins at the city to destroy it. The coins are collected for charity. Cardhalla was first run in 1999. The gaming group NASCRAG has run Dungeons & Dragons events at Gen Con since 1980. NASCRAG events sometimes donate their ticket fees to charity. The games run tend to be humorous. The Gen Con Live Games Auction is another long-running event, though the majority of the Auction, including the Consignment Store, is not run for charity.

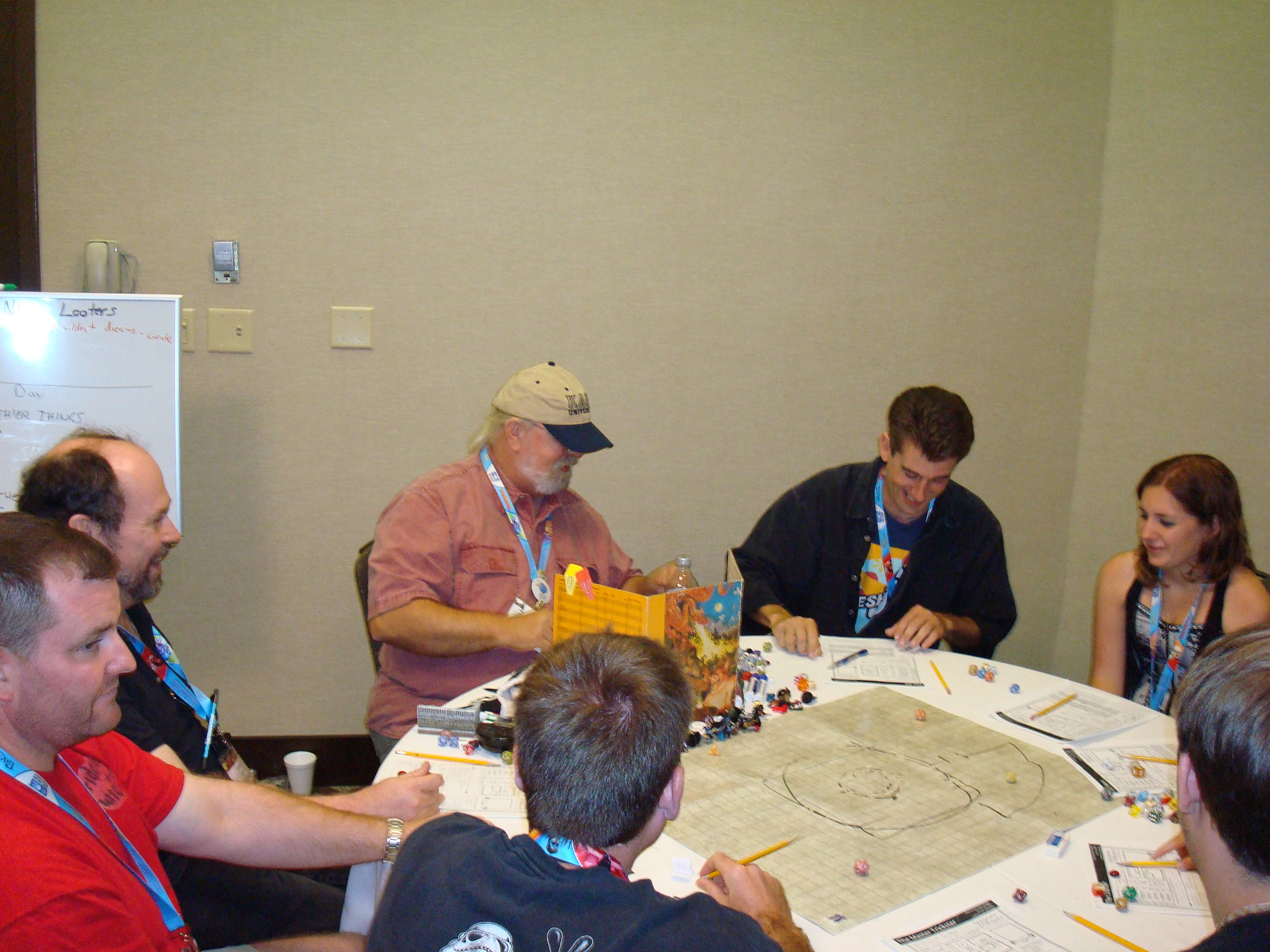
The original editor of Dragon Magazine, Tim Kask, runs a Dungeons & Dragons Game at Gen Con 2009.

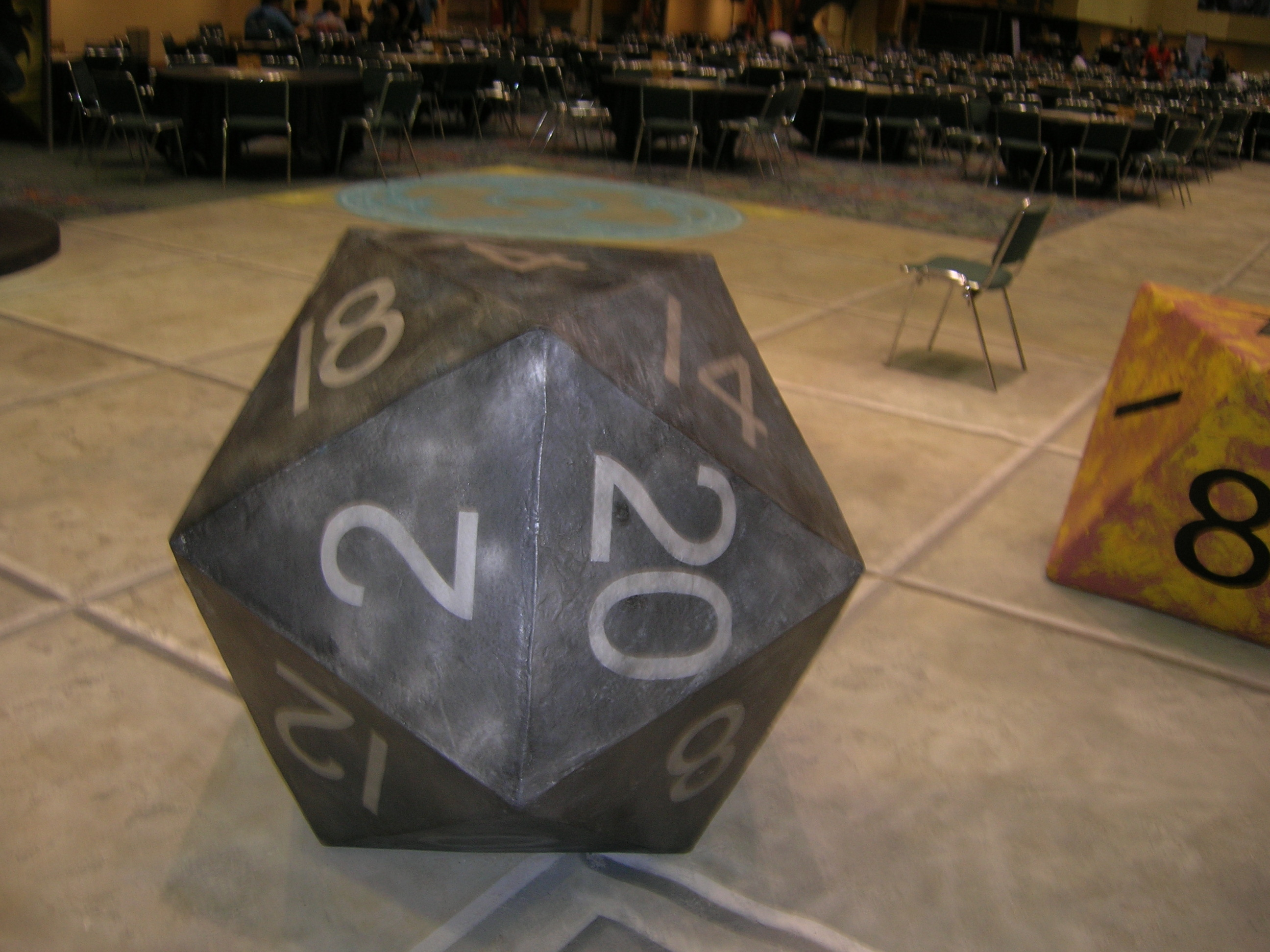
A colossal D20 and nearly-as-colossal D8 at Gen Con 2007

The EN World RPG Awards (the ENnies) are an annual awards ceremony devoted to role-playing games. Established in 2001, the ENnies have been hosted at Gen Con Indy since 2002, and are organized and owned by EN World, a D&D/d20 System news website.

True Dungeon is an immersive life-sized dungeon crawl live action role-playing game (LARP) run at Gen Con since 2003, featuring a series of puzzles and scenarios designed to recreate a D&D environment.

== Issues ==
2008 was a tumultuous year, legally, for Gen Con LLC. On January 10, Lucasfilm filed a lawsuit against them, claiming breach of contract, conversion, and unjust enrichment over Celebration IV, held in 2006. The suit also claims Gen Con failed to give the money raised at a charity auction held at the event to the Make-A-Wish Foundation. Gen Con filed a counter-suit claiming Lucasfilm had no basis for their claims and owed money to Gen Con.

In February 2008, Gen Con LLC announced that it had filed for Chapter 11 bankruptcy protection, citing "significant unforeseen expenses associated with ... externally licensed events". As a result of the bankruptcy filing, the Lucasfilm lawsuit was delayed until November 19, 2008. Gen Con Indy 2008 was held as planned.

In November 2008, a letter of intent to purchase Gen Con LLC's assets was filed with the bankruptcy court. It announced that a to-be-formed company called Gen Con Acquisition Group would purchase Gen Con LLC., for an amount equal to Gen Con LLC's outstanding debt. Gen Con's president, Adrian Swartout, described the letter as "suspiciously cryptic" and concluded that the offer "is not in the best interest of our creditors". Gen Con rejected the hostile takeover bid, and the bankruptcy court allowed Gen Con to emerge from bankruptcy in January 2009, 11 months after it had entered Chapter 11.

In 2008, Christian Children's Fund was reported to have turned down $17,398 from a GenCon Live Game Auction, during that year's Gen Con. The donation was made in honor of Gary Gygax, who died in 2008, and was a frequent donor to CCF. Some individuals within the gaming community expressed disappointment about the decision; author and game designer Rich Burlew, for example, called it "insulting," and the response by gamers led both the CCF and Gen Con to issue official statements explaining what had happened. As a result of the misunderstanding, Gen Con chose to support a different charity.

On March 23, 2015, Adrian Swartout sent a letter to Indiana Governor Mike Pence, asking the governor to reconsider his intent to sign SB 101, the so-called "Religious Freedom" bill that already passed both state legislatures. The bill would allow businesses in the state to deny service to anyone on religious grounds, with opponents of the bill stating that it would allow businesses to unfairly single out and discriminate against the LGBT community and other groups.

Swartout pointed out in the letter that "Gen Con proudly welcomes a diverse attendee base, made up of different ethnicities, cultures, beliefs, sexual orientations, gender identities, abilities, and socio-economic backgrounds" from over 40 countries and all 50 states, and that welcoming such a "wide-ranging diversity has been a key element to the success and growth of our convention", as well as injecting "over $50 million dollars" annually to the local economy. Swartout stated that signing such a bill "will have a direct negative impact on the state economy and factor into [Gen Con's] decision-making on hosting the convention in the state of Indiana in future years," after the Indiana Convention Center had already completed a major expansion in 2011 to accommodate increased attendance to Gen Con. Pence signed SB 101 into effect on March 26, 2015.

In August 2022 when Indiana passed a near total ban on abortions, Gen Con tweeted a statement in support of abortion rights. Gen Con president David Hoppe made the following statement: "Passage of Senate Bill 1 will have an impact on our stakeholders and attendees and will make it more difficult for us to remain committed to Indiana for our long-term home. We are committed here through 2026. We do have to think about what that means beyond that and, of course, we would have to look at what that means for the period up until that time."

== Timeline ==
Attendance at Gen Con conventions, based on the numbers given below:

=== 1967–2002: Gen Con ===
Event	Date	Location	Approximate attendance	Notes
"Gen Con 0"	August 1967	Gary Gygax's Home; Lake Geneva, Wisconsin	12 (Note: "...a weekend gathering of about a dozen aficianados...at the home of future game designer E. Gary Gygax".)	
Gen Con I	August 24, 1968	Horticultural Hall; Lake Geneva, Wisconsin	96 (Note: Gary Gygax is quoted as saying, "I rented the Horticultural Hall for a full 50 dollars. ... admission was one dollar. I had enough paid admissions to exactly cover the cost of the hall." "...there were only maybe 60 people...".)	First official year of Gen Con
Gen Con II	August 23–24, 1969	Horticultural Hall; Lake Geneva, Wisconsin	187 (Note: Gary Gygax is quoted as saying, "...150 paid attendees". See Laws 2007, p. 14.) (Note: Laws report only one day, see Laws 2007, p. 8)	First two-day Gen Con
Gen Con III	August 22–23, 1970	Horticultural Hall/Guild Hall; Lake Geneva, Wisconsin	250	
Gen Con IV	August 21–22, 1971	American Legion Memorial Hall; Lake Geneva, Wisconsin	300	
Gen Con V	August 19–20, 1972	George Williams College; Williams Bay, Wisconsin	200	Gen Con's 5th year
Gen Con VI	August 18–19, 1973	Horticultural Hall/Guild Hall/Legion Hall; Lake Geneva, Wisconsin	300	Tactical Studies Rules (a partnership and predecessor of TSR, Inc.) founded later that year.
Gen Con VII	August 23–25, 1974	Horticultural Hall/Guild Hall/Legion Hall; Lake Geneva, Wisconsin	350	Dungeons & Dragons published; the first three-day Gen Con
Gen Con VIII	August 22–24, 1975	Horticultural Hall/Guild Hall/Legion Hall; Lake Geneva, Wisconsin	900	
Gen Con IX	August 20–22, 1976	Horticultural Hall/Guild Hall/Legion Hall; Lake Geneva, Wisconsin	1,300	TSR takes ownership of convention
Gen Con X	August 18–21, 1977	Playboy Resort/Horticultural Hall/Guild Hall; Lake Geneva, Wisconsin	2,300	Gen Con's 10th year. First four-day Gen Con
Gen Con XI	August 17–20, 1978	University of Wisconsin–Parkside	2,000	Moved to Parkside location
Gen Con XII	August 16–19, 1979	University of Wisconsin–Parkside	>2,000	
Gen Con XIII	August 21–24, 1980	University of Wisconsin–Parkside	4,500	
Gen Con XIV	August 13–16, 1981	University of Wisconsin–Parkside	5,000	
Gen Con XV	August 19–22, 1982	University of Wisconsin–Parkside	>3,000	Gen Con's 15th year
Gen Con XVI	August 18–21, 1983	University of Wisconsin–Parkside	>3,000	
Gen Con 17	Aug. 16–19, 1984	University of Wisconsin–Parkside	3,600	
Gen Con 18	August 22–25, 1985	MECCA (Milwaukee Exposition & Convention Center & Arena), Milwaukee, Wisconsin	5,000	Moved to MECCA
Gen Con 19	August 14–17, 1986	MECCA, Milwaukee, Wisconsin	5,000	
Gen Con 20	August 20–23, 1987	MECCA, Milwaukee, Wisconsin	6,500	Gen Con's 20th year
Gen Con 21/Origins	August 18–21, 1988	MECCA, Milwaukee, Wisconsin	>10,000	Gen Con and Origins were run as a single convention this year
Gen Con '89	August 10–13, 1989	MECCA, Milwaukee, Wisconsin	>10,000	
Gen Con '90	August 9–12, 1990	MECCA, Milwaukee, Wisconsin	>12,000	
Gen Con '91	August 8–11, 1991	MECCA, Milwaukee, Wisconsin	>15,000	
Gen Con/Origins '92	August 20–23, 1992	MECCA, Milwaukee, Wisconsin	>18,000	Gen Con's 25th year. Gen Con and Origins are run as a single convention this year
Gen Con '93	August 19–22, 1993	MECCA, Milwaukee, Wisconsin	20,000	
Gen Con '94	August 18–21, 1994	MECCA, Milwaukee, Wisconsin	>25,000	
Gen Con '95	August 10–13, 1995	MECCA, Milwaukee, Wisconsin	30,000	
Gen Con '96	August 8–11, 1996	MECCA, Milwaukee, Wisconsin	27,000	
1997 Gen Con Game Fair	August 6–10, 1997	MECCA, Milwaukee, Wisconsin	27,000	Wizards of the Coast purchases TSR, Inc., gaining control of Gen Con. Gen Con's 30th year
1998 Gen Con Game Fair	August 6–9, 1998	MEC (Midwest Express Center), Milwaukee, Wisconsin	>19,000	Moved to MEC
1999 Gen Con Game Fair	August 5–8, 1999	MEC, Milwaukee, Wisconsin	>22,000	Wizards of the Coast is purchased by Hasbro after the convention. Hasbro now owns Gen Con.
2000 Gen Con Game Fair	August 10–13, 2000	MEC, Milwaukee, Wisconsin	21,000 (projected)	
2001 Gen Con Game Fair	August 2–5, 2001	MEC, Milwaukee, Wisconsin	25,000	
2002 Gen Con Game Fair	August 8–11, 2002	MEC, Milwaukee, Wisconsin	23,000	Gen Con's last year in Wisconsin, 35th year of the convention. Peter Adkison purchases Gen Con from Hasbro.

=== 2003–present: Gen Con Indy ===
Event	Date	Location	Approximate attendance	Notes
Gen Con Indy 2003	July 24–27, 2003	ICC (Indiana Convention Center), Indianapolis, Indiana	25,000	
Gen Con Indy 2004	August 19–22, 2004	ICC, Indianapolis, Indiana	21,741	
Gen Con Indy 2005	August 18–21, 2005	ICC, Indianapolis, Indiana	25,106	
Gen Con Indy 2006	August 10–13, 2006	ICC, Indianapolis, Indiana	21,250+	
Gen Con Indy 2007	August 16–19, 2007	ICC, Indianapolis, Indiana	27,000	40th anniversary
Gen Con Indy 2008	August 14–17, 2008	Indianapolis, Indiana	28,600+	
Gen Con Indy 2009	August 13–16, 2009	Indianapolis, Indiana	27,900+	
Gen Con Indy 2010	August 5–8, 2010	Indianapolis, Indiana	30,046	
Gen Con Indy 2011	August 4–7, 2011	Indianapolis, Indiana	36,733	
Gen Con Indy 2012	August 16–19, 2012	Indianapolis, Indiana	41,000+	45th anniversary
Gen Con Indy 2013	August 15–18, 2013	Indianapolis, Indiana	49,058	
Gen Con Indy 2014	August 14–17, 2014	Indianapolis, Indiana	56,614	
Gen Con Indy 2015	July 30 – August 2, 2015	Indianapolis, Indiana	61,423	
Gen Con Indy 2016	August 4–7, 2016	Indianapolis, Indiana	60,819	
Gen Con 2017	August 17–20, 2017	Indianapolis, Indiana	60,000+	50th anniversary
Gen Con 2018	August 2–5, 2018	Indianapolis, Indiana	61,424+	
Gen Con 2019	August 1–4, 2019	Indianapolis, Indiana	~70,000	
Gen Con 2020	July 30 to August 2, 2020			In-person convention cancelled due to safety concerns over COVID-19, was held virtually instead
Gen Con 2021	September 16–19, 2021	Indianapolis, Indiana	35,000+	
Gen Con 2022	August 4–7, 2022	Indianapolis, Indiana	50,000+	
Gen Con 2023	August 3–6, 2023	Indianapolis, Indiana	70,000+	20th year in Indianapolis, 55th anniversary
Gen Con 2024	August 1–4, 2024	Indianapolis, Indiana	71,000+	50th anniversary of Dungeons & Dragons
Gen Con 2025	July 31-August 3, 2025	Indianapolis, Indiana	~72,000	

=== Auxiliary Gen Cons ===
==== 1976–1978: Gen Con West ====
Event	Date	Location	Approximate attendance	Notes
Gen Con West	September 4–6, 1976	McCabe Hall, San Jose, California		
Gen Con West 77	September 3–5, 1977	Villa Hotel, San Mateo, California		
Gen Con West 78	September 2–4, 1978	Villa Hotel, San Mateo, California		

==== 1978–1984: Gen Con South ====
Event	Date	Location	Approximate attendance	Notes
Gen Con South	February 9–11, 1978	Robert Meyer Hotel, Jacksonville, Florida		
Gen Con South	February 17–19, 1979	JAX Hilton, Jacksonville FL		
Gen Con South	February 15–17, 1980	Ramada Inn, Jacksonville Beach, Florida		
Gen Con South	February 6–9, 1981	Ramada Inn, Jacksonville Beach, Florida		
Gen Con South	February 5–7, 1982	Jacksonville Beach Convention Center, Jacksonville Beach FL		
Gen Con South	March 11–13, 1983	Thunderbird Resort, Jacksonville FL		
Gen Con South	March 16–18, 1984	Thunderbird Resort, Jacksonville FL		

==== 1981–1982: Gen Con East ====
Event	Date	Location	Approximate attendance	Notes
Gen Con East I	July 23–26, 1981	Cherry Hill Inn, Cherry Hill, New Jersey		
Gen Con East II	June 17–20, 1982	Widener College, Chester, Pennsylvania		

==== 1990–2008: European Gen Con ====
Event	Date	Location	Approximate attendance	Notes
European Gen Con	November 30 – December 2, 1990	Pontin's Holiday Center, Camber Sands, East Sussex, England		
European Gen Con 1991	November 15–17, 1991	Pontin's Holiday Center, Camber Sands, East Sussex, England		
European Gen Con 1992	November 13–15, 1992	Pontin's Holiday Center, Camber Sands, East Sussex, England		
European Gen Con 1993	November 11–14, 1993	Pontin's Holiday Center, Camber Sands, East Sussex, England		
European Gen Con 1994	May 12–15, 1994	Pontin's Holiday Center, Camber Sands, East Sussex, England		
European Gen Con 1995	April 27–30, 1995	Pontin's Holiday Center, Camber Sands, East Sussex, England		
European Gen Con 1996	September 5–8, 1996	Loughborough University, Leicestershire, England		
European Gen Con 1997	August 28–31, 1997	Loughborough University, Leicestershire, England		
Gen Con Europe	July 31 – August 1, 1999	Bouwcentrum, Antwerp, Belgium		
Gen Con Paris	April 21–23, 2006	Paris Est Montreuil, Paris, France	4,000	
Gen Con Paris 2007	May 25–27, 2007	Paris Est Montreuil, Paris, France	4,200	
Gen Con Paris 2008	April 25–27, 2008	Paris, France	9,000	

==== 1994–2004: Gen Con Barcelona ====
Event	Date	Location	Approximate attendance	Notes
Gen Con Barcelona 1994	November 11–13, 1994	Drassanes Reials, Barcelona, Spain		
Gen Con Barcelona 1995	November 3–5, 1995	Drassanes Reials, Barcelona, Spain		
Gen Con Barcelona 1996	November 15–17, 1996	Mercat del Born, Barcelona, Spain		
Gen Con Barcelona 1999	April 9–11, 1999	Cotxeres de Sants, Barcelona, Spain		
Gen Con Barcelona	July 1–4, 2004	Palau Sant Jordi, Barcelona, Spain		(licensed event)

==== 1998–2008: Gen Con UK ====
Event	Date	Location	Approximate attendance	Notes
Gen Con UK 1998	September 3–6, 1998	Loughborough University, Leicestershire, England		
Gen Con UK 1999	September 2–5, 1999	Loughborough University, Leicestershire, England		
Gen Con UK 2000	August 31 – September 3, 2000	Manchester Conference Centre, Manchester University, England		
Gen Con UK 2001	August 30 – September 2, 2001	Olympia 2, London, England		
Gen Con UK 2002	August 29 – September 1, 2002	Olympia 2, London, England		
Gen Con UK 2003	April 18–21, 2003	Olympia 2, London, England		
Gen Con UK 2004	October 14–17, 2004	Minehead Butlins, Somerset, England		(licensed event)
Gen Con UK 2005	November 3–6, 2005	Bognor Regis, West Sussex, England	1,957 (Note: "Perhaps the thing to do is to spread the word so next year there are a lot more of us than this year's attendance figures of 1,957 ..." See Szachnowski 2005.)	(licensed event)
Gen Con UK 2007	August 30 – September 2, 2007	Reading, Berkshire, England	1,746	(licensed event)
Gen Con UK 2008	August 28–31, 2008	Reading, Berkshire, England		(licensed event)

==== 1998–2000: Gen Con Benelux ====
Event	Date	Location	Approximate attendance	Notes
Benelux Gen Con 1998	July 31 – August 2, 1998	Motel Tiel, Tiel, Netherlands		
Gen Con Benelux 2000	September 23–24, 2000	Den Bosch, The Netherlands		Last Gen Con in the Benelux.

==== 2003–2006: Gen Con SoCal ====
Event	Date	Location	Approximate attendance	Notes
Gen Con SoCal 2003	December 11–14, 2003	ACC (Anaheim Convention Center), Anaheim, California	4,148	
Gen Con SoCal 2004	December 2–5, 2004	ACC, Anaheim, California	5,559	
Gen Con SoCal 2005	November 18–20, 2005	ACC, Anaheim, California	6,326	
Gen Con SoCal 2006	November 16–19, 2006	ACC, Anaheim, California	5,840	

==== 2008–2009: Gen Con Australia ====
Event	Date	Location	Approximate attendance	Notes
Gen Con Australia	July 3–6, 2008	BCEC (Brisbane Convention & Exhibition Centre), Brisbane, Queensland, Australia	>10,000	
Gen Con Australia	September 18–20, 2009	BCEC, Brisbane, Queensland, Australia		

=== Scheduled future events ===
Gen Con is scheduled to remain in Indianapolis through 2030.

Event	Scheduled date	Location	Notes
Gen Con Indy 2026	July 30–August 2, 2026	Indianapolis, Indiana	Gen Con 59
Gen Con Indy 2027	August 5 – August 8, 2027	Indianapolis, Indiana	Gen Con 60
Gen Con Indy 2028	August 3 – August 6, 2028	Indianapolis, Indiana	Gen Con 61
Gen Con Indy 2029	August 2 – August 5, 2029	Indianapolis, Indiana	Gen Con 62
Gen Con Indy 2030	August 1 – August 4, 2030	Indianapolis, Indiana	Gen Con 63

== See also ==
- List of gaming conventions

== Sources ==
- Laws, Robin D. (2007). 40 Years of Gen Con. Atlas Games. ISBN 978-1-58978-097-2. first pages preview
- Peterson, Jon (2012). Playing at the World. San Diego CA: Unreason Press. ISBN 978-0615642048.
- Szachnowski, Lucya (2005-11-01). "Gen Con UK 2005" (PDF). Flagship. No. 116. Birmingham, UK. p. 9. Archived from the original (PDF) on 2008-04-10.
