= D&D Championship Series =

Yearly Dungeons & Dragons championship run at Gen Con

The D&D Championship Series was a yearly Dungeons & Dragons championship run at Gen Con. Prior to 2008, the event was known as the D&D Open Championship. The Open first ran in 1977, and was discontinued in 2013. Teams of players competed to complete and score well in a pre-written, multi-part adventure, with higher-ranking teams advancing to later rounds. Eventually a single winning team was selected based on scores. The event was brought back by Wizards of the Coast in 2016 with an adjusted format and for the Origins Game Fair.

The championship was originally handled by the RPGA, a fan organization run by TSR and Wizards of the Coast. The judges were all sanctioned RPGA Dungeon Masters. Prior to the competition, the RPGA created the adventure.

From 2008 to 2013, the championship used the 4th edition Dungeons & Dragons rules. In 2016, the Open Championship used 5th edition, and since 2026, it has used 5.5 edition.

== Structure ==
The Championship was a multi-round event. Pre-generated player characters were provided to the players. The many Dungeon Masters were provided with the same adventure to run. The adventure was divided into three parts, one for each round. Each round was about four hours long. All teams competed in the first round, and were scored after each round based on their progress through the adventure. The exact scoring system was kept secret as the scoring may reveal secrets to be discovered in the adventure, as well as to encourage players to play to the spirit of the game, not to the exact scoring checklist. The highest-ranked teams were invited into the later rounds, and a winner was determined based on overall score.

=== Preliminary round ===
There are two different kinds of preliminary events, or prelims: on-site and off-site. The off-site prelims were run by a local agent of the RPGA and the results are sent in a few weeks before the actual championship. In 2008, roughly 200 teams of five players participated in off-site prelims. On-site prelims were held on the Friday before the final, with 150 teams participating. Each team sits down with a RPGA DM, and they all go through the same module, with the same characters, and the same rules. The round usually lasts around 5 hours, with 30 minutes to prepare, 4 hours of actual gameplay, and another 30 minutes to wrap up.

Once the Prelims were over, judges select around 60 teams to participate in the semifinals, held on Saturday. The scoring criteria for this competition were obscure; even the Dungeon Masters were not certain of the exact method of scoring, and players mostly do not know why they win or lose.

=== Semi-finals ===
The semis followed the same structure as the Prelims, but with fewer teams present. The teams still have to complete the module within 4 hours. Usually, the adventure contains at least one encounter with a less-obvious solution that will give teams seeing that method an advantage.

=== Finals ===
The final is the hardest part of the open, involving the most difficult encounters. It is not surprising to see monsters up to 5 levels higher than the players. During the 2008 finals, the players were level 11, while the final boss, The Rakshasa Emperor, was close to a level 16 Solo Elite Controller, with above 600 Hit points. As the previous rounds, the finals are 4 hours long, with only 12 teams reaching this part of the championship.

== Events ==
=== 1977 ===
The 1977 event featured a judge running two teams against each other, alternating between the two every 15 minutes.

=== 1978 ===
The 1978 event became the series "Vault of the Drow", written by Gary Gygax. There were about 100 slots available for players. About 250 players turned up, and most were turned away.

=== 1979 ===
The first Advanced Dungeons and Dragons Open Tourney at Gen Con XII was based on a high-level character campaign with teams of nine. The winning team—which included Jon Huettel and Todd Huettel (later of FASA), Joel Finkle Kurt Lukas and others—survived longest against a large battle including vampires and Orcus.

=== 1980 ===
The 1980 event became the series Aerie of the Slave Lords.

=== 1988 ===
The 1988 event was "The Changing Season."

- The first Place Team Consisted of Michael A. Ramos (Wizard), Eric Smith (Cleric), and others.

=== 1997 ===
1997's adventure was entitled Cutters, set in Planescape, with characters subtly potentially set against one another in the final round as representatives of Factions all seeking a dangerous tome.

=== 1998 ===
1998s adventure was entitled "The Last Time."

The Open was won by a team of first time players from Arkansas: Jerry Hamra, David Kowalski, Eddie Overstreet, Angie Overstreet, Norman Hunter, Patryk Borowicz, and Robert Beasley.

=== 2004 ===
2004's adventure was Dragonshard, set in the world of Eberron. The adventure was later serialized in Dungeon (magazine) issues 123–125 as Shards of Eberron. This championship used the v3.5 Edition rules.

- 1st Place: Aqua Teen Hunger Force
  - Team members: Jeremy Best, Bryant Cobarrubias, Ronald Janik, Joe Jolly, Richard Mickwee, Ronny Serio

The 2004 D&D Open was also run in the UK at UKGenCon 2004 (Butlins Minehead)

- 1st Place : The Exiled
  - Peter Mitchell, Stuart Parr, Daniel Lewis, Tim Goodwin, Damon Glouchkow Vanessa Wisdom

Runners-up : Fearsome Foursome, The Dead Four

=== 2005 ===
2005's adventure was Crown of Winter Flame, a sequel to 2004's adventure. Like the previous adventure it was set in the world of Eberron.

- 1st Place: Team Blue Moon
- 2nd Place: Aqua Teen Hunger Force

=== 2006 ===
The 2006 adventure was named Tomb of Eternity, took place on Eberron, and tasked the players with recovering an artifact called the "Heart of Reason" from the heavily trapped tomb of the ghost of a Green Dragon known as "The Miser." The 2006 characters were selected in an online poll. Teams consisted of 6 players. The 2006 character sheets

- 1st Place: Aqua Teen Hunger Force
  - Team members: Jeremy Best, Bryant Cobarrubias, Ronald Janik, Joe Jolly, Richard Mickwee, Ronny Serio.

=== 2007 ===
Characters for the 2007 Open were selected based on an online poll. The teams had 6 players, and the characters were level 6 for the prelims and the semi-finals, and 7 for the finals. Character included a Human Paladin, a Rogue, a Duskblade, a Sorcerer, a Favored Soul, and a Barbarian

- 1st Place: Aqua Teen Hunger Force
  - Team members: Jeremy Best, Bryant Cobarrubias, Ronald Janik, Joe Jolly, Richard Mickwee, Ronny Serio. Alternates used in the 2nd Round for Bryant Cobarrubias and Ronny Serio: Shawn Robbins and Dan Young.

=== 2008 ===
The 2008 edition of the championship was the first one to use the 4th edition rules. The winning teams were:

- 1st Place: Three Fifth Canadian
- 2nd Place: The Evil League of Evil
- 3rd Place: Team Gambit

The 2008 champions were:

- Lee Shaver - Playing Lorean (Eladrin Wizard - Controller)
- Nick Miller - Playing (Dwarf Warlock - Striker)
- Guillaume-Charles Coutu - Playing Reynard (Human Guardian Fighter - Defender)
- Benoit-Phillipe Coutu - Playing Kiva (Dragonborn Greatweapon Fighter - Defender/Striker)
- Damien Bérubé - Playing Acaleem (Tiefling Warlord - Leader)

=== 2016 ===
Wizards of the Coast brought back the Open, this time running the event at Origins and using the Fifth Edition rules. The Open adventure, 'The Soulbound Tomb,' covered levels 1-10 and was valid for the D&D Adventurers League organized play campaign. Tables competed for 8 hours, including two event-wide puzzles requiring tables to exchange information. Unlike previous Championship tournaments, Wizards aimed to make the event fun even when played by new and casual players, while still rewarding competitive teams. Tables, regardless of power table, all advanced to the final encounter.

The 2016 champion team members were:

- John Bock (Ranger / Rogue)
- Rebekah Moser (Bard)
- Guy Flora (Barbarian)
- Karen Knokes (Cleric)
- Daniel Baldwin (Paladin)
- Doug Davis (Paladin)

=== 2019 ===
The Open returned to the UK in June 2019 at UK Games Expo, offering an adventure based around the upcoming book release "Baldur's Gate: Descent Into Avernus" using D&D 5e rules. This adventure placed teams in groups of six and lasted for roughly eight-hours, with each team competing using pregenerated characters.

The 2019 champion team "Team Daddy" representing FanBoy3 in Manchester were:

- Lizzy T
- Callum Akehurst-Ryan
- Ross Hillier
- Mark Rance
- Yousiff Saxon
- Lewys Stocks
- Alex Lane (DM)

== Prizes ==
The prizes for the 2008 championship consisted mostly of products printed by Wizards of the Coast (owners of the RPGA). The prizes included

- Box set of Core Rulebooks
- Forgotten Realm Campaign Settings
- Three latest Tiles sets
- All 4th edition quests
- The Character Sheets 4th edition pack
- Starter Pack of D&D Miniatures
- Boosters pack of D&D Miniatures
- Swordmage novel by Richard Baker
- iPod Nano Black 8 Gigabytes

The 2016 Open provided a special set of red and black dice to all players. DMs received an event T-shirt. All tables could earn certificates for their characters, valid for Adventurers League organized play, based on achievements they unlocked. The top teams that solved puzzles and did well at the event also received special certificate awards.

== See also ==
- NASCRAG is another Gen Con D&D tournament that formed because of dissatisfaction with the open.
