= Cardhalla =

Charity event

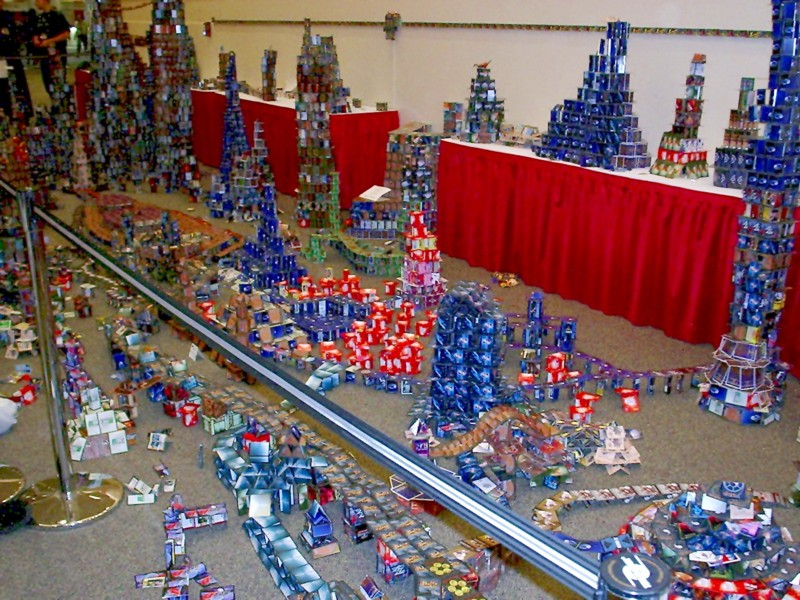
Cardhalla, Gen Con 2004

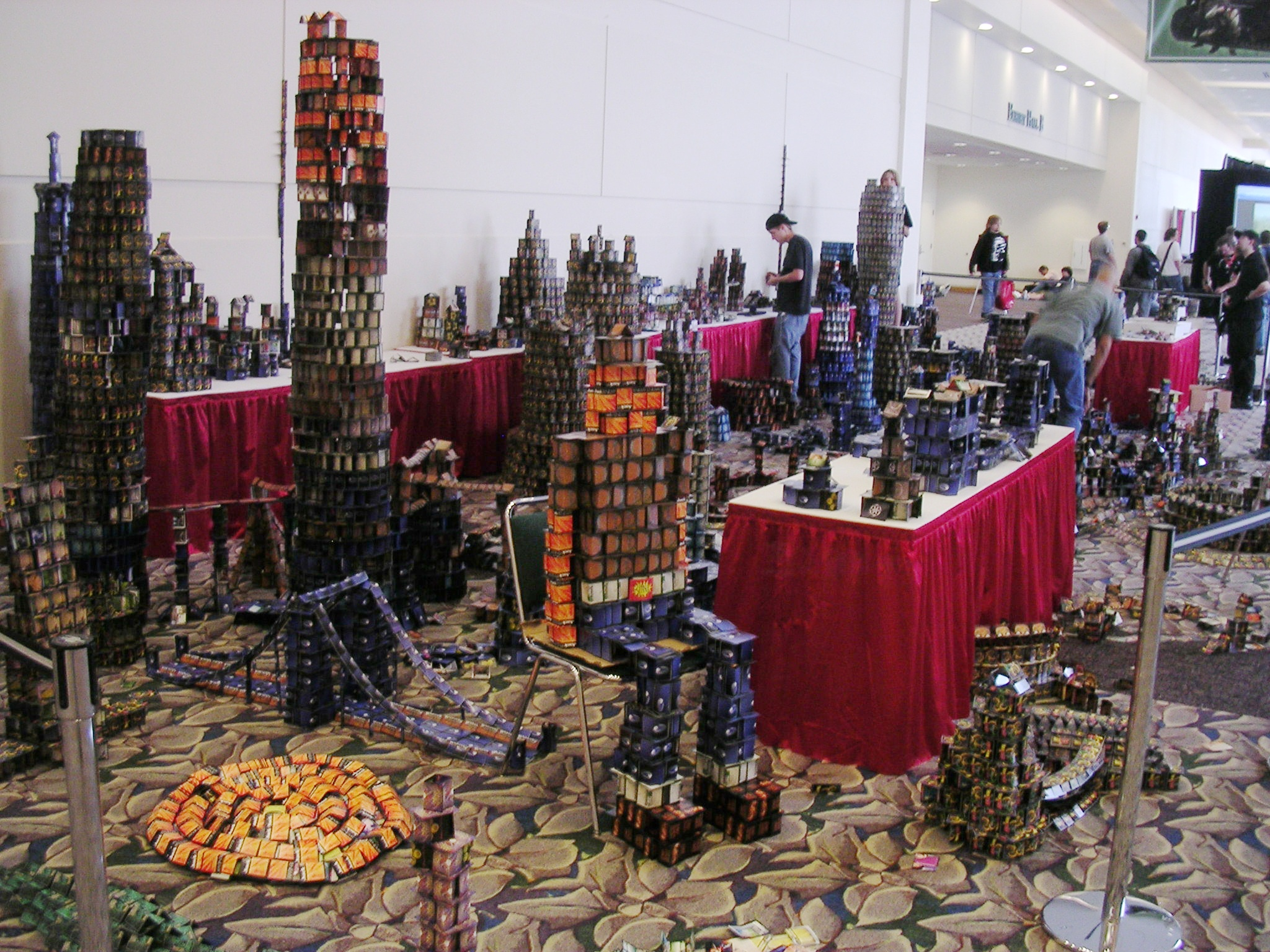
Cardhalla, Gen Con 2005

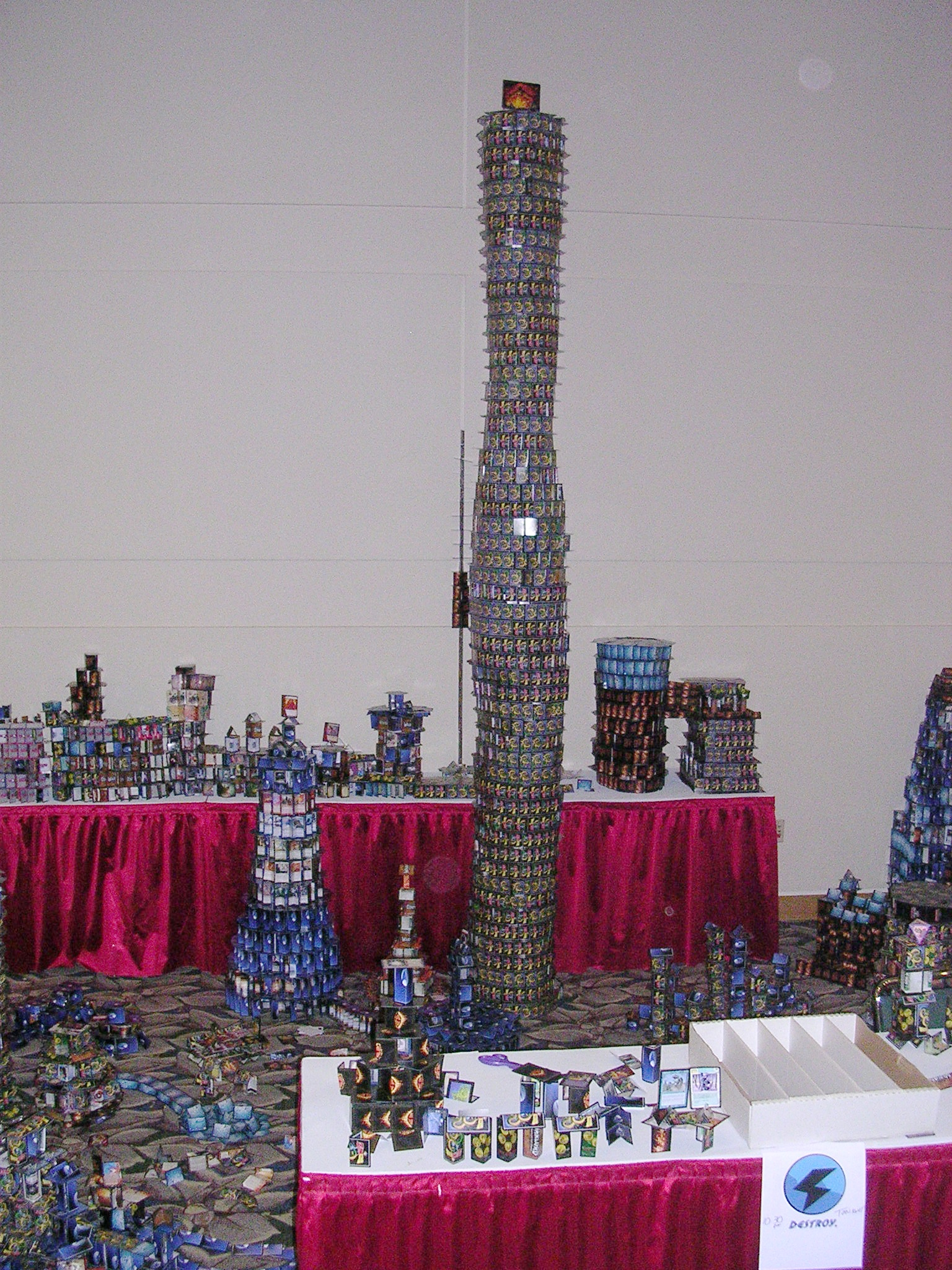
The tallest card tower at Gen Con 2005

Cardhalla is a charity event that has been held at Gen Con since 1999. During the convention, a city is constructed out of donated trading card game cards. Near the end of the convention attendees are invited to throw coins at the city to destroy it. The thrown coins are collected and donated to charity. The motto is: "Build. Donate. Destroy."

The name is a portmanteau of "card" and the Norse city of Valhalla.

== Build ==
Attendees may help in the building process using the cards that are donated. They may come and go as they wish, as the event is a 24-hour event hosted for free. The usual style of building consists of folding cards and stacking them. However, cutting a card to make a fit or even just stacking cards without folding is always an option. Glue, tape, and other adhesives are not permitted.

== Donate ==
Donations come from anyone at the convention. Cards from over 100 different card games have been used. Cards range from the most common to the rarest cards of games. People also donate time to help clean up, manage, and chat.

- 2026 Gen Con: over 10,000 was raised for Immigrant Welcome Center and Superheroines
- 2006 Phoenix ConGames: $276 to orphanage
- 2006 Gen Con: over $500 to Girls and Boys organization
- 2005 Gen Con: over $500 to the Make a Wish Foundation

The original card set that started the building was the premiere of the "Young Jedi" CCG, demo decks were given to everyone at GenCon, and stacks of the starter decks were left scattered around the hall.

== Destroy ==
On Saturday night at 10:00, all are invited to participate in an entertaining charity auction prior to the first throw being made. The opportunity for the first throw is between two representatives of two sides of the crowd watching. In 2026 the crowd was divided into team Carl and Team Everyone else, after many people at the convention cosplayed as Carl that year. Team everyone else, with representative Chelsea won the auction and Chelsea threw the first coin in 2026. After the first throw (typically occurring shortly before 11PM), everyone is invited to destroy the card towers that convention goers had built over the past four days.

With the first city, back then known just as "Cardland", the idea to raffle off the destruction of the city was introduced. The winning entrant decided to invite everyone back to throw coins at the city. This would allow everyone to help in the destruction as well as raise more money for charity, as all the coins would be collected and donated as well. The city takes a matter of minutes to destroy and just under an hour to clean up.

== History ==
Cardland, as the first event came to be known in 1999, happened spontaneously. Free sample packs of cards were given to attendees. A couple of people began to build little towers out of cards while waiting for one of their friends to finish a game. A sign was left out "Add on if you wish, but do not destroy." Soon other convention attendees began adding onto the project. As that Friday night progressed more and more was added on including bridges and tall towers. Roads connected structures, and buildings of all types came about. Soon encompassing 20 tables, both above and below, a city and its suburbs were formed, one of which became known as Cardhalla. The name stuck and the next year, 2000, Cardhalla became an official event of Gen Con, and was designated space within the tournament hall.

A large portion of the cards donated to the original Cardhalla were the giveaways included in every attendee's bag, such as cards from the Monty Python and the Holy Grail card game and various promotional cards. When possible, each building was designed with cards from a similar game or license. (Such as Star Trek, Star Wars, Netrunner and Rage)

Since then, the event has raised nearly $2000 for charity and given people an opportunity to do something with their spare time at the convention.

In 2006 the first offshoot of this event was seen at Phoenix ConGames where 30,000 cards were used to build, donate, and destroy. Over 1000 cards were taken from the GenCon 2005 event and used to seed Phoenix ConGames 2006. The money raised ($276.00) at Phoenix ConGames was donated to a local orphanage.
