= The Mines of Bloodstone =

Dungeons & Dragons adventure module

- Code: H2
- TSR product code: 9168
- Rules required: AD&D
- Character levels: 16 - 18
- Campaign setting: Generic or Forgotten Realms
- Authors: Michael Dobson & Douglas Niles
- First published: 1986

Linked modules
- H1 H2 H3 H4

H2 The Mines of Bloodstone is an official game adventure or "module" for the Advanced Dungeons & Dragons (1st edition) fantasy role-playing game.

== Plot ==
The Mines of Bloodstone is an adventure in which the player characters travel through a blizzard to reach the Bloodstone Mines, through which they can get to the duergar kingdom of Deepearth, and the Temple of Orcus.

The adventure begins with a series of village encounters, before some further encounters and difficult weather in a big valley. The characters then proceed into the Mines of Bloodstone, where the duergar and svirfneblin are at war with each other, and then the characters proceed on to the duergar temple to the demon temple of Orcus. This is an attempt to gain an ancient treasure to help the beleaguered innocent citizens of Bloodstone Pass.

The module includes two battles between armies of gnomes and duergar for the Battlesystem rules.

== Publication history ==
The Mines of Bloodstone was written by Michael Dobson and Douglas Niles, with a cover by Keith Parkinson, and was published by TSR in 1986 as a 48-page booklet with an outer folder. Cover art was by Keith Parkinson, with interior art by Graham Nolan.

It is a sequel to H1 Bloodstone Pass which was originally a stand-alone adventure, but became the first in the four part Bloodstone Pass saga. This module continued the generic campaign setting of H1, although later modules in the series retconned Bloodstone into the Forgotten Realms.

The modules contains options for use of the Dungeoneer's Survival Guide and Wilderness Survival Guide game manuals, both new at the time. It also includes two battles where players command an army using the Battlesystem rules. For players without Battlesytem these battles can occur "off stage" while the players make a raid that otherwise occurs after the battles.

== Reception ==
John Saunders reviewed The Mines of Bloodstone for White Dwarf #88. The review was highly critical, with Saunders explaining that "Strong criticism requires justification in great detail." He called the encounters before the mines "time-wasting", the fight between the duergar and svirfneblin a "splatterfest", the temple of the duergar a "super-killer zoo dungeon", the adventure's climax "ultra-gross", and the whole adventure "just a gross dungeon bash". He also criticized the "well-stocked zoo" of many dozens of monsters encountered before the adventure's climax, and the fact that the many undead present cannot be turned. Saunders also felt the "treasure haul is equally gross", with millions of gold pieces and gems, noting that "Magical treasure is sprayed around like confetti." Saunders also complains that the module never tries to deal with the problems of high level play, such as how the DM should deal with powerful magic spells being used to upset the adventure's plot. He also felt it did not make sense for the script to assume that the players would attack the temple while the svirfnebli fight the duergar, as it is bad tactics to divide the forces and attack two sets of opponents simultaneously if the player characters can take them on sequentially. Saunders concluded the review by stating, "This effort is the best argument I've ever seen for retiring high-level AD&D characters. Quite appalling."

== See also ==
- List of Dungeons & Dragons modules
