= The Throne of Bloodstone =

Module for Advanced Dungeons & Dragons role-playing game

- Code: H4
- TSR product code: 9228
- Rules required: AD&D (1st Ed.); Battlesystem (optional)
- Character levels: 18 - 100
- Campaign setting: Forgotten Realms
- Authors: Michael Dobson; Douglas Niles
- First published: 1988

Linked modules
- H1 H2 H3 H4

H4 - The Throne of Bloodstone is an Official Game Adventure or "module" for the Advanced Dungeons & Dragons fantasy role-playing game.

== Plot summary ==
In The Throne of Bloodstone, the player characters go to the Abyss to steal the powerful Wand from Orcus.

This module is recommended for characters between levels 18 and 100. They play the rulers of Bloodstone Pass, where the battle between the mighty undead army of the Witch-King of Vaasa and the forces of Bloodstone has come to a standstill. The players venture into the Abyss and confront Orcus, one of its greatest demons. They must steal the Wand of Orcus, the true power behind the Witch-King, before taking it to the Seven Heavens to be destroyed.

The wide range of levels the module is for is dealt with in several ways. For some encounters either the number and/or type of opponents vary or the NPC's reaction to the characters vary depending on the total level of the party. Some areas in the module like the city of liches or the city of 100,000 demons, are really too difficult for any party to overcome directly and require approaches other than brute force.

== Publication history ==
H4 The Throne of Bloodstone was written by Douglas Niles and Michael Dobson, with a cover by Keith Parkinson, and was published by TSR in 1988 as a 96-page book. Interior art was by Graham Nolan.

This module is part four of four, though it is not required to have played the previous three modules. While this is the fourth adventure in the Bloodstone pass saga, and the second that sets the saga in the Forgotten Realms, it is the first publication that bears the official Forgotten Realms logo.

At 96 pages the module is larger than was common at the time of publication and is the longest in the Bloodstone Saga. It comes in a loose cardboard cover; the maps are not printed on the inside but in the book itself, and on a foldout poster.

This module is listed as being intended for character levels 18 - 100. The upper end of this range is by far the highest level specified for any D&D module. The module includes a substantial section on running games with 100th level characters. The guidance rests on three principles:

- 100th-Level characters are not ten times more powerful than 10th-level characters
- Apply all the rules strictly
- Never give a 100th-level character an even break

The module includes two sets of pre-generated characters. The first set is the same seven characters that have run through the Bloodstone Saga, most of which are now 19th level. The second set are based on great characters of mythology and all have at least one class at 100th level. These characters, who are much more powerful than the versions appearing in the Legends & Lore manual are Perseus, Circe, Hermes and Artemis.

== Reception ==
Lawrence Schick, in his 1991 book Heroic Worlds, found it strange that the module purports to be usable for character levels 18-100, "considering there are no rules for character levels above about 25 in AD&D".

== Table of contents ==
Chapter	Page
Prologue	9
Citadel of the Witch-King	12
Into the Abyss	30
Realm of the Undead	46
The Abyssian Fortress	57
Into the Seven Heavens	78
Epilogue	82

== Credits ==
Design: Michael Dobson and Douglas Niles
Editing:
Brand Manager:
Cover Art: Keith Parkinson
Interior Art:
Cartography:
Typesetting:
Art Direction:
Electronic Prepress Coordination:
Playtesters:

Distributed to the book trade in the United States by Random House, Inc., and in Canada by Random House of Canada, Ltd. Distributed to the toy and hobby trade by regional distributors. Distributed in the United Kingdom by TSR UK Ltd.

product number 9228
ISBN 0-88038-560-X

== Notable nonplayer characters ==
=== Opponents ===
To complete the adventure players will need to defeat many opponents. Those difficult or impossible to avoid include:

- Arctigis, a huge, ancient White Dragon.
- The Witch-King Zhengyi - a Lich with 30th level magic-user ability.
- 100 Type III Demons.
- Fyrillicus, the Abyssian Dragon - a Red Dragon larger than any found on the Prime Material Plane.
- Baphomet, a Demon Lord.
- Orcus, Lord of the Undead.
- Tiamat, the Chromatic Dragon.

Other major opponents characters may face include:

- Large numbers of Demons of all types, including large cities of hundreds of thousands of demons.
- the Tarrasque
- 10,000 Zombies
- 100 Liches, 12 Demiliches & 12 Death knights
- Various Lesser Gods and Demon Princes including:
  - Pazuzu, Prince of Lower Aerial Kingdoms (Demon Prince)
  - Charon
  - Demogorgon, Prince of Demons
  - Yeenoghu, Demon Prince of Gnolls
  - Lolth, Demon Queen of Spiders
  - Juiblex, the Faceless Lord (Demon Prince)
  - Urdlen, the Crawler Below (Lesser God)
  - Zuggtmoy, Demoness Lady of Fungi
  - Graz'zt (Demon Prince)
  - Fraz-Urb'luu, the Demon Prince of Deception
  - Kostchtchie (Demon Prince)
  - Kali, Goddess of Destruction
  - Vaprak, demigod of Trolls and Ogres
  - Laogzed, demigod of Troglodytes

== See also ==
- List of Dungeons & Dragons modules
