= Maztica Trilogy =

The Maztica Trilogy is a series of three fantasy novels that take place in the Forgotten Realms campaign setting of the Dungeons & Dragons fantasy role-playing game. The books are set in the fictional land of Maztica.

== Publication history ==
The series, written by Douglas Niles, consists of the following books:

- Ironhelm (1990)
- Viperhand (1990)
- Feathered Dragon (1991)

These books take place on the fictional continent of Maztica, within the Forgotten Realms setting. The name 'Maztica' is itself a portmanteau of "Maya" and "Aztec", two major civilizations in Central America.

== Plot summary ==
The plot of the trilogy closely mirrors the real-life discovery of the Americas by Christopher Columbus. The main character, Cordell, is similar in name to real-life conquistador Hernán Cortés. The "Conquistadors" in these stories originate from the empire of Amn in the Forgotten Realms. The states of Maztica, where the action occurs, resemble those of pre-Columbian Mesoamerica in that:

- they have (an advanced) Stone Age technology
- they worship many gods and offer human sacrifices
- they build large stone pyramids
- there is a warrior class with particular uniforms
- there is one powerful civilization dominating the continent, from which some tribes are independent and others subjugated

The principal difference is the existence of magic in the Dungeons & Dragons fantasy world.
