= The Bloodstone Wars =

Dungeons & Dragons game module

- Code: H3
- TSR product code: 9200
- Rules required: AD&D; Battlesystem (Recommended)
- Character levels: 17 - 20
- Campaign setting: Generic or Forgotten Realms
- Authors: Michael Dobson; Douglas Niles; Ed Greenwood
- First published: 1987

Linked modules
- H1 H2 H3 H4

H3 - The Bloodstone Wars is an Official Game Adventure or "module" for Advanced Dungeons & Dragons.

== Plot summary ==
The Bloodstone Wars consists of a Battlesystem scenario depicting a battle to rid a city of a bandit horde.

The module is designed for 1st edition AD&D and makes considerable use of some rules that were removed in 2nd edition, notably the assassin character class. There are two main parts of the module, the War itself which includes preparation and fighting out Battlesystem battles, and a small "dungeon" adventure which could occur at several points of the war. While the module provides alternatives for those who do not want to use miniatures to fight out the battles, the Battlesystem scenarios take a considerable portion of the module information.

== Publication history ==
H3 Bloodstone Wars was written by Douglas Niles and Michael Dobson, and published by TSR in 1987 as a 32-page booklet with a large color map and an outer folder. Cover art was by Larry Elmore.

While this is the third adventure in the Bloodstone pass saga it is the first publication that places The Barony of Bloodstone and surrounding kingdoms in the Forgotten Realms campaign. The module did not however bear the official Forgotten Realms logo.
