= Black Wizards =

1988 fantasy novel by Douglas Niles

- Author: Douglas Niles
- Language: English
- Series: The Moonshae Trilogy
- Genre: Epic fantasy
- Publisher: TSR, Inc.
- Publication date: April 1988
- Publication place: United States
- Media type: Print
- Preceded by: Darkwalker on Moonshae
- Followed by: Darkwell

Black Wizards is a fantasy novel by Douglas Niles that was published by TSR in 1988.

== Plot summary ==
Black Wizards is the second book in The Moonshae Trilogy, and continues to follow the adventures of Tristan Kendrick and his allies. The High King of Ffolk has fallen under the enchantments of seven evil wizards. Kendrick must raise an army to fight to forces of evil and claim his place on the throne as the King of the Isles.

== Publication history ==
TSR released Forgotten Realms, the new campaign setting for Dungeons & Dragons, in 1987, and provided various marketing and promotional crossovers, including several lines of paperback novels. The first of these was the three books of The Moonshae Trilogy by Douglas Niles: Darkwalker on Moonshae (May 1987), Black Wizards (April 1988), and Darkwell (February 1989). Niles followed these with another three books in 1992–1993, the Druidhome Trilogy.

== Reception ==
In the Io9 series revisiting older Dungeons & Dragons novels, Rob Bricken commented that "Like Darkwalker on Moonshae, Black Wizards is better written than some of the Dungeons & Dragons novels I've revisited on a technical level, but it doesn't have the focus of the first novel. As a result, it made me simultaneously angry and sleepy, which is sort of an impressive feat, but not one I feel interested in rewarding. So Black Wizards rolls a 4 on its 1d20, a point less than Darkwalker on Moonshae, but it should feel lucky I didn't make it roll with disadvantage. Seriously, this book made me very, very grumpy."

== Other reviews and commentary ==
- Backstab #6 (in French)
- Paperback Inferno #76, review by Andy Sawyer (1989)
