= Dramune Run =

Role-playing games supplement

Cover art by Keith Parkinson, 1984

Dramune Run is an adventure published by TSR in 1984 for the science fiction role-playing game Star Frontiers, and specifically for the spaceship game supplement Knight Hawks.

== Contents ==
The player characters are hired as the new crew of the Gullwind, a fast space freighter captained by Garlus Tylappar. Captain Tylappar has a cargo that, if successfully delivered to Dramune, will expose a serious crime being perpetrated by the local organized crime mob. When Tylappar dies, it is up to the crew to fight their way to Dramune and finish Tylappar's quest.

Six pre-generated characters are provided. The gamemaster must have a copy of Knight Hawks in order to run the ship-to-ship combats.

== Publication history ==
TSR published the science fiction role-playing game Star Frontiers in 1982, republished it as Alpha Dawn in 1983, and also released rules for spaceships and ship-to-ship combat the same year in the Knight Hawks supplement. Dramune Run, published in 1984, was the first adventure specifically written for use with Knight Hawks. The 32-page softcover book with tri-fold cover was written by Douglas Niles, with a cover by Keith Parkinson and illustrations by Clyde Caldwell.

== Reception ==
In Issue 15 of Imagine, Stephen Nutt was generally impressed, saying, "The general plot is sound. The players are presented with a number of problems, which in several cases have surprising twists at the end. The scenario is fast and there is plenty of combat." The only drawback of note was the inclusion of a deus ex machina that saves the player characters in the final encounter. But he concluded, "Overall, Dramune Run is a welcome addition to the Star Frontiers range."

== Other recognition ==
A copy of Dramune Run is held in the collection of the Strong National Museum of Play (object 110.2116).
