= Werner von Haeften =

German officer and conspirator against Hitler (1908–1944)

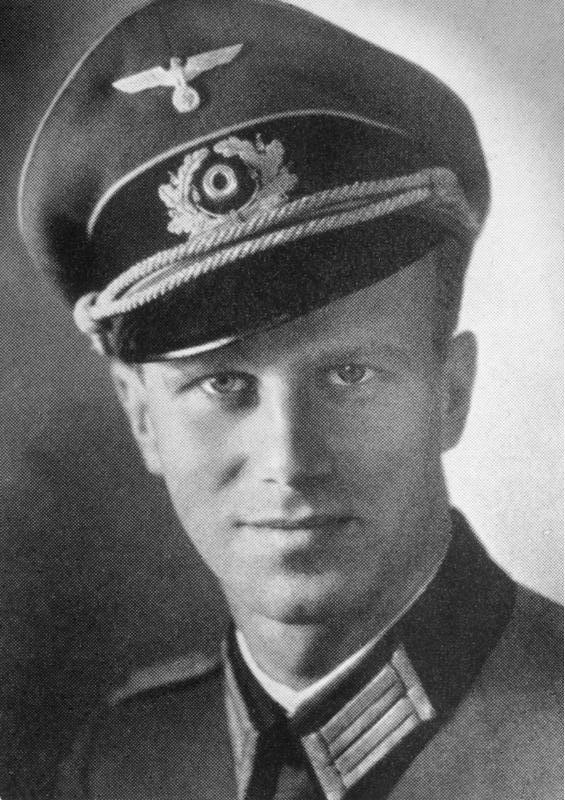
- Haeften in 1939
- Born: 9 October 1908; Berlin, German Empire
- Died: 21 July 1944 (aged 35); Berlin, Gau Berlin, Nazi Germany; 52.507892°N 13.36219°E
- Cause of death: Execution by firing squad
- Relatives: Walther von Brauchitsch (uncle); Hans Bernd von Haeften (brother)
- Military career
- Allegiance: Nazi Germany (to 1943); German resistance (to 1944)
- Branch: Wehrmacht
- Service years: 1939–1944
- Rank: Oberleutnant
- Conflicts: World War II

Werner Karl Otto Theodor von Haeften (9 October 1908 – 21 July 1944) was an Oberleutnant in the Wehrmacht who took part in the military-based conspiracy against Adolf Hitler known as the 20 July plot.

== Early life ==
Haeften and his brother Hans were born in Berlin, the sons of Hans von Haeften, an army officer and President of the Reichsarchiv (German National Archives). He studied law in his hometown and then worked for a bank in Hamburg until the outbreak of the Second World War when he joined the German Army.

== War service ==
In 1943, having recovered from a severe wound he had suffered on the Eastern Front, Haeften became adjutant to Oberst Claus Schenk Graf von Stauffenberg, one of the leading figures in the German Resistance.

On 20 July 1944, Haeften accompanied Stauffenberg to the military high command of the Wehrmacht near Rastenburg, East Prussia (now Kętrzyn, in Poland), where Stauffenberg planted a briefcase bomb in a conference room at Hitler's Wolfsschanze (Wolf's Lair) headquarters. After the detonation, Stauffenberg and Haeften rushed to Berlin and, not knowing that Hitler had survived the explosion, attempted to launch the long-planned coup d'état, which would swiftly fail.

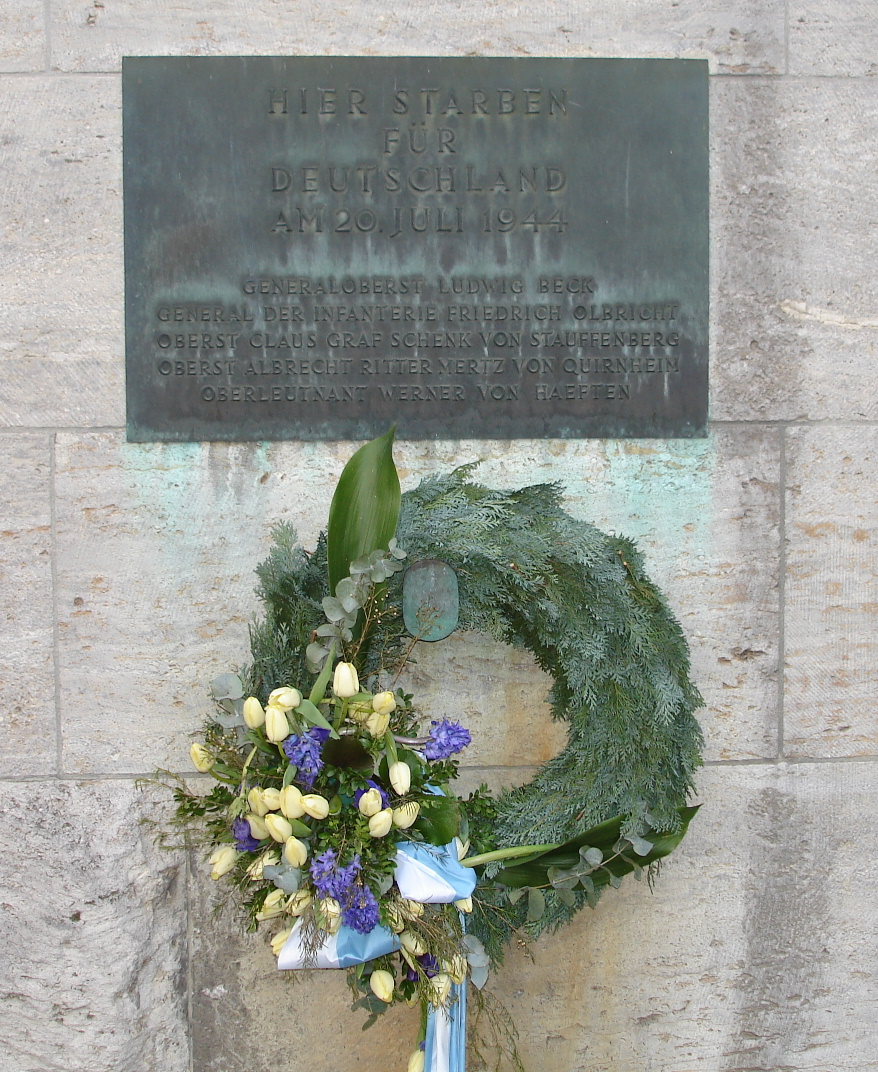
Memorial to von Haeften and four other conspirators at Bendlerblock.

On the same day, Haeften, along with Stauffenberg and fellow conspirators General Friedrich Olbricht and Oberst Albrecht Mertz von Quirnheim, was arrested after a summary court martial and sentenced to death by General Friedrich Fromm, who was himself later arrested and executed by the Nazi regime for his tacit complicity. All four plotters were shot after midnight by a ten-man firing squad from the Grossdeutschland Guards Battalion in the courtyard of the War Ministry, the Bendlerblock.

When Stauffenberg was about to be shot, in a last gesture of loyalty and defiance, Haeften placed himself in the path of the bullets meant for Stauffenberg.

Haeften's brother, Hans, who had also been involved in the anti-Hitler plot, was executed on 15 August at Plötzensee Prison.

== Awards and decorations ==
- Iron Cross of 1939, 1st and 2nd class
- Eastern Front Medal
- Wound Badge in Black

== Fictional portrayals ==
In the Eastern Bloc co-production Liberation: Direction of the Main Blow (1971), Haeften was depicted by the East German actor Hans-Edgar Stecher. In the German production Stauffenberg (2004), his part was played by the actor Hardy Krüger, Jr., and in the film Valkyrie (2008) he was portrayed by the British actor Jamie Parker.

In the 2000 alternate history novel Fox on the Rhine, the bomb delivered by Haeften and Stauffenberg succeeds in killing Hitler, but Heinrich Himmler avoids their attempts to arrest him and seizes control of the Third Reich (although his reign lasts for less than a year). While Beck, Olbricht, and many others ultimately flee, Haeften refuses to abandon Stauffenberg. When the SS arrive to arrest his superior, he opens fire at them with a pistol and attempts to shield Stauffenberg with his body before both men are gunned down. The sequel novel, Fox at the Front, mentions that his brother Hans-Bernd managed to escape to neutral territory and, along with other surviving plotters, has formed a government-in-exile.

== See also ==
- German Resistance
- List of members of the 20 July plot
