= The Moonshae Trilogy =

Fantasy novel series by Douglas Niles

The Moonshae Trilogy is a series of novels by Douglas Niles, set in the Forgotten Realms campaign setting. Darkwalker on Moonshae, the first novel in the series, was also the first published Forgotten Realms novel.

== Plot summary ==
The Moonshae Trilogy takes place on the Moonshae Isles, and involves a young prince on his way to unite all the people on the islands.

== Novels ==
- Darkwalker on Moonshae (paperback, May 1987, ISBN 978-0-88038-451-3; paperback re-issue, October 2004, ISBN 978-0-7869-3560-4)
- Black Wizards (paperback, April 1988, ISBN 978-0-88038-563-3; paperback re-issue, November 2004, ISBN 978-0-7869-3563-5)
- Darkwell (paperback, February 1989, ISBN 978-0-88038-717-0; paperback re-issue, December 2004, ISBN 978-0-7869-3566-6)

== Reception ==
The Moonshae Trilogy appeared on the 2024 Game Rant "31 Best Dungeons & Dragons Novels, Ranked" list at #19.

== Reviews ==
- Backstab #6
