= Fox on the Rhine =

2000 alternate history novel by Douglas Niles and Michael Dobson

- Author: Michael Dobson and Douglas Niles
- Cover artist: Tony Greco
- Language: English
- Genre: Alternate history, war
- Publisher: Tor Books
- Publication date: June 2000 (hardback); June 2002 (paperback)
- Publication place: United States
- Media type: Print (hardback & paperback)
- Pages: 546 pp
- ISBN: 0-8125-7466-4
- OCLC: 50016883
- Followed by: Fox at the Front

Fox on the Rhine is a 2000 alternate history novel written by Douglas Niles and Michael Dobson. It details a course of events over late 1944 that resulted from Adolf Hitler's death in the July 20 plot and from Field Marshal Erwin Rommel's survival of the crackdown.

== Plot summary ==
The book begins on July 20, 1944, when Colonel Claus von Stauffenberg successfully bombs the Wolfsschanze during a military conference and later executes Operation Valkyrie in Berlin. However, his decision to signal Adolf Hitler's death to other conspirators by code buys enough time for SS Reichsführer Heinrich Himmler to launch his own countercoup, Operation Reichssturm. While the Allies work to break out of Normandy through Operation Cobra, Field Marshal Erwin Rommel recovers from the injuries that he suffered during a real-life strafing run three days before the Stauffenberg coup. Himmler appoints him as commander of all German forces in Western Europe, under the watch from the SS, after Field Marshal Günther von Kluge dies in an air attack. He also believes that Carl-Heinrich von Stülpnagel's mention of Rommel as a possible conspirator holds no weight.

Back in Berlin, Himmler takes charge of the German government and sends Foreign Minister Joachim von Ribbentrop and Wehrmacht Colonel Gunther von Reinhardt to negotiate a peace treaty with the Soviet Union. The plan, Operation Carousel, calls for Germany to shift troops from the Eastern Front to the Western Front and to leave Eastern Europe and Scandinavia to the Soviets. The Nazis also agree to share missile technology with Moscow. The sudden implementation of the treaty angers the Allies, who promptly shift naval forces from the Pacific to the European Theater of Operations. Meanwhile, Rommel organizes a counterattack at Abbeville against the American 19th Armored Division by using units recovered from the Normandy front. He also orders the 19th Army to evacuate southern France ahead of Operation Dragoon and regroup at the Westwall.

Having identified all of the surviving July 20 conspirators, Himmler orders the SS to kill them, in some instances by posing as British Commandos. Luftwaffe General Adolf Galland is assigned to spearhead the development of the Me 262 fighter. Because of his concern for the troops, Rommel disagrees with Himmler about holding Metz as a strongpoint against the Allies. Himmler responds by sending SS troopers disguised as US soldiers to ambush a combat unit Rommel withdraws from the city.

Galland's efforts with the fighter program results in the mobilization of all surviving Luftwaffe units in a co-ordinated assault against an Allied bomber raid of almost 2,600 aircraft in November 1944. The attack so severely cripples the bomber force that the Allies are forced to suspend the bombing campaign of Germany. The postponement buys Rommel more time to boost his forces for a major offensive through the Ardennes. Although the operation is codenamed Wacht Am Rhein, von Reinhardt successfully proposes a change to Fuchs Am Rhein (Fox on the Rhine) to emphasize Rommel's role as the leader of the offensive. Heinz Guderian is also assigned to lead one of the two panzerarmees to be used in the operation, which aims to reach Antwerp.

Like the real-life Battle of the Bulge, the operation begins on the night of December 16, 1944. The capture of a major fuel dump at Stavelot allows the German forces to extend their advance much further than in the actual offensive, and they capture a bridge in Dinant to keep the momentum going. Field Marshal Montgomery, who successfully reinforced 21st Army Group's side of the Meuse River against a German crossing, is killed when German forces bombard his command post in Waterloo. The Germans also capture Bastogne.

Third Army commander General George Patton assigns the 19th Armored Division to counterattack against the Germans at Dinant and to destroy the bridges. The sudden appearance of the US forces prompts Rommel to send one division, which has already crossed back to Dinant, and to hold it with the Panzer Lehr Division, coming from the east. However, the Allies launch heavy air attacks against the Germans. The 19th Armored Division breaks through and destroys the bridges on December 26. Left without any option to refuel, all Wehrmacht units that have crossed the Meuse, Rommel decides to surrender Army Group B to Patton. An SS general tries to kill Rommel as he prepares to meet Patton, but one of the field marshal's assistants stops the assassin in time. Himmler sees the surrender as an opening for the SS to consolidate its grip on all surviving Wehrmacht units, and Joseph Stalin is pleased with the opportunity for a new attack since the Eastern Front is now almost clear of German forces.

=== Subplots ===
Other subplots in the novel include the adventures of a USAAF B-24 Liberator aircrew (explained through a crewmember's letters to his mother), a German-American US Army officer doing intelligence work, a Panther tank commander who eventually becomes Rommel's personal driver, an Associated Press reporter yearning for a position as field correspondent, and some officers in the US 19th Armored Division's Combat Command. A more general explanation of the story (and other in-universe events) is written in the novel through excerpts from a fictional history book, War's Final Fury by Professor Jared Gruenwald.

== Historical characters ==
=== Germans ===
- Adolf Hitler - German dictator and Nazi Führer
- Heinrich Himmler - Reichsführer-SS
- Joachim Peiper - Waffen-SS officer
- Sepp Dietrich - Waffen-SS general
- Erwin Rommel - Wehrmacht field marshal
- Hans Speidel - Rommel's chief of staff, member in plot to kill Hitler
- Fritz Bayerlein - Wehrmacht general
- Heinz Guderian - Wehrmacht general
- Joachim von Ribbentrop - Nazi Foreign Minister
- Colonel Claus von Stauffenberg- ringleader in the Bomb Plot
- Werner von Haeften - Stauffenberg's adjutant
- Carl Goerdeler - politician, member in plot to kill Hitler
- Adolf Galland - Luftwaffe General, fighter pilot, and ace
- Hermann Göring - Reichsmarshall, World War I hero, and next-in-line to become Führer

=== Allies ===
- Franklin D. Roosevelt - US President
- George Patton - American commander of the U.S. Third Army
- Omar Bradley - American commander of the U.S. First Army before Hodges
- Courtney Hodges - American commander of U.S. First Army who replaced Bradley
- Dwight D. Eisenhower - Supreme Commander of the Allied Forces in Europe
- Bernard Montgomery - British field marshal and commander of the 21st Army Group

=== Soviets ===
- Joseph Stalin - Soviet Premier
- Vyacheslav Molotov - Soviet Foreign Minister
- Georgy Zhukov - Marshal of the Soviet Union
- Nikolai Bulganin - politician
- Lavrentiy Beria - chief of the NKVD
