= Forgotten Realms: Heroes of Faerûn =

Dungeons & Dragons fantasy role-playing game source book

- Heroes of the Forgotten Realms: Karlach, Minsc, and Jarlaxle
- Rules required: Dungeons & Dragons, 5th edition
- First published: November 11, 2025
- ISBN: 9780786969937

Linked modules
- Forgotten Realms: Adventures in Faerûn

Forgotten Realms: Heroes of Faerûn is a sourcebook for the 5th edition of the Dungeons & Dragons fantasy role-playing game. The book includes options for players in the Forgotten Realms setting and information on regions, gods, magic and factions.

== Reception ==
A review for Screen Rant praised the usefulness for players, compared to other sourcebooks that are directed to the Dungeon Master, and singled out feats used for character building and circle magic, a cooperative magic option. However, it criticized the setting backstory as less useful than the information included in Forgotten Realms: Adventures in Faerûn.

A review for Wargamer praised the usefulness for storytelling and backstory detail; it names fans of the video game Baldur's Gate 3 as a target audience. It describes some new subclasses as excellent and circle magic as innovative but potentially bad for balance. The review criticized some character options as too niche and notes that many are not suited for low level playing.
