= Star Frontiers Referee's Screen and Mini-Module =

Role-playing game supplement

Cover art by Jeff Easley, 1983

Star Frontiers Referee's Screen and Mini-Module is a supplement published by TSR in 1983 for the science fiction role-playing game Star Frontiers.

== Contents ==
Star Frontiers Referee's Screen and Mini-Module provides a three-panel gamemaster's screen. On one side are tables and charts used by the gamemaster, and on the other side are the cover art and tables used by the players. Packaged inside the gamemaster's screen is an eight-page booklet titled "Assault of Starship Omicron" that includes two short adventures: "Sathar Attack Scenario" and "Rogue Robots Scenario".

In both scenarios, which can be played as separate or linked adventures, the characters are the security crew aboard the Omicron, which is being automatically navigated to a starport. In "Sathar Attack Scenario", the ship is attacked by a force of Sathar, a new alien race called the Zuraqqor, and a cybodragon. In "Rogue Robots Scenario", the Zuraqqor have infiltrated a robot onto the Omicron that has reprogrammed the ship's robots. The Zuraqqor now order the robots to take control of the ship.

Eight pre-generated characters are provided for the players.

== Publication history ==
TSR published the science fiction role-playing game Star Frontiers in 1982. Star Frontiers Referee's Screen and Mini-Module was released the following year. The included adventures were written by Mark Acres with Tom Moldvay. The cover art was by Jeff Easley.

== Reception ==
Jim Bambra reviewed Star Frontiers Referee's Screen and Mini-Module for Imagine magazine, and stated that "Now you can relax, confident that your 'secret' maps are safely hidden from prying eyes. If you take your refereeing seriously you cannot afford to be without it."
