= Darkwalker on Moonshae =

1987 fantasy novel by Douglas Niles

- Front cover, art by Keith Parkinson
- Author: Douglas Niles
- Language: English
- Series: The Moonshae Trilogy
- Genre: Epic fantasy
- Publisher: TSR, Inc.
- Publication date: May 1987
- Publication place: United States
- Media type: Print
- Pages: 380
- ISBN: 0-88038-451-4
- OCLC: 16320331
- Followed by: Black Wizards

Darkwalker on Moonshae is a fantasy novel by Douglas Niles and the first novel written for the Forgotten Realms campaign setting for the Dungeons & Dragons fantasy role-playing game. Published originally as a standalone novel, it is also the first part of The Moonshae Trilogy.

== Plot summary ==
The novel and its trilogy use the Moonshae Isles as its setting.

Kazgoroth, the Beast, has come into the world to destroy the power of the Earthmother. Changing its shape as needs be, the Beast goes across the island of Gwynneth, corrupting everything in its way. Its destination is a large gathering of Northmen raiders at Oman's Isle, in the middle of the Moonshaes, where they are preparing an assault on the kingdom of Corwell. The Northmen don't realize yet that this is going to be more than just a plundering raid. They don't know that their leader isn't King Thelgaar Ironhand, but the Beast, who has killed the king and assumed his shape.

Meanwhile, the Earthmother, aware of the danger and hurting from the corruption brought to the land, her body, by the vile presence of the Beast, awakes her children - the Leviathan, the Pack, and Kamerynn, the Unicorn. They will try to stop Kazgoroth in different ways, but that won't be enough.

At Caer Corwell, the seat of the king of Corwell, rumour brings word of war coming to the kingdom. Preparation is under way, but the Ffolk don't know where the enemy will strike. It is up to Tristan to organize the Ffolk against this both human and demonic threat. In his fight against the odds, helped by Robyn, he will grow into the responsible leader that should inherit his father's kingdom.

== Reception ==
In the Io9 series revisiting older Dungeons & Dragons novels, Rob Bricken commented that "as the first Forgotten Realms novel, it deserves some slack. I know a lot of people loved it back in the day, including myself, probably. Niles describes settings and action very well, which is no small feat."

== Reviews ==
- Backstab #6
- Kliatt
- Australian Realms #5
