= Suitors Duel =

Suitors Duel is a novel by Douglas Niles published by TSR in 1995.

== Plot summary ==
Suitors Duel is a novel involving the quest to find a goat whose udders produce wine rather than milk.

== Reception ==
Jonathan Palmer reviewed Suitors' Duel for Arcane magazine, rating it a 4 out of 10 overall. Palmer comments that "Written by an ex-high school teacher whose books have now sold over one million copies, this is a simplistic tale of treachery and love that will appeal to most of the younger members of his former pupilage. Nothing wrong with that, of course, but you have been warned."
