= Wand of Orcus =

Tabletop role-playing game magical weapon

The Wand of Orcus in the original Monster Manual (1977).

The Wand of Orcus is a fictional magical weapon described in various Dungeons & Dragons media. Because of the popularity of Orcus as a villain within the Dungeons & Dragons universe, many different authors have written materials describing artifacts created by or associated with the character. The Wand of Orcus is consistently the most important and most described of these artifacts. Screen Rant has noted that "[t]he weapon that Orcus wields in battle is almost as famous as the demon lord himself". Furthermore, the device has at times been employed in books, games, and other media within the franchise as a thing distinct from Orcus himself, such that adventurers may encounter the wand as a freestanding element of the game or story. Despite the tendency of the wand to appear at other places in the game, and in the possession of other monsters, it will generally be the primary weapon used by Orcus in encounters with that demon lord.

== Appearance and abilities ==
The Wand of Orcus is first presented in the Eldritch Wizardry supplement in 1976, by Gary Gygax and Brian Blume, for the original (white box) Dungeons & Dragons game. There, it is also called "the wand of death" or "Orcus's Wand", and is described as "a rod of obsidian topped by a skull. It was mentioned in the first Advanced Dungeons & Dragons Monster Manual by Gary Gygax, with an illustration by David C. Sutherland III on page 18. The wand was further detailed on page 162 of the 1979 Dungeon Masters Guide, also by Gygax, in the section on treasure (artifacts and relics). Another illustration of the wand appears on page 101 of the second edition boxed set Planes of Chaos (1994) by Lester Smith and Wolfgang Baur for the Planescape setting, in the section on Pandemonium. Third edition game statistics for the wand appear in the Book of Vile Darkness (2002) by Monte Cook, on page 122. The Wand of Orcus appears in the 5th edition Dungeon Master's Guide (2014).

The adventure Dead Gods describes the wand as "a 3-foot long iron scepter with a human skull set into one end", while the Book of Vile Darkness describes the wand, with third edition statistics, as a "black obsidian and iron rod" which is "topped with the skull of a human hero slain by Orcus". The fourth edition Monster Manual describes the wand as "a heavy mace tipped with an enormous skull" and states that its smooth obsidian haft is studded with blood rubies.

This instrument causes "death (or annihilation) to any creature" by touching it to their flesh, except for creatures of like status to Orcus himself. The Encyclopedia Magica Volume Four adds to the description from Eldritch Wizardry that an attempt by a character other than Orcus to use the wand to annihilate another creature only has a 50% chance of being successful, and the user will be subjected to a curse each time this is tried. The fourth edition Monster Manual states that the wand "transforms those it slays into undead horrors". In addition to the damage it dispenses, the Encyclopedia Magica states that the wand also bestowed the magical abilities to move at double speed, cure light wounds once per day, speak with animals, or cause a serious wound. The Book of Vile Darkness also notes that Orcus himself is "best known in some circles for his wand, an artifact of malefic might", and notes that the wand is more accurately described as a rod, and it also serves as his symbol. He relies heavily on his wand in combat, and prefers to kill foes in melee with it. The wand "has the ability to steal the souls of those it touches", and is particularly useful against groups of adventurers because "each party member slain by the power of the Wand of Orcus will return as a wraith".

In addition, the wand "communicates silently with its wielder, in Abyssal, using brutal and gory imagery to highlight its blood-soaked ends".

== Use in gaming ==
The first edition Dungeon Masters Guide notes that while this "ghastly weapon" is the property of Orcus, "at times it is said that he will allow his wand to pass into the Prime Material Plane in order to wreak chaos and evil upon all living things there." The Book of Vile Darkness similarly notes that Orcus sometimes allows mortals to obtain the wand so that they may spread chaos and evil, but adds that he grows bored after only a year or so and reclaims his wand and usually the soul of the mortal who wielded it as well. Within the mechanics of the game, the artifact has been described as overpowered to the point that it has "the potential to inadvertently derail a campaign".

In the adventure The Throne of Bloodstone, first published in 1988, the player characters are able to obtain the Wand of Orcus, and flee with it from the Abyss to the Seven Heavens. If the characters decide to keep the Wand of Orcus instead, the party members begin to fall under its evil influence and stop at nothing to possess it; any character who travels to an empty plane of the Abyss with the wand can set up a layer under his own rule, and after 30 days he will irrevocably become a demon lord. When the characters meet Bahamut, the Platinum Dragon, he tells them that the Wand of Orcus can only be destroyed if it is "steeped in the black and foul blood from the heart of Tiamat, the Queen of Darkness", although if killed Tiamat and the wand will be removed from the current plane of existence for centuries, but will eventually return to existence. If the characters succeed, the wand explodes violently, leaving only a small white gem. Bahamut tells them to plant this gem and tend the tree that comes from it: "For as long as you and your realm align with the cause of Good, this tree will prevent any demons from entering the Kingdom of Bloodstone. But should you, your people, or your descendents turn to Evil, the tree will wither, and the demons take a most powerful revenge." The adventure's epilogue notes that while the Tree-Gem of Bloodstone keeps Orcus from entering the lands, it will take him a full century to rebuild the Wand of Orcus.

The Wand is briefly mentioned in the adventure Reverse Dungeon (2000) by John D. Rateliff and Bruce R. Cordell. In this adventure, the wizard Blaise constructed a vault centuries ago to house his "collection" of unusual monsters, forcing each to guard a treasure. One of these treasures was the Wand of Orcus guarded by a shade, although the wand had gone missing by the time of the adventure. The shade had been slain long ago, and the wand was stolen, leaving behind "a velvet-lined case on a crystal stand bearing the impression of the skull-headed wand that once rested within". The adventure states that the wand was since reclaimed from the looters by its rightful owner, "as Master Blaise knew it would be".

The booklet The Dark of the War in Hellbound: The Blood War reveals that when Orcus was either deposed or slain by Kiaransalee, his wand was locked away in Agathion, the fourth layer of Pandemonium. Game statistics for the aspect of Orcus in the Miniatures Handbook (2003) on pages 53–54 state that the aspect "wields a weaker version of Orcus's famous wand". Dungeons & Dragons 4th Edition for Dummies describes the Wand of Orcus as being part of what makes Orcus "the most monstrous evil in the game".

== Creation ==
The adventure Dead Gods provides the backstory for how Orcus created the wand. Long ago, he trapped the spirit of a mighty hero named Anarchocles within a circlet of control for a skeleton warrior, and safeguarded the item to keep it from being used against him. When Anarchocles died, Orcus removed the skull from his destroyed corpse, and placed it on the end of a long iron scepter, infusing it with some of Orcus's own essence, thus creating the Wand of Orcus. A character wearing the circlet can see through the eyes of the skull when within a few hundred feet. If the circlet is touched to the skull, both the circlet and the wand turn to dust. Anarchocles is aware of what happens outside the circlet, and if he senses that the wand is near, he will force the characters to touch the circlet to the skull, thus destroying both items and granting Anarchocles eternal rest. If the player characters are able to restore the memories of the drow Erehe, he can tell them how Kiaransalee brought him and the drow Kestod to a cavern in a secluded area of Agathion.

The player characters can find the wand in Agathion, in the Reliquary, the central cavern of a complex of caves, protected by invisible barriers. The wand is still intelligent and extraordinarily powerful despite being weakened since the death of Orcus, and created the maze of caverns that stretch outward from this cavern hoping that it might be found. The wand can be found sitting upon a pedestal in the center of the cavern. Any character that makes the conscious choice to touch the circlet to the skull is destroyed along with the items, unless he concentrates on controlling the wand before touching it. Anarchocles feels an insane sense of revenge for his imprisonment, and wants to kill anyone he can, especially anyone in possession of the circlet. If the characters find the wand but are not in possession of the circlet, they can send the wand away either by using great magic, or they can accomplish the same feat if one of the characters sacrifices his own life to reactivate the wand's ability to shift from one plane to another. Tenebrous is being eaten up from the inside by the power of the Last Word, so he will die if he doesn't find the Wand of Orcus in Agathion, assuming the characters destroyed the wand or sent it away.

According to the fourth edition Monster Manual, some legends say that the skull atop the wand "once belonged to a god of virtue and chivalry who dared challenge Orcus in battle" while other legends identify it as the skull of a human hero, implying that it was magically enlarged to its current size; regardless, the goodness that once resided in this skull has been warped and perverted to monstrous evil.

== In other media ==
The depiction of the Wand of Orcus in the Monster Manual was used by Richard Garfield in the development phase of his trading card game Magic: The Gathering for the prototype of the Rod of Ruin card.
