= Star Frontiers =

Science fiction tabletop role-playing game

Exciting Adventure on Alien Worlds
- Cover by Larry Elmore
- Designers: TSR Staff, Edited by Steve Winter
- Publishers: TSR
- Publication: 1982; 44 years ago
- Genres: Science fiction
- Systems: Custom

Star Frontiers is a science fiction role-playing game produced by TSR from 1982 to 1985. The game offers a space opera action-adventure setting.

== Description ==
Star Frontiers is a space opera role-playing game that is set near the center of a spiral galaxy (the setting does not specify whether the galaxy is our own Milky Way). A previously undiscovered quirk of the laws of physics allows starships to jump to "The Void", a hyperspatial realm that greatly shortens the travel times between inhabited worlds, once they reach 1% of the speed of light. Four races — Dralasite, Humans, Vrusk, and Yazirian — have independently discovered this way of travelling vast distances, and in "The Frontier Sector", they form the United Planetary Federation (UPF). A large number of the star systems shown on the map of the Frontier sector in the basic rulebook are unexplored and undetailed, allowing the gamemaster to put whatever they wish there.

Players can take on any number of possible roles in the setting but usually act as hired agents of the Pan Galactic corporation in exploring the Frontier and fighting the aggressive incursions of the alien and mysterious worm-like race known as the Sathar. Most published modules for the game follow these themes.

The game is a percentile-based system and uses only 10-sided dice. Characters have eight attributes rated from 1-100, which are paired together: Strength/Stamina, Dexterity/Reaction Speed, Intuition/Logic, and Personality/Leadership.

Characters also each have a Primary Skill Area (PSA), either Military, Technological, or Biosocial. Character generation uses a point-buy system to buy skills; skills falling within a character's PSA can be bought at a discount. Unlike TSR's better-known fantasy role-playing game Dungeons & Dragons, there is no character level advancement in Star Frontiers, although skills can be improved through experience.

Because of the lack of magical healing found in fantasy RPGs, characters are quite durable in combat. Medical technology is also advanced, so characters can recover quickly from wounds with appropriate medical attention. Additionally, a dead character can be "frozen" and revived later.

The original boxed set includes two ten-sided dice, a large set of cardboard counters, and a folding map with a futuristic city on one side and various wilderness areas on the other. The box also includes the first Star Frontiers adventure, SF-0: Crash on Volturnus. The characters would remain marooned on Volturnus through the next few modules: SF-1: Volturnus, Planet of Mystery (1982) and SF-2: Starspawn of Volturnus (1982)

In his 2023 book Monsters, Aliens, and Holes in the Ground, RPG historian Stu Horvath noted that during this time on Volturnus, "Strangely, Star Frontiers, a science fiction game about space exploration, went two years without rules for spaceships."

(Rules for spaceships and space combat finally appeared in 1983, with the boxed set titled Knight Hawks.)

== Publication history ==
Although TSR was a pioneer in developing science fiction role-playing games like the generation ship game Metamorphosis Alpha (1976) and the post-apocalyptic Gamma World (1978), they didn't immediately publish a space opera to rival Game Designer's Workshop's very popular Traveller (1977). Then in the early 1980s, David Cook and Lawrence Schick developed the rules for a TSR game they called Alien Worlds. Those rules turned out to be too complex, and Cook and Schick severely edited the game to produce a more streamlined system — a 1984 article in Dragon noted that much of the material excised from Alien Worlds "was felt to be too complex; playability was emphasized in the final version over complete realism." The revised game was titled Star Frontiers and was published by TSR in 1982.

In 1983, Mike Gray, Allen Hammack, Harold Johnson, David C. Sutherland III, and Steve Winter revised and expanded the game; this was released as Star Frontiers: Alpha Dawn. About the same time, TSR released Knight Hawks (1983), designed by Douglas Niles, which provided rules for using starships, and for starship combat.

TSR released several more adventures to take advantage of the expanded rules in Alpha Dawn, including SF-3: Sundown on Starmist (1983), SF-4: Mission to Alcazzar (1984), SF-5: Bugs in the System (1985) and SF-6: Dark Side of the Moon (1985).

Adventures using the Knight Hawks spaceship rules included SFKH-1: Dramune Run (1984) and a trilogy set "Beyond the Frontier" in which the players learn more about the Sathar and foil their latest plot (SFKH-2: Mutiny on the Eleanor Moraes (1984), SFKH-3: Face of the Enemy (1985), and SFKH-4: The War Machine (1985)).

Star Frontiers Character Record Sheets, cover art by Larry Elmore, 1984

In addition to adventures, several game aids were released, including the Star Frontiers Referee's Screen and Mini-Module in 1983, and the Star Frontiers Character Record Sheets in 1984, a 32-page book of character sheets with cover art by Larry Elmore.

Two modules published in 1984 also re-created the plot and setting of the movies 2001: A Space Odyssey and 2010: Odyssey Two.

In 1985, TSR signalled a new expansion to the game by publishing Zebulon's Guide to Frontier Space (1985) which introduced several additional races and radical changes to the game's mechanics. Although several more volumes were planned, they were never published, as TSR abruptly ended support for the Star Frontiers game. Various reasons for this sudden termination have been proposed — RPG historian Stu Horvath presented the possibility that TSR was angling to gain the game license for Star Wars and "ditched Star Frontiers on the hubristic assumption they could outbid the competition." Whether or not this was the reason, TSR ultimately lost a bidding war for the Star Wars rights to West End Games.

=== d20 Modern ===
After TSR's takeover by Wizards of the Coast (WotC), the Star Frontiers campaign setting was resurrected and updated for WotC's d20 Modern role-playing game system in the science fiction supplement d20 Future (2004); the new revision was titled Star Law.

== Reception ==
In Issue 37 of White Dwarf, Andy Slack stated that "Unfortunately, I can't say the system struck me as especially realistic; but if you like action adventure, thinking with your fists, and Star Wars (and who doesn't from time to time) you can have a lot of fun with this game." Slack concluded by giving it an overall rating of 7 out of 10.

In the February 1983 issue of The Space Gamer, William A. Barton commented, "Star Frontiers probably isn't going to lose TSR any money. But I wish there were a lot more to commend it than that."

In the inaugural issue of TSR's UK role-playing game magazine Imagine, Jim Bambra liked the game, saying, "In summary, the Starfrontiers game is an excellent introduction to Sci Fi gaming, a game I heartily recommend to beginners and experienced gamers. A lot of expertise has gone into the designing of this product and the result is a very enjoyable and easy to learn game."

Ian R. Beste reviewed Star Frontiers for Different Worlds magazine and stated that "It would be easy to say that Star Frontiers is just D&D with lasers. It isn't exactly, but it's unlikely to make anyone drop their existing campaign to set up one for Star Frontiers. This game just don't have a solid science fiction feel to it."

In the November 1983 issue of Asimov's Science Fiction, Dana Lombardy commented, "Warning: these games can be addictive! Successfully completing an adventure (which sometimes means simply surviving!), or having your character obliterated in one of them, will probably make you want to play even more challenging adventures. TSR has a lot to offer the novice and experienced SF gamer in Star Frontiers."

Also writing for Imagine, Stephen Nutt reviewed Star Frontiers Character Record Sheets, and stated that "it makes up handsomely for the originals in the boxed set, which are rather pedestrian in comparison."

The French games magazine Jeux & Stratégie dismissed this game as fantasy masquerading as science fiction, commenting, "The fact remains that it is simply a transfer of D&D into a sci-fi world. We find the same type of scenarios, the monsters being replaced by extraterrestrial life forms, and the elves by Yazirians."

In Issue 30 of the French games magazine Casus Belli, Jean Bolczesak liked the game but found its science fiction content a bit simplistic, commenting, "Star Frontiers is playable, interesting and ESPECIALLY entertaining. But Star Frontiers is a game that presents a rather caricatured vision of science fiction. Since Dick and Herbert, SF is no longer necessarily a literary genre reserved for the simple-minded and the mentally ill. You can be passionate about space opera without being completely stupid." Bolczesak also pointed out the lack of content about spaceships and planet creation. Despite this, Bolczesak concluded, "Star Frontiers is not a bad game, however, far from it. To be honest, it is even excellent for all 'dungeoners' who dream of exploring the galaxy. Especially if they like action and sci-fi, but not 'hard science'."

In his 1990 book The Complete Guide to Role-Playing Games, game critic Rick Swan called Star Frontiers "a streamlined, easy-to-learn game stressing general concepts while minimizing complicated mechanics." Swan concluded by giving the game a solid rating of 3 out of 4 and a qualified recommendation, saying, "It's an excellent game for beginners, but experienced players may be disappointed that it lacks the scope of more elaborate science-fiction games such as MegaTraveller."

Scott Taylor revisited Star Frontiers several times for Black Gate:

- In 2014, Taylor listed the Star Frontiers Alpha Dawn boxed set by Larry Elmore as #9 in The Top 10 TSR Cover Paintings of All Time.
- In a retrospective review of Star Frontiers in 2020, Taylor said "Frontiers, in my opinion, is a 'clean' game, which is to say there aren't any rough edges, shadowed pasts, massive interstellar threats, plagues, or the like. It's like a perfect joining of Star Trek and Star Wars, where characters find themselves challenged to explore new worlds while still dealing with a handful of alien races as trusted friends." In another review for Black Gate, Patrick Kanouse said "Star Frontiers remains a playable and enjoyable game. A group of devoted fans have kept the game alive and expanded on it, so if you're looking for an easy-to-learn RPG with a focus on action, give it a go. I think you may like the retrofuture it inhabits."
- In 2015, Taylor rated the Volturnus series as #5 in "The Top 10 Campaign Adventure Module Series of All Time, saying "Acres & Moldvay spin a nice thread that pervades all of the Star Frontiers universe with the additions of SF1 Volturnus, Planet of Mystery and SF2 Starspawn of Volturnus."

== Subsequent legal dispute over trademark ==
In 2021, a new iteration of TSR Games was launched by a group including Ernie Gygax, son of the deceased Tactical Studies Rules (TSR) co-founder Gary Gygax, and Justin LaNasa. They announced plans to release tabletop games and operate the Dungeon Hobby Shop Museum, which is located in the first office building of the original TSR. In July 2022, TechRaptor reported on a leaked Star Frontiers: New Genesis (a reboot of Star Frontiers) playtest created by LaNasa's TSR; the content contains "blatantly racist" descriptions of character races and the race design "plays into Nazi eugenics". The content also contains "homophobic, transphobic, and anti-semitic content, as well as additional material of a discriminatory nature". IGN Southeast Asia highlighted that in this playtest game a black "race is classified as a 'Subrace' and having 'average' intellect with a maximum intelligence rating of 9, whereas the 'norse' race has a minimum intelligence rating of 13".

In September 2022, Wizards of the Coast sued TSR Games and the Dungeon Hobby Shop Museum to enjoin these companies from publishing games under the "Star Frontiers" and "TSR" trademarks. In its motion for a preliminary injunction, Wizards of the Coast wrote that TSR's Star Frontiers: New Genesis game is "despicable" and "blatantly racist and transphobic", and that the publication of such content would inflict reputational harm on Wizards of the Coast. Charlie Hall, for Polygon, commented that "Wizards' filing also seeks to undermine LaNasa's most powerful argument — that Wizards abandoned TSR and other related trademarks, thus opening the door to his usurping of the brand and its games. [...] Here's where things get complicated. Wizards admits that it failed to file paperwork for the registration of TSR, Star Frontiers, and other related marks in a timely fashion as required under federal law. But through continued sales of related products and use of the related IP, the company claims ownership via 'common law trademark rights.' It will be up to a jury to determine if that is, in fact, the case."
