= Sundown on Starmist =

Role-playing game supplement

Cover art by Clyde Caldwell, 1983

Sundown on Starmist is an adventure published by TSR in 1983 for the space opera role-playing game Star Frontiers.

== Description ==
Some time ago, Maximillian Malligigg was a crew member on a ship that was forced to land on the unexplored ice planet Starmist populated by a race called Heliopes who have a low level of technology. While the ship was being repaired, Malligigg discovered a piece of an advanced alloy, beyond the capability of the Heliopes to create. Back on a civilized planet, Malligigg wants to return to search for more pieces of advanced technology, and has hired the player characters to join his private expedition. During the adventure, the player characters will have to rescue their employer after he is kidnapped, and will encounter an outpost inhabited by their evil nemesis, the Sathar.

== Publication history ==
TSR published the space opera role-playing game Star Frontiers in 1982, (re-titled as Alpha Dawn in 1983), and then released a number of adventures. The third adventure, published in 1983 was Sundown on Starmist, a 32-page book with tri-fold cover written by Garry Spiegle, with interior art by Jim Roslof, cartography by Dave "Diesel" LaForce, and cover art by Clyde Caldwell.

== Reception ==
Stephen Nutt reviewed Sundown on Starmist for Imagine magazine, and stated that "Starmist uses a simple and old theme, yet the designer has managed to add various twists and quirks, both in the way of gadgets and plot, that make Starmist a real challenge and not a scenario that becomes predictable and dull."

== Other recognition ==
A copy of Sundown on Starmist is held in the collection of the Strong National Museum of Play (object 110.2115).
