= Bloodstone Pass =

Dungeons & Dragons adventure module

- Code: H1
- TSR product code: 9122
- Rules required: AD&D & Battlesystem
- Character levels: 15+
- Campaign setting: Generic or Forgotten Realms
- Authors: Douglas Niles; Michael Dobson
- First published: 1985

Linked modules
- H1 H2 H3 H4

H1 Bloodstone Pass is an adventure module for the first edition of the Advanced Dungeons & Dragons (D&D) fantasy role-playing game. It was written by Douglas Niles and Michael Dobson and published by TSR, Inc., in 1985. While it contained some traditional D&D elements, the main portion of the module was a series of mass battles using the D&D Battlesystem.

== Plot summary ==
Bloodstone Pass is an adventure with both a role-playing scenario and Battlesystem combat, in which the town of Bloodstone Pass hires the player characters to organize a defense against an army of evil humanoid monsters. The army also included human renegades led by a powerful assassin.

The module's action focuses on leading the armies rather than having the battle occur in the background while the players adventure to find a MacGuffin.

== Publication history ==
Bloodstone Pass was originally the working name of what became the first edition of Battlesystem. However, it was felt that the name did not convey the feeling of the system. After the developers had settled on the name Battlesystem, they used the "Bloodstone Pass" name for the first Battlesystem game accessory.

Bloodstone Pass was written by Douglas Niles and Michael Dobson and published by TSR, Inc., in 1985 as a boxed set. The set included a 32-page scenario booklet, a 24-page unit roster, a model-building instruction booklet, 12 cardstock building sheets for constructing a fold-together cardboard village and miniature figures, and 104 cardboard counters. Cover art was by Jeff Easley.

Originally intended as a stand-alone module, it later became the first part of the four-part Bloodstone Pass Saga. The saga is known as the H series and includes Bloodstone Pass (H1), The Mines of Bloodstone (H2), The Bloodstone Wars (H3), and The Throne of Bloodstone (H4). When The Bloodstone Wars was published, the original generic setting of Bloodstone Pass was retconned into the Forgotten Realms campaign setting. Module FR9, The Bloodstone Lands, describes the area of the Forgotten Realms where the Bloodstone Pass Saga occurs. In this module's version of history the events of H series modules have run their course with the pregenerated PCs.

== Reception ==
Ken Rolston reviewed Bloodstone Pass for Dragon magazine #135 (July 1988). He called it a "real nice package" but noted that, because it was designed for use with Battlesystem, "the buildings are not even close to 25mm scale".

Rich Baker, one of the designers of the 2006 module Red Hand of Doom, compared that adventure to Bloodstone Pass, saying they provide similar challenges to players.
