= War of the Worlds: New Millennium =

2005 novel by Douglas Niles

- First cover to the novel War of the Worlds: New Millennium by Douglas Niles.
- Author: Douglas Niles
- Cover artist: Julie Bell
- Language: English
- Genre: Science fiction novel
- Publisher: Tor Books
- Publication date: June 2005
- Publication place: United States
- Media type: Print (Hardcover)
- Pages: 332 pp (first edition, hardback)
- ISBN: 0-7653-1142-9 (first edition, hardback)
- OCLC: 57692736
- Dewey Decimal: 813/.54 22
- LC Class: PS3564.I375 W36 2005

War of the Worlds: New Millennium is a science fiction novel by Douglas Niles, released in 2005 by Tor Books.

After the most recent uncrewed mission to Mars inexplicably fails, interest in the Red Planet is still high. The whole world watches as a bright spot of light appears daily on the Martian surface. As they continue, theories abound about what is causing it. Telescopes pick up movement in space: something came from Mars and is headed towards Earth.

As explained in the Author's Note of the novel, H. G. Wells wrote the original 1897 The War of the Worlds prior to any modern military conflict (such as World War I or World War II). This novel is the Martian invasion of Earth in 2005, in effect updating the Martians and the military’s actual and doctrinal responses.

== Plot summary ==
After a remote Mars Rover (Vision) loses contact with Earth, a series of flashes appear on the face of Mars, once every Martian day (24 hours, 37 minutes). The flashes baffle scientists at first, until strange objects are discovered heading towards Earth. A Space Shuttle is sent out to investigate, and becomes the first casualty in the Martian attack on Earth.

The first of the eleven objects sends out a 1 million volt electromagnetic pulse (EMP) which becomes known simply as the Pulse. The first pulse covers North America, and knocks out all computer circuitry and most sophisticated electronics. The second and third objects contain EMPs for Eurasia and Antarctica, effectively immobilizing the world. The remaining objects release canisters which plummet to Earth and strategically impact around major population centers.

As planes crash and cars stop, Alex DeVane tries to get to NASA headquarters to deal with the Pulse and what it means. After the canisters hit, and bombing appears to have no effect, the United States Army sends out an infantry division to investigate and attack the aliens. The canister opens, and the Martians exit in armored saucers held up on tractor beam-like legs. They are also armed with lasers that burn through anything they touch. The ring of tanks, infantry, and artillery fire on the Martians, but to no effect. They destroy the group and continue the invasion.

The U.S. Army rallies and fights bravely, but loses every battle. The Martians also have a poison gas weapon that lasts about 30 minutes, but is lethal. They destroy and kill for the sake of doing so, and seem to breathe in the death and destruction they are causing.

Ironically, this smell leads doctors and scientists to speculate on the nature of the Martians, and the large amount of bacteria they seem to thrive upon. Although successful with nuclear weapon attacks, the Americans try a penicillin/antibiotic bomb, which seems to stop the landers after only a slight delay. Further experimentation by Markus DeVane later proves that any bread-based mold will quickly put down a Martian. This solution is communicated to the survivors, and the invasion is stopped.

== Characters ==
- Alex DeVane – Project manager for the Manned Mission to Mars program.
- Mark DeVane – Father of Alex, former professor, and expert on Mars
- Duke Hayes – A-10 Warthog pilot
- Nate Hayes – space shuttle pilot, brother to Duke Haye

== Allusions/references to other works ==
This novel is an "update" to the H.G. Wells classic The War of the Worlds. As noted in the Author’s Note^{[1]}, the one supposition made is that the original novel could never have appeared for the New Millennium novel to work.

== Allusions/reference to actual history, geography and current science ==
- The early uncrewed mission to Mars are mentioned as happening prior to the Vision rover mission.
- In North Korea, the army there launches a nuclear missile at a group of Martian landers.
- A nuclear attack by Pakistan on the landers causes a retaliatory strike by India.

== Release details ==
- 2005, U.S.A., Tor Books ISBN 0-7653-1142-9, Pub date June 2005, Hardcover
