= Forgotten Realms: Adventures in Faerûn =

Role-playing game adventure

- Rules required: Dungeons & Dragons, 5th edition
- Character levels: 1-13
- First published: November 11, 2025
- ISBN: 9780786969951

Linked modules
- Forgotten Realms: Heroes of Faerûn

Forgotten Realms: Adventures in Faerûn is an adventure module anthology for the 5th edition of the Dungeons & Dragons fantasy role-playing game. The book includes short adventures for the Forgotten Realms regions of the Dalelands, Icewind Dale, Calimshan, the Moonshae Isles, and Baldur's Gate, as well as the adventure The Lost Library of Lethchauntos.

== Reception ==
A review for Screen Rant praised the diversity and ideas of adventures included in the first chapter, and notes that the book is the first detailed source for the Forgotten Realms in Dungeons & Dragons 5th edition. However, it notes that the adventures are sketches that need work by the Dungeon Master and players to be useful.

A review for Polygon praised the information on places and events in the featured regions, which can be used as adventure hooks, and the number of maps. It singles out the chapter for Icewind Dale as an excellent addition to the information included in Icewind Dale: Rime of the Frostmaiden. However, it describes the content on Calimshan and the Moonshae Islands as inferior. The reviewer states that the content in this book and Forgotten Realms: Heroes of Faerûn should have been combined, that the suggestions on running adventures are of bad quality, and that the short adventures in the book are too basic and a Dungeon Master should make new adventures instead.
