= Winterheim =

2003 novel by Douglas Niles

- Cover of the first edition
- Author: Douglas Niles
- Language: English
- Series: Dragonlance / Icewall
- Genre: Fantasy novel
- Set in: Dragonlance
- Published: 2003 by Wizards of the Coast
- Publication place: United States
- Media type: Print
- Pages: 312 pp
- ISBN: 0-7869-2911-1
- OCLC: 51297646
- Dewey Decimal: 813.54
- LC Class: PS3564.I375
- Preceded by: The Golden Orb

Winterheim is a fantasy novel by Douglas Niles, set in the world of Dragonlance, and based on the Dungeons & Dragons role-playing game. It is the third novel in the "Icewall" trilogy. It was published in paperback in January 2003.

== Plot summary ==
Strongwind Whalebone is the king of the people known as the Highlanders, and the ogres have taken him prisoner in their stronghold, while Grimwar Bane the ogre king deals with royal treachery as well as revolt from within.

== Reception ==
Reviewer Don D'Ammassa wrote that, especially compared to Niles' other novels, the story is "a bit too simplistic and routine."
