= Mutiny on the Eleanor Moraes =

Role-playing game adventure

Mutiny on the Eleanor Moraes is a 1984 role-playing game adventure for Star Frontiers published by TSR.

== Plot summary ==
Mutiny on the Eleanor Moraes is an adventure in which the player characters are surveying a planet with great potential as part of an exploration mission, when their ship crash lands.

== Reception ==
Jerry Epperson reviewed Mutiny on the Eleanor Moraes in Space Gamer No. 70. Epperson commented that "Mutiny is aimed at the novice Star Frontiers GM who may be looking for an interesting twist for a dying campaign. Others will also find this adventure instructive, but not nearly as much as a beginner will. It is far and away the best Star Frontiers module currently available . . . though that's not saying much."

Stephen Nutt reviewed Mutiny on the Eleanor Moraes for Imagine magazine, and stated that "Eleanor Moraes is [...] constrained by its very nature. If all goes according to plan, it will be exciting; If not, a great disappointment. However, if the players do succeed I would not like to be the engineer who shot them down in the first place."
