= List of Dungeons & Dragons comic books =

In 1981 and 1982, prior to publishing dedicated comic books based on Dungeons & Dragons, TSR created a series of comics as advertisements for the Basic and Expert sets. These ads, written by Stephen D. Sullivan; their illustrators included Jeff Dee and Bill Willingham, were divided into two sets. One ran in various Marvel Comics titles; the other in Epic Illustrated and Heavy Metal.

In 1987, following the successful launch of the Dragonlance campaign setting, TSR began a series of graphic novels adapting the setting's successful novels by Margaret Weis and Tracy Hickman. The company's limited familiarity with comic book distribution led them to negotiate a licensing arrangement with DC Comics. DC produced Dungeons & Dragons comics under this license from 1988 until 1991, when conflicts over licensing led DC to not renew the agreement. A number of advertised comics were cancelled as a result, including an intended series written by James Lowder and set in Ravenloft.

Few licensed comics were produced over the next several years, a period of time that included the acquisition of TSR by Wizards of the Coast. In 2001, an agreement was reached with Kenzer and Company to produce Dungeons & Dragons comics, which lasted until 2004 when the property was licensed to Devil's Due Publishing. Devil's Due lost the license in 2008 amidst financial difficulties the company attributed to book store returns.

From 2010 to 2024, the Dungeons & Dragons comic book license was held by IDW Publications. They have published several new ongoing and limited series along with reprints of earlier series, including some DC and Devil's Due comics. In 2021, HarperCollins Children's Books obtained exclusive rights to publish Dungeons & Dragons middle grade books, which include graphic novels. Dark Horse Comics will acquire the comic book license in 2025.

== 1980s and 1990s ==
Series	Publisher	Dates	Issues	Notes	Ref.
Dragones y Mazmorras [Dungeons and Dragons]	Planeta DeAgostini	1985–1986	27	Spanish-language adaptation of the Dungeons & Dragons animated television series.	
The Dragonlance Saga	TSR / DC Comics	1987–1991	5	First comic book featuring the Dragonlance campaign setting. Written by Roy Thomas, adapting Dragons of Autumn Twilight and Dragons of Winter Night. Published in graphic novel format. The first three volumes were published exclusively by TSR; the last two were in partnership with DC Comics.	
Advanced Dungeons & Dragons	DC Comics	1988–1991	36	First comic book featuring the Forgotten Realms campaign setting. Writers include Michael Fleisher, Jeff Grubb, and Dan Mishkin.	
Dragonlance	DC Comics	1988–1991	34	Most issues written by Dan Mishkin.	
Forgotten Realms	DC Comics	1989–1991	25	Written by Jeff Grubb.	
Spelljammer	DC Comics	1990–1991	15	First comic book featuring the Spelljammer campaign setting. Written by Barbara Kesel.	
Avatar: War of the Gods	DC Comics	1991	3	Written by Barbara Kesel as an adaptation of the first three books of The Avatar Series.	
Dragon Strike	Marvel Comics	1994	1	Written by Jeff Grubb, based on the DragonStrike board game.	
TSR Limited Edition	TSR	1996	4	Given away as promotional products. The four issues are Forgotten Realms: The Grand Tour (by Jeff Grubb), Birthright: The Serpent's Eye (by Ed Stark), Advanced Dungeons & Dragons: Labyrinth of Madness (by Mike Barron), and Dragonlance: The Fifth Age (by Tom and Mary Bierbaum). (Note: A fifth comic, titled Planescape: The Unity of the Rings, was advertised but not distributed. It was released as a digital comic by Wizards of the Coast in 2003.)	
Baldur's Gate	Interplay Entertainment	1998	1	Free promotional comic for the Baldur's Gate video game.	

== 2000s ==
Series	Publisher	Dates	Issues	Notes	Ref.
The Forbidden Sands of Anauroch	21st Century Games	2000	2	Graphic novels released in hardcover. Advertised as a six-issue series, but cancelled by 21st Century after the first two.	
In the Shadow of Dragons	Kenzer & Company	2001–2002	8	First comic book featuring the Greyhawk campaign setting.	
Tempest's Gate	Kenzer & Company	2001–2002	4		
Black & White	Kenzer & Company	2002–2003	6		
Vecna: Hand of the Revenant	Iron Hammer Graphics	2002	1	Graphic novel. Intended as part one of a series that was never produced.	
Where Shadows Fall	Kenzer & Company	2003–2004	5		
Crisis in Raimiton	Wizards of the Coast	2004	1	Produced for Free Comic Book Day in 2004.	
Dragonlance: The Legend of Huma	Devil's Due Publishing	2004–2005	6	Adapted from the novel of the same name. Due in part to licensing complications, the sixth issue was printed as part of a graphic novel compilation before being printed in stand-alone comic book form.	
The Legend of Drizzt	Devil's Due Publishing	2005–2008	22	Adapted from R. A. Salvatore's Dark Elf trilogy, Icewind Dale trilogy, and The Legacy.	
Dragonlance Chronicles	Devil's Due Publishing	2005–2006	24	Adapted from Dragons of Autumn Twilight, Dragons of Winter Night, and Dragons of Spring Dawning.	
Eberron: Eye of the Wolf	Devil's Due Publishing	2006	1	First comic book featuring the Eberron campaign setting. Written by Keith Baker.	
The Worlds of Dungeons & Dragons	Devil's Due Publishing	2008	7	Various writers and settings, including the first comic book featuring the Ravenloft campaign setting, written by James Lowder.	
Dragonlance Legends	Devil's Due Publishing	2008	3	Adapted from Time of the Twins.	

== 2010s ==
Series	Publisher	Dates	Issues	Notes	Ref.
Dungeons & Dragons	IDW Publishing	2010–2012	16	Written by John Rogers and illustrated by Andrea Di Vito, Denis Medri, Horacio Domingues and Juanan.	
Dark Sun: Ianto's Tomb	IDW Publishing	2011	5	Written by Alex Irvine with art by Peter Bergting.	
The Legend of Drizzt: Neverwinter Tales	IDW Publishing	2011	5	Written by R. A. Salvatore.	
Forgotten Realms	IDW Publishing	2012	5	Written by Ed Greenwood, creator of the Forgotten Realms setting, with art by Lee Ferguson and Sal Buscema.	
Forgotten Realms: Cutter	IDW Publishing	2013	5	Written by R. A. Salvatore and Geno Salvatore with art by David Baldeon and Steve Ellis.	
Legends of Baldur's Gate	IDW Publishing	2014–2015	5	Written by Jim Zub with art by Max Dunbar and Sarah Stone. Four sequel limited series have been published.	
Abraxis Wren of Eberron	IDW Publishing	2015	2	Written by Paul Crilley with art by Valerio Schiti, Livio Ramondelli and Menton J. Matthews III (credited as menton3).	
Shadows of the Vampire	IDW Publishing	2016	5	Written by Jim Zub with art by Nelson Daniel and Max Dunbar. Follows Legends of Baldur's Gate.	
Frost Giant's Fury	IDW Publishing	2017	5	Written by Jim Zub with art by Netho Diaz. Follows Shadows of the Vampire.	
Evil at Baldur's Gate	IDW Publishing	2018	5	Written by Jim Zub and Steven Cummings with art by Dean Kotz, John Wycough, Harvey Tolibao, Jim Zub and Francesco Mortarino. Follows Frost Giant's Fury.	
Rick and Morty vs. Dungeons & Dragons	IDW Publishing, Oni Press	2018–2019	4	Co-written by Jim Zub and Patrick Rothfuss with art by Troy Little. Crossover with Rick and Morty.	
A Darkened Wish	IDW Publishing	2019	5	Written by B. Dave Walters with art by Tess Fowler.	
Rick and Morty vs. Dungeons & Dragons II: Painscape	IDW Publishing, Oni Press	2019	4	Written by Jim Zub and Sarah Stern with art by Troy Little. Crossover with Rick and Morty.	
Infernal Tides	IDW Publishing	2019–2020	5	Written by Jim Zub with art by Max Dunbar. Follows Evil at Baldur's Gate.	

== 2020s ==
Series	Publisher	Dates	Issues	Notes	Ref.
Released
Stranger Things and Dungeons & Dragons	IDW Publishing, Dark Horse Comics	2020	5	Co-written by Jim Zub and Jody Houser with art by Diego Galindo, colors by Michele Assarasakorn, and letters by Nate Piekos. Crossover with Stranger Things.	
At the Spine of the World	IDW Publishing	2020–2021	4	Written by AJ Mendez and Aimee Garcia with art by Martin Coccolo and colors by Katrina Mae Hao.	
Mindbreaker	IDW Publishing	2021–2022	5	Written by Jim Zub with art by Eduardo Mello. Follows Infernal Tides and acts as a prelude to the video game Baldur's Gate III.	
Dungeons & Dragons Annual 2022	IDW Publishing	2022	1	Written by Jim Zub & Ryan Cady with art by Eduardo Mello & Kyler Clodfelter.	
Dungeons & Dragons: Dungeon Club: Roll Call: 1	HarperCollins Children's Books	2022	1	Written by Lee Knox Ostertag with art by Xanthe Bouma.	
Dungeons & Dragons: Ravenloft – Orphan of Agony Isle	IDW Publishing	2022	4	Written by Casey Gilly with art by Bayleigh Underwood and Corin Howell	
Dungeons & Dragons: Saturday Morning Adventures	IDW Publishing	2023	4	Written by David M. Booher & Sam Maggs with art by George Kambadais.	
Dungeons and Dragons: Fortune Finder	IDW Publishing	2023–2024	5	Written by Jim Zub, art by Jose Jaro, colors by Adam Guzowski, letters by Amauri Osorio	
Dungeons & Dragons: Saturday Morning Adventures II	IDW Publishing	2024	4	Written by David M. Booher with art by George Kambadais.	
Dungeons & Dragons: The Thief of Many Things	IDW Publishing	2024	1	Written by Ellen Boener with art by Eduardo Mello	
Dungeons & Dragons: Dungeon Club: Time to Party	HarperCollins Children's Books	2024	1	Written by Lee Knox Ostertag with art by Xanthe Bouma.	
Dungeons & Dragons: Dungeon Club: Final Face-off	HarperCollins Children's Books	2025	1	Written by Lee Knox Ostertag with art by Xanthe Bouma.	
Stranger Things and Dungeons & Dragons: The Rise of Hellfire	Dark Horse Comics	2025	4	Written by Jody Houser and Eric Campbell with art by Diego Galindo.	
Dungeons & Dragons: Magefall	Dark Horse Comics	2026	1	Published as part of He-Man and The Masters of the Universe, Dungeons & Dragons on Comics Giveaway Day 2026.	
Ongoing
Dungeons & Dragons: The Fallbacks	Dark Horse Comics	2025–2026	4	Written by Greg Pak, penciled by Wilton Santos, inked by Edvan Alves, colored by Raul Angulo, and lettered by Nate Piekos.	
Dungeons & Dragons: Total Party Killers	Dark Horse Comics	2026	4	Written by Christopher Hastings, illustrated by Denis Medri, colored by Dan Jackson and lettered by Lucas Gattoni.	
Upcoming
Dungeons & Dragons: Ravenloft	Dark Horse Comics	2026	4	Written by Amy Chu, with line art by Ariela Kristantina, colors by Arif Prianto and letters by Haley Rose-Lyon.	
Dungeons & Dragons	Dark Horse Comics	2026	TBA	Written by Jackson Lanzing and Collin Kelly, penciled by Ibraim Roberson, inked by Arabson Oliveira, colors by Dan Brown and letters by Haley Rose-Lyon.	
Baldur's Gate III	Dark Horse Comics	TBA	TBA	TBA	
Brie and the Borrowed Blade	Webtoon	TBA	TBA	Written by Purpah with art by Ryan LeCount; R.A. Salvatore is also involved in the creation of the webtoon. It follows Brie, the daughter of Drizzt and Cattie-Brie.	
