= Mission to Alcazzar =

Role-playing game adventure

Cover art by Larry Elmore, 1984

SF4 Mission to Alcazzar is an adventure published by TSR in 1984 for the science fiction role-playing game Star Frontiers.

== Plot summary ==
The player characters, who have military training, are hired to investigate a company war on the obscure planet Alcazzar, where millions are made in mining. After their investigation, the team must make contact with the indigenous people of Alcazzar. They then find themselves in a pitched battle using armored vehicles — reviewer Stephen Nutt calls it "a veritable Kursk."

== Publication history ==
TSR first published the role-playing game Star Frontiers in 1980, then re-published a revised and expanded edition retitled Alpha Dawn in 1982. Over the next three years, TSR supported the game with a dozen adventures and several accessories. The fifth adventure, Mission to Alcazzar, was published in 1984 as a 32-page softcover book with an outer folder, written by Douglas Niles, with interior art by Jeff Easley, and cover art by Larry Elmore.

== Reception ==
In Issue 32 of Abyss, Dave Nalle noted this was "somewhat better than one would expect ... [It] is not innovative, but it is good solid adventuring with the emphasis on quick thinking rather than personality or interaction, which is not altogether bad for purposes of relaxation."

In Issue 20 of Imagine (November 1984), Stephen Nutt admired the "immaculately presented" production values, and called the artwork of Jeff Easley and Larry Elmore "stunning." He thought the final battle was "the real gem" of the adventure. He concluded with a strong recommendation, saying, "the full scope of the pack is extensive, and many situations can be drawn from the peculiar economic position of Alcazzar. SF4 is a recommended adventure. With a little effort it can be very good value, particularly when one is let loose on the climax."
