= Lords of Waterdeep (video game) =

2013 video game

- Developer: Playdek
- Publisher: Wizards of the Coast
- Platforms: iOS; Android; Windows
- Release: November 21, 2013 (iOS); September 1, 2017 (Android, Windows)
- Genre: Digital board game
- Modes: Single-player; multiplayer

Lords of Waterdeep is a digital board game based on the physical board game of the same name set in the Dungeons & Dragons fictional universe. The iOS version was developed by Playdek and released by Wizards of the Coast on November 21, 2013. Versions for both Android and Steam were released on September 1, 2017. The game was well-received by critics both for its gameplay and mechanics, and noted as one of the best digital board games on mobile platforms.

== Gameplay ==
The game can be played solo or with friends, and puts players in the role of the Masked Lords, the anonymous rulers of Waterdeep, a thriving port city. The goal is to compete against other Lords by scoring the most victory points, earned mostly by completing quests.

== Reception ==
Reception

Review score
Publication	Score
TouchArcade	4/5

The game was positively received by critics.

Shaun Musgrave of TouchArcade gave the iOS version of the game 4/5 stars, calling it a well-designed board game with a good conversion into digital form. He praised both the difficulty of the single-player AI, as well as the ease of local and online multiplayer.

Max Eddy of PCMag gave the iOS version 4.5/5 points and the Editor's Choice award, calling it "fun and strategic" and noting that it both looked and played "great". He praised the tutorials as "in-depth" and noted that no prior knowledge of Dungeons & Dragons was required.

J.P. Grant of Paste called the game's mechanics "intricate" and the game itself one of a number of "outstanding" digital board games. In contrast, Rob Zacny of VICE criticized the game as a "bad teacher".
