= Fox at the Front =

2003 alternate history novel by Douglas Niles and Michael Dobson

- 1st Edition cover
- Author: Michael Dobson and Douglas Niles
- Cover artist: Tony Greco
- Language: English
- Genre: Alternate history, war novel
- Publisher: Tor Books
- Publication date: November 2003 (hardback); June 2004 (paperback)
- Publication place: United States
- Media type: Print
- Pages: 672 pp
- ISBN: 0-7653-4399-1
- OCLC: 52268942
- Preceded by: Fox on the Rhine

Fox at the Front is a 2003 alternate history novel written by Douglas Niles and Michael Dobson. It is a sequel to the 2000 novel Fox on the Rhine.

== Plot summary ==
The story picks up on December 27, 1944, just minutes after the climax to Fox on the Rhine. Field Marshal Erwin Rommel has introduced himself to George Patton and offers to surrender Army Group B to him. Both generals agree that the Soviet Union is a greater threat than all of the German forces under Heinrich Himmler, who has considered him a traitor. Rommel instructs Hasso von Manteuffel's Fifth Panzer Army and Heinz Guderian's Sixth Panzer Army to surrender their units at the first Allied unit they encounter. However, the large concentration of Waffen-SS forces in the Sixth Panzer Army makes Himmler order Jochen Peiper to take over the unit at its headquarters in Namur, which kills Heinz Guderian in the process, and to counterattack the Allies. After a US infantry force, which was sent to accept Guderian's surrender, is ambushed, Peiper marshals a small kampfgruppe from the Leibstandarte Adolf Hitler to attack Rommel's Dinant headquarters, but he is forced to withdraw by heavy US and German resistance. He also collects wounded German forces along the way during the trip back to the Rhine. Patton's liberation of Bastogne and the cooperation of Rommel's forces allows Third Army to race to the Rhine faster than the rest of the Allies by early January 1945. It captures a bridge in Koblenz and tries to cut off as many SS units as they can.

Some SS forces, including Peiper, make it across the Rhine. After he arrives in Berlin, Himmler puts Peiper in charge of the Das Reich division.

Rommel also faces tension on the German side, as he is being eyed to head the government-in-exile of the so-called German Democratic Republic (GDR), but he decides to stay firm and commands the Wehrmacht survivors from Army Group B, now called the German Republican Army (GRA). Having crossed the Rhine, the GRA and the Third Army keep pushing deep into the interior. All the while, Himmler orders Field Marshal Walter Model to reassign all Wehrmacht officers randomly to prevent any conspiracies to defect, especially after US forces co-ordinate with General Kurt Student in overseeing the surrender of Army Group H in Frankfurt.

Meanwhile, on the Eastern Front, the Soviet Union resumes its offensive across Poland, as Stalin assigns the political officer Alexis Krigoff to keep tabs on the attack. The zampolit also reports to the NKVD about generals who are too cautious in their attacks. Das Reich and the Sixth Panzer Army are sent to the Eastwall, a copy of the Westwall, to help to defend the front.

On February 18, a reconnaissance team from the US 19th Armored Division ambushes a train leaving of Ettersburg. Upon derailing the train, the group discovers thousands of corpses and few survivors for whom they provide medical assistance. Rommel is alerted and goes down to Ettersburg to see the situation. He discovers that the train came from the Buchenwald concentration camp and organises an assault under the cover of a snowstorm, with German troops in the lead. The camp is liberated, and the prisoners are taken care of by Allied medical units. Rommel is horrified at the depths to which the Nazi Party reached in Germany's name, and he nearly kills some camp guards in anger. Although he leads the way in the cleanup, the Allied and the GDR leaderships convince Rommel to let the proper medical authorities handle the workload at Buchenwald and to concentrate on capturing Berlin, ahead of the Soviets, who have stumbled upon the Auschwitz camp as well.

On March 13, while the Sixth Panzer Army tries to blunt the Soviet advance, the Allies execute Operation Eclipse, an airborne drop and ground assault on Berlin, where Dietrich surrenders all German forces in the city. A US commando raid also captures Himmler as he tries to escape to Czechoslovakia in a convoy. Enraged at having been beaten to Berlin, Stalin orders Georgy Zhukov to encircle the capital by sending his forces to the Elbe and by cutting off Third Army and the GRA from the rest of the Allied forces, which are still to the west. Zhukov also uses the opportunity to cripple the GRA forces in the northern outskirts heavily while the encirclement continues. The Allied troops in the city are ordered not to attack the Soviets for fear that they will become provoked to unleash their firepower on Berlin. Peiper, who was cut off during the retreat of Das Reich' from Kustrin, is captured and sent to a re-education camp in Siberia.

Over the next few months, the Allies carry out a massive airlift operation into Berlin, which provides reinforcements and supplies while evacuating civilians. The Soviets also use the time to bring more ground forces into the blockade.

The uneasy calm is broken on July 1, when a US transport crashing on the Soviet lines after a major dogfight is interpreted on the ground as an Allied air attack. The Soviets attack all points throughout the blockade, with the main thrust being directed against the 19th Armored Division at Potsdam. However, Zhukov discovers that Krigoff was behind the assumption since he convinced the commander of the 2nd Guards Tank Army to press the attack with the intent of capturing Gatow and Tempelhof airports. The attack bogs down because of Allied airstrikes, but Patton believes that the next Soviet attack will break through the US lines. The determined Soviet assault forces the Manhattan Project to bring the atomic bomb, which was supposed to be used for the Trinity test, to be deployed in Berlin.

On the morning of July 8, General Groves oversees the drop of the Fat Man bomb aboard the Enola Gay with the Soviet artillery and armored concentration in Potsdam as the target. Although there are persistent doubts as to whether the bomb will work, the explosion erases them altogether as it obliterates Potsdam, where Zhukov and Marshal Ivan Konev's headquarters is located. The shock value from the event also forces the other Soviet attacks to stop.

In the aftermath of the bombing, Stalin agrees to withdraw all Red Army forces to the Polish side of the Oder River but leaves behind a small force on the German side to fortify the area. The British spy Kim Philby, who has spent the past few months digging for information on the atomic bomb, is killed by British intelligence as he attempts to alert the Soviets that the Berlin bomb was the only working copy; he was tricked by a fake stockpile several days earlier. Krigoff, who was sent to Lubyanka Prison after the siege, narrates his part of the story to Stalin before he is killed in his cell. The United Nations also convenes a war crimes tribunal to try all Nazis, but Himmler does not make it to the courtroom, as the US soldiers who discovered Buchenwald leave him to die in a camp with Jews and other inmates.

=== Subplots ===
Other subplots in Fox at the Front include the struggle of a B-24 Liberator crewmember who crashed in Fox on the Rhine and his stay in Buchenwald alongside Rommel's personal driver, a teenage Volksgrenadier soldier who is later fielded into the Hitlerjugend and Das Reich divisions, and the exploits of the Fox on the Rhine character Gunther von Reinhardt who negotiates for a peaceful solution with Himmler. Like in the previous novel, the fictional history book War's Final Fury by Professor Jared Gruenwald provides further insights into the novel's events.

== Historical characters ==
=== Germans ===
- Heinrich Himmler – formerly Reichsführer-SS, now Führer
- Erwin Rommel – Wehrmacht field marshal, commander of German Republican Army
- Joachim Peiper – Waffen-SS officer
- Sepp Dietrich – Waffen-SS general
- Hans Speidel – Rommel's chief of staff who is appointed as the German government-in-exile's defense minister
- Heinz Guderian – Wehrmacht general
- Carl Goerdeler – German government-in-exile chancellor

=== Allies ===
- Franklin D. Roosevelt – US president
- Lewis Brereton – commander, First Allied Airborne Army
- Leslie Groves – US general in charge of Manhattan Project
- George Patton – commander, US Third Army
- Courtney Hodges – commander, US First Army
- Dwight D. Eisenhower – Supreme Commander of the Allied forces in Europe
- W. Averell Harriman – US Ambassador to the Soviet Union
- Paul Tibbets – captain of the B-29 Enola Gay (renamed Mickey Mouse Express by Groves)

=== Soviets ===
- Joseph Stalin – dictator
- Georgy Zhukov – marshal and commander 1st Belorussian Front
- Nikolai Bulganin – politician
- Lavrentiy Beria – chief of NKVD
