= Knight Hawks =

Tabletop role-playing game supplement

Knight Hawks is a 1983 role-playing game supplement published by TSR for Star Frontiers.

== Contents ==
Knight Hawks is a supplement which includes rules for spaceships and space combat, with a military boardgame and a Campaign Book rulebook.

Knight Hawks is a board wargame that can be integrated with Star Frontiers to depict tactical battles.

== Reception ==
Mark Pokrzywnicki reviewed Knight Hawks in Space Gamer No. 67. Pokrzywnicki commented that "Knight Hawks is a needed role-playing supplement and a decent space boardgame. It isn't worth the money if you just want the boardgame [...] but if you play Star Frontiers, this set is a good bargain that will expands your game tremendously."

Andy Slack reviewed Knight Hawks for White Dwarf #51, giving it an overall rating of 8 out of 10, and stated that "Overall, this vastly improves the original Star Frontiers [...] and if you bought Star Frontiers I strongly recommend you buy this. As a 12-year old I would have vastly enjoyed this system, and if you know any 12-year olds you want to corrupt into role-playing this is a good system; but serious and aged gamers such as myself will look elsewhere."

Tony Watson reviewed Knight Hawks for Different Worlds magazine and stated that "Knight Hawks is a credit to the TSR design staff and a valuable addition to the Star Frontiers game system. Those players who are involved in a Star Frontiers campaign will certainly wish to expand spaceward with the Knight Hawks material; those gamers who have been reluctant to consider the Star Frontiers system because of the lack of spaceship rules, may wish to give it a second look."

== Reviews ==
- Space Voyager
- Analog Science Fiction and Fact
