= Forgotten Realms =

Dungeons & Dragons fictional campaign setting

- Forgotten Realms logo (2000–present)
- Designers: Ed Greenwood
- Publication: 1987–current
- Genres: Fantasy
- Languages: English
- Media type: Game accessories, novels, role-playing video games, comic books

Forgotten Realms is a campaign setting for the Dungeons & Dragons (D&D) fantasy role-playing game. Commonly referred to by players and game designers as "The Realms", it was created by game designer Ed Greenwood around 1967 as a setting for his childhood stories. Several years later, it was published for the D&D game as a series of magazine articles, and the first Realms game products were released in 1987. Role-playing game products have been produced for the setting ever since, in addition to novels, role-playing video game adaptations (including the first massively multiplayer online role-playing game to use graphics), comic books, the Forgotten Realms play-by-mail game, and the film Dungeons & Dragons: Honor Among Thieves.

Forgotten Realms is a fantasy world setting, described as a world of strange lands, dangerous creatures, and mighty deities, where magic and supernatural phenomena are very real. The premise is that, long ago, planet Earth and the world of the Forgotten Realms were more closely connected. As time passed, the inhabitants of Earth had mostly forgotten about the existence of that other world – hence the name Forgotten Realms. The original Forgotten Realms logo, which was used until 2000, had small runic letters that read "Herein lie the lost lands" as an allusion to the connection between the two worlds.

Forgotten Realms is one of the most popular D&D settings, largely due to the success of novels by authors such as R. A. Salvatore and numerous role-playing video games, including Pool of Radiance (1988), Eye of the Beholder (1991), Icewind Dale (2000), the Neverwinter Nights and the Baldur's Gate series.

== Creative origins ==
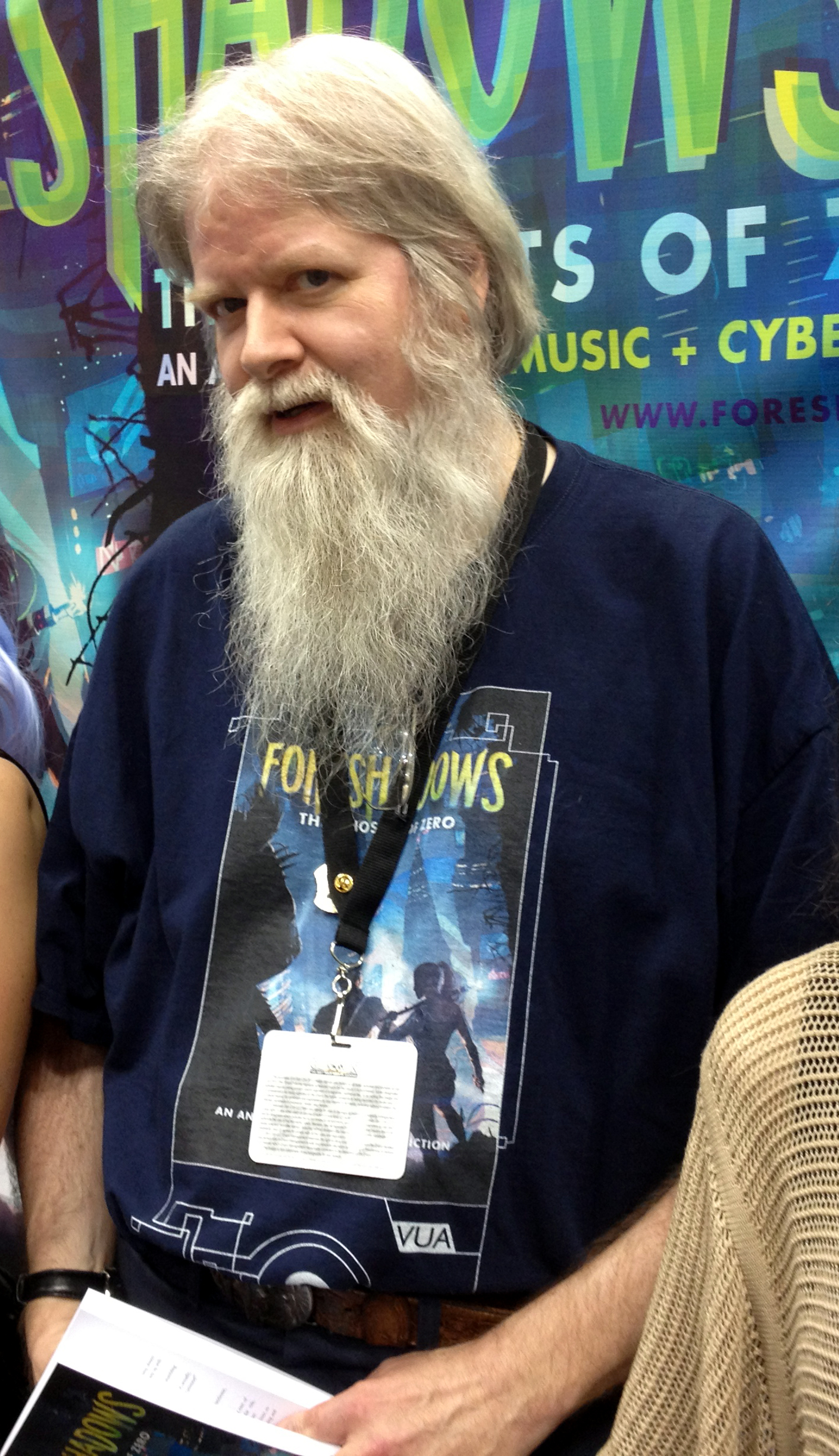
Ed Greenwood in 2012

Ed Greenwood began writing stories about the Forgotten Realms as a child, starting at the age of eight. He came up with the name from the notion of a multiverse of parallel worlds; Earth is one such world, and the Realms another. In Greenwood's original conception, the fantastic legends of Earth derive from a fantasy world that can no longer be accessed. Greenwood discovered the Dungeons & Dragons game in 1975, and became a serious role-playing enthusiast with the first Advanced Dungeons & Dragons (AD&D) game releases in 1978. Greenwood brought his fantasy world into the new medium of role-playing games when a university student named September invited him to play AD&D with her. Greenwood then started using the setting for his personal role-playing campaign. Greenwood began a Realms campaign in the city of Waterdeep before creating a group known as the Knights of Myth Drannor in the Shadowdale region. Greenwood felt that his players' thirst for detail made the Realms what it is: "They want it to seem real, and work on 'honest jobs' and personal activities, until the whole thing grows into far more than a casual campaign. Roleplaying always governs over rules, and the adventures seem to develop themselves." Greenwood has stated that his own version of the Forgotten Realms, as run in his personal campaign, is much darker than published versions.

Starting in 1979, Greenwood published a series of articles that detailed the setting in The Dragon (later Dragon) magazine, the first of which was about a monster known as the curst. Greenwood continued to write extensive articles for Dragon, in which he used the Forgotten Realms as the setting to detail magic items, monsters, and spells. In August, 1982, Greenwood published the first adventure set in the Forgotten Realms, titled The Assassin's Run, for Dragon issue 64. When Gary Gygax "lost control of TSR in 1985, the company saw an opportunity to move beyond Greyhawk and introduce a new default setting". In 1986, TSR began looking for a new campaign setting for AD&D, and assigned Jeff Grubb to find out more about the setting used by Greenwood as portrayed in his articles in Dragon.

Greenwood states that Grubb asked him "Do you just make this stuff up as you go, or do you really have a huge campaign world?", and Greenwood answered "yes" to both questions. TSR felt that the Forgotten Realms would be a more open-ended setting than its epic fantasy counterpart Dragonlance, and chose the Realms as a ready-made campaign setting upon deciding to publish AD&D 2nd edition. Greenwood agreed to work on the project and began working to get Forgotten Realms officially published. He sent TSR a few dozen cardboard boxes stuffed with pencil notes and maps, and sold all rights to the setting for a token fee. He noted that TSR altered his original conception of the Realms being a place that could be accessed from Earth, as "[c]oncerns over possible lawsuits (kids getting hurt while trying to 'find a gate') led TSR to de-emphasize this meaning".

Jon Peterson, author of Dungeons and Dragons Art and Arcana: A Visual History, said that Greenwood "was that rare obsessive DM who just seemed to have more ideas and energy to pour into his world than even the folks at TSR did. Naturally when TSR was shopping for new campaign worlds as part of their cross-media strategy, they had to get the Forgotten Realms. R. A. Salvatore took Greenwood's world and created characters and stories for it that made him a bestselling author and sustained TSR as a major fantasy book publisher".

== Publication history ==
=== 1985–1990 ===
In 1985, the AD&D module Bloodstone Pass was released by TSR and is retroactively considered to be a part of the Forgotten Realms, although it was not until the module The Bloodstone Wars was released that it became the official setting for the module series. Douglas Niles had worked on a novel trilogy with a Celtic theme, which were then altered to become the first novels set in the Forgotten Realms, starting with Darkwalker on Moonshae (1987). It is the first book in The Moonshae Trilogy, which predates the Forgotten Realms Campaign Set by one month.

The Forgotten Realms Campaign Set was later released in 1987 as a boxed set of two source books (Cyclopedia of the Realms and DM's Sourcebook of the Realms) and four large color maps, designed by Greenwood in collaboration with Grubb. It sold approximatly one hundred fifty thousand copies in its first two years. The set introduced the campaign setting and explained how to use it, and reserved space on the map for SSI's Gold Box computer role-playing games set in the Forgotten Realms.

TSR began incorporating elements by other designers into the Forgotten Realms, including the Moonshae Isles by Douglas Niles, the "Desert of Desolation" by Tracy Hickman and Laura Hickman, and Kara-Tur by Zeb Cook. The setting also provided a new way for TSR to market its Battlesystem rules, which it had supported with the Bloodstone adventure sequence which started with Bloodstone Pass; the last two adventures in the series, The Bloodstone Wars (1987) and The Throne of Bloodstone (1988), were unambiguously set in the Forgotten Realms. Some characters from Egg of the Phoenix (1987) by Frank Mentzer were incorporated into The Savage Frontier (1988).

The compilation module Desert of Desolation reworked the previous adventures to fit as part of the Forgotten Realms. The module Under Illefarn, published in 1987, is set in the Forgotten Realms, as is the module released in 1988, Swords of the Iron Legion.

R. A. Salvatore wrote his first novel for the Forgotten Realms, The Crystal Shard (1988), which was originally set in the Moonshae Islands before being moved to a new location and introduced the drow character Drizzt Do'Urden. Drizzt has since appeared in more than seventeen subsequent novels, many of which have appeared on the New York Times Best Seller list. In 1988, the first in a line of Forgotten Realms role-playing video games, Pool of Radiance, was released by Strategic Simulations, Inc. The game was popular and won the Origins Award for "Best Fantasy or Science Fiction Computer Game of 1988".

Several supplements to the original boxed set were released under the first edition rules, beginning with Waterdeep and the North, which was followed by Moonshae in 1987, and Empires of the Sands, The Magister, The Savage Frontier, Dreams of the Red Wizards, and Lords of Darkness in 1988. The City System boxed set was released in 1988, and it contained several maps of the city of Waterdeep. Ruins of Adventure, a module based on the computer game Pool of Radiance, was also released in 1988.

The boxed set Kara-Tur: The Eastern Realms was released in 1988. It gives details of the lands of Kara-Tur, and was designed to be used with the 1986 book Oriental Adventures, which officially placed the book in the Forgotten Realms world.

In 1989, DC Comics began publishing a series of Forgotten Realms comics written by Grubb. Each issue contains twenty-six pages, illustrated primarily by Rags Morales and Dave Simons. Twenty-five issues were published in total, with the last being released in 1991. A fifty-six page annual Forgotten Realms Comic Annual #1: Waterdhavian Nights, illustrated by various artists, was released in 1990.

Curse of the Azure Bonds, a module based on the role-playing video game of the same name, was released in 1989.

=== 1990–2000 ===
Forgotten Realms video games
1988	Pool of Radiance
1989	Hillsfar
1989	Curse of the Azure Bonds
1990	Secret of the Silver Blades
1990	Eye of the Beholder
1991	Eye of the Beholder II: The Legend of Darkmoon
1991	Pools of Darkness
1991	Neverwinter Nights
1991	Gateway to the Savage Frontier
1992	Treasures of the Savage Frontier
1993	Forgotten Realms: Unlimited Adventures
1993	Dungeon Hack
1993	Eye of the Beholder III: Assault on Myth Drannor
1994	Menzoberranzan
1995
1996	Blood & Magic
1997	Descent to Undermountain
1998	Baldur's Gate
1999
2000	Baldur's Gate II: Shadows of Amn
2000	Icewind Dale
2001	Baldur's Gate: Dark Alliance
2001	Pool of Radiance: Ruins of Myth Drannor
2002	Icewind Dale II
2002	Neverwinter Nights
2002	Dungeons & Dragons: Eye of the Beholder
2003
2004	Baldur's Gate: Dark Alliance II
2005	Forgotten Realms: Demon Stone
2006	Neverwinter Nights 2
2007
2008
2009
2010
2011	Dungeons & Dragons: Daggerdale
2011	Heroes of Neverwinter
2012
2013	Neverwinter
2014	Lords of Waterdeep
2015	Sword Coast Legends
2016
2017	Tales from Candlekeep: Tomb of Annihilation
2018	Idle Champions of the Forgotten Realms
2019	Warriors of Waterdeep
2020
2021	Dungeons & Dragons: Dark Alliance
2022
2023	Baldur's Gate III

To transition the Forgotten Realms from first edition AD&D to the ruleset's second edition, a story involving the gods being cast down was planned by TSR management from the top-down and started with Hall of Heroes (1989) and continued with a three-adventure Avatar series (1989) and a three-novel Avatar series (1989), and some stories in the comic book. TSR adjusted the timeline of the Forgotten Realms by advancing the calendar one year forward to 1358 DR, referring to the gap as the Time of Troubles.

In early 1990, the hardcover Forgotten Realms Adventures by Grubb and Greenwood was released, which introduced the setting to AD&D 2nd edition; the book also detailed how the Time of Troubles had changed the setting. The Ruins of Undermountain (1991) was one of the first published mega-dungeons. The Al-Qadim setting by Jeff Grubb was released in 1992, and the setting was added to the southern part of the Forgotten Realms. In July 1990, the RPGA Network's Polyhedron Newszine began publishing a monthly column by Greenwood entitled "The Everwinking Eye" detailing various locations and personalities in the Realms. The Network used the Forgotten Realms city of Ravens Bluff as the setting for their first living campaign. Official RPGA support for this product line included the Living City module series. A number of sub-settings of the Forgotten Realms were briefly supported in the early 1990s. Three more modules were produced for the Kara-Tur setting. The Horde boxed set, released in 1990, detailed the Hordelands, which featured a series of three modules. The Maztica Campaign Set, released in 1991, detailed the continent of Maztica.

The original gray boxed set was revised in 1993 to update it to AD&D 2nd edition, with the release of a new Forgotten Realms Campaign Setting boxed set containing three books (A Grand Tour of the Realms, Running the Realms, and Shadowdale) and various "monster supplements". Additional material for the setting was released steadily throughout the 1990s. Forgotten Realms novels, such as the Legacy of the Drow series, the first three books of The Elminster Series, and numerous anthologies were also released throughout the 1990s, which led to the setting being hailed as one of the most successful shared fantasy universes of the 1990s. By the first quarter of 1996, TSR had published sixty-four novels set in the Forgotten Realms out of the 242 novels set in AD&D worlds. These novels in turn sparked interest in role-playing by new gamers.

Numerous Forgotten Realms video games were released between 1990 and 2000. Eye of the Beholder for MS-DOS was released in 1990, which was followed by two sequels: the first in 1991, and the second in 1992. All three games were re-released for MS-DOS compatible operating systems on a single disk in 1995. Another 1991 release was Neverwinter Nights on America Online, the first graphical massively multiplayer online role-playing game (MMORPG). In 1998, Baldur's Gate, the first in a line of popular role-playing video games developed by BioWare and "considered by most pundits as the hands-down best PC roleplaying game ever", was released. The game was followed by a sequel, Baldur's Gate II: Shadows of Amn, in 2000 and Icewind Dale, a separate game that utilized the same game engine as Baldur's Gate. Pool of Radiance: Ruins of Myth Drannor was released in 2001. Several popular Forgotten Realms characters such as Drizzt Do'Urden and Elminster made minor appearances in these games.

=== 2000–2008 ===
When Wizards of the Coast took over publication of Dungeons & Dragons after purchasing TSR in 1997, they trimmed production down from six campaign settings to Forgotten Realms and Dragonlance, and completed AD&D 2nd edition production sometime between 1998 and 1999. They later hired Rob Heinsoo to be part of the D&D Worlds team and focus on Forgotten Realms in the third edition of Dungeons & Dragons. An official material update and a timeline advance were introduced to the Dungeons & Dragons 3rd edition in 2001 with the release of the hardcover book the Forgotten Realms Campaign Setting, which won the Origins Award for Best Role-Playing Game Supplement of 2001 in 2002. The timeline was officially advanced from 1358 DR to 1372 DR. The adventure City of the Spider Queen (2002) did not meet its projected sales targets, so Wizards of the Coast cut back on production of new adventures.

In 2002, BioWare released Neverwinter Nights, set in the northern reaches of Faerûn and operating on the revised 3.0 rules for D&D. It was followed by two expansion packs: Shadows of Undrentide and Hordes of the Underdark. A sequel using version 3.5 of the rules was produced by Obsidian Entertainment in 2006, and was followed by the expansion sets Mask of the Betrayer and Storm of Zehir. The Forgotten Realms Deluxe Edition compilation was released in 2006, containing the Baldur's Gate series (excluding the Dark Alliance games), Icewind Dale series, and all Neverwinter Nights games before Neverwinter Nights 2.

=== 2008–2014 ===
With the release of Dungeons & Dragons 4th edition in 2008, Wizards opted for a publishing plan featuring a series of six books per year – consisting of three core rulebooks as well as three setting books – beginning with the Forgotten Realms. The company started the cycle with the Forgotten Realms Campaign Guide (2008), the Forgotten Realms Player's Guide (2008), and Scepter Tower of Spellgard. These books updated the Forgotten Realms to the newest rules system which altered the setting drastically to make it fit with the 4th edition concept of "Points of Light".

The main lore change centered around an event called the Spellplague in 1385 DR. This cataclysm was unleashed when the goddess of magic Mystra was killed, "transforming whole nations and altering creatures. In addition, parts of Toril have fused with its long-lost twin world Abeir, whisking away some countries and adding new ones. The Underdark is more open to the surface. Thay has become a nightmare land of death and the Elves, sensing the newfound connection to the Feywild, have returned to Faerûn in force". The event moved the fictional world's timeline 94 years into the future to 1479 DR. The Spellplague acted as "a narrative justification for design changes".

In 2008, the Forgotten Realms also became the setting for the RPGA's sole living campaign, Living Forgotten Realms, replacing Living Greyhawk.

In 2011, the Neverwinter Campaign Setting was released which launched the 4th edition's first major multimedia release. The Forgotten Realms city setting spawned four novels by R. A. Salvatore called the Neverwinter Saga, a comic book, and a board game called The Legend of Drizzt, as well as two video games – the Facebook game Heroes of Neverwinter (2011–2012) and a MMORPG called Neverwinter (2013). Laura Tommervik, from the Wizards of the Coast marketing team, explained the approach: "We use Neverwinter as the connective tissue across multiple product categories. The transmedia campaign is an opportunity for fans to experience the brand however they choose to".

In 2013, Wizards of the Coast announced a year-long event called the Sundering which acted as a multimedia project to transition the Forgotten Realms to the next edition of the game. This release included a weekly D&D Encounters in-store play event, a free-to-play mobile game Arena of War (2013), a social networking app called the Sundering Adventurer's Chronicles, and a collaborative novel series: The Companions (2013) by R. A. Salvatore, The Godborn (2013) by Paul S. Kemp, The Adversary (2013) by Erin Evans, The Reaver (2014) by Richard Lee Byers, The Sentinel (2014) by Troy Denning, and The Herald (2014) by Ed Greenwood. Liz Schuh, Head of Publishing and Licensing for Dungeons & Dragons, said:

The Sundering is the last of a series of ground-shaking events. It really affects the whole world of the Forgotten Realms in a major way. You may remember when the Spell Plagues began, the two worlds of the Forgotten Realms, Abeir and Toril, crashed together. That created both geographic changes (the map of the Forgotten Realms and Faerûn actually changed due to that collision), and also changed the way magic works. It changed the pantheon of the gods. The Sundering is all about those two worlds separating—coming apart—and the process of that separation is really the story that we're telling over the next year. At the end of this story arc, Abeir and Toril will be separate again, and many of the things that happened when they crashed together will go back to the way they were before. So magic will be much like it was before the Spell Plague. Markings that marked spell-plagued people and animals will fade and go away. It's really about moving the Forgotten Realms forward, but also about bringing it around to the most beloved and most fondly remembered Forgotten Realms.

The result of The Second Sundering, in game terms, was the transition from 4th edition rules to 5th edition rules of Dungeons & Dragons, published in 2014.

=== 2014–2024 ===
When D&D 5th edition was published in 2014, Wizards of the Coast announced that the Forgotten Realms would continue to serve as the official campaign setting for its upcoming published adventure materials. The village of Phandalin in the Forgotten Realms acted as the primary setting for the new 5th edition Starter Set (2014) which was published before the release of three new core rulebooks. "Tyranny of Dragons" was the first multimedia storyline for the new edition and included two adventure modules, Hoard of the Dragon Queen (2014) and The Rise of Tiamat (2014), and an update to the Neverwinter (2013) video game. The next two storylines, "Elemental Evil" which included Princes of the Apocalypse (2015) and "Rage of Demons" which included Out of the Abyss (2015), were also set in the Forgotten Realms.

The first campaign guide for the new edition, the Sword Coast Adventurer's Guide (2015), was released on November 3, 2015, and only covered a fraction of the Forgotten Realms. It describes the 2013 Sundering event, referred to as the Second Sundering in the book, and its consequences in game terms and lore. The video game Sword Coast Legends (2015) published by Digital Extremes was also released in the same month as the tabletop campaign guide. The adventure module Storm King's Thunder (2016) "sprawls over the northern Forgotten Realms–from Waterdeep to Icewind Dale". 5th edition details on "the rest of Faerûn had been untouched until the Tomb of Annihilation (2017), an adventure that leaves the northern Sword Coast for the southern jungles of Chult". The official Dungeons & Dragons actual play web series Rivals of Waterdeep, which premiered in 2018, is set in the Forgotten Realms. It adapted adventure modules such as Waterdeep: Dragon Heist (2018), Baldur's Gate: Descent Into Avernus (2019) and Candlekeep Mysteries (2021) which are also set in the Forgotten Realms.

In 2023, the Forgotten Realms role-playing video game Baldur's Gate 3 (2023) was released by Larian Studios. It had record-breaking awards success such as becoming the first game to win Game of the Year, or the equivalent category, at all five major ceremonies: the Golden Joystick Awards, the Game Developers Choice Awards, the DICE Awards, the BAFTAs, and The Game Awards. Also released in 2023 was the film Dungeons & Dragons: Honor Among Thieves which is set in the Forgotten Realms and features Neverwinter as a major location.

=== 2024–present ===
Dungeons & Dragons: The Twenty-Sided Tavern is a stage production which combines actual play, improv, and immersive theater as the player cast navigate a Dungeons & Dragons adventure set in the Forgotten Realms. It officially opened on off-Broadway on May 5, 2024, at Stage 42 in New York City; it closed on May 11, 2025. In December 2024, it opened at the Sydney Opera House's Studio venue in Sydney; it closed on April 6, 2025. The U.S. national tour began in July 2025.

Wizards of the Coast released the 2024 revision to the 5th Edition ruleset which updates preexisting player options while introducing new content to the game. This included releasing new backward compatible versions of the core rulebooks. Two Forgotten Realms focused sourcebooks – Heroes of Faerûn (2025) and Adventures in Faerûn (2025) – were scheduled released in November 2025. Following the announcement of these sourcebooks, Game Rant noted that "outside the brief documentation for many areas in the Storm King's Thunder adventure, the only real sourcebook the [Forgotten Realms] setting saw [in 5th Edition] was the Sword Coast Adventurer's Guide". Heroes of Faerûn (2025) is aimed at players and "will include new subclasses, feats, backgrounds, items, along with new rules for Circle magic, a gazeteer-style guide to the Realms, a guide to the gods of the Realms, and more information about the factions that rule Faerûn". Adventures in Faerûn (2025) is aimed at dungeon masters and will include adventures, monsters and villains along with details on "five different settings: Baldur's Gate, Calimshan, the Dalelands, the Moonshae Isles, and Icewind Dale". Additionally, three corresponding digital expansions will be released exclusively on D&D Beyond in November 2025 – Astarion's Book of Hungers (2025) with vampire themed player options and adventures, Netheril's Fall (2025) which features a time-traveling adventure, and an untitled third book.

== Fictional setting ==
The focus of the Forgotten Realms setting is the continent of Faerûn, the western part of a continent that was roughly modeled after the Eurasian continent on Earth. The lands of the Forgotten Realms are not all ruled by the human race, with populations of many humanoid races and creatures ubiquitous in fantasy fiction works such as dwarves, elves, goblins, and orcs. Technologically, the world of the Forgotten Realms resembles the pre-industrial Earth in the 13th or 14th century. However, the presence of magic provides an additional element of power to the societies. There are several nation states and many independent cities, with loose alliances being formed for defense or conquest. Trade is performed by ship or horse-drawn vehicle, and manufacturing is based upon cottage industry.

=== Geography ===
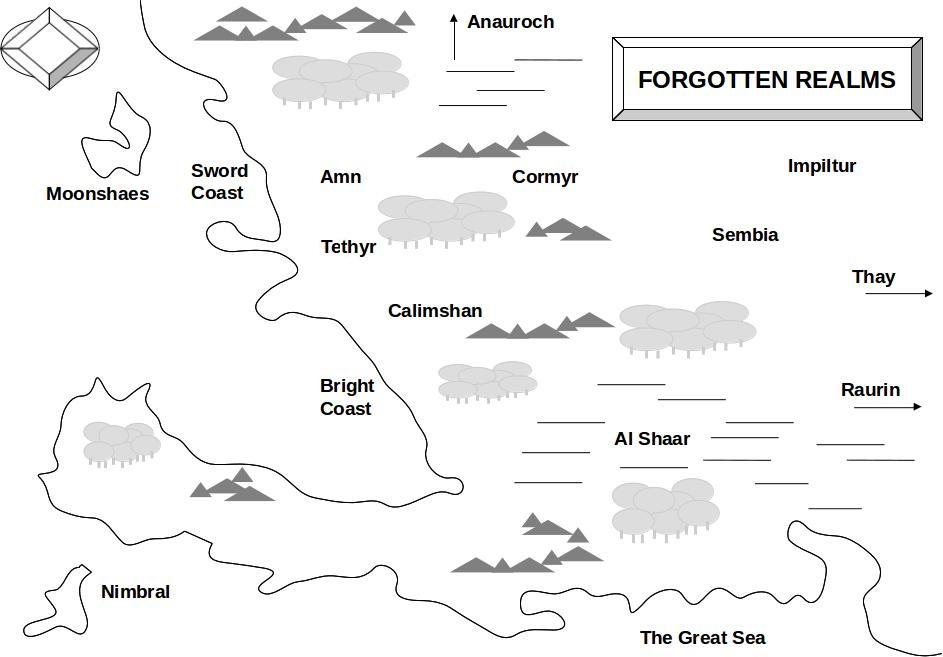
Forgotten Realms partial map

The Forgotten Realms is part of the fictional world of Abeir-Toril (usually just called Toril), an Earth-like planet with many real-world influences and consists of several large continents. It was first detailed in the original Forgotten Realms Campaign Set, published in 1987 by TSR. The other continents of Toril include Kara-Tur, Zakhara, Maztica, and other yet unspecified landmasses. Kara-Tur, roughly corresponding to ancient East Asia, was later the focus of its own source book Kara-Tur: The Eastern Realms, published in 1988. There is also a vast subterranean world called the Underdark beneath the surface.

In early editions of the setting, The Realms shared a unified cosmology with various other campaign settings called the Great Wheel. In this way each of the Dungeons & Dragons campaign settings were linked together to form one interwoven world connected by various planes of existence. With the release of the 2001 Forgotten Realms Campaign Setting, the setting was given its own distinct and separate cosmological arrangement, with unique planes not explicitly connected to those of the other settings.

=== Religion ===
Religion plays a large part in the Forgotten Realms, with deities and their followers being an integral part of the world. Deities interact directly in mortal affairs, answer prayers, and have their own personal agendas. All deities must have worshippers to survive, and all mortals must worship a patron deity to secure a good afterlife. A huge number of diverse deities exist within several polytheistic pantheons; a large number of supplements have documented many of them, some in more detail than others. Greenwood created a pantheon of gods for his home Dungeons & Dragons game, in his Forgotten Realms world, which were introduced in his article "Down-to-earth divinity" from Dragon #54 (October 1981).

When the Forgotten Realms was published as a setting in 1987, the pantheon added Waukeen, the goddess of trade, money, and wealth, who was created by one of Jeff Grubb's players, and added to the Forgotten Realms by Grubb. Tyche was replaced with Tymora, and the elemental lords from Melniboné were replaced by Akadi, Grumbar, Istishia, and Kossuth.

Much of the history of the Forgotten Realms detailed in novels and source books concerns the actions of various deities and The Chosen (mortal representatives with a portion of their deities' power) such as Elminster, Fzoul Chembryl, Midnight (who later became the new embodiment of the goddess of magic, Mystra), and the Seven Sisters. Above all other deities is Ao, the Overlord, who does not sanction worshipers and distances himself from mortals. He is single-handedly responsible for the Time of Troubles, or Godswar, as seen in The Avatar Trilogy.

=== Characters ===
The setting is home to several noteworthy recurring characters that have gained wider reception, including:

- The Companions of the Hall, a group of adventurers that were created by R. A. Salvatore and introduced in The Crystal Shard (1988). Each of these characters "fit into an RPG archetype". They include:
  - Drizzt Do'Urden, a drow, or dark elf, ranger who is the main character of 34 novels. Drizzt is noted for his commitment to friendship and peace, which is contrary to the stereotype of his people. Drizzt as a character is often used to represent issues of racial prejudice, particularly in The Dark Elf Trilogy. Drizzt is also troubled by the lifespan discrepancy between himself and his human romantic interest Catti-Brie.
  - Wulfgar, a massive human barbarian; in The Crystal Shard, Wulfgar's combat prowess is significant enough that along with Drizzt and his magic panther Guenhwyvar, they manage to "beat 25 giants by themselves". As a character, Wulfgar exemplifies "the strong, honest, hot-headed young warrior hero type common to adventure stories and similar to Howard's creation Conan".
  - Bruenor Battlehammer, a dwarven fighter who retakes Mithral Hall with the help of the other Companions and becomes its king. He was one of the first friends Drizzt made upon leaving the Underdark and both Catti-Brie and Wulfgar are his adopted children. Rob Bricken for io9 highlighted Bruenor as "a dwarf that hits pretty much every fantasy stereotype, including his desire to reclaim an ancestral home that his people were chased out of after they dug too far and awakened a monster".
  - Catti-brie, a human archer who would later develop abilities as a spellcaster; in The Crystal Shard, Drizzt referred to her as his soulmate. Catti-Brie is favored by Mielikki, a goddess associated with forests and nature spirits, and she bears the deity's mark. Bricken argued that her characterization in The Icewind Dale Trilogy is limited, while Aidan-Paul Canavan maintained that she becomes a "hero" only in later novels.
  - Regis, a halfling member of the Companions, who behaves in the stereotypical manner of J.R.R. Tolkien's hobbits. Bricken noted that Regis is a rogue who "set himself apart a bit by carrying a crystal pendant he can use to charm people", though he is sometimes forced into dangerous situations and "ends up saving the day, Bilbo-style", such as in the final battle of The Crystal Shard.
- Elminster, a wizard also known as the Sage of Shadowdale; he is "a founding member of the Harpers and one of the oldest surviving and most powerful Chosen of Mystra". The Harpers are a semi-secret organization; Jonathan Palmer, for Arcane magazine, called them "Laudable" and commented that they are "fighters for freedom and justice". Bricken described Elminster as "the most powerful, important, and smartest wizard in the Forgotten Realms, and one of the setting's most important characters [...] more Merlin than Gandalf, which makes him less enigmatic and prone to tomfoolery than other major fantasy wizards, which I count as a good thing".
- Volothamp Geddarm, a human adventurer who is famed within the setting Faerûn for the number of guidebooks he writes about the various regions within the Realms. The character's name is often attributed in real-world D&D publications as the in-universe narrator of said works. Paul Pettengale from Arcane described him as "one of those characters that everyone's heard about, and one that just about every Dungeon Master must have been tempted to introduce to their campaign at some point or another".
- Khelben "Blackstaff" Arunsun, developed by Greenwood and game designer Steven Schend, is a character noted for his appearances in several novels set in the Forgotten Realms, as well as the 2004 video game Forgotten Realms: Demon Stone. A powerful wizard renowned for his namesake staff, in earlier editions he is the Archmage of Waterdeep, leading member of the Harpers, and one of Mystra's Chosen. Prior to his death, Khelben passes the Blackstaff to his apprentice Tsarra, who takes up residence at Blackstaff Tower in Waterdeep and inherits his memories and legacy. Writer Aubrey Sherman said he is an example for the importance of a wand or staff behind the conception of a wizard archetype and listed the character among D&D's notable wizards.
- Jarlaxle, also a character by R. A. Salvatore, was introduced in the 1990 novel Exile. He also appears in Promise of the Witch King, Road of the Patriarch and The Pirate King, as well as The Sellswords and the Paths of Darkness trilogies. Described by Christian Hoffer from Comicbook.com as a popular and intriguing supporting character, Jarlaxle is the charismatic and opportunistic drow leader of the mercenary band Bregan D'aerthe. Anglistics scholar Caroline de Launay characterized Jarlaxle as an independent character inclined to "subtle manoeuvres", while Hoffer explained that he is an amoral villain who has "plenty of contingencies and secret plots". When comparing the plot of The Dark Elf Trilogy to a game of chess, de Launay assigned Jarlaxle the role of the knight. Theo Kogod, for CBR, wrote that Jarlaxle is "in many ways [...] a dark reflection of the heroic and honorable Drizzt. He used lies, manipulation and cunning to rise as high as a male Drow could within his culture, but in the end, he also left his home behind. [...] In Waterdeep: Dragon Heist, Jarlaxle is trying to leverage himself to become accepted as a legitimate member of the Lords' Alliance. He is one of four possible main villains in the campaign".
- Artemis Entreri, a human assassin described by Bricken as "cold-blooded" and Drizzt's "equal in fighting and opposite in morality", a mirror image of how Drizzt would have ended up if he had remained part of the universally evil drow society instead of forsaking it.
- Gromph Baenre is Archmage of the city of Menzoberranzan, the City of Spiders. Gromph is a rival in power to the other archmages of the Forgotten Realms, such as Elminster and Khelben "Blackstaff" Arunsun. In a review of the 1995 novel Daughter of the Drow, Gideon Kibblewhite for Arcane, called Gromph the "only interesting character" in the book, describing him as "the bitter and twisted archmage", and lamented that "he rarely makes an appearance after the opening".
- Liriel Baenre is the daughter of Gromph Baenre; she originally belonged to House Vandree before her talent for arcane spellcasting was discovered by Gromph. After being sent away to hone her magical talent rather than study as a priestess, Liriel uses a book given by her father to travel to the surface lands, where she encounters followers of the goddess Eilistraee, the Dark Maiden of benevolent drow, comes to possess the magical artifact known as the Windwalker, and eventually settle down on the surface world permanently. Liriel was created by Elaine Cunningham for Daughter of the Drow, and is described by Trenton Webb of Arcane as "the oddest Drow" due to her lack of traits deemed as stereotypical of her people.
- Erevis Cale, first introduced in the short story "Another Name For Dawn" published in issue 277 of Dragon magazine, is a pivotal character in novels by Paul S. Kemp, including The Halls of Stormweather, Shadows Witness, the Erevis Cale Trilogy, and The Twilight War trilogy. Originally a normal human, he accepts the gift of the Fane of Shadows in Twilight Falling and becomes a shade; being imbued with the essence of matter integral to the Plane of Shadow brings about drastic changes to his appearance and physiology. Don D'Ammassa described Erevis Cale as "a man tormented by questions of right and wrong".
- Alustriel Silverhand is the ruler of the city of Silverymoon in "The North" of the setting. Writing in 2000, Envoyer magazine reviewer Stylo counted her among the most prominent Forgotten Realms characters thanks to R.A. Salvatore's novels.
- Szass Tam is a lich and leader of the Red Wizards of Thay.

== Reception ==
In his book The Fantasy Roleplaying Gamer's Bible, Sean Patrick Fannon describes the Forgotten Realms as being "the most ambitious fantasy game setting published since Tekumel", and that it "may be the most widely played-in game setting in RPG history". Similarly, in literature, the novels written in the Forgotten Realms setting have formed one of "the industry's leading fantasy series". Over time these novels have gained "unprecedented popularity", which led, as Marc Oxoby noted in his book, The 1990s, to the novels having an "extraordinary shelf life", remaining in print for many years. This popular reception has also been reflected in public libraries; for example, Joyce Saricks states in The Readers' Advisory Guide to Genre Fiction that the novels have been among the most requested books by fans of the fantasy genre. D&D chroniclers Michael Witwer et al., in the book Dungeons & Dragons Art & Arcana, noted that the "level of Tolkienesque history and detail that Greenwood had infused in his creation - and almost "real world" quality - granted the Realms an irresistible allure [...]. While at its core the Forgotten Realms is a familiar, almost traditional, medieval-styled fantasy setting, it boasted unprecedented scope". "It is, quite simply, Dungeons & Dragons at its very core."

Aubrey Sitterson, for PC Magazine, included the Forgotten Realms in a 2015 roundup of the "11 Best Dungeons & Dragons Campaign Settings" and wrote that "for most people, Forgotten Realms is synonymous with Dungeons & Dragons, and with good reason: it's the setting that played home to the massively popular Baldur's Gate video game, as well as R. A. Salvatore's Drizzt books. Currently, it's the only campaign setting actively supported by D&D makers Wizards of the Coast, which would be restrictive if Forgotten Realms wasn't such an incredibly diverse place, housing classic European middle ages tropes, as well as a heroic fantasy take on African, Middle Eastern, and other real-world cultures". Brian Silliman, for SYFY Wire in 2017, described the Forgotten Realms as "a classic fantasy backdrop" and highlighted that "at one time in our history, our world and this one were connected, but over time this magical realm was, well, forgotten. It is an ideal place for any D&D adventure, inspiring limitless possibilities for any smirking dungeon master". In 2019, academic Philip J. Clements called the "highly popular" Forgotten Realms "an unusually well-developed D&D setting" and "more-or-less the flagship setting for D&D". He also noted that it has received the greatest number of supplements.

In a retrospective on the legacy of Dungeons & Dragons, academic Daniel Heath Justice commented that the "Forgotten Realms was explicitly based on the civilized-versus-savage binary and leaned in hard on racial essentialism in its sadistic black-skinned drow led by vicious matriarchs and their terrible spider goddess, firmly melding anti-Blackness with misogyny, a once-civilized people gone feral under the debased rule of women".

=== Edition updates ===
The 4th edition update to the Forgotten Realms brought massive lore changes which were "tied to a number of other design philosophies" and the Forgotten Realms "simultaneously had become a grittier setting, on the edge of collapse, while also becoming a more fantastic one, full of wonder and mystery". Jason Wilson, for VentureBeat, highlighted that unlike the Time of Troubles cataclysm, the 4th edition Spellplague cataclysm was "one players never embraced in the same manner as the earlier disaster". Shannon Appelcline, author of Designers & Dragons, wrote:

[The 4th edition] Forgotten Realms Campaign Guide may be the most controversial D&D book ever produced by Wizards. That's entirely due to the large-scale destruction of the Realms. Similar updates have been tried by other companies — to reinvigorate settings, to make them more accessible to new players, or to make them more adventuresome. [...] It never seems to go well, because old fans feel left behind. With that said, some folks did love the changes, because the setting was now more playable, more accessible, more fantastic, and more PC centered. [...] Meanwhile, a series of adventures and novels called The Sundering (2013–2014) reversed many of the 4e changes to the Realms, but without rebooting the timeline. Instead, the Realms continues to evolve and advance, as it has since its earlier days.

R. A. Salvatore was also publicly unhappy with the 4th edition changes to the Forgotten Realms:

[B]asically, we authors were handed a document and told how things were going to be. We were asked our opinions, but they mattered very little – the changes were being driven from a different direction. [...] To have characters that have built such a strong history, then have that upset on the orders of someone else was very disconcerting. I will admit that the abrupt changes forced me into an uncomfortable place, and from that place came some of the better things I've written, but I very much preferred the way it was done this time, with 5th Edition and the changes, where we, the authors, were told what was happening to the game and asked how we could make the world and the lore live and breathe it.

Christian Hoffer, for ComicBook.com, reported that Wizards of the Coast's 5th edition publishing strategy, which focuses on the Forgotten Realms and newer intellectual property for campaign settings, has created a rift in the fan base where some "feel that this push for new players has come at the cost of keeping the game's current players sated" by not updating campaign settings that "predate the Forgotten Realms". Hoffer highlighted that Wizards of the Coast has a much slower publication schedule than with previous editions with a focus on quality and profit and "the D&D teams knows that they have plenty of great campaign settings in their back pocket and are either actively developing more settings or have ideas for them further down the line". Francesco Cacciatore of Polygon noted that the 3rd Edition Forgotten Realms Campaign Setting (2001) sourcebook was "an ambitious attempt at a comprehensive look at the Realms, and while many locations remained sketched, it was still enough to feed our imagination (and campaigns) for decades". However, its 4th Edition "equivalent" was overlooked by many players "due to the mess that the Spellplague event was, lore-wise" and while "players were excited for a 'return to form' for the Forgotten Realms" when the 5th Edition undid most Spellplague changes, details have been "limited in scope" since "the majority of D&D 5e products set in the Forgotten Realms focused on the Sword Coast and its adjacent areas". Following the announcement of the Adventures in Faerûn (2025) for the revised 5th Edition, Cacciatore commented that while he was "disappointed" to see two regions previously explored in 5th Edition campaign books would be included, he was also "excited to get the first good glimpse at the Dales, Calimshan, and the Moonshae Isles in more than two decades".

== See also ==
- List of Forgotten Realms modules and sourcebooks
- List of Forgotten Realms novels
- List of Dungeons & Dragons comic books
- List of Dungeons & Dragons video games
