= Michael Dobson (author) =

American writer

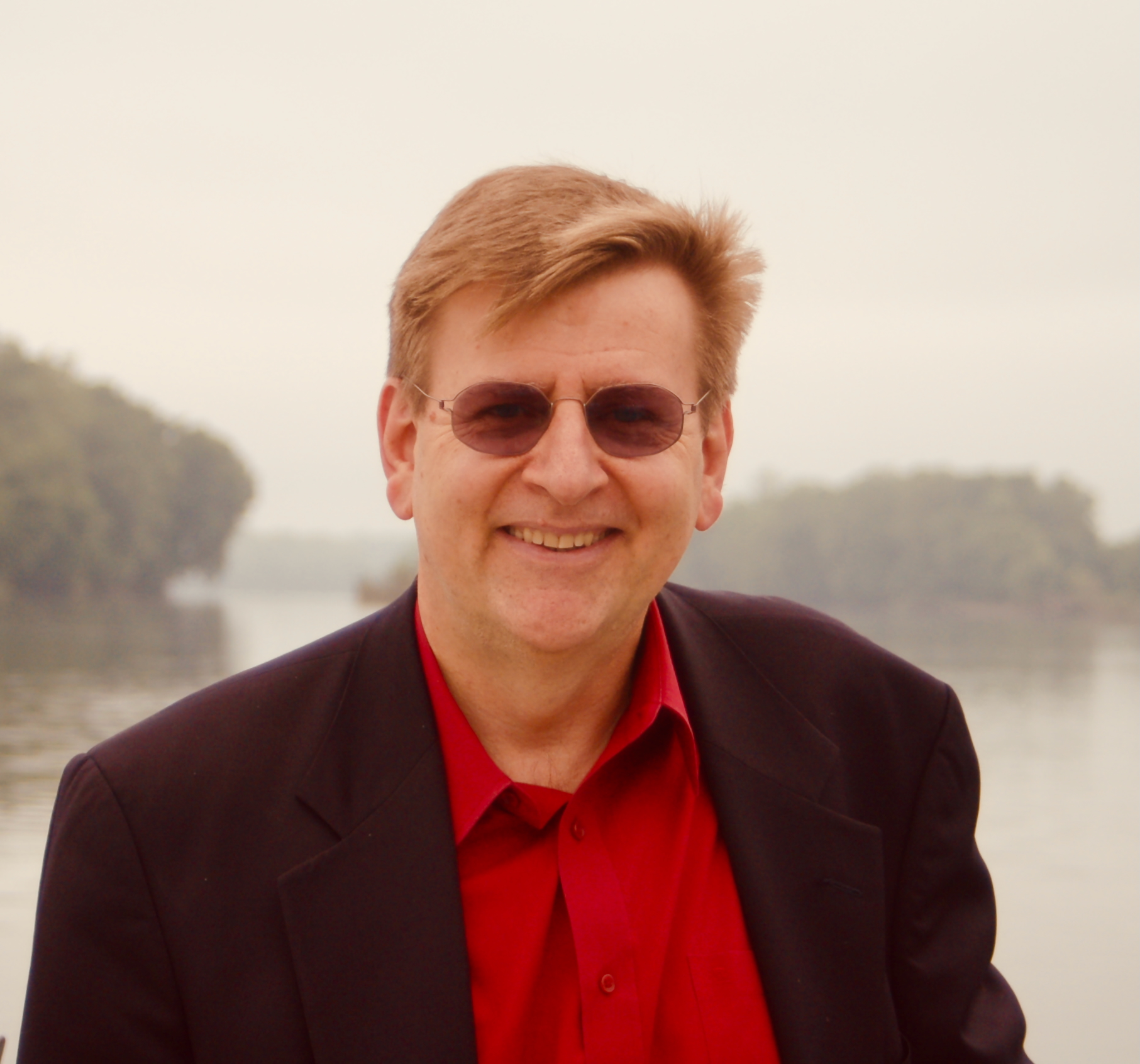
- Michael Dobson in 2009
- Born: Michael S. Dobson; September 12, 1952 (age 73); Charlotte, North Carolina, U.S.
- Occupations: Game designer, author
- Writing career
- Genre: Role-playing games

Michael S. Dobson (born September 9, 1952, in Charlotte, North Carolina) is an American author in the fields of business (particularly office politics and project management), alternate history novels (relating to World War II) and role-playing game adventures (Dungeons & Dragons, Indiana Jones, and Buck Rogers XXVC).

== Early life ==
Dobson's family moved from North Carolina to Germany when he was a child; his father had spent the latter part of World War II in a POW camp and had grown adjusted to German hospitality. The Dobson family returned to the United States five years later in 1960. Dobson later lived in Decatur, Alabama, but he felt that he did not fit in well in the South. "I still can't play a Civil War game to this day." Having trouble in school, and having had enough of the Deep South, he moved back to Charlotte for college. During college, he was employed as a faculty member teaching freshman composition and science fiction. Dobson graduated from the University of North Carolina at Charlotte with a bachelors degree with an English/writing major.

== Career ==
Dobson worked at three jobs after college: a typist, substitute teacher, and a planetarium operator on weekends. "I worked real hard to get a real job," explained Dobson, "and I was finally hired as a research assistant in the Aeronautics Department of the National Air and Space Museum of the Smithsonian Institute [sic] in Washington, D.C. It was a great first job!" In 1976, Dobson began overseeing the business operations of the Albert Einstein Spacearium at the Smithsonian, and then running a résumé business in 1979. Dobson was hired as an editor at TSR, Inc. in December 1983, and moved to Lake Geneva, Wisconsin with his fiancée Debbie Singer, whom he had met in the resume business; they married on the Fourth of July in 1984. "The first three projects I worked on at TSR never appeared in print," recalls Dobson. "I got a special satisfaction out of editing wargames. They were tough, but I loved the preciseness and detail." The projects he edited included the Dragonlance series, as well as the Battlesystem fantasy combat supplement, which won the H.G. Wells Award at the 1986 Origins Game Fair. In 1985, Dobson was asked to join the Marketing Department and ended up as Marketing Manager. In March 1986, Dobson became the Director of Games Development. As a game designer, his credits included the four-module AD&D-game Bloodstone Pass series with Douglas Niles, and X10, Red Arrow, Black Shield, both of which involved the Battlesystem rules; Dobson also co-designed the Partyzone Knave of Hearts game with Debbie. Dobson switched fields yet again to become a seminar leader in 1990, with authorship of several management books, tapes and videos to his credit, including several co-authored with his wife, Deborah Singer Dobson, who works in human resources. The publication of Fox on the Rhine in 2000 marked the beginnings of Dobson's forays into alternate history.

In his RPG and alternate history books, he has frequently collaborated with Douglas Niles.

== Bibliography ==
=== Business ===
- The Juggler's Guide to Managing Multiple Projects (1995)
- Coping with Supervisory Nightmares (1997) with Deborah Singer Dobson, Kelly Scanlon, and Rod Hankins
- Managing Up: 59 Ways to Build a Career-advancing Relationship with Your Boss (2000) with Deborah Singer Dobson
- Project Management for the Technical Professional (2001)
- Enlightened Office Politics (2001) with Deborah Singer Dobson
- The Triple Constraints in Project Management (2004)
- Goal Setting: How to Create an Action Plan and Achieve Your Goals (2008) with Susan B. Wilson

=== Alternate history ===
- Fox on the Rhine (2000) with Douglas Niles
- Fox at the Front (2003) with Douglas Niles
- MacArthur's War: A Novel of the Invasion of Japan (2007) with Douglas Niles
