= Douglas Niles =

American writer & game designer

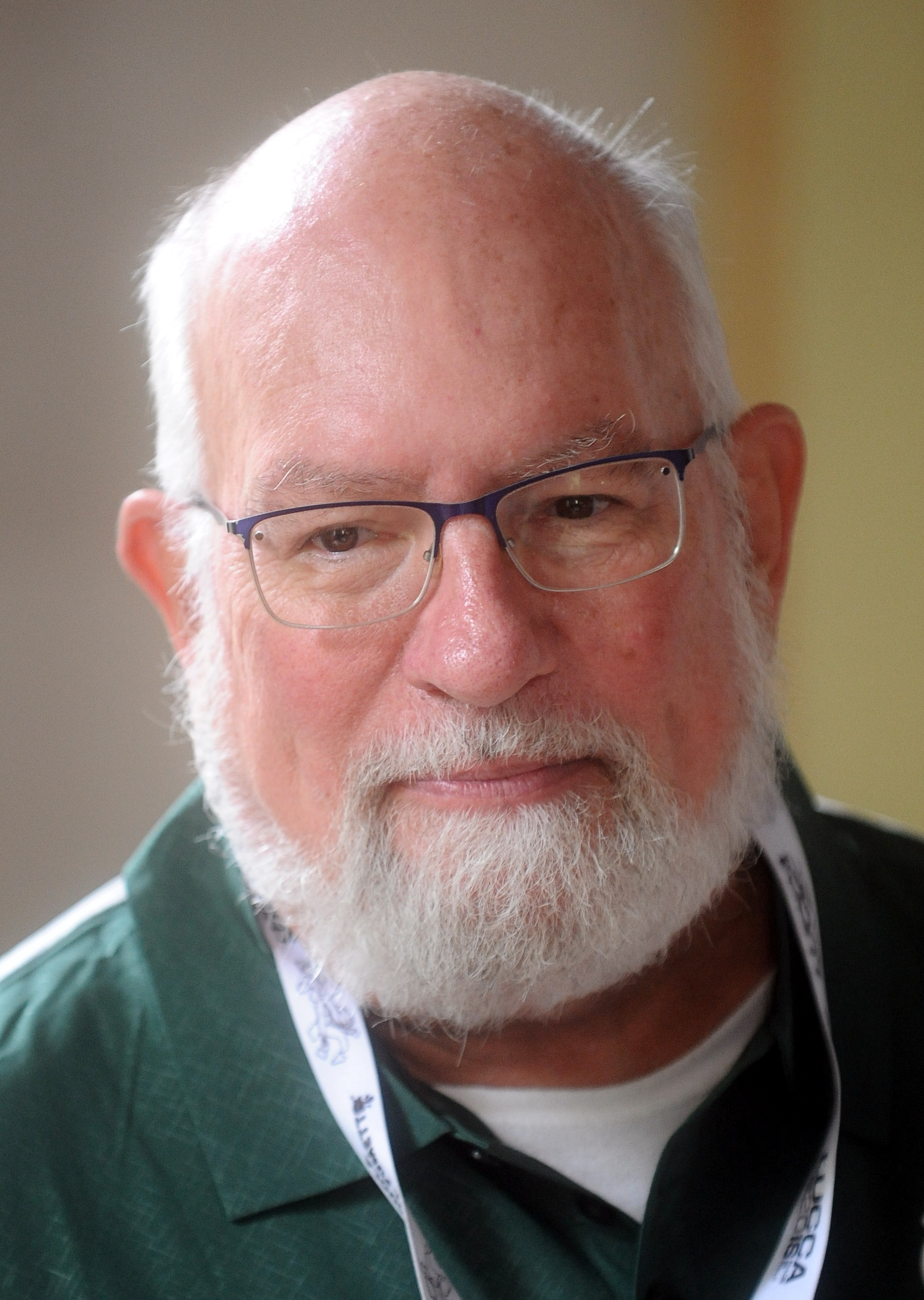
- Douglas Niles at Lucca Comics & Games 2018
- Born: Douglas Niles; December 1, 1954 (age 71); Brookfield, Wisconsin, U.S.
- Occupations: Game designer, novelist
- Spouse: Christine Schroeder Niles
- Writing career
- Genre: Role-playing games

Douglas Niles (born December 1, 1954, in Brookfield, Wisconsin) is a fantasy author and game designer. Niles was one of the creators of the Dragonlance world and the author of the first three Forgotten Realms novels, the Star Frontiers space opera setting and the Top Secret S/I espionage role-playing game.

== Early life and education ==
Niles was born in Brookfield, Wisconsin, a suburb of Milwaukee, and his family moved to Nashotah, a small town to the north, when he was twelve years old. Niles developed an interest in heroic fantasy, as well as wargaming, and began writing short stories and making short films in high school. Niles attended the University of Wisconsin–Oshkosh, where he majored in speech and minored in English. While there, he met Chris Schroeder, whom he married three years later.

After graduation, Niles began teaching Speech and English at Clinton High School, about 30 miles away from Lake Geneva, Wisconsin. “One day, one of my students came up and said she had a note to get out of class that afternoon because she was going to be interviewed by People magazine. Her name was Heidi Gygax. I asked her why People wanted to interview her, and she told me that her father had invented the Dungeons & Dragons game. Well, I had heard of D&D, but didn’t know that the designer lived so close to me. The next day, Heidi brought me a copy of the original D&D Basic Set, and two days later, I got some friends together and played my first game. I was the DM.”

== Career ==
A few years later, one of the players in Niles' D&D campaign went to work for Dragon magazine. According to Niles, “One day, he told me that TSR was hiring editors, and I applied for a job. I took the editing test, which consisted of a 14 page manuscript I was supposed to mark up. I only found three things to change. . . and flunked the test. But TSR was also hiring game designers, and so, armed with a half-written novel and some notes from my campaign, I applied for a design job. I went through five interviews, and gradually convinced them that I could do the job.” Niles was hired by TSR in January 1982, as a game designer. “For the first few weeks I reviewed and critiqued outside submissions, and I wasn’t too good at it. I kept pestering my boss, Al Hammack, for a design assignment, and finally he gave me an old brief for a novice-level module, Cult of the Reptile God, and told me to write it. I completed it in four weeks, and it was published. I don’t know whether they liked it because it was good, or because I did it in only four weeks.” Niles worked on more than just D&D for TSR, “In the summer of 1982, I designed my first game, the Knight Hawks rules for the Star Frontiers game, with much help from my editor, Steve Winter.”

Niles produced several modules for the D&D game, including X3 Curse of Xanathon, B5 Horror on the Hill, CM1 Test of the Warlords, and H1 Bloodstone Pass, and Dragonlance modules DL2 Dragons of Flame, DL6 Dragons of Ice, DL9 Dragons of Deceit, and DL11 Dragons of Glory. Niles is the designer of 1985's World War II: European Theatre of Operations, a grand strategic game. Niles worked on the Battlesystem Supplement, Star Frontiers modules SF4 Mission to Alcazzar and SFKH1 Dramune Run, Indiana Jones module IJ2 Raiders of the Lost Ark, the World War II Game, the Sirocco Strategy Game (with Zeb Cook), and the Endless Quest books EQ #26 Tarzan and the Well of Slaves and Super EQ #3 Escape From Castle Quarras for TSR. Tracy Hickman had gotten Harold Johnson, Jeff Grubb, Carl Smith, and Larry Elmore in on the idea of Dragonlance before Margaret Weis and Niles joined them. Niles authored the rulebook Dungeoneer's Survival Guide (1986). Niles was already working on a trilogy of novels with a Celtic theme to be published by TSR, Ltd., which he then modified to become the first novels set in the Forgotten Realms, starting with Darkwalker on Moonshae (1987). Niles also co-authored The City of Greyhawk boxed set with Carl Sargent, for which he designed the 96-page booklet Greyhawk: Gem of the Flanaess. Niles and Paul Lidberg designed the board game A Line in the Sand (1991), which focused on the Gulf War between the US and Iraq; it was one of the projects originating from TSR West, and was published the day the US started bombing because Flint Dille convinced the company president to move quickly.

Niles has written numerous novels, mainly for the Dragonlance series. Niles is one of the most prolific Dragonlance authors, and in addition to Wizard's Conclave, his Dragonlance titles include The Icewall Trilogy (The Messenger, The Golden Orb, Winterheim), Emperor of Ansalon, The Dragons, The Puppet King, Fistandantilus Reborn, Flint the King (with Mary Kirchoff), and The Last Thane. He contributed nine novels to the Forgotten Realms line, including the Moonshae trilogy and two further trilogies in the Forgotten Realms. He has won both the H.G. Wells award and the Origins award for his work in developing adventure games. In 1990, he left TSR to write fantasy fiction.

Niles has written two World War II alternate history novels, Fox on the Rhine and Fox at the Front (co-authored with Michael Dobson). Released in hardcover by Forge, a division of TOR, "Fox" has been both a main selection of the Military Book Club and a Featured selection of the Science Fiction Book Club. Niles and Dobson also later wrote the World War II alternate history novel MacArthur's War.

Niles has created two fantasy worlds in books published by Ace Fantasy. The Watershed Trilogy (A Breach in the Watershed, Darkenheight, The War of Three Waters) was completed in the late 1990s, and it features a continent divided by mountains into three distinct basins: watersheds of pure, normal water; of magical liquid (Aura); and of vile, poisonous Darkblood. Circle at Center, Worldfall, and The Goddess Worldweaver form the Seven Circles Trilogy, which details a cosmos in which historical characters from Earth can be drawn into the realms of magic, through sorcery both deadly and erotic.

Niles has designed dozens of games for TSR, Inc. and SPI, including award-winning boardgames based on Tom Clancy's novels The Hunt for Red October and Red Storm Rising, and has also created numerous historical military boardgames, including the massive games European Theatre of Operations and Pacific Theatre of Operations.

== Personal life ==
Niles resides in Delavan, in the Wisconsin countryside, with his wife Christine and his son David. His daughter, Allison, served overseas as part of Operation Iraqi Freedom. His hobbies include hiking, bicycling, playing the guitar, and spending time with his friends and family.

== Bibliography ==
=== Nonfiction ===
- A Noble Cause: American Battlefield Victories in Vietnam ( 2015 )

=== Novels ===
- Horror on the Hill (1983)
- Tarzan and the Well of Slaves (1985)
- Winds of Change (1992)
- The Rod of Seven Parts (1996)
- The Odyssey of Gilthanas (1999) (with Steve Miller)
- War of the Worlds: New Millennium (2005)
- MacArthur's War: A Novel of the Invasion of Japan (2007) (with Michael Dobson)
- Top Secret/S.I. Administrators Guide TSR, Inc 1987

==== Series ====
===== "Fox" series =====
- Fox on the Rhine (2000) (with Michael Dobson)
- Fox at the Front (2003) (with Michael Dobson)

===== Watershed =====
- A Breach in the Watershed (1995)
- Darkenheight (1996)
- War of Three Waters (1997)

===== Chaos War =====
- Seeds of Chaos (1998)
- Chaos Spawn (1999)

===== Seven Circles =====
- Circle at Center (2000)
- World Fall (2001)
- The Goddess Worldweaver (2003)

==== Series contributed ====
===== Dragonlance =====
- Dragons of Glory (1986) with Margaret Weis
- Lords of Doom (1986)
- Dragons of Triumph (1986)

===== Forgotten Realms : The Moonshae Trilogy =====
- Darkwalker on Moonshae (1987)
- Black Wizards (1988)
- Darkwell (1989)

===== Forgotten Realms : Maztica Trilogy =====
- Ironhelm (1990)
- Viperhand (1990)
- Feathered Dragon (1991)

===== Dragonlance : Preludes II =====
- Flint, the King (1990)

===== Dragonlance : Elven Nations =====
- The Kinslayer Wars (1991)

===== Forgotten Realms : Druidhome =====
- Prophet of Moonshae (1992)
- The Coral Kingdom (1992)
- The Druid Queen (1993)

===== Dragonlance : Villains =====
- Emperor of Ansalon (1993)

===== Dragonlance : Lost Histories =====
- The Kagonesti (1995)
- The Dragons (1996)

===== First Quest =====
- Pawns Prevail (1995)
- Suitors Duel (1995)
- Immortal Game (1996) ISBN 0-7869-0478-X

===== Dragonlance : Lost Legends =====
- Fistandantilus Reborn (1997)

===== Dragonlance : Chaos War =====
- The Last Thane (1998)
- The Puppet King (1999)

===== Dragonlance : Icewall =====
- The Messenger (2001)
- The Golden Orb (2001)
- Winterheim (2003)

===== Dragonlance : Age of Mortals =====
- Wizards' Conclave (2004)

===== Dragonlance : Rise of Solamnia =====
- Lord Of The Rose (2005)
- The Crown and Sword (2006)
- The Measure and the Truth (2007)

===== Dragonlance : Dwarf Home =====
- The Secret of Pax Tharkas (2007)
- Heir of Kayolin (2008)
- The Fate of Thorbardin (2009)

==== Top Secret/S.I. ====
- Administrators Guide Orion (1987) Game Design
