= The Lost Caverns of Tsojcanth =

Role-playing game adventure

- The cover of The Lost Caverns of Tsojcanth, with art by Erol Otus. The artwork depicts a group of adventurers confronting a behir.
- Code: S4
- TSR product code: 9061
- Rules required: Advanced Dungeons & Dragons 1st edition
- Character levels: 6-10
- Campaign setting: Generic or Greyhawk
- Authors: Gary Gygax
- First published: 1982 (1976)

Linked modules
- S1 S2 S3 S4

The Lost Caverns of Tsojcanth is an adventure module for the Dungeons & Dragons fantasy role-playing game. It was written by Gary Gygax and published by TSR in 1982 for the first edition Advanced Dungeons & Dragons (AD&D) rules. The 64-page adventure bears the code "S4" ("S" for "special") and is set in the Greyhawk campaign setting. It is divided into two parts, a 32-page adventure, and a 32-page booklet of monsters and magic items. The plot involves the player characters investigating rumors of lost treasure. After traversing a wilderness and two levels of dungeons, the players face Drelnza, the vampiric daughter of long-deceased archmage Iggwilv.

The Lost Caverns of Tsojcanth is a revised and expanded version of The Lost Caverns of Tsojconth, a tournament adventure that Gygax wrote for the 1976 WinterCon V gaming convention. Gygax expanded the tournament adventure by adding a wilderness area, with part of it based on earlier work by Rob Kuntz. Work on the adventure delayed the completion of The Temple of Elemental Evil, another Gygax adventure. The Lost Caverns of Tsojcanth was included in the 1987 supermodule Realms of Horror, and updated for v3.5 in an online edition in 2007. It was well received by critics, ranked the 22nd greatest Dungeons & Dragons adventure of all time by Dungeon magazine in 2004. A White Dwarf reviewer gave the adventure 9/10, noting its difficulty and rewards of powerful magic. It is part of a series along with S1: Tomb of Horrors, S2: White Plume Mountain, S3: Expedition to the Barrier Peaks. It also has a loosely connected sequel: The Forgotten Temple of Tharizdun.

== Plot summary ==
In the Yatil Mountains south of Perrenland there is rumored to be a magical hoard of unsurpassed value, a treasure of such fame that scores of adventurers have perished in search of it. Find the perilous Lost Caverns of Tsojcanth and you may gain the hidden wealth of the long-dead arch-mage — if you live.

— Cover blurb for The Lost Caverns of Tsojcanth

The introduction, with instructions that the Dungeon Master read it aloud to the players, outlines that there is a treasure in the Yatil Mountains south of the Greyhawk realm of Perrenland. The player characters must investigate rumors of a lost treasure that scores of adventurers have perished attempting to find. The treasure is a remnant of the wealth amassed by the archmage Iggwilv, former ruler of Perrenland, prior to her presumed death at the hands of the demon Graz'zt, whom she had "imprisoned and forced into servitude." The players must first traverse a wilderness area with 20 numbered encounters before arriving at the caverns. The encounters have names such as "Border Patrol" (encounter 1) and "Hill Giants" (encounter 10). After the wilderness are two lettered encounters: the "Gnome Vale", which includes a map for their lair, and "The Craggy Dells", where humans and orcs are capturing hippogriffs to sell.

Next, the player characters reach the caverns. They consist of the "Lesser Caverns" with 22 encounters, and the "Greater Caverns" with 20 encounters, each with its own map. The lesser caverns include encounters such as "Stinking Cave" (encounter 5) which contains four trolls and "Underground Lake" (encounter 14). The greater caverns include encounters such as "Uneven-Floored Cavern" (encounter 5) where the player characters face an umber hulk and "Canyon of Centaurs" (encounter 9). The 20th and final encounter is titled "The Inner Sphere". Here, a "woman sleeps on an alabaster slab." She is "armored from toe to neck in gold chased plate mail." The woman is actually Drelnza, a fighter/vampire and the daughter of Iggwilv. After defeating Drelnza, the players are rewarded with treasure, and the adventure ends.

== Publication history ==
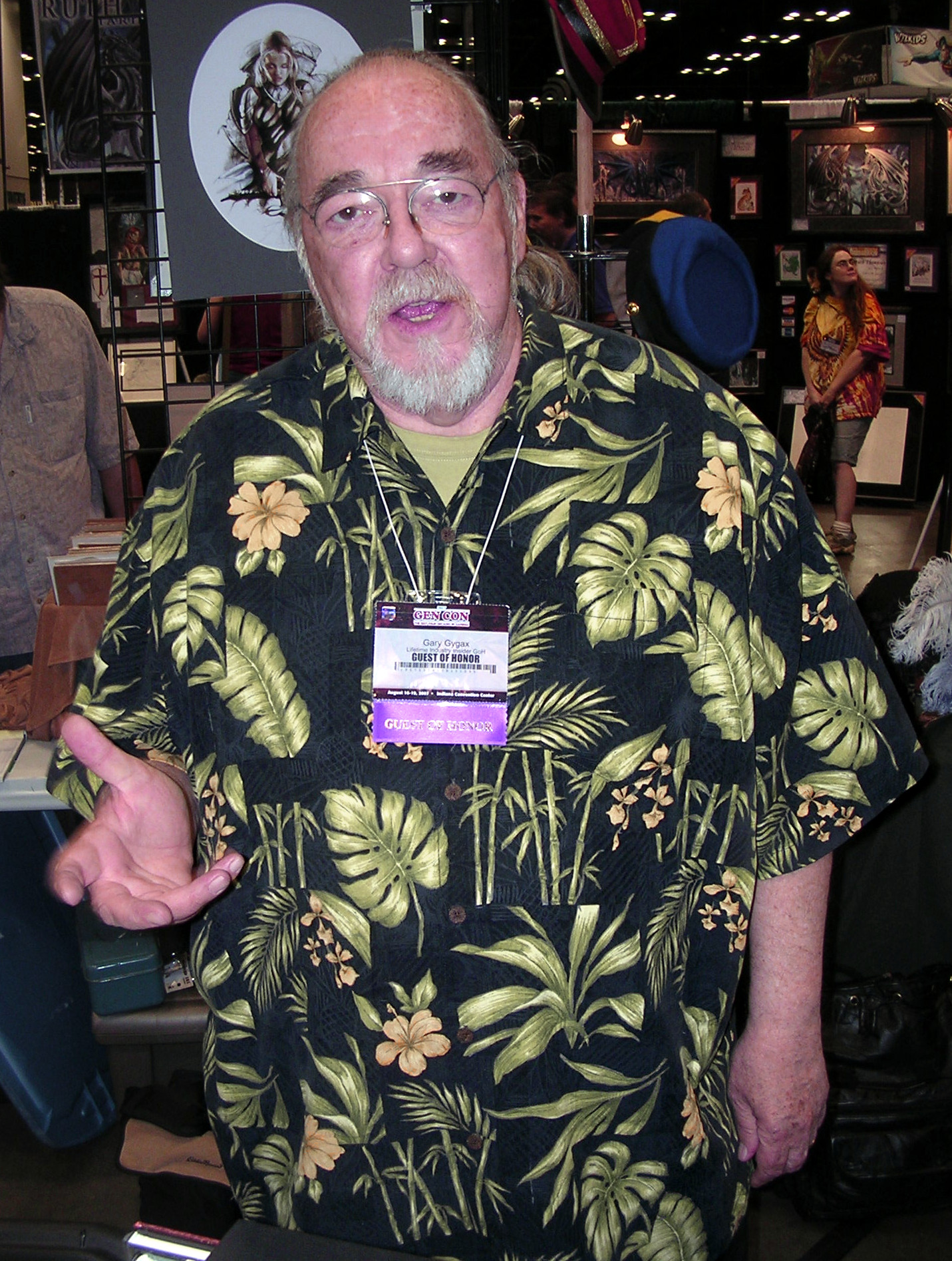
Author Gary Gygax in 2007 at the GenCon game convention

The Lost Caverns of Tsojcanth is a revised and expanded version of The Lost Caverns of Tsojconth, a tournament adventure that Gygax wrote for WinterCon V, a gaming convention sponsored by the Metro Detroit Gamers (MDG) in 1976. It is based in part on one of Rob Kuntz's dungeon levels, as Kuntz helped Gygax revise the tournament version. This original version consisted of eight loose sheets in an outer folder, with a zip-locked bag; only several hundred copies were printed. In the May 1980 issue of Dragon, Gygax said "Rob Kuntz has the reworked Lost Caverns module which must be finalized" and that "We want to get it into print as soon as possible." Lawrence Schick later suggested that "there's evidence that Gary considered Tsojcanth part of a longer Greyhawk campaign, placing the adventure between T1–T4 The Temple of Elemental Evil and WG4 The Forgotten Temple of Tharizdun. (By this reckoning, The Village of Hommlet, The Temple of Elemental Evil, and Tsojcanth are thus the "lost" WG1 through WG3 modules.) So, Tsojcanth was published in the S series because it got completed out of order, but was too good to delay."

In 1980, Gygax began rewriting the adventure for first edition AD&D, expanding it to include outdoor encounters. The redevelopment of The Lost Caverns of Tsojcanth was one of the major delays in the completion of The Temple of Elemental Evil. This version of the module was revised and expanded from the original, and included two 32-page books, with an outer folder. In the November 1981 issue of Dragon, Gygax said that TSR needed a competition-level module and that "the effort needed to finish the second hundred or so pages of Elemental Evil went into preparation of The Lost Caverns of Tsojcanth. The scenario was initially done for a convention tournament, but the new product has an extensive outdoor adventure and a completely new series of encounters". While in the middle of working on Temple of Elemental Evil, Gygax added a complete outdoor story arc to the original tournament story arc that leads to the caverns. The Lost Caverns of Tsojcanth includes new spells, and many new monsters which were later featured in Monster Manual II.

The Forgotten Temple of Tharizdun (1982) starts off from an event in The Lost Caverns of Tsojcanth and features monsters from the Fiend Folio. In 1987, The Lost Caverns of Tsojcanth was revised and included in TSR's "supermodule" Realms of Horror. In 2007, it was updated to v3.5 and included as one of three parts in Iggwilv's Legacy: The Lost Caverns of Tsojcanth, an adventure available online from Wizards of the Coast.

Both versions of the module included monsters that were later included other Dungeons & Dragons products. The monsters introduced in the original un-published version were updated for AD&D rules and included in the first edition Monster Manual. Monsters appearing in the published version included the demon princes Baphomet, Fraz-Urb'luu, Graz'zt, and Kostchtchie, who later appeared in the original Monster Manual II. The published module's cover features an illustration of a behir by Erol Otus.

All four modules of the S-series were collected and published as part of the Dungeons of Dread hardcover volume, released on March 19, 2013. Lawrence Schick writes in the foreword that "S4 The Lost Caverns of Tsojcanth marked the end of the S series—and rightly so, because despite being based on a gilded-hole dungeon originally designed for a tournament in 1976, its updated version really belonged more to the '80s campaign-setting school of design than to the wild-and-woolly '70s. S1 through S3 were standalone modules that could be easily dropped into any DM's campaign, but Tsojcanth is firmly based in Gary's World of Greyhawk."

A remastered version of the adventure was published in the anthology Quests from the Infinite Staircase for Dungeons & Dragons 5th edition on July 16, 2024.

== Reception ==
The Lost Caverns of Tsojcanth was favorably received by critics. Lawrence Schick, in his 1991 book Heroic Worlds, described the adventure as "A monster-filled labyrinth in the classic mode: kill 'em, rob 'em, and leave." It was ranked the 22nd-greatest Dungeons & Dragons adventure of all time by Dungeon magazine in 2004, on the 30th anniversary of the Dungeons & Dragons game. Dungeon's editors felt that the "pedestrian character of the caverns echoes the adventure's primordial nature", while its complicated wilderness setting and large second booklet set it apart from other adventures of the time. The booklet introduced 30 new creatures, including the derro and the demon lords Baphomet and Graz'zt. The reviewers felt that the adventure's defining moment was when the players find Iggwilv's "fabled treasure": her vampire daughter Drelzna.

Jim Bambra reviewed the adventure for White Dwarf. He gave it 9/10 overall, with 9/10 for presentation, rules, playability, enjoyment, skill, and complexity. Bambra noted that the module ended a long time off for Gary Gygax, and was "very tough" and that good play was stressed in the introduction. Sub par play quickly ended the story, but the rewards of powerful magic and the satisfaction of completing a difficult task made it worthwhile. He also noted that the adventure came with a 32-page booklet with 30 new monsters and a small amount of new magic. Not all the new creatures are featured in the plot, but they can be used by the DM in other adventures. Also, magical diagrams are given an in-depth treatment, including their creation and effectiveness.

James Jacobs credits Gary Gygax's work on The Lost Caverns of Tsojcanth for inspiration on Jacobs's work on the "Demonomicon of Iggwilv" column in Dragon magazine.
