= Endless Quest =

1982–1996 American gamebook series

Cover of Dungeon of Dread

The Endless Quest books were three series of gamebooks. The first two series were released in the 1980s and 1990s by TSR, while the third series was released by Wizards of the Coast. Originally, these books were the result of an Educational department established by TSR with the intention of developing curriculum programs for subjects such as reading, math, history, and problem solving.

The first series of 36 books was released from 1982 to 1987, the second series of 13 from 1994 to 1996.

These were respectively the first and last gamebooks released by TSR. A short spin-off series of 4 Endless Quest: Crimson Crystal Adventures books were also released during 1985. There were also several series of similar books that did not bear the Endless Quest name.

The mechanics of these books involved simple choices in the style of Choose Your Own Adventure books, rather than the game-like randomized elements of Fighting Fantasy gamebooks. However, the stories and characters in an Endless Quest book, while not necessarily more complex than in a Choose Your Own Adventure book, are often more fully developed because the Endless Quest books are much longer. For example, the character referred to as "you" in the text almost always has a name, gender, and backstory. The result is that the books in the Endless Quest series resemble miniature novels with many different endings.

The majority of the books in the series were based on Dungeons & Dragons (D&D), but some were based on other TSR games (e.g. Gamma World, Top Secret) or even licensed properties (e.g. Conan, Tarzan).

Mirrorstone, a division of Wizards of the Coast that publishes fantasy fiction for children and teens, began republishing the Endless Quest series in January 2008. The first book in the series is a revision of Claw of the Dragon (#34 from Series One). They have updated the book, including making it gender neutral so it can be enjoyed by both boys and girls, and plan to update and publish more of the D&D books pending the success of this first title.

== Endless Quest: Series One ==
Endless Quest: Series One
#	Title	Setting	Author	Published	Cover art	Interior art	ISBN
1	Dungeon of Dread	D&D	Rose Estes	Jun 1982	Larry Elmore	Jim Holloway	0-935696-86-5
2	Mountain of Mirrors	D&D	Rose Estes	Jun 1982	Larry Elmore	Jim Holloway	0-935696-87-3
3	Pillars of Pentegarn	D&D	Rose Estes	Jun 1982	Larry Elmore	Harry J Quinn	0-935696-92-X
4	Return to Brookmere	D&D	Rose Estes	Jun 1982	Larry Elmore	Timothy Truman	0-935696-93-8
5	Revolt of the Dwarves	D&D	Rose Estes	Jan 1983	Larry Elmore	Jim Holloway	0-88038-020-9
6	Revenge of the Rainbow Dragons	D&D	Rose Estes	Jan 1983	Jeff Easley	Harry J Quinn	0-88038-021-7
7	Hero of Washington Square	Top Secret	Rose Estes	May 1983	Jeff Easley	Timothy Truman	0-88038-022-5
8	Villains of Volturnus	Star Frontiers	Jean Blashfield	May 1983	Larry Elmore	Jim Roslof	0-88038-023-3
9	Robbers and Robots	Top Secret	Mike Carr	Jul 1983	Larry Elmore	Vernon Posey	0-88038-036-5
10	Circus of Fear	D&D	Rose Estes	Jul 1983	Keith Parkinson	Kevin Nichols	0-88038-037-3
11	Spell of the Winter Wizard	D&D	Linda Lowery	Aug 1983	Larry Elmore	Jeffrey R. Busch	0-88038-054-3
12	Light on Quests Mountain	Gamma World	Mary L. Kirchoff; James M. Ward	Aug 1983	Keith Parkinson	Steve McAfee	0-88038-055-1
13	Dragon of Doom	D&D	Rose Estes	Nov 1983	Clyde Caldwell	Harry J Quinn	0-88038-100-0
14	Raid on Nightmare Castle	D&D	Catherine McGuire	Nov 1983	Jeff Easley	Jim Holloway	0-88038-101-9
15	Under Dragon's Wing	D&D	John Kendall	Feb 1984	Larry Elmore	Sam Grainger	0-88038-076-4
16	The Dragon's Ransom	D&D	Laura French	Feb 1984	Clyde Caldwell	Doug Chaffee	0-88038-077-2
17	Captive Planet	Star Frontiers	Morris Simon	Jul 1984	Clyde Caldwell	Sam Grainger	0-88038-078-0
18	King's Quest	D&D	Tom McGowen	Jul 1984	Ben Otero	Kevin Nichols	0-88038-079-9
19	Conan the Undaunted	Hyborian Age	James M. Ward	Jun 1984	Clyde Caldwell	Doug Chaffee	0-88038-120-5
20	Conan and the Prophecy	Hyborian Age	Roger E. Moore	Jun 1984	Keith Parkinson	Sam Grainger	0-88038-121-3
21	Duel of the Masters	D&D	Chris Martindale	Sep 1984	Clyde Caldwell	Keith Parkinson	0-88038-154-X
22	The Endless Catacombs	D&D	Margaret Weis	Sep 1984	Jeff Easley	Jeff Easley	0-88038-162-0
23	Blade of the Young Samurai	D&D	Morris Simon	Nov 1984	Clyde Caldwell	Gary Williams	0-88038-155-8
24	Trouble on Artule	Star Frontiers	Catherine McGuire	Nov 1984	Jeff Easley	Mitchell O'Connell	0-88038-169-8
25	Conan the Outlaw	Hyborian Age	Roger E. Moore	Dec 1984	Keith Parkinson	Ron Randall	0-88038-222-8
26	Tarzan and the Well of Slaves	Tarzan	Douglas Niles	Jan 1985	Larry Elmore	Ben Otero	0-394-73968-X 0-88038-206-6
27	Lair of the Lich	D&D	Bruce Algozin	Mar 1985	Jeff Easley	Jim Roslof	0-88038-212-0
28	Mystery of the Ancients	Gamma World	Morris Simon	May 1985	Keith Parkinson	Doug Chaffee	0-88038-217-1
29	Tower of Darkness	D&D	Regina Oehler Fultz	Jul 1985	Jeff Easley	Mark Nelson	0-88038-204-X
30	The Fireseed	D&D	Morris Simon	Oct 1985	Larry Elmore	Jeffrey Butler	0-88038-171-X
31	Tarzan and the Tower of Diamonds	Tarzan	Richard Reinsmith	Dec 1985	Jeff Easley	Jeffrey Butler	0-394-74188-9 0-88038-205-8
32	Prisoner of Elderwood	D&D	Bruce Algozin	Feb 1986	Jeff Easley	Gary Williams	0-88038-283-X
33	Knight of Illusion	D&D	Mary L. Kirchoff	Jun 1986	Clyde Caldwell	Sam Grainger; Jim Holloway	0-88038-284-8
34	Claw of the Dragon	D&D	Bruce Algozin	Sep 1986	Clyde Caldwell	Stephen Fabian	0-88038-306-2
35	Vision of Doom	D&D	Mary L. Kirchoff	Dec 1986	Ben Otero	George Barr	0-88038-307-0
36	Song of the Dark Druid	D&D	Josepha Sherman	Mar 1987	Jeff Easley	Jim Holloway	0-88038-442-5

=== Collectors' sets ===
1. contains Books 1–4, ISBN 0-88038-056-X
2. contains Books 5–8, ISBN 0-88038-057-8
3. contains Books 9–12, ISBN 0-88038-163-9
4. contains Books 13–16, ISBN 0-39472-777-0

== Endless Quest: Crimson Crystal Adventures ==
TSR also released a spin-off series of four Endless Quest: Crimson Crystal Adventures books during 1985. These books add a small twist in the form of a clear sheet of red plastic that comes stapled to the inside. This plastic piece is removed and then overlaid on top of certain portions of the book to reveal hidden images (by acting as an optical filter).

Endless Quest: Crimson Crystal Adventures
#	Title	Setting	Author	Published	Cover art	Interior art	ISBN
1	Riddle of the Griffon	D&D	Susan Lawson (pseudonym for Margaret Weis and Roger E. Moore)	March, 1985	Keith Parkinson	Mario D. Macari, Jr. Gary Williams	0-880382-10-4
2	Search for the Pegasus	D&D	Roger E. Moore	March, 1985	Clyde Caldwell	Mario D. Macari, Jr. Gary Williams	0-880382-11-2
3	Renegades of Luntar	Generic Sci-Fi	Roger E. Moore	June, 1985	Keith Parkinson	Mario D. Macari, Jr.	0-880382-18-X
4	Stop that Witch!	D&D	Mary Clark	September, 1985	Larry Elmore	Mario D. Macari, Jr.	0-880382-51-1

== Endless Quest: Series Two ==
The second series differed from the first in several ways: they were printed in smaller type, the section numbers were independent of the page numbers, they were based on different original games, and they were not officially numbered (collectors and gamers use the numbering shown below, continuing from series one, for convenience).

Endless Quest: Series Two
#	Title	Setting	Author	Published	Cover art	Interior art	ISBN
37	Dungeon of Fear	Dragon Strike	Michael Andrews	1994	Jeff Easley	Terry Dykstra	1-560768-35-5
38	Castle of the Undead	AD&D Ravenloft	Nick Baron	1994	Clyde Caldwell	Terry Dykstra	1-560768-36-3
39	Secret of the Djinn	AD&D Al-Qadim	Jean Rabe	1994	Jeff Easley	Terry Dykstra	1-560768-64-9
40	The Siege of the Tower	AD&D Greyhawk	Kem Antillies (pseudonym for Kevin J. Anderson and Rebecca Moesta)	1994	Jeff Easley	Terry Dykstra	1-560768-94-0
41	A Wild Ride	Wildspace	Louis Anderson	1994	Jeff Easley	Terry Dykstra	1-560769-28-9
42	Forest of Darkness	Dragon Strike	Michael Andrews		Jeff Easley	Terry Dykstra	1-560769-32-7
43	American Knights	Gamma World	Nick Pollotta	1995	Jeff Easley	Terry Dykstra	0-099540-21-5 1-560768-99-1
44	Night of the Tiger	AD&D Ravenloft	Jean Rabe	1995	Roger Loveless	Terry Dykstra	0-099540-81-9 0-786901-14-4
45	Galactic Challenge	Amazing Engine	Allen Varney	1995	Dennis Kauth	Terry Dykstra	0-786901-58-6
46	Bigby's Curse	AD&D Greyhawk	Anne K. Brown	1995	Jeff Easley	Terry Dykstra	0-786901-78-0
47	The 24-Hour War	Gamma World	Nick Pollotta	1995	Keith Parkinson	Terry Dykstra	0-786901-98-5
48	The Test*	AD&D Greyhawk	Wes Nicholson	1996			0-786904-85-2
49	Sands of Deception*	AD&D Al-Qadim	Jean Rabe	1996			0-786904-94-1

* These were never released. The Test was written, turned in, and ready to print, but dropped at the last minute. Sands of Deception was written, but dropped as well.

== Endless Quest (2018-9) ==
These books were all written by Matt Forbeck. Each one is loosely based on a Dungeons & Dragons 5th Edition campaign.

Endless Quest (2018-2019)
Title	Module	Published	ISBN
Escape the Underdark	Out of the Abyss	2018	9781787410510
Big Trouble	Storm King's Thunder	2018	9781536202441
Into the Jungle	Tomb of Annihilation	2018	9781536202410
To Catch a Thief	Waterdeep: Dragon Heist	2018	9781536200669
Escape from Castle Ravenloft	Curse of Strahd	2019	9781536209235
The Mad Mage's Academy	Waterdeep: Dungeon of the Mad Mage	2019	9781536209259

== Related series ==
The related Super Endless Quest series changed its name to Advanced Dungeons & Dragons Adventure Gamebooks starting with the fourth book; these books added a more complex game system to stories that otherwise share the same style with the Endless Quest books. A bookmark-style insert was provided with simple Dungeons & Dragons statistics for the book's main character, and a dice-rolling mechanic was added for determining the character's fate within the story.

The Fantasy Forest series of gamebooks (1982–1983) is quite similar to the Endless Quest books, but it is aimed at a somewhat younger audience.

Other similar series from TSR included HeartQuest (interactive romances, set in the world of Dungeons & Dragons), Catacombs Solo Quest (more complex again than Super Endless Quest, starting with Faerie Mound of Dragonkind), and 1 on 1 Adventure Gamebooks that were each a pair of books for two players/readers.

TSR also used the Advanced Dungeons & Dragons Adventure Gamebooks format for books tied into their Marvel Super Heroes roleplaying game, published as single-character Adventure Gamebooks, and later as 1 on 1 Adventure Gamebooks, and featuring licensed Marvel Comics characters.

== Reception ==
The first four Endless Quest books were reviewed by Marcus Rowland in White Dwarf #39 (March 1983). Rowland rated Pillars of Pentegarn as 5 out of 10, Mountain of Mirrors as 4 out of 10, Dungeon of Dread as 6 out of 10, and Return to Brookmere as 7 out of 10. Rowland also reviewed the next two books in the series, giving both Revolt of the Dwarves and Revenge of the Rainbow Dragons 5 out of 10.

== Reviews ==
- Isaac Asimov's Science Fiction Magazine
- Jeux & Stratégie #31
- Jeux & Stratégie #39
- Science Fiction Chronicle
