= The Temple of Elemental Evil (disambiguation) =

The Temple of Elemental Evil is an adventure module for the fantasy role-playing game Dungeons & Dragons.

The Temple of Elemental Evil may also refer to:

- The Temple of Elemental Evil (novel), a 2001 fantasy novel by Thomas M. Reid
- The Temple of Elemental Evil (video game), a 2003 role-playing video game by Troika Games
