= Fantasy Forest =

Fantasy Forest is a series of ten gamebooks published by TSR, Inc. from 1983 to 1984. The books are works of children's literature; eight of them are set in the fantasy world of the Dungeons & Dragons role-playing game created by TSR, Inc., and two are set in TSR's science fiction world of Star Frontiers. They have been compared to other gamebook series, such as Choose Your Own Adventure or Endless Quest.

== Format ==
The series was based upon a concept created by Edward Packard and originally published as the "Adventures of You" series, starting with Packard's Sugarcane Island in 1976. Each story in the Fantasy Forest series is written from a second-person point of view, with the reader assuming the role of the protagonist and making choices that determine the main character's actions and the plot's outcome. Unlike many gamebooks in which the reader's character is left purposefully gender-neutral, there are several Fantasy Forest books in which the reader is placed in an unambiguously female protagonist's shoes.

== Books ==
No.	Title	Author	Publisher	Date	Genre	Illustrated by	Cover art	ISBN
1	The Ring, the Sword, and the Unicorn	James M. Ward	TSR, Inc.	1983	Fantasy	Mario Macari, Jr.	Jeff Easley	9780880380591
The only book in the series to start in a contemporary setting, the story opens on the main character, referred to by the narrator as "you", trying to prove to their siblings that there is a magical world in the forest behind their backyard.
2	Ruins of Rangar	Michael Carr	TSR, Inc.	1983	Fantasy	Mario Macari, Jr.	Jeff Easley	9780394723150
This book introduces the good knight Gregor and his struggle with the evil skeleton king, Nightshade. The reader takes on the role of his brother, Erik, a younger boy accompanying him. In addition to elves, dwarves, magic users, and zombies, this book includes lesser known creatures that are featured in the Dungeons & Dragons Monster Manual, such as "stirges" and an "umberhulk".
3	Shadowcastle	Michael Gray	TSR, Inc.	1983	Fantasy	Mario Macari, Jr.	Clyde Caldwell	9780880380614
The recurring characters of Nightshade and Sir Gregor, now referred to as the Good Knight of the Golden Dragon, are featured once again. Rather than reprising their role from the previous novel, the reader instead takes on the role of Molly, who is out picking berries when a halfling stumbles across her and asks for her help in rescuing his brother from the evil Nightshade.
4	Keep of the Ancient King	Michael Carr	TSR, Inc.	1983	Fantasy	Michael Fishel	Keith Parkinson	9780394723174
In this book, the reader takes on the role of Amy, whose beloved horse, Acorn, has been stolen by the Shadow Rider, a servant of Nightshade. They join Gregor the Good Knight in journeying to a castle and fighting monsters, where the Shadow Rider tries to tempt the reader with the promise of Acorn's safe return in exchange for betraying Gregor.
5	Dungeon of Darkness	John Kendall	TSR, Inc.	1984	Fantasy	Pamela Summertree	Ben Otero	9780880380638
As the only villager to escape capture during an attack by the Shadow Rider and Nightshade's troops, the reader joins forces with Gregor the Good Knight to rescue the other villagers.
6	Star Rangers and the Spy	Jean Blashfield, Beverly Charette	TSR, Inc.	1984	Science fiction	Mario Macari, Jr.	Joe DeVelasco	9780880380805
This book is set in the science fiction world of the Star Frontiers game world. The reader takes on the role of Ranger Chaylo, a human boy who is a member of a club called the Star Rangers. The other members are all alien children, such as Rama, who is a female apelike "Yazarian", Carrel, who is an insect-like "Vrusk", and Gogol, who is an amoeba-like but intelligent, humanoid "Dralasite", alien races used in the Star Frontiers role-playing game. The goal of the story is to stop MR. Drel, one of Chaylo's father's co-workers, from stealing an experimental starship and giving it to the "Sathar", another popular Star Frontiers alien, who plans on using it to invade other planets.
7	Castle in the Clouds	Morris Simon	TSR, Inc.	1984	Fantasy	Gary Williams	Jeff Easley	9780880381574
While investigating strange noises in the attic, the reader as the principal character, Mary, is transported to the magical kingdom of Perlon and must make appropriate choices to evade danger and to reach the Castle in the Clouds.
8	Star Rangers Meet the Solar Robot	Beverly Charette	TSR, Inc.	1984	Science fiction	Mario Macari, Jr.	Jeff Easley	9780880381567
The reader's choices will determine whether Chaylo and the other Star Rangers can prevent an experimental robot from destroying the Solar Star Station.
9	Jason's First Quest	Roger E. Moore	TSR, Inc.	1984	Science fiction	Ivor Janci	Ben Otero	9780394727882
In this book, the reader takes on the role of the character Jason from Ancient Greek mythology. The story begins with Jason as a young boy being raised by Centaurs, detailing the first of many quests that he must go on in order to prove himself worthy of take the throne.
10	The Lost Wizard	Michael Gray	TSR, Inc.	1984	Fantasy	Ivor Janci	Ben Otero	9780394727875
The reader, as Andru, has shrunk to the size of a fly and is on a quest to find the Lost Wizard.

== See also ==
- Choose Your Own Adventure
