= Creeks and Crawdads =

Tabletop role-playing game

Creeks and Crawdads is a role-playing game published by Crustacium Games in 1986.

== Description ==
Creeks and Crawdads is a fantasy system in which the player characters are intelligent mutant crawdads.

== Publication history ==
Creeks and Crawdads was designed by M. Martin Costa, and published by Crustacium Games in 1986 as a 24-page book.

One adventure was published for the game, Never Cry Crawdad (1987).

== Reception ==
Lawrence Schick comments that "The rules are completely unserious, the scenarios are ludicrous, and life in general is cheap. But who cares? They're only crawdads."
