= Realms of Horror =

D&D module

- Code: S1-4
- TSR product code: 9209
- Authors: Gary Gygax and Lawrence Schick with Wm. John Wheeler
- First published: 1987

Linked modules
- S1 S2 S3 S4

Realms of Horror is a "supermodule" compiled from the S–series of Dungeons & Dragons modules, which were four distinct Advanced Dungeons & Dragons 1st edition adventure modules, designed for use by Dungeon Masters as pre-made scenarios that are ready to be played with minimal preparation.

== Plot summary ==
Realms of Horror contains four adventure scenarios collected from previously published modules coded S1 through S4, which have been reformatted into a connected adventure campaign.

== Publication history ==
The "S," standing for "Special," in the series' name is the first part of the alphanumeric code used to indicate related modules. The four S–series modules were released over the four-year period between 1978 and 1982.

S1-4 Realms of Horror was written by Gary Gygax and Lawrence Schick with Wm. John Wheeler, with a cover by Larry Elmore, and was published by TSR in 1987 as an 80-page book, a 48-page art booklet, a 16-page map booklet, and an outer folder.

Module	Code	Authors	Release	Levels	Pages	ISBN	Dungeon ranking
Tomb of Horrors	S1	Gary Gygax	1978	10–14	32	ISBN 0-935696-12-1	3
White Plume Mountain	S2	Lawrence Schick	1979	5–10	16	ISBN 0-935696-13-X	9
Expedition to the Barrier Peaks	S3	Gary Gygax	1980	8–12	32	ISBN 0-935696-14-8	5
The Lost Caverns of Tsojcanth	S4	Gary Gygax	1982	6–10	64	ISBN 0-935696-72-5	22
Realms of Horror	S1–4	Gary Gygax and Lawrence Schick	1987	Various	144	ISBN 0-88038-486-7	N/A

== Reception ==
All four of the modules were in Dungeon's 2004 article, "The 30 Greatest D&D Adventures of All Time"

== See also ==
- List of Dungeons & Dragons modules
