= Tomb of Horrors =

Role-playing game adventure

- 1981 Tomb of Horrors cover reprint; art by Jeff Dee depicts adventurers battling a demi-lich
- Code: S1
- TSR product code: 9022
- Rules required: Advanced Dungeons & Dragons 1st edition
- Character levels: 10-14
- Campaign setting: Greyhawk
- Authors: Gary Gygax
- First published: 1978 (1975)
- ISBN: 0-935696-12-1

Linked modules
- S1 S2 S3 S4; Return to the Tomb of Horrors; Tomb of Annihilation

Tomb of Horrors is an adventure module written by Gary Gygax for the Dungeons & Dragons (D&D) role-playing game. It was originally written for and used at the 1975 Origins 1 convention. Gygax designed the adventure both to challenge the skill of expert players in his own campaign and to test players who boasted of having mighty player characters able to best any challenge. The module, coded S1, was the first in the S-series, or special series of modules. Several versions of the adventure have been published, the first in 1978, and the most recent, for the fifth edition of D&D, in 2017 as one of the included adventures in Tales from the Yawning Portal. The module also served as the basis for a novel published in 2002.

The module's plot revolves around the tomb of the demilich Acererak. The player characters must battle their way past a variety of monsters and traps, with the ultimate goal of destroying Acererak. Tomb of Horrors was considered the third greatest Dungeons & Dragons adventure of all time by the staff of Dungeon in 2004. The module has influenced later Dungeons & Dragons products, and was followed by three other (unrelated) modules in the S-series: S2 White Plume Mountain, S3 Expedition to the Barrier Peaks, and S4 The Lost Caverns of Tsojcanth.

== Plot summary ==
Tomb of Horrors takes place in the World of Greyhawk, a D&D campaign setting. In Tomb of Horrors, the player characters encounter many perilous tricks and traps while trying to get into the crypt of a wizard. As the scenario begins, the players are told that the evil wizard Acererak is said to linger in his ancient tomb in undead form. Originally a powerful lich, he has (unbeknownst to the players) become a demi-lich, a more powerful form of undead that has transcended the need for any physical body apart from its skull. Player characters must survive the deadly traps in the tomb and fight their way into the demi-lich's elaborately concealed inner sanctum to destroy him.

The module is divided into thirty-three encounters, beginning with two false entrances to the tomb, and ending with "The Crypt of Acererak the Demi-Lich". Example encounters are the "Huge Pit Filled with 200 Spikes" (section 20), or encounter 22, "The Cavern of Gold and Silver Mists": "The mists are silvery and shot through with delicate streamers of golden color. Vision extends only 6'. There is a dim aura of good if detected for. Those who step into the mist must save versus poison or become idiots until they can breathe the clean air above ground under the warm sun." The module ends with the destruction of Acererak without any postscript.

== Publication history ==
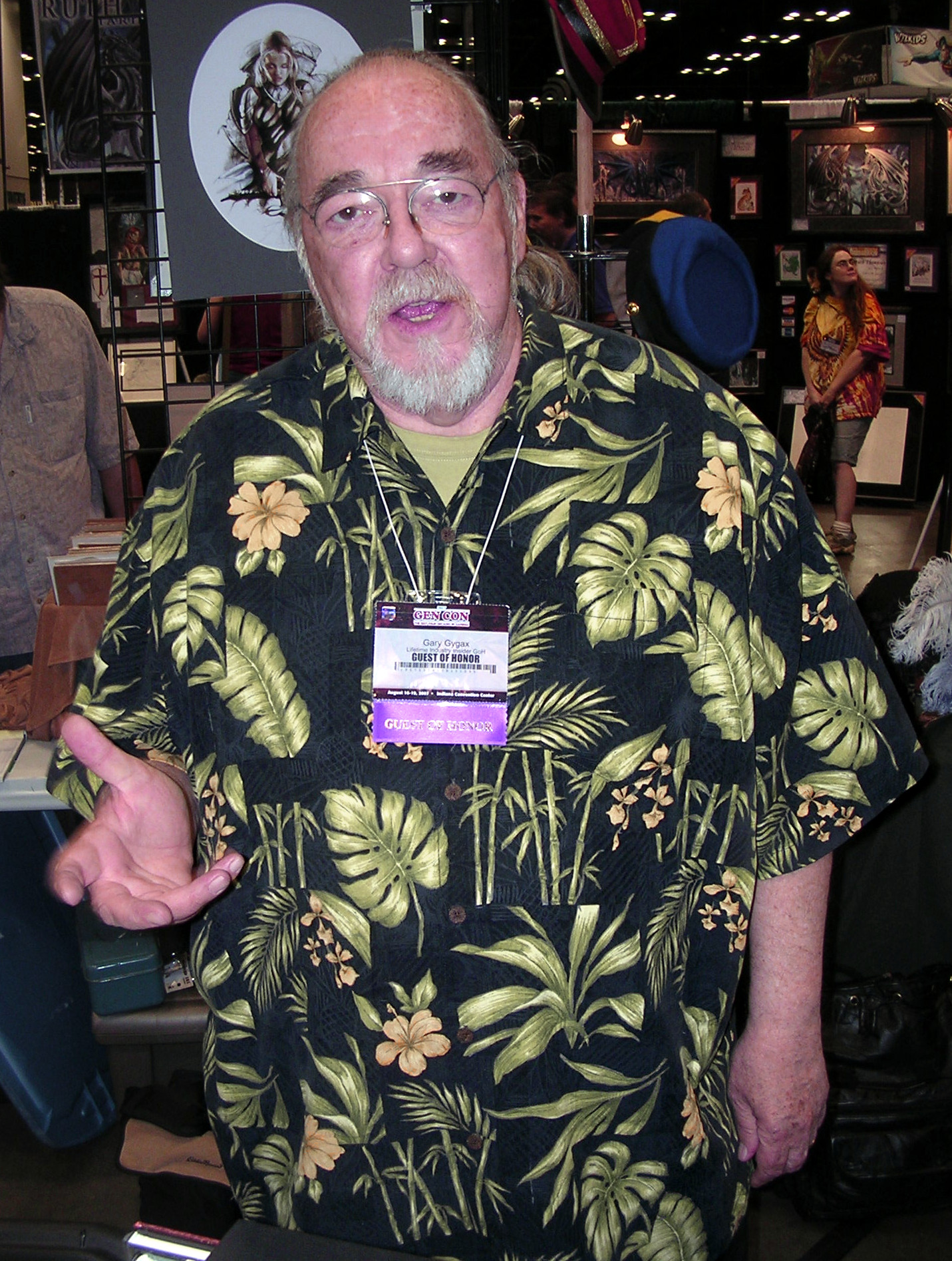
Author Gary Gygax in 2007 at the GenCon game convention

Tomb of Horrors was written by Gary Gygax for official D&D tournament play at the 1975 Origins 1 convention. Gygax developed the adventure from an idea by Alan Lucien, one of his original Advanced Dungeons & Dragons (AD&D) playtesters, "and I admit to chuckling evilly as I did so." Gygax designed the Tomb of Horrors modules for two related purposes. First, Gygax explains, "There were several very expert players in my campaign, and this was meant as yet another challenge to their skill—and the persistence of their theretofore-invincible characters. Specifically, I had in mind foiling Rob Kuntz's PC [player character], Robilar, and Ernie Gygax's PC, Tenser." Second, so that he was "ready for those fans [players] who boasted of having mighty PCs able to best any challenge offered by the AD&D game."

Tomb of Horrors was revised in late 1977 to be published as a module for Advanced Dungeons & Dragons. In 1978, TSR, Inc. published the module with a monochrome cover, revised and updated for use with first edition AD&D rules. The module included a twenty-page book, a twelve-page book, and an outer folder; the original printing featured a two-color cover. The module features a book of illustrations intended to be shown to the players as they progress in the adventure. Tomb of Horrors was republished in 1981 as a 32-page booklet with identical text but a new, full-color cover. The module has been described as the first adventure of a high-level scenario series, and was included as part of the Realms of Horror abridged compilation produced in 1987.

In 1998, the module was reprinted as part of the Return to the Tomb of Horrors module—a substantial expansion and sequel to the original adventure, written for 2nd Edition AD&D rules. Wizards of the Coast released an updated version of the original module as a free download for Halloween 2005, retaining much of the original content; the updated content is from the Dungeons & Dragons supplement book Libris Mortis. This updated version was designed for use with the Dungeons & Dragons 3.5 Edition rules. Tomb of Horrors was also adapted into a novel of the same name by Keith Francis Strohm for the Greyhawk Classics series published by Wizards of the Coast in 2002.

In July 2010, Wizards of the Coast released two adventures bearing the Tomb of Horrors name. One is a hardcover super-adventure written by Ari Marmell and Scott Fitzgerald Gray, which builds on and expands the legend of the original Tomb using the canon of Return to the Tomb of Horrors as a starting point. The second Tomb of Horrors is a conversion and update of the original module for 4th Edition rules, written by Scott Fitzgerald Gray and released to members of the RPGA as part of the DM Rewards program.

All four modules of the S-series were included as part of the Dungeons of Dread hardcover adventure collection, released on March 19, 2013. Lawrence Schick wrote in the foreword: "The dungeon of the demi-lich Acererak was, for Gary, a kind of thought experiment: If an undead sorcerer really wanted to keep his tomb from being plundered by greedy adventurers, how would he do it? The answer, of course, was to defend the crypt with tricks and traps designed not to challenge the intruders but to kill them dead. And furthermore, to do it in ways so horrific that all but the most determined party would give up and leave well enough alone."

In April 2013, Wizards published Tomb of Horrors in Dungeon Adventures issue 213. This version was revised to use the upcoming D&D Next rules, later renamed 5th Edition.

In 2017, Wizards re-released Tomb of Horrors updated to 5th Edition rules as part of the Tales from the Yawning Portal collection. The game design and the background of the third part of the Tomb of Annihilation campaign is based on the Tomb of Horrors.

A 2018 special edition of the book Art and Arcana contained a bonus pamphlet of the "original 1975 tournament module" previously unpublished.

As part of Extra Life 2019, Wizards of the Coast released Infernal Machine Rebuild, a time-hopping adventure that allows characters to travel back to the Tomb of Horrors during its construction.

== Reception ==
This is a D&D adventure created in 1978 for the purposes of testing the wit and fortitude of adventuring parties at game tournaments. "Testing" is used here in the same sense as the sentence "We'll be testing the dog for rabies." Let's just say the subject is not expected to survive the procedure.

— Lore Sjöberg of Wired on Tomb of Horrors

Tomb of Horrors was ranked the 3rd greatest Dungeons & Dragons adventure of all time by Dungeon magazine in 2004. Dungeon Master for Dummies lists Tomb of Horrors as one of the ten best classic adventures and posits that many of the adventure's traps would kill a character just for making poor choices. Lawrence Schick, in his 1991 book Heroic Worlds, calls the adventure "A very difficult scenario".

Don Turnbull reviewed Tomb of Horrors in issue No. 13 of the magazine White Dwarf and gave the module a rating of 10 out of 10. Turnbull commented on the adventure's difficulty, noting that the dungeon is "sprinkled extensively with subtle, insidious and carefully laid traps, and it will be a fortunate adventurer who manages to avoid them". He felt that the illustration booklet would add a great deal to the adventure's atmosphere and felt that the pre-generated character roster was useful. Turnbull noted that the module is "very hard and will be hard for the DM to learn in advance, though this is an essential prerequisite of running it properly for it is much more subtle than the G or D modules", and he said that this module has in common with those modules an "excellent format, for instance, and the comprehensive way in which the scenario is introduced. TSR's high quality has not been in any way compromised, and in S1 it has even been improved upon."

Wayne MacLaurin of SF Site describes the module as "a classic" and a "must have" for gamers, saying that when he played the game in high school, most of his group's characters quickly died. MacLaurin explains that Tomb of Horrors is a classic not because of its difficulty, but because it was the first module that did not involve killing large numbers of monsters; it was a "collection of puzzles and maps." Its focus on traps rather than monsters was a surprise to gamers at the time. One technique that some players used to get past the deathtraps was to drive cattle ahead of them, which Lore Sjöberg of Wired described as "a bit less than heroic", noting that in The Lord of the Rings, Gandalf did not send "50 head of cattle into the Mines of Moria to serve as Balrog bait." The authors of Dungeons and Dragons and Philosophy: Raiding the Temple of Wisdom commented that "One of the most famous D&D adventures, the Tomb of Horrors, has grown to have a legendary status amongst gamers [...] It has come to be known as a truly difficult adventure, and obtained enough of a cult following to induce some players to put 'I survived the Tomb of Horrors' bumper stickers on their cars." David M. Ewalt, in his book Of Dice and Men, discussed the adventure's reputation as "the deadliest game ever written", noting that it "unloads a series of complicated puzzles and nightmarish traps" on characters, concluding that "Few survive long enough to collect any treasure, and even fewer manage to find their way back through the deadly maze and escape with their spoils."

Something Awful presented a humorous article about the ways that Tomb of Horrors is the bane of gamers everywhere since it is basically a series of traps that kills off most of the characters. "One of the best (worst) things about this module is that Acererak the demi-lich is a huge asshole. He's an asshole for filling his tomb with traps AND treasure, he's an asshole because he leaves little messages throughout his tomb bragging about how he's going to kill the players."

TheGamer in 2022 ranked it as #6 on their list of "The Best 3.5 Edition Adventures".

== Legacy ==
Tomb of Horrors has also influenced later Dungeons & Dragons products. Jason Bulmahn used the module, as well as Indiana Jones, as inspiration for some of the traps in the 2007 D&D supplement Dungeonscape. The computer role-playing game Icewind Dale, developed by Black Isle Studios, was influenced by the module; Black Isle Studios division director Feargus Urquhart said, "We wanted something that reminded everyone of their first foray into dungeons like the Tomb of Horrors, with traps around every corner, and the undead crawling out of the walls."

Tomb of Horrors is key to the plot of the novel Ready Player One by Ernest Cline, which is set in a virtual reality world created by a man who was a fan of the module. The character James Halliday recreated the dungeon in detail, which the novel's other characters must traverse to advance in the global contest and win Halliday's fortune. In the Ready Player One film adaptation, the graffiti on the back of Aech's van is from Tomb of Horrors, shunning the copper key's original location for a reference-packed race for the key.
