= Return to the Temple of Elemental Evil =

Dungeons & Dragons adventure module

- Code: 11843
- Rules required: 3rd Edition D&D
- Character levels: 4 - 14
- Campaign setting: Greyhawk
- Authors: Monte Cook
- First published: 2001

Linked modules
- The Temple of Elemental Evil; Return to the Temple of Elemental Evil; Princes of the Apocalypse

Return to the Temple of Elemental Evil is an adventure module written by Monte Cook for the 3rd edition of the Dungeons & Dragons fantasy roleplaying game, set in the game's World of Greyhawk campaign setting. It was originally published by American game company Wizards of the Coast in 2001 as a sequel to the 1985 Advanced Dungeons & Dragons (AD&D) module, The Temple of Elemental Evil.

The plot of the module pits the player characters against the third iteration of the cult of the Elder Elemental Eye and the power of their Temple of Elemental Evil, first introduced in the original module. The events of Return to the Temple of Elemental Evil occur nine years after the previous module as the adventurers attempt to prevent cultists of Tharizdun from harnessing the power of four elemental nodes in order to release their god.

== Plot summary ==
The player characters must foil the plan of the cultists of Tharizdun who have again occupied the temple. The cultists are attempting to restore each of four elemental nodes and release the Princes of Elemental Evil to bring destruction and chaos to the surrounding area. By doing so, the Princes would weaken Tharizdun's bonds. To summon the Princes, Tharizdun's followers operate within the cult of the Elder Elemental Eye.

=== History of the temple ===
The temple was originally established 25 years prior to the events of the module by worshipers of the gods Lolth, Zuggtmoy, and Iuz. Cultists of Tharizdun manipulated them into constructing it over a source of great power intended to release Tharizdun. Zuggtmoy and Iuz then created the Orb of Golden Death, which could draw power through elemental nodes from the four elemental planes. Three years after construction, however, the temple was sacked for the first time by neighboring armies.

Nine years later, cultists of the Elder Elemental Eye occupied the temple again and began gathering an army, only to be overthrown once again by adventuring bands based out of the nearby town of Hommlet. This time, the adventurers destroyed the Orb of Golden Death, banished Zuggtmoy, and sealed the underground levels of the temple, cutting off access to the cult's elemental nodes.

=== The course of the adventure ===
At the module's beginning, the cult of Tharizdun has begun to gather force once more at a new temple called the Temple of All-Consumption. They aim to excavate the collapsed lower levels of the Temple of Elemental Evil in order to restore the elemental nodes that would release the Princes of Elemental Evil. Their activities have gone almost completely unnoticed by local leaders and military forces, so they have been operating unopposed.

The adventurers begin in the town of Hommlet, which near "the moathouse", an active excavation site where the cult is working to restore a shrine. Investigating the moathouse, along with discovering the presence of cult spies undercover in the town of Hommlet, gives them clues to visit the ruined, original temple in the nearby abandoned town of Nulb. These two encounters point the way to the Temple of All-Consumption, which is near the hamlet of Rastor. Investigation of this temple occurs in three increasingly difficult stages: the Crater Ridge Mines, the Outer Fane, and the Inner Fane. After reaching the interior of the Temple of All-Consumption, the adventurers return to the Temple of Elemental Evil, which by then has been fully restored by the cultists, to stop their final plans.

== Publication history ==
The module was published by Wizards of the Coast in 2001 for the 3rd edition Dungeons & Dragons rules as an updated, revised, and expanded sequel to the AD&D adventure The Temple of Elemental Evil. The publication was inspired by earlier revisions of other classic adventures by the company TSR, such as Return to White Plume Mountain and Return to the Keep on the Borderlands.

The book is 192 pages long, including four appendices. The main section consists of 3 parts and 8 chapters. Part one covers the town and Hommlet and the surrounding landscape, including the Temple of Elemental Evil while still in a state of disrepair. Part two details the Temple of All-Consumption, including the hamlet of Rastor, Crater Ridge mines, and the inner temple. The third part revolves around the final stages of the cult's plans, set in the Temple of Elemental Evil after the cult restores it, and the fire node where they are attempting to summon an elemental prince.

Appendix 1 provides the details of magic items and monsters specific to the adventure. Appendix 2 fleshes out the abilities and effects of Tharizdun's followers. Appendix 3 provides the details of the adventure's non-player characters, and appendix four consists of documents the adventurers will discover during the game, which provide information about the cult's intentions.

=== Expanded lore ===
The original Temple of Elemental Evil module was centered around the gods Zuggtmoy and Iuz, and there was some confusion over their connection to the powers of elemental evil. In order to explain their origins, Monte Cook re-centered the cult around Tharizdun, who was originally created by Gary Gygax in The Forgotten Temple of Tharizdun. Cook's sequel tied the newly introduced god to the gods of the Temple of Elemental Evil by making the Elder Elemental Eye from that module an aspect of Tharizdun. This revelation was inspired by Gygax's original notes on the prequel, which originally included the Elder Elemental Eye as a secret force behind Zuggtmoy's power. Additionally, Cook included the Prince of Evil Fire Elementals, Imix, as another tie to elemental sources of power.

=== Production credits ===
Role	
Author	Monte Cook
Editors	Jennifer Clarke Wilkes, Andy Collins, & Duane Maxwell
Cover illustration	Brom
Interior illustration	David Roach
Cartography	Todd Gamble

== Reception ==
Reviewer Alan Kohler stated that "the material is well written and consistent with the D&D rules" but that he doesn't consider this to be Monte Cook's best adventure. The three main concerns he cites are the possibility that the extensive dungeon-crawling the adventure requires might become tedious for players, that the adventure does a poor job of providing reasons that the characters should care about defeating the cult, and that advancing in the plot depends on the party finding a few, easily overlooked, clues. He does, however, praise the expanded material the book includes, saying that it is "an immense adventure with tons of usable material".

Product historian Kevin Kulp also praises the amount of included material, along with the adventure's "epic and nefarious" scope. While he finds the encounters to be well-designed, he recommends removing some during play to avoid a "combat slog" style of game.

Matthew Pook, in his review, stated that one problem with the adventure "may be in getting the party to the starting point ... to begin the campaign". He stated that the adventure "is a large and detailed dungeon bash" and it "resemble[s] the onionskin model exemplified by many of Chaosium's Call of Cthulhu campaign packs".

In her book, The Creation of Narrative in Tabletop Role-Playing Games, Jennifer Grouling Cover cites both the original Temple of Elemental Evil module, along with Return to the Temple of Elemental Evil, as an example of how setting and narrative may change between different medias and publications.

Return to the Temple of Elemental Evil was ranked the 8th greatest Dungeons & Dragons adventure of all time by Dungeon magazine in 2004, on the 30th anniversary of the Dungeons & Dragons game.

Dungeon Master for Dummies lists Return to the Temple of Elemental Evil as one of the ten best 3rd edition adventures.

== Reviews ==
- Backstab #33
- Backstab #43 (as "Retour au temple du Mal élémentaire")
- Realms of Fantasy
