= Never Cry Crawdad =

Never Cry Crawdad is a 1987 role-playing game adventure published by Crustacium Games for Creeks and Crawdads.

== Plot summary ==
Never Cry Crawdad is an adventure in which dungeon crawls are parodied with absurd elements, including radioactive Gooey Egg Ooze and the Zombie Crawdads from Hell. To streamline gameplay, the module includes pregenerated player characters.

== Publication history ==
Never Cry Crawdad was written by Jim Van Over and published by Crustacium Games in 1987 as a 20-page book.

== Reception ==
Lawrence Schick commented that providing the pregenerated PCs "saves each player about 90 seconds".
