= Above and Beyond =

Above and Beyond may refer to:

== Film ==
- Above and Beyond (1952 film), about World War II American pilot Paul Tibbets and the atomic bombing of Hiroshima
- Above and Beyond (2014 film), about World War II veteran pilots who defended the nascent state of Israel in 1948

== Music ==
- Above & Beyond (band), an English trance music group formed in 2000
- Above & Beyond (album), a 1999 live album by jazz musician Freddie Hubbard
- "Above and Beyond" (song), a 1960 country music song written by Harlan Howard

== Other ==
- Above and Beyond (miniseries), a 2006 Canadian mini series about World War II Atlantic ferry operations
- above&beyond (magazine), a Canadian magazine
- Above & Beyond Children's Museum, Sheboygan, Wisconsin
- Above and Beyond Party, UK political party established in 2015
- Above and Beyond: The Encyclopedia of Aviation and Space Sciences, a 14 volume encyclopedia

== See also ==
- Space: Above and Beyond, 1990s science-fiction television series
- Above and Beyoncé: Video Collection & Dance Mixes, a remix and video album by R&B singer Beyoncé Knowles
- Medal of Honor: Above and Beyond, a 2020 video game
