= Toee =

Toee may refer to:

- a mancala game
- An acronym for The Temple of Elemental Evil
