= World Action And Adventure =

Modern-world tabletop role-playing game

World Action and Adventure is a modern-world role-playing game published by M.S. Kinney Corporation in 1985 that attempts to simulate the actual world we live in.

== Description ==
World Action and Adventure is a universal role-playing system, with character creation, skill, combat, and mass combat rules. The boxed set includes the Official Guide, a GM's screen, character record sheets, and blank forms. In its attempt to simulate the actual modern world, the game tries to quantify everything in the modern world, including life expectancies, animals, careers, and diseases. RPG historian Stu Horvath notes "minimum hours of sleep, a matrix for determining the outcome of a trial ... A set of tables for important events in a character's year includes a sub-table for embarrassment — at a party, with a friend, many people around, hundreds watching."

== Publication history ==
World Action and Adventure was designed by Gregory L. Kinney as a college project that earned him five course credits. It was play-tested by friends and relatives including his grandparents, and published by the M.S. Kinney Corporation in 1985 as a boxed set containing a 160-page hardcover book, a cardstock screen, a packet of blank forms, a small pad of character sheets, and dice. Several supplements were published the same year including Book of Animals and Geography (1985) and Actor's Book of Characters. Ads that appeared in games magazines that year offered a reward of $50 to the first 100 players who sent in the description of a scenario that had been designed and played by at least four players using at least ten tables or charts during play. The Official Guide from the main set was also published separately in 1985.

== Reception ==
In his 1991 book Heroic Worlds, Lawrence Schick commented "WA&A is beyond doubt the nicest RPG ever published. The three books attempt to describe everything on Earth from a staggeringly naive worldview. The rulebooks consist of a multitude of very general tables that list everything the author could think of. The descriptions that accompany the tables are so ingenuous, they're just priceless. Then there's the poem, "World Action and Adventure": 20 verses, each describing a different aspect of adventure. An excerpt: 'Pyramids are being built/the Pharaoh has a suppressed guilt/so many slaves they thirst and die/to build these things that touch the sky" ... it just goes on and on."

In his 2023 book Monsters, Aliens, and Holes in the Ground, RPG historian Stu Horvath noted, "Everything about this RPG is startling — its naivete, its scope, its production values, its scope, its production values [sic], its ambivalence to playability, its poetry." Horvath concluded, "Even if it comes off as an oddity 35-years later, it's an admirable artifact."
