= World Action and Adventure Official Guide =

Official Guide is a 1985 role-playing game supplement published by M.S. Kinney Corporation for World Action And Adventure.

== Contents ==
Official Guide is a supplement in which the rulebook treats players as "actors," assigns them quirky self‑identity categories, and even grades and ranks them after each session, all alongside standard rules for combat, encounters, and copious tables.

== Publication history ==
Official Guide was written by Gregory L. Kinney and published by M.S. Kinney Corporation in 1985 as a hardbound 160-page book. The Official Guide was the core rulebook included in the boxed set, which could also be purchased on its own.

== Reception ==
Lawrence Schick commented that "The players [...] must decide whether to play a 'Full-Self' (you as your character), 'New-Self' (Full-Self with slight changes), 'Moral-Self' (character can be completely different from player, except morally), 'Physical-Self' (character can be completely different from player, except physically), or 'Non-Self' (player actually created a completely different character!). Got that? After each session, the GM actually grades each player, then ranks them on the 'actor ladder' in order of grade! As the author points out, 'Actors can be encouraged or discouraged by the ladder, but this gives them a good indication of where they stand. It is also fun competition!'"
