= World Action and Adventure Book of Animals & Geography =

Book of Animals & Geography is a 1985 role-playing game supplement published by M.S. Kinney Corporation for World Action And Adventure.

== Contents ==
Book of Animals & Geography is a supplement in which animals are detailed and cataloged in numerous tables.

== Publication history ==
Book of Animals and Geography was written by Gregory L. Kinney and published by M.S. Kinney Corporation in 1985 as a hardbound 128-page book.

== Reception ==
Lawrence Schick commented that "According to the author, the animal-classification system is 'Ambiguous yes, but confusing no.' Even the animals in this game are nice: tuataras, unlovely reptiles that emit loud croaks, are described as having their 'own brand of music and enjoy human choruses. They are musical themselves, so these quaint, lovable living fossils and humankind can make music together.' Touching, no? The black bear is the 'clown of the woods,' and the boomslang, one of the world's most venomous serpents, is a 'Tropical Non-Poisonous Snake.' Favorite quote: 'Dangerous animals can often bring exciting moments.'"
