= World Action and Adventure: Actor's Book of Characters =

1985 role-playing game supplement

Actor's Book of Characters is a 1985 role-playing game supplement published by M.S. Kinney Corporation for World Action And Adventure.

== Contents ==
Actor's Book of Characters is a supplement in which professions are cataloged across two grand eras, offering eclectic character choices.

== Publication history ==
Actor's Book of Characters was written by Gregory L. Kinney and published by M.S. Kinney Corporation in 1985 as a hardbound 96-page book.

== Reception ==
Lawrence Schick declared, "This is full of great stuff. We learn that all of human history can be divided into the "Early Era" and the "Modern Era". Early Era occupations include the Cowboys, who could be found in the Midwest, Texas, and Europe (“European cowboys herded cattle in France, England, and the Ukraine”). That just a fine sample of the fine character options this game presents."
