= Advanced Dungeons & Dragons Adventure Gamebooks =

1985–1988 gamebook series

Prisoners of Pax Tharkas

Advanced Dungeons & Dragons Adventure Gamebook is a series of 18 gamebooks published from 1985 to 1988. The series was initially titled Super Endless Quest Adventure Gamebook as the books added a more complex game system to stories which otherwise share the same style with the Endless Quest books. On the third book the series' title changed to Advanced Dungeons & Dragons Super Endless Quest Adventure Gamebook and it finally became Advanced Dungeons & Dragons Adventure Gamebook from the fourth book onwards.

== Books in the series ==
#	Title	Setting	Author	Published	Cover by	Interior Art by	ISBN	Ref
1	Prisoners of Pax Tharkas	Dragonlance	Morris Simon	1985-02	Keith Parkinson	Mark Nelson	ISBN 0-88038-209-0	→
2	The Ghost Tower	Greyhawk	Jean Blashfield	1985-05	Keith Parkinson	Larry Day	ISBN 0-88038-215-5	→
3	Escape from Castle Quarras	Generic D&D	Douglas Niles	1985-06	Jeff Easley	Mark Nelson	ISBN 0-88038-252-X	→
4	The Soulforge	Dragonlance	Terry Phillips	1985-09	Keith Parkinson	Mark Nelson	ISBN 0-88038-254-6	→
5	Test of the Ninja	13th Century Japan	Curtis Smith	1985-11	Clyde Caldwell	Gary Williams	ISBN 0-88038-260-0	→
6	Master of Ravenloft	AD&D Ravenloft	Jean Blashfield	1986-01	Clyde Caldwell	Gary Williams	ISBN 0-88038-261-9	→
7	Sceptre of Power	Kingdom of Sorcery Trilogy, vol 1	Morris Simon	1986-03	Keith Parkinson	George Barr	ISBN 0-88038-285-6	→
8	Nightmare Realm of Baba Yaga	Generic D&D	Roger E. Moore	1986-05	Jeff Easley	Mark Nelson	ISBN 0-88038-286-4	→
9	The Sorcerer's Crown	Kingdom of Sorcery Trilogy, vol 2	Morris Simon	1986-07	Clyde Caldwell	George Barr	ISBN 0-88038-308-9	→
10	Lords of Doom	Dragonlance	Douglas Niles	1986-09	Larry Elmore	Diana Magnuson	ISBN 0-88038-309-7	→
11	Clash of the Sorcerers	Kingdom of Sorcery Trilogy, vol 3	Morris Simon	1986-11	Keith Parkinson	George Barr	ISBN 0-88038-310-0	→
12	Curse of the Werewolf	Generic D&D	Chris Martindale	1987-02	Tim Hildebrandt	Stephen (Steve) Fabian	ISBN 0-88038-432-8	→
13	Gates of Death	Generic D&D	Terry Phillips	1987-05	Carl Lundgren	Jan Duursema	ISBN 0-88038-433-6	→
14	Trail Sinister	Generic D&D	James Brumbaugh	1987-08	Jeff Easley	George Barr	ISBN 0-88038-453-0	→
15	The Vanishing City	Mystara, based on module M4: Five Coins for a Kingdom	Allen Varney	1987-11	Clyde Caldwell	Doug Chaffee	ISBN 0-88038-434-4	→
16	Shadow over Nordmaar	Dragonlance	Dezra Despain	1988-02	Clyde Caldwell	Mark Nelson	ISBN 0-88038-541-3	→
17	Spawn of Dragonspear	Forgotten Realms	Steve Perrin	1988-05	Keith Parkinson	Douglas Ball	ISBN 0-88038-570-7	→
18	Prince of Thieves	Generic D&D	Chris Martindale	1988-08	Jeff Easley	Chris Miller	ISBN 0-88038-596-0	→
