= The Forgotten Temple of Tharizdun =

Dungeons & Dragons adventure module

- Code: WG4
- TSR product code: 9065
- Rules required: 1st Ed AD&D
- Character levels: 5 - 10
- Campaign setting: Greyhawk
- Authors: Gary Gygax
- First published: 1982

Linked modules
- S4 WG4

The Forgotten Temple of Tharizdun is an adventure module for the Dungeons & Dragons (D&D) role-playing game, for use in the World of Greyhawk campaign setting. The module was published by TSR, Inc. in 1982 for the first edition Advanced Dungeons & Dragons rules.

== Plot summary ==
The Forgotten Temple of Tharizdun is an adventure that takes place in the World of Greyhawk. This adventure starts with an incident from The Lost Caverns of Tsojcanth. The player characters (PCs) discover the temple while trailing a gang of norkers from the caverns. The PCs search hazardous mountain passes to find the lair of the monsters inside the temple. The adventurers are drawn into the story by a gnomish community and travel to the temple. After battling their way in, the PCs explore the temple chambers, which contain mundane creatures and new monsters from the Fiend Folio supplement.

During their exploration, the characters may reach chambers of the temple in which religious rituals were performed, and risk insanity and death as they encounter remnants of worshipers of the imprisoned god Tharizdun. To progress further, the characters must enact portions of the rituals of worship of Tharizdun, traveling into an underground sub-temple, and magically opening an inner sanctum called the Black Cyst. Having advanced this far, the characters are likely to be driven insane, killed outright, or permanently trapped within the underground temple.

== Publication history ==
The Forgotten Temple of Tharizdun was written by Gary Gygax and published by TSR in 1982 as a 32-page booklet with two outer folders. It was given the code WG4 (World of Greyhawk #4), although adventures WG1, WG2 and WG3 did not exist. (The Village of Hommlet and its sequel Temple of Elemental Evil were originally to be given the codes WG1 and WG2, but instead were designated T1 and T2. Likewise Lost Caverns of Tsojcanth was originally designated WG3, but eventually was published as S4.) Gygax wanted to produce the adventure quickly, and to save time used freelance artist Karen Nelson to produce the module's art rather than waiting for TSR's design department. The adventure is a loosely connected sequel to module S4 Lost Caverns of Tsojcanth, and can be used with or without it. It is a combined wilderness and dungeon adventure set in the Southern Yatil Mountains, focused on a temple dedicated to the evil and insane Greyhawk god Tharizdun. A future work was promised to develop the plot from this adventure further, but was never published.

== Theme ==
The thematic elements of nightmare and insanity bring Lovecraftian horror to Dungeons & Dragons, and not for the first time. The concept of a trapped, malevolent god, intent upon the destruction of all that is, harkens to the dark and insane Great Old Ones of H.P. Lovecraft's fiction. In his comprehensive article on the topic of Lovecraftian influence on D&D, "The Shadow Over D&D", James Jacobs says of The Forgotten Temple of Tharizdun and Return to the Temple of Elemental Evil, "Tharizdun[...] obviously owes his pedigree to Lovecraft."

== Reception ==
Jim Bambra reviewed The Forgotten Temple of Tharizdun for White Dwarf, and gave it 9 out of 10 overall. Bambra noted that "The Temple is brought to life excellently and contains plenty for players to think about, gaining entry requires good tactical play and an imaginative approach is needed to fathom out the Temple's hidden secrets."

Lawrence Schick, in his 1991 book Heroic Worlds, criticized the module's cover as "the worst cover of any TSR AD&D module, a morass of colored blobs."

The Forgotten Temple of Tharizdun was ranked the 23rd greatest Dungeons & Dragons adventure of all time by Dungeon magazine in 2004.

== Other recognition ==
A copy of The Forgotten Temple of Tharizdun is held in the collection of the Strong National Museum of Play (object 110.1944).
