= The Tomb of Horrors (novel) =

2002 novel by Keith Strohm

- Author: Keith Strohm
- Language: English
- Genre: Fantasy novel
- Publication date: February 2002
- Publication place: United States
- Media type: Print
- ISBN: 9780786927029

The Tomb of Horrors is a 2002 fantasy novel by Keith Strohm, set in the world of Greyhawk, and based on the Dungeons & Dragons role-playing game, specifically the adventure S1 Tomb of Horrors.

== Plot summary ==
Kaerion, a fallen paladin, is recruited by a group of adventurers to help them explore the legendary Tomb of Horrors. In addition to confronting the tomb's architect, the evil demilich Acererak, the party also finds themselves opposed by a group of evil adventurers.

== Development ==
In 1999, order to recognize the 25th anniversary of Dungeons & Dragons, Wizards of the Coast published the "Greyhawk Classics", a series of seven novels based on well-known D&D adventures published by TSR during the first decade of the game: Against the Giants (1999), White Plume Mountain (1999), Descent into the Depths of the Earth (2000), The Temple of Elemental Evil (2001), Queen of the Demonweb Pits (2001), Keep on the Borderlands (2001), and finally, The Tomb of Horrors (2002), a 310-page paperback written Keith Francis Strohm and published in 2002.

== Reception ==
Tomb of Horrors appeared on the 2024 Game Rant "31 Best Dungeons & Dragons Novels, Ranked" list at #30.

== Reviews ==
- Review by Don D'Ammassa (2002) in Science Fiction Chronicle, #224 May 2002
