= Faerie Mound of Dragonkind =

1987 gamebook

Faerie Mound of Dragonkind is a 1987 gamebook published by TSR.

== Contents ==
Faerie Mound of Dragonkind is a gamebook in which a maze solo quest has around 1,500 paragraphs. Aimed at younger players, it offers two character options that shape the quest through the lands of Faerie, with simple combat and minimal roleplaying. The journey involves progressing from the King's realm to the Queen's, with mechanics including a wandering NPC and detailed illustrations for each location that allow item inspection.

== Publication history ==
Faeriemound of Dragonkind was written by Jean Blashfield and James M. Ward and was published by TSR in 1987 as a 160-page book.

== Reception ==
James Wallis reviewed Catacombs: Faerie Mound of Dragonkind for Adventurer magazine and stated that "the adventure is good, the whole thing well-constructed and generally enjoyable. I hesitate to recommend it, though... I suggest that you give it to a younger sibling for their birthday, and then pinch it a week later."

== Reviews ==
- Asimov's SF Magazine
