= Linda Lowery =

American author and illustrator

- Education: DePaul University
- Occupations: Author; illustrator

Linda Lowery is an American author and illustrator.

== Education ==
Lowery graduated from DePaul University where she earned a degree in French.

== Works ==
Linda Lowery wrote the Endless Quest gamebook Spell of the Winter Wizard in 1983, and the HeartQuest gamebooks Secret Sorceress and Moon Dragon Summer for TSR.

She also writes and illustrates children's books. Her titles include Hannah and the Angels: Mission Down Under (1998), Trick or Treat, It's Halloween! (2000), Who Wants a Valentine? (2002), One More Valley, One More Hill: The Story of Aunt Clara Brown (2003), and Day of the Dead (2003).
