= The Emerald Scepter =

2005 novel by Thomas M. Reid

- First edition
- Author: Thomas M. Reid
- Cover artist: Duane O. Myers
- Language: English
- Genre: Fantasy novel
- Published: Wizards of the Coast 2005
- Publication place: United States
- Media type: Print (Paperback)
- Pages: 309
- ISBN: 0-7869-3754-8
- Preceded by: The Ruby Guardian

The Emerald Scepter is a fantasy novel by Thomas M. Reid, set in the world of the Forgotten Realms, and based on the Dungeons & Dragons role-playing game. It is the third novel in "The Scions of Arrabar" trilogy. It was published in paperback in August 2005 (ISBN 978-0-7869-3754-7).

== Plot summary ==
An ally from the deepest forests comes to aid a city involved in the political intrigue of a mercenary society.

== Reception ==
Don D'Ammassa opined that the novel's plot is the "most interesting" of the three in the trilogy, "although the prose is occasionally awkward."
