= The Temple of Elemental Evil =

Dungeons & Dragons adventure module

- The cover of The Temple of Elemental Evil, with art by Keith Parkinson. The artwork depicts the Temple during a storm, surrounded by gargoyles.
- Code: T1–4
- TSR product code: 9147
- Rules required: 1st Ed AD&D
- Character levels: 1–8
- Campaign setting: Greyhawk
- Authors: Gary Gygax and Frank Mentzer
- First published: 1985

Linked modules
- T1–4 A1–4 GDQ1–7; Return to the Temple of Elemental Evil

The Temple of Elemental Evil is an adventure module for the fantasy role-playing game Dungeons & Dragons, set in the game's World of Greyhawk campaign setting. The module was published by TSR, Inc. in 1985 for the first edition Advanced Dungeons & Dragons rules. It was written by Gary Gygax and Frank Mentzer, and is an expansion of an earlier Gygax module, The Village of Hommlet (TSR, 1979). The Temple of Elemental Evil is also the title of a related 2001 Thomas M. Reid novel and an Atari computer game.

The Temple of Elemental Evil was ranked the 4th greatest Dungeons & Dragons adventure of all time by Dungeon magazine in 2004, on the 30th anniversary of the Dungeons & Dragons game.

== Plot summary ==
In the module T1 The Village of Hommlet, the player characters must defeat the raiders operating out of a ruined fort nearby, and thereafter the characters can use Hommlet as a base for their adventures. The adventure begins in the village of Hommlet, situated near the site of a past battle against evil forces operating from the Temple. The adventurers travel through Hommlet and are drawn into a web of conspiracy and deception.

The module is intended for first-level characters, who begin the adventure "weary, weak, and practically void of money". They travel to a town with a reputation as having a great opportunity to earn fortunes and to defeat enemy creatures, but also to lose one's life. While the town initially appears hospitable, the characters soon learn that many of its inhabitants are powerful spies for minions of evil.

The T1 adventure stands alone, but also forms the first part of T1–4. In The Temple of Elemental Evil, the characters begin at a low level, and after establishing themselves in Hommlet, they explore the vast dungeons beneath the Temple, thereby earning experience. T1 culminates in a ruined moathouse where agents secretly plan to re-enter the Temple and free the demoness Zuggtmoy, imprisoned therein. The Village of Hommlet module has been described as a beginner's scenario, which starts in the village, and leads to a nearby dungeon, while The Temple of Elemental Evil continues the adventure. In the next section, T2, the adventurers move on to the nearby village of Nulb to confront several nefarious opponents, including agents from the Temple. Based on the outcome of these encounters, the player characters can then enter the Temple itself to interact with its many denizens and test their mettle against Zuggtmoy herself.

=== History of the temple ===
The temple referenced in the module's title is an unholy structure located in the central Flanaess not far from the city-state of Verbobonc. In 566 CY, forces of evil from Dyvers or the Wild Coast constructed a small chapel outside the nearby village of Nulb. The chapel was quickly built into a stone temple from which bandits and evil humanoids began to operate with increasing frequency.

In 569 CY, a combined force was sent to destroy the Temple and put an end to the marauding. This allied army clashed with a horde of evil men and humanoids, including orcs, ogres and gnolls, at the Battle of Emridy Meadows. Men-at-arms from Furyondy and Veluna united with dwarves from the Lortmils, gnomes from the Kron Hills, and an army of elven archers to face the threat of the Horde of Elemental Evil, consisting largely of savage humanoids such as orcs, ogres, and gnolls. The arrival of the elves from the shadows of the Gnarley Forest turned the tide of battle, trapping the savage humanoids against a bend in the Velverdyva where they were routed and slaughtered.

At some point in this battle, Serten, cleric of Saint Cuthbert and member of the Citadel of Eight, was slain. The Citadel was notable for its absence at this pivotal moment in the history of the Flanaess, and their failure to take part in the Battle of Emridy Meadows contributed to the group's decline and eventual disbandment.

After dispersing the Horde of Elemental Evil, the allied forces laid siege to the Temple of Elemental Evil itself, defeating it within a fortnight. Spellcasters loyal to the goodly army cooperated on a spell of sealing that bound the demoness Zuggtmoy (a major instigator in the Horde of Elemental Evil) to some of the deepest chambers in the castle's dungeons.

The site itself remained, however, and over the following decade rumors of evil presence there persisted. The Viscount of Verbobonc and the Archcleric of Veluna became increasingly concerned, and cooperated to build a small castle outside the Village of Hommlet to guard against the possibility of the Temple rising again.

For the next five years, Hommlet gained in wealth thanks to adventurers who came to the area seeking out remnants of evil to slay. Things quieted down for another four years as the area returned to peace and normalcy, but in 578 CY evil began to stir again, with groups of bandits riding the roads. In 579 CY, the events in the T1–4 module occur.

Return to the Temple of Elemental Evil is set 12 years later, in 591 CY.

== Publication history ==
The adventure module The Village of Hommlet was a 24-page booklet designed by Gary Gygax, and published by TSR in 1979. The original printing featured an outer folder and a two-color cover; the book was reprinted in 1981 with a color cover. The Temple of Elemental Evil was originally intended to bear the module code T2 and serve as a true sequel to The Village of Hommlet. Gygax began writing T2 soon after the publication of T1, but often stopped to work on other products, such as The Lost Caverns of Tsojcanth (Gygax 1981). The T2 version was never completed, and no module bearing the codes T3 or T4 was ever independently published. Instead, the material for the sequel was combined in 1985 with the original T1 storyline and published as an integrated adventure bearing the module code T1-4.

The original printings of T1 featured monochrome cover art by David A. Trampier, who also contributed interior art along with David C. Sutherland III. The 1981 and subsequent printings of T1 featured a new color cover painting by Jeff Dee surrounded by a lime green border. The expanded T1-4 book from 1985 features cover art by Keith Parkinson and interior art by Jeff Butler, Clyde Caldwell, Jeff Easley, Larry Elmore, Parkinson, and Trampier.

T1-4 The Temple of Elemental Evil was written by Gary Gygax with Frank Mentzer, and published by TSR in 1985, incorporating T1 The Village of Hommlet. Gygax gave his notes for The Temple to Frank Mentzer who used them to design T1-4, The Temple of Elemental Evil, which was released in 1985. The module was a 128-page book with a 16-page map booklet, and featured a cover by Keith Parkinson and interior illustrations by Jeff Butler, Clyde Caldwell, Jeff Easley, Larry Elmore, and Dave Trampier. The module includes descriptions of two towns, the Temple itself, and four large dungeon levels.

Although initially written as a stand-alone series, T1-4 was made to dovetail into A1-4 Scourge of the Slave Lords when these two campaigns were revised in 1986 as supermodules. The combined campaign then culminates with the GDQ series, incorporating modules G1-G3 Against the Giants; D1-D3, which introduced D&D fans to drow elves for the first time; and finally Q1, Queen of the Demonweb Pits, in which the heroes fight against the spider demon Lolth herself. These last adventures were also combined and republished as a supermodule bearing the code GDQ1-7, Queen of the Spiders.

In 2001, Wizards of the Coast published a novel by Thomas M. Reid also bearing the title The Temple of Elemental Evil.

Wizards of the Coast also published a sequel to the T1-4 adventure in 2001, the 3rd Edition module Return to the Temple of Elemental Evil.

In March, 2013Wizards of the Coast published a remake of The Village of Hommlet adventure for Dungeons & Dragons 4th Edition in Dungeon issue 212.

The original TSR product code for module T1 (bluetone and full color cover) is 9026.

== Reception ==
Kirby T. Griffis reviewed The Village of Hommlet in 1981, in The Space Gamer #35. Griffis found it a very playable module, noting that the module could be very fun if run by a good DM. Griffis commented: "Players 'get into' their roles, the thieves stealing from the revellers at the inn, the fighters getting drunk under the table." He also found the map to be well-keyed, and noted that important buildings have floor plans mapped out. Commenting on the imbalance of power, he noted that "some of the evil spies are entirely too powerful for the party to tackle, and the local high level good characters are hardly ever interested in aiding the adventurers." Overall, Griffis found The Village of Hommlet to be a very good introductory adventure, and recommended it as an introduction to D&D.

In a retrospective review of The Village of Hommlet in Black Gate, Bob Byrne said "Gygax packs in a TON of information into this module. Hommlet is brought to life and the Moathouse is ready to run. And with the history, there's room for growth (The Temple). So, it's ready to go 'off the shelf.' But there's also space for the GM to create as well. If the players want to mix in role play, the GM has a lot to work with. You could run quite a few sessions without any adventuring at all."

=== Legacy ===
The Temple of Elemental Evil was ranked the 4th greatest Dungeons & Dragons adventure of all time by Dungeon magazine in 2004, on the 30th anniversary of the Dungeons & Dragons game.

Dungeon Master for Dummies listed The Temple of Elemental Evil as one of the ten best classic adventures, calling it "the grandfather of all huge dungeon crawls".

Lawrence Schick, in his 1991 book Heroic Worlds, says of The Temple of Elemental Evil, "If you like huge classic dungeon crawls, this is probably the best of the lot."

John ONeill for Black Gate, said "The Temple of Elemental Evil may be Gary Gygax's crowning achievement as a dungeon designer. It was the last major adventure he designed for TSR and — at 128 pages — was by far the largest and most ambitious." Commenting on The Village of Hommlet in Black Gate, James Maliszewski said "I consider the 'incomplete' nature of The Village of Hommlet to be a positive thing that inadvertently encouraged me to spread my wings as a fledgling referee. Far from stifling my creativity, this module fostered it." Scott Taylor for Black Gate commented that "Although expertly covered by artist Keith Parkinson, the remainder of The Temple of Elemental Evil veritably screams that it was birthed in a maelstrom of financial panic and leadership void."

Scott Taylor of Black Gate in 2015 rated Temple of Elemental Evil as #3 in "The Top 10 Campaign Adventure Module Series of All Time, saying "I can attest that it is truly one of the greatest campaigns you can take players on, period."

== Reviews ==
- The V.I.P. of Gaming Magazine #4 (1986)
- Jeux et Stratégie #55

== In other media ==
=== Computer games ===
In 2003 a computer game, The Temple of Elemental Evil, based on the original T1-4 module was released. It was developed by Troika Games and published by Atari. It remains the only D&D related computer game set in the original Greyhawk setting.

In an update to the game, Dungeons & Dragons Online has made an in-game version of the adventure. In the same month that DDO's update went live, the online D&D game Neverwinter also released an in-game version of the Temple of Elemental Evil.

=== Board games ===
Wizards of the Coast published the Temple of Elemental Evil Board Game in 2015.

=== Album cover ===
The cover of Burzum's self-titled debut album was adapted from the adventure's cover art.
