= Quests from the Infinite Staircase =

Role-playing game adventure

- Rules required: Dungeons & Dragons, 5th edition
- First published: 2024
- ISBN: 9780786969494

Quests from the Infinite Staircase is an adventure module anthology for the 5th edition of the Dungeons & Dragons fantasy role-playing game.

== Summary ==
Quests from the Infinite Staircase is an anthology of modules and adventures from previous editions, modified to use fifth edition rules.

The adventures included, in order of presentation with original publication year, are:

- The Lost City (1982)
- When a Star Falls (1984)
- Beyond the Crystal Cave (1983)
- Pharaoh (1982)
- The Lost Caverns of Tsojcanth (1982)
- Expedition to the Barrier Peaks (1980)

== Publication history ==
Quests from the Infinite Staircase was released on July 16, 2024.

== Reception ==
A review for Screen Rant noted the modular structure of the adventures and their futuristic tone. The adventures are described as short and suited for dungeon crawling. The review praised the art work but ranked the anthology below Keys from the Golden Vault.

A review for Wargamer similarly described the adventures as "vintage 1980s dungeon crawls" heavy on combat, however it also noted that the modifications improved balance and storytelling. It notes that Beyond the Crystal Cave can be completed without combat. The reviewer states that the adventures and the motivation for players to act can feel erratic.
