= Tales from the Yawning Portal =

Role-playing game adventure

- Rules required: Dungeons & Dragons, 5th edition
- Character levels: The Sunless Citadel: 1, The Forge of Fury: 3, The Hidden Shrine of Tamoachan: 5, White Plume Mountain: 8, Dead in Thay: 9, Against the Giants: 11, Tomb of Horrors: "high"
- Campaign setting: Varies
- First published: 2017
- ISBN: 978-0-7869-6609-7

Tales from the Yawning Portal is an adventure module anthology for the 5th edition of the Dungeons & Dragons fantasy role-playing game.

== Summary ==
Tales from the Yawning Portal is an anthology of updated modules and adventures from previous editions. The modules are modified to use the fifth edition rules, and adjusted to match differing levels of player characters, so that the adventures can be played in the order they are presented in the book, or dropped into a home campaign. The adventures included, in the order of presentation and including original publication year, are:

- The Sunless Citadel (2000)
- The Forge of Fury (2000)
- The Hidden Shrine of Tamoachan (1980)
- White Plume Mountain (1979)
- Dead in Thay (2014)
- Against the Giants (1981)
- Tomb of Horrors (1978)

== Publication history ==
Tales from the Yawning Portal was released on March 24, 2017, in local game stores and was later released through other retailers on April 4, 2017.

== Reception ==
In Publishers Weekly's "Best-selling Books Week Ending April 17, 2017", Tales from the Yawning Portal was #6 in "Hardcover Nonfiction" and sold 10,348 units. Tales from the Yawning Portal was one of the Judges' Spotlight Winners at the 2017 ENnie Awards.

Destructoid, Bleeding Cool, and Paste Magazine all highlighted the module nature of this book unlike the more linear structure of Storm King's Thunder. In Paste Magazine's review, Cameron Kunzelman wrote that "Tales from the Yawning Portal rides the line between nostalgia and ease of access for new players" and that it "has a little something for every kind of D&D player or DM".

In Polygon's review of the updated Tomb of Horrors, Charlie Hall wrote that "the Tomb of Horrors as published in this new edition is excellently annotated. You should have no trouble moving players along from room to room. What may trip you up, however, are descriptions of the rooms themselves. This new version is conspicuously light on art, and Gygax’s descriptions can feel a bit dated to modern ears".
