= HeartQuest =

Series of gamebooks

HeartQuest was a series of six interactive novels published by TSR, Inc. for young teenagers during the 1980s. The series was a spin-off from their main Endless Quest series set in the world of Dungeons & Dragons. With each novel billed as a "quest for romance and adventure", the series was intended to appeal primarily to a female audience.

As the series was not in print for long, some of the books are very difficult to find, especially the last two. The first four were printed together in November 1983, and distributed in larger numbers.

The series is composed of:

1. Ring of the Ruby Dragon by Jeannie Black
2. Talisman of Valdegarde by Madeleine Simon
3. Secret Sorceress by Linda Lowery
4. Isle of Illusion by Madeleine Simon
5. Moon Dragon Summer by Linda Lowery
6. Lady of the Winds by Kate Novak

Each book follows a female main character who is frequently embarking on a quest to avoid being relegated to a typically feminine role in life, such as being forced to marry or otherwise being prevented from engaging in heroic pursuits. The heroine is presented with a task (locating a treasure, defeating a dragon) and encounters one or two eligible young men along the way. Depending on the choices the reader makes, the heroine may successfully complete the quest, find romance, or both.

== Reception ==
Meghan Ball for Tor.com said that "Alas, the initial HeartQuest books didn't sell as well as the publisher had anticipated and the series was cancelled after six volumes. The paperbacks are hard to find now and considered expensive rarities if you do manage to snag one. It's a shame—it feels like they were really onto something here."
