= White Plume Mountain =

Role-playing game adventure

- Cover of the 1981 reprint of White Plume Mountain. Art by Jeff Dee.
- Code: S2
- TSR product code: 9027
- Rules required: AD&D (1st Edition)
- Character levels: 5 - 10
- Campaign setting: Greyhawk
- Authors: Lawrence Schick
- First published: 1979

Linked modules
- S1 S2 S3 S4

White Plume Mountain is an adventure module for the Advanced Dungeons & Dragons fantasy role-playing game, written by Lawrence Schick and published by TSR in 1979. The 16-page adventure bears the code "S2" ("S" for "special"). The adventure is a dungeon crawl where the players' characters are hired to retrieve three "notorious" magical weapons, each possessing its own intelligence. The adventure contains art by Erol Otus, and a cover by Jeff Dee. A sequel, Return to White Plume Mountain, was published in 1999, and an updated version conforming to v3.5 rules was released online in 2005. The original was again updated for the 5th edition in 2017 as the fourth part of Tales from the Yawning Portal.

White Plume Mountain was well received by critics. It was ranked the 9th greatest Dungeons & Dragons adventure of all time by Dungeon magazine in 2004. One judge, commenting on the ingenuity required to complete the adventure, described it as "the puzzle dungeon to end all puzzle dungeons." A review for British magazine White Dwarf gave it an overall rating of 8/10, noting that the adventure focuses on problem solving. It is also the favorite adventure of Wired magazine's Ken Denmead, who described it as the "amusement park of dungeons". Other adventures in the S series include Tomb of Horrors, Expedition to the Barrier Peaks, and Lost Caverns of Tsojcanth.

== Plot summary ==
White Plume Mountain is set in the World of Greyhawk, a campaign setting for Dungeons & Dragons. The module is a dungeon crawl, precipitated by the theft of three magical, sentient weapons: a trident named Wave, a war hammer named Whelm, and a sword named Blackrazor (all three were introduced in this adventure). The weapons' former owners each received a copy of a taunting poem, instructing them that the weapons are located in White Plume Mountain. The poem is signed by the wizard Keraptis, who thirteen hundred years ago descended into the volcanic mountain with a company of gnomes and disappeared. The player characters' goal is to follow the same path and retrieve the weapons from Keraptis' lair.

The adventure is divided into 27 encounters across a 16-page module. Encounters are varied and each presents its own challenges. Encounter seven necessitates characters jumping from platform to platform above a sea of hot mud whilst evading erupting geysers; this in turn leads to encounter eight and a room of permanent darkness where a vampire guards Whelm. Encounter 17 occurs in a giant but fragile bubble located above a boiling lake, with the players needing to defeat a giant crab and retrieve Wave without damaging the bubble. Encounter 26 involves negotiating a magical ziggurat populated by various monsters (including sea lions, giant crayfish, giant scorpions, and manticores) before encounter 28, a battle against an ogre mage who possesses Blackrazor. A final challenge on departing is an encounter with two to four efreet if the characters have succeeded in taking two or three of the magical weapons.

== Publication history ==
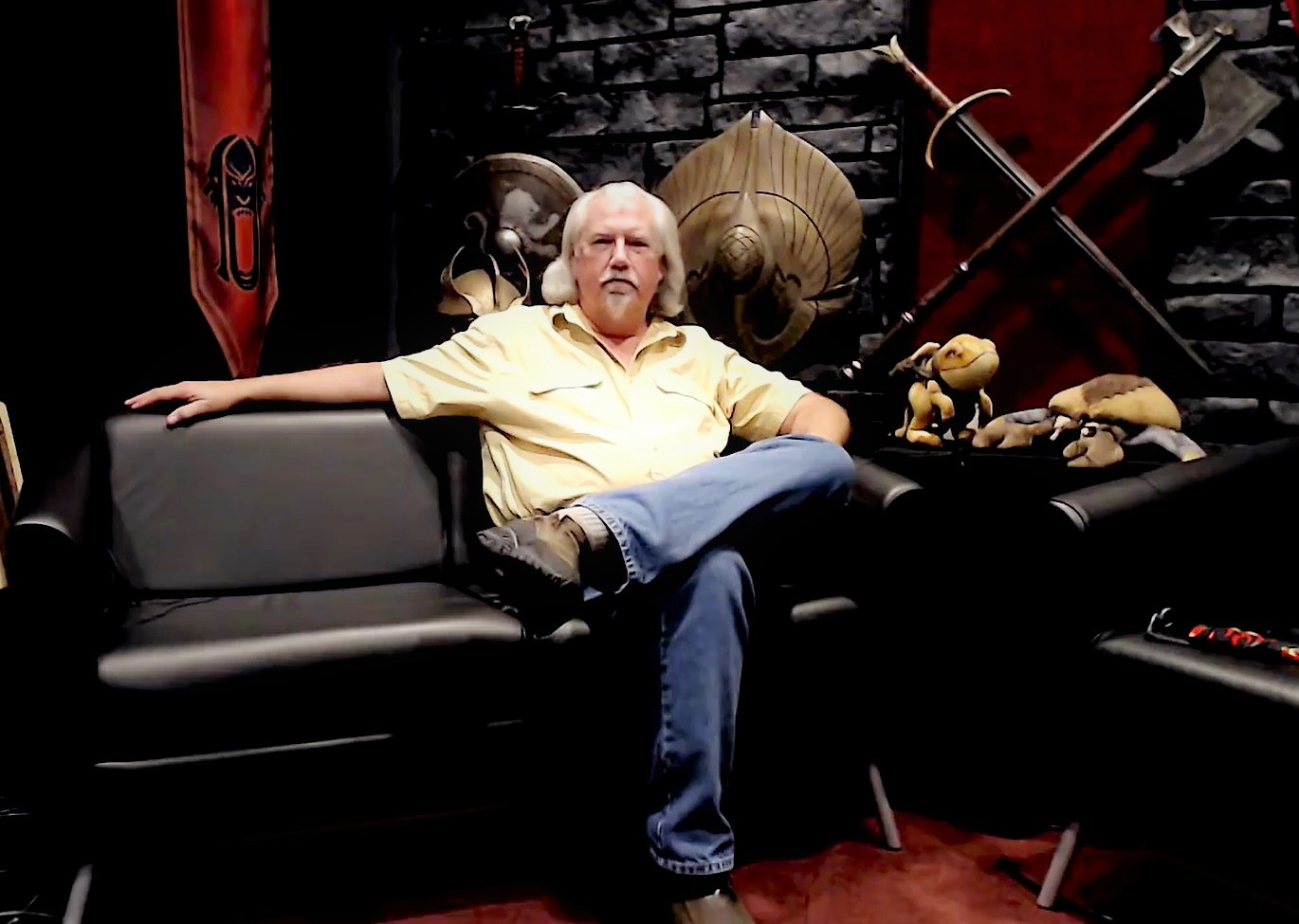
The adventure was designed by Lawrence Schick (pictured in 2016).

The original White Plume Mountain adventure was written by Lawrence Schick, and was published by TSR in 1979. It features interior art by Erol Otus and David C. Sutherland III, calligraphy by Darlene Pekul, and a front cover by Sutherland. The module includes a 12-page booklet and an outer folder which featured a two-color cover in the original printing; the module was expanded to 16 pages and rereleased with a full-color cover by Jeff Dee in 1981. The adventure was included as part of the Realms of Horror abridged compilation produced in 1987. To celebrate the 25th anniversary of the Dungeons & Dragons game in 1999, a reprinting of the original adventure was made available in the Dungeons & Dragons Silver Anniversary Collector's Edition boxed set, with slight modifications to make it distinguishable from the original (for collecting purposes). Wizards of the Coast also released a sequel to the adventure in 1999, Return to White Plume Mountain, as part of the TSR 25th Anniversary series of publications. The events in the sequel are assumed to take place 20 years following those in the original. It was made into a novel of the same name by Paul Kidd for the Greyhawk Classics series.

Schick wrote the module while applying for a job with TSR. He took what he felt were the best parts from his previously created dungeons and put them together to create White Plume Mountain. After looking at it, TSR hired him and published the module without making any changes. Looking back in an interview, Schick said that he was "a little embarrassed to this day by Blackrazor, inasmuch as it's such a blatant rip-off of Elric's Stormbringer; I would not have put it into the scenario if I ever thought it might be published." Schick later admitted that it was gratifying to have his adventure published as-is, "but also a little embarrassing, since the adventure was really just a sampler of clever ideas that were never fully fleshed out. Its central conceit, a 'funhouse' dungeon full of tricky obstacles designed to challenge adventurers for the amusement of a mad wizard, was already a cliché even at that date."

In 2005, an online version of the adventure was released as a free download, updated to conform with v3.5 rules (Wizards of the Coast periodically alters the rules of Dungeons & Dragons and releases a new version). The revised module is designed for characters of the seventh level of experience. Return to White Plume Mountain has also received a v3.5 update and is likewise available for free download on their website. In both of the revised modules, the classic weapons associated with them (Blackrazor, Whelm and Wave for White Plume Mountain, Frostrazor for Return to White Plume Mountain) have been converted into Legacy Weapons.

All four modules of the S-series were included as part of the Dungeons of Dread hardcover adventure collection, released on March 19, 2013. In the foreword, Schick wrote that "unlike Tomb of Horrors, the challenges in White Plume Mountain were designed to make players think, work together as a party, and ultimately win through and feel successful. Players liked that."

In 2017, Wizards re-released White Plume Mountain updated to 5th Edition rules as part of the Tales from the Yawning Portal collection.

== Reception ==
A battle against a giant crab in a dome at the floor of a volcanic lake? Check. Reverse gravity water tubes with kayaking bad guys? Check. A completely frictionless surface, studded with pit traps? Check.

— Mike Mearls describing the adventure's appeal in Dungeon magazine

White Plume Mountain was well received by critics. Dungeon Master for Dummies lists White Plume Mountain as one of the ten best classic adventures, referring to it as a "classic dungeon crawl." It was ranked the 9th greatest Dungeons & Dragons adventure of all time by Dungeon magazine in 2004, on the 30th anniversary of the Dungeons & Dragons game. Judge Mike Mearls commented on the ingenuity required to complete the adventure, describing it as "the puzzle dungeon to end all puzzle dungeons". Further, when speaking to why it is one of the top adventures ever, he said that while it lacked the "sheer brutality" of Tomb of Horrors, it made up for it with "crazy, over the top, pure fun". Another Judge, Clark Peterson, said that he liked the three magical weapons: Wave, Whelm, and Blackrazor. To Peterson, just the inclusion of Blackrazor makes White Plume Mountain a "classic". The editors of Dungeon felt that the adventure was defined by the ziggurat and its monsters.

Kirby T. Griffis reviewed the adventure in The Space Gamer #37. Griffis found the background interesting, namely Keraptis having stolen the magical weapons from prominent dealers, and the player having been hired to get them back, with only a cryptic poem to help. He found the module well organized and its content more believable than most, and despite its shortness he stated, "This on the whole is a very good module. There are no real flaws."

Jim Bambra reviewed White Plume Mountain for the British magazine White Dwarf, and rated it favorably at 8/10 overall. He gave playability, enjoyment, and skill ratings of 9/10, and a complexity rating of 7/10. He noted that the adventure focuses on problem solving, with "many interesting problems for players to overcome". Comparing it to the challenges in the previous S series adventure Tomb of Horrors, Bambra found White Plume Mountain "quite lenient." Where in Tomb of Horrors a wrong decision would leave the player's character dead, in White Plume Mountain it merely leaves the player frustrated. The adventure's tests are "designed to stretch a party to its limits, not deal death at every opportunity".

Ken Denmead of Wired says that White Plume Mountain is his favorite adventure, if not necessarily the best. For him, it was the "amusement park of dungeons". He describes the story arc, where the adventurers are hired to retrieve three magic items, as similar to the A-Team or The Equalizer: "You've been hired to help when no one else has been able." He felt that while the sword Blackrazor was a "blatant ripoff of Elric", it was "still way cool".

Denmead commented on several of the adventure's encounters. He felt the cavern with boiling mud, hanging disks, and geysers, was "just cruel". Concerning the permanently dark room that houses a vampire, he commented on the ease with which one player's character can easily hit that of another in the gloom. He describes the room where a giant crab guards the trident Wave as "basically a bubble inside a tank of boiling water", noting the crab knows not to pierce the walls and asks, "Are you that smart?" Also, if the players end the adventure with the magic weapons, they need to "bribe" their Dungeon Master to allow them to keep the items.

TheGamer in 2022 ranked it as #7 on their list of "The Best 3.5 Edition Adventures".

== In video games ==
Dungeons & Dragons Online released an adaptation of the White Plume Mountain adventure in 2018. It includes many of the original encounters, challenges, and monsters from the original module. The rewards for defeating this dungeon include the three sentient weapons, Blackrazor, Whelm, and Wave, though the last is depicted as a quarterstaff, as the game doesn't include tridents..
