= Beithir =

Large snake-like cryptid in Scottish folklore

In Scottish folklore, the beithir is a large snakelike creature or dragon.

== Etymology ==
The Scottish Gaelic word beithir has been defined variously as "serpent", "lightning", and "thunderbolt". It is also referred to as beithir-nimh ("venomous serpent") and nathair ("serpent" and "adder"). The word may also mean "wild beast" and may be derived from the Norse for "bear" according to Celtic mythology scholar James MacKillop.

== Folklore ==
The beithir is described as "the largest and most deadly kind of serpent", or as a dragon (but without certain typical European folklore draconic features such as wings or fiery breath). It dwells in mountainous caves and corries (valleys) and is equipped with a venomous sting. If a person is stung by the beithir then they must head for the nearest body of water such as a river or loch. If they can reach it before the beithir does then they are cured, but if the monster reaches it first then the victim is doomed. Another cure for the sting is water in which the head of another snake has been placed. The beithir is considered one of the fuath, a general term for various monsters and spirits associated with water.

It is said that if a normal snake is killed then the head must be separated a proper distance from its body and destroyed. Otherwise, both parts will come together and the snake will return to life as a beithir. Donald Alexander Mackenzie in Scottish Folklore and Folk Life (1935) drew a possible connection between the beithir and the mythological hag known as the Cailleach Bheur. In a story from Argyll the Cailleach was slain by a hunter who hacked her to pieces, but she returned to life when all her body parts came together again. Mackenzie suggested that the serpent-dragon of the loch may be one of her forms.

John Francis Campbell in 1890 recounted a traditional story about a wicked stepmother who was the wife of an Irish king, and she gave the king's son a magic shirt that was a beithir in disguise. As long as the "great snake" remained coiled about his neck, the prince was under his stepmother's enchantment, but he was eventually freed from the beithir with the help of a wise woman.

John Gregorson Campbell in 1900 provided an account of the beithir:

The big beast of Scanlastle in Islay was one of this kind. It devoured seven horses on its way to Loch-in-daal. A ship was lying at anchor in the loch at the time, and a line of barrels filled with deadly spikes, and with pieces of flesh laid upon them, was placed from the shore to the ship. Tempted by the flesh, the "loathly worm" made its way out on the barrels and was killed by the spikes and cannon.

Writing in the Celtic Review in 1908, the folklorist E. C. Watson described the beithir as a "venomous and destructive creature". She suggested the basis of the legends were founded in the destructive characteristics of lightning and serpents.

== Reported sightings ==
In the 1930s beithirs were reported on ground near Loch a’ Mhuillidh in Glen Strathfarrar and Sgùrr na Lapaich. A group of fishermen saw a creature about 9–10 feet (2.7–3.0 m) long coiled in a gorge near Kilmorack in 1975. It became agitated upon sighting the fishermen and swam away towards Beaufort Castle.

== Origins ==
The creature might be a mythological elaboration of the grass snake (Natrix natrix), which can grow up to 6.5 feet (2.0 m) in length in southern Europe. Another possible source of the myth is the European eel (Anguilla anguilla), which spawn in the Atlantic Ocean and swim upstream into freshwater, and grow up to 4 feet (1.2 m).

== See also ==
- Beinn a' Bheithir
- Lake monsters
- Loch Ness Monster
