= Thomas M. Reid =

American game designer and author

- Born: December 23, 1966 (age 59); Fort Collins, Colorado, U.S.
- Education: University of Houston; University of Texas at Arlington; University of Texas at Austin (BA)
- Occupations: Author; game designer
- Spouse: Teresa
- Children: 3
- Parent(s): Tony Reid; Norma Reid
- Writing career
- Genre: Fantasy
- Notable works: The Temple of Elemental Evil (2001); The Emerald Scepter (2005)

Thomas M. Reid (born December 23, 1966, in Fort Collins, Colorado) is an American author and game designer who grew up in Arlington, Texas. Reid attended the University of Houston where he minored in Creative Writing. Subsequently, he got a job at Wizards of the Coast writing Advanced Dungeons & Dragons (AD&D) books. During his tenure there, he wrote many AD&D novels. After Wizards was bought out by Hasbro, Reid resigned and moved back to Texas along with his wife and three children where he continues his creative writing vocation.

== Early life and education ==
Thomas M. Reid was born to Norma and Tony Reid in a snowstorm in the mountains of Fort Collins, Colorado, two days before the Christmas of 1966. He spent the first two years of his life living in Colorado and Virginia before the family moved back to Texas, growing up in the Dallas-Fort Worth area. Reid graduated high school in 1985, and after a year at the University of Houston, he returned to the DFW area and changed his major to liberal arts. While attending college at UT Arlington he spent time playing Dungeons & Dragons again with all his old childhood friends. Eventually, he came to Austin, where he met his wife Teresa and got a B.A. in history from the University of Texas in 1989.

== Career ==
Reid answered a TSR advertisement in the back of Dragon Magazine seeking professional editors, so he and Teresa moved to Delavan, Wisconsin, in the fall of 1991. Reid lived in Wisconsin for nearly six years, working initially as an editor and eventually being promoted to creative director at TSR, Inc. When Wizards of the Coast purchased the company and relocated everyone to Washington, Reid and his family moved there too. During his ten years with the company, Reid had a hand in a variety of products and lines, including the core D&D, Forgotten Realms, Ravenloft, and Planescape lines, and the Star Wars and Wheel of Time RPGs. Some of his personal favorite editing and design projects include Dragon Mountain, a trilogy of beholder adventures, Tale of the Comet, and the golem Angelique in Children of the Night: The Created. In addition to gaming material, Reid has written a handful of Dragon Magazine articles and a pair of short stories that appear in Forgotten Realms anthologies. Reid is the author of more than a dozen short stories and novels, including Insurrection, the second book of the R.A. Salvatore's War of the Spider Queen series for the Forgotten Realms. He also wrote the novels Gridrunner for the Star*Drive setting and Temple of Elemental Evil for the Greyhawk setting.

Reid eventually returned to Texas, and lives in the greater Austin area with his wife and three kids—Aidan, Galen, and Quinton. They live on a quarter-acre cat ranch in the Texas Hill Country. Reid stays home and writes full-time now, but when he's not working, Reid loves to go hiking and camping, play with his kids, and root for the Rangers, Cowboys, Stars, and Texas Longhorns. He also loves to play softball, indoor soccer, touch football, basketball, tennis, and golf in the daytime, and to game, read, write, and paint miniatures after dark.

== Novels ==
=== Greyhawk ===
- The Temple of Elemental Evil (2001)

=== Forgotten Realms ===
- Insurrection (December 2002)
- The Sapphire Crescent (November 2003)
- The Ruby Guardian (November 2004)
- The Emerald Scepter (August 2005)
- The Gossamer Plain (May 2007)
- The Fractured Sky (November 2008)
- The Crystal Mountain (July 2009)
