= Jean Blashfield Black =

American game designer and author

- Born: Jean Blashfield; Madison, Wisconsin, United States
- Education: University of Michigan
- Occupation: Game designer
- Spouse: Wallace Black

Jean Blashfield Black is a game designer and author of gamebooks.

== Early life and education ==
Jean Blashfield was born in Madison, Wisconsin, and raised in Evanston, Illinois. She received a B.A. in Experimental Psychology and English from the University of Michigan, and did graduate work in Science Education at the University of Chicago.

== Career ==
After graduating from college, Blashfield was hired by Wallace Black at Children's Press in Chicago, where she started working on a 20-volume science encyclopedia. Within a few months, she was promoted to Managing Editor, and handled all the editing and production, managed a staff of 20, and wrote a number of articles for the encyclopedia. The Young People's Science Encyclopedia was prepared prepared in cooperation with the National College of Education (now known as National Louis University), was published beginning in 1962, until 1993. Blashfield commented, "The most exciting event of my professional career was the publishing of this first encyclopedia. With that job, I was ballooned into the mainstream of publishing before I had even known where I was heading. It was a thrilling, enriching experience — being with experts in their fields, top consultants from many walks of life, and enjoying the concepts of the varied artists. I think being involved with the compiling of a major reference work of any kind is a stirring (and exhausting) experience."

In 1964, Blashfield took a job in London: "The logic of that move escapes me now, except there was no position in Chicago at the time that I was interested in, and the thought of moving to New York scared the wits out of me." While in London, her first works for the company were published - a series of Gilbert and Sullivan operas illustrated and retold for children, also published in the United States by Franklin Watts. She comments: "I also wrote a book on scientific experiments, and served as American consultant on several adult 'coffee table books,' one of which was a book of photographs by Lord Snowden, Princess Margaret's ex-husband".

In 1967, Wallace Black started his own company, New Horizons Publishers, and asked Blashfield to come back to Chicago as his editor-in-chief to create a 14-volume aviation and space encyclopedia: "It seemed like too good an opportunity to miss, so I left London and came back to the United States. It was quite a challenge overseeing the work on a science encyclopedia for high school students and adults. The science was much more involved than it had been on the earlier set, but there were a lot of benefits, too [...] The Air Force flew me to a number of special events, including the rollout of the C-5 aircraft where President Johnson spoke. I saw the launch of the first Saturn V rocket from Cape Kennedy, and I spent a lot of time in Washington, D.C." Above and Beyond: The Encyclopedia of Aviation and Space Sciences was published in 1968. After that, Blashfield moved to Washington, D.C., and worked as a freelance editor and writer.

In 1976, Wallace Black, now widowed, had come to Washington on business. "We got together for dinner one night [...] and three months later we were married." The next year, the Blacks moved to Lake Geneva, Wisconsin, and then had two children, a son, Winston, and a daughter, Chandelle.

A friend introduced her to Rose Estes, who wrote a number of the early Endless Quest books for TSR. "I didn't know about TSR, even though it was only a few miles away. I had heard of the Dungeons & Dragons game, of course, but I had no idea it was published in Wisconsin." As she was already experienced as an industry editor, Jean Black was hired as Education Editor for TSR's new education department, which was created to sell classroom modules for use by teachers. She worked with Jim Ward to put together an education program. TSR decided not to hire an educational sales staff and the department eventually failed, and while Black suggested other educational ideas TSR did not take advantage of these. Black then became the Managing Editor for TSR's new Book Department, and leveraged the success of TSR's gamebooks as a step toward the release of the Dragonlance novels. Black chose Tracy Hickman and Margaret Weis to write first Dragons of Autumn Twilight (1984) and then the rest of the books in the Dragonlance Chronicles. She also wrote a number of gamebooks, including Master of Ravenloft (AD&D Adventure Gamebook #6), Ghost Tower (Super Endless Quest Book #2), and Villains of Volturnus (Endless Quest Book #8).
