= Tomb of Annihilation =

Module for Dungeons and Dragons game

- Cover art by Ben Oliver, 2017
- Rules required: Dungeons & Dragons, 5th edition
- Character levels: 1-11
- Campaign setting: Forgotten Realms
- Authors: Chris Perkins, Will Doyle, Steve Winter, with additional design by Adam Lee and story consulting by Pendleton Ward
- First published: September 8, 2017
- Pages: 256
- ISBN: 978-0-7869-6610-3

Tomb of Annihilation is an adventure module for the 5th edition of the Dungeons & Dragons fantasy role-playing game. The adventure was inspired by Tomb of Horrors.

== Summary ==
Tomb of Annihilation centers around the Deathcurse, a wasting disease that slowly kills anyone who has ever been raised from the dead and prevents anyone who has died from being raised, and the Soulmonger artifact that caused the disease. "The narrative of the campaign begins with the group being hired by Syndra Silvane, a wealthy former adventurer who is afflicted with the Deathcurse. Her sources have tracked the Soulmonger to the ancient jungles of Chult. [...] At its core, Tomb of Annihilation follows a classic quest structure. The party has an objective, a deadline—Silvane is slowly dying, so each day the party spends exploring brings her closer to permanent death—and a sprawling expanse of dangerous wilderness stands in their way". This adventure module is designed to take player characters from 1st level to 11th level.

The table of contents lists the follow sections:

- Dramatis Personae
- Introduction
- Chapter 1: Port Nyanzaru
- Chapter 2: The Land of Chult
- Chapter 3: Dwellers of the Forbidden City
- Chapter 4: Fane of the Night Serpent
- Chapter 5: Tomb of the Nine Gods
- Appendix A: Character Backgrounds
- Appendix B: Random Encounters
- Appendix C: Discoveries
- Appendix D: Monsters and NPCs
- Appendix E: Player Handouts
- Appendix F: Trickster Gods of Omu
- Stat Blocks

== Publication history ==
The new module was announced in June 2017 during the Stream of Annihilation livestreamed event on the Wizards of the Coast's Twitch site. Tomb of Annihilation was released on September 8, 2017 as a 256-page hardcover book. It was also released as a digital product through the following Wizards of the Coast licensees: D&D Beyond, Fantasy Grounds, and Roll20.

Tomb of Annihilation was inspired by the classic adventure module Tomb of Horrors, "a lethal dungeon made by D&D co-creator Gary Gygax himself". Polygon reported that "Wizards of the Coast enlisted more playtesters to try the Dungeons & Dragons Tomb of Annihilation module than any adventure it has released before. Why? Because they were afraid no one would survive it". The module's setting of Chult in the Forgotten Realms was last explored in the 2nd edition of Dungeons & Dragons.

In October 2017, Kotaku reported that Chris Perkins "said that no black writers or consultants worked on Tomb of Annihilation". On the book's design, Perkins said "We didn't want to create a city that felt backward...It's a tale of Chultans reclaiming their own city and land and redefining who they are and moving way from the idea of warring tribes to a more business-minded culture. [...] The land that they live in is a savage land. That's just part of what Chult is. It's a place of monsters. It was our intention to show the Chultans have not only survived it, but have risen above it—that they have dispelled the warring tribal nature that previously defined them and are now actually thriving".

On June 17, 2020, in the wake of the George Floyd protests, Wizards of the Coast announced: "When every D&D book is reprinted, we have an opportunity to correct errors that we or the broader D&D community discovered in that book. Each year, we use those opportunities to fix a variety of things, including errors in judgment. In recent reprintings of Tomb of Annihilation and Curse of Strahd, for example, we changed text that was racially insensitive. Those reprints have already been printed and will be available in the months ahead. We will continue this process, reviewing each book as it comes up for a reprint and fixing such errors where they are present".

== Related products ==
The 7th season of D&D Adventurers League was themed around the Tomb of Annihilation storyline. It includes an adventure module that acts as a hook to lead into the book, "Tier 1 and 2 adventures [that] expand on Tomb of Annihilation's story and set the stage for Tier 3 and 4 play, which pick up right after the characters complete the hardcover adventure".

The 14th expansion of the Neverwinter video game aligned the free-to-play massively multiplayer online role-playing game with the Tomb of Annihilation storyline including a new campaign, a new dungeon and two new zones.

WizKids, a Wizards of the Coast licensee, released 44 pre-painted miniatures that correspond with the adventure including the lich Acererak. In October 2017, WizKids released a Tomb of Annihilation themed board game which can be played as a standalone game or can be combined "with the other D&D Adventure System Cooperative Play Board Games".

== Reception ==
In Publishers Weekly's "Best-selling Books Week Ending October 2, 2017", Tomb of Annihilation was #14 in "Hardcover Nonfiction" and sold 7,152 units.

Alex Springer, for SLUG Magazine, reported that the "Tomb of Annihilation is the type of campaign that can bring out the best—or worst—in a dungeon master" and highlighted mechanics such as new character backgrounds, exploration checks, the jungle themed creature appendix, and the lingering threat of permadeath due to the Soulmonger artifact. Springer wrote "When stacked up against Storm King's Thunder, Tomb of Annihilation feels blessedly streamlined and adventure-focused. There are no politics to navigate, no sieges to weather—it's just a deep dive into an unforgiving wilderness to destroy an artifact that can't be destroyed".

Cameron Kunzelman, for Paste, highlighted that the adventure is unique compared to previous modules and that the jungles of Chult are designed to try and kill you. Kunzelman wrote that "the jungles and dangers also have a slight feel of 'darkest Africa' to them, and the Chultan people are dark-skinned. The narrative beats in Tomb pull heavily from familiar sources like Edgar Rice Burroughs or Jules Verne, and those works have a long racialized history that is not often grappled with. [...] While the literary and visual content Tomb borrows from makes for interesting design and visuals, I think Wizards could have done more to interrogate those texts that they borrowed from and how they have a complicated past with general representations of 'Africa' writ large".

Cecilia D'Anastasio, for Kotaku, highlighted that the adventure uses "dated stereotypes of African cultures" and themes of colonialism which date back to the creation of the Chult setting. D'Anastasio wrote "Here's the rub: While many players I talked to enjoyed how the history and political structures of Chult were expanded in Tomb of Annihilation (and enjoyed the adventure's plot generally), they were still unimpressed by its execution. Its setting is an amalgamation of African cultures, a trope frequent in 20th century media that flattens the dimensionality of human experiences on the continent, which contains hundreds of ethnic groups".

In a review of Tomb of Annihilation in Black Gate, Andrew Zimmerman Jones said "The most recent Dungeons & Dragons 5th edition adventure book, Tomb of Annihilation [...] provides a good framework for a unleashing undead horrors upon a group of innocent fantasy adventurers."
