= Dungeon Survival Guide =

2007 role-playing game supplement

- Author: Bill Slavicsek and Christopher Perkins
- Genre: Role-playing game
- Publisher: Wizards of the Coast
- Publication date: October 2007
- Media type: Print
- Pages: 64
- ISBN: 978-0786947300

Dungeon Survival Guide is a supplement to the 3.5 edition of the Dungeons & Dragons role-playing game.

== Contents ==
Dungeon Survival Guide is an accessory that explores the features of dungeons in Dungeons & Dragons, and revisits 20 famous dungeons from throughout the game's history.

== Publication history ==
Dungeon Survival Guide was written by Bill Slavicsek and Christopher Perkins, and published in October 2007.

== Reception ==
Shannon Appelcline notes that the Dungeon Survival Guide was "poorly-received", as it was "pure fluff [...] with no stats at all", noting that Wizards of the Coast was preparing D&D 4th edition and avoided producing books that would soon be outdated.
