= Above and Beyond: The Encyclopedia of Aviation and Space Sciences =

First encyclopedia written about aviation and the aerospace industry

- Cover of volume 12 of Above and Beyond
- Author: Wallace B. Black, Publisher
- Language: English
- Subject: Science; aeronautics; astronautics; astronomy; history
- Genre: Reference encyclopedia
- Publisher: New Horizons Publishers, Inc.
- Publication date: 1967
- Publication place: United States
- Media type: 14 hardback volumes
- Pages: 2,677

Above and Beyond: The Encyclopedia of Aviation and Space Sciences was the first attempt at creating an encyclopedia of all matters related to the history, technology and aims of the aerospace industry as it existed in the late 1960s. Published in 1967 by New Horizons Publishers, Inc., of Chicago, this fourteen-volume collection was aimed primarily at teens and young adults.
