= The Temple of Elemental Evil (novel) =

Book by Thomas M. Reid

- Cover of the first edition
- Language: English
- Genre: Fantasy novel
- Publication place: United States
- Media type: Print (Paperback)

The Temple of Elemental Evil is a 2001 fantasy novel by Thomas M. Reid. It is set in the world of Greyhawk and based on the Dungeons & Dragons role-playing game, specifically the adventure T1-4 The Temple of Elemental Evil.

== Plot summary ==
The heroes entering the Temple seek to find a way to save the world from a demon struggling to escape captivity and an evil demigod working to gain control over the demon.

== Development ==
The Temple of Elemental Evil was published in May 2001.

This book is a novelization of The Temple of Elemental Evil adventure and features characters based on the characters that Reid developed with his friends while they played the module during college in a Greyhawk campaign.

== Reception ==
Reviewing the novel for Science Fiction Chronicle, Don D'Ammassa wrote that although it is "not earthshaking", the story is "well paced and logically developed, and there's even some reasonably good characterization."
