= Jeff Easley =

American artist (born 1954)

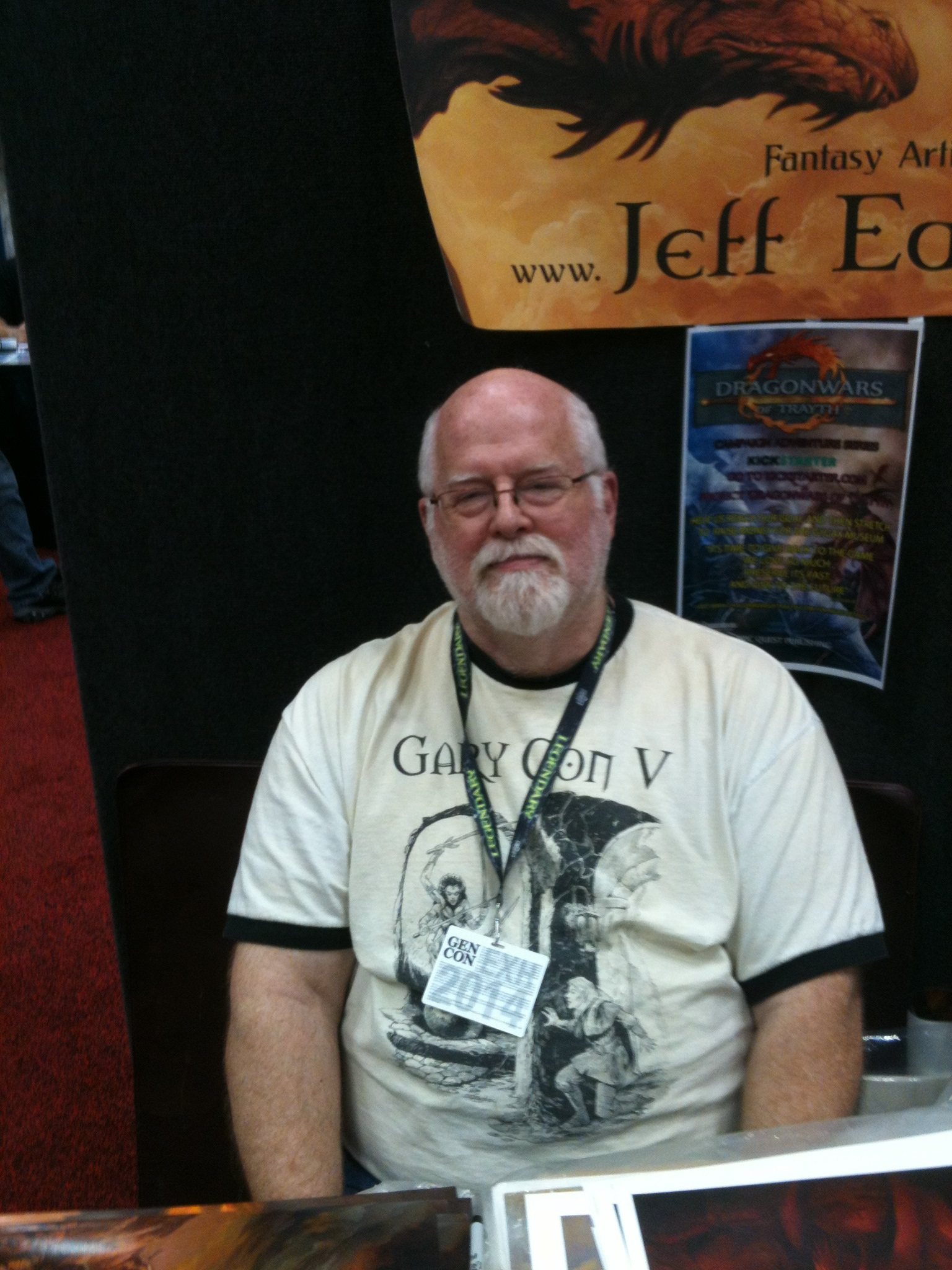
- Jeff Easley at GenCon Indy 2014
- Born: 1954; Nicholasville, Kentucky, United States
- Known for: Fantasy art, Illustration
- Spouse: Cynthia

Jeff Easley (born 1954) is an oil painter who creates fantasy artwork for role-playing games, comics, and magazines, as well as non-fantasy commercial art.

== Early life ==
Easley was born in Nicholasville, Kentucky in 1954. He spent time drawing as a child, particularly creatures such as ghosts and monsters. "I watched lots of monster movies on the late show, and built every monster model kit I could get my hands on," he said. He attended high school in Nicholasville, and then earned a Bachelor of Fine Arts in painting from Murray State University in Kentucky.

== Career ==
After Cynthia finished grad school, the couple moved to Massachusetts with some friends, where Easley began his career as a professional artist. "I did freelance work for Warren Publications, including covers and comic strips for Creepy, Eerie, and Vampirella, and for Marvel Comics magazines, including covers for Savage Sword of Conan and Bizarre Adventures. But my real income came from my job at the Okey-Doke Popcorn Company." He cites mid-20th-century artist Frank Frazetta as a major influence.

Easley met fellow Kentucky native and artist Larry Elmore through a mutual friend. "When I heard that Larry was planning to leave Fort Knox to join TSR, I got in touch with him and discovered that there might be other job opportunities there." He applied for a job with TSR, publisher of the popular role-playing game Dungeons & Dragons: "I... started here in March 1982. My first project was to paint gemstones on the spines of the first four Endless Quest books, but it was definitely uphill from there." Easley's first RPG piece for TSR was Lost Caverns of Tsojcanth, as an interior artist. His first published cover for TSR was the cover to the Revenge of the Rainbow Dragons Endless Quest book.

He went on to do much of the front cover artwork for the popular series of Advanced Dungeons & Dragons hardback rulebooks of the 1980s and 1990s. Some of his artwork from the period was featured on the covers of book such as the AD&D Player's Handbook, Dungeon Master Guide, Tome of Magic, the Monstrous Manual book, and over a dozen Monstrous Compendium supplements, as well several editions of the basic D&D box. Some of his notable works include the cover art of the 1st edition incarnations of the Monster Manual, Monster Manual II, Legends & Lore, Unearthed Arcana, Oriental Adventures, and Dungeoneer's Survival Guide, as well as the 2nd edition core books (the Player's Handbook, Dungeon Master's Guide, and Monstrous Manual). He also painted the first edition Battlesystem cover, the revised Gamma World cover, and numerous modules and Endless Quest book covers and a Dragonlance Calendar cover. He did the cover of Dragonlance Adventures and other artwork for the Dragonlance series. One of his pieces of artwork, "Red Dragon", was featured on the cover of the AD&D book, Monster Manual, from 1983 to 1989. With the acquisition of TSR by Wizards of the Coast, Easley provided illustrations for forty-nine cards for the Magic: The Gathering game sets from Mercadian Masques through Eventide. While working freelance, Easley designed gold-and-ivory dragon inlays for deluxe limited-edition guitars. He also provided the artwork for Italian power metal band Rhapsody of Fire's 2006 album Triumph or Agony.

In 2014, Scott Taylor of Black Gate, named Jeff Easley as #5 in a list of The Top 10 RPG Artists of the Past 40 Years, saying "His work covered every single AD&D 1E hardcover core book as well as the AD&D 2E Player's Handbook and DMG. He has also done countless b/w illustrations and there is no artist out there who has filled more RPG pages with artwork than Jeff."
