= Lawrence Schick =

Dungeons and Dragons game designer

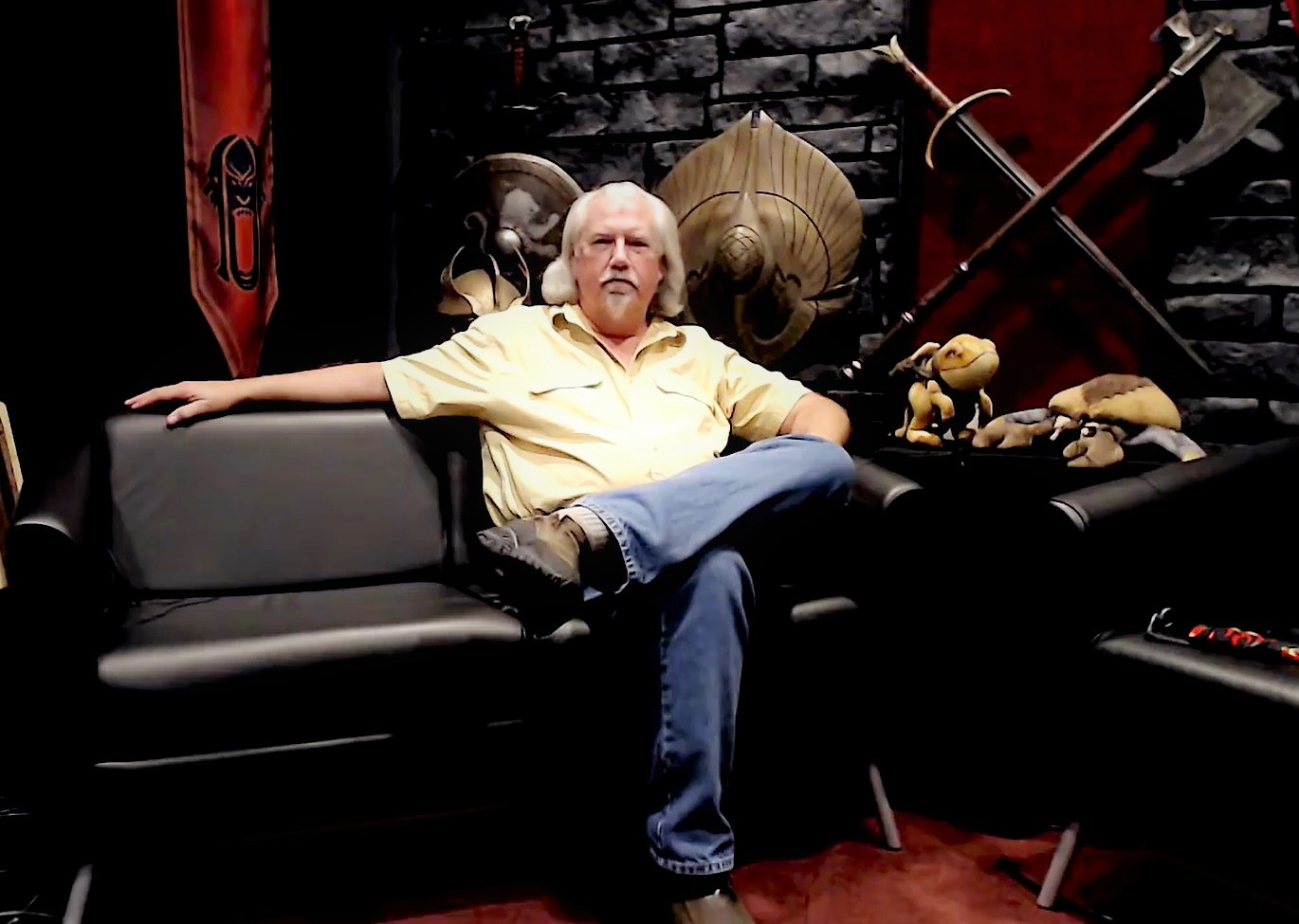
- Schick in 2016
- Born: United States
- Education: Kent State University
- Occupations: Game designer, writer,
- Writing career
- Pen name: Lawrence Ellsworth

Lawrence Schick is an American game designer and writer associated with tabletop role-playing games and video games.

== Early life and education ==
Lawrence Schick attended Kent State University in Ohio.

== Career ==
Schick, as the head of design and development at TSR, brought aboard Tom Moldvay and David Cook and many other new employees as TSR continued to grow in the early 1980s. Schick created White Plume Mountain in 1979, an adventure module for the Advanced Dungeons & Dragons fantasy role-playing game, published by TSR in 1979; the adventure was incorporated into the Greyhawk setting after the publication of the World of Greyhawk Fantasy Game Setting (1980). White Plume Mountain was ranked the ninth greatest Dungeons & Dragons adventure of all time by Dungeon magazine in 2004; one judge, commenting on the ingenuity required to complete the adventure, described it as "the puzzle dungeon to end all puzzle dungeons."

In 1981, he contributed to Chaosium's multi-system box set Thieves' World based on Robert Lynn Asprin's anthology series of the same title. The following year, he coauthored the TSR science fiction RPG Star Frontiers with David "Zeb" Cook. Schick wrote the book Heroic Worlds: A History and Guide to Role-Playing Games, which was published in 1991.

Schick has written many other games during his career. Schick is a former executive with America Online. In May 2009, Schick joined ZeniMax Online Studios as the lead content designer for The Elder Scrolls Online. In 2010, he was promoted to lead writer, and he became lead loremaster in 2011. He left ZeniMax Online in 2019. He has also been working on writing a mobile game for WarDucks in Dublin, Ireland. Since 2021, he has worked at Larian Studios' Dublin office as a Principal Narrative Designer for role playing video game Baldur's Gate 3. Schick and the other Baldur's Gate 3 writers won the Nebula Award for Best Game Writing.

== The Musketeers Cycle ==
Under the pseudonym Lawrence Ellsworth, Schick began translating The Red Sphinx, Alexander Dumas's late-career sequel to The Three Musketeers. He continued his work with The Three Musketeers itself, published in February 2018, before deciding to provide modern English-language translations for the full trilogy of The d'Artagnan Romances as well as the two novels of The Count of Moret in nine volumes. As of 2025 all of the following volumes have been published:

- Book One, The Three Musketeers
- Book Two, The Red Sphinx
- Book Three, Twenty Years After (volume one of Vingt Ans Après)
- Book Four, Blood Royal (volume two of Vingt Ans Après)
- Book Five, Between Two Kings (volume one of Le Vicomte de Bragelonne)
- Book Six, Court of Daggers (volume two of Le Vicomte de Bragelonne)
- Book Seven, Devil’s Dance (volume three of Le Vicomte de Bragelonne)
- Book Eight, Shadow of the Bastille (volume four of Le Vicomte de Bragelonne)
- Book Nine, The Man in the Iron Mask (volume five of Le Vicomte de Bragelonne)
