= World of Greyhawk Fantasy Game Setting =

Tabletop role-playing game supplement

The World of Greyhawk Fantasy Game Setting and the World of Greyhawk Fantasy World Setting are two closely related publications from TSR, Inc. that detail the fictional World of Greyhawk campaign setting for the Dungeons & Dragons (D&D) fantasy roleplaying game. Both publications were authored by Gary Gygax, and they were the first stand-alone offerings to provide detailed, comprehensive information regarding a D&D campaign setting.

== Early development of Greyhawk ==
In 1972, after seeing a demonstration of Dave Arneson's "Castle Blackmoor" game, Gary Gygax agreed with Arneson to co-develop a set of rules for a game that would eventually become known as Dungeons & Dragons. Gygax liked the idea of a castle and dungeon that players could explore, and created his own imaginary place called Castle Greyhawk, which he used to test and develop the game. With almost continuous play during the years 1972–1975, Gygax, and later his co-Dungeon Master (co-DM), Rob Kuntz, expanded the setting to include an entire world. After the creation of TSR, publication of D&D and the release of several adventures set in his world of Greyhawk, Gygax was surprised to learn that there was strong player demand for access to his fantasy setting. He agreed to publish a campaign setting based on his home campaign.

== The 1980 "Folio" edition ==
The World of Greyhawk Fantasy World Setting (1980 folio)

TSR intended to publish The World of Greyhawk early in 1979; the foreword by editor Allen Hammack was dated February 1979. Gygax himself assured Dragon readers in issue No. 37 that, barring catastrophe, the World of Greyhawk was ready for official release. However, Gygax's The World of Greyhawk (TSR 9025) did not hit store shelves until August 1980.

The World of Greyhawk consisted of a thirty-two page folio (this edition is often called the "World of Greyhawk folio" to distinguish it from later editions) and a 34 in × 44 in (86 cm × 112 cm) two-piece color map of the Flanaess, by Darlene Pekul. The book comes with a folder containing maps and a gazetteer which details all the states and regions found on the maps. In addition to details of geography, history, and political states mentioned above, Gygax also included the following:

- names for the days of the week (Starday, Sunday, Moonday, Godsday, Waterday, Earthday, Freeday),
- names for the twelve 28-day months and the four 7-day festivals that made up the 360-day year (Needfest, Fireseek, Readying, Coldeven, Growfest, Planting, Flocktime, Wealsun, Richfest, Reaping, Goodmonth, Harvester, Brewfest, Patchwall, Ready'reat, and Sunsebb)
- notes on scale and movement, so the DM could keep track of how long it would take the players to move from region to region
- royal and noble precedence, so the DM could ensure the players addressed heads of state properly
- orders of knighthood, for players who desired to join one
- a glossary of runes and glyphs that the DM could use to create puzzling messages, mysterious omens and vaguely worded portents

The first edition covers less than a quarter of the landmass of Oerth, concentrating on the eastern part of the continent of Oerik, giving only the most basic descriptions of each state; DMs were expected to elaborate on these areas in order to make them an integral part of their own individual campaigns.

The World of Greyhawk set describes a complete world for a Dungeon Master that is ready to use for campaign adventuring. The map comes as two halves, with the Gazetteer booklet detailing the symbols on the map, and giving information on the monsters, peoples, geography, history, and government in the Greyhawk world.

=== Reception ===
Elisabeth Barrington reviewed the supplement in The Space Gamer No. 33. She commented that "When I first saw the module as it came in the mail, my reaction was, 'Good heavens!' I was struck by the beautiful artwork on the cover folder, bearing the arms of all the principal persons and organizations of the world. The map is even more beautiful, in full color, and everything is clearly marked and named. Everything is thought of for descriptions in the booklet; I doubt if most campaign worlds are this complete (mine certainly isn't)." She continued: "Though the map would have been difficult to package in one piece, that would have made laying it out a bit easier. It is almost too large. We didn't have enough table space for it; it had to go on the wall or the floor. The book is printed in small type. It gives you a headache if you are trying to study some aspect of Greyhawk for any length of time." Barrington concluded her review by saying, "This is an example of how to organize a world if you are a 'completeness' fanatic. Even if you don't use this particular world, it will help you get started on one of your own."

The World of Greyhawk folio received two reviews in Dragon No. 46. In his review, Jeff Sieken was generally impressed, mentioning its colorful folder, the outside covers of which are "adorned with the numerous coats-of-arms of the various states, cities and factions chronicled within the gazetteer". He said the two maps were "easily the highlight of the product", and that Darlene and the TSR art department "deserve to be congratulated for their quality", although he considered the sometimes dubious accuracy of the maps to be a major drawback. He felt that reading the entire booklet would give one a pretty good understanding of the world depicted on the map, but he found that more information on some places would have been useful, and remarked on the lack of pantheon of Greyhawk-specific deities, as well as the lack of any details on the famous personalities of the world. In Kenneth W. Burke's review, he remarked that he was glad to finally have "a universal constant" in the form of an official campaign setting. Burke complained mostly about minor flaws in the work, but was particularly incensed about the use of the terms "cannibal" and "savages", assuming this was a derogatory reference directed at Africans. Regardless, Burke rated the folio a 9 out of 10, blaming its problems on the product's size and scope. Lawrence Schick, Vice President of Product Development at the time for TSR Hobbies, Inc., responded to the two reviews. He stated that the idea behind the product was "to provide a setting for a fantasy campaign, a coherent place where fantastic things could happen", and that although The World of Greyhawk was based on Gygax's own campaign, the publication "was made deliberately vague in many areas so that individual DMs could impress their own ideas and personalities upon it". He also responded to Burke's charges: "As regards the savages, nowhere in the text of the Gazetteer is there any indication of anybody's skin color. Nobody here ever gave it any thought, because it doesn't matter."

Game designer Jim Bambra found the original set "disappointing", because "there is only so much information you can cram into a 32-page booklet, particularly when covering such a large area".

Schick, in his 1991 book Heroic Worlds, describes the campaign setting as "a medieval-Europe-type fantasy world where most of the early AD&D scenarios are set".

== Between editions ==
Gygax used TSR's Dragon magazine as a platform to update the folio edition, and from 1980 to 1983, articles on weather, the peoples of Greyhawk, and in-depth examinations of the various political regions appeared in its pages. Gygax also provided details of nineteen deities that could be used in the Greyhawk setting. Numerous projects were planned to add more depth and detail to the setting after the publication of the initial edition of the boxed set, but many of these projects never appeared for various reasons.

== The 1983 boxed set ==
World of Greyhawk Fantasy Game Setting (1983 boxed set)

In 1983, TSR published an expanded boxed set of the campaign world, World of Greyhawk (usually called the "Greyhawk boxed set" to differentiate it from other editions). The boxed set features a cover by Jeff Easley. This edition increases the total number of pages of information in the folio edition fourfold, to 128 pages. These are divided between an eighty-page booklet titled A Guide to the World of Greyhawk Setting: A Catalogue of the Land of the Flanaess, being the eastern portion of the continent of Oerik, of Oerth and a 48-page booklet titled Glossography for the Guide to the World of Greyhawk Fantasy Setting, compiled by Pluffet Smedger the Elder of the Royal University at Relmord, CY 998. The same four-color map of the Flanaess from the folio edition is also included.

The 1983 edition adds details for the gods of the setting, information on weather, tables to determine the place of birth for characters, encounter tables to be used for different kingdoms, and ideas for adventure scenarios. According to game designer Jim Bambra, "The second edition was much larger than the first and addressed itself to making the World of Greyhawk setting a more detailed and vibrant place."

=== The Guide ===
The larger Guide booklet is, in style and content, similar to the previously published folio. All the content of the folio edition is included in it, with a few changes. The focus of some of the details for each region is sharpened. For example, the rulers of countries, which had originally only had titles, were given names, and populations were given to within a thousand, rather than as rough estimates. The section regarding geographical features is reorganized and expanded. Gygax increased the four yearly festivals from six days to seven days; this increases the length of the calendar year from 360 days to 364 days and means each calendar date now always falls on the same day of the week every year.

New material was also added, mainly culled from the Dragon magazine articles published in the previous three years. This includes information about trees and other flora of the Flanaess; an examination of populations, including distribution of the four main human races, demi-humans (elves, dwarves, halflings), and humanoids (goblins and orcs); and human racial characteristics, including languages, appearance and modes of dress. There are also two one page maps, one of regional alignments (good, evil, etc.) and one of regional products and resources.

One fifth of the Guide is devoted to the deities of Greyhawk; in addition to the nineteen gods introduced in Gygax's Dragon articles, another thirty-one gods are added, for a total of fifty deities. However, only twenty-two are given a full description of their appearance, areas of influence, and worshipers. Nineteen of those are the original Greyhawk deities from Gygax's Dragon articles; the other three given full descriptions are Raxivort (whose full description had been previously published in issue No. 64 of Dragon,) Ulaa, and Xan Yae. Combat statistics and specific powers for these twenty-two deities are also included, but placed in a separate appendix in the Glossography booklet. The remainder of the deities are simply listed by name and sphere of influence.

In Gygax's original Dragon articles, no mention had been made of racial preferences for any of the gods. The boxed set edition introduces four pantheons, one for each of the four human races. (In this edition, there are no deities for non-humans.) The twelve deities of the Suel pantheon had been created by Len Lakofka, and he would subsequently publish a five-part article on them in the July–November 1984 issues of Dragon. Most of the other gods are assigned to one of the three remaining pantheons, while a few are either declared either common to all humans or of unknown origin.

=== The Glossography ===
The smaller 48-page booklet, the Glossography, contains reference tables for rates of movement, random encounter tables, and a list of rulers of each region. The booklet also contains a rewrite of David Axler's weather creation article from Dragon, although the number of tables is reduced from fourteen to ten. There are six examples of adventures that can be placed in the world of Greyhawk in the booklet, and the map coordinates of the twenty-one previously published TSR adventures set in Greyhawk. In addition, there is a section for determining a character's birthplace (from Len Lakofka's Dragon article), a list of notable non-player characters (from Gygax's Dragon article), and map coordinates for every region, city, and town marked on the color map. Finally, there are combat statistics for the 22 deities who had been accorded a full description in the Guide.

=== Reception ===
Chris Hunter reviewed the boxed set in Imagine magazine, giving it a balanced review. Hunter had some problems with the map (the two halves did not fit together well; rivers seemed to flow up into hills; deserts were too close to forests). However, he liked the Guide, noting that it "gives the DM an excellent base on which to construct a campaign". For those looking for a "grand design" for a campaign world and who do not mind "the restrictions imposed by using someone else's", the box "will prove a worthwhile purchase".

== Follow-up to 1983 edition ==
Publication of the World of Greyhawk was the first step in Gygax's vision for Oerth. Over the next few years, he planned to unveil other areas of the continent of Oerik, giving each new area the same in-depth treatment of history, geography, and politics as had been accorded the Flanaess. Gygax had also mapped out the other hemisphere of Oerth in his personal notes. Part of this would be Gygax's work, but Len Lakofka and Francois Froideval had also created material that Gygax wanted to place on Oerth. Frank Mentzer, Creative Consultant at TSR at the time, wrote four RPGA tournament adventures taken from his home campaign setting of Acquaria (published by TSR as the first four of the R-series modules: R1 To the Aid of Falx, R2 The Investigation of Hydell, R3 The Egg of the Phoenix, and R4 Doc's Island). Mentzer envisioned them as the first part of a new Aqua-Oeridian campaign set somewhere on Oerth outside of the Flanaess.

By the time the 1983 edition was published, Gygax was in Hollywood on a semi-permanent basis, approving scripts for the Saturday morning Dungeons & Dragons cartoon series and trying to land a deal for a D&D movie. Without his day-to-day guidance, many of these projects never appeared.

== Setting updates ==
After Gygax was forced out of TSR at the end of 1985 and lost all rights to development of Greyhawk, many subsequent works by TSR, and later Wizards of the Coast, updated or modified the original information. The most significant of these included:

- The 1988 hardcover book Greyhawk Adventures
- The 1992 boxed set From the Ashes
- The 1998 sourcebook Greyhawk: The Adventure Begins (winner of the 1996 Origins Award for Best Roleplaying Supplement)
- The 2000 sourcebook Living Greyhawk Gazetteer
