= Needle (module) =

- Code: I11
- TSR product code: 9187
- Rules required: AD&D (1st Edition)
- Character levels: 8 - 10
- Campaign setting: Generic
- Authors: Frank Mentzer
- First published: 1987

Linked modules
- I1, I2, I3, I4, I5, I6, I7, I8, I9, I10, I11, I12, I13, I14

Needle (I11) is a Dungeons & Dragons module. Author: Frank Mentzer (1987).

== Plot summary ==
Needle is an adventure in which the player characters recover a magical obelisk from a distant jungle, and which turns out to be a door to another world.

In this adventure, the player characters volunteer for a king to explore a dense jungle that was once home to a great civilization, with a magic obelisk at its center. In Part 1, Ruins of Empire, the party travels to the jungle and explores the ruins. In Part 2, Retrieval, the party leads a team hampered by disease and jungle animals to transport the obelisk to the king. In Part 3, The Powers That Be, assuming the party is successful, the obelisk is placed in its new position, where it reveals a gate to another world.

=== Table of contents ===
Chapter	Page
Introduction	2
Native Life	3
Non-Player Characters	6
New and Adapted Monsters	8
Part 1 - Ruins of Empire	10
Part 2 - Retrieval	27
Part 3 - The Powers That Be	37

=== Notable nonplayer characters ===
- Montana: 8th level fighter
- Digger: 5th level fighter/8th level thief
- Torgel: 13th level magic-user

== Publication history ==
I11 Needle was written by Frank Mentzer, with a cover by Clyde Caldwell and interior illustrations by Doug Chaffee, and was published by TSR in 1987 as a 48-page booklet with two outer folders.

=== Credits ===
Design: Frank Mentzer
Developer: Frank Mentzer
Editing: Barbara Young
Cover Art: Clyde Caldwell
Illustrations: Doug Chaffee
Cartography: Dave Sutherland
Typesetting: Betty Elmore and Kim Lindau

Distributed to the book trade in the United States by Random House, Inc., and in Canada by Random House of Canada, Ltd. Distributed to the toy and hobby trade by regional distributors. Distributed in the United Kingdom by TSR UK Ltd.

product number 9187
ISBN 0-88038-386-0

== See also ==
- List of Dungeons & Dragons modules
