= Desert of Desolation =

Dungeons & Dragons adventure module

Pharaoh
- The cover of the Pharaoh module, with art by Jim Holloway. The artwork depicts the ghostly pharaoh Amun-Re motioning towards his tomb.
- Code: I3-5
- Rules required: Advanced Dungeons & Dragons 1st edition
- Character levels: 5–7
- Authors: Tracy & Laura Hickman
- First published: 1983

Linked modules
- I1, I2, I3, I4, I5, I6, I7, I8, I9, I10, I11, I12, I13, I14

Desert of Desolation is a compilation adventure module published by TSR for the Dungeons & Dragons (D&D) fantasy roleplaying game. It combines three previously published individual modules: Pharaoh, Oasis of the White Palm, and Lost Tomb of Martek. The modules were made for use with the first edition Advanced Dungeons & Dragons (AD&D) rules. Pharaoh was created by Tracy and Laura Hickman soon after the couple married in 1977, and published by TSR in 1982. Oasis of the White Palm was a collaboration between Tracy Hickman and Philip Meyers, and Hickman wrote the Lost Tomb of Martek on his own; both were printed in 1983.

Each module is an Egyptian-styled adventure. The individual modules were well received by critics at the time of their release, and the compilation garnered accolades in the early 2000s.

== Plot summary ==
=== Pharaoh ===
Pharaoh is an Egyptian-styled adventure that includes a pyramid map and a trap-filled maze.

=== Oasis of the White Palm ===
Oasis of the White Palm is an adventure in which the player characters come to the Oasis of the White Palm to find out that Shadalah, intended bride of the eldest son of the sheikh, has been kidnapped. The sheikh suspects that his enemies are holding her somewhere within the oasis. The PCs must solve the mystery before they can progress further. After the characters establish contacts at the oasis, they must go to the temple of Set and then the crypt of Badr al-Mosak, and the adventure will finish in the city of Phoenix; there, the PCs must acquire the three Star Gems (the one from Amun-Re's tomb in the previous adventure and two more introduced here) and set the djinni free if they plan to move on to the next module. The Oasis of the White Palm module contains wilderness maps, and also includes a number of smaller adventures.

=== Lost Tomb of Martek ===
The goal of the PCs is the tomb of the millennium-dead wizard Martek. The tomb can be found in the immense Desert of Desolation, and most of the action in the adventure happens inside the enormous tomb of Martek. The player characters have to traverse a sea of glass using skate-ships, and then go through the Crystal Prism and the Mobius Tower to get to the final crypt. The adventure is organized into seven parts, taking the party from the desert through a number of planes on their way to the Citadel of Martek. They must use the Star Gems to revive the dead wizard. When they have done so, he lets them choose from a variety of magical treasure, and leaves to defeat the Efreet.

== Publication history ==
In 1977, Tracy Hickman and Laura Hickman (co-creators of the Dragonlance campaign setting) were married. Soon after, while living in Provo, Utah, they wrote the adventures Pharaoh and Ravenloft. The Hickmans privately published their first two adventures, Rahasia and Pharaoh, which earned them a local reputation. DayStar West Media Productions published Pharaoh as part of the "Night Ventures" line of adventure scenarios in 1980, as a sixty-eight-page book. Tracy was working with a business associate who left the Hickmans to cover thirty-thousand dollars in bad checks, driving them to declare bankruptcy, and Tracy Hickman decided to sell their adventure modules to TSR, "literally so that I could buy shoes for my children". TSR decided to buy the modules, and also hired Tracy as a game designer:

"They said it would be easier to publish my adventures if I was part of the company. So, we made the move from Utah to Wisconsin."

In 1982, TSR published Pharaoh as a thirty-two-page booklet with two outer folders, for the first edition of AD&D. It was designed for 6-8 player characters of levels 5–7, and formed the first of the three-part Desert of Desolation module series.

Oasis of the White Palm is the sequel to the Pharaoh module. TSR published this adventure in 1983 as a thirty-two-page booklet with two outer folders, and the adventure was written by Tracy Hickman and Philip Meyers with cover art by Jim Holloway and interior illustrations by Keith Parkinson. It was intended for 6 to 8 characters of levels 6–8. Lost Tomb of Martek is the third module in the series, and was designed by Tracy Hickman, for 7th-9th level characters. Lost Tomb of Martek was published in 1983 as a 32-page booklet with two outer folders.

The compilation module Desert of Desolation was printed in 1987. The compilation features a cover by Keith Parkinson. It features additional design and revision work by The Companions team members Peter Rice and William John Wheeler on the I3, I4, and I5 AD&D game adventures. Wheeler attempted to expand on the originals, without altering their tone. The adventures in Desert of Desolation are designed for a 5th-10th level party and have been refitted to take place in the Forgotten Realms setting, and also made compatible with the rules in the Wilderness Survival Guide. Rice and Wheeler added more background material, and included staging tips for the Dungeon Master. The details of various elements that had been open-ended elements were spelled out. Desert of Desolation includes a 128-page adventure booklet, a sixteen-page maps booklet, and a large A1 size sheet containing maps and player handouts. The compilation module contains new maps, including an isometric map depicting the tomb of Amun-Re. The revision also introduces ancient inscriptions that the players can decipher.

At the time these modules were released, each D&D module was marked with an alphanumeric code indicating the series to which it belonged. The earlier modules have module codes I3, I4, and I5 respectively, and the combined module's code is I3–5

== Reception ==
The modules were well received by critics, both separately and as a compilation. Called "The definitive "Egyptian-themed" D&D adventure", it was ranked the 6th greatest adventure of all time by Dungeon in 2004. Christopher Perkins noted that "This adventure introduced a new encounter format later adapted for third edition adventures," serving as the precursor to the format Dungeon would use for third edition. Chris Pramas felt the backstory made the adventure "so much more interesting than the typical dungeon bash, and the whole series dripped with atmosphere."

Pharaoh and Oasis of the White Palm were reviewed in White Dwarf, No. 45 by Jim Bambra, who gave both modules 10 of out 10 overall. Bambra felt that the presentation of both modules was excellent, and liked the new format, which utilized a short paragraph to quickly describe how the adventure should be run. He felt that this system, which also included distinct listings of traps, tricks, monsters, and treasure, "makes it far easier to find information quickly and reduced the chance of leaving something important out in the heat of play." While Bambra was disappointed with I1 Dwellers of the Forbidden City, he felt that with I2 Tomb of the Lizard King and these two modules "the I series is fast becoming one of the best available". Bambra concluded by stating that these "are both excellent adventures, they are imaginative, colourful and challenging. If I5 The Lost Tomb of Martek is as good as these two the Desert series will be one of the best yet ranking with the G and D modules."

Doug Cowie reviewed Oasis of the White Palm for Imagine magazine, and stated that "This is an excellent, varied module. It has excitement, depth and tension. A must for those who have played 13 and highly recommended for anyone else."

Lost Tomb of Martek received a positive review (9 out of 10) from Dave Morris in issue No. 55 of White Dwarf magazine. Morris felt the module met the high standards one would expect from Tracy Hickman. He complimented the "fun with spacetime distortion", the Mobius Tower, and the Guilders and Maddogs—dimwitted inbred descendants of rogues and paladins, respectively, who became trapped in the tomb over many centuries. According to Morris, "There is the sense throughout this adventure that the characters are agents of destiny, heroes fulfilling a chain of events set in motion long ages ago—the author has succeeded admirably in creating this effect". Morris compared this module to Temple of Death, feeling that both are excellent adventures for characters of roughly the same level, but that while the characters would have to retire after the world-shattering adventure in Lost Tomb of Martek, the campaign would not necessarily have to end after playing Temple of Death.

Doug Cowie reviewed Lost Tomb of Martek for Imagine magazine. He noted the module's attractive cover, but found the internal illustrations to be of low quality even though they were at times helpful to understand tricky bits of text. Cowie's main problem was with the "purple" prose of the descriptions to be read aloud by the DM to the players. He doubted that many gamemasters would use them as given. Overall, Cowie thought the module to be of "praiseworthy detail" and "so well designed [he] couldn't help liking it".

Jim Bambra reviewed the Desert of Desolation compilation release for White Dwarf No. 93, calling it "more than a simple repackaging of the three original adventures... The adventure material itself has received considerable expansion." Bambra praised the adventure, stating:

"These adventures are classic stuff and have stood the test of time well. They mix roleplaying, wilderness and dungeon adventuring in an entertaining and intriguing way. While the roleplaying is fun, and the wilderness adventures certainly have the feel of being in a dry and dusty desert, it is the dungeon adventure sections which really shine. These are some of the best TSR has ever produced—they include tricks, traps, and combat, all the stuff associated with dungeons. But more importantly, they are connected by an epic storyline which really catches the flavour of the Arabian Nights."

Bambra liked the wall inscriptions in the pharaoh's tomb as part of the revised adventure, feeling that they add to the adventure and give the players some insight into what is going on: "They also pose an interesting problem, as they first need to be deciphered. Although written in English, their meanings are cunningly disguised, so some thought will be required to interpret them correctly." He felt that the "adventurers must rely on their roleplaying skills to deal with the problems facing them" at the Oasis of the White Palm, and that once they figure out the mystery of the place "the action really hots up and in more ways than one!" Bambra described the last part of the adventure as "Another dungeon, but a very interesting one." Bambra concluded his review by stating "These are easily the best of TSR's reprint series."

Desert of Desolation was reviewed in Dragon No. 126 by Ken Rolston. According to Rolston, "Tracy Hickman... is a first-rate designer, and these modules are exceptional examples of the module genre... The original modules were nifty dungeons, with lots of puzzles, monsters, and colorful encounters." Rolston felt that the compilation module was a bit too heavy for his taste, "densely packed with information, built around a very linear narrative, and consisting, for the most part, of dungeon crawls—well, it makes slow going, and the writing style of the revision is pretty wordy". He also felt that the old-fashioned graphic design did not help the adventure's pacing and readability. Rolston concluded his review by stating "The original I3–I5 modules were pretty exciting in their time. In this revised version, they still count as classic AD&D game adventures. But exciting? I'm afraid not."

Scott Taylor of Black Gate in 2015 rated the Desert of Desolation series as #6 in "The Top 10 Campaign Adventure Module Series of All Time, saying "the series still stands up today as an easily playable desert campaign that will provide countless hours of enjoyment."
