= Baltron's Beacon =

Dungeons & Dragons adventure module

- Code: I7
- TSR product code: 9152
- Rules required: AD&D (1st Edition)
- Character levels: 4 - 8
- Authors: Philip Meyers
- First published: 1985

Linked modules
- I1, I2, I3, I4, I5, I6, I7, I8, I9, I10, I11, I12, I13, I14

Baltron's Beacon is an adventure module published in 1985 for the Advanced Dungeons & Dragons fantasy role-playing game.

== Plot summary ==
Baltron's Beacon is an adventure in which the player characters are hired to find a substance known as "black flame" in a ruined tower in a swamp.

== Publication history ==
I7 Baltron's Beacon was written by Philip Meyers, with a cover by Larry Elmore, and was published by TSR in 1985 as a 32-page booklet with an outer folder.
