= The Immortal Storm (module) =

Dungeons & Dragons adventure module

- Code: IM1
- TSR product code: 9171
- Authors: Frank Mentzer
- First published: 1986

The Immortal Storm is a 1986 adventure module for the Immortals Rules expansion to the Basic Rules of the Dungeons & Dragons fantasy role-playing game.

== Plot summary ==
The Immortal Storm is an adventure scenario intended for novice Immortal-level player characters. Immortals coming from the five different spheres of power (matter, energy, thought, time, and entropy) must stop a cosmic storm by undertaking a quest through the planes to obtain the Key to Eternity.

A supernatural storm threatens the entire multiverse. Mysteriously, a supernatural eye in the center of the storm watches the Hierarchs, who cannot dissipate the storm. Nix, the Hierarch of Entropy, recruits the player characters to help them destroy the malignant maelstrom that poses a threat to all of space and time. At last, the eye gives the Hierarchs a puzzle, which they use to test the player characters to determine their fitness for the quest. By solving the puzzle, characters learn their roles in the quest. Having solved the puzzle themselves, the Hierarchs impart this knowledge to characters regardless of their performance.

The party then seeks necessary items in the planes; searches in New York and Chicago precede the climax. When the characters visit the plane of technology, their Immortals powers do not help them. At the conclusion, the characters guard the Hierarchs as they destroy the storm.

== Publication history ==
The Immortal Storm is a 40-page booklet with an outer folder, published in 1986. It was written by Frank Mentzer, with cover art by Larry Elmore and interior art by Valerie Valusek and Larry Elmore. This module was the first adventure produced for the D&D Immortals Rules set, and was intended for a party of Novice Temporal player characters, the lowest Immortal level.

== Reception ==
In his review for White Dwarf, Graeme Davis compared the premises of The Immortal Storm and Star Trek: the Motion Picture, noting logical flaws: "everybody knows Our Heroes will get the mission no matter how badly they do [on the test]"; the storm lists the things needed to destroy it. Davis found the different planes' presentation imaginative, despite a plane consisting entirely of music staves and populated by sentient musical notes that "smacks more of Dr. Seuss than D&D". He further criticized the air-filled tunnels in the Plane of Earth that help its inhabitants move about, and ridicules the adventure's climax: "Our Heroes happen to need something from this humble little plane of ours, and as everybody knows, if it's vital to the survival of the multiverse, well gee whiz, it's just gotta be in the USA. I must admit, though, having an inter-planar gate on the New York subway might explain a thing or two." Davis felt that newly-Immortal characters' powers were "severely wasted by sending them on a trip down the shops. I'm sure that it would have been possible to come up with something a little more grand in scale for the first Immortals module." He claimed to sense a hurried quality about the module's production, concluding that "the module does have its moments, but my overall impression was one of disappointment".

Tom Zunder reviewed The Immortal Storm for the British magazine Adventurer #6 (January 1987). He commented on the cover art, recalling the cover of Day of Al'Akbar, saying "here we at last have a sexy elf and a hunky bloke to go with the bosom brigade. Can't really complain about this cover too much really, the molten lava they walk around in almost-naked does after all give a hint as to the magnitude of adventure to expect. This is, after all, the first of the Immortal scenario packs, and we're all expecting something rather epic. We are not to be disappointed". He commented on the scope of the adventure: "A solution of riddles, the Immortals game takes D&D to its ultimate conclusion, magic and technology become truly intermingled in the mechanics of D&D sorcery. The strange thing is, that when [player characters] can transfer across the planes, pluck starfire from flaming suns and use wishes like ship computers, it all becomes absolutely excellent fun. The setting is so cosmic, it's a totally different game, and a very appealing one." He called the Immortals' visit to the "dour" plane of technology "one of the best bits of the adventure" and noted that "New York City is a dangerous place for stranded Immortals". Zunder concluded the review by saying: "Frank Mentzer has come up with a really good one here, a scenario so far beyond Basic D&D as to really be a totally different game and setting altogether. I wasn't expecting to enjoy this, but I found the ideas really good fun and was tempted to go and play the game really and properly.... I guess that's a yes for the Immortal D&D owners, and a suggestion to the lower levels that they might skip the intermediate stuff altogether and have an ogle at this little lot".
