= Swords of the Iron Legion =

Dungeons & Dragons adventure module

- Code: I14
- TSR product code: 9226
- Rules required: AD&D (1st Edition), Battlesystem
- Character levels: 1 - 15+
- Campaign setting: Forgotten Realms
- Authors: Edited by Skip Williams
- First published: 1988

Linked modules
- I1, I2, I3, I4, I5, I6, I7, I8, I9, I10, I11, I12, I13, I14

Swords of the Iron Legion is an adventure module published in 1988 for the Dungeons & Dragons fantasy role-playing game.

== Plot summary ==
Swords of the Iron Legion is a collection of 11 short Forgotten Realms adventure scenarios, including some designed for Battlesystem.

== Publication history ==
I14 Swords of the Iron Legion was edited by Skip Williams, with a cover by Larry Elmore, and was published by TSR in 1988 as a 64-page book.
