= House of Strahd =

D&D module

- Character levels: 6-13
- First published: 1993

House of Strahd is an adventure module for the 2nd edition of the Advanced Dungeons & Dragons fantasy role-playing game, published in 1993.

== Plot summary ==
In House of Strahd, the player characters are stranded in Barovia, and must breach a haunted castle and destroy its master, the vampire-wizard Strahd von Zarovich. Elements that made the original Ravenloft module are still present, such as Madame Eva, the mysterious gypsy fortuneteller, Strahd's variable objectives (determined randomly, so the adventure can be replayed), and the deadly catacombs with the moving black ceiling. The revision introduces some new creatures (meld monsters, gargoyle golems), develops Strahd's tactics (with sections labeled "Strahd's Opportunities" that suggest attack routines triggered by the party's actions), and adds a Time-Track Table (so the referee can anticipate the sunset).

== Publication history ==
TSR published House of Strahd (module code RM4) in 1993. It was updated from the I6 Ravenloft module to include rules from the second edition of Advanced Dungeons & Dragons. The module credits the original work by Tracy Hickman and Laura Hickman, but was revised by Bruce Nesmith, who along with Andria Hayday created the Ravenloft campaign setting. The module consisted of one 64-page book, and one 32" x 21" map sheet. Editing was by Richard W. Brown, with a cover by Dana M. Knutson and illustrations by Clyde Caldwell and James Crabtree.

== Reception ==
Rick Swan reviewed House of Strahd for Dragon magazine #205 (May 1994). He said that House of Strahd for the Ravenloft setting was the "best thing to come flapping out for this setting in many a moon", declaring the original 1983 classic I6 Ravenloft module one of the finest adventures and that "the re-issue improves on the original". He called Strahd's castle, consisting of almost 100 rooms, "an architectural masterpiece, as opulent as it is creepy" and the main villain a "high-level necromancer of incomparable cunning, Strahd holds his own with Count Dracula as one of horror's most memorable bloodsuckers". Swan felt that the "elements that made the original so much fun" were still there, but it was the updating "that pushes the revised version over the top" and notes that Nesmith "touched up the descriptions, clipping the clutter and beefing up the sensory details". Swan suggested that House of Strahd "may be impossible to beat", and related that he had "played it three times (twice in its original version) and haven't come close. But, as with the best Call of Cthulhu adventures, winning is incidental to the scenery and the scares. Your party may bite the dust, but they'll be smiling when they do." Swan concluded his review by stating: "Flawlessly staged and breathtakingly suspenseful, House of Strahd should be a part of every Ravenloft campaign, even if it means the demise of beloved PCs (which it well might). If you've resisted the Ravenloft setting so far, here's all the excuse you need to get on board."

Gene Alloway reviewed the product in a 1994 issue of White Wolf. He rated the game at 2 of 5 for Concepts, a 3 for Complexity and Value, and a 4 for Appearance and Playability. He stated that it is "solid and enjoyable" but provided an underwhelming update. He gave it an overall rating of 3.5.

One criticism of this module is that, since it was printed as part of the Ravenloft campaign setting, many pertinent details are not reprinted from the boxed set, making it rather difficult to run House of Strahd as a stand-alone adventure.
