= Adventure Pack I =

D&D module

- Code: I13
- TSR product code: 9202
- Rules required: AD&D (1st Edition)
- Campaign setting: Generic
- Authors: Edited by Deborah Christian
- First published: 1987

Linked modules
- I1, I2, I3, I4, I5, I6, I7, I8, I9, I10, I11, I12, I13, I14

Adventure Pack I is an adventure module published in 1987 for the Advanced Dungeons & Dragons fantasy role-playing game. It contains a variety of adventure scenarios written by different authors, and received mostly positive reviews.

== Plot summary ==
Adventure Pack I is a collection including eight adventure scenarios and three short scenarios, such as investigating a mystery involving a magical circus (written by Warren Spector), a conflict occurring between warring assassins (written by Steve Perrin), and travelling to a spinning castle in the sky belonging to a dying storm giant (written by Jennell Jaquays (Note: Credited as Paul Jaquays.)). The adventures average 8-10 pages in length, and are intended for character levels 4–10.

The individual scenarios are titled "Blood and Laurels", "The Circus of Gandolfo", "The House of Long Knives", "The Lauros Road Bandits", "Reign of Triumph", "Scavenger Hunt", "Sharla's Zoo", "Steaks", "Terror in Skytumble Tor", "To Kill A Kraken" and "The Weird Woods of Baron Orchid".

== Publication history ==
Adventure Pack I was edited by Deborah Christian with cover art by Jeff Easley; it was published by TSR in 1987 as a 96-page book. The list of authors includes: Steve Perrin, Anne Gray McCready, Warren Spector and Jennell Jaquays.

== Reception ==
In his review for Adventure Pack I for White Dwarf No. 92, Graeme Davis said, "I'm confused over why this product is called I13 rather than REF5; it certainly has more in common with the two Books of Lairs than with any of the Desert of Desolation adventures". Of the adventures, he said that "some are thinly-disguised monster bashes, whilst others rely on thought and subtlety. Some look like Book of Lairs ideas which grew in the writing, and some are not so easily classified." Davis concluded by noting that the adventures were designed to be used at any point in a game, and were generally long enough for a single evening of play. He added that the styles of the scenarios were so varied that they might not all suit a group's play style, but said, "However, even so I13 is worth a look if you play a lot of AD&D and like to have fill-in adventures handy."

Ken Rolston briefly reviewed Adventure Pack I for Dragon magazine No. 129 (January 1988). Rolston called it "a good collection of short, stand-alone AD&D game adventures by a number of established and promising designers". He felt the plots, tones, and flavors of the adventures were particularly original and offbeat. His favorites were "Steaks" by Allen Varney ("a compact, charming, nicely staged gaming vignette with a clever central plot device") and "Terror in Skytumble Tor" by Jennell Jaquays ("a sharp little adventure with clever plot devices and vivid NPCs in a derelict sky castle that is ponderously tumbling end-over-end toward the earth"). Rolston felt that while reading long modules could be rather dull, these short adventures were a good length. He considered them long enough to present an idea, but short enough to read straight through without getting bored, and "the varied tones — some light and clever, some earnest and heroic — make for a more pleasant reading experience". He concluded that "the adventures here are comfortably conventional in their AD&D game feel, and can easily be slipped into a typical house campaign".

Lawrence Schick, in his 1991 book Heroic Worlds, calls the storm giant scenario by Jennell Jaquays "a gem".
