= Curse of Strahd =

D&D 5e adventure module

- Rules required: Dungeons & Dragons 5th edition
- Character levels: 1–10
- Authors: Jeremy Crawford, Laura Hickman, Tracy Hickman, Adam Lee, Christopher Perkins, Richard Whitters
- First published: March 15, 2016
- ISBN: 978-0786965984

Curse of Strahd is an adventure book for the 5th edition of the Dungeons & Dragons role-playing game. It was released on March 15, 2016 and is based on the Ravenloft module published in 1983.

== Contents ==
Adventurers are mysteriously drawn to the realm of Barovia which is surrounded by deadly mist and ruled by the vampire wizard Strahd von Zarovich. This gothic horror adventure takes the players on a course through Barovia that culminates with a vampire hunt inside Castle Ravenloft. Using a deck of tarokka cards, the Dungeon Master can randomize parts of the adventure such as the identity of a powerful ally, the placement of important magic items across Barovia, and Strahd's location within Castle Ravenloft. This adventure module is designed to take four to six player characters from 1st level to 10th level.

=== Curse of Strahd: Revamped ===
In addition to a softcover adventure book, the boxed set includes the following:

- The Creatures of Horror book, describing new monsters
- A tarokka deck and booklet
- A themed dungeon master's screen
- A double-sided poster-sized map of Barovia and Castle Ravenloft
- 12 postcards themed around locations in the adventure

== Publication history ==
Curse of Strahd was written by Jeremy Crawford, Laura Hickman, Tracy Hickman, Adam Lee, Christopher Perkins, Richard Whitters, and was published by Wizards of the Coast in 2016. It acts as an adaptation of the original Ravenloft module for the 5th edition of Dungeons & Dragons. Charlie Hall, for Polygon, explained that "Instead of reinventing the wheel, principle [sic] designer Chris Perkins brought in the module's original writers — the husband and wife team of Tracy and Laura Hickman — to create the very best version of the famous module yet. [...] Tracy and Laura have been hosting nearly annual sessions of the original Ravenloft at their home, for friends and family, over the course of decades. When Perkins asked for their input, they flew out to meet with the team. The result was a torrent of ideas for new locations, characters and encounters". On the development process, Perkins said: "Without the Hickmans, this project would've died on the vine" and that "the Hickmans envisioned Strahd differently than he's depicted in the original Ravenloft adventure. Their image didn't match the Bela Legosi [sic] vampire quite so much. Tracy found an old daguerreotype [an early type of photograph captured on a silvered copper plate] [sic] that captured the look of Strahd in his mind, and we used that image as a reference to create a new look for the vampire". The tarokka deck was released as a supplement by Gale Force 9.

=== Revamped edition ===
Revamped edition comes in a coffin-shaped display box.

In July 2020, Wizards of the Coast announced a new edition of the Curse of Strahd module, entitled Curse of Strahd: Revamped. It was released on October 20, 2020. This module is the first released with the publisher's new focus on diversity and inclusion. Wizards of the Coast stated that "the adventure includes the latest errata and a revised depiction of the Vistani" who are based on stereotypes about the Romani people. Beadle & Grimm, a Wizards of the Coast licensee, released a limited run special "Legendary Edition" which included physical props for the Dungeon Master to use such as handouts, maps, props and encounter cards.

Chris Perkins, Dungeon & Dragons Principal Narrative Designer, in an interview with IGN said, "We don't do a tremendous number of box sets. [...] It was always my wish that at some point we could put a version of the adventure together that actually had the cards with it, and it's out of that idea that this boxed set emerged. We did want to make sure that if Beadle and Grimm [a company that specializes in high-end D&D box sets like this one or this one] [sic], for instance, were doing their own version of it, we wouldn't eventually be duplicating what they would do. They tend to go [...] in the hundreds of dollars. So this is kind of filling in middle space between what they would normally do and what we would normally sell".

== Reception ==
Publishers Weekly included the book in their "Best-selling Books Week Ending March 28, 2016", in which Curse of Strahd was #6 in "Hardcover Fiction". The book was generally well received, earning the 2016 ENnie Awards for Best Adventure and Best Art/Cover and runner up for Product of the Year.

In 2016, Henry Glasheen, for SLUG Magazine, highlighted the legacy of the original Castle Ravenloft and wrote "Curse of Strahd carries on this legacy admirably, diving deeper into the bloody past of Count Strahd. Before you even get to the module itself, there is a whole section devoted to Strahd, his personality, and his goals in the adventure. [...] In fact, there really are no pre-scripted Strahd moments in the early stages of the adventure—only various opportunities for him to appear and test the party's mettle. In keeping with the logical structure of the original campaign, Curse of Strahd also finds countless ways to intertwine the larger themes of the campaign into its side adventures. There is, as always, a driving main quest that keeps the action moving forward, but each stop along the way brings moral and ethical dilemmas to the party—and Strahd is always watching, waiting to see which party members evidence a dark side that he can play off the others".

Rory Bristol, for GeekDad, wrote "Fair warning: the book features a lot of death, blood, and general horror. Descriptions and events can be too much for young kids, so beware running this campaign with little ones. For groups that ride the thrill of horror and intrigue, however, this is 100% the book for your party. [...] Reading through The Curse of Strahd was a thrilling visit to the tortured land of Barovia. As with many pre-written adventures for D&D, it was a bit like reading a choose-your-own-adventure book from front to back, rather than following the breadcrumbs. [...] Play is easy, and intuitive, given you've familiarized yourself with the adventure ahead of time. If the DM hasn't read the full adventure, be prepared for a bored party. There's too much intrigue to wing your way through this adventure".

In 2017, Cecilia D'Anastasio, for Kotaku, highlighted the inclusion of queer characters in Curse of Strahd and wrote "what was a scattering of queer characters throughout the years formalized into a guiding principle with 2016's Curse of Strahd, an adventure that has players take down the vampire Count Strahd. [...] Every adventure since Curse of Strahd has included one or several queer characters, and Crawford assured Kotaku that this will be a constant into future adventures [...]. Weaving queer plotlines into D&D games is not hard to do. A passing mention of a same-sex couple might be enough to assert that queer sexuality is a natural part of the D&D universe. And instead of relying on stereotypes or fixating on their sexuality, these characters' fleshed-out backstories make them people, not icons".

In a review of Curse of Strahd in Black Gate, Andrew Zimmerman Jones said "Curse of Strahd is really a mix of setting manual and adventure module in one, with a storyline that is extremely open-ended, with endings that (assuming the players survive) allow for continued adventures centered around the consequences of the players' actions in Castle Ravenloft."

=== Revamped edition ===
The new boxed set was included on The Mary Sue's 2020 "Gift Guide for the Dungeons & Dragons Fan". Christian Hoffer, for Comicbook, wrote "while it doesn't have enough extra material to justify a second purchase, Curse of Strahd Revamped is a great box set for the DM/player group that hasn't traveled to Ravenloft and wants to commit to the campaign with a grim flourish. The box set definitely will enhance your Curse of Strahd experience, and the box alone makes for a great display piece on top of your bookshelf or in the D&D corner of your room".

Julie Muncy, for Io9, criticized the "granular changes" to the Vistani people as not very extensive and that "while there's a real opportunity here to do better work—the aforementioned diversity pledge also mentioned future works that will feature the Vistani people and aim to complicate their depictions—starting that work with a fancy collector's edition feels less like a promise to do better and more like a victory lap". Muncy highlighted that the errata and the Revamped edition "sought to undo some of the harmful stereotyping of the Vistani people, along with revising the book's approach to a specific character's disability to avoid ableist stereotypes. [...] While modifications do fix things like the stereotyping of the Vistani people as 'uncivilized' and heavy drinkers, the module still gives the Vistani abilities to curse and hypnotize players or cast spells like Evil Eye, which, along with unrevised art that heavily conjures stereotyped imagery of the Romani, leans into tropes that suggest the Romani have mystical, dangerous powers, tropes that have been used in the past to target Romani for persecution".

Jon Ryan, for IGN, wrote "the updates to the adventure itself mostly consist of previously-published amendments to the book, such as tweaks to an additional character option or corrections of printing errors, but the most notable updates are to some items that were deemed insensitive or offensive after the original publishing [...]. It's worth noting that the book's illustrations of the Vistani still evoke Romani culture, and some players may still associate certain abilities (such as their ability to cast curses or hypnotize players using an 'Evil Eye') with outdated cultural stereotypes".
