= The Investigation of Hydell =

Dungeons & Dragons adventure module

- Code: R-2
- Authors: Frank Mentzer
- First published: 1982

The Investigation of Hydell is an adventure module published in 1982 for the Advanced Dungeons & Dragons fantasy role-playing game.

== Plot summary ==
The Investigation of Hydell is an adventure in which the player characters investigate a slave trading organization.

== Publication history ==
R-2 The Investigation of Hydell was written by Frank Mentzer, with a cover by Jim Holloway, and published by TSR/RPGA in 1982 as a 16-page booklet with an outer folder. The module was a limited edition, and was only available for purchase to RPGA members. It was subsequently rewritten, and collected with the other modules from the R-series in I12 Egg of the Phoenix.
