= Ravenloft (module) =

1983 adventure module for the Dungeons & Dragons game

- The cover of the original Ravenloft module, with art by Clyde Caldwell. The artwork depicts villain Strahd von Zarovich atop Castle Ravenloft.
- Code: I6
- TSR product code: 9075
- Rules required: Advanced Dungeons & Dragons 1st edition
- Character levels: 5–7
- Campaign setting: Generic Advanced Dungeons & Dragons
- Authors: Tracy & Laura Hickman
- First published: 1983

Linked modules
- I1, I2, I3, I4, I5, I6, I7, I8, I9, I10, I11, I12, I13, I14

Ravenloft is an adventure module for the Dungeons & Dragons (D&D) fantasy role-playing game. The American game publishing company TSR, Inc. released it as a standalone adventure booklet in 1983 for use with the first edition Advanced Dungeons & Dragons game. It was written by Tracy and Laura Hickman, and includes art by Clyde Caldwell with maps by David Sutherland III. The plot of Ravenloft focuses on the villain Strahd von Zarovich, a vampire who pines for his lost love. Various story elements, including Strahd's motivation and the locations of magical weapons, are randomly determined by drawing cards. The player characters attempt to defeat Strahd and, if successful, the adventure ends.

The Hickmans began work on Ravenloft in the late 1970s, intent on creating a frightening portrait of a vampire in a setting that combined Gothic horror with the D&D game system. They play-tested the adventure with a group of players each Halloween for five years before it was published. Strahd has since appeared in a number of D&D accessories and novels. The module has inspired numerous revisions and adaptations, including a campaign setting of the same name and a sequel. In 1999, on the 25th anniversary of Dungeons & Dragons, two commemorative versions of Ravenloft were released.

Ravenloft has won one award, been included on two "best of" lists, and was generally well received by critics of its era. In 1984, it won the Strategists' Club Award for Outstanding Play Aid, and it appeared second in Dungeon magazine's list of the top 30 D&D adventures. Several reviewers liked the included maps, and White Dwarf magazine gave it 8 out of 10 overall. A Dragon magazine review praised the module, but felt that the D&D elements detracted from the Gothic horror atmosphere. In 2016, Wizards of the Coast published Curse of Strahd, an adaptation of the original Ravenloft module for the 5th edition of Dungeons & Dragons.

== Plot ==
The story involves a party of player characters (PCs) who travel to the land of Barovia, a small nation surrounded by a deadly magical fog. The master of nearby Castle Ravenloft, Count Strahd von Zarovich, tyrannically rules the country, and a prologue explains that the residents must barricade their doors each night to avoid attacks by Strahd and his minions. The Burgomaster's mansion is the focus of these attacks, and, for reasons that are not initially explained, Strahd is after the Burgomaster's adopted daughter, Ireena Kolyana.

Before play begins, the Dungeon Master (or DM, the player who organizes and directs the game play) randomly draws five cards from a deck of six. Two of these cards determine the locations of two magical weapons useful in defeating Strahd: the Holy Symbol and the Sunsword. The next two cards determine the locations of Strahd and the Tome of Strahd, a book that details Strahd's long-ago unrequited love. In this work, it is revealed that Strahd had fallen in love with a young girl, who in turn loved his younger brother. Strahd blamed his age for the rejection and made a pact with evil powers to live forever. He then slew his brother, but the young girl killed herself in response, and Strahd found that he had become a vampire. All possible locations are inside Castle Ravenloft.

The fifth and final card selected determines Strahd's motivation. There are four possible motivations for Strahd. He may want to replace one of the PCs and attempt to turn the character into a vampire and take on that character's form. He may desire the love of Ireena, whose appearance matches that of his lost love, Tatyana. Using mind control, Strahd will try to force a PC to attack Ireena and gain her love by "saving" her from the situation he created. Strahd may also want to create an evil magic item or destroy the Sunsword. If, during play, the party's fortune is told at the gypsy camp in Barovia, the random elements are altered to match the cards drawn by the gypsy.

As the party journeys through Barovia and the castle, the gameplay is guided using 12 maps with corresponding sections in the book's body guide. Example maps and sections include the Lands of Barovia, the Court of the Count, five entries for each level of the Spires of Ravenloft, and the Dungeons and Catacombs. Each location contains treasure and adversaries, including zombies, wolves, ghouls, ghosts, and other creatures. The main objective of the game is to destroy Count Strahd. The DM is instructed to play the vampire intelligently, and to keep him alive as long as possible, making him flee when necessary. In an optional epilogue, Ireena is reunited with her lover. They leave the "mortal world," as Ireena says, "Through these many centuries we have played out the tragedy of our lives."

== Publication background ==
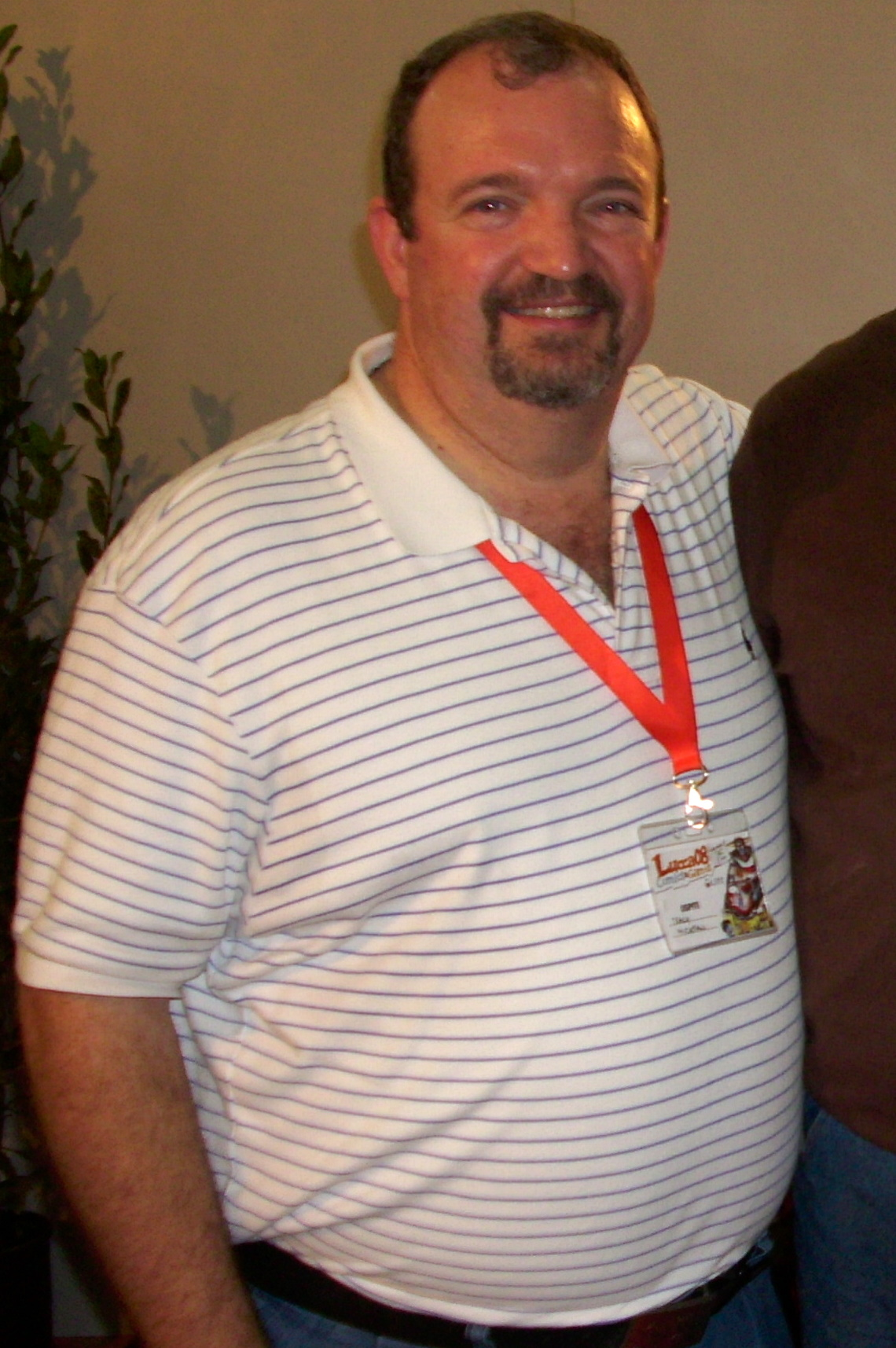
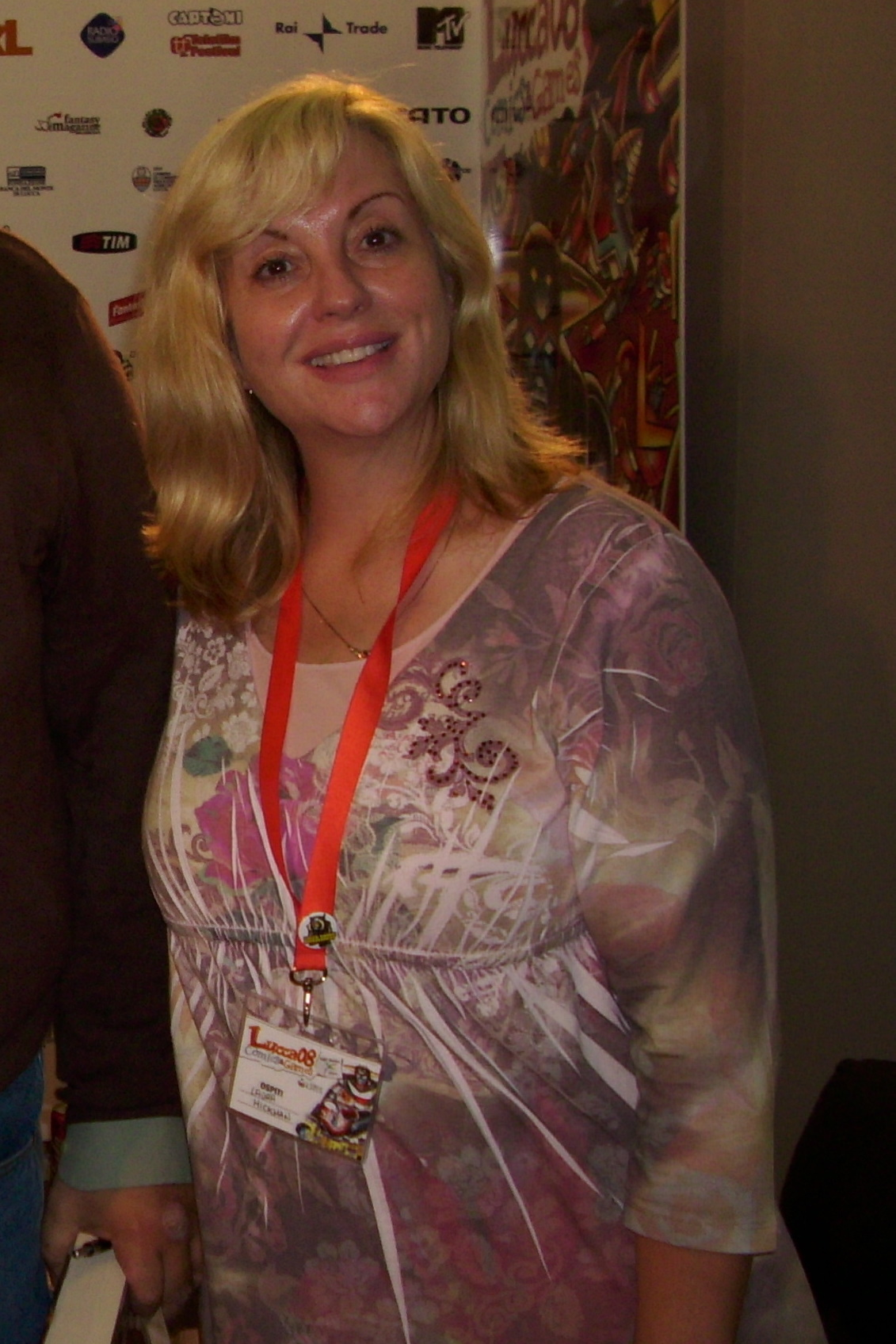
Tracy and Laura Hickman, designers of Ravenloft

Tracy Hickman and Laura Curtis married in 1977. Soon after, while living in Provo, Utah, they wrote the adventures Pharaoh and Ravenloft. When they began work on Ravenloft, they felt the vampire archetype had become overused, trite, and mundane, and decided to create a frightening version of the creature for the module. Ravenloft was inspired by Bram Stoker's Dracula and advertised as "a classic gothic story." They play-tested it with a group of players every Halloween for five years before it was published in 1983 by TSR. The plot combined elements of the horror genre with Dungeons & Dragons conventions for the first time. At the time of Ravenloft's release, each Dungeons & Dragons module was marked with an alphanumeric code indicating the series to which it belonged. Ravenloft was labeled I6: the sixth in a series of intermediate-level modules for the first edition of Advanced Dungeons & Dragons (AD&D). It consisted of a 32-page book, with separate maps that detailed locations in the adventure scenario.

Tracy Hickman once ran the adventure as a Dungeon Master. According to him, the experience was like an old scary movie, with "the obligatory castle high on the craggy cliff with the wolves howling in the woods. Sure enough, the vampire was up there in the castle. To most of the players, it seemed like a straightforward task: find the vampire and kill him." One player discovered Strahd's backstory and was so affected by it that when it came time to kill the vampire at the end of the adventure, despite having a sword capable of dispatching Strahd, he refused, and his companions were forced to complete the task. Afterwards, Hickman asked him why. "He deserved to die better than that," his friend said, to which Hickman replied, "Yes [...] But that is how it is with people who fall from greatness. He chose his end when he first chose to kill his brother. How could it be any different?".

According to a Wizards of the Coast article, Strahd has become one of the most infamous and well-known villains in the Dungeons & Dragons game, and he has appeared in a number of novels and rulebooks since his debut in Ravenloft. In an introduction to an online edition of Ravenloft II, author John D. Rateliff described Strahd as a then-unusual fusion of a monster with the abilities of a player character class; that is, a vampire magic-user. This design enables him to combine his own powers with the surrounding environment, making him a difficult opponent to defeat.

To celebrate the 25th anniversary of the Dungeons & Dragons game in 1999, two additional versions of the Ravenloft module were released. The first was a reprinting of the original adventure made available in the Dungeons & Dragons Silver Anniversary Collector's Edition boxed set, with slight modifications to make it distinguishable from the original (for collecting purposes). The second was the silver anniversary edition of Ravenloft that was adapted for use with the second edition Advanced Dungeons & Dragons (Wizards of the Coast periodically alters the rules of Dungeons & Dragons and releases a new version).

=== Ravenloft II: The House on Gryphon Hill ===
Ravenloft's success led to a sequel in 1986 titled Ravenloft II: The House on Gryphon Hill. Although Tracy Hickman was credited in Ravenloft II, he had left TSR before the module was completed. The writing was done by David "Zeb" Cook, Jeff Grubb, Harold Johnson, and Douglas Niles, following the Hickmans' outline. Each writer pursued a different section of the module in order to meet the deadline. Clyde Caldwell, who had done all of the art for the original Ravenloft module, provided the cover, but interior art was done by Jeff Easley. The adventure is designed for first edition Advanced Dungeons & Dragons characters of levels 8–10. The adventure was 48 pages, and included a large color map and an outer folder. It shared structural elements with the original, including variable NPC goals and variable locations for key objects, so that Gryphon Hill plays differently each time. The module's plot features an artifact known as The Apparatus that switches a monster's personality with that of an ordinary townsperson; player characters, therefore, are uncertain about the true identity of the people they meet. The module also introduces Azalin the lich, who later became a major character in the Ravenloft campaign setting. This module is playable alone or as a sequel to the original Ravenloft. The module describes the town of Mordentshire, as well as some haunted moors, and a manor house, all of which are mapped in perspective like the original module.

=== Adaptations ===
In 1986, Ravenloft was adapted into the gamebook Master of Ravenloft, #6 in the Advanced Dungeons & Dragons Adventure Gamebooks series. In the book, the reader plays the role of Jeren Sureblade, a paladin, who must defeat Count Strahd von Zarovich to save a young girl from becoming one of the undead. The gamebook was written by Jean Blashfield, with cover art by Clyde Caldwell and interior art by Gary Williams.

Ravenloft inspired a campaign setting of the same name, published in 1990. The Ravenloft: Realm of Terror boxed set was published as part of the second edition of Advanced Dungeons & Dragons and, according to its back cover, it is "rooted in the Gothic tradition" and contains "tips for adding fear to your games". The setting of the module was expanded; Ravenloft is now a demiplane (an alternate dimension). The boxed set's version of Strahd is similar to character in the original adventure, but his abilities were increased and his background explained in more detail. The campaign setting has produced a number of spin-offs, and this new version of Strahd was used as a major character in a number of novels.

The original Ravenloft module has been revised and expanded multiple times. In 1993, TSR published House of Strahd (module code RM4). It was updated to include rules from the second edition of Advanced Dungeons & Dragons. The module credits the original work by the Hickmans, but was revised by Bruce Nesmith, who along with Andria Hayday created the Ravenloft campaign setting. Nesmith introduced new monsters, made further developments on Strahd's tactics, and added a Time-Track Table to help the Dungeon Master plan for the sunset. In October 2006, Wizards of the Coast released an updated and expanded version of the original module for Dungeons & Dragons version 3.5 as a 226-page hardcover book entitled Expedition to Castle Ravenloft. It was based on the original module, and not the Ravenloft material made in the intervening years. Expedition to Castle Ravenloft is designed to be played as a mini-campaign lasting about 20 game sessions, much longer than the original module, although it contains options for running long 8-session or short 4-session adventures. The book also includes suggestions for incorporating the adventure into an existing generic setting, Forgotten Realms, Eberron or d20 Modern campaign. Wizards of the Coast released the board game Castle Ravenloft in 2010 as part of the "Adventure System" series of board games using a simplified 4th edition rule set. In 2016, Wizards of the Coast published Curse of Strahd, an adaptation of the original Ravenloft module for the 5th edition of Dungeons & Dragons, which was generally well received, earning the 2016 ENnie Awards for Best Adventure and Best Art/Cover and runner up for Product of the Year.

== Reception ==
Ravenloft won one award, and was included on two "best of" lists. In 1984, it won the Strategists' Club Award for Outstanding Play Aid. The book Dungeon Master For Dummies chose the module as one of the ten best classic adventures, saying it is "perhaps our favorite D&D adventure of all time", Ravenloft "takes the Dracula legend and gives it a D&D spin", and praised the detailed yet concise plot and isometric maps. The book also claims that Ravenloft "inspired game designers and Dungeon Masters to take the art of adventure to the next level."

In 2004, on the 30th anniversary of the Dungeons & Dragons game, Dungeon magazine ranked the module as the second greatest Dungeons & Dragons adventure of all time—behind Queen of the Spiders. The editor of Dungeon praised the placement of treasure, and Strahd's motivation was described as "a brilliant way to let fate drive the plot and evoke the mystery and mystique of Barovia". Bill Slavicsek, director of Wizards of the Coast's RPGs and Miniatures department, noted that it was the first adventure to "mix tone, story, and dungeon crawl" in a module, and game designer Andy Collins agreed. Clark Peterson, president of Necromancer Games, singled out the maps and Strahd for praise, saying the vampire is "perhaps one of the best villains of all time". Author John Rateliff also applauded the maps and the randomization, as well as Strahd's duality as a vampire/magic-user. The catacombs, where player characters were teleported away and replaced with undead wights, was singled out at as the adventure's "defining moment" by the magazine's editors.

Reviews for Ravenloft were generally positive. Rick Swan reviewed the adventure in The Space Gamer No. 72. He commented that there was "so much gothic atmosphere in Ravenloft that if it had any more, it'd flap its pages and fly away", and stated that the bulk of the adventure involving a search of Castle Ravenloft was "not too interesting" with encounters few and far between, and that the mechanic of using a regular deck of cards to simulate a gypsy fortune teller was "silly and the results are too arbitrary" but concluded that "Ravenloft is such a refreshing change that even with its problems, it's recommended." In the July 1984 issue of White Dwarf magazine, the module was given 8 out of 10 overall, with the reviewer mentioning its presentation as a positive, and its complexity as a negative. It was likened to a Hammer horror production and praised as enjoyable, although the reviewer said the game's puns were tedious and detracted from the spooky atmosphere. White Dwarf reviewer Dave Morris said it "should be a lot of fun – 'light, relief' of a nerve-wracking and deadly sort" and concluded that Ravenloft is "full of clever touches", and "features some first-class illustration and graphics". In a review for the January 1984 issue of Dragon magazine (published by a subsidiary of TSR), game designer Ken Rolston argued that, despite its design innovations, Ravenloft was still in essence a dungeon-style adventure. Rolston praised the randomization, the maps, and the player text (which is read aloud to the players by the DM). He said the player text "consistently develops an atmosphere of darkness and decay." Despite this, Rolston felt that the adventure has trouble in developing a frightening tone. He singles out its use of common monsters in D&D, an abundance of traps, and frequent combat interludes as elements that detract from the adventure's spookiness by interrupting the module's flow. Ultimately, he felt that in "AD&D terms it is a masterpiece", but not a work of "Gothic horror". In a Polygon article from 2021, Charlie Hall wrote that the original Ravenloft "has been criticized as derivative–and for reinforcing harmful stereotypes," but that it had an interesting conflicted villain. Tracy Hickman stated in 1998, "I still believe the original Ravenloft modules were perhaps the best that ever had my name on them."

Scott Taylor for Black Gate in 2014 listed Ravnloft by Clyde Caldwell as #7 in The Top 10 TSR Cover Paintings of All Time.
