= Dwellers of the Forbidden City =

Dungeons & Dragons adventure module

- The cover of Dwellers of the Forbidden City, with art by Erol Otus. The artwork depicts a battle between bullywugs (left) and player characters.
- Code: I1
- TSR product code: 9046
- Rules required: Advanced Dungeons & Dragons 1st edition
- Character levels: 4-7
- Campaign setting: Greyhawk
- Authors: David Cook
- First published: 1981
- Pages: 28
- ISBN: 0-935696-33-4

Linked modules
- I1, I2, I3, I4, I5, I6, I7, I8, I9, I10, I11, I12, I13, I14

Dwellers of the Forbidden City is an adventure module, or pre-packaged adventure booklet, ready for use by Dungeon Masters in the Dungeons & Dragons (D&D) fantasy role-playing game. The adventure was first used as a module for tournament play at the 1980 Origins Game Fair, and was later published by TSR in 1981 for use with the first edition Advanced Dungeons & Dragons rules. The module was written by game designer David "Zeb" Cook, who partly ascribes his hiring by TSR to his work on this module. In the adventure, the characters are hired to recover a stolen object from a hidden oriental-style city ruled by a snake-worshipping cult of yuan-ti and their mongrelmen and tasloi servants.

The module was ranked as the 13th greatest Dungeons & Dragons adventure of all time by Dungeon magazine for the 30th anniversary of the Dungeons & Dragons game in 2004.

== Plot summary ==
The adventure begins when the player characters hear reports of bandits waylaying and attacking caravans in a jungle region. Most of the ambushed merchants and guards have been killed, but the few who have returned alive tell fantastic stories about deformed plants and deadly beasts in the jungle. The stolen goods taken from the caravans provide an impetus for the characters to enter the jungles in search of this lost treasure.

After a long and perilous journey, the player characters encounter some friendly native people and are invited to stay in their village. The characters learn from the village's chief about the dangers of creatures called the yuan-ti and their servants, the tasloi, and that these creatures recently kidnapped the chief's son, taking him into the jungle. The chief and village shaman tell the player characters about a "forbidden city" in the jungle which they believe houses the ghosts of the enemies they have killed, and they supply the characters with guides to show the party the way to this forbidden city.

The adventuring environment in this module allows for both action and intrigue. The player characters can recruit allies from the various power groups and factions within the city, namely the bugbears, mongrelmen, and bullywugs, or else help pit these factions against each other for their own benefit.

== Publication history ==
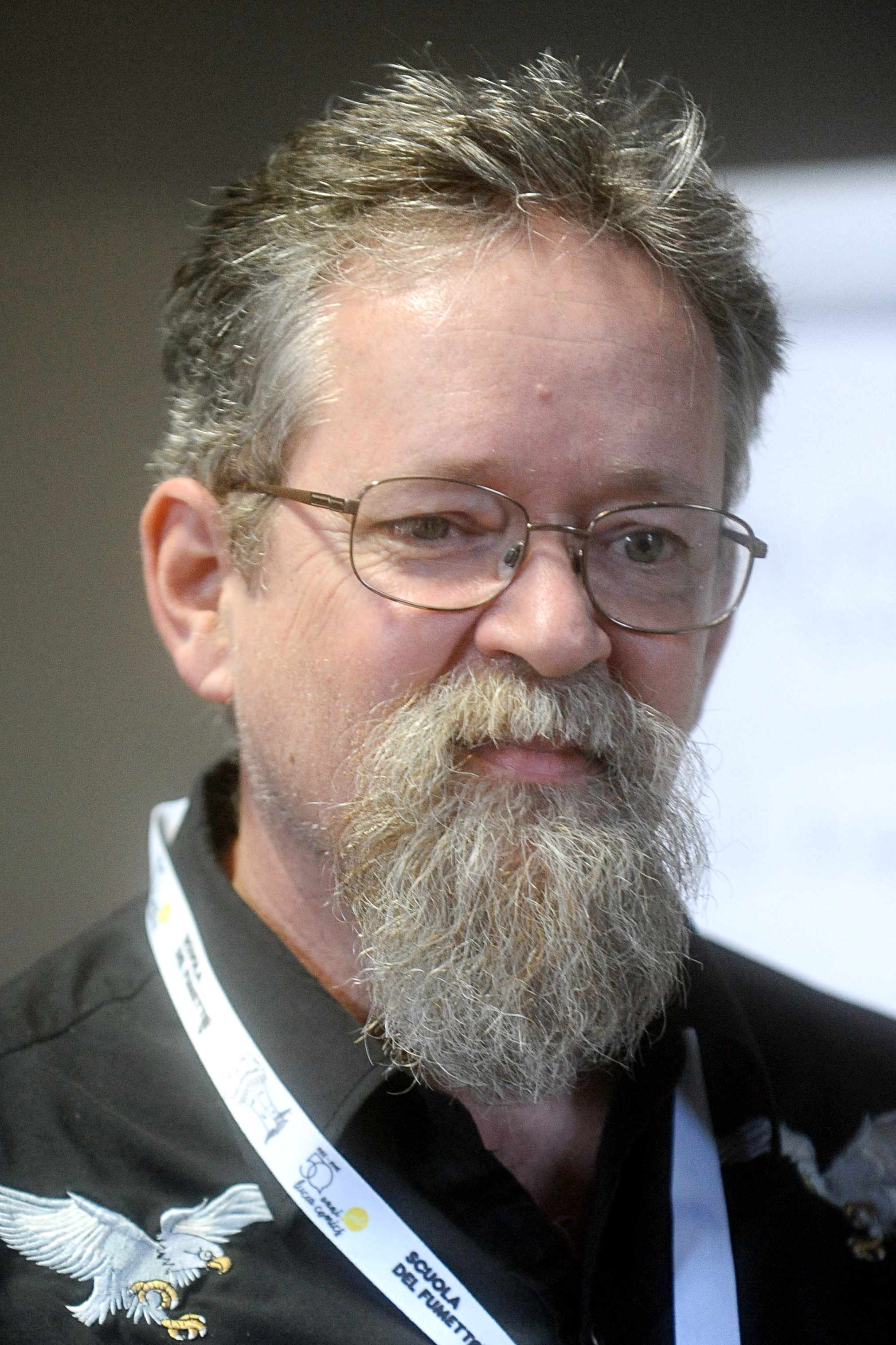
The adventure was designed by David Cook (pictured in 2016).

Dwellers of the Forbidden City was first used in Dungeons & Dragons tournament play at the Origins Game Fair in 1980. The module was published in 1981 by TSR for the first edition of the Advanced Dungeons & Dragons rules, and consisted of a 32-page booklet with an outer folder. The module was written by David "Zeb" Cook, with cover art by Erol Otus and interior art by James Holloway, Jim Roslof, Harry Quinn, and Stephen D. Sullivan.

Dwellers of the Forbidden City is the first of the mostly unrelated and unconnected Intermediate series (I-series) of modules designed for characters at between 4th and 8th levels. The module was originally intended to bear the code S4, but the code was reassigned to The Lost Caverns of Tsojcanth before Dwellers was published. As published, the adventure bears the code I1. It was one of the first adventures written by Cook, and he attributed TSR hiring him after he submitted an early version of the module. Cook would become the lead designer for the second edition of the AD&D rules, which debuted in 1989, and years later, he became the lead designer on the City of Villains MMORPG.

The adventure was instrumental in introducing the yuan-ti as a new species of antagonists. Much like the drow from the Queen of the Spiders Series, the yuan-ti have been featured in a number of 1st, 2nd and 3rd Edition books for the D&D game, and are one of the few species that Wizards of the Coast did not keep open for the Open Game License. The yuan-ti have also been expanded from their introduction in this module to other game worlds, in particular the Forgotten Realms campaign setting. Other new monsters introduced to the game through this module include the aboleth, mongrelman, tasloi, and yellow musk creeper.

The module was set in the World of Greyhawk campaign setting, and was later used to add detail to the continent of Hepmonaland in Greyhawk supplements. In the Greyhawk accessory The Scarlet Brotherhood, by Sean K. Reynolds, the Forbidden City was named Xuxulieto, and the mountains wherein it lies are called the Xaro Mountains.

== Reception ==
While Different Worlds described it as "a good buy", RPGnet gave it a slightly more favorable rating of nearly 6.8 ("Good"). Latter day D&D writer James Wyatt described it as the first "Super adventure", and lamented that with another hundred pages of fleshing out, it could have been as memorable as the landmark Temple of Elemental Evil.

Gerry Klug reviewed The Dwellers of the Forbidden City in Ares Magazine #12 and commented that "TSR has set a standard in the FRP-ing community which the rest try to keep up with. If Dwellers of the Forbidden City is any indication of what is coming, they may not live up to their own standards. E. Gary Gygax, where are you? "

Jim Bambra of White Dwarf reviewed the adventure in the magazine's "Open Box" feature and gave it an overall rating of 5 out of 10, commenting that while presentation of the module was quite good (8/10), it seemed to be "hastily thrown together". Bambra gave the adventure playability and enjoyment ratings of 5/10, and skill and complexity ratings of 6/10. He felt the adventure was "very mundane" and "lacks any real cohesion". Bambra noted that parts of the adventure were created for tournament play. The tournament section deals with getting into the city, and he felt the rest of the module seemed to be tacked on to that. He did like the mini-campaign included in the adventure, and the ideas included on how to expand on it. However, he felt that any Dungeon Master who used Dwellers of the Forbidden City would have to expend so much effort to make it more than "just a series of encounters," that they were better off "starting from scratch". Bambra concluded that this adventure was "just not worth considering" with all the other better quality modules available from TSR.

Dwellers of the Forbidden City was ranked the 13th greatest Dungeons & Dragons adventure of all time by Dungeon magazine for the 30th anniversary of the Dungeons & Dragons game in 2004. Judge Eric L. Boyd described it as a "classic adventure" in which Cook created a "lost city jungle in the great tradition of Edgar Rice Burroughs". The players "battle their way into the city through a labyrinth of traps and monsters or find their own way into the sprawling, jungle-cloaked ruins... Cook provides a host of backgrounds to motivate exploration of the city, but the map itself is motivation enough." Judge Wolfgang Baur, editor of Dungeon magazine, described the adventures thus: "This adventure may be best remembered for its monsters—it was from Forbidden City that D&D gained the Aboleth, the mongrel-man, the tasloi, and the yuan-ti. The aboleth that guarded one of the entrances to the city was worshipped by the local mongrelmen as a god."

Commenting on Dwellers of the Forbidden City in Black Gate, James Maliszewski said "It's a module that really can be used to good effect in multiple ways, a lesson I took to heart in my own adventures, even if I often failed to succeed as well as Cook did here."

== See also ==
- List of Dungeons & Dragons modules
