= Doc's Island =

Dungeons & Dragons adventure module

- Code: R4
- Authors: Frank Mentzer
- First published: 1983

Doc's Island is an adventure module published in 1983 for the Advanced Dungeons & Dragons fantasy role-playing game.

== Plot summary ==
Doc's Island is an adventure in which the player characters must deliver the Egg of the Phoenix to the unusual Doc's Island.

== Publication history ==
R-4 Doc's Island was written by Frank Mentzer, with art by Bob Walters, and published by TSR/RPGA in 1983 as a 16-page booklet with an outer folder. The module was a limited edition, and was only available for purchase to RPGA members. It was subsequently rewritten, and collected with the other modules from the R-series in I12 Egg of the Phoenix.
