= Bronze Canticles =

Fantasy novel series by Tracy and Laura Hickman

The Bronze Canticles is a series of fantasy novels written by Tracy and Laura Hickman, comprising to date Mystic Warrior (2004), Mystic Quest (2005), and Mystic Empire (2006).

The series is set across three worlds:

Aerbon, World of the Dragonkings: For more than four centuries, humanity has worshipped five immortal Dragonkings as gods. But even gods have secrets, and when a lowly blacksmith is taken from his home in a yearly sacrifice, he sets of a chain of events set to unveil them all.

Sine'shai, World of the Faery: The Faeries are the highest order of life, of that there is no doubt. One scientist's search for truth is about to upend everything her people have ever known.

G'tok, World of Lost Titans: The greedy Goblins worship machines and burn books. A lowly engineer endures visions of other worlds and begins to repair technology that shouldn't even exist. The Books in the series are:

Mystic Empire Mystic Quest Mystic Warrior
