= The Egg of the Phoenix =

Dungeons & Dragons adventure module

- Code: R-3
- Authors: Frank Mentzer
- First published: 1982

The Egg of the Phoenix is an adventure module published in 1982 for the Advanced Dungeons & Dragons fantasy role-playing game.

== Plot summary ==
The Egg of the Phoenix is an adventure in which the player characters travel to the Negative Material Plane to obtain the Egg of the Phoenix.

== Publication history ==
R-3 The Egg of the Phoenix was written by Frank Mentzer, with art by Bob Walters, and published by TSR/RPGA in 1982 as a 16-page booklet with an outer folder. The module was a limited edition, and was only available for purchase to RPGA members. It was subsequently rewritten, and collected with the other modules from the R-series in I12 Egg of the Phoenix.
