= Tomb of the Lizard King =

Dungeons & Dragons adventure module

- Code: I2
- TSR product code: 9055
- Rules required: Advanced Dungeons & Dragons 1st edition
- Character levels: 5 - 7
- Campaign setting: Generic D&D
- Authors: Mark Acres
- First published: 1982

Linked modules
- I1, I2, I3, I4, I5, I6, I7, I8, I9, I10, I11, I12, I13, I14

Tomb of the Lizard King is a Dungeons & Dragons' adventure module published in 1982 by TSR. In Tomb of the Lizard King, the player characters are employed by the Count of Eor to investigate a monstrous force that has been terrorizing caravans and peasants near the village of Waycombe. The adventure is appropriate for large groups of characters of level 5–7, or smaller groups with higher levels.

== Plot summary ==
Tomb of the Lizard King is a three-part adventure scenario in which the player characters must journey through the wilderness, combat brigands, and explore the tomb of a Lizard King. Brigands have disrupted the southern trade routes, and the merchants are demanding that the Count of Eor stop the attacks. The Count puts out the call for adventurers to end the raids and discover what is behind the attacks.

== Publication history ==
Tomb of the Lizard King was written by Mark Acres and illustrated by Jim Holloway and Jeff Easley. It was published by TSR in 1982 as a 32-page booklet with an outer folder. The module is part of the "Intermediate" series (I2) for the AD&D game, and was used as the tournament module at Origins 1980. The adventure was edited by Michael Williams and illustrated by Harry J. Quinn. While Tomb of the Lizard King could originally be played in any setting, it has since been retroactively placed into the World of Greyhawk campaign setting. In an article by Gary Holian in Living Greyhawk Journal, No. 1, it was revealed that the County of Eor had been absorbed into the Kingdom of Keoland.

== Reception ==
Doug Cowie reviewed I2 favorably for Imagine magazine, calling it a "one off exercise with various encounters occurring in widely differing settings" and praising the well-drawn maps. Although he found the outline and "source of villainy" very similar to module N1, Cowie thought I2 was a better-presented adventure than N1 as it provides an "interesting setting, good NPCs, and some very dangerous underground encounters".

Jim Bambra reviewed Tomb of the Lizard King for White Dwarf magazine. He gave it a nine out of ten overall, calling it "a difficult adventure that was designed to test a party's mettle and playing skill". While pre-rolled player characters are provided with the module, Bambra felt that it was worth using a player's own character because "there are some nice goodies to be had". He did note that the module was a victim of sloppy printing in places, but felt that the mistakes should be obvious enough to pose no problems to a competent Dungeon Master. Bambra concluded by describing the module as "[a] good module for those who enjoy challenging gaming sessions with plenty of opportunity to be cautious, thoughtful and aggressive."

In Lawrence Schick's 1991 book Heroic Worlds, he calls the Lizard King "extremely nasty".

== See also ==
- List of Dungeons & Dragons modules
