= To the Aid of Falx =

Dungeons & Dragons adventure module

- Code: R-1
- Authors: Frank Mentzer
- First published: 1982

To the Aid of Falx is an adventure module published in 1982 for the Advanced Dungeons & Dragons fantasy role-playing game.

== Plot summary ==
To the Aid of Falx is an adventure in which the player characters help a silver dragon by bringing back five potions of silver dragon control hidden in a thieves' lair.

== Publication history ==
R-1 To the Aid of Falx was written by Frank Mentzer, with art by Jim Holloway, and published by TSR/RPGA in 1982 as a 16-page booklet with an outer folder. The module was a limited edition, and was only available for purchase to RPGA members. It was subsequently rewritten, and collected with the other modules from the R-series in I12 Egg of the Phoenix.
