= Ravager of Time =

Dungeons & Dragons adventure

- Code: I8
- TSR product code: 9169
- Rules required: AD&D (1st Edition)
- Character levels: 8 - 10
- Campaign setting: Generic
- Authors: Graeme Morris & Jim Bambra
- First published: 1986
- ISBN: 978-0-88038-277-9

Linked modules
- I1, I2, I3, I4, I5, I6, I7, I8, I9, I10, I11, I12, I13, I14

Ravager of Time is an Advanced Dungeons & Dragons game module published in 1986. In the game, player characters, stricken by a rapid aging process, engage in a campaign against the sorceress Nuala that culminates in an assault on Nuala's keep.The adventure takes place in a swampland setting. The adventure is a TSR UK branch production and features non-player character types, expository style, atmosphere, and situations that are notably different from many of the game modules created in the US.

== Plot summary ==
Ravager of Time is set in the Ffenarch. The Ffenarch is a dismal, boggy environment with only some small areas of firm ground. The player characters are hired to search the fens for a lord's son who killed his father, but while searching, they discover an evil plot that is tainting the Theocracy of Ffenarch in their temple-palace of Eylea.

Long before the adventurers were hired, Lord Temporal Rughlor returned from the wider world to settle at Ffenargh Manor, Lorge, with his radiant young wife, Nuala. But Nuala's beauty hid a will for evil and a hunger for the forgotten lore of an ancient wizard buried below Lorge. Rughlor discovered his wife's evil intentions and destroyed her himself. As a result, Lorge was abandoned. However, Nuala's treacherous beauty, even as a distorted tale, fascinated another scion of Ffenargh Manor, Miles D'Arcy. D'Arcy, with the aid of a thief and one of Eylea's strange relics, found Nuala's remains and resurrected her. He completed her last spell, causing his own doom, and embroiling a group of powerful adventurers in Nuala's plot to gain allies in her bid for power in the Ffenargh. Nuala now plans to use these adventurers and her own new powers to overthrow the creaky clerical hierarchy of Eylea and rule Ffenargh.

== Contents ==
The adventure includes statistics for new monsters such as the slime golem and the life-bane duplicates. Printed inside the cover are maps of the area and of major buildings found in the module. The module's eight pull-out pages contain details of the main non-player characters, giving notes on appearance, personality, usual clothing, equipment and full statistics. The module includes full magic-user spell books instead of the usual memorized spells for spell-casters in the adventure and uses Unearthed Arcana spells, magic items, comeliness and cavaliers.

== Publication history ==
Ravager of Time was written by Graeme Morris and Jim Bambra, with cover art by Jeff Anderson, and interior illustrations by Tim Sell. It was published by TSR in 1986 as a 24-page booklet with an outer folder.

Production was by Phil Gallagher and the TSR UK Design Team. Cartography was by Geoff Wingate, with proofreading by Carol Morris and Mike Brunton, and typesetting by Don Buxton and Phil Gallagher.

== Reception ==
John S. Davies reviewed Ravager of Time for the British magazine Adventurer #3 (August/September 1986). He called the maps well drawn and clear. About the storyline, he commented that "this is no simple murder mystery, though there are clues for the party to investigate, and some problems to be solved by other means than brute force. DMs with players who are fond of combat should not be put off because there are plenty of monsters for them, and a few nasty surprises." Davies added that the scenario "gives enough background for the DM to keep it running smoothly, and presents the main storyline in five sections, in chronological order. These are well laid out and the DM should have no trouble keeping track of what's going on where, and to whom." He concludes that the scenario is worthwhile, calling it "a well-balanced, interesting adventure for a medium to high level party".

== See also ==
- List of Dungeons & Dragons modules
