= DayStar West Media =

American roleplaying game company

DayStar West Media was an American game company that produced role-playing games and game supplements.

== History ==
The original Rahasia was written by Laura Hickman, and was first published in 1979 by DayStar West Media. Laura and Tracy Hickman published their adventure Pharaoh through DayStar West Media in 1980. Pharaoh was part of the "Night Ventures" line of scenarios by DayStar West Media Productions. These early modules were a significant innovation in for fantasy RPG modules, since they had an interesting story with an objective that was achievable in one or two sessions as well as dungeons that were based in the architecture of a possible location.
