= Day of Al'Akbar =

Dungeons & Dragons adventure module

- Code: I9
- TSR product code: 9178
- Rules required: AD&D (1st Edition)
- Character levels: 8 - 10
- Campaign setting: Generic Arabic
- Authors: Allen Hammack
- First published: 1986
- ISBN: 0-88038-320-8

Linked modules
- I1, I2, I3, I4, I5, I6, I7, I8, I9, I10, I11, I12, I13, I14

Day of Al'Akbar is an Advanced Dungeons & Dragons adventure module written by Allen Hammack and published by TSR inc. in 1986. The module consists of a forty-page booklet with a large color map and an outer folder. It bears the Dungeons & Dragons code I9, I meaning intermediate and 9 for module 9 in that series.

== Plot summary ==
The Day of Al'Akbar is an adventure scenario set in a once peaceful desert land reminiscent of the Arabian Nights. The module contains two distinct settings, Khaibar City and the Sultan's palace.

Khaibar city is ruled by the bandit leader Al'Farzikh, and was once ruled by the sultan Al'Akbar. The people are at risk from a red plague, and the player characters are set on a quest to retrieve the magical artifacts that will save them. The scenario involves player characters searching the sewers underneath Khaibar to find the entrance that leads to the tomb of Al'Akbar, which contains the Cup and Talisman that they need.

The players' choices determine whether the search will involve wilderness encounters, a dungeon crawl through a sewer, tomb robbing, or investigating in a desert town, while the final confrontation takes place in the Sultan's palace.

=== Table of contents ===
Chapter	Page
Introduction	2
Journey to Khaibar	3
The sewers of Khaibar	5
Beyond the Walls	14
The Sultan's Palace	35
Artifacts	pullout section
Glossary of Useful Terms	pullout section
Pre-rolled Characters	pullout section
Players' Riddle Illustration	39

=== Notable non-player characters ===
- Al'Farzikh: 7th level assassin
- Vahtak: 6th level thief
- The Mad Dog of the Desert: 14th level Magic user/16th level assassin
- The Crescent Witch: 8th level Magic user

== Publication history ==
Day of Al'Akbar was published by TSR inc. in 1986 as a 40-page booklet with a large color map and an outer folder. The game module was written and designed by Allen Hammack. Jeff Easley produced the cover art. The city map of Khaibar is A1 size.

The game module was developed by Bruce A. Heard and the adventure was illustrated by Mark Nelson. The map was drawn by Diane and David C. Sutherland III. Typesetting was done by Betty Elmore. The module was edited by Kerry Martin. The module was distributed to the book trade in the United States by Random House, Inc., in Canada by Random House of Canada, Ltd. and in the United Kingdom by TSR UK Ltd. The module's product number was 9178.

== Reception ==
Tom Zunder reviewed Day of Al'Akbar for the British magazine, Adventurer in January 1987 (issue 6). He first commented on the cover, saying, "Gary Gygax really must have left Lake Geneva at last [as Gygax] was really keen on the 'family' image - and these playboy lasses on the front cover would certainly not have passed in the old days". He calls the city map of Khaibar, "a wonderful bundle of colour" and "beautifully done, it has none of those annoying give-away labels, nor does it have the ugly grey squares which obliterated the Lhankmar [sic] map. A nice map, backed with useful hexes, and a good start to the package." He called the first three encounters on the trek to the city of Khaibar "extremely silly and unnecessary", and the subsequent sewer dungeons "so-so", but after that he found a "well-detailed city with some real potential for role-playing". He concluded the review, stating the scenario is "flawed, it doesn't explain the city in the best way - as an overall. It presents good material in a depressingly linear dungeons-style [...] It is, however, an excellent scenario for AD&D, providing plenty of excitement with a wonderful setting, well detailed and researched. The scenario is not at all bad, and a good referee could easily ignore it and just develop the setting itself, it's certainly worth it. D&Ders should buy this, others wouldn't do badly in investing as well - not at all bad!"

In March 1987, White Dwarf (issue 87), Carl Sargent noted that although the town map is moderately useful and the adventure's Arabic environment is detailed enough, the module is overall an "uninspired effort". He called the wilderness encounters pointless and silly and noted the existence of errors in the game statistics. Sargent felt that the only noteworthy thing about the module was Jeff Easley's "sexploitation cover".
