= Frank Mentzer =

American writer and game designer

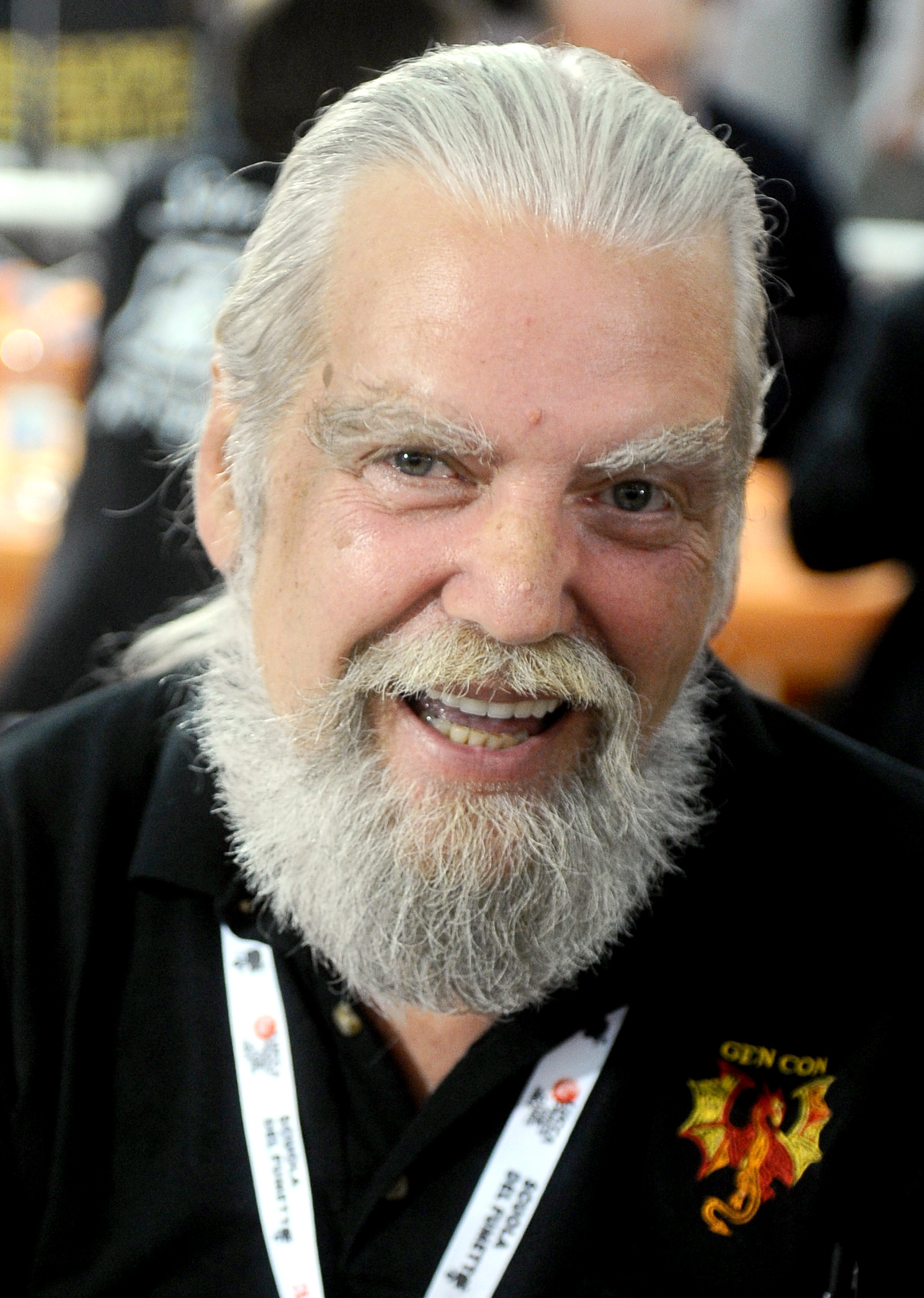
- Frank Mentzer at the 2014 Lucca Comics & Games
- Born: Jacob Franklin Mentzer III; Springfield, Pennsylvania
- Citizenship: United States
- Occupations: Author; editor; game designer
- Spouse: Debbie
- Writing career
- Pen name: Frank Mentzer
- Subject: Fantasy roleplaying games
- Notable works: Dungeons & Dragons: Basic, Expert, Companion, Master & Immortal Boxed Sets

Jacob Franklin Mentzer III is an American fantasy author and game designer who worked on early materials for the Dungeons & Dragons (D&D) fantasy role-playing game. He was an employee of TSR, Inc. from 1980 to 1986, spending part of that time as creative advisor to the chairman of the board, Gary Gygax. He also founded the Role-Playing Games Association (RPGA) during his time with TSR.

After Gygax was ousted from TSR at the end of 1985, Mentzer left TSR as well and helped him to start New Infinities Productions Inc. (NIPI). When this venture failed, Mentzer left the gaming industry, eventually becoming the manager of a bakery. In 2008, he closed down this business and, two years later, returned to the gaming industry as a founding partner of a new publishing company, Eldritch Enterprises. In 2026, Mentzer has launched a new company, Temporal Studios.

== Early life ==
Frank Mentzer was born in the Philadelphia suburb of Springfield, Pennsylvania, the older of two children; his sibling is Susanne Mentzer. While attending Springfield High School, he started to play folk music. He played his first paid folk music concert at the opening of the Visitors' Center for the Liberty Bell and Independence Hall in downtown Philadelphia at age sixteen. Immediately after Mentzer graduated from high school in 1968, his father, who worked for the National Park Service (NPS), moved the family to Maryland in order to work at Catoctin Mountain Park. Mentzer enrolled at West Virginia Wesleyan College, but he was also interested in furthering his folk music career. With his father's advice on who in the NPS to contact, Mentzer was able to arrange to play concerts at various NPS sites. In 1972, he was hired by NPS to play a public concert in the White House gardens for inner-city children. At one point during the concert Pat Nixon, followed by national news crews, came to listen, and a clip of Mentzer singing "If I Had a Hammer" subsequently appeared on national newscasts that evening. Following college graduation, Mentzer enrolled at Northeastern University for further studies in mathematics and physics. However, he subsequently moved back to the Philadelphia area, and for a short time during the 1970s, he worked as the manager of a pinball arcade.

== TSR, Inc. ==
In the mid-1970s, Mentzer and a friend taught themselves how to play the new role-playing game Dungeons & Dragons, and he became part of a group of eight to twelve players who played several times a week. In 1979, TSR, the company that published D&D, advertised for a designer and an editor. Although Mentzer was initially uninterested since he had no editorial or design experience, fellow player David Axler, who would go on to write an article for the December 1981 issue of Dragon magazine about how to determine the weather in the World of Greyhawk campaign setting,—urged him to apply. Mentzer finally relented and after a phone interview with TSR, he was hired for the editorial position, Tom Moldvay was hired as the new designer, and in January 1980, Mentzer moved to Lake Geneva, Wisconsin.

Soon after joining TSR, he was invited to participate in TSR's first "DM Invitational", a contest to choose D&D's best overall dungeon master; other contestants included Len Lakofka and Erol Otus. At Gen Con 1980, it was announced that Mentzer was the winner, and he was awarded a silver cup and a gold dragon chain of office. Mike Carr of TSR had been contemplating starting a TSR-sponsored D&D fan club. Shortly after Mentzer won the DM Invitational, Carr approached him about taking on that task. Mentzer agreed to form some sort of group but, rather than a simple fan club, he was interested in promoting better quality role-playing, especially during scored D&D events at conventions. Mentzer felt that the system as it stood rewarded those players that stayed quiet at the table, in effect punishing good role-players. He came up with a scoring system where the dungeon master and the players all voted on who had been the best role-player at the table. With this in place, Mentzer formed the Role Playing Game Association (RPGA), an organization that would promote quality role-playing and allow fans of role-playing games to meet and play games with each other. Mentzer wrote four RPGA tournament adventures set in his home campaign setting of "Aquaria", which he had been running since 1976; these were published by TSR as the first four of the R-series modules: R1 To the Aid of Falx, R2 The Investigation of Hydell, R3 The Egg of the Phoenix, and R4 Doc's Island. Mentzer envisioned them as becoming a part of Gary Gygax's World of Greyhawk setting, the first part of a new "Aqua-Oeridian" campaign set somewhere on Oerth outside of the Flanaess. (The connection between Aquaria and Greyhawk was never made, but these four modules were later revised by Mentzer and Jennell Jaquays and re-published as the "super-module" I12 Egg of the Phoenix in 1989.)

In his review of Egg of the Phoenix, Ken Rolston called Mentzer "a clever and original designer", and said that of all of the better-known adventure designers of the time he: "comes closest to creating scenarios in which the protagonists behave as if the game's rule books were physics texts describing the laws governing the workings of the universe".

Mentzer became involved with the auction of hobby gaming materials at Gen Con in 1983, and was involved with what is now called the world's largest game auction every year until retiring after Gen Con 50 in 2017.

Mentzer was soon promoted to Creative Director at TSR, and one of the tasks he was given was to collate and revise the various rules sets for Basic D&D in such a way that no rules, monsters, or other material that had been developed specifically for Advanced Dungeons & Dragons (AD&D), were borrowed. Mentzer's third edition of the D&D Basic Set (1983) was used to launch a series of five rules boxed sets that ultimately allowed characters to advance from first level to godhood. This resulted in the Expert (1984), Companion (1984), Master (1985), and Immortals (1986) boxed sets of D&D rules - collectively known as BECMI. These were eventually translated into eleven languages, and millions were sold worldwide.

Mentzer's other work included: IM-1 The Immortal Storm (1986), I-11 Needle (1987), and an adventure module for TSR's Star Frontiers game based on Arthur C. Clarke's novel 2001: A Space Odyssey. Because of his work with the Gen Con game auction, Mentzer had become interested in the game memorabilia market, and along with James Ward and Jean Black, wrote The Game Buyers' Price Guide 1986, which summarized current market prices for hobby games. Further annual editions were planned, but when Mentzer left TSR, the project was shelved.

Mentzer expanded Gary Gygax's Village of Hommlet adventure into the adventure module T1-4 The Temple of Elemental Evil (1985), the first of a new format of 96-page to 128-page squarebound paperback supplements, which allowed more space to detail settings and adventures. Mentzer worked closely with Gygax on that module, as well as the accessory The Book of Marvelous Magic (1985).

== New Infinities Productions, Inc. ==
In late 1985, Gary Gygax and Lorraine Williams vied for control of TSR, which eventually resulted in Gygax's ousting. Mentzer, who had worked closely with Gygax for six years, and shared his vision of the direction for D&D, was unwilling to work for Williams, and left TSR in 1986.

Gygax quickly formed New Infinities Productions, Inc. (NIPI) to create new products for the role-playing game market, and Mentzer joined as Design Executive. Mentzer, together with Gygax and Kim Mohan, formed the Creative Committee.

The company's first product was the science fiction-themed Cyborg Commando, with Mentzer as the primary designer using notes from Gygax, which was published in 1987. New Infinites began working on a third product line, which began with an adventure written by Mentzer called The Convert (1987); TSR had rejected The Convert as a D&D adventure for an RPGA tournament, and while Mentzer got verbal permission to publish it with New Infinities, but since the permission was not in writing TSR filed an injunction to prevent its sale, and the adventure was never published even though the injunction was later lifted. The next project was a new fantasy role-playing game spanning multiple genres called Dangerous Journeys. It was originally to have been called Dangerous Dimensions, but the name was changed in response to the threat of a lawsuit from TSR, Inc. who claimed that the "DD" abbreviation would be too similar to "D&D." When the product was released by Game Designers' Workshop, TSR immediately sued for copyright infringement. The suit was eventually settled out of court, with TSR buying the complete rights to the Dangerous Journeys system from New Infinities and then permanently shelving the entire project. This led to the demise of NIPI, and Mentzer decided to leave the game industry.

== Life after game design ==
For some years afterwards, Mentzer did a bit of writing, including Kam's Cooking Without Fire with Paul Kamikawa (1992), and "Trust at the Gaming Table", part of the Origins Award-winning Game Master Secrets Vol. II (Grey Ghost Press, 2003). He also became a collector of hobby games, and an expert on their worth at auction.

In 2000, he and his second wife Debbie moved to Minocqua, Wisconsin and opened a bakery. His wife became the baker while Mentzer acted as manager. This operation eventually expanded to include three bakeries. However, running the bakeries was time-consuming, and by 2008, faced with other demands on their lives, the Mentzers decided to shut down their bakeries and move to Rockford, Illinois.

== Re-entering the game design market ==
In November 2010, Tim Kask announced at the KC Game Fair that he, Mentzer, Jim Ward and Chris Clark had formed Eldritch Enterprises, in order to publish a variety of general works as well as new creations for roleplaying games written by the partners. Eldritch Enterprises was incorporated in April 2011, with immediate plans to publish a children's book series, a baking book by Mentzer's wife Debbie, and various hobby game projects focused on "Old School" roleplaying systems such as the original D&D rule set and Metamorphosis Alpha. Mentzer launched a new company, Temporal Studios, in July 2026, including plans for roleplaying accessories, gaming history works and other publications.
