= Egg of the Phoenix =

D&D module

- Code: I12
- TSR product code: 9201
- Rules required: AD&D (1st Edition)
- Character levels: 5 - 9
- Campaign setting: Generic
- Authors: Frank Mentzer and Jennell Jaquays (Note: Credited as Paul Jaquays.)
- First published: 1987

Linked modules
- I1, I2, I3, I4, I5, I6, I7, I8, I9, I10, I11, I12, I13, I14

Egg of the Phoenix is an adventure module published in 1987 for the Advanced Dungeons & Dragons fantasy role-playing game.

== Plot summary ==
Egg of the Phoenix is an adventure in which the player characters (PCs) investigate a slaver ring, and must ultimately work to save the land of New Empyrea from the lords of Elemental Evil. The module includes dungeons, wilderness adventures, time travel, and extraplanar journeys.

== Publication history ==
I12 Egg of the Phoenix was designed by Frank Mentzer, with additional design, development, and editing by Jennell Jaquays. The module's cover is by Keith Parkinson, and it was published by TSR in 1987 as an eighty-page book, a twenty-page booklet, and an unattached outer folder. The booklet contains a map and pre-generated PCs. This module was a linkage of four formerly unlinked scenarios originally published in the RPGA modules R1 through R4.

== Reception ==
Ken Rolston reviewed Egg of the Phoenix for Dragon magazine #133. He felt that the first three scenarios were "original, challenging, and entertaining, particularly in their exploitation of the peculiar logic of the AD&D game universe", but had reservations about the final scenario, which "despite having a plausible game rationale and logical self-consistency, strikes me as gross and overly busy rather than lean and elegant". He felt that assembling these tournament scenarios into an epic campaign was not very successful, because Mentzer had not designed them as a sequence, and they originally had nothing to do with one another. He said, "the narrative frame isn't particularly persuasive, nor do the supplemental encounters or transitions match the tone and theme of Mentzer's original tournament designs", and "the introductory motivations for involving the PCs in the epic quest are rather arbitrary". Rolston also noted some careless production errors, such as a number of typos in the first few pages, and that the text refers to the map book as a twenty-page center pullout. Despite his complaints that the campaign frame and the production quality were not satisfactory, Rolston concluded by saying: "There's some very good stuff in here: nine sessions or more of solid and occasionally brilliant material. The tournament-based adventures may be the strongest of Mentzer's peculiarly original AD&D game designs."
