= Laura Hickman =

American fantasy author (born 1956)

Laura Curtis Hickman
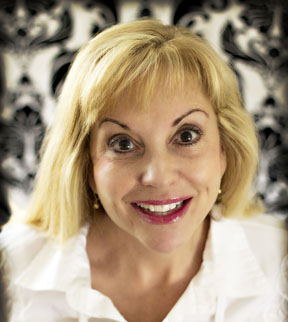
- Laura Hickman
- Born: Laura Curtis; December 7, 1956 (age 69) Long Beach, California, U.S.
- Occupation: Novelist, game designer
- Period: 1984–present
- Genre: Fantasy fiction
- Spouse: Tracy Hickman (m. 1977)
- Children: 4

Website
- www.bakingoutsidethebox.com

Laura Curtis Hickman (born December 7, 1956) is an American fantasy author, best known for her works in game design and fantasy novels cowritten with her husband, Tracy Hickman.

== Early life ==
Laura Curtis was born on December 7, 1956, in Long Beach, California. She married Tracy Hickman in 1977. They have four children. Laura Hickman is a member of the LDS Church.

== Career ==
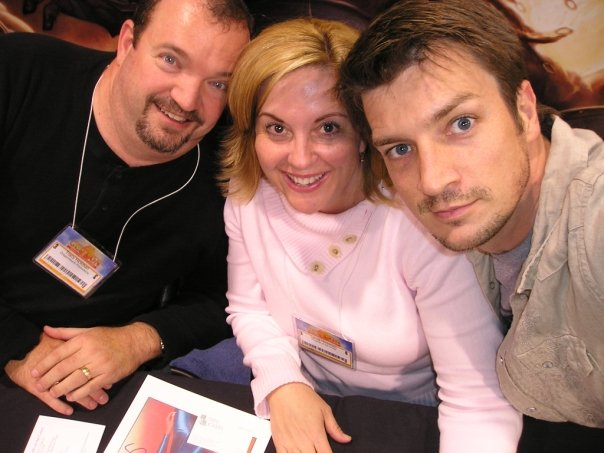
Hickman with husband Tracy Hickman (left) and Nathan Fillion (right)

Early on in her marriage, Hickman introduced her husband, Tracy, to the Dungeons & Dragons roleplaying game. The two co-wrote modules for the game while living in Provo, resulting in the original versions of the modules Rahasia and Pharaoh, which the Hickmans self-published through DayStar West Media in 1980. Their adventure modules began as "photocopied pages with covers [they] would staple together on the card table in [their] kitchen." These early modules were a significant innovation for fantasy RPG modules, since they had an interesting story with an objective that was achievable in one or two sessions, as well as dungeons that were based in the architecture of a possible location.

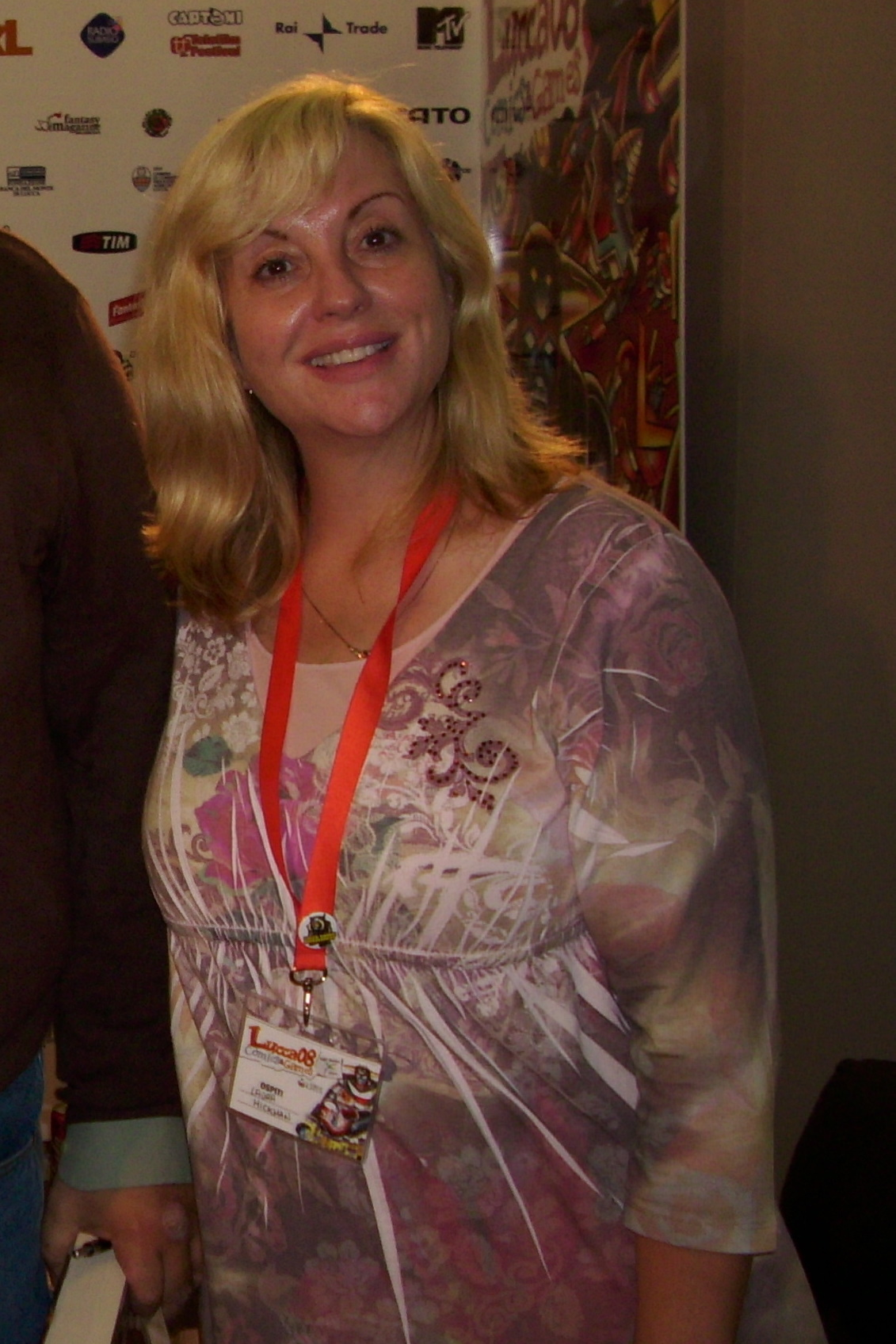
Hickman at Lucca Comics & Games 2008

During the early 1980s, the Hickmans were living in Logan, Utah, and were struggling financially after Tracy's business associate left him with $30,000 in debt. Upon hearing that the Dungeons & Dragons publisher, TSR, would pay $500 for new modules, the Hickmans decided to send Rahasia and Pharaoh to the company. TSR agreed to publish the Hickmans' modules.

The Hickmans started working at TSR and moved to Wisconsin, developing their idea for Dragonlance during the drive there. Laura was the inspiration for the character Laurana Kanan. Dragonlance became "the first project TSR, Inc. had undertaken that would include adult novels as well as games, calendars, and other spin-off products." The Dragonlance universe, supported by many writers and artists at TSR, become very popular, with half a million game modules and two million books sold by 1987. While at TSR, the Hickmans wrote the popular and innovative Advanced Dungeons & Dragons Ravenloft (1983) module. Polygon writer Charlie Hall described the module as "the first story-based D&D campaign". The book Dungeon Master For Dummies chose the module as one of the ten best classic adventures and praised the detailed yet concise plot and isometric maps. The book also claims that Ravenloft "inspired game designers and Dungeon Masters to take the art of adventure to the next level." Ravenloft inspired a campaign setting of the same name.

The Hickmans published the Bronze Canticles series together, starting with Mystic Warrior in 2004. Tracy and Laura hosted a podcast called DragonHearth until December 2010. They also wrote the adventure Out in the Black (2006) for the Serenity Role Playing Game for Margaret Weis Productions. The Whitney Awards gave an Outstanding Achievement award to the Hickmans for having "paved the way in out-of-the-box publishing methods". Hickman has been involved at writing conferences such as Writing and Illustrating for Young Readers.

In 2010, the Hickmans launched a direct-to-internet serialized fantasy series, "Dragon's Bard".

== Works ==
=== Game supplements ===
Co-written with Tracy Hickman.
For Dungeons & Dragons:

- Rahasia (1979)
- Pharaoh (1980)

For Advanced Dungeons & Dragons:

- Ravenloft (1983)
- Dragons of War (1984)
- Ravenloft II: The House on Gryphon Hill (1986) - outline and plot

For the Serenity Role Playing Game:

- Out in the Black (2006)

=== Fiction ===
- Dragonlance series
  - "Heart of Goldmoon" published in Love and War (Dragonlance) (1987) (co-written with Kate Novak)

==== Co-written with Tracy Hickman ====
- Bronze Canticles series
  - Mystic Warrior (2004)
  - Mystic Quest (2005)
  - Mystic Empire (2006)
- Tales of the Dragon's Bard series
  - Eventide (2010)
  - Blackshore (2013)
  - Moredale (unpublished)
  - St. Nicholas and the Dragon (2012)
- Swept Up By the Sea: A Romantic Fairy Tale (2013)
- Sojourner Tales (2014)
- The Nightbirds series
  - Unwept (2014)
  - Unhonored (2016)

=== Non-fiction ===
- Baking Outside the Box: Volume 1 The Goody Mix
