= Pharaoh (module) =

Dungeons & Dragons adventure module

- The cover of the Pharaoh module, with art by Jim Holloway. The artwork depicts the ghostly pharaoh Amun-Re motioning towards his tomb.
- Code: I3
- TSR product code: 9052
- Rules required: Dungeons & Dragons
- Character levels: 5 - 7
- Authors: Tracy & Laura Hickman
- First published: 1982

Linked modules
- I1, I2, I3, I4, I5, I6, I7, I8, I9, I10, I11, I12, I13, I14

Pharaoh is an adventure module for the Dungeons & Dragons fantasy role-playing game. The module was published in 1982 by TSR, Inc. for the first edition Advanced Dungeons & Dragons rules. It formed the first of the three-part Desert of Desolation module series. The module was written by Tracy and Laura Hickman; Tracy Hickman would later go on to help create the Dragonlance campaign setting.

== Plot summary ==
The original Daystar West edition of the scenario features a tomb that is rumored to be impossible to steal from. As the adventure begins, the player characters encounter the ghost of a Pharaoh who died many years ago and was cursed to wander his deserted land until he finds someone to break the curse and set him free from the world of the living. The characters search for items that will not only end the curse, but will also give them wealth and power. The pyramid has five levels to explore, along with a large temple outside of the pyramid.

The TSR version of Pharaoh is an Egyptian-styled adventure that contains a map of a pyramid and includes a maze filled with traps. In Pharaoh, the player characters (PCs) are exiled into the desert after being falsely accused of a crime. The characters travel to find the sunken city of Pazar and must then travel to the haunted tomb of a pharaoh from ancient times. While in the desert, the characters meet the spirit of pharaoh Amun-Re, who has been cursed to roam the desert until someone robs his tomb to steal the staff of ruling and Star Gem, which he begs the PCs to do because the tomb was designed to be thief-proof and no one has succeeded so far. While inside the pyramid of Amun-Re, the characters will have access to an item called the dome of flight which they can use to control gravity or reverse it, which can be dangerous if used incorrectly because they can fall upwards rapidly; the same room with the dome of flight also contains palm trees with fruit that explodes. The characters also encounter a maze with numerous traps. The module also includes maps of the wilderness, and multiple shorter adventures.

== Publication history ==
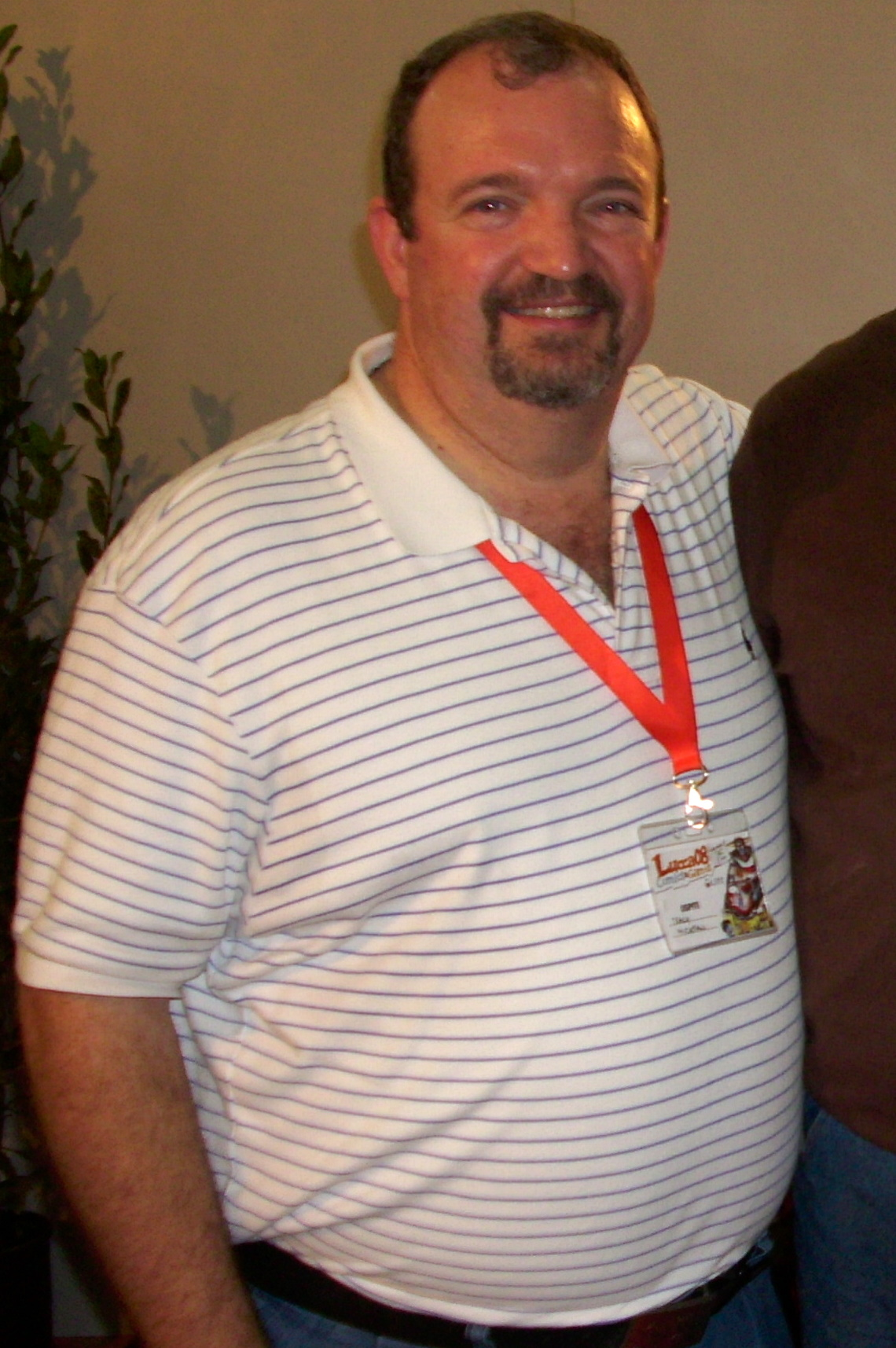
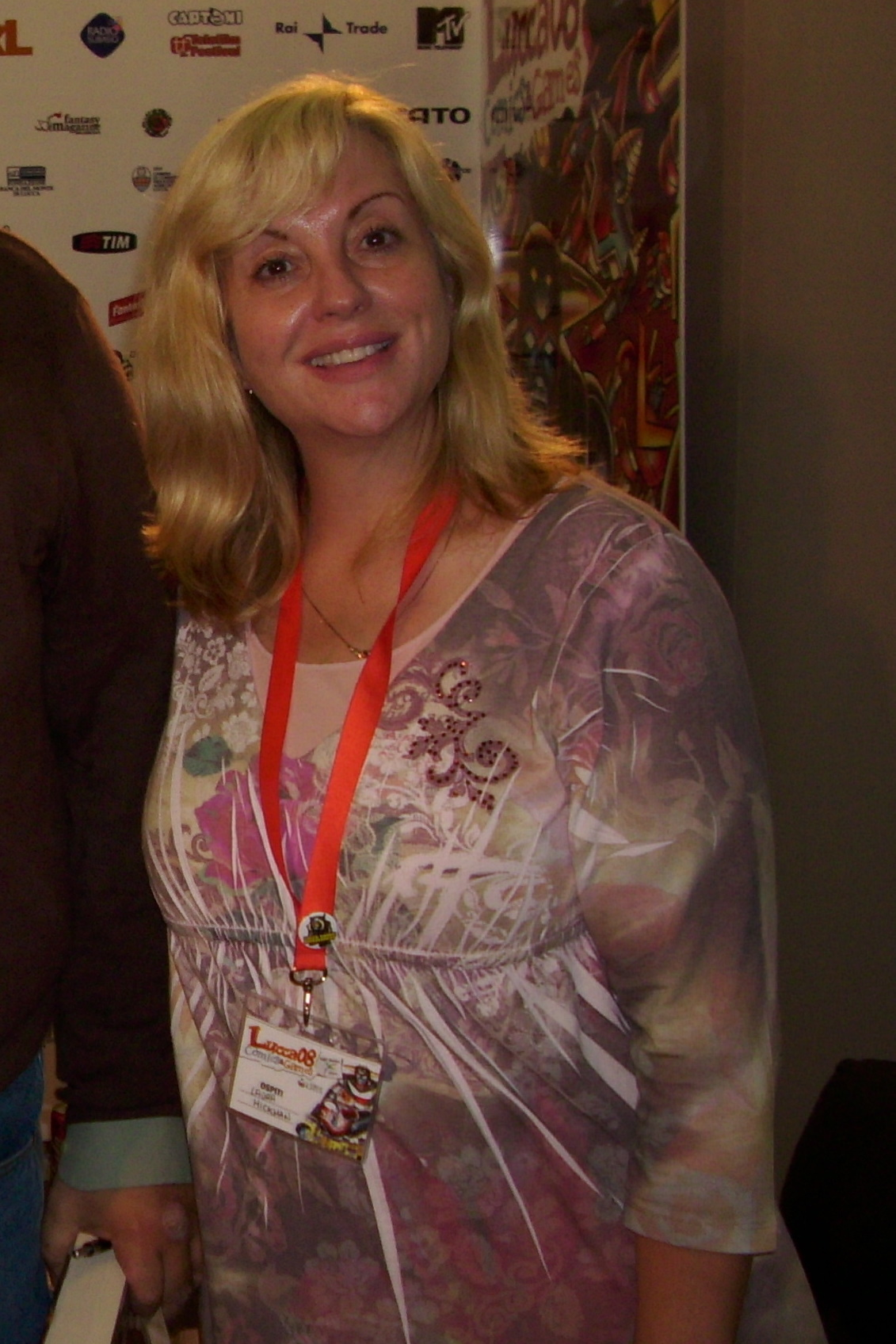
Tracy and Laura Hickman, designers of Pharaoh

Tracy Hickman (co-creator of the Dragonlance campaign setting) and Laura Hickman were married in June 1977. Soon after, while living in Provo, Utah, they wrote the adventures Pharaoh and Ravenloft. The Hickmans privately published their first two adventures, Rahasia and Pharaoh, which earned them a local reputation. DayStar West Media Productions published Pharaoh as part of the "Night Ventures" line of adventure scenarios in 1980, as a sixty-eight-page book. The module was designed to be completed to its conclusion within the playing time of a couple of game sessions. Tracy was working with a business associate who left the Hickmans to deal with thirty-thousand dollars in bad checks, for which they declared bankruptcy, and Tracy Hickman decided to sell their adventure modules to TSR, "literally so that I could buy shoes for my children". TSR purchased the adventures, and also hired Tracy as a game designer:

"They said it would be easier to publish my adventures if I was part of the company. So, we made the move from Utah to Wisconsin."

In 1982, TSR published Pharaoh as a thirty-two-page booklet with two outer folders, for the first edition of AD&D. It was designed for 6-8 player characters of levels 5-7 and formed the first of the three-part Desert of Desolation module series. The cover art for Pharaoh was provided by Jim Holloway.

Tracy Hickman noted that Dungeon Masters can use Pharaoh to teach positive lessons about the concepts of goodness to young people, saying of the eponymous Pharaoh character, the "apparent misery to which this figure was condemned by his own lust for wealth continues to teach the value of deeds over possessions to all who play that game today."

A remastered version of the adventure was published in the anthology Quests from the Infinite Staircase for Dungeons & Dragons 5th edition on July 16, 2024.

== Reception ==
Harley Bates reviewed the Daystar West edition of the adventure in The Space Gamer No. 54. He commented that "It's a nice break from standard ongoing campaigns, and gives both players and judges attainable goals in shorter steps." Bates added that "The inhabitants of the tomb are far from the ordinary fare and provide the players and the judge with fascinating role-playing. There are many clues and puzzles scattered throughout the adventure. All in all, it's a very tightly-woven adventure which should be enjoyable for all involved." He criticized that "The only real flaw is that there are too many typographical errors. Most of the play supplements available today suffer from this. Couldn't designers and publishers spend just a little more time proofreading?" Bates concluded his review by stating: "Given the overall quality we are presented in this product, the typos can be overlooked [...] It's a great buy, considering the time, effort, and thought evident throughout."

Dungeon Master for Dummies lists Pharaoh as one of the ten best classic adventures.

Doug Cowie reviewed Pharaoh very favorably for Imagine magazine. He noted the "first rate cover art" and the overall "value-for-money feel" of the module. He also praised the well-designed layout and the standardized approach to describing encounter areas. Cowie expected that those who played this "dangerous, tricky and entertaining" module would wish to continue with the sequels I4 and I5. One month later, Doug Cowie also reviewed Oasis of the White Palm favorably for Imagine magazine. He found it a "tough test" for the players and praised the "first rate cover art" and "lively illustrations" inside. Cowie found I4 a "mainstream AD&D adventure with plenty of treasure, traps and tricks" situated mostly in "traditional room/corridor environments". But according to him it also offers "plenty of interesting goings-on between NPC individuals and groups" so that the players find themselves in a "dynamic society". Cowie cautioned that some encounters are quite complicated so the DM needs to study the module closely before running it. Cowie felt I4 to be an "excellent, varied module" that offered "excitement, depth and tension". He concluded his review by calling it "a must for those who have played I3 and highly recommended for anyone else."

Pharaoh and Oasis of the White Palm were reviewed in White Dwarf, No. 45 by Jim Bambra, who gave both modules 10 of out 10 overall. Bambra felt that Pharaoh involved "some excellent adventure situations," and said that the "design of the pyramid is very imaginative and the use of wall carvings to provide background information to the adventure really brings it to life making it more than just a collection of rooms." He felt that the presentation of both modules was excellent, and liked the new format, which utilized a short paragraph to quickly describe how the adventure should be run. He felt that this system, which also included distinct listings of traps, tricks, monsters, and treasure, "makes it far easier to find information quickly and reduced the chance of leaving something important out in the heat of play." Bambra concluded by stating that these "are both excellent adventures, they are imaginative, colourful and challenging."

The module was considered as a milestone in dungeon design because since that moment they needed to have « an overarching, cohesive plot, usually with epic overtones. Dungeons were not silly little mazes, but structures that made sense architecturally. And encounters had to make sense within the overall plot. » This new movement of dungeon design was called the « Hickman Revolution » by James Maliszewski.

== Credits ==
Design: Tracy & Laura Hickman Editing: Curtis Smith Cover Art: Jim Holloway. ISBN 0-88038-007-1.

== Notable nonplayer characters ==
- Pasha of the Efreet, vizier of the fire Sultan

=== New Monsters ===
- Dustdiggers
- Symbaysns
- Thunder herders
- Thune Dervishes

== See also ==
- List of Dungeons & Dragons modules
