= Isle of the Ape =

Dungeons & Dragons adventure module

- Code: WG6
- TSR product code: 9153
- Rules required: 1st Ed AD&D
- Character levels: 18 +
- Campaign setting: Greyhawk
- Authors: Gary Gygax
- First published: 1985

Linked modules
- WG4 WG5 WG6 WG7

Isle of the Ape is an adventure module for the Dungeons & Dragons role-playing game World of Greyhawk campaign setting, in which the events occur in a magical demiplane of the same name created by the mad archmage Zagyg Yragerne.

== Plot overview ==
Isle of the Ape is a scenario in which the player characters encounter a gargantuan ape on an isolated island.

The module includes two new magic spells, and uses rules from the Unearthed Arcana rulebook.

According to From the Ashes, this adventure was set in a demiplane accessed via Castle Tenser.

== Publication history ==
Isle of the Ape, also referred to by its module code WG6, was written by Gary Gygax as a module for the 1st Edition Advanced Dungeons & Dragons role-playing game. It was published by TSR, Inc. in 1985 as a 48-page booklet with a two-color map and an outer folder. Because it is one of the WG modules, it is a module intended for the World of Greyhawk campaign setting. Its product code was TSR 9153. It is a challenging adventure intended for 18+ level characters and requires Unearthed Arcana for play. The adventure is loosely based on Skull Island in the story of King Kong. The module is used as an example of how to switch between vastly different magic levels within a campaign.

The Crook of Rao, a significant artifact found on the isle, is rediscovered in From the Ashes written by Carl Sargent and published by TSR in 1992. In addition, stock characters from the module reappear in Return of the Eight written by Roger E. Moore and published by Wizards of the Coast in 1998.

Further history of the Isle of the Ape was revealed in Dungeon Issue #143, where the origins of the tribe residing on the isle are determined to originate from the Isle of Dread. A portal to the Isle of the Ape was added to Expedition to the Ruins of Greyhawk, written by Jason Bulmahn, James Jacobs, and Erik Mona and published by Wizards of the Coast in 2007.

=== Legal History ===
Isle of the Ape was one of many books named in a 1992 lawsuit between TSR and Game Designers' Workshop regarding the Dangerous Journeys role-playing game and various rulebooks/sourcebooks designed for that game. One section of this lawsuit argued that "The Multiverse adventure concept in Mythus ... and Mythus Magick ... is derived from the Multiverse system found in the AD&D 1st ed. Dungeon Master's Guide (pages 40, ...) ... the AD&D Isle of the Ape game module (throughout, but particularly, pages 2-3, 6 and 8); ..."
