= Castle Greyhawk (module) =

Dungeons & Dragons adventure module

- Code: WG7
- Rules required: 1st edition AD&D
- Character levels: 0 - 25
- Campaign setting: Greyhawk
- Authors: Various
- First published: 1988

Linked modules
- WG - World of Greyhawk

Castle Greyhawk is a comedic adventure module for the Dungeons & Dragons fantasy roleplaying game set in the World of Greyhawk campaign setting. The module bears the code WG7 and was published by TSR, Inc. in 1988 for the first edition Advanced Dungeons & Dragons rules.

== Plot summary ==
Castle Greyhawk is a large adventure scenario in multiple parts, consisting of eleven dungeon levels underneath Greyhawk Castle presented in a humorous style.

== Publication history ==
WG7 Castle Greyhawk was edited by Mike Breault with Jon Pickens, with a cover by Keith Parkinson and interior illustrations by Jeff Easley and Jim Holloway, and was published by TSR in 1988 as a 128-page book.

The designers of this twelve level dungeon were each given a single level to develop.

Shannon Appelcline noted that John Nephew had been contributing to Dragon and Dungeon, and that "As he continued to write for the magazines, he was also invited to contribute to larger projects such as Kara-Tur: The Eastern Realms (1988) and WG7: Castle Greyhawk (1988)."

== Theme ==
In Castle Greyhawk, TSR parodied its own scenario style, as a send-up of the illogical "gilded hole" labyrinth dungeons. The product contains many references to contemporary popular culture, along with a bitingly satirical treatment of TSR's approach to earlier Greyhawk publications. The module's back cover states "The common theme of this dungeon is that no joke is so old, no pun is so bad, and no schtick is so obvious that it can't be used to confuse and trip up PCs!"

Thus, although the adventure purportedly concerns Castle Greyhawk, Shannon Appelcline states that "this adventure definitely is not Gygax's Castle Greyhawk. In fact, this satirical adventure isn't really a World of Greyhawk adventure, despite its "WG" product code. TSR purposefully superseded it just a few years later." In 1990, TSR released a more definitive and serious treatment of the Castle itself in module WGR1 Greyhawk Ruins. Greyhawk Ruins was a serious attempt to match the style of Gygax's original work, though it also did not directly derive from Gygax's dungeon. Greyhawk: The Adventure Begins, one of the late 1990s Greyhawk publications meant to revamp the campaign world, explicitly states that Greyhawk Ruins is to be considered the definitive castle layout and not Castle Greyhawk.

== Reception ==
Ken Rolston reviewed Castle Greyhawk for Dragon magazine No. 135 (July 1988), and described it as a light-hearted treasure "for gamers with a sense of humor". Rolston felt that publishing an anthology of "really low fantasy" scenarios dignified the style of play involving "this sort of bizarre, humorous, incoherent fantasy arcade adventure, where DMs took the totally illogical premises of the D&D and AD&D games, accepted them without question, then improvised thinly rationalized dungeon universes for us to wander about in, smashing and roasting things and having a thumping good time".

Fan reception of Castle Greyhawk was mixed but generally negative. Many dedicated fans of the Greyhawk setting were bitterly disappointed by the long-awaited work. Some interpreted the publication as being a direct insult to Gary Gygax, who had recently left TSR in a dispute over ownership of the company, and by extension to early fans of the setting and D&D players in general. These issues continue to be discussed and debated on various fan sites and chat rooms.

Castle Greyhawk was a Gamer's Choice award-winner. Lawrence Schick, in his 1991 book Heroic Worlds, described it as a "send-up of illogical 'gilded hole' labyrinths' and considered the dungeon levels "silly-but-playable", cited its "all-star design staff", and called Parkinson's cover "marvelous".

Game designer John D. Ratecliff wrote in an article published on the Wizards of the Coast website:

Despite being intended in fun, the unrelenting mayhem of Dungeonland and The Land Beyond the Magic Mirror creates a sense of bedlam, and the parody element opened the door for the later WG7, Castle Greyhawk (1988) -- thought by some at the time to be a deliberate attempt by TSR to destroy Gygax's reputation in the wake of his departure from the company. The truth, especially given the freelance talent involved, is more likely to be that someone thought it a good idea at the time. They were wrong. Castle Greyhawk's assortment of villains -- Col. Sanders, the Pillsbury Doughboy, the cast of Star Trek, and others -- would be more in keeping with a bad episode of Scooby Doo than a dungeon crawl. Unfortunately, the Castle Greyhawk collection of unconnected parody adventures tainted the mystique of D&D's original dungeon so badly that not even the astonishingly deadly killer dungeon presented slightly later in WGR1. Greyhawk Ruins (1990) could reclaim its lost prestige.

== Table of contents ==
Chapter	Designer	page
What's Happening Now at Castle Greyhawk	by Chris Mortika	2
Level 1: Against the Little Guys	by Steve Gilbert	12
Level 2: It's My Party and I'll Die if I Want to	by Rick Swan	21
Level 3: Too Many Cooks	by Guy McLimore, Greg Poehlein, and David Tepool	32
Level 4: There's No Place Like Up	by Jennell Jaquays (Note: Credited as Paul Jaquays.)	44
Level 5: The Name of the Game	by John Terra	54
Level 6: The Temple of Really Bad Dead Things	by Greg Gorden	63
Level 7: Queen of the Honeybee Hive	by Grant Boucher and Kurt Wenz	73
Level 8 : Of Kings and Colonels	by John Nephew	83
Level 9: Vices 'N Virtues	by Scott Bennie	92
Level 10: Fluffy Goes Down the Drain	by Rick Reid	102
Level 11: Mordenkainen's Movie Madness	by Ray Winninger	111
Level 12: Where the Random Monsters Roam	by Steve Perrin	119

== Credits ==
Editing: Mike Breault with Jon Pickens
Cover Art: Keith Parkinson
Interior Art: Jim Holloway with Jeff Easley
Typography: Kim Janke
Cartography : Stephen Sullivan
Keylining: Stephanie Tabat and Dave S. LaForce

== Notable nonplayer characters ==
- Herzog Akitrom
- Poppinfarsh the Dough Golem
- The Three Cooks: Molenhowad, Larifyne, and Kurlenshembes
- Gingerbread Man
- Inflated Ego
- Miss Gulch
- Ye Secret Tom of Inestimable Knowledges
- Driderman, The Inedible Bulk, Da Ting,
- Captain Kork, Mees Taspark, Bones
- Indiana Gnome
- Prof. Why, Baba Yaga
- Elfin John
- Hack and Slash
- Captain Cheer Eo—both a parody of the bee mascot of Honey Nut Cheerios and Michael Jackson's role as Captain Eo in the Disneyland attraction of the same name
- Marvin Grape
- Aunt Bee
- Tela Vision, Bunny
- Gross Profits, Net Profits, Profits of Doom
- Jak Briddon
- Penny & Fluffy
- Crystal Lite Ooze
- Mordenkainen
- Voyeux

== See also ==
- List of Dungeons & Dragons modules
