= Castle Greyhawk =

Dungeons & Dragons dungeon setting

Castle Greyhawk as shown on the cover of Greyhawk Ruins (TSR, Inc., 1990); Cover art by Fred Fields

Castle Greyhawk is one of the central dungeon settings in the fictional World of Greyhawk campaign setting for the Dungeons & Dragons roleplaying game. The Castle was originally developed by Gary Gygax, for his own campaign and later detailed for publication. Castle Greyhawk is also the name of a 1988 Dungeons & Dragons adventure module that created a treatment of the Castle for the public to use. In 2005, Gygax announced the release of "Castle Zagyg," his new treatment of the dungeon.

== Location ==
Castle Greyhawk lies north and slightly east of the Free City of Greyhawk, overlooking the Grey Run River. The Free City of Greyhawk is located centrally in the Flanaess, the eastern portion of the continent of Oerik, the greatest of Oerth's four continents.

== History of the Castle ==
The Castle was constructed CY c.320 by the wizard Zagig Yragerne. Known as "The Mad Archmage," Zagig ruled over the Free City of Greyhawk from the Castle for approximately the next 100 years, after which he abandoned the Castle and mysteriously disappeared.

Over the centuries, the Castle's three towers decayed into ruin. The main tower is called the "Tower of Zagig," and the two lesser towers are the "War Tower" and the "Tower of Magic" (alternately "The Power Tower"). An extensive dungeon complex lies below the towers.

In the initial years after the Castle was abandoned, few if any adventurers approached the Castle because of rumors that it lay under a powerful curse. Eventually, a group of Northern barbarians forayed into the area and pillaged a large amount of treasure. The story of their success attracted groups of Dwarves, Elves, and other adventurers to the area, and over time the Castle's dungeons became a major site for adventuring on the Flanaess. The influx of trade, travelers, and treasure associated with this phenomenon has provided significant economic benefits to the nearby City of Greyhawk.

Sometime during this period, Zagig reappeared and managed to imprison the demon lord Fraz-Urb'luu in the dungeons beneath the castle. The fiend was imprisoned there for at least 200 years but was eventually freed by a wizard and a cleric (probably Erac's Cousin and his adventuring companion Ayelerach).

In CY 505, Zagig then captured and imprisoned the evil demigod Iuz in the dungeons beneath the Castle. Iuz was one of nine demigods so trapped, and this accomplishment was instrumental in Zagig's ascension to become the demigod now known as Zagyg. Other deities imprisoned in the dungeon included Merikka, Rudd, and Wastri. The remaining five demigods have never been canonically identified, although the Living Greyhawk Gazetteer states that the nine were of "opposing alignments."

Because Zouken is known to be imprisoned somewhere on the central Flanaess, some believe he was one of the nine deities Zagig trapped at the Castle. Noncanonical lists of the other demigods have been offered by Gary Gygax himself, other early D&D notables such as Robert J. Kuntz, and in various works of fan fiction, although many of these lists cannot be reconciled with the (now canon) "opposing alignments" criteria noted above.

In Expedition to the Ruins of Greyhawk published in 2007, Zuoken was officially confirmed to be one of the canonical deities imprisoned. According to the module, when Iuz was freed, the other gods effected an escape except for Zuoken who remained imprisoned. By the end of the adventure, Zuoken has been freed, Robilar who had been replaced by an evil double is back to his old self, and Castle Greyhawk is now some sort of multi-planar brigadoon.

In CY 570, the warrior Robilar freed Iuz from his prison, and subsequently most or all of the other eight demigods escaped as well.

Note: The 1992 publication From the Ashes (FtA) provides some contradictory dates to those given above. First, it states that construction of the Castle did not begin until CY 375. The adventure module Greyhawk Ruins, however, provides the CY 320 reference for the start of construction. Greyhawk Ruins is both an earlier work and more specifically focused on the Castle itself, and thus would seem to be a more definitive source. Second, FtA suggests both CY 505 and CY 507 as dates for Iuz's initial imprisonment. Given that all other references to Iuz's imprisonment in official game publications use the CY 505 date, the CY 507 anomaly is usually considered to be an error.

== Known levels ==
=== The Tower of Magic ===
- Surface ruins. The surface ruins are mostly abandoned. They include a temple to Boccob, barracks, storerooms, mess halls, and guest quarters. A large band of kobolds currently dwells in the southern half of this ruin, and elves guard the entrance. During Castle Greyhawk's heyday, the Regalia of Neutrality were evidently stored in the Temple of Boccob here and were the goal of countless pilgrimages. They are now gone, but something of their power still remains. This level is coded P100 in Greyhawk Ruins.
- Zagig's Gauntlet (P200). This is a twisted maze designed by Zagig to vent his eccentricities, test the mettle of his apprentices, and guard the crypts below.
- The Ochre Crypts (P300). This level contains the crypts of Zagig's apprentices and family members. Living as he did for hundreds of years, he outlived a lot of people. The stonework is a distinctive ochre hue. Expedition to the Ruins of Greyhawk removed the passageway that led to stairs from the surface ruins, connecting the crypts only to Zagig's Gauntlet.
- Apprentice's Walk (P400). This level was originally built as dormitories for Zagig's apprentices. For a time this and many other of the levels beneath the Tower of Magic were used for an experiment conducted by the Ring of Five on the impact of magic on the three philosophies of evil. Staircase 2 in the surface ruins has evidently been changed in Expedition to the Ruins of Castle Greyhawk to lead here instead of to the Ochre Crypts, while staircase 4 on this level has evidently been changed to lead from either the surface ruins or Zagig's Gauntlet instead of from the crypts.
- The Sanctum Arcanum (P500). This level is a complex of classrooms and laboratories.
- The Vaults of Creation (P600). This level was intended for golem creation and research but was never finished. The map was changed extensively between Greyhawk Ruins and Expedition to the Ruins of Greyhawk, but a few of the rooms match up. P612 matches F12, P601 matches F11, and P602 matches F15, but the destinations of the staircases and tunnels leading from those rooms have been altered or blocked.
- Master's Walk. These were Zagig's personal workshops and libraries.

== Publication history ==
Gary Gygax designed Castle Greyhawk as a locale for the amusement of his children and friends and as a testing ground for the game of Dungeons & Dragons that he developed with Dave Arneson during 1972/73. Dungeon levels were written at the rate of one per week as those adventures progressed, leading to the original thirteen-level castle.

In those early days there was no "Flanaess" surrounding the castle; Gygax's world map of "Oerth" was simply drawn over a map of North America.

A second version of Castle Greyhawk was developed/created prior to the publication of Dungeons & Dragons by incorporating Rob Kuntz's "El Raja Key" (also commenced in 1972), which had been created to allow Gygax to adventure using his own PCs such as Mordenkainen.

In 1975, TSR, Inc. published the Greyhawk supplement to the original Dungeons & Dragons rules, although this booklet provided no significant detail regarding Castle Greyhawk itself.

Later on, Gygax developed the area around this new version of his castle and Greyhawk City to include new cities and countries as needed, expanding to a surrounding area of around 50 miles mapped in depth and approximately ten times that far in outline form by 1976.

In 1978, TSR began publishing adventure modules set in the World of Greyhawk, although these early adventures did not directly concern the castle. Similarly, TSR's The World of Greyhawk 1980 folio and 1983 World of Greyhawk boxed set provided information regarding the campaign setting at large, but no detail regarding Castle Greyhawk.

Between 1983 and 1985, TSR published three modules linked to Castle Greyhawk. These were the 1983 adventure Dungeonland and its sequel The Land Beyond the Magic Mirror, as well as 1985's Isle of the Ape. All three were originally conceived by Gygax as extra-planar extensions of the dungeons below Castle Greyhawk. As published, however, the modules again provided no information regarding the castle itself or its dungeons.

The castle was first detailed for the general public in 1988 in TSR's adventure Castle Greyhawk. However, as the module was steeped in humor and featured numerous references to 20th-century culture (such as the character the Amazing Drider-Man), most Greyhawk fans consider the module to be a "joke-version" of Castle Greyhawk.

In 1989 The City of Greyhawk boxed set expanded on the detail available for the Free City of Greyhawk and its environs for the second edition D&D rules. The castle itself received only a minor mention.

The castle finally received serious treatment in 1990, when TSR published Greyhawk Ruins, a 128-page adventure that examined the castle in great detail.

In 2005, Troll Lord Games began publishing "Castle Zagyg" in a number of volumes authored by Gary Gygax and Jeffery P. Talanian. The Castle Zagyg series is written for the Castles and Crusades game, an OGL game derived from Dungeons & Dragons. These adventures are based on Gygax's original Castle Greyhawk dungeon design and campaign but are not official D&D materials.

In August 2007, Wizards of the Coast released Expedition to the Ruins of Greyhawk, a 224-page hardcover book that revisits the material from Greyhawk Ruins and updates the site for 3.5 edition D&D rules.
