= Greyhawk (disambiguation) =

Greyhawk can refer to:

- Grey hawk, a smallish raptor found in open country and forest edges in the Americas
- Greyhawk, a campaign setting for the Dungeons & Dragons (D&D) roleplaying game
  - Greyhawk (supplement), a rulebook for the original edition of the Dungeons & Dragons role-playing game
  - Castle Greyhawk, one of the original locations in the setting
  - Free City of Greyhawk, the city from which the Greyhawk setting takes its name
  - Greyhawk dragon, a type of fictional dragon from the Greyhawk campaign setting, also called "Steel dragons" in other D&D settings
  - Greyhawk was the original name for the Troika-developed The Temple of Elemental Evil (video game)
