= EX2 =

EX2 may refer to:

- (20003) 1991 EX2, a minor planet
- The Expendables 2, a 2012 film
- The King of Fighters EX2: Howling Blood, a 2003 video game
- Street Fighter EX2, a 1998 video game
- Facel Vega Excellence EX2, a luxury car
- Geely EX2, a battery electric subcompact hatchback
- EX2, a postcode district in the EX postcode area
- EX2 - The Land Beyond the Magic Mirror, a 1983 Advanced Dungeons and Dragons fantasy adventure module
