= List of Greyhawk deities =

This is a list of deities from the Greyhawk campaign setting for the Dungeons & Dragons fantasy role-playing game.

== A ==
=== Al'Akbar ===
Al'Akbar is the Baklunish demigod of dignity, duty, faithfulness, and guardianship. His symbol is a cup and eight-pointed star, images of the legendary Cup and Talisman that now bear his name. Al'Akbar is subordinate to the other Baklunish gods, remaining a mere demigod out of respect for them. His faithful oppose the sadistic elemental cults of Ull. Al'Akbar is allied with Heironeous. Al'Akbar's priests use the Cup and Talisman as metaphors for the good life, urging their flocks to be vessels of kindness and emblems of devotion.

Al'Akbar was the most exalted high priest in what are now the lands of the Paynims. After the Invoked Devastation, during that time of misery and suffering, he was given the Cup and Talisman by Al'Asran to help heal his people's ills and return them to the traditional Baklunish faith. Al'Akbar founded the city of Ekbir and, for the last decade of his mortal life, ruled the nation of Ekbir as the first of its caliphs. Eventually he had a mosque to himself built and allowed his followers to call on his name in their prayers. Soon after, he ascended to the heavens to take his place among the gods. Al'Akbar is revered primarily in Ekbir, Ket, the Plains of the Paynims, Tusmit, and Zeif.

"Akbar" was first mentioned in The Strategic Review #7, wherein Neal Healey described The Cup and Talisman of Akbar [sic], and associated them with worship of Allah without mention of whether "Akbar" (Arabic for "greater"/"greatest") was a person, place, or descriptor.

=== Allitur ===
Allitur is the Flan god of Ethics and Propriety. His holy symbol is a pair of clasped hands. Allitur was first detailed for the Dungeons & Dragons game in the World of Greyhawk Fantasy Game Setting (1983), by Gary Gygax. Allitur is depicted as a Flan man riding a horse, Keph, who never tires. Allitur's realm is Empyrea, The City of Tempered Souls. Empyrea sits on the edge of a cold, clear mountain lake on Mount Celestia's fifth layer, Mertion. The many healing fountains and curative waters in Empyrea can restore withered limbs, lost speech, derangement, and life energy itself; those who ail need only find the right fountain. Empyrea is also known for its healers and hospitals, and many a pilgrim seeks to reach this legendary site of perfect health. Allitur teaches respect and understanding for laws, rituals, and other cultural traditions.

=== Atroa ===
Atroa (ah-TRO-ah) is the Oeridian goddess of Spring, East Wind, and Renewal. Her holy symbol is a heart with an air-glyph within, or a kara tree full of ripe, red fruit. Atroa was first detailed for the Dungeons & Dragons game in the World of Greyhawk Fantasy Game Setting (1983), by Gary Gygax. Atroa appears as a fresh-faced blonde woman, often with an eagle perching upon her shoulder. With her sling Windstorm, she can strike the most distant foe, and with Readying's Dawn, her spherical glass talisman, she is able to melt all ice in sight. Atroa's realm, the Grove of Perpetual Spring, is in the layer of Brux in the Beastlands. She is also thought to spend time in the realm of Morninglory in Elysium. As Goddess of Spring, Atroa is the invigorating breath that awakens the world from its slumber. She gives the world new love and new life, renews old friendships, and plucks the heartstrings of lovers, travelers, and poets.

=== Azor'alq ===
Azor'alq is the Baklunish hero-deity of Light, Purity, Courage, and Strength. His symbol is an armed man standing atop a stone summit. Azor'alq is a tall, handsome warrior with a dark complexion. He wears fine chain mail and his helm is topped with peacock feathers. His long curved sword, of elven make, is known as Faruk. Azor'alq is a member of the Baklunish pantheon. In the past, he has been a foe of the demon lords Munkir and Nekir. Azor'alq's sanctum can be entered through the highest peak in the Pinnacles of Azor'alq. There he dwells with his ancient paladins, the Thousand Immortals.

== B ==
=== Beltar ===
Beltar is the Suel goddess of Malice, Caves, and Pits. Her holy symbol is a set of opened fangs poised to bite. Although often depicted as a haglike human female, Beltar is known to also appear as a beholder, red dragon, or marilith. Some regard the later form as a likely cause of rumors of the existence of a Suloise snake-cult. Beltar was formerly a goddess of earth and mines, but was supplanted by other Suel gods until her only worshipers were nonhuman slaves. It is perhaps for this reason that Jascar is one of her greatest enemies. Beltar will often take mates in her various forms, but few survive, as she eats them afterward, as well as any young born from such a union.

=== Beory ===
Beory is the Flan goddess of the Oerth, Nature, and Rain. She is also known as the Oerth Mother. Her symbol is either a green disk marked with a circle or a rotund, female figurine. Beory was first detailed for the Dungeons & Dragons game in the World of Greyhawk Fantasy Game Setting (1983), by Gary Gygax. Beory is considered to be a manifestation of the Oerth itself. She does not care for anything else, and mortals or other deities only concern her if they threaten the Oerth. She is distant even from her own clerics, who wander the earth to experience the different parts of the world. They spend their time communing with nature and often associate with druids.

=== Berei ===
Berei is goddess of Agriculture, Family, and Home. Her holy symbol is a sheaf of wheat stalks. Berei was first detailed for the Dungeons & Dragons game in the World of Greyhawk Fantasy Game Setting (1983), by Gary Gygax. Berei is depicted as a brown-skinned, kindly-looking woman carrying a sickle. Berei can most often be found in the first layer of Elysium, in the realm of Principality. Berei tries to strengthen the ties of family and community, and urges care in the planting of crops.

=== Berna ===
Berna is the Touv goddess of passion and forgiveness. Formerly, she was the goddess of hatred and vendettas, but she got better. Her symbol is a red metal heart, preferably red gold. Berna is depicted as a Touv woman wearing the skin of a jungle cat. A red-gold heart shines from her chest. Berna is the third child of the serpent god Meyanok, transformed by the power of Xanag from a spirit of hate to one of passion. Her older siblings are Vara and Damaran. Her grandmother is Breeka and her great-grandmother is the sun goddess Nola, who was awakened by the creator god Uvot. She is a member of the Touv pantheon, which also includes the gods Katay, Kundo, Meyanok, and Vogan. Berna is now the patron of all small emotions, both positive and negative. She also represents the forgiveness of wrongs.

Berna is named for a college friend of Sean K. Reynolds's named Bernadette.

=== Bleredd ===
Bleredd is the Oeridian god of Metal, Mines, and Smiths. His holy symbol is an iron mule, as sturdy and patient as himself. Bleredd was first detailed for the Dungeons & Dragons game in the World of Greyhawk Fantasy Game Setting (1983), by Gary Gygax. Bleredd is the one who originally taught the Oeridians iron-working. He is a pragmatic sort, preferring work to idle talk. He created many of the artifacts used by his family, including his hammer of thunderbolts, Fury, and his wife's hammer Skull Ringer. In Bleredd's creed, the gifts of the earth exist to be taken and used to create practical works. Bleredd's followers are expected to be strong of body and will. Bleredd encourages the free flow of information; the knowledge of smithcraft should never be hoarded, but taught freely to anyone with a talent for it. Those who are miserly in sharing what they have learned ought to be punished.

=== Boccob ===
Boccob is the god of magic, arcane knowledge, balance, and foresight. He is known as the Uncaring, the Lord of All Magic, and the Archmage of the Deities. All times and places are open to him, and he has visited many alternate realities and planes unknown to the wisest of sages, places even the Elder Evils avoid. His symbol is an eye in a pentagon; usually this is worn as an amulet. Boccob was first detailed for the Dungeons & Dragons game in "The Deities and Demigods of the World of Greyhawk" by Gary Gygax in Dragon #70 (1983). Boccob is usually portrayed as a middle aged man with white hair who wears purple robes decorated with golden runes. He is described as carrying the very first staff of the magi with him at all times. In addition, he knows every spell ever created and can travel to any time and dimension. He is the possessor of the only magical library that contains a copy of every potion, spell, and magic item in existence.

=== Bralm ===
Bralm is the Suel goddess of Insects and Industriousness. Her symbol is a giant wasp in front of an insect swarm. Bralm was first detailed for the Dungeons & Dragons game in the World of Greyhawk Fantasy Game Setting (1983), by Gary Gygax. Bralm's realm, known as the Hive Fortress, is in the Infernal Battlefield of Acheron, in the layer of Avalas. Bralm teaches that everyone in society has their proper position that people are obligated to master even if they don't understand their importance in the greater scheme. She instructs her followers to obey those with higher social positions and greater knowledge. She urges contentment in hard labor, and compares her followers to insects in a hive.

=== Breeka ===
Breeka is the Touv goddess of Living Things. Her holy symbol is a headdress of wooden beads and animal teeth. Breeka is the manifestation of all aspects of nature, both helpful and harmful (unlike her grandfather Uvot, who represents only nature's bounty). Breeka is, by turns, helpful, indifferent, and harmful. She is troubled by the nightmares given to her by Vara. She is depicted as a middle-aged Touv woman with dark green skin and worry lines on her face. Breeka is the daughter of Nola, goddess of the sun, and Vogan, the god of weather and rain, and from this mixture of rain and sunlight was born all the world's plants and animals. She is the mother of Katay, who has no father. Her birthing pains mingled with the darkness to create Meyanok, the god of evil. While sleeping, she vomited forth the nightmares inspired in her by her granddaughter Vara to create the living things that bring fear and danger to the night.

== C ==
=== Celestian ===
Celestian is the god of Stars, Space and Wanderers. His symbol is a black circle set with seven stars. His color is black. An Oeridian god, he is called the Far Wanderer, and is brother to Fharlanghn. It is said that the two followed similar but differing paths. Celestian is Neutral Good, but his worshipers may be any alignment of good. Celestian was first detailed for the Dungeons & Dragons game in "The Deities and Demigods of the World of Greyhawk" by Gary Gygax in Dragon #68 (1982). Celestian encourages his followers to wander far from home, just as the stars do. Astrology is as much a part of Celestian's faith as astronomy is, and his worshippers are encouraged to discover the secrets within the patterns of the stars and other celestial bodies.

Compare Celestian to the Roman god Caelus, especially in his form as Caelus Nocturnus. The names Celestian and Caelus both derive from the Latin word caelum meaning "sky" or "heavens".

=== Charmalaine ===
Charmalaine (TCHAR-mah-lain) is the halfling hero-goddess of Keen Senses and Narrow Escapes. She gained her nickname "the Lucky Ghost" from her ability to leave her body to scout ahead in spirit-form. In this form, she is believed to warn halfling adventurers of impending danger. Her holy symbol is a burning boot-print. Charmalaine is a young halfling woman with alert eyes, black oiled leather armor, and boots coated in mud. She carries a mace called Fair Warning and is usually seen with Xaphan, her ferret familiar. She is energetic, spontaneous, and fearless. Charmalaine preaches vigilance and attention to one's environment. Her followers are urged to hone their reflexes, to be quick on their feet, to enjoy exploration but also safety. They are taught that too many material things can be too much weight.

=== Cyndor ===
Cyndor is the Oeridian god of Time, Infinity, and Continuity. His symbol is a rounded hourglass set on its side, much like the symbol for infinity. Cyndor was first detailed for the Dungeons & Dragons game in the World of Greyhawk Fantasy Game Setting (1983), by Gary Gygax. Cyndor is depicted as a towering, featureless humanoid with powerful block-like limbs. This form symbolizes the inevitability of time itself. Cyndor directs Merikka in her tasks. It is thought that Tsolorandril is his servant. Cyndor's faithful believe in predestination. All time, for them, is a path along a lifeline that Cyndor has already foreseen. Cyndor directs a small group of mortal chronomancers known as the Guardians of Infinity. Their duty is to defend Oerth's timestreams from interference or damage by outside forces. Cyndor is also served by temporal dogs, time dimensionals, and more exotic beings.

== D ==
=== Daern ===
Daern is the Oeridian hero-deity of defenses and fortifications. Daern's holy symbol is a shield hanging from a parapet. She is often associated with griffins. Daern's priests often advise military leaders on proper placement and construction of fortifications, castles, and keeps. Her priests are valued among rulers who wish to establish stronger borders. The priesthood favors the shortspear. In her mortal life, Daern was responsible for the construction of a number of famous fortifications, including Castle Blazebane in Almor and Tarthax near Rel Deven.

=== Dalt ===
Dalt is the Suel god of Portals, Doors, Enclosures, Locks, and Keys. His holy symbol is a locked door with a skeleton key beneath it. Dalt wanders the Outlands, having no permanent realm of his own. Dalt is depicted as either a white-haired old man with piercing eyes or as a young red-haired thief. Dalt is a lesser deity, almost forgotten on the world of Oerth but slowly gaining more followers. He is primarily worshipped by the Suloise people in the southeastern Flanaess.

=== Damaran ===
Damaran is the Touv god of vermin and other creeping things, as well as the flight-instinct essential to survival. His symbol is ribbons of black metal. Damaran is the vermin that scuttles. He is depicted as a strong Touv man with a skulking look about him, accompanied by rats and insects. Damaran obeys his father, Meyanok, unquestioningly, and is easily bullied into service by his older sister Vara. He often flees when confronted by enemies of any strength. The Touv gods inhabit the "spirit world" coterminous with the realms of the Touv, a somewhat hypothetical realm.

=== Daoud ===
Daoud is a hero-deity whose ethos is Humility, Clarity, and Immediacy. The symbol of Daoud appears as a multi-colored cloth patch or a tangle of yarn, having seven threads consisting of one thread for each color in the spectrum, and extending upwards from the bottom. He usually appears as a leather-skinned old man whose brows are dark and heavy. Daoud has black, piercing eyes. His clothing is simple and worn, like that of a shepherd, with a turban around his head, and he carries a staff. Daoud urges his followers to seek both the good and fortune to unravel every thread of destiny. His followers strive to find contentment only with whatever Fate allows and demands from them. His followers are able to cut through lies using sharp words.

=== Delleb ===
Delleb is the Oeridian god of Reason, Intellect, and Study. His symbol is a phoenix-feather quill, or an open book. Delleb was first detailed for the Dungeons & Dragons game in the World of Greyhawk Fantasy Game Setting (1983), by Gary Gygax. Delleb's realm, the Great Library, is in Solania, the fourth of the Seven Heavens. Solania is a place with many scholarly hermitages and monasteries hidden atop high, steep peaks. Delleb's order teaches that the purpose of existence is the accumulation of knowledge, although they are careful to remind others that this does not supersede the sanctity of life.

== E ==
=== Earth Dragon ===
The Earth Dragon is a Flan spirit of earth, weather, and hidden treasures. It is the spirit of Mount Drachenkopf in the Pomarj. Its symbol is a coiled dragon. The Earth Dragon may manifest as a mottled serpent or a gargantuan dragon formed of variegated stone laced with precious ores. It may also manifest as an earthquake to indicate its displeasure. The Cult of the Earth Dragon is opposed by the Silent Ones. The Earth Dragon is said to live in a large underground lair beneath Mount Drachenkopf avoided by subterranean races. Especially faithful worshippers are brought to their deity's presence to bask in the Earth Dragon's glory. The Earth Dragon is the great provider and the spirit of the earth. Those who worship it and obey it are promised protection. The Earth Dragon is said to know all the secrets of the land, favoring its chosen with power and knowledge. To please their god, the faithful must worship, sacrifice, and spread the faith to others.

=== Ehlonna ===
Ehlonna is the goddess of Forests, Woodlands, Flora, Fauna, and Fertility. Ehlonna is known to the elves as "Ehlenestra." Her holy symbol is a rampant unicorn or a unicorn's horn. Ehlonna was first detailed for the Dungeons & Dragons game in "The Deities and Demigods of the World of Greyhawk" by Gary Gygax in Dragon #68 (1982). Ehlonna is variously depicted as an elven or human woman, and often associates with unicorns and other sylvan creatures. Deep within the Beastlands layer of Krigala is the Grove of the Unicorns, a realm she shares with the like-minded goddess Mielikki. Ehlonna teaches that the animals and plants of the forests are gifts, and are not to be stolen. She is often the goddess of rangers and druids and opposes hunters and anyone who would exploit the land for fun or profit.

Environmental studies scholar Matthew Chrulew contrasted the good-aligned Ehlonna with neutral Obad-Hai as corresponding "to two opposed modern conceptions of "nature"": Ehlonna's support for interventions against threats to the woodlands aligns with "the values of environmentalism", while Obad-Hai's more isolationst ideal of living "in harmony with the natural world" is "a perspective more in line with deep ecology".

=== Erythnul ===
Erythnul is the Oeridian god of hate, envy, malice, panic, ugliness, and slaughter. He is known as the Many, and is worshipped by many gnoll, troll, ogre, and bugbear tribes, in addition to humans. His symbol is a red blood drop, or a bestial mask representing Erythnul's changing visage. Erythnul was first detailed for the Dungeons & Dragons game in "The Deities and Demigods of the World of Greyhawk" by Gary Gygax in Dragon #71 (1983). Erythnul is called the Many, because in battle his features continually shift from human to bugbear to troll to ogre to gnoll and back to human again. His spilled blood transforms into similar creatures. Erythnul delights in panic and slaughter. He can spread fear through his eyes.

== F ==
=== Fharlanghn ===
Fharlanghn, the Dweller on the Horizon, is the Oeridian god of Horizons, Distance, Travel, and Roads. He is a well-known deity on the world of Oerth. He wanders that world in person, his petitioners present in spirit form at crossroads and in mysterious oases. His symbol is a disk with a curved line representing the horizon, and an upturned crescent above that. He is the brother of Celestian, and is said to make his home on Oerth. Fharlanghn was first detailed for the Dungeons & Dragons game in "The Deities and Demigods of the World of Greyhawk" by Gary Gygax in Dragon #68 (December 1982). Fharlanghn appears as an elderly man. His skin is wrinkled and weathered, but his green eyes sparkle with life. He wears unremarkable, travel-stained clothing of leather and unbleached linen. He carries the Oerth Disc, a magical version of his holy symbol. Fharlanghn insists that everyone travel in order to discover and learn new things. He urges people to look to the horizon for inspiration.

=== Fortubo ===
Fortubo is the god of Stone, Metals, Mountains, and Guardianship. Originally a member of the Suel pantheon, Fortubo abandoned the Suloise upon discovering that the Suel were behind the creation of the derro. Fortubo now favors dwarves above any other race, and has relatively few human worshippers. Fortubo's holy symbol is a warhammer with a glowing head, though any hammer will serve. Fortubo was first detailed for the Dungeons & Dragons game in the World of Greyhawk Fantasy Game Setting (1983), by Gary Gygax.

== G ==
=== Gadhelyn ===
Gadhelyn the Archer (Gad-THEL-en) is the elven hero-god of Independence, Outlawry, Feasting, and Hunting. His symbol is a leaf-shaped arrowhead. Gadhelyn is a very old figure in elven myth, once a part of the Fey Mysteries but now largely forgotten except among the grugach. He is depicted as an elf with sharp features, long yellow hair, and vivid green eyes. He wears rough clothing of fur and hide, of colors to match the season. Gadhelyn is still a potent hero among the grugach. Sylvan elves and even a few half-elves and humans revere him and participate in his rites. Followers of Gadhelyn prey on the wealthy who dare to cross their woodlands, but they are not truly dangerous unless attacked, or if their forests are despoiled.

=== Gendwar Argrim ===
Gendwar Argrim is the dwarven hero-god of Fatalism and Obsession. His symbol is a waraxe bearing the dwarven rune for destruction. The Doomed Dwarf's appearance is said to be unremarkable except for his sandy blond hair and beard. His dwarven waraxe, Forgotten Hope, screams every time a community of dwarves is attacked. He is in many ways the picture of a dwarven stereotype: dour, taciturn, and focused on the destruction of evil humanoids above all else. Gendwar preaches nothing less than utter destruction of the enemies of the dwarven race. Honor, glory, wealth, and love are all meaningless in the face of this crusade. His followers expect fully to one day die in battle, but strive to take a thousand foes with them to the grave.

=== Geshtai ===
Geshtai is the Baklunish goddess of Lakes, Rivers, Wells, and Streams. Her symbol is a waterspout. Geshtai was first detailed for the Dungeons & Dragons game in the World of Greyhawk Fantasy Game Setting (1983), by Gary Gygax. Geshtai is depicted as a young Baklunish woman carrying a clay jug. She stands in a pool of water with Gumus, her fish companion.

== H ==
=== Heironeous ===
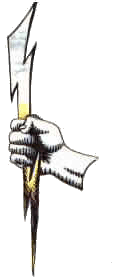
The holy symbol of Heironeous

In the World of Greyhawk campaign setting and the default pantheon of deities for the third edition of Dungeons & Dragons, Heironeous is the Lawful Good Oeridian god of Chivalry, Justice, Honor, War, Daring, and Valor. His clerics' domains are usually Glory, Good, Inquisition, Law, and War. His holy symbol is a silver lightning bolt, often clutched in a fist.

=== Heward ===
Heward is the god of Bards and Musicians. Heward is notable not only for his musical prowess, but also for his technological skills.

=== Hextor ===
Hextor is the Oeridian god of war, discord, massacres, conflict, fitness, and tyranny. Hextor was created by E. Gary Gygax, and was first detailed for the Advanced Dungeons & Dragons 1st Edition game in "The Deities and Demigods of the World of Greyhawk" by Gary Gygax in Dragon #67 (1982). Hextor is often depicted as a hideous, gray skinned, six-armed humanoid bearing two large tusks jutting from its lower jaw wearing armor clad with skulls. He wields a weapon in each hand: a spiked flail, a battle axe, a battle pick, a longsword, a mace, and a falchion. His other form is that of an athletic young male, with dark hair and light skin. Hextor's realm is the citadel of Scourgehold on the plane of Acheron.

== I ==
=== Incabulos ===
Incabulos is the god of plagues, sickness, famine, nightmares, drought, and disasters. His unholy symbol is the magic icon called the "Eye of Possession," a green eye in a red diamond. Incabulos was first detailed for the Dungeons & Dragons game in "The Deities and Demigods of the World of Greyhawk" by Gary Gygax in Dragon #71 (1983). Incabulos's appearance is said to be absolutely terrifying: a deformed body, skeletal hands, and a face from the worst nightmare. Incabulos hates all other gods except for Nerull, the death-god who finishes the work Incabulos starts. Incabulos regards him with total indifference. Incabulos's realm, known as Charnelhouse, is located on the first layer of the Gray Waste, Oinos.

=== Istus ===
Istus is the goddess of Fate, Destiny, Divination, and the Future. She is known as the Lady of Our Fate and the Colorless and All-Colored. Her symbol is a golden spindle with three strands.

=== Iuz ===
Iuz (pronounced YOOZ, EE-uz or EYE-ooze) is the chaotic evil demigod of Deceit, Evil, Oppression, Pain, and Wickedness. Iuz is variously called "The Old One" and "Old Wicked," among other titles. Unlike most Greyhawk deities, Iuz makes his home on Oerth, where he rules a broad swath of the Flanaess known as the Empire of Iuz. Iuz was also named as one of the greatest villains in D&D history by the final print issue of Dragon. His symbol is a grinning human skull, or a human skull with blood-red highlights. A long-established deity associated with Greyhawk, Iuz was created by E. Gary Gygax in his early Castle Greyhawk sessions in which Robert J. Kuntz's character, Robilar was responsible for releasing nine demi-gods. Iuz emerged as one of these demi-gods.

== J ==
=== Jascar ===
Jascar is the Suel god of Hills and Mountains, first detailed in the World of Greyhawk Fantasy Game Setting. His holy symbol is a snow-capped mountain peak. Jascar appears as a muscular human male with a dark beard and breastplate of shining silver. He lacks the color and features of the Suel race, despite his origins. His visage is said to strike terror into the hearts of goblins and orcs. He is sometimes depicted as a pegasus or a horse. He wields a great hammer, which is the bane of all undead. Jascar is the brother of Fortubo, and a close ally of Phaulkon. He is the sworn enemy of Beltar. Jascar associates little with other gods, who see him as driven and aloof.

=== Johydee ===
Johydee is the Oeridian goddess of Deception, Espionage, and Protection. Her sacred animal is the chameleon. Her symbol is a small stylized mask of onyx. Johydee can take any form, but usually appears as a young woman with grey eyes and honey-blonde hair. Though she comes off as mischievous and flighty, this is little more than a mask to hide her true intentions. Her allies are few, and she never sides with evil. Followers of Johydee are urged to protect themselves with many layers of deception, keeping their true intentions hidden from the knowledge of their enemies, and to know more of their foes than their foes know of them. They are taught to judge well the time to strike and the time to flee. They are also expected to help those they are sworn to protect.

=== Joramy ===
Joramy (also called the Raging Volcano and The Shrew) is the goddess of fire, volcanoes, wrath and anger. She is neutral, and even tending towards Neutral Good. Her holy symbol is a stylized volcano or pillar of flame.

== K ==
=== Katay ===
Katay is the Touv god of decay, inevitability, order, and time. His symbol is a copper disk. Katay is the inventor of the Touv Calendar, and records all events on a metallic wheel given to him by Xanag. Katay is depicted as an elderly man with young eyes, wearing a decaying animal pelt and carrying a great copper disk inscribed with Touv runes. Katay is the son of Breeka, born without a father.

=== Kelanen ===
Kelanen is the hero-deity of Swords, Sword Skills, and Balance. Possibly the most popular hero-deity in the Flanaess, Kelanen's symbol is nine swords arrayed in a star shape, points outward.

=== Keoghtom ===
Keoghtom is the hero-god of Secret Pursuits, Natural Alchemy, and Extraplanar Exploration. His symbol is a round disk, bisected by an upward-pointing arrow.

=== Keptolo ===
Keptolo (kep-toe-low) is the drow deity of drow males, expressed in flattery, intoxication, rumor, and opportunism. His symbol is a stylized mushroom, which symbolizes intoxication and male fertility. He is intelligent, stylish, and exquisitely decadent; in all ways he is the ideal of the upper class male drow. His typical appearance is that of a young dark elvish noble, dressed in elegant silks of red, purple, jet black, and amber hues. He carries on his person a thin and elegant poniard and longsword, and in combat he wields them both simultaneously. Alternatively, he may be dressed as if for a hunt, wearing a velvet cloak and carrying an expensive crossbow. Keptolo is the consort of Lolth. He is polite and unctuous to Kiaransalee and Vhaeraun, but insincere in his flattery. He despises Zinzerena, who tricked a portion of his power from him in order to empower her own ascension.

=== Kord ===
Kord is the Suel god of Athletics, Sports, Storms, Brawling, Strength, and Courage. His symbol is an eight-pointed star composed of spears and maces. Kord is depicted as a hugely muscular man with a red beard and long red hair. He wears a fighting girdle made from a red dragon's hide, gauntlets from a white dragon's hide, and boots from a blue dragon's hide. He wields the greatsword Kelmar in battle. Kord is sometimes depicted by his urbanized faithful as a more civilized athlete or wrestler. He is the son of Phaulkon and Syrul, and the grandson of Lendor. He is a foe of dragonkind, especially lawful evil dragons. Kord's favorite heralds are titans. His allies include eladrin and huge earth elementals. Kord is the most popular of Suel deities, and his followers are found throughout the Barbarian States of the Thillonrian Peninsula, northern Ulek, Keoland, Almor, Aerdy, Hepmonaland, the Amedio Jungle, Lendore Isle, and in the Bandit Kingdom city of Alhaster. Kord was first detailed for the Dungeons & Dragons game in the World of Greyhawk Fantasy Game Setting (1983), by Gary Gygax He was further detailed by Lenard Lakofka in Dragon #87 (1984), in the article Gods of the Suel Pantheon. He would go on to appear in 2nd and 3rd edition Dungeons and Dragons.

=== Kundo ===
Kundo is the Touv god of building, noise, music, and defense. His symbol is an ornate but functional shield or breastplate. Kundo is the union of storm and metal, a loud and boisterous guardian god obsessed with building and construction. He is the sound of metal on metal, or the roar of the summer rains on the roofs of shelters, or the happy songs sung by those who build and protect. He is depicted as a laughing Touv man carrying a great shield and a cluster of saplings. Kundo is the son of Xanag, goddess of metals, and Vogan, god of rain and storms. Xanag's beauty entranced Vonag.

=== Kurell ===
Kurell is the Oeridian god of Jealousy, Revenge, and Thievery. His holy symbol is a grasping hand holding a broken coin, fingers pointed upwards.

=== Kuroth ===
Kuroth is the Oeridian god of Theft and Treasure-Finding. Kuroth's symbol is a gold coin bearing the image of a key or a quill. Kuroth appears as an Oeridian man with a fancy mustache and medium-length black hair. He is occasionally accompanied by a ferret. Kuroth was sponsored to godhood by Olidammara. Kuroth's priests prefer daggers and rapiers.

=== Kyuss ===
Kyuss (pronounced "Kai-uhs" /ˈkaɪ.əs/) is a demigod concerned with the creation and mastery of the Undead. Known as the Bonemaster, the Wormgod, the Worm that Walks and the Herald of the Age of Worms, his symbol is a skull erupting with writhing green worms.

The sons of Kyuss, later referred to as spawn of Kyuss, were an iconic monster in the Dungeons & Dragons roleplaying game before the story of Kyuss was fleshed out. Kyuss was described as "an evil high priest who created the first of these creatures, via a special curse, under instruction from an evil deity" within their creature entry in the first edition Fiend Folio (1981). Kyuss is a lich in the adventure accompanying the album First Quest: The Music (1985). Hints at Kyuss's origins were added in the adventure Rary the Traitor (1992), when sons of Kyuss were said to be contained in the Necropolis of Unaagh, a cursed city of Sulm inhabited by undead. This was made more conspicuous since any of the contained undead that "move or are carried even a few yards from its buildings collapse into inanimate heaps of bone." This is suggested in the work to be the possible consequence of an ancient curse. That makes the creator of the undead ancient as well, painting Kyuss as once having been a high priest in Sulm.

In the From the Ashes boxed set (Atlas of the Flanaess, page 69), the entry for the Storm Lake of the Amedio mentioned that sons of Kyuss manifest in the vicinity after a phenomenon called the Storm of Unknowing. Later, in Iuz the Evil (1993) the home of the "infamous evil priest Kyuss" was claimed to have been the Wormcrawl Fissure, a "mile-long ravine away from the main body of the Rift Canyon." Still later, in The Scarlet Brotherhood by Sean K. Reynolds, the entry for Matreyus Lake said, "undead such as sons of Kyuss walk the nearby jungle – the evil demigod is said to have spent time here." Kyuss is also one of the epic-level villains detailed in Elder Evils, and is also featured on that book's cover.

In his divine form, Kyuss appears as a towering humanoid shaped entirely of green Kyuss worms, with two blazing eyes peering from beneath the hood of his ragged cloak. According to the Kyuss sidebar in Dragon #336's "Ecology of the Spawn of Kyuss", his original divine form was a gaunt man with empty eyesockets filled with writhing worms and hands of bare bone, but he has evolved into his appearance of a gargantuan Worms That Walk as his cult grew stronger.

Stoner rock band Kyuss, originally named as Sons of Kyuss, took their name from the character.

== L ==
=== Lendor ===
Lendor is the Suel god of Time, Tedium, Patience, and Study. His holy symbol is a crescent moon superimposed upon a full moon surrounded by stars. Though the exact number of stars varies, it is usually fourteen. Lendor is a distant deity, seeming to care little for the affairs of the world. He considers himself superior to other deities, especially his children. He has the ability to banish or undo the magic of any of his brood. Lendor was first detailed for the Dungeons & Dragons game in the World of Greyhawk Fantasy Game Setting (1983), by Gary Gygax.

=== Lirr ===
Lirr is the Oeridian goddess of Poetry and Art. She was first detailed for the Dungeons & Dragons game in the World of Greyhawk Fantasy Game Setting (1983), by Gary Gygax.

=== Llerg ===
Llerg is the god of Beasts and Strength. Among the savage Suel tribes of the fictional world's Amedio Jungle and Hepmonaland, he is known as Hlerg.

=== Lolth ===
The drow goddess Lolth is an iconic D&D villain originally associated with Greyhawk.

=== Lydia ===
Lydia is the Suel goddess of Music, Knowledge, and Daylight. Her holy symbol is a spray of colors from an open hand. She is depicted as a dynamic, white-haired woman with clear blue eyes. She wears a white gown trimmed in silver and gold. She is constantly surrounded by a sphere of force. Lydia interacts with many other deities, exchanging songs and information. She opposes Pholtus, feeling that others must see the light of truth without being blinded by it. Her philosophy pleases Trithereon, who similarly presses for the freedom of the individual.

Lydia was first detailed for the Dungeons & Dragons game in the World of Greyhawk Fantasy Game Setting (1983), by Gary Gygax. Lydia was further detailed by Lenard Lakofka in Dragon #92 (1984), in the article Gods of the Suel Pantheon V.

== M ==
=== Mayaheine ===
Mayaheine is the demigoddess of Protection, Justice, and Valor. Her symbol is a downward-pointing sword with a V on either side. Mayaheine is an unusually tall woman with auburn-gold hair with blue eyes. She carries a bastard sword and a longbow, and is garbed in silvery plate mail. Mayaheine is a servant and paladin of Pelor, and her faith serves as a more strongly martial complement to Pelor's church. Her relationship with Heironeous is more uncertain, but most of their respective clergy sees their roles as complementary, Mayaheine as protector and Heironeous as the one who marshals the hosts to battle.

=== Merikka ===
Merikka is the Oeridian demigoddess of Agriculture, Farming, and the Home. Her holy symbol is a basket of grain and a long scroll. Merikka is described as a quiet, gray-haired woman of faded beauty, carrying a basket of grain and holding a scroll, though her image in her temple in the village of Orlane is that of a beautiful young woman. Merikka is obsessed with dates and cycles. Merikka is a cousin of Velnius, Atroa, Sotillion, Wenta, and Telchur. She reports to Cyndor, who helps her coordinate the proper times to plant and harvest with the gods of the seasons. Merikka was imprisoned for some years in the Godtrap beneath Castle Greyhawk by the archmage Zagyg, but is now free. She resents chaotic gods and any who would disrupt her work.

=== Meyanok ===
Meyanok is the Touv god of serpents, poison, discord, darkness, and famine. His symbol is a snake coiled around a skull. Meyanok is always depicted as a serpent coiled around a skull. Meyanok was born when the pain of Breeka's childbirth mingled with the darkness. He is the progenitor of Vara, Damaran, and Berna, who hatched from eggs spawned from the mating of Meyanok's anger and lust. Meyanok, like the other Touv gods, is a greater spirit who dwells within the mortal world.

=== Mok'slyk ===
Mok'slyk is an old Flan name for an entity known as the Serpent, an entity of godlike power believed to be the personification of arcane magic. The Serpent is said to be a member of a group of unfathomably old entities known as the Ancient Brethren, which, though similar to gods, are not exactly gods, though some beings honor them as such. The Lady of Pain, Asmodeus, and Jazirian are also sometimes said to belong, or to have once belonged, to this group, and supposedly Vecna is a descendant of the Ancient Brethren. There may also be a connection between the Ancient Brethren and the draedens and baernoloths born before the multiverse began.

=== Mouqol ===
Mouqol is the Baklunish god of Trade, Negotiation, Ventures, Appraisal, and Reciprocity. His symbol is a set of scales and weights. Mouqol is a neutral deity; in the ancient war between Darkness and Light that resulted in the Baklunish Hegira, he refused to take a side, trading with both antitheses. Mouqol is a skilled bargainer, able to haggle skillfully even with the notoriously tricky and sly genie races. Mouqol's greatest talents, however, are his ability to discern the true desires of his clients and procure rare items from exotic and seemingly impossible sources. Mouqol takes the side of neither the gods of good nor the gods of evil. As he does with the rest of the Baklunish pantheon, Al'Akbar remains subordinate to Mouqol in the divine hierarchy.

=== Myhriss ===
Myhriss is the Flan goddess of Love, Romance, and Beauty. Her symbol is the lovebird. Myhriss was first detailed for the Dungeons & Dragons game in the World of Greyhawk Fantasy Game Setting (1983), by Gary Gygax. Myhriss is shown as a Flan woman just reaching adulthood, a garland of flowers in her hair. She has two aspects, a dark-haired, intimidating woman wielding a whip and a golden-haired, gentler woman wielding a shortbow.

== N ==
=== Nazarn ===
Nazarn (NAZZ-arn) is a half-orc hero-god of formal, ritualistic, and public combat. His symbol is a chain wrapped around a short sword. He appears as an older half-orc with a strongly orcish appearance. His hair is gray, on its way to becoming completely white. He carries his short sword, Crowdpleaser. Nazarn has no known relationships with the orcish pantheon. Nazarn was once a popular gladiator slave owned by a member of the Scarlet Brotherhood, but he escaped to find a better place for himself elsewhere in the world. Nazarn's apotheosis was sponsored by the Suloise deity Kord. During his travels, he impressed a half-giant descendant of the god Kord and eventually convinced Kord himself to elevate him to godhood after defeating all opponents (including a young green dragon) in a Hepmonaland arena run by yuan-ti.

=== Nerull ===
Nerull is the patron of those who seek the greatest evil for their own enjoyment or gain. His worshipers, who include evil necromancers and rogues, depict him as an almost skeletal cloaked figure who bears a scythe. He is known as the Reaper, the Foe of All Good, Hater of Life, Bringer of Darkness, King of All Gloom, and Reaper of Flesh.

=== Nola ===
Nola is the Touv goddess of the Sun. Her symbol is a gold or copper image of the sun. Nola is depicted as a Touv woman of serene beauty, her head surrounded by a corona of flame. Nola is the first being created by Uvot, who brought her to life by thanking the warm sun for blessing the land, that the land might create Uvot. Nola admired Vogan, the god of rain and storms, the aspect of one complementing the other, both enriching their father Uvot. Vogan and Nola became the parents of Breeka, goddess of beasts and plants. Uvot blessed Nola, and she gave birth to Xanag, goddess of metals and beauty, born from Uvot's earth and shining with the fire of her mother. Nola is named for a college friend of Sean K. Reynolds's.

=== Norebo ===
Norebo is the Suel god of Luck, Gambling, and Risks. His symbol is a pair of eight-sided dice.

== O ==
=== Obad-Hai ===
Obad-Hai is the god of Nature, Woodlands, Hunting, and Beasts, one of the most ancient known. He is often called the Shalm. He is also considered to be the god of summer by the Flan. Originally a Flan deity, Obad-Hai is most favored by Rangers, druids and other nature priests. His holy symbol is a mask of oak leaves and acorns. Obad-Hai was first detailed for the first edition of the Advanced Dungeons & Dragons game in the article "The Deities & Demigods of the World of Greyhawk", by E. Gary Gygax in Dragon #69 (January 1983) with game statistics on page 29 and a description on page 30, including a black-and-white illustration by Jeff Easley.

Environmental studies scholar Matthew Chrulew contrasted neutral Obad-Hai with the good-aligned Ehlonna as corresponding "to two opposed modern conceptions of "nature"": Ehlonna's support for interventions against threats to the woodlands aligns with "the values of environmentalism", while Obad-Hai's more isolationst ideal of living "in harmony with the natural world" is "a perspective more in line with deep ecology".

=== Old Faith ===
The Old Faith is the chief druidic order in the Flanaess. Though strongly associated with the faiths of Beory and Obad-Hai, the Old Faith also encompasses other deities, principally those concerned with natural phenomena. A quartet of gods representing the seasons is common, though the identities of these deities vary from culture to culture. The Old Faith is closely associated with the bards of the Old Lore, to whom they entrust many of their secrets. The druids of the Old Faith are more loosely allied with the Rangers of the Gnarley. Their alignments differ, but their goals are compatible.

=== Olidammara ===
Olidammara is the god of Music, Revels, Wine, Rogues, Humor, and Tricks. He is often called the Laughing Rogue. Olidammara is one of the more eccentric gods of Oerth. The Laughing Rogue is often involved in good-natured schemes involving the other gods (less good-natured for the more evil deities), with repercussions that can make life difficult for his faithful. He has few proper priests, but is held in high regard in almost all non-evil regions of the Flanaess. Olidammara was first detailed for the Dungeons & Dragons game in "The Deities and Demigods of the World of Greyhawk" by Gary Gygax in Dragon #70 (1983). Olidammara was subsequently detailed in the World of Greyhawk Fantasy Game Setting (1983), though a typo in the work identified him as a god of "rougery".

=== Osprem ===
Osprem is the Suel goddess of Sea Voyages, Ships, and Sailors. She is often depicted as a beautiful woman in a flowing gown, or as a dolphin, barracuda, or sperm whale. In human form, she wears a ring carved from a whale's tooth, a gift from the grandfather of all whales. She is the occasional companion of Xerbo. Osprem was first detailed for the Dungeons & Dragons game in the World of Greyhawk Fantasy Game Setting (1983), by Gary Gygax.

== P ==
=== Pelor ===
Pelor is a Flan deity worshipped throughout the Flanaess, and on other worlds as well. He rides a mighty ki-rin named Star Thought, summoning eagles and destroying evil with bolts of light. He is depicted as an older man with wild golden hair and beard, dressed in robes of shining white.

=== Phaulkon ===
Phaulkon is the Suel god of Air, Wind, Clouds, Birds, and Archery. His symbol is a winged human silhouette. Phaulkon was first detailed for the Dungeons & Dragons game in the modules The Secret of Bone Hill (1981). Phaulkon appears as a powerful winged man, clean-shaven and bare-chested. Among the gods of the Suel, Phaulkon is regarded as second only to Kord in fighting prowess. Though he resides on Arborea, he often visits the plane of Elemental Air. Phaulkon is the son of Lendor, and fathered Kord upon Syrul. He is a staunch ally of Jascar, Murlynd, Atroa, and Aerdrie Faenya. He is very active, and dedicated to the eradication of evil.

=== Pholtus ===
Pholtus was one of the first gods created by Gary Gygax as he and Dave Arneson developed the game of Dungeons & Dragons. Pholtus eventually evolved into Greyhawk's Oeridian god of Light, Resolution, Law, Order, Inflexibility, the Sun, and the Moons, and was also used in the Planescape campaign. His symbol is a silvery sun with a crescent moon on the lower right quadrant. His colors are white, silver and gold.

In the early 1970s, when Gary Gygax was using the dungeons beneath Castle Greyhawk to playtest the game that would become known as Dungeons & Dragons, he did not include any references to any organized religion. Eventually his players asked that their clerics be able to gain their powers from someone more specific than "the gods". Gygax, with tongue in cheek, created two gods; Pholtus, and Saint Cuthbert.

=== Phyton ===
Phyton is the Suel god of Nature, Beauty, and Farming. Phyton's symbol is a scimitar in front of an oak tree.

=== Procan ===
Procan is the Oeridian god of Seas, Sea Life, Salt, Sea Weather, and Navigation. His holy symbol is a gold and coral trident above or piercing a cresting wave.

=== Pyremius ===
Pyremius is the Suel god of Assassins, Fire, Poison, and Murder. His symbol is a demonic face with ears like a bat's wings. Pyremius is depicted as a hideous human with a bald, jermlaine-like head. He wears large bracers of brass. He wields a sword, the Red Light of Hades, and a whip called the Viper of Hades. Pyremius's closest allies are the goddess Syrul and the Oinoloth Mydianchlarus. He is distrustful of all other gods; he remembers how he betrayed Ranet, the previous Suel deity of fire, and doesn't wish for the same thing to happen to him. Geshtai particularly loathes him.

Pyremius was first detailed for the Dungeons & Dragons game in the World of Greyhawk Fantasy Game Setting (1983), by Gary Gygax. He was one of the deities described in the From the Ashes] set (1992). Pyremius's role in the 3rd edition Greyhawk setting was defined in the Living Greyhawk Gazetteer (2000).

== R ==
=== Ralishaz ===
Ralishaz is the god of Chance, Ill Luck, Misfortune, and Insanity. His holy symbol is composed of three sticks of bone.

=== Rao ===
Rao is the Flan god of Peace, Reason, and Serenity. His holy symbol is a heart-shaped mask with a calm expression, or a simple white heart crafted of metal or wood. His followers are called Raoans.

=== Raxivort ===
Raxivort is the patron god of the xvarts. He also acts as a patron of wererats, bats, and rats. His symbol is a fiery blue hand.

=== Roykyn ===
Roykyn (ROY-kihn) is the gnomish hero-goddess of cruelty, particularly cruel pranks. Her favored animal is a feral cat, and her symbol is a furled scroll dripping dark fluid. Roykyn is commonly depicted as a dark-haired gnomish woman with a wicked gleam in her eye, but she can appear in almost any humanoid form. Roykyn was formerly a priestess of the gnomish deity Urdlen, but her apotheosis was sponsored by Erythnul, who perhaps in selecting this particular servant was seeking to broaden his appeal beyond simple violence.

=== Rudd ===
Rudd is the Oeridian goddess of Chance, Good Luck, and Skill. As the Great Gambler, she knows every card game invented. Rudd's holy symbol is a bull's eye target.

== S ==
=== Saint Cuthbert ===
Saint Cuthbert of the Cudgel is the combative deity of Wisdom, Dedication, and Zeal.

=== Sotillion ===
Sotillion is the Oeridian goddess of Summer, the South Wind, Ease, and Comfort. Her holy symbol is a winged tiger of pure orange. Sotillion was first detailed for the Dungeons & Dragons game in the World of Greyhawk Fantasy Game Setting (1983), by Gary Gygax. Sotillion appears as a beautiful human woman of about twenty-five dressed in diaphanous clothes, accompanied by a winged tiger of pure orange. Sotillion is the wife of Zilchus, whose prosperity allows her to retain her favorite comforts. Her realm on Ysgard's first layer is called the Green Fields. She is also sometimes found in Grandfather Oak in Arvandor. Sotillion promotes all the joys of comfort: warm weather, good food and drink, pleasant company, good conversation, and relaxing quiet. Stress and hard work should be avoided when possible. One's comforts should be protected and defended with zeal, as a life without comfort is worth little.

=== Stern Alia ===
Stern Alia is the demigoddess of Oeridian Culture, Law, and Motherhood. She is also the tutelary goddess of the island nation of Thalos in Western Oerik, which was settled by Aerdi explorers many centuries ago. Her holy symbol is an Oeridian woman's face. Alia is the mother of Heironeous and Hextor, although they have different fathers. Another son, Stratis, is mentioned in literature for the Chainmail miniatures game in Dragon #285, but he is deceased. The clerics of Stern Alia organize local militias to fight back against threats, buying time for the professional armies.

=== Stratis ===
Stratis was an Oeridian god of War once worshipped in Western Oerik. He is now dead. He is morally neutral in alignment, neither good like Heironeous nor evil like Hextor. It may seem likely that he was lawful in alignment like his mother and brothers, but the fact that he grew to adulthood on the plane of Ysgard makes a chaotic neutral alignment a possibility. Stratis was an armed and armored warrior, looking like a strong, handsome human man with four arms. Stratis is a son of Stern Alia, and therefore a brother or half-brother of Heironeous and Hextor. Stratis was god of war in all of its forms, both just and unjust.

=== Syrul ===
Syrul is the Suel goddess of Lies, Deceit, Treachery, and False Promises. Her holy symbol is a forked tongue.

== T ==
=== Telchur ===
In the World of Greyhawk campaign setting for the Dungeons & Dragons role-playing game, Telchur is the Oeridian god of Winter, Cold, and the North Wind. His symbol is a leafless tree in a field of snow. Telchur was first detailed for the Dungeons & Dragons game in the World of Greyhawk Fantasy Game Setting (1983), by Gary Gygax. Telchur is depicted as a dark-eyed, gaunt man with and a long beard of icicles. Bitter and brooding, the God of Winter strikes at his enemies from the back of a winged albino bull with his icy shortspear. He is also represented with Vexxin, an axe made of ice, as tall as he is; with a great club of bronzewood called Tla, or with a broadsword called Issai.

=== Tharizdun ===
Tharizdun (/θəˈrɪzdən/) is the god of Eternal Darkness, Decay, Entropy, Malign Knowledge, Insanity, and Cold. He originated in the World of Greyhawk campaign setting but has since also appeared in other settings. Created by Gary Gygax based on Robert J. Kuntz's dark god "Tharzduun", Tharizdun first appeared in the module Forgotten Temple of Tharizdun. He would later appear in Gygax's series of Gord novels.

Tharizdun was described in Dragon #294 as a pitch-black, roiling, amorphous form. As the Dark God, he is described as an incorporeal wraithform, black and faceless. Gary Gygax described Tharizdun as a "primordial deity, that of matter at rest and decay of energy, viz. entropy." Tharizdun has been depicted on the cover of Gygax's Gord the Rogue novel Come Endless Darkness as a huge, bald, humanoid man, with claws, greenish-black skin, and pointed ears. Gygax said that in the Gord novels, "the worst and most terrible of Tharizdun's forms could come into full power and attack". Tharizdun's "free" holy symbol is a "black sun with variegated rays". His second holy symbol of an inverted ziggurat indicates that the work of those who bound him would be overturned, according to Gygax. His holy number is 333.

Tharizdun is sometimes worshiped as an entity called the Elder Elemental Eye (a being similar to Ghaunadaur), but few of these worshipers recognize the two as being the same entity. Gygax himself indicated that the two creatures were separate beings. The Elder Elemental God is described as a huge, mottled, tentacled being, or as a pillar of vast elemental force with a body of burning magma, radiating steam.

Some say that Tharizdun originated in the Far Realm or in a previous universe. Tharizdun was imprisoned eons ago by the forebears of those beings known as the Great Powers, although it is said that Pelor was also involved. It's said that both good and evil deities worked together to ensure his imprisonment. As the Dark God, he is credited with the corruption of the Seelie Court. Through the Scorpion Crown, he is said to have destroyed the ancient kingdom of Sulm. Tharizdun was imprisoned long ago, but his prison may weaken at times, allowing his influence to creep out into the worlds beyond. Tharizdun's temple in the Yatils is thought to have been originally defeated with the aid of the legendary Six from Shadow.

Tharizdun has many known artifacts. "One" that is known is actually many: a collection of gems known as the 333 Gems of Tharizdun. Their current location is unknown, but it is certain that the collection was split up long ago. Other artifacts associated with Tharizdun include the horn known as the Wailer of Tharizdun, the thermophagic sword Druniazth, and the Spear of Sorrow. The Scorpion Crown was gifted by him to the last king of Sulm. Still another artifact, the Weeping Hexagram, is in the hands of the Scarlet Brotherhood. In Gary Gygax's Gord the Rogue Series, there were a set of three artifacts known as the Theorparts, which, combined, could free Tharizdun. Each Theorpart represented one of the shades of evil (i.e., neutral, lawful, or chaotic.)

The Demiplane of Imprisonment is hidden somewhere in the depths of the Ethereal Plane, resembling a swollen, crystalline cyst nearly a mile in diameter. The ethereal substance surrounding the demiplane boils with the dreamscapes of Tharizdun's worshipers and others whose dreams the dark god invades. Within the prison, Tharizdun dreams of a multiverse where his goals succeeded, where he destroyed all of Creation and rebuilt it in his own foul image. The binding magic is less concerned with preventing his escape - which he could accomplish with ease should he discover the truth - but to prevent any outside source from informing him otherwise.

In the Dungeons & Dragons Novel Series "Abyssal Plague", Tharizdun's prison is revealed to be a universe that has long since been destroyed by that realm's own version of the Abyss known as the Voidharrow. Mildly intelligent and with the ability to corrupt and warp living creatures, the Voidharrow spent eternity alone in this realm of utter destruction until Tharizdun was imprisoned there by the other gods for his creation of the abyss. The reason behind this realm as the prison in which he would be trapped was to leave him in a realm just like the one he would have turned the multiverse into if he had been able to; with all of his power intact, he would have nothing to destroy and an infinite amount of time to lay out an infinite number of plans to free himself, only for him to have no way of implementing any of them.

==== Reception ====
Tharizdun was #4 on CBR's 2020 "Dungeons & Dragons: 10 Endgame Bosses You Need To Use In Your Next Campaign" list — the article states that "What's interesting is that all of Tharizdun's followers and subjects are insane. DMs can easily make a horror insane asylum-type of adventure where deep within the institution's underbelly is a cult threatening the world by summoning and freeing Tharizdun. That ought to be full of mystery and they don't even have to kill Tharizdun, just send him back to prison".

Riley Trepanier, for GameRant, highlighted Tharizdun as a deity for players to oppose in 5th Edition. She wrote, "This elder interloper god, sometimes known as The Elder Elemental Eye, features in the Princes of the Apocalypse module as a mostly-forgotten god locked away in a prison from the Greyhawk setting, as opposed to the Forgotten Realms. [...] With such a powerful combination of powers, Tharizdun is another deity that could easily turn out to be a major reckoning for the most overconfident of parties".

In 2019, Matthew Mercer incorporated a cult dedicated to freeing Tharizdun as a major antagonist in the second campaign of Critical Role, a Dungeons & Dragons web series.

=== Trithereon ===
In the World of Greyhawk campaign setting for the Dungeons & Dragons role-playing game, Trithereon is the chaotic good god of Individuality, Liberty, Retribution, and Self-Defense. Trithereon was first detailed for the Dungeons & Dragons game in "The Deities and Demigods of the World of Greyhawk" by Gary Gygax in Dragon #68 (1982). Trithereon is a foe of evil and oppression. His love of freedom sometimes causes him to come into conflict with other good deities, such as Pholtus and Heironeous. Bralm hates Trithereon for his promotion of individualism. He is a strong ally of the quasi-deity Krovis, and he is allied with Kurell and Pelor as well. Trithereon is pleased with Lydia's philosophy of individual empowerment through learning. Trithereon is depicted as a young man with red-gold hair, tall and well-built, wearing a chainmail shirt with clothes of blue or violet. He is armed with three magic weapons: a sword named Freedom's Tongue; a spear called Krelestro, the Harbinger of Doom; and a scepter known as the Baton of Retribution. He often appears with three summoned animals which serve him without question: Nemoud the Hound, Harrus the Falcon, and Carolk the Sea Lizard.

=== Tsolorandril ===
Tsolorandril is the hero-deity of Wave Motions. It sees itself as a keeper of records, noting the natural cycles of things like politics, nature, and time, and predicts how these patterns will take shape in the future. Its symbol is a sphere with a simple wave-shape repeating around its circumference. Tsolorandril is a tall, androgynous humanoid with very white skin, muted facial features, and silver-blue hair, carrying a length of metallic rope that moves as if it were liquid. Tsolorandril is an ally of Elayne Mystica. It is thought to have been sponsored to its present status by Cyndor.

== U ==
=== Ulaa ===
Ulaa is the goddess of Hills, Mountains, and Gemstones. Her holy symbol is a mountain with a ruby heart; she places rubies in the earth as gifts to miners, who do her husband's work.

== V ==
=== Vara ===
Vara is the Touv goddess of Nightmares and Fear. Her symbol is a necklace of mummified animal feet. Vara prefers to be depicted as a Touv woman with red eyes and stars in her hair. Vara is the first child of Meyanok, and considers herself to be superior to her younger brother Damaran and younger sister Berna. She uses her status as the eldest to compel them to do her bidding. Like her father, Vara loathes the other Touv gods, and revels in the act of twisting their minds. Like the other Touv gods, Vara dwells on the Material Plane.

=== Vathris ===
Vathris is a hero-deity of anguish, lost causes, and revenge worshiped by some few in the Bright Desert. His symbol is a black spear. Originally, Vathris appeared as a shirtless Flan man with coppery skin, approximately nine feet tall, wearing beads of metal and clay in his long black hair. Today he is much diminished from his previous form, with a grisly torso wound that still oozes black bile, wielding the onyx longspear that killed him. His eyes are empty sockets. Where he once stood for the future, now he only obsesses about the past. He can manifest only once or twice a year, and then he dies again, to reemerge a year later. Needless to say, he has no permanent realm.

=== Vatun ===
Vatun is the god of Northern Barbarians, Cold, Winter, and Arctic Beasts. His symbol is the sun setting on a snowy landscape. Though rather popular among the Suel barbarians of the Thillonrian Peninsula, Vatun was not worshipped by the Suloise Imperium and is not generally considered part of the Suel pantheon. Vatun appears as a massive Suel barbarian dressed in the skins of polar bears. His beard is made of snow and ice, and his breath is a frozen fog. He wields a mighty battleaxe called Winter's Bite, made completely of ice. Vatun's only allies are his brother, Dalt, and the Suel god Llerg. His enemies include Telchur, Iuz, and the archdevil Belial.

=== Velnius ===
Velnius is the Oeridian god of the Sky and Weather. His holy symbol is a bird perching upon a cloud.

=== Vogan ===
Vogan is the Touv god of Rain, Storms, and Water. His symbol is a rain cloud. Vogan appears as a Touv man with hair of cascading water and laughing eyes. He is said to be temperamental, and to have a wandering nature and roving eye. Through the sun goddess Nola, Vogan is the father of Breeka, and thus the grandfather of Katay. He is also the father of Kundo, through Nola's daughter by Uvot, Xanag.

== W ==
=== Wastri ===
Wastri is the Suloise god of Amphibians, Bigotry, and Self-Deception. His symbol is a gray toad. Wastri was first detailed for the Dungeons & Dragons game in "The Deities and Demigods of the World of Greyhawk" by Gary Gygax in Dragon #71 (1983). Wastri appears as a human with froglike features, dressed in clothes of gray and yellow and wielding a glave-guisarme called Skewer of the Impure. Wastri teaches his worshippers that humans are superior to all other races. Some humanoid races such as goblins, orcs, and bullywugs are fit to serve humanity as slaves; other races, like dwarves, elves, gnomes, and halflings, must be exterminated.

=== Wee Jas ===
Wee Jas is the Suel goddess of Magic, Death, Vanity, and Law. Her symbol is a skull in front of a fireball, or just a red skull. Wee Jas was first detailed for the Dungeons & Dragons game in the World of Greyhawk Fantasy Game Setting (1983), by Gary Gygax. Wee Jas always appears as a highly attractive human female; other than that, details of her appearance vary wildly. Wee Jas thinks of herself as a steward of the dead. Though she is a relatively benign death goddess, she has no problem with undead being created – as long as they are not reanimated against their will, and their remains are procured in a lawful manner.

=== Wenta ===
Wenta is the Oeridian goddess of Autumn, Brewing, Harvest, and the West Wind. Her symbol is a large mug of beer. Wenta was first detailed for the Dungeons & Dragons game in the World of Greyhawk Fantasy Game Setting (1983), by Gary Gygax. Wenta always appears as a young, rosy-cheeked, buxom woman with straw in her hair and holding a large mug of beer. Wenta sends the cool winds of autumn as a signal that it is time to reap the harvest. She advocates staving off winter's chill with beer and ale, and instructs brewers to care for their product as they would a lover. Wenta rewards each day of hard work with pleasantly cool nights, boon companions, and plenty of good spirits to loosen the tongue and quicken the heart.

== X ==
=== Xan Yae ===
Xan Yae is the goddess of Twilight, Shadows, Stealth, and Mental Power worshiped by some of the Baklunish people who inhabit the fictional lands of Flanaess and Oerik. Her symbol is a black lotus blossom. She appears as a Baklunish human of any age and gender, with a slender and graceful build, and wielding a pair of magical falchions that she can shrink to easily conceal. Xan Yae was first detailed for the Dungeons & Dragons game in the World of Greyhawk Fantasy Game Setting (1983), by Gary Gygax. She is usually dressed in cloth of dove gray, dusty rose, or golden orange. Xan Yae is revered in Ket, the Plains of the Paynims, Tusmit, and Zeif.

=== Xanag ===
Xanag is the Touv goddess of Metals and Beauty. She represents the bounty of the earth transformed by fire (that is to say, metals) and the beauty of things made from it. Her holy symbol is a circle with seven lines radiating from it. Xanag is depicted as a Touv woman seemingly made of gold, surrounded by a radiant light. She is indifferent to questions of morality and easily distracted by the superficial. Xanag is the daughter of Nola and Uvot, combining her father Uvot's affinity with the land's bounty with the radiant light of her mother the sun. Xanag mated with stormy Vogan and birthed Kundo, god of noise, music, and the hardiness of building.

=== Xerbo ===
Xerbo is the Suel god of the Sea, Sailing, Money, and Business. His holy symbol is the dragon turtle. Xerbo was first detailed for the Dungeons & Dragons game in the World of Greyhawk Fantasy Game Setting (1983), by Gary Gygax. Xerbo is depicted as a large man with matted, kelp-like hair, wearing armor made from a dragon turtle's scales. He wields a trident called Murky Deep. Xerbo is married to the sea-goddess Osprem, and is depicted as being a rival to both Procan and Zilchus. Xerbo is worshipped by Suel peoples across the Flanaess, especially the Lordship of the Isles, the Sea Princes, and Sunndi.

== Y ==
=== Ye'Cind ===
In the core Greyhawk setting of the Dungeons & Dragons game, Ye'Cind is the elven deity of musical magick and music in general. Harkening back to Tolkien's Ilúvatar, Ye'Cind is depicted as teaching that music is an inherent part of the patterns of the multiverse, and that magick and music together can create something superior to either one alone. Ye'Cind is shown as an attractive androgynous elf wearing blue and green clothing; like thons patron Corellon, Ye'Cind is male and female, both and neither. Ye'Cind's holy symbol is a recorder. Ye'Cind spends most of thons time in the realm of Brightwater in Arborea. Clerics of Ye'Cind are scholars of music, who know how to play many different musical instruments. Many clerics of Ye'Cind are also talented composers who can weave subtle magicks into their songs and music. Designer Gary Gygax derived the name Ye'Cind from the name of one of his daughters, Cindy. (The name Cindy is itself a diminutive of an epithet of the Greek moon goddess Selene.)

== Z ==
=== Zagyg ===
Zagyg (formerly known as "Zagig Yragerne") is the god of Humor, Eccentricity, Occult Lore, and Unpredictability. His symbol is the rune of insanity. When Gary Gygax first created the dungeons underneath Castle Greyhawk in 1972, the complex labyrinth encompassed 13 levels filled with devious traps, secret passageways, hungry monsters and glittering treasure. For anyone who made it to the bottom level alive, the insane architect of the dungeons, Zagyg, awaited them. ("Zagyg" is a reverse homophone of "Gygax", and was Gygax's inside joke that the person who designed this crazy, purposeless place—himself—must be insane. In later material, Gygax expanded Zagyg's name to "Zagig Yragerne", a reverse homophone of his full name, Ernest Gary Gygax.) Only three players ever made it to the bottom level and met Zagyg, all of them during solo adventures: Rob Kuntz (playing Robilar), Gygax's son Ernie (playing Tenser), and Rob's brother Terry (playing Terik). Their reward was that Zagyg instantly transported them to the far side of the world on a giant slide, where they each faced a long solo trek back to the city of Greyhawk.

=== Zilchus ===
Zilchus (ZIL-chus) is the Oeridian god of Power, Prestige, Money, Business, and Influence. His holy symbol is a pair of hands clutching a bag of gold. Zilchus was first detailed for the Dungeons & Dragons game in the World of Greyhawk Fantasy Game Setting (1983), by Gary Gygax. Zilchus was one of the deities described in the From the Ashes set (1992), for the Greyhawk campaign. His role in the cosmology of the Planescape campaign setting was described in On Hallowed Ground (1996). Zilchus's role in the 3rd edition Greyhawk setting was defined in the Living Greyhawk Gazetteer (2000).

=== Zodal ===
Zodal is the Flan god of mercy, hope, and benevolence. His holy symbol is a man's hand partially wrapped in gray cloth. Zodal is depicted as man dressed in simple gray robes with large, careworn hands. He encourages compassion in situations where vengeance and anger might be easier, and defuses the negative emotions of all around him. Zodal is a servant of Rao and Joramy's estranged lover. He is allied with Heironeous and Pelor. He considers even the most hateful gods to be his friends, believing that with his encouragement they might change their ways.

=== Zuoken ===
Zuoken (/zuː ˈoʊ kɛn/ zoo-OH-ken) is the Baklunish god of Physical and Mental Mastery. His symbol is a striking fist. Zuoken was first detailed for the Dungeons & Dragons game in the World of Greyhawk Fantasy Game Setting (1983), by Gary Gygax. Zuoken was one of the deities described in the From the Ashes set (1992), for the Greyhawk campaign.
