= The Assassin's Knot =

Dungeons & Dragons adventure module

- The cover of The Assassin's Knot, with uncredited art, signed by MD Law. The artwork depicts six characters in a tavern.
- Code: L2
- TSR product code: 9057
- Rules required: Advanced Dungeons & Dragons 1st edition
- Character levels: 2 - 5
- Campaign setting: Generic or Greyhawk
- Authors: Lenard "Len" Lakofka
- First published: 1983

Linked modules
- L1 L2 L3

The Assassin's Knot is an adventure module written by Lenard Lakofka for the first edition of Advanced Dungeons & Dragons and published by TSR in 1983. It is designed for 6 to 10 novice and intermediate players with characters of levels 2–5.

The Assassin's Knot is a sequel to The Secret of Bone Hill, and is the second of three modules in the Lendore Isle series. It was ranked the 29th greatest Dungeons & Dragons adventure of all time by Dungeon magazine.

== Plot summary ==
The Assassin's Knot is a sequel to The Secret of Bone Hill, picking up on themes from that module and shifts them to a new locale. The player characters must solve the mystery of who committed the murder of the Baron of Restenford, with evidence pointing towards someone from the town of Garrotten. The scenario details both the town and its castle.

The Assassin's Knot module is different from most of its contemporaries in that it contained no dungeon or dungeon-like area. The longer the players take to find the murderer, the more unfortunate events occur in the village.

The village, Garrotten, is reputed to be the place to go to have someone killed. The entire village shuts down when the Baron of Restenford is found dead, mutilated beyond the possibility of magical restoration. Three small clues are all the player characters have to unravel the mystery.

== Publication history ==
The Assassin's Knot was written by Len Lakofka and published by TSR in 1983 as a 32-page booklet with two outer folders. It is a sequel to L1 The Secret of Bone Hill, and the second module in the Lendore Isle series. This series was originally planned to be five modules. The third module in the series, L3 Deep Dwarven Delve, was only available as a limited release as part of the Dungeons & Dragons Silver Anniversary Collector's Edition set released in 1999. In 2006, Lakofka announced on the Pen & Paper website that he would be releasing L4 and L5 through Dragonsfoot, introducing additional material and adventures set in the Lendore Isles. A subsequent threaded discussion on the Dragonsfoot forum gives the title of L4 as "Devilspawn".

The adventure "Priestly Secrets" in Dungeon #71 (Nov/Dec 1998) was set in Restenford and took into account events from this module in Garrotten.

== Reception ==
The Assassin's Knot was ranked the 29th greatest Dungeons & Dragons adventure of all time by Dungeon magazine in 2004. In his description of The Assassin's Knot in Heroic Worlds, Lawrence Schick makes light of the module by noting the obviousness of the murderers being from a town named Garrotten: "A murderer from a town called 'Garrotten'? Nah..."

Doug Cowie reviewed the scenario for Imagine magazine. He noted the high standard of production and the "well laid out, clear instructions" for the gamemaster as well as good maps and plans. However, Cowie was dissatisfied with the proof reading and found a number of typos, some of which could interrupt the flow of play, according to him. He praised the fact that most of the interaction is all human/humanoid with "hardly a monster to be seen". Cowie also liked the off-stage action that puts some time pressure on the players. He appreciated the excellent detail for the town of Garrotten and praised Len Lakofka for having successfully dealt with the special issues involved in a murder mystery adventure. Cowie ended his review by noting: "This is a good 'un. I like it."

The Assassin's Knot received a fairly positive review by Dave Morris in issue No. 55 of White Dwarf magazine, who scored it 7 out of 10. Morris felt that the module was not in the same class as Temple of Death, lacking the sort of evocative background found in that adventure. He felt that it was "an entertaining murder mystery for AD&D characters", but added, "this module gives no feeling of being part of a real world with a real history... it is difficult to believe or be interested in the world of L2". He did feel that younger players may enjoy the module for its puzzle aspect.

Rick Swan reviewed the adventure in The Space Gamer No. 71. Swan felt that the characters on the cover of the module looked bored, and that players seeking to undertake this adventure had "better be ready to join them". Swan noted that the town in which the bulk of the adventure takes place and its occupants are well detailed, but that the non-player characters encountered were not interesting, and that the murder mystery of the plot is "a very pedestrian affair". Swan called the adventure "just plain dull" and advised passing on it.
