= Expedition to the Ruins of Greyhawk =

Dungeons & Dragons adventure book

- Rules required: 3.5 Ed. D&D
- Character levels: 8 - 13
- Campaign setting: Greyhawk
- Authors: Jason Bulmahn, James Jacobs, Erik Mona
- First published: August 14, 2007

Linked modules
- WGR1; Expedition to the Ruins of Greyhawk

Expedition to the Ruins of Greyhawk is an adventure book for the 3.5 edition of the Dungeons & Dragons fantasy role-playing game. The adventure is set in the game's World of Greyhawk campaign setting, specifically in and around Castle Greyhawk and its dungeons. As such, it is an update to the 1990 adventure module WGR1 - Greyhawk Ruins. The adventure also provides updates on a number of important Greyhawk personages as well as encounters in the Free City of Greyhawk itself.

== Overview ==
The Expedition to the Ruins of Greyhawk adventure puts the adventuring party on a quest into the depths of the Ruins of Castle Greyhawk to save the Free City from the forces of the foul demigod Iuz the Evil - the half-fiend son of the demon lord Graz'zt and the evil archmage Iggwilv. Iuz built a sinister empire that once held the northern lands of the Flanaess in fear and constantly threatened the surrounding kingdoms in an attempt to rule the entire world of Oerth.

Iuz's empire fell apart 200 years earlier after Iuz was captured by the Free City's founding wizard, the mad Zagig Yragerne, who imprisoned Iuz in a device called the "godtrap" as part of a bizarre experiment to achieve divinity for himself. Decades after Zagig (now the Archmage Demigod called Zagyg) achieved his godhood, a powerful mage from the Free City named Mordenkainen led an expedition into the depths of Castle Greyhawk.

There, two of Mordenkainen's allies, the warrior Lord Robilar, and Boccobite cleric Riggby, found the imprisoned Iuz and through Mordenkainen's manipulation, released the half-demon believing they could just kill him outright once and for all. Iuz, however, managed to escape the battle and fled back to his kingdom where he could recover his power and plot his revenge against his enemies. Afterward, Robilar, along with the archmage Rary, betrayed Mordenkainen and the Circle of Eight (a committee of wizards), by killing the great wizards Tenser and Otiluke, and leaving Bigby clinging to life. Mordenkainen had expected Rary to betray him sooner or later, but not Robilar, who was his trusted ally for decades.

Forty years later, in the Greyhawk realm's Common Year of 597, the player characters take on the role of adventurers who arrive at the Free City to explore the Ruins of Greyhawk looking for riches and glory. Under an oath with Zagig, Mordenkainen vowed never to enter the depths of Castle Greyhawk, but through researching Zagig's tomes, Mordenkainen only recently found a possible clue to Robilar's betrayal hidden deep inside the ruins. Mordenkainen, barred by oath from entering the dungeons, recruits the band of adventurers to go into the chambers for him and find the secret behind Robilar's treachery. Little do they realize they have stumbled upon an epic situation where failure could mean the destruction of the world.

This late Greyhawk adventure was set late enough in the timeline to accommodate events from Living Greyhawk.

== Contents ==
Unlike most published adventure modules, the Expedition to the Ruins of Greyhawk is technically an incomplete "open ended" adventure. Rather than detailing every single room of the dungeons below the ruins, only key areas that affect the main plot of the adventure are detailed. In fact, entire dungeon levels are left unmapped and the DM is encouraged to improvise their own encounters to fill in areas not covered by the game with their own content. The game provides a list of random encounters for each dungeon level, generic dungeon maps left clear of content, and numerous side quests to help the DM along the way and keep the adventure flowing.

- Introduction - The Introduction reviews the background history leading up to this adventure and introduces the major NPCs such as the Mad Wizard Zagig, Iuz the Evil, and the Archmage Mordenkainen.
- Chapter 1: Welcome to Greyhawk - This chapter contains the initial set up encounter that hooks the player characters into the adventure. The rest is a guide to the Free City of Greyhawk and contains numerous side quests the PCs can conduct while not directly exploring the dungeons below the ruins. There is a detailed overview map of the city here as well which is based on the original map published by TSR in 1989.
- Chapter 2: Castle and Dungeon - This chapter contains more background history for the ruins and has a detailed overview map to all the dungeons below the ruins and the structures on the surface level. The adventure leaves many levels of the dungeon unmapped, creating gaps in the main storyline that the Dungeon Master can fill in with their own material. Provided in this chapter are a list of random encounters for each level, and four generic dungeon maps that the DM can place anywhere in the dungeon to fill in these gaps in the action.
- Chapter 3: The Tower of War - This chapter details one of the three towers that make up the Ruins of Greyhawk and is the initial entry point to the dungeon as the characters will find access to the other towers barred until they uncover how to get into them.
- Chapter 4: The City of Thieves - This chapter brings the party back to the city after their first major delve into the dungeons. Here they can wrap up any side quests they started in Chapter 1, as well as get involved in more predicaments as the plot of the story thickens.
- Chapter 5: Wrath of Iuz - This chapter begins with the PCs the target of Iuz's forces who now know of the party's activities to stop their master's plans. The party must return to the dungeons via the Tower of Magic – another tower of the ruins which was previously barred to them and uncover the secrets below.
- Chapter 6: In Zagig's Shadow - This chapter contains the climactic showdown between the party of heroes and the forces of darkness that linger in the depths of the ruins including a surprise plot twist where the PCs end up facing a new enemy that could be worse than Iuz.
- Appendix: Monsters and Mythology – The appendix introduces two new monsters for D&D 3.5 edition – the aurumvorax (a badger-like magical beast whose pelt can be melted into pure gold. This beast originally appeared in the first edition module Expedition to the Barrier Peaks), and the Cataboligne Demon (an Abyssal creature that can appear as a beautiful maiden and lure victims closer with its captivating voice). This section also provides information on the demigods Iuz, Zagyg, and Zuoken, and a few new magic items such as the blade of chaos, and the bonewand.

== Publication history ==
The 224-page adventure was published by Wizards of the Coast (WotC) in August 2007 for the 3.5 edition Dungeons & Dragons rules. The work was authored by Jason Bulmahn, James Jacobs, and Erik Mona and is the first significant WotC release of new Greyhawk material since 2002. Cover art was by Michael Komarck, with interior art by Miguel Coimbra, Thomas Denmark, Brian Hagan, Jon Hodgson, Fred Hooper, Warren Mahy, Franz Vohwinkel, Ben Wooten, and James Zhang.

Shannon Appelcline notes that Greyhawk Ruins (1990) was remade into Expedition to the Ruins of Greyhawk for 3E by Paizo staffers, and published by Wizards of the Coast.

== Reception ==
Tim Janson of mania.com comments: "Literally this is an adventure which, depending on how often you play, should take players many weeks if not months to complete. It’s big…it’s deep…and it's waiting…I really like this book although I’m partial to the whole Greyhawk mystique. I think the writers have tried to be faithful to Gygax’s creation while adding their own unique handprints." (ellipses in original)

Expedition to the Ruins of Greyhawk received the silver ENnie Award for Best Adventure.

Shannon Appelcline called this book "a long-awaited return to the most famous dungeon in roleplaying", noting that it was published as part of a series of nostalgic adventures which suggested that Wizards of the Coast would soon end their 3.5e book publication.

TheGamer in 2022 ranked it as #8 on their list of "The Best 3.5 Edition Adventures".

== Reviews ==
- Reviews
