= Deep Dwarven Delve =

Dungeons & Dragons adventure module

- The cover of Deep Dwarven Delve, with art by Wayne Reynolds. The artwork depicts three adventurers confronting a giant snake with the head of a fanged man.
- Code: L3
- TSR product code: 9844
- Rules required: Advanced Dungeons & Dragons 1st edition
- Character levels: 3 - 6
- Campaign setting: Generic or Greyhawk
- Authors: Lenard (Len) Lakofka
- First published: 1999

Linked modules
- L1 L2 L3

L3 Deep Dwarven Delve is a fantasy adventure module or "module" for Advanced Dungeons & Dragons (1st edition).

== Plot summary ==
Deep Dwarven Delve is a straightforward dungeon crawl that leads the players through an abandoned dwarven mine, centering on freeing dwarves in another world from thralldom.

== Publication history ==
Deep Dwarven Delve is a sequel to L1 The Secret of Bone Hill and L2 The Assassin's Knot, and was written as the intended final adventure in the "L" series. Len Lakofka completed the manuscript in 1979 for the 1st Edition AD&D rules, although it was not published and lay forgotten in the TSR design vault for twenty years. The manuscript was eventually recovered, and as part of the Dungeons & Dragons game's Silver Anniversary celebration, L3 was finally published as one of the modules available as a limited release as part of the Dungeons & Dragons Silver Anniversary Collector's Edition set released in 1999. However, in discussions at www.dragonsfoot.org, Lakofka has stated that the rewrite he had done with one of Wizards of the Coast's editors had gotten lost, and the published version was "about 80% of what the first draft of the module was."

Lakofka published a sequel in 2009, Devilspawn, which was released through Dragonsfoot.
