= Greyhawk Ruins =

Dungeons & Dragons adventure module

- Code: WGR1
- TSR product code: 9292
- Rules required: 2nd Ed AD&D
- Character levels: 2 - 15
- Campaign setting: Greyhawk
- Authors: Blake Mobley; Timothy B. Brown
- First published: 1990
- ISBN: 0-88038-860-9

Linked modules
- WGR1; Expedition to the Ruins of Greyhawk

Greyhawk Ruins is an adventure module for the Dungeons & Dragons (D&D) fantasy role-playing game. It was published in 1990 by TSR, Inc. for the second edition Advanced Dungeons & Dragons rules.

== Publication history ==
WGR1 Greyhawk Ruins was written by Blake Mobley and Timothy B. Brown, with cover art by Fred Fields, and was published by TSR in 1990 as a 128-page book with an outer folder. The adventure portion was 86 pages with the remainder comprising monster lists and dungeon maps.

In 2007, Wizards of the Coast released Expedition to the Ruins of Greyhawk, an adventure book for 3.5 edition D&D that updates the material in Greyhawk Ruins.

== Contents ==
The adventure is set in the World of Greyhawk campaign setting and describes the ruins of and dungeons beneath Castle Greyhawk. The module is a more serious take on the dungeons of Castle Greyhawk than the 1988 module WG7 - Castle Greyhawk. The module features interior art by Thomas Baxa, Mark Nelson and David Simons. The adventure is designed for five to seven characters of levels 2 to 15.

Greyhawk Ruins takes place in a deep dungeon set in the ruins of Castle Greyhawk. The dungeon had 26 levels.

== Reception ==
Lisa Stevens reviewed the module in the December/January 1991 issue of White Wolf. She rated it a 1 out of a possible 5, the lowest rating, stating "this is one of the worst adventure supplements I have ever seen and it even falls short as a dungeon crawl. I was extremely disappointed after the recent upward trend of TSR's products. Avoid this one at all cost". In his 1991 book Heroic Worlds, Lawrence Schick calls the adventure "a classic illogical "gilded hole" dungeon".
