= The Secret of Bone Hill =

Dungeons & Dragons adventure module

- The cover of The Secret of Bone Hill, with art by Bill Willingham. The artwork depicts a female spellcaster casting lightning at an enemy.
- Code: L1
- TSR product code: 9045
- Rules required: Advanced Dungeons & Dragons 1st edition
- Character levels: 2–4
- Campaign setting: Greyhawk
- Authors: Lenard (Len) Lakofka
- First published: 1981

Linked modules
- L1 L2 L3

The Secret of Bone Hill is an adventure module written by Lenard Lakofka for the first edition of Advanced Dungeons & Dragons and published by TSR in 1981. It is designed for novice and intermediate players with characters of levels 2–4. The module received mixed reviews from critics.

== Plot summary ==
The module is described as a low-level adventure scenario that involves evil creatures roaming the unexplored areas of Bone Hill. The campaign setting and scenario featured in the book detail a complete town in the Lendore Isles, along with nearby monster lairs. The player characters adventure in and around the fishing port of Restenford. The module is more of a mini-setting than an adventure, offering several adventure locations, and may require a Dungeon Master to expand it using the World of Greyhawk milieu. The module expands upon the basic types of undead creatures found.

== Publication history ==
The Secret of Bone Hill was written by Len Lakofka and published by TSR in 1981 as a 32-page booklet with an outer folder, and a cover illustration by Bill Willingham. This adventure is continued in L2: The Assassin's Knot, and L3: Deep Dwarven Delve.

== Reception ==
The module was reviewed in issue No. 16 of Different Worlds magazine, which complained that TSR had abandoned its tradition of using maps as color art "in favor of pretty pictures irrelevant to the text". The reviewer, Anders Swenson, disliked the randomness of the module's encounters, arguing that it was unrealistic for so many monster nests to be found within a day's march of a hardy military garrison. His real problem with the adventure, however, was that he believed that too many encounters were compressed into too small of an area. "What deals and pacts have been made to permit the villagers, the clerics, the gnolls and wolves, and the inhabitants of Bone Hill to live in such harmony?"

Robert Kern reviewed The Secret of Bone Hill in Ares Magazine #12 and commented that "The good news is that TSR is publishing a new module for low level characters. The bad news is that it might require a more experienced DM to overcome it omissions and shotgun method of presenting information. "

The module was positively reviewed by Jim Bambra in issue No. 35 of White Dwarf magazine, who rated it 8 out of 10. Bambra felt that the fishing port of Restenford and its surrounding wilderness were given "particularly colourful" descriptions. He wrote that the module provided some very interesting roleplaying situations and an excellent background for a campaign, but "provides little more than this on a long term basis". He notes that some of the material would not be utilized until The Assassin's Knot (L2, unreleased at that time) was purchased, and that "trying to run this module on its own could prove to be a frustrating experience as the designer has given little indication of what L2 will contain or how many more modules there are likely to be." Bambra had hoped that the arrival of L2 would make The Secret of Bone Hill an enjoyable adventure.

Lawrence Schick in his book Heroic Worlds was critical of the module, calling it "Not one of TSR's more sterling endeavors," and noting that the back cover was "deliberately botched" by the artist (Erol Otus) "who didn't care for the product".

James Maliszewski claimed the module was one of his favorites because it created "a very flexible 'sandbox' framework for a low-level campaign".

Scott Taylor of Black Gate in 2015 gave the Lendore isles series an Honorable Mention in "The Top 10 Campaign Adventure Module Series of All Time, saying "for all its obvious benchmarks, Lendore is a muddle of 1st-5th level adventures without any true coherency."

== See also ==
- List of Dungeons & Dragons modules
