= Len Lakofka =

American writer (1944–2020)

- Born: Lenard William Lakofka; January 10, 1944; Chicago, Illinois, U.S.
- Died: October 23, 2020 (aged 76); Palm Desert, California, U.S.
- Occupations: Game designer, writer, editor
- Spouse: Gary Jackson
- Writing career
- Period: 1969–1986, 1997, 2009
- Genre: Role-playing games
- Notable work: Lendore Isles series adventure modules

Lenard William Lakofka (January 10, 1944 – October 23, 2020) was an American writer of material for the fantasy role-playing game Dungeons & Dragons. Although never a formal employee of TSR, the company that published Dungeons & Dragons, Lakofka was an influential voice in the development of the game. He was one of the playtesters of the game as it was being developed, an editor of early manuscripts, wrote a widely-read monthly D&D magazine column and two official D&D adventures, and had his home campaign setting of the Lendore Isles incorporated into Gary Gygax's World of Greyhawk Fantasy Game Setting.

== Early life ==
Lakofka was born January 10, 1944, in Illinois, to Alex Lakofka and Elsie Schumacher.

While living in Chicago in the 1960s, Len Lakofka became involved in wargames, including Avalon Hill's Diplomacy. His increasing interest in Diplomacy led him to join the International Federation of Wargamers, and through the IFW he met its vice-president, game designer Gary Gygax.

In 1968, Gygax convinced the IFW to organize a one-day convention called Gen Con at the Horticultural Hall in Lake Geneva, Wisconsin. Lakofka was by this time president of the IFW, and travelled to Lake Geneva to help set up, run events, and clean up. At the end of the day, before Gygax took down his sand table and locked up the Hall, he introduced a new set of miniatures rules to Lakofka and a few others. Those rules would subsequently be published as Chainmail, a precursor to D&D.

Back in Chicago in 1969, Lakofka wrote the first issue of his own "Dippy 'zine"—a fanzine devoted to Diplomacy—titled Liaisons Dangereuses. He would eventually publish 81 issues over the next eight years. In 1969, he also was the organizer of Gen Con II.

== Career ==
=== Gamer ===
At the first official AD&D tournament, held in January 1979 at Winter Fantasy, Lakofka was the second-place finisher. In 1980, he was listed as the 6th-ranked player in national D&D standings; and the same year, as a dungeon master, he placed third in the Invitational Dungeon Master's Tournament at Gen Con. (Frank Mentzer was the winner.)

Lakofka was also a bridge player. In 2006, he was listed in the Top 500 American Contract Bridge League Masterpoint Winners in Southern California. In 2008, his team from southern California was runner-up in Flight C of the Grand National Teams.

=== Game designer ===
In 1972, Gary Gygax and Dave Arneson began to co-develop a new role-playing game, which eventually led to the formation of Tactical Studies Rules (TSR) and the release of the first boxed sets of Dungeons & Dragons. In 1975, a year after D&D was published, articles about D&D began to appear in Lakofka's Dippy 'zine Liaisons Dangereuses. Although the names of both Lakofka and Gygax appeared in the articles' bylines, all of the articles were written by Lakofka alone—he added Gygax's name to preserve Gygax's copyright on D&D. Some of these articles were almost immediately republished in TSR's new magazine The Dragon. Lakofka started playing D&D in Chicago, using a player character named Leomund. He also created a D&D campaign world called Lendore Isle.

Although he was not a member of the TSR staff, Lakofka was frequently consulted as the Advanced Dungeons & Dragons (AD&D) rules were developed, and advised Gygax on rules he felt were unbalanced. Gygax passed Lakofka copies of the manuscripts for both the Players Handbook and the Dungeon Master's Guide. Lakofka edited the manuscripts and also contributed material to both books. After the rule books for AD&D were published, he created additional spells, magic items, and monsters, which were subsequently published in Dragon. He also wrote several more articles about AD&D in Dragon, and continued to help organize and run Diplomacy and AD&D events at Gen Con, which was now owned by TSR, Inc.

In 1979, Brian Blume of TSR approached Lakofka at a Seattle convention about writing AD&D adventures, and Lakofka agreed to write three modules for $10,500. Dragon editor Tim Kask also approached Lakofka about becoming a regular columnist, and in October 1979, Lakofka's monthly feature, Leomund's Tiny Hut, debuted in Issue #30.

In 1980, Lakofka submitted three modules to TSR, taken from adventures he had created for his home campaign of Lendore Isle: The Secret of Bone Hill, The Assassin's Knot, and Deep Dwarven Delve. Gary Gygax was simultaneously creating his World of Greyhawk Fantasy Game Setting, and Lakofka asked if "Lendore Isle" could be incorporated into Gygax's new world. Gygax agreed, and Lakofka chose the largest island in the Spindrift Isles archipelago as the location of his Lendore Isles adventures. This was the first material from an author other than Gygax or Rob Kuntz to be incorporated into the Greyhawk setting.

In 1981, Lakofka's first adventure, L1 The Secret of Bone Hill, was published. Reviews were mixed. In Different Worlds, Anders Swenson complained about the randomness of encounters, and that the monsters and townspeople were unrealistically compressed into too small a geographical area. However, White Dwarf's Jim Bambra gave it an 8 out of 10, and liked the roleplaying situations the module afforded. James Maliszewski claimed the module was one of his favorites because it created "a very flexible 'sandbox' framework for a low-level campaign".

In 1983, TSR published Lakofka's second adventure, L2 The Assassin's Knot. Reviews were again mixed. Rick Swan, in The Space Gamer, thought the murder mystery of the plot was "a very pedestrian affair", and the adventure was "just plain dull". Dave Morris in White Dwarf disagreed, calling it "an entertaining murder mystery for AD&D characters" and scoring it 7 out of 10. In 2004, Erik Mona and James Jacobs ranked The Assassin's Knot as the 29th greatest AD&D adventure ever written.

Lakofka also continued to write more articles in Dragon in addition to his monthly column. When Gygax was creating the World of Greyhawk, Lakofka suggested that, based on the migration patterns of various Greyhawk races as outlined in the campaign setting, "his" Lendore Isles would have been mainly settled by Suel. When the twelve gods of the Suel pantheon of gods were simply listed in the 1983 edition of the World of Greyhawk Fantasy Game Setting, with no details or powers given, Lakofka took it upon himself to flesh out descriptions of each god. In 1984, Lakofka published this information as a major five-part series in Dragon.

=== After TSR ===
Lakofka's third Lendore Isles adventure, L3 Deep Dwarven Delve, was scheduled to be released in 1986, and Lakofka planned to write two more "L" series adventures. However, in a power struggle at TSR at the end of 1985, Lakofka's long-time friend Gary Gygax was ousted from the company. The new company management did not want to do business with friends of Gygax, and plans to publish Lakofka's third adventure were shelved. Lakofka also stopped writing his Leomund's Tiny Hut column for Dragon; his final column was published in April 1986 (Issue #108).

After this, Lakofka moved from Chicago to California and wrote no more AD&D material for TSR. It was not until TSR was taken over by Wizards of the Coast (WotC) in 1997 and the World of Greyhawk setting was revived that Lakofka was approached about finally publishing L3 Deep Dwarven Delve as part of the 25th Anniversary Collector's Boxed Set. Because of changes to the D&D rules over the intervening decade, Lakofka worked with WotC staff to update the adventure. Lakofka stated that WotC lost his final rewrite before publication, but rather than telling him, someone at WotC inserted new material into an older manuscript before it was published. Lakofka claimed as a result that about 20% of the final product was not his own work.

Lakofka continued to work on further adventures in the "L" series, and in 2009, the fourth installment, L4 Devilspawn, was released by Dragonsfoot.org as a free download. Lakofka also created a fifth module, L5 The Kroten Campaign, which was released in 3 parts by Dragonsfoot.org as a free download. Lakofka mused about writing up to four more "L" adventures, but ultimately these were never created.

Starting in 2019, Lenard became a regular on the LordGosumba Twitch channel, discussing Greyhawk and D&D.

== Personal life ==
Lakofka married Gary Jackson. Lakofka died from myeloid leukemia on October 23, 2020, aged 76, in his home. He was cremated after his death.
