= The Land Beyond the Magic Mirror =

Dungeons & Dragons adventure module

- Code: EX2
- TSR product code: 9073
- Rules required: 1st Ed. AD&D
- Campaign setting: Generic / Greyhawk
- Authors: Gary Gygax
- First published: 1983

Linked modules
- EX1 EX2

The Land Beyond the Magic Mirror (EX2) is an adventure module, written for use with the first edition Advanced Dungeons & Dragons roleplaying game. It is set in the World of Greyhawk campaign setting.

== Plot summary ==
In this module, the player characters (PCs) plummet into a strange partial plane. They encounter the Jabberwock, the Bandersnatch, and the Walrus and the Carpenter, and become involved in a gigantic game of Chess.

== Publication history ==
This module, like its companion Dungeonland, is a close adaptation of a work of fiction by Lewis Carroll (in this case, Through the Looking-Glass). The module was written by Gary Gygax and illustrated by Jim Holloway. It was published by TSR in 1983 as a 32-page booklet with an outer folder. An appendix to the module notes that Gygax adapted the module from his own D&D campaign.

To maintain the element of surprise, the module advises dungeon masters (DMs) to keep the players in the dark about what is happening as long as possible, although well-read players will eventually recognize the literary source of the encounters.

In keeping with its sense of oddity and surprise, the cover of this module depicts a scene from its companion adventure EX1 Dungeonland (a battle with a hangman tree). Similarly, the cover image of EX1 Dungeonland shows an encounter from this module (the attack of the roc raven).

Dungeonland and The Land Beyond the Magic Mirror were designed to allow the DM to place them as an extension of any existing dungeon intended for 9th-12th level characters.

== Reception ==
Jim Bambra of White Dwarf magazine positively reviewed the module in issue 48, rating it 9 out of 10. He enjoyed the "rich vein of humour" that runs through both this module and Dungeonland. He felt that, while the modules could be played individually, they work best when played together as they frequently interconnect, and player characters adventuring in one module could suddenly find themselves in the other. Bambra felt that, since the modules were designed for higher-level characters, some of the encounters were inaccessible for lower-level characters. Despite this, he concluded that if players had high-level characters available, they should "by all means play them, you won't regret it."

Russell Grant Collins reviewed The Land Beyond the Magic Mirror for Fantasy Gamer magazine and stated that, "In conclusion, I find it hard to recommend this module except to people who simply adore [Lewis Carroll] and would like to see an adventure based on his works. I personally think that a good change-of-pace adventure could be created using the [Alice in Wonderland] books as a source, but I'd be inclined to make it of a lower level."

Anders Swenson reviewed both Dungeonland and The Land Beyond the Magic Mirror for Different Worlds magazine and stated that "Given the limits of AD&D, this is not a bad job. The idea, of course, is not to rewrite Alice but to construct a fantasy role-playing game with encounters similar to those found in the two sourcebooks. And, with this perspective in mind, the two adventures succeed nicely. I would rate these two modules as excellent, certainly among the most imaginative adventures published in our hobby."
