= Spider and the Fly =

Spider and the Fly may refer to:

== Film and television ==
- The Spider and the Fly (1916 film), an American silent drama film
- The Spider and the Fly (1931 film), a Silly Symphony cartoon
- Spider and the Fly (1936 film) or Rogue of the Range, an American western directed by S. Roy Luby
- The Spider and the Fly (1949 film), a British crime film directed by Robert Hamer
- "The Spider and the Fly" (Lioness), a 2026 television episode
- "Spider and the Fly" (NCIS), a 2010 television episode
- "The Spider and the Fly" (Spider-Man), a 1967 television episode

== Literature ==
- "The Spider and the Fly" (poem), an 1829 poem by Mary Howitt
- The Spider and the Fly (DiTerlizzi book), a 2002 children's picture book by Tony DiTerlizzi
- The Spider and the Fly (Rowe book), a 2017 nonfiction book by Claudia Rowe

== Music ==
- "The Spider and the Fly" (song), by the Rolling Stones, 1965
- "Spider and the Fly", a 1946 song by Myra Taylor

== See also ==
- The spider and the fly problem, a mathematical puzzle with an unintuitive solution
