= Cultural depictions of spiders =

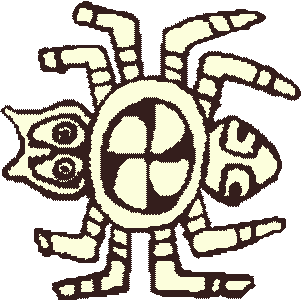
Spider image from a conch shell gorget at the Great Mound at Spiro, Oklahoma

Throughout history, spiders have been depicted in popular culture, mythology, and symbolism. From African folklore to Greek mythology, the spider has been used to represent a variety of things, and endures into the present day with characters such as Shelob from The Lord of the Rings and Spider-Man from the eponymous comic series. It is also a symbol of mischief and malice for its toxic venom and the slow death it causes, which is often seen as a curse. In addition, the spider has inspired creations from an ancient geoglyph to a modern steampunk spectacle. Spiders have been the focus of fears, stories and mythologies of various cultures for centuries.

The spider has symbolized patience and persistence due to its hunting technique of setting webs and waiting for its prey to become ensnared. Numerous cultures attribute the spider's ability to spin webs with the origin of spinning, textile weaving, basket weaving, knotwork, string games and net making. Spiders are associated with creation myths because they seem to weave their own artistic worlds. Philosophers often use the spider's web as a metaphor or analogy, and today, terms such as the Internet or World Wide Web evoke the inter-connectivity of a spider web.

Many goddesses associated with spiders and other female portrayals reflect observations of their specific female-dominated copulation.

== In folklore and mythology ==
The spider, along with its web, is featured in mythological fables, cosmology, artistic spiritual depictions, and in oral traditions throughout the world since ancient times. The spider was syncretically associated with the goddess Neith of Ancient Egypt (merging with Mesometanian Inanna and Astarte of the Near East) in her aspect as spinner and weaver of destiny, this link continuing through the Babylonian Ishtar deity and associated with the mortal Greek Arachne.

=== Africa ===
In Ancient Egyptian mythology, the goddess Neith, by virtue of her association with weaving, is also linked to spiders. In African traditional folklore, the spider is often personified as a trickster character. The most prominent example from West Africa is Kwaku Ananse of the Ashanti, anglicized as Aunt Nancy (or Sister Nancy) in the West Indies and other parts of the Americas, among many incarnations.

Stories of Ananse became such a central part of Ashanti oral culture that the word Anansesem—"spider tales"—came to encompass all kinds of fables. These narratives were subsequently transmitted as Anansi toree to children of Maroon people and other Africans in the diaspora. These tales are allegorical stories that often also teach a moral lesson. Similarly, Major A.J.N. Tremearne observed that the Hausa also view the spider with high esteem as the most cunning of all animals and the king of all stories, even employing similar narrative storytelling devices of the Akan-Ashanti by attributing each of them to the spider, identified as Gizzo or Gizo in the Hausa language.

=== Asia ===
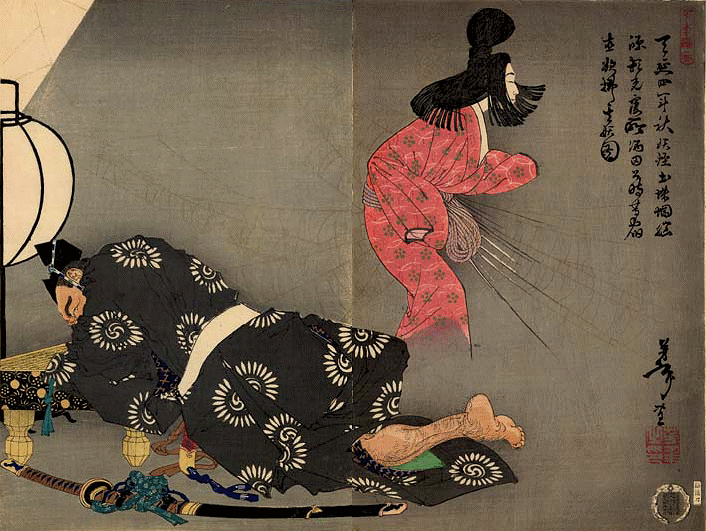
Apparition of the Spider Princess Depicting a Tsuchigumo (top right) Woodblock print by Yoshitoshi, 1887

The Tsuchigumo (translated as "Earth spiders") (Note: The term Tsuchigumo also refers to a mythical ethnic group said to live in caverns beneath the mountains in the Japanese Alps until at least the Asuka period; also loosely used for bandits and thieves.) of Japan, is a mythical, supernatural creature faced by the legendary Minamoto no Raiko. Depending on the version of the story, the Tsuchigumo was able to take the visage of either a boy or a woman. In one version, while on a search for a mythical giant skull, Raiko is lured to a dilapidated house using an illusion of a floating skull. Raiko and his companion Watanabe no Tsuna killed the Tsuchigumo at the end of the story, releasing spiders the size of children from its belly.

Another Japanese mythological spider figure is the Jorōgumo ("prostitute spider") which is portrayed as being able to transform into a seductive woman. In some instances, the Jorōgumo attempts to seduce and perhaps marry passing samurai. In other instances she is venerated as a goddess dwelling in the Jōren Falls who saves people from drowning. Her name also refers to a golden orb-spider species Trichonephila clavata (Jorō-gumo, which translates to "binding bride" or "whore spider").

In the Philippines, there is a Visayan folk tale version of The Spider and the Fly which explains why the spider hates the fly.

Uttu, the ancient Sumerian goddess of weaving, was often depicted as a spider spinning her web. In the myth of the water god Enki and Ninsikila, the mountain mother goddess, Uttu is presented as Enki's daughter. The narrative recounts that Enki's wife, Ninhursag, warned Uttu that Enki sought sexual intimacy with her. Uttu then enclosed herself within her web, but eventually allowed Enki to enter after he offered marriage and a gift of fresh produce. After consuming the produce, the myth states that Enki brought her beer. After she became intoxicated from the beer, Enki raped her in an attempt to consummate the marriage. Hearing Uttu's distress, Ninhursag intervened, extracting Enki's bodily fluid from her and planting it in the ground, which then gave rise to eight new types of plants.

Muslim tradition often suggests that spiders should be respected. This belief is partly attributed to a widely recounted story (Note: However, this Hadith's chain of narration is considered weak by some Islamic scholars) According to this narrative, when Muhammad and Abu Bakr took refuge in the Cave of Thawr, a spider spun a web across the cave's entrance. The undisturbed nature of this web, (along with a dove's nest) at the entrance led their Quraysh pursuers to believe that no one could have recently entered the cave without disturbing these natural elements, thereby causing them to bypass the hiding place. Additionally, the Quran includes a parable in Surah Al-Ankabut (Chapter 29, "The Spider"), which states: 'The parable of those who take protectors other than Allah is that of the spider who takes refuge in a house. And indeed, the flimsiest of houses is the house of the spider, if they only knew."^{[Quran 29:41]} While this parable uses the spider's web as a metaphor for the fragility of reliance on anything other than Allah, the naming of a Surah after the spider signifies its symbolic importance within Islamic discourse.

A similar story to the spider cave Hadith appears in the Alphabet of Sirach about the story of David hiding in a cave from Saul found in 1 Samuel: 24. David asks God about the purpose of spiders (and wasps) to the world. God explains that he will understand their purpose in due time. Later, when David is a fugitive and Saul examines the cave in which David is hiding, he noticed a spider and web at the cave's entrance. Saul concludes that David could not be hiding in the cave. When David exits the cave, he kisses and blesses the spider.

=== Americas ===
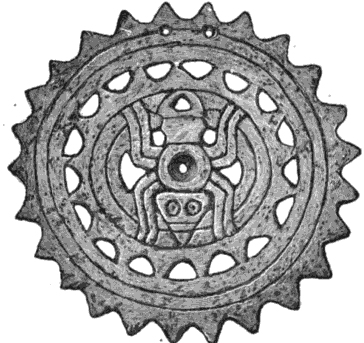
Spider depicted on a shell gorget by the Stone Grave people, from a mound on Fain's Island, Tennessee

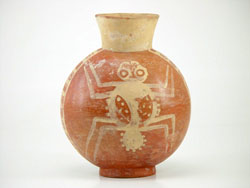
Ancient Moche people of Peru depict spiders in their art, such as this Larco Museum ceramic, ca. 300 CE.

North American cultures have traditionally depicted spiders. The Native American Lakota people's oral tradition also includes a spider-trickster figure, which is known by several names. As chronicled in the legend of The "Wasna" (Pemmican) Man and the Unktomi (Spider), a man encounters a hungry spider family, and the hero Stone Boy is tricked out of his fancy clothes by Unktomi, a trickster spider figure. In some Native American myths, the spider is also seen in the legend about the origin of the constellation Ursa Major. The constellation was seen as seven men transformed into stars and climbing to paradise by unrolling a spider's web. The Hopi have the creation myth of Spider Grandmother. In this story, Spider Grandmother thought the world into existence through the conscious weaving of her webs. Spider Grandmother also plays an important role in the creation mythology of the Navajo, and there are stories relating to Spider Woman in the heritage of many Southwestern native cultures as a powerful helper and teacher. In Mesoamerica, the Great Goddess of Teotihuacan may represent a similar figure.

The South American Moche people of ancient Peru worshiped nature; they placed emphasis on animals and often depicted spiders in their art. The people of the Nazca culture created expansive geoglyphs, including a large depiction of a spider on the Nazca plain in southern Peru. The purpose or meaning of the so-called "Nazca lines" is still uncertain. An adobe spider-god temple of the Cupisnique culture was discovered in the Lambayeque Region of Peru. It is part of the Ventarron temple complex and is known as Collud. The Cupisnique spider deity was associated with hunting nets, textiles, war, and power. One image depicts spider deities holding nets filled with decapitated human heads.

=== Europe ===
A notable ancient legend from the Western canon that explains the origin of the spider is the Greek myth of Arachne, a story of a weaving competition between the mortal Arachne and the goddess Athena. While its precise origins are debated, possibly stemming from Lydian mythology, (Note: Lydian mythology is virtually unknown, therefore myths involving Lydia are mainly from Greek mythology.) the myth was briefly mentioned by Virgil in 29 BC, (Note: "Or spider, victim of Minerva's spite, Athwart the doorway hangs her swaying net. The more impoverished they, the keenlier all To mend the fallen fortunes of their race." Virgil (ca. 029 B.C.) The Georgics (IV; lines 246—247)) and became widely known through Ovid's poem Metamorphoses, written between AD 2 and 8. The Greek word "arachne" (αράχνη) means "spider", and is the origin of Arachnida, the spiders' taxonomic class. The myth of Arachne recounts her story of being a renowned weaver from Hypaepa of Lydia; as the daughter of a prominent Tyrian purple wool dyer. Arachne's skill in weaving led her to boast that she surpassed even the goddess Athena. Challenging Athena to a contest, Arachne wove a tapestry depicting the infidelities of the Olympian gods while Athena depicted her victory over Poseidon that earned her the patronage of Athens. Though Athena acknowledged the flawless quality of Arachne's work, she was enraged by the mortal's extreme hubris. In a fit of anger, Athena destroyed Arachne's tapestry and loom. Overcome with shame and despair, Arachne then attempted to hang herself. Taking pity on her, Athena transformed Arachne into a spider, sprinkling her with a magical liquid (Note: Ovid describes this as "extract of herbs of Hecate"; Hecate being the Greek goddess and sorceress said to have invented the poison aconite (Aconitum napellus).) "—and ever since, Arachne, as a spider, weaves her web."

A lesser-known variation of the myth of Arachne, apparently originating in Attica, states that Athena transformed both Arachne and her brother Phalanx (whose name also translates to spider) (Note: The diminutive form "phalangion" (φαλάγγιον) was the standard ancient Greek term that historically referred to a type of venomous spider, most closely associated with the Loxosceles genus.) into spiders for committing incest, a violation against her teachings. Scholar Robert Graves proposed that Ovid's tale may have its roots in the commercial rivalry between the Athenian citizenry of Greece and Miletus in Asia Minor, a city that flourished around 2000 BC. In Miletus, the spider may have been an important figure, as evidenced by seals with spider emblems recovered from the site.

The 10th-century Saint Conrad of Constance is sometimes represented as a bishop holding a chalice with a spider. According to this story, while he was celebrating Easter Mass, a spider fell into the chalice. Ignoring the commonly held belief of the time that all or most spiders were poisonous, as a token of faith, Conrad nevertheless drank the wine with the spider in it.

For King Robert the Bruce of Scotland, the spider is depicted as an inspirational symbol, according to an early 14th-century legend. (Note: There are many versions of the story, and historians are unsure of the legend's truth and suggest that it is apocryphal.) The legend tells of Robert the Bruce's encounter with a spider during the time of a series of military failures against the English. One version tells that while taking refuge in a cave on Rathlin Island, he witnesses a spider continuously failing to climb its silken thread to its web. However, due to perseverance the spider eventually succeeds, demonstrating that "if at first you don't succeed, try, try and try again". Taking this as being symbolic of hope and perseverance, Bruce came out of hiding and eventually won Scotland's independence.

In the 15th century, the French king Louis XI acquired the nickname "the universal spider" (l'universelle aragne), from Georges Chastellain, a chronicler of the dukes of Burgundy, referring to the king's tendency to implement schemes and plans during his contention with Burgundy and the following conflicts with Charles the Bold who compared the king to a spider.

In Polish folklore and literature, Pan Twardowski - a sorcerer who made a deal with the Devil – is depicted as having escaped from the Devil who was taking him to Hell, and ending up living on the Moon, his only companion being a spider; from time to time Twardowski lets the spider descend to Earth on a thread and bring him news and gossip from the world below.

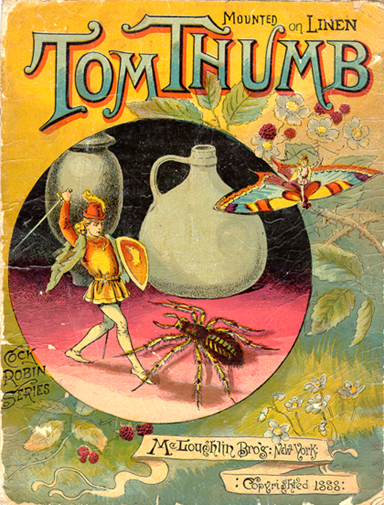
Children's edition, 1888

Several versions of the Tom Thumb story include Tom Thumb's death by a spider bite. In an 18th-century poem, his death is portrayed in the following verses:

The spider watching for his Prey,
Tom took to be a fly,
And seized him without delay,
Regarding not his cry.

The blood out of his body drains,
He yielded up his breath;
Thus he was freed from all Pains,
By his unlook'd for death.

=== Oceania ===
Spiders are depicted in Indigenous Australian art, in rock and bark paintings, and for clan totems. Spiders in their webs are associated with a sacred rock in central Arnhem Land on the Burnungku clan estate of the Rembarrnga/Kyne people. Their totem design is connected with a major regional ceremony, providing a connection with neighboring clans that also have spider totems in their rituals. Nareau, the Lord Spider, created the universe, according to the traditional Cosmology of Oceania's Kiribati islanders of the Tungaru archipelago (Gilbert Islands); similarly, Areop-Enap ("Old Spider") plays an important part in the creation myth of the traditional Nauru islanders of Micronesia.

== In philosophy ==
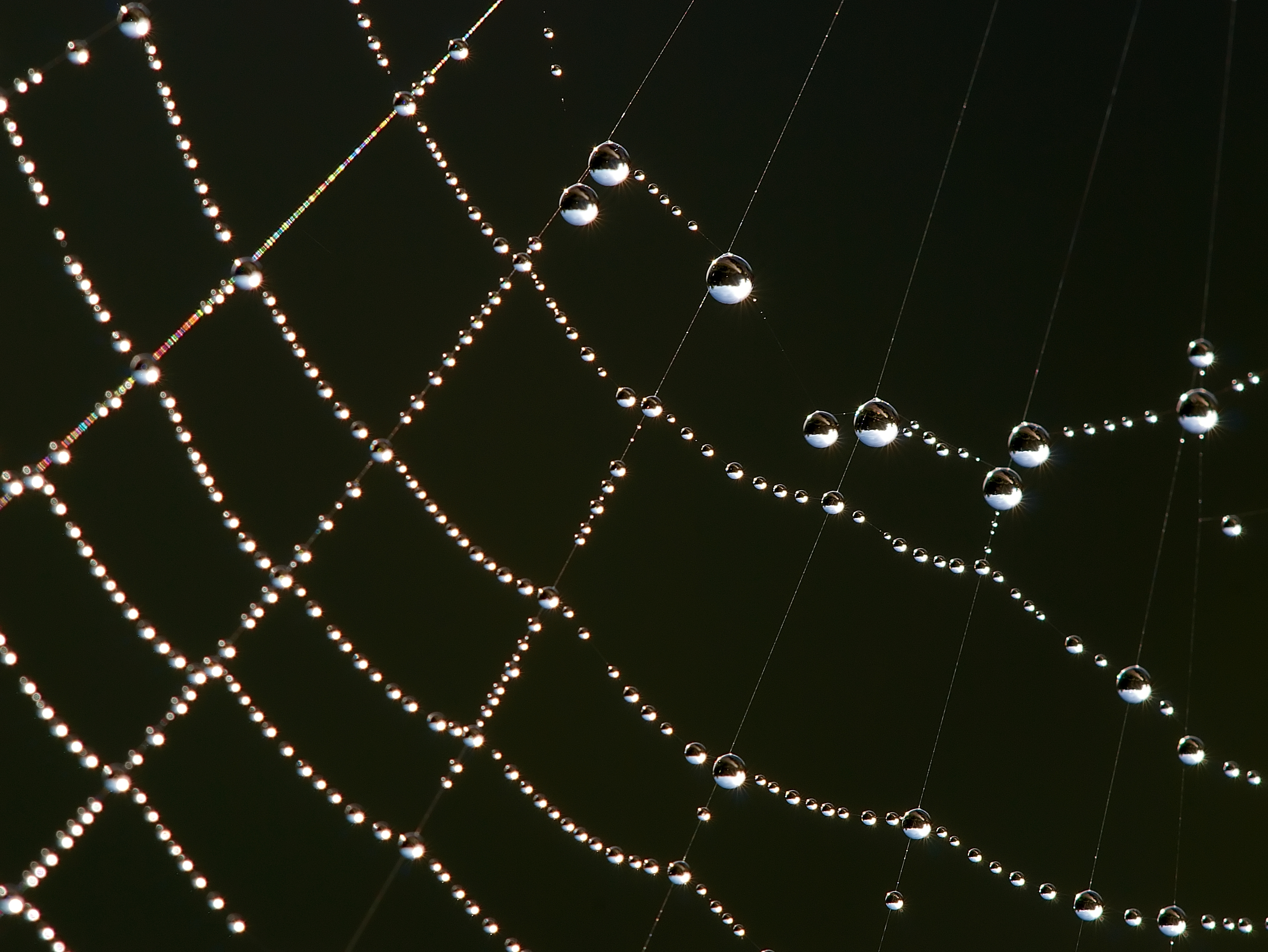
"Imagine a multidimensional spider's web in the early morning covered with dew drops. And every dew drop contains the reflection of all the other dew drops. And, in each reflected dew drop, the reflections of all the other dew drops in that reflection. And so ad infinitum. That is the Buddhist conception of the universe in an image." —Alan Watts, Following The Middle Way

In the Vedic philosophy of India, the spider is depicted as hiding the ultimate reality with the veils of illusion. Indra's net (Note: The Vedic god Indra is referred to as Śakra in Buddhism, or with the title Devānām Indra.) is used as a metaphor for the Buddhist concept of interpenetration, which holds that all phenomena are intimately connected. Indra's net has a multifaceted jewel at each vertex, and each jewel is reflected in all of the other jewels.

As related in the book Vermeer's Hat by historian Timothy Brook:

When Indra fashioned the world, he made it as a web, and at every knot in the web is tied a pearl. Everything that exists, or has ever existed, every idea that can be thought about, every datum that is true—every dharma, in the language of Indian philosophy—is a pearl in Indra's net. Not only is every pearl tied to every other pearl by virtue of the web on which they hang, but on the surface of every pearl is reflected every other jewel on the net. Everything that exists in Indra's web implies all else that exists.

== In literature ==
The epic poem Metamorphoses, written by Ovid two millennia ago, includes the metamorphosis of Arachne. This was retold in Dante Alighieri's depiction as the half-spider Arachne in the second book of his Divine Comedy, Purgatorio.

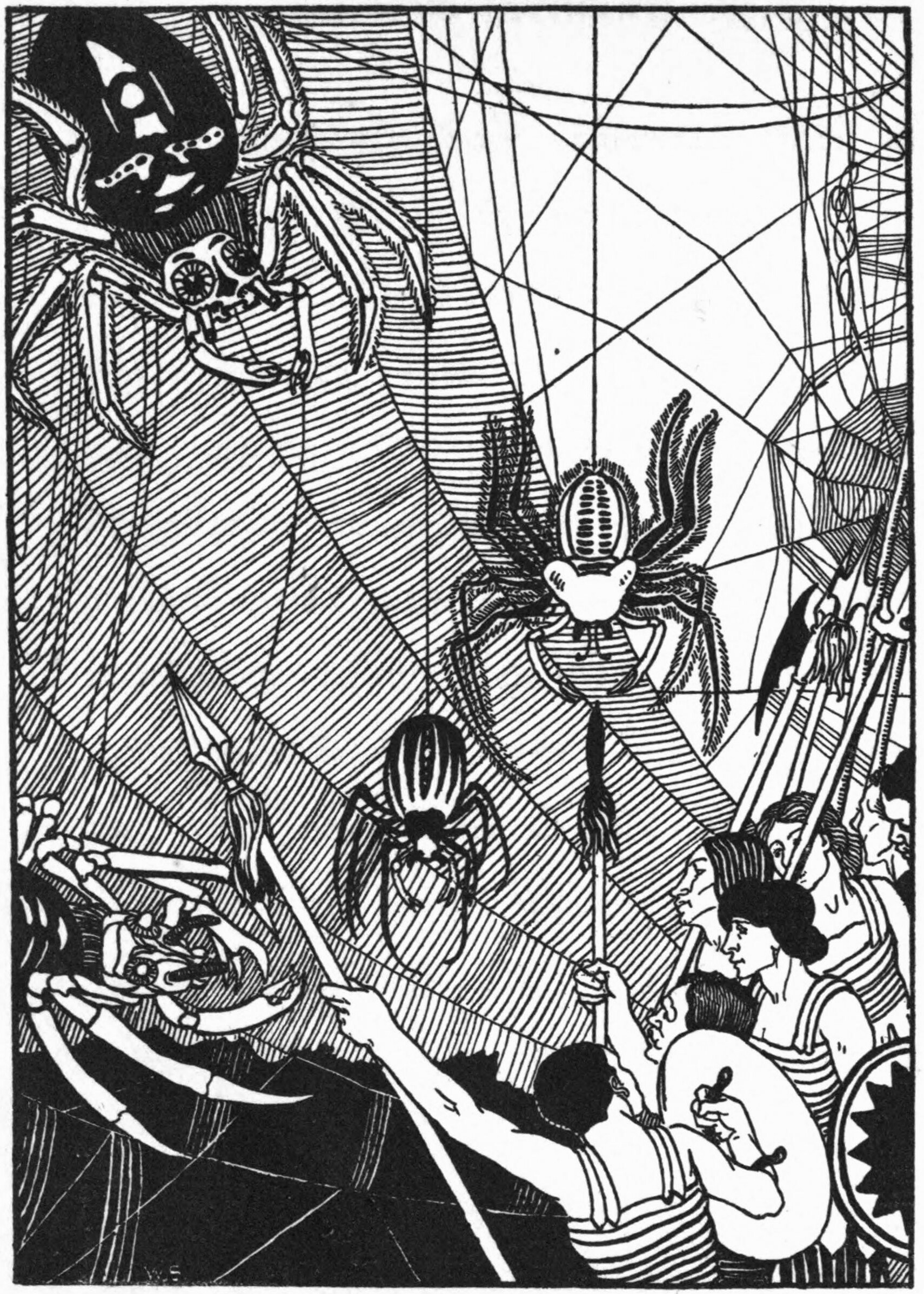
The 2nd century novel A True Story includes a battle with giant spiders, as depicted in this 1894 illustration

Considered as the earliest known work of science fiction in Western literature, the 2nd-century satirical novel A True Story by Lucian of Samosata includes a battle between the People of the Moon and the People of the Earth featuring giant spiders that are "bigger than the islands of Cyclades".

In the 16th-century Chinese folk novel, Wu Cheng'en's Journey to the West, the Buddhist monk Tang Sanzang's odyssey includes being trapped in a spider's cave and bound by beautiful women and many children, who are transformations of spiders.

Published in 1808, the poem Marmion by Walter Scott (Note: Often misattributed to Shakespeare, specifically from Macbeth) includes the popularly quoted line:

Oh! what a tangled web we weave
When first we practise to deceive!

The spider gained an evil reputation from the 1842 Biedermeier novella by Jeremias Gotthelf, The Black Spider. In this allegorical tale that was adapted to various media, the spider symbolizes evil works and represents the moral consequences of making a pact with the devil.

Giant spiders guarding a treasure or fortress are prominent in fantasy literature as "The Fortress Unvanquishable, Save for Sacnoth" (1908) by Lord Dunsany and "The Tower of the Elephant" (1933) by Robert E. Howard. Atlach-Nacha is the creation of Clark Ashton Smith and first appeared in his short story "The Seven Geases" (1934). Atlach-Nacha resembles a huge spider with an almost-human face. In the story, Atlach-Nacha is the reluctant recipient of a human sacrifice given to it by the toad-god Tsathoggua.

Spiders serve as a recurring motif in the works of J. R. R. Tolkien. (Note: Tolkien's use of giant spiders as foes was predated by Lord Dunsany, from two stories written in 1907 and 1910.) Tolkien included giant spiders in his 1937 book The Hobbit where they roamed Mirkwood, attacking and sometimes capturing the main characters. The character of Ungoliant is featured as a spiderlike entity, and as a personification of Night from his earliest writings. In The Lord of the Rings, the creature's final surviving daughter Shelob is encountered as Frodo and Sam move through the mountain pass of Cirith Ungol. Shelob was featured in the film adaption of the last book of the Lord of the Rings series. Although described as giant spiders, Tolkien gave them fictional attributes such as compound eyes, beaks and the spinning of black webs. He also resurrected the Old English words cob and lob for "spider".

A key element of Richard Matheson's novel The Shrinking Man and the film based on it The Incredible Shrinking Man is the struggle of the protagonist, shrunken to the size of an insect, with a voracious spider – ending with his waging an epic battle and killing the spider.

The 1952 children's novel Charlotte's Web by E. B. White is notable in its portrayal of the spider in a positive manner as a heroine rather than an object of fear or horror.

More recently, giant spiders have featured in books such as the 1998 fantasy novel Harry Potter and the Chamber of Secrets by J. K. Rowling. This book was later followed by a motion picture of the same name, using the giant spider Aragog from the novel as a supporting character and friend of groundskeeper, Hagrid. In Fantastic Beasts and Where to Find Them, a book about many of the creatures within the Wizarding World, these giant spiders are also known as Acromantulas.

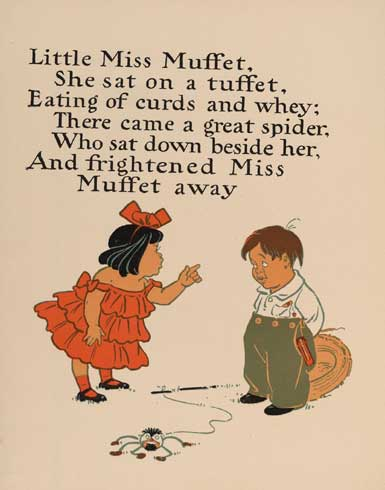
William Wallace Denslow's illustrations for Little Miss Muffet, from a 1901 edition of Mother Goose

The spider is also found in modern children's tales. The nursery rhymes "Itsy Bitsy Spider" and "Little Miss Muffet" have spiders as focal characters. The poem "The Spider and the Fly" (1829) by Mary Howitt is a cautionary tale of seduction and betrayal which inspired a 1949 film and a 1965 Rolling Stones song, each sharing the same title, as well as a 1923 cartoon by Aesop Fables Studio.

The poet Walt Whitman describes a ballooning spider in his 1868 poem, A Noiseless Patient Spider.

Author Neil Gaiman popularised the African spider god Anansi in his book, Anansi Boys, where the protagonist learns that the trickster god was his father.

== In media ==
=== In comics and manga ===
In graphic novels, spiders are often adapted by superheroes or villains as their symbols or alter egos due to the arachnid's strengths and weaknesses. One of the most notable characters in comic book history has taken his identity from the spider, the Marvel comic book hero Spider-Man. Peter Parker was accidentally bitten by a radioactive spider and then, as Spider-Man, was able to scale tall buildings and shoot web fluid from a device attached to his wrist. Along with these abilities came super senses and instant reflexes. Writer Stan Lee and artist Steve Ditko originated this franchise. Due to the character's popularity, Spider-Man appeared in movies and various other media. In addition to Spider-Man, the Marvel Universe includes several subsequent characters using the spider as their patron; including Silk, Spider-Woman, Spider-Girl, the Scarlet Spider, Venom, Black Widow, Tarantula and Anya Corazon, who adopts the superhero names Araña and (the third) Spider-Girl. The DC Comics universe also include characters named Spider Girl and the Tarantula.

Many other comic book, manga and anime characters have taken the guise of a spider, such as the Black Spider from the Batman universe; in the Pokémon franchise, Spinarak and Ariados, Joltik and Galvantula, and Dewpider and Araquanid, Tarountula and Spidops, are all variously based on spiders. In the Static Shock series, the titular character meets another superhero called Anansi the Spider in Africa. He takes his name from the African trickster god.

The light novel and manga series So I'm a Spider, So What?, the protagonist is turned into a spider at the beginning of the story. Trapped in a world based around Japanese role-playing game tropes, she makes use of webs, various types of traps and poison attacks, and her intellect to survive.

=== In film and television ===
Spiders have been present for many decades both in film and on television, predominantly in the horror genre. Those who suffer from arachnophobia, an acute fear of spiders, become particularly horrified. The spider web is used as a motif to adorn dark passageways, depicting the recesses of the unknown.

A spider is the calling card for the criminal gang in Fritz Lang's 1919~1920 serial, The Spiders

Spider themes are featured in early film history. In Fritz Lang's 1919 and 1920 The Spiders adventure series, a spider is the calling card for "The Spiders" criminal organization. The 1924 silent fantasy movie The Thief of Bagdad, and his 1940 remake, contains a scene of a fight with a gigantic spider. Pan Si Dong (1927), 盘丝洞, (The Cave of the Silken Web) is a film adaptation of the classic tale of Xuánzàng's encounter from a chapter of the 16th-century Great Classical Novel, Journey to the West, and was remade as a 1967 Hong Kong cinema production.

Many horror films have featured the spider, including 1955's Tarantula!, exploiting America's fear of atomic radiation during the nuclear arms race, the 1975 low-budget cult film The Giant Spider Invasion, and Kingdom of the Spiders, a 1977 film starring William Shatner as a veterinarian who found himself facing a horde of spiders hiding in Verde Valley, Arizona.

The fear of spiders culminates in Arachnophobia, a 1990 movie in which spiders multiply in large numbers. On the other hand, a person who admires spiders is referred to as an "arachnophile"; such as Virginia, a demented orphan who likes to play deadly spider games in the black comedy horror B movie, Spider Baby.

The Godzilla franchise includes a giant spiderlike kaiju named Kumonga ("Spiga" in the English versions), first appearing in 1967's Son of Godzilla. The 1999 film Wild Wild West features a giant mechanical spider. Experiments with spiders in space tend to go horribly wrong, as with a DNA experiment on board a NASA space shuttle in the 2000 film Spiders, or mutant spiders from a derelict Soviet space station in the 2013 film Spiders 3D. Before there were Snakes on a Plane (2006), there were spiders on a plane in Tarantulas: The Deadly Cargo (1977). Radiation and spiders once again combine to wreak havoc in the 2002 film spoof Eight Legged Freaks, this time due to nuclear waste.

Several books featuring spiders have been adapted to film, including The Hobbit: The Desolation of Smaug, The Lord of the Rings: The Return of the King featuring Shelob and Harry Potter and the Chamber of Secrets with Aragog the Acromantula. Charlotte A. Cavatica's positive portrayal of a spider character can be seen in two full-length feature versions of Charlotte's Web. The first Charlotte's Web was a Hanna-Barbera musical animated film released in 1973, followed by a live-action 2006 film version of the original story. Walt Disney Pictures produced the 1996 film James and the Giant Peach based on the 1961 novel of the same name by Roald Dahl, in which the abused orphan James, who is only friends with a spider, finds more insect friends such as Spider and Centipede after entering a magical peach.

In Ingmar Bergman's 1961 Swedish film adaptation Through a Glass Darkly, the psychotic Karin believes she has an encounter with God as a spider. Surreal spider imagery symbolism and themes are featured prominently in the 2013 psychological thriller Enemy; director Denis Villeneuve's film adaptation of the novel The Double by José Saramago.

On television, the 1990 miniseries Stephen King's It is based on his novel It, where the now adult members of the Losers' club confront the giant spider form of Pennywise.

Giant spiders have featured several times in television series Doctor Who. The 1974 serial Planet of the Spiders revolves around a mutated species of spiders called the Eight Legs, created by exposure to crystals from another planet. The plot of the 2018 episode "Arachnids in the UK" revolves around an infestation of giant spiders that has occurred as the result of a scientific experiment. The 2025 episode "The Story & the Engine" also features a giant mechanical spider and allusions to Anansi. Several aliens in the series are based on spiders, such as the Racnoss in the 2006 special "The Runaway Bride" and bacteria in the 2014 episode "Kill the Moon".

The 2002 David Cronenberg film Spider features spider and cobweb symbolism, with the main character acquiring the nickname 'Spider' due to his resemblance to one.

A 2008 episode of MonsterQuest talked about monster spiders in the Amazon rain forest.

=== In music ===
The Rolling Stones adapted themes from Mary Howitt's poem in their 1965 song "The Spider and the Fly". Released in 1966, "Boris the Spider" was the first song written by John Entwistle for The Who, and became a staple of their live concerts. In 1987 David Bowie released a song "Glass Spider" which would later serve as the name for his Glass Spider Tour. Previously Bowie had a backing band known as The Spiders from Mars who would lend their name to his 1972 album The Rise and Fall of Ziggy Stardust and the Spiders from Mars.

"Spiderwebs" became a hit for No Doubt in 1995. (Note: 39 weeks on the Billboard Hot 100 chart, peak position: #18) Alice Cooper's 2008 concept album, Along Came a Spider is about a fictitious serial killer known as 'Spider', who wraps his victims in silk and cuts off one of their legs in order to create his own eight-legged arachnoid.

=== In games ===
Giant spiders appear in several role-playing games, such as Lolth, the Spider Queen of Dungeons & Dragons, and the first edition of Warcraft, where spiders are described as being "of staggering size—perhaps 15 feet around—with great furred body." Lolth is the main goddess of the dark elves. Their strongly matriarchal society is also in line with the real world female spiders who consume males during, or after copulation.

In video games, spiders or spider-shaped foes are common, such as the Metroid series where the Prime trilogy's antagonist, Metroid Prime, has a spiderlike Metroid as her primary physical form. This trilogy also includes the Ing, antagonists of Echoes, whose warrior forms resemble five-legged spiders. Atlach-Nacha is an H-game centered on a spiderlike demoness disguising herself as a human. In The Legend of Zelda series, giant spiders are a frequent foe. In particular, Ocarina of Time features large spiders named Skulltulas, and Twilight Princess has an enormous spider boss. Monster Hunter 4 introduced monster a called the Nerscylla, described in game as a "Temnoceran," based on the Chelicerate subphylum of arthropods, along with its subspecies, the Shrouded Nerscylla. An anthropomorphic spiderlike creature based on Little Miss Muffet named Muffet is featured in the 2015 video game Undertale. Giant spiders appear as hostile enemies in The Elder Scrolls V: Skyrim which were quickly modded into bears by the players. Creatures resembling spiders are common in the Pikmin series (either called Long Legs or Dweevil), however these only have 4 legs.

In the Lego toyline Bionicle series, the Visorak horde is a species consisting of six spiderlike breeds. They are created by the Brotherhood of Makuta to conquer islands; they possess mutagenic venom and spin sticky green webs. In the Transformers franchise, Tarantulas and Blackarachnia are both Predacons that turn into giant spiders.

=== In sports ===
Notable athletes with spider nicknames include Olympic skier Spider Sabich, so named by his father due to his long, thin arms and legs as a baby, and UFC Middleweight Champion Anderson "The Spider" Silva who was dubbed "Brazil's Spiderman" by an announcer who thought he looked like a superhero in the ring. Spider mascots are associated with the Cleveland Spiders baseball team and the San Francisco Spiders hockey team, as well as the University of Richmond's athletic teams.

=== Other depictions in media ===
Information technology terms such as the "web spider" (or "web crawler") and the World Wide Web imply the spiderlike connection of information accessed on the Internet.

A dance, the tarantella, refers to the purported victims of a bite from the spider Lycosa tarantula which were allegedly compelled to dance until they were exhausted.

== In visual arts ==
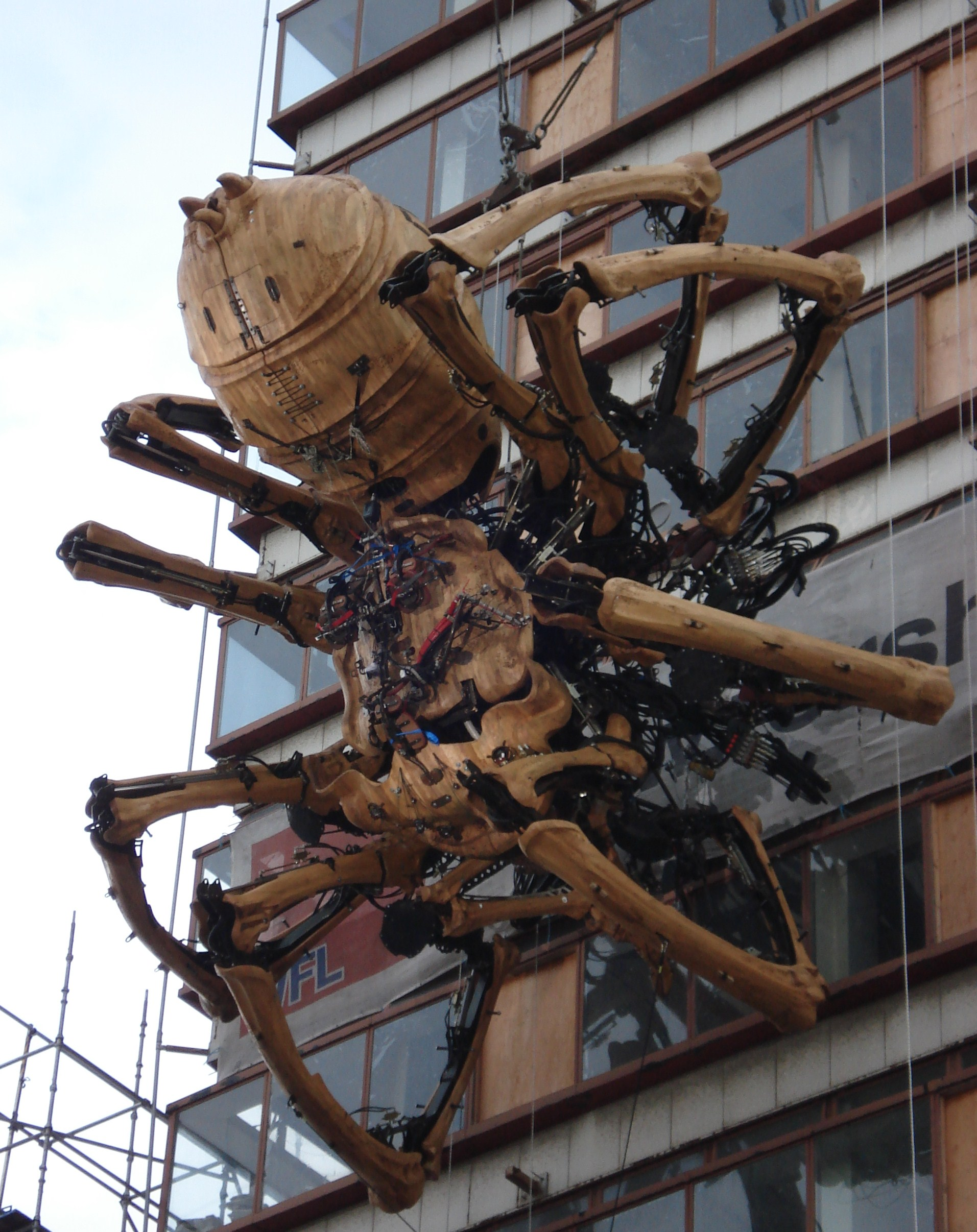
La Princesse roaming through Liverpool, England (September 2008)

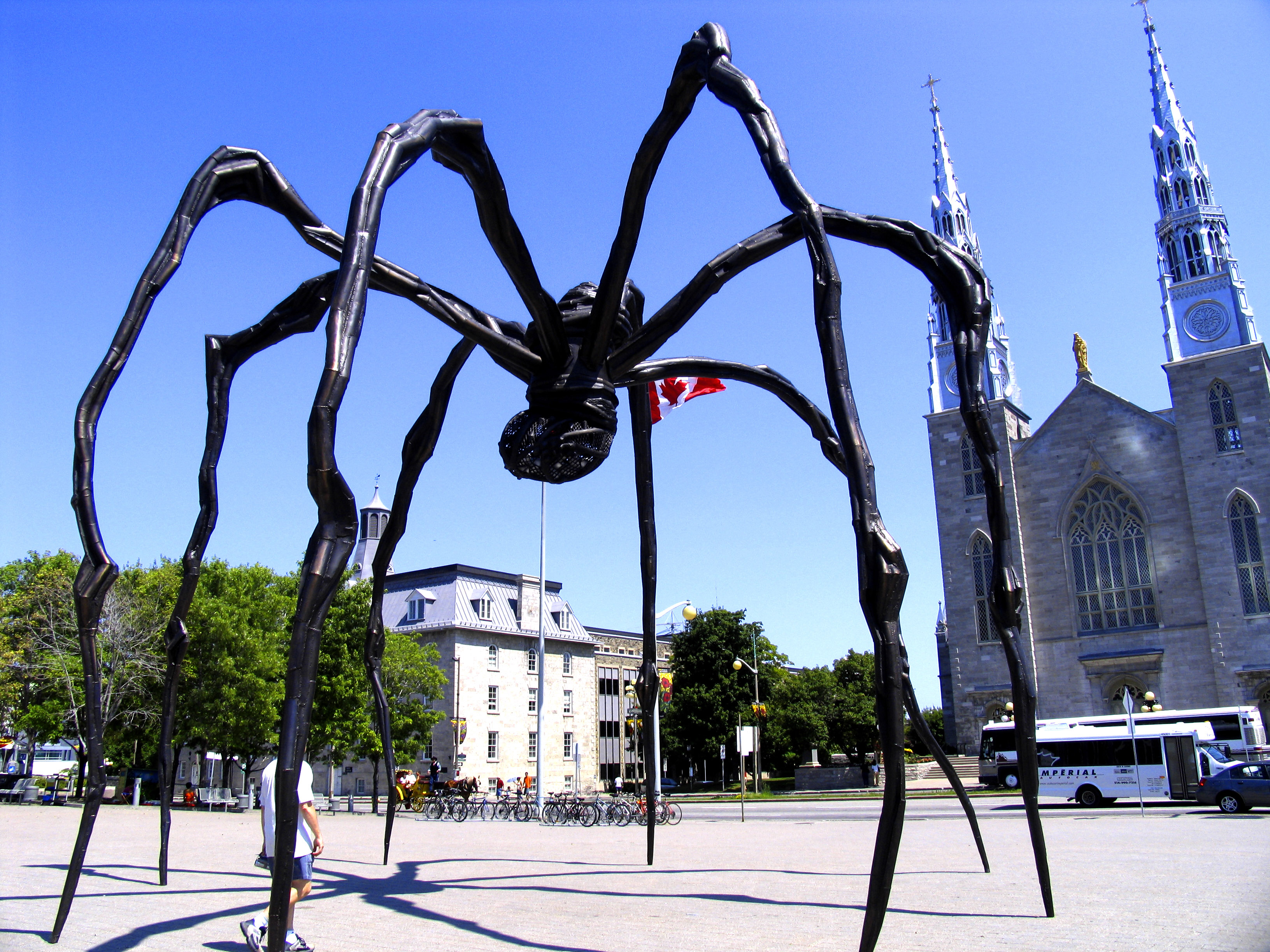
A bronze Maman outside the National Gallery of Canada, Ottawa

Giant spider sculptures (11 feet tall and 22 feet across) described as "looming and powerful protectresses, yet are nurturing, delicate, and vulnerable" and a "favorite with children" have been found in Washington DC, Denver CO, and elsewhere. Even larger sculptures are found in places like Ottawa and Zürich. These sculptures, two series of six by Louise Bourgeois, can be seen at the National Gallery of Art, Denver Art Museum, London's Tate Modern and in a few other select sculpture gardens. The larger series is titled Maman and the other simply titled Spider. One Spider was sold at a Christie's auction house for over $10 million.

A four-day performance art spectacle in Liverpool (September 2008) featured La Princesse by the French performance art company La Machine. This giant steampunk spider climbed walls, stalked the streets and sprayed unwary citizens while in search of a nest.

== Modern myths and urban legends ==
The widespread urban legend that a person swallows a high number of spiders during sleep in one's life has no basis in reality. A sleeping person causes noises and vibrations, such as breathing, snoring, and heartbeat, which warn spiders of danger. Also, it is typical for people to wake up from sleep when they have a spider on their face.

Huntsman spiders are large and swift, often eliciting arachnophobic reactions from susceptible people, and are the subject of many superstitions, exaggerations and myths. The banana spider myth claims that the Huntsman spider lays its eggs in banana flower blossoms, resulting in spiders inside the tip of bananas waiting to terrorize an unsuspecting consumer. This is supposed to explain why monkeys allegedly peel bananas from the "wrong" end.

According to another urban legend, daddy long-legs spiders (Pholcidae) have potent venom, but their fangs are too short to deliver the poison. This myth might have arisen due to their similarity to the brown recluse spider. In a 2004 episode of Discovery Channel's MythBusters, it was shown that host Adam Savage baits and survives a bite from a daddy long-legs.

A modern myth depicts a young woman who discovered that her beehive hairdo was infested with black widow spiders.

The Spider Bite legend emerged in Europe in the late 1970s. In most versions of this tale, a young vacationing female sunbather is bitten on the cheek by a spider. After seeking medical attention for the resultant swelling, hundreds of tiny spiders are discovered emerging from her lanced wound, which causes the victim to go insane.

An email hoax describes attacks by the "South American Blush Spider" in public toilets. The alleged spider's scientific name is Arachnius gluteus, where "arachnius" is a made-up word intended to mean "spider" (Note: From the common root arachno- in compound words, from Greek ἀράχνη, arachnē; the Latin word for "spider" is "aranea" (plural: Araneae), a name for an order, not a genus.) and "gluteus" is a reference to buttocks (cf: gluteus maximus). The hoax spider shares some characteristics with the two-striped telamonia (Telamonia dimidiata), and there is an updated version of the hoax using that name for the spider's species, with the rest of the text left unchanged, except for details such as locations. This hoax began in 1999 and has since spread to social media where it continues to circulate.

== See also ==
- Arthropods in culture
- Cobweb painting
- Dreamcatcher — Native American cultural object, styled after a spider's web
- Las Hilanderas (Velázquez) — Baroque painting, c. 1657; (a.k.a. The Fable of Arachne)
- "The Spider's Thread" — 1918 short story by Ryūnosuke Akutagawa
- "Legend of the Christmas Spider" — Eastern European folk tale
- "The Redback on the Toilet Seat" — Australian country music novelty song by Slim Newton
- Spiders Georg — internet meme
