= Gizo (mythology) =

Spider trickster present in the religion of the Hausa people

Gizo, also known as Gizzo, is a spider trickster figure present in the traditional religion of the Hausa people, who are situated in the Sahelian regions and are in large numbers in Nigeria, Niger, Ivory Coast, and Benin. Like many cultural depictions of spiders in African mythology, Gizo is a mythic hero.

== Representation ==
According to anthropologist Arthur John Newman Tremearne, Gizzo is considered the most prominent heroic figure in Hausa traditions. Like many other mythical African spiders, Gizzo is described as cunning and almost always outwits the other characters in Hausa folktales. Tremaine also noted that in Hausa culture, before a narrator told a fable, they will invoke the name of Gizzo beforehand.

== Legends ==
=== The Elephant, The Hippopotamus, and The Spider ===
A famine broke out once, and Gizo, as well as his family, was very hungry. So, Gizo went to the elephant, who is considered the master of all lands. Gizo said to the elephant, saying that the master of water, the hippopotamus, wanted the elephant to send him a hundred baskets of grain. As an exchange, the hippopotamus will send a great horse to the elephant. The elephant did not know that Gizo was lying, so she gave him the grains.

After succeeding in his first attempt, Gizo went to the hippopotamus this time. He asked for a hundred baskets of fish on behalf of the elephant. In return, the elephant would receive a great horse from the hippopotamus. Of course, Gizo was also lying to the hippopotamus - but she was none the wiser.

Eventually, both the hippopotamus and the elephant asked for their horses to Gizo. So, Gizo devised a trick: He told two village chiefs that a wild horse needed to be captured. All they had to do was pull on a piece of rope that Gizo put on their hands. Unknown to them, Gizo also claimed the same thing to the hippopotamus and the elephant; and thus, the three parties ended up tugging the rope towards each other’s directions, not knowing what happened.

Of course, in the end, both the hippopotamus and the elephant discovered the treachery. Gizo ran away and hid from their combined wrath. Once again, however, his hunger got the best of him, and he left his hiding place. To make sure that he won’t be recognized, Gizo took the skin of the antelope and pretended to be one. And he succeeded: Though both the elephant and the hippopotamus encountered him, neither managed to identify him.

== See also ==
- Anansi
- List of African mythological figures
