= The Spiderwick Chronicles =

Series of children's books

- Cover of The Spiderwick Chronicles Boxed Set, 2009
- The Spiderwick Chronicles: The Field Guide (2003); The Seeing Stone (2003); Lucinda's Secret (2003); The Ironwood Tree (2004); The Wrath of Mulgarath (2004); Beyond the Spiderwick Chronicles: The Nixie's Song (2007); A Giant Problem (2008); The Wyrm King (2009)
- Author: Holly Black; Tony DiTerlizzi
- Country: United States
- Language: English
- Genre: Children's literature; Fantasy
- Publisher: Simon & Schuster
- Published: May 1, 2003 – September 7, 2004 (The Spiderwick Chronicles); September 18, 2007 – September 8, 2009 (Beyond the Spiderwick Chronicles)
- Media type: Print (hardback and paperback)

The Spiderwick Chronicles is a series of children's fantasy books by Tony DiTerlizzi and Holly Black. They chronicle the adventures of the Grace children, twins Simon and Jared and their older sister Mallory, after they move into the Spiderwick Estate and discover a world of fairies that they never knew existed. The first book, The Field Guide, was published in 2003 and then followed by The Seeing Stone (2003), Lucinda's Secret (2003), The Ironwood Tree (2004), and The Wrath of Mulgarath (2004). Several companion books have been published including Arthur Spiderwick's Field Guide to the Fantastical World Around You (2005), Notebook for Fantastical Observations (2005), and Care and Feeding of Sprites (2006). A second series, entitled Beyond the Spiderwick Chronicles, includes The Nixie's Song (2007), A Giant Problem (2008), and The Wyrm King (2009).

A feature film adaptation, also titled The Spiderwick Chronicles, was produced by Nickelodeon Movies and premiered on February 14, 2008; an accompanying video game was released in early February 2008.

== Books ==
=== The Spiderwick Chronicles ===
==== The Field Guide ====
The first book in the series was published in May 2003. It opens in Maine, where nine-year-old identical twins Jared and Simon and their thirteen-year-old sister Mallory move into the decrepit Spiderwick Estate with their mother, Helen. On the first night, they discover a secret library on the second floor using a dumbwaiter. They later discover that the library connects to the rest of the house via a hidden door in a hall closet. A brownie named Thimbletack, who has lived in the house for years, becomes angry with the Grace children when they destroy his nest inside the walls, and Jared is blamed for the ensuing havoc wrought by the brownie in retaliation including assaults on Mallory, Simon, and the trashing of the kitchen. Following a clue in the form of a riddle-poem, Jared finds Arthur Spiderwick's Field Guide to the Fantastical World Around You in a secret compartment in a trunk in the attic. The Field Guide is an old hand-written and illustrated book with information on different types of faeries in the surrounding forest. The novel ends as the Grace children make amends with Thimbletack by building him a new home out of an old birdhouse. Thimbletack then warns them that the book which they found is dangerous and was not meant to be in the hands of mortals.

==== The Seeing Stone ====
The Seeing Stone was published alongside the first book in May 2003. After the Grace children ignore Thimbletack's warning to destroy the Guide, Simon is abducted by a group of goblins who live in the woods surrounding the house. Thimbletack leads Jared and Mallory to the old carriage house where they find a "seeing stone" (a stone with a natural hole in it) which gives the wearer, in this case Jared, the ability to see faeries (called the Sight). After Jared and Mallory narrowly avoid being captured by the goblins, they go searching for Simon in the woods. On their way through the forest, they encounter a troll residing in the river by a decrepit stone bridge. Partially protected by the daylight, they are able to avoid it, but lose their fencing weapons. Then they find a single brown shoe belonging to Simon. After encountering a wounded griffin, they find the goblin camp and a plethora of prisoners hanging in cages made from refuse from the trees. While trying to rescue Simon, they meet a prisoner named Hogsqueal, a hobgoblin, who convinces them to help him escape in exchange for his help in rescuing Simon. Hogsqueal offers to spit in their eyes, which gives them the Sight without using the stone. Hogsqueal distracts the goblins from the children's escape and in return, Jared, Simon and Mallory attract the goblins' attention away from Hogsqueal and then flee, leading the goblins back to the troll. Jared convinces the troll to let them escape in return for leading the goblins to him to eat. After they arrive home, Simon convinces them to return to the now empty camp to release the rest of the goblins' victims and they take the injured griffin to the carriage house. After getting grounded by their scared and angry mother for worrying her and coming home late, they discover that Thimbletack, enraged at Jared's forceful taking of the seeing stone, has again become a Boggart and reverted to his mischievous ways.

==== Lucinda's Secret ====
Lucinda's Secret was published on October 1, 2003. The novel opens upon an argument among the Grace children on whether or not to destroy the Field Guide, Jared alone insisting that they keep it. They eventually agree to consult their Great-Aunt Lucinda, who is now staying in a psychiatric hospital and is the only person whom they know to have been in contact with Arthur Spiderwick, who was her father. When they ask her about Arthur, it is revealed that the last time she saw him was one day when she was a little girl, on which Arthur had set out from the house on foot and never returned. She is horrified that the Grace family is staying at the Estate, which she says is not safe, and even more worried when she hears that they have the Guide, believing her father to have taken it with him when he disappeared. Lucinda warns the children that they have to get out of the house with the guide. However, when Jared takes the book from his backpack to show her, it has been replaced with another book by Thimbletack. Once home, the Grace children decide to find out what happened to their great-great uncle, and set out from the Estate with a map of the area on which is written "September 14th. Five O'clock. Bring the remains of the book." On their journey they meet a Phooka: a creature that talks only in riddles. They finally reach a river grove inhabited by elves, who threaten to trap one of the children there unless the guide is given to them. The children flee, however, promising to bring the Guide as soon as they can. On passing by the Phooka again, one of his riddles leads them to think that Arthur is still alive, but imprisoned in Faerie with the elves.

==== The Ironwood Tree ====
Published on April 6, 2004. The family attends Mallory's fencing match at school. During the tournament, Jared finds a boy identical to him going through Mallory's bag. He transforms into a smaller child when Jared attempts to scare him with his pocket knife. When Jared and Simon discover that Mallory has disappeared, they search for her in an abandoned quarry, but wind up being kept prisoner by dwarves. Mallory is revealed to be sleeping in a glass-coffin dressed in medieval garb (similarly to Snow White), with the dwarves saying she is now immortal, so long as she stays in the coffin. Escaping their cage, the twins free Mallory and meet a strange creature, called a knocker, who tells them the way out by listening to the stones. They next see a huge metal tree, made by the dwarves, called the Ironwood Tree. After a narrow escape from the dwarves' mechanical dogs, they make their way out of the tunnel but have to hide before leaving. They secretly watch Mulgarath, a shapeshifting ogre who wants to rule the world, callously orders the death of the dwarves for having been tricked into not getting the Field Guide from Jared. The dwarves are mauled to death by the goblins and Mulgarath reveals that he had the Guide the whole time. The siblings escape just after Mulgarath leaves with his goblins and the weapons made by the dwarves.

==== The Wrath of Mulgarath ====
The Wrath of Mulgarath was published on September 7, 2004. The Grace children return from the quarry to the Spiderwick estate, only to find the house in ruins and their mother gone. Hogsqueal the hobgoblin informs them that the house was destroyed by the goblins who have kidnapped their mother and taken her to the palace of their fearsome master, Mulgarath the ogre. Accompanied by Hogsqueal, the siblings journey to Mulgarath's palace, an immense citadel made of garbage where they battle a legion of goblins. Mallory runs the leader through with her sword and is greatly traumatized by having actually killed a living sentient being. Nevertheless, she and her brothers defeat the goblins and discover Mulgarath's plan. The ogre has learned from the Field Guide that fresh cows' milk makes young dragons rapidly mature. He has stolen a number of cows and is using them to breed an army of dragons with which he plans to conquer the world. Byron, the griffin, successfully vanquishes the mother dragon and Simon kills the young ones. Infiltrating the palace, they find their mother and father held captive. They release their parents, but discover that their father is actually Mulgarath in disguise. Jared has Thimbletack wrap chains around Simon and Mallory to save them. The ogre brags of his plan and reveals that the Field Guide is underneath his throne, and Jared mockingly tells Mulgarath that he and his siblings have killed all the dragons. In a rage, Mulgarath flings Simon and Mallory out of the window but Thimbletack's chains hold, and they don't fall far. Jared stabs Mulgarath in the foot with Mallory's sword, then knocks him out of the window. Mulgarath falls and transforms into a swallow to escape, but is snatched and eaten by Hogsqueal.

The children return home, where Jared and his mother reconcile. Although Jared is expelled from school, he and Simon are enrolled in a private school. The Grace family meets Arthur Spiderwick, who had been living with the elves and so had not aged. He and his daughter Lucinda, now an elderly woman, share a poignant goodbye, and he turns to dust. With Mulgarath defeated, the Grace family is now free to live happily ever after.

=== Beyond the Spiderwick Chronicles ===
==== The Nixie's Song ====
This story takes place in Florida, where 11-year-old Nick Vargas lives with his brother, Jules, his weird stepsister, Laurie, his father, Paul, and his stepmother, Charlene, in his father's housing development. Laurie has read the Spiderwick Chronicles and believes in faeries. Nick thinks she is "lame" and wishes she would leave him alone. After finding a four-leafed clover (which allows people to see faeries) he sees a nixie unconscious in his yard, which he and Laurie carry into a nearby artificial pond.

On the following day, the Nixie, named Taloa, gives Nick and Laurie the Sight and sends them to find her six sisters, who were separated when their pond was destroyed. They leave after a faerie fills Nick's father's car with sand to look for Taloa's sisters at her old pond. They find the pond dried, the surrounding forest burnt and the bodies of three of the nixies, accidentally waking up a giant, which they mistook for a hill. They flee from the giant, who becomes hypnotized and calm when it hears Taloa's singing.

The children decide to ask the authors of The Spiderwick Chronicles themselves for advice at a book signing, convincing Jules to drive them. Upon arrival, the protagonists seek assistance from authors Tony DiTerlizzi and Holly Black, who dismiss their accounts. However, they subsequently encounter Jared and Simon Grace, who agree to assist them in gathering necessary information. Jared tells them about a giant expert who lived nearby and they plan to meet at his address. The place appears to be deserted, and after a quick incident with Will-O'-the-Wisps, the kids take several papers including a diagram of a giant trap. While the giant is hypnotized by the nixie's song, the three kids use a rope to tie the giant's foot to its neck. It thrashes around, strangling itself with the cords, leaving the kids horrified at what they've done. When the giant stops moving, an old man called Noseeum Jack ("Noseeum" due to his poor eyesight, and "Jack" being a reference to the story of Jack the Giant-Killer) approaches, revealing to be the son of the giant expert who met Arthur Spiderwick, and a giant slayer himself, killing the giant definitely. He explains that the giants sleep for 500 years at a time and all wake up at once, bringing panic and destruction to anywhere they go, and that soon all of Florida's giants would be waking up.

==== A Giant Problem ====
Nick and Laurie start taking giant hunting lessons from Noseeum Jack, which Nick finds pointless. One night, Jack shows up at their house when their parents are fighting and takes them to see a fight between two giants who had woken up too close to each other. He approaches one of them when it gets injured and is swatted away, hurting his leg. The kids help him to his house and, once home, Laurie gives Jules a keychain containing the four-leafed clover (which they no longer need, having been given permanent Sight by Taloa).

The next day they find a small faerie (who Nick has seen days before) playing with a message that Taloa had left for them, saying she had gone to look for her surviving sisters alone. They catch the little faerie, whom Laurie names Sandspur and assumes to be a hobgoblin, based on the Field Guide. Later that day, two giants start fighting near their house. They escape with Jules, who can see the giants, but most of the development is destroyed. They go to Jack's house for help, but instead meet Jack's son (simply called Jack Junior), who tells them that he's taking his father to live with him and his wife. Noseeum Jack apologizes to Nick for not helping them and tells him he kept something for them in his backyard, which Nick doesn't even bother to investigate.

That night, the family stays at a hotel where they try to come up with a plan and Jules shows Sandspur to his girlfriend, Cindy. Based on the story of the Pied Piper of Hamelin, Nick thinks about the possibility of asking the merfolk to lure the giants to the sea, since they seem to be hypnotized by a nixie's singing. The kids sneak out to the beach, where they find that the mermaids hate land-dwellers and kidnap Jules, promising to let him go and sing the giants to the sea if the kids bring them a fish that has never been in their sea. They steal a tropical fish from Cindy's father's aquarium and race back to the beach. The mermaids are amazed that they completed the task and return Jules. Keeping their promise but intending to trick the humans, the mermaids sing for only a little while and to no effect before disappearing. However, Nick manages to tape their song in a tape recorder, which they intend to use to lure the giants themselves.

After getting Nick's model Viking ship from the hotel, they drive around a route provided by Sandspur of where the giants are, playing the mermaids' song. The giants follow the sound to the sea, where Nick drops the little boat (with the tape recorder) into the ocean. The giants follow it out to sea and the kids go back to the hotel where they find the Grace kids waiting for them with the news that the giants woke up all at the same time because they were there to kill something even worse.

==== The Wyrm King ====
The last book of the Spiderwick Saga, the story starts with the Vargas family going to a family therapist because of the children's latest strange behavior, which Nick's father thinks is caused by his remarrying. Meanwhile, sinkholes have been appearing everywhere throughout Florida, where small black serpent-like creatures are vaguely seen by Nick. Under the assumption that these sinkholes are caused by the creatures that the giants were supposed to destroy, the Vargas kids (plus Sandspur) meet up with Jared, Simon and Mallory at Noseeum Jack's house, which is now deserted and has a massive sinkhole in the front yard. After breaking into the house, they find more of Jack's annotations, which compare the hydra, shown as a group of intertwined wyrm dragons, to the legend of the Rat King.

Finally going to Jack's backyard, Nick and Laurie find what Jack had meant to give them: a small pool filled with lime and muck with Taloa and two of her sisters, Ooki and Ibi, whom Jack had captured some days earlier. Meanwhile, Mallory goes into the sinkhole to investigate, but finds herself unable to breathe and surrounded by the small snake-like dragons. They manage to get her out and put three of the creatures in a jar. They figure that the creatures produce methane, which makes the air around them unbreathable, and realize that these were the creatures that the giants ate to breathe fire (which they originally believed to be salamanders).

Seeing how fast the dragons can grow after feeding them a chunk of pizza, the children all drive to the beach to get the giants back to land so they can kill the dragons. The three nixies eventually agree to use their singing to lure the giants, and one of them is taken to the water with Nick and Jared in a surfboard (since nixies are used to freshwater, salt water hurts their skin). Before they can accomplish this, however, Nick is taken underwater by the merfolk, who tell him how they're glad that the land-dwellers are doomed and give him a magical cap in the process that allows him to breathe underwater. The nixies manage to get some of the giants to follow them to land, where they immediately start eating the small reptiles and fighting each other again. As the children drive away from the giants, their car falls into a sinkhole and only after some time do they manage to get out. A giant then attacks them, being saved by the showing up of Jack Junior, who suddenly decided to listen to his father and come help the children kill the giants (being surprised when they reveal him that killing giants is no longer their plan).

After dropping the nixies in a nearby pond (their reward for having sung to the giants), Jules, Laurie and Nick pass by Cindy's house and notice a large sinkhole close to it. When they go to warn Cindy and her parents, Laurie and Sandspur fall into the growing sinkhole and a tree falls on Jules's legs when attempting to rescue her. When Nick tries to help Laurie get out of the sinkhole, he finds that she still hadn't died from the methane exhaled by the dragons because Sandspur (who had grown to a huge size, revealing himself to be a spriggan) had been eating them, proceeding to eat Nick whole and only regurgitating him when Laurie drops rocks into the creature's mouth to make him sick. Nick and Laurie get out of the sinkhole and go back to meet Jack Jr. and the Grace kids, leaving Jules at Cindy's house waiting for an ambulance (being followed back by Sandspur, back in his small size, like nothing had happened).

Noticing that all sinkholes are connected, they come to the conclusion that the biggest hydra must be in the center, laying the eggs that hatch into the smaller hydras who wander through the tunnels. They notice that the giants are all going to meet that alpha hydra, and Jack Junior leaves to go kill it, followed by the children. There, they meet the giant multi-headed dragon, who had already started to kill the giants that had gathered to fight it. After hurting Jack Junior and the Grace kids, Nick has an idea and realizes it's up to him to save the day. Using the cap given to him by the merfolk so he could safely breathe, he goes into one of the tunnels with Jack's machete so to meet the hydra from below. When he gets there, instead of trying to kill the beast, he cuts the substance that keeps all the dragons together, thus making them separate from each other and easier for the giants to kill.

At the hospital, all the children get their injuries treated, Jules gets back with Cindy, Jack calls his father to tell him what happened, the Grace kids meet their father there and the Vargas family decides to all stay together. The Spiderwick Saga ends with the Vargas family going home, being watched by a silent giant in the distance.

=== Accompanying books ===
- Arthur Spiderwick's Notebook for Fantastical Observations. June 2005.
- Arthur Spiderwick's Field Guide to the Fantastical World Around You. November 2005.
- The Spiderwick Chronicles: Care and Feeding of Sprites. December 26, 2006.
- The Chronicles of Spiderwick: A Grand Tour of the Enchanted World, Navigated by Thimbletack. November 13, 2007.

== Characters ==
=== Humans ===
==== The Spiderwick Chronicles ====
- Jared Evan Grace: The protagonist and a nine-year-old boy. Jared is a brave and resourceful natural leader, shown to be good at creating plans. Due to his parents' divorce, Jared has trouble controlling his anger and is prone to flashes of violence that he later regrets. While at the beginning of the story he shows no hobbies or particular interests like Simon's love for animals and Mallory's fencing, he shows evidence of wanting to keep records of his experiences with faeries, making additional notes in Arthur's Field Guide and practicing his drawing, and is revealed to know a great deal about faerie lore in "Beyond the Spiderwick Chronicles".
- Simon Grace: Jared's identical twin brother. At first Simon seems to be the near opposite of his brother. He keeps a tidy appearance, is said to enjoy reading, and loves collecting and caring for animals, particularly ones that he's rescued (his two pet mice had been caught in a trap in their apartment complex in New York). His other pets include cats, goldfish and eventually a griffin (Jared calls them Simon's "menagerie"). However, he also is shown to succumb to flashes of anger, particularly when defending a person or animal in a helpless state, twice in the story going out of his way to save the life of the griffin Byron, with no thought of his own safety.
- Mallory Grace: Jared and Simon's 13-year-old sister and the story's heroine. She is an avid fencer who takes nearly every opportunity to practice, sometimes enlisting the help of an unfortunate brother. This skill comes in handy when defending herself against goblins in The Seeing Stone. She enters her brothers' adventures in the faerie world slightly reluctantly at first, but acts in later books as the occasional single-word-of-caution, and is quick to accept Jared's superior knowledge of the faerie world. She dislikes being caught unawares and "being bossed-around by faeries", and often lets herself show her deep affection for her siblings despite herself.
- Arthur Spiderwick: The author of Arthur Spiderwick's Field Guide to the Fantastical World Around You. He worked as a publicity artist and spent many years researching faeries by doing field work and by contacting other researchers (for example, for his entries on dragons and giants). His Field Guide eventually made him be seen as a threat by the elves, who ordered him to destroy it and imprisoned him for 80 years when he refused. Much like the Irish hero Oisín, who spent hundreds of years in the faerie world, Spiderwick also dies when he steps on the ground after being kept alive for more years than he was supposed to live.
- Lucinda Spiderwick: The daughter of Arthur Spiderwick and the cousin of Helen Grace's mother, making her the Grace children's great aunt. She was abandoned by her father after he was kidnapped by the elves, never knowing where he'd gone and being raised by the Grace children's grandmother. In adulthood, she was attacked by Mulgarath's army and subsequently put in a clinic for the insane. Because she tasted the food of the faeries, she can no longer eat regular food, only being kept alive by the fruits given to her by the sprites she played with as a child.
- Helen Grace: The mother of Jared, Simon, and Mallory, who is overprotective of them. She is strict at times, which stems from the pain of her divorce, but she can also be caring.
- Richard Grace: Helen Grace's ex-husband and the neglectful father of the Grace children.

==== Beyond the Spiderwick Chronicles ====
- Nicholas Vargas: The main character, who has "stopped bothering" since his mother died and doesn't get along well with anyone. Like Jared, he also shows skills in outwitting the faeries and tricking them just as they trick humans. He's said not to be good at sports, but is able to kill a giant and the Wyrm King almost by himself.
- Laurie Vargas: Nick's step sister, who truly believes in faeries, and first introduced Nick to the idea through a published copy of the Field Guide. She is disappointed when she finds that the faerie world is actually more dangerous and more real than she thought.
- Noseeum Jack: An old giant hunter (named after Jack the Giant Killer) and the son of a giant-expert friend of Arthur Spiderwick's. He had the Sight, but is now almost blind, going to live with his son and daughter-in-law after getting hurt by a fighting giant. He lived in an old house protected by will-o'-the-wisps, having captured Taloa and two of her sisters and keeping them in a swimming pool.
- Julian (Jules) Vargas: Nick's older "annoying brother", who spends all day surfing, stays out of his dad's way, and treats Nick like a kid. He eventually gets the Sight as well and helps the younger kids whenever driving is needed.
- Paul Vargas: Nick and Jules' dad, owns a housing development and doesn't understand his kids, having remarried probably too soon, in Nick's opinion.
- Charlene Vargas: Laurie's mom and stepmother of Nick and Jules, an "okay" person to Nick, although he wishes she wasn't around all the time. She suggests a break-up when the children start to act strange, but agrees to go back to Nick's dad in the end.
- Cindy: Jules' girlfriend who also likes surfing. She is friendly and helps the kids after Jules is kidnapped by the mermaids. She gets grounded after she helps Nick and Laurie steal a fish from her father's aquarium.

=== Faeries ===
In the Spiderwick universe, faeries usually remain invisible or disguised to human eyes, who are generally not aware of their presence. However, a small percentage of humans have the ability to see faeries, commonly called the 'Sight', acquired naturally (for example, by being the seventh son of a seventh son or having red hair) or artificially (by looking through a holed stone or possessing a four-leafed clover). In the series, the Grace children receive the Sight when the hobgoblin Hogsqueal spits in their eyes, and the Vargas kids receive it when they are held under the water that a nixie had been soaking in.

They are portrayed as living many years, so many of the faeries encountered by the main characters also met Arthur Spiderwick and other long-dead humans in the past, without having aged. The species of fairies in the series are mainly taken from European mythology and folklore and Medieval bestiaries, including brownies, goblins, dragons, sprites, and elves, among many others.

==== The Spiderwick Chronicles ====
- Thimbletack: The Spiderwick Estate's Brownie, a fairy who guards the Spiderwick mansion but, if angered, can become a vengeful and nasty boggart. Later in the series he ends up stealing the Field Guide and hiding it, believing this will be for the better. However, at the end of the books he is ultimately friendly and apparently becomes friends with Hogsqueal. He is able to make himself visible and invisible to humans at will, though only when he has to; saying, "Now you don't see us, now you do, but only when we want you to."
- Hogsqueal: One of Mulgarath's goblins who is actually a hobgoblin, the anti-hero of the story, changing sides depending on what fits his necessities at the moment. When Jared fails to kill Mulgarath, Hogsqueal saves the day by eating him while in swallow form, ending up staying with the children. Hogsqueal uses children's teeth as his own, claiming that he is the Tooth Faerie. He uses odd insults when addressing the children, Thimbletack and his own group of goblins, never calling anyone by their name. Tony DiTerlizzi reveals in his blog that Hogsqueal's first name was Horace in an early draft of Spiderwick, and that Hogsqueal is his favourite character in the series.
- Mulgarath: An evil, shapeshifting ogre who wants to take over the world by using the information in the Guide to find out the weaknesses of humans and the many faerie species. The main antagonist of the series, he lives in a palace made of garbage, keeping an army of goblins (led by a redcap named Wormrat and temporarily featuring Hogsqueal as a soldier), dragons, and dwarves (before having the latter ones killed). Mulgarath dies in The Wrath of Mulgarath, eaten by Hogsqueal after being tricked in to taking the form of a swallow, making his army scatter and his spells broken.
- Byron: A griffin saved by the children from Hogsqueal's gang of goblins, who were going to eat it. Simon took care of him and made him his pet. Resembling a hawks head with a lion's body, Byron often behaves like a cat, attempting to eat Hogsqueal and Mulgarath's dragons, and serving as a ride for the children and for Spiderwick.
- River Troll: A troll who appears in The Seeing Stone. He lives in a nearby river, underneath local bridges. A reference to the many dumb trolls of faery tales, Jared tricks him into letting him and his siblings live and to eat the goblins chasing them. He is probably the same troll who ate Arthur Spiderwick's infant brother.
- The Korting: The ruler of the dwarves. In The Ironwood Tree, he tricks Jared and Simon into being held prisoners, but keeps Mallory in a coffin to preserve her in time. He works for Mulgarath because the ogre had promised him they could rebuilt the world entirely in metal, making weapons for his army. After he gets the weapons, however, Mulgarath has his goblins kill all the dwarves.
- Dragons: Their shape is similar to that of a snakes, and they are as fast as a whip. Their species is named by Spiderwick as the "European wyrm". Despite being poisonous, all of Mulgarath's dragons are eaten by Byron, who was badly injured during the process.
- Goblins: Mischievous and grubby, goblins love smoke, fire, metal, a good bloodshed and a few tasty cats or dogs. Most species are born without teeth, so they make their own from such materials as glass shards, pieces of metal (except iron) and wood. Sometimes they use the teeth of other animals. They are unorganized and savage, only gathering themselves to an army (under the leadership of a redcap bull goblin named Wormrat) when Mulgarath takes power. After his death, the surviving goblins flee the area and go back to their small violent gangs.
- Elves: Elves act as the authority in the faerie territory of Spiderwick's Estate. They are shown as humanoid, a group of them living in the forest, making their clothes out of leaves. They have enough knowledge of magic to keep Spiderwick alive for nearly 100 years, they keep Stray Sods around their forest so humans cannot reach it, and they somehow employ Byron to take Spiderwick to his family.
- Phooka: On their way to the elves, the Grace kids find a phooka, a shapeshifter resembling a cross between a monkey and a black cat. It sits in a tree branch, talks in riddles and plays with its body shape in a way resembling the Cheshire Cat from Alice in Wonderland. Although he doesn't seem to be related to the elves nor to Mulgarath and his army, he seems to be aware of the destiny of Arthur Spiderwick and his nephews, giving them advice in riddles.
- Knocker: A strange creature who helps the children to find their way through the caves of the dwarves, in which it appears to live. It has batlike ears and a long finger similar to an aye-aye's, which it uses to tap stones, claiming that it can hear the stones speak.

==== Beyond the Spiderwick Chronicles ====
- Taloa: A nixie rescued by Nick and Laurie after her pond was destroyed by a fire-breathing giant. She gives them the Sight and demands that they find her lost sisters, eventually doing it herself and getting caught by Noseeum Jack. At the end, the Vargas kids keep their promise and deliver her and her two surviving sisters to a nearby pond.
- Sandspur: A small trash-eating with a fondness for sand and a pang of constant hunger, Sandspur is caught by Laurie and Nick and kept as a pet. Despite his first attempts to escape, he accepts Nick and Laurie and follows them around even after they try to get rid of him. Although Taloa calls him a "hob" in The Nixie's Song and Laurie calls him a hobgoblin in A Giant Problem, he is later identified by Laurie as a spriggan in The Wyrm King when his hunger makes him swell up. He is therefore the only creature in the books (other than the Wyrm King and the humanoid insects from The Nixie's Song) whose species is not mentioned in Arthur Spiderwick's Field Guide. Despite this under Goblins in the Field Guide, there is a Goblin with a bottle on its back just like Sandspur. In the end of the book, he apparently is also able to use glamour to make himself look like a cat.
- Giants: Hill giants are large humanoid creatures that can disguise themselves as small hills and mountains. They wake up all at the same time to control the hydra population by eating them to breathe fire, which they use to fight other giants. They are commonly attracted by the singing of nixies or mermaids.
- Mermaids: Stubborn, yet loyal and true to their word, mermaids have amazing voices that can hypnotize giants and humans. They are not easy to strike a deal with, as they frequently want something in return and usually take people as hostages to ensure the deal is kept. They seem to be able to do some magic as well, as they owned a cap able to make humans breathe underwater (similarly to the caps worn by merfolk in fairy tales to walk on the shore).
- The Wyrm King: Like the Rat King, the Wyrm King is a group of many wyrm dragons stuck together that devastate the land, creating sinkholes and millions of offspring. It is also compared to the Lernaean Hydra, the multi-headed snake from Greek mythology (ironically, the Wyrm King was killed by fire-breathing giants while the Lernaean Hydra was also killed with fire by Heracles and his nephew Iolaus).
- Ooki and Ibi: Two nixies, the only surviving sisters of Taloa, who get captured by Noseeum Jack with her and eventually make their home in a new pond. They both accept to help Nick after he swears his life to get them a home, convincing Taloa to help him as well.
- Manticores: Briefly seen by Nick in The Nixie's Song, a cougar-like creature with a barbed tail eating roadkill by the side of a road.
- Dragonfly-faeries: After receiving the sight from Taloa, Hugo, Jared and Simon saw these small dragonfly-like creatures while riding on their bike. Like spriggans and hydras, these faeries are not mentioned in the Field Guide, probably not being known by Arthur Spiderwick. However, they may just be a subspecies of the sprite. Their favorite drink is Pepsi.

== Writing ==
DiTerlizzi stated that, due to the collaborative effort he and Black put into the books, there is no individual credit as to who did the writing and who did the illustrations.

== Adaptations ==
=== Film ===
A feature film adaptation of the series was released by Paramount Pictures and Nickelodeon Movies on February 14, 2008. Directed by Mark Waters, it starred Freddie Highmore, Sarah Bolger, Martin Short, Nick Nolte, and Seth Rogen. It followed the basic overall plot of the five novels in the Spiderwick Chronicles series, but left out the majority of the plot from the fourth book and contained several major differences.

=== Television ===
On November 12, 2021, it was announced that a television adaptation was in development for Disney+. Production started in February 2022, with Kat Coiro joining as a director and executive-producer in May 2022; Coiro is set to helm the first two episodes. In August 2023, Deadline reported that the series was no longer moving forward at Disney+ despite having been already completed due to cost cutting reasons, it will be shopped to other networks. In October 2023, The Roku Channel had picked up the U.S. exclusive rights to the series, and released it in its entirety on April 19, 2024, consisting of eight episodes.
