= The Story of Diva and Flea =

- Book Cover
- Author: Mo Willems
- Illustrator: Tony DiTerlizzi
- Cover artist: DiTerlizzi
- Language: English
- Genre: Fiction, Children’s Literature, Friendship, Animals
- Publisher: Disney-Hyperion
- Publication date: October 1, 2015
- Publication place: United States
- English publication date: October 13, 2015
- Media type: Print (hardcover)
- Pages: 80
- ISBN: 9781484722848

The Story of Diva and Flea is a 2015 children's book written by Mo Willems and it is illustrated by Tony DiTerlizzi. It was first published by Hyperion Books for Children.

== Plot ==
A chapter book targeted to ages 6–8, the book is about a small house-loving dog and a large wandering cat who become friends in Paris. It is based on a real pair of animals that the author met in Paris.

== Reception ==
Publishers Weekly gave the book a positive review and noted it was "instantly fit for translation" to film, and a different PW column called it "a small modern classic". In a starred review, School Library Journal praised DiTerlizzi's illustrations. The Wall Street Journal compared it to the 1970 film The Aristocats. The New York Times called it a "lighthearted valentine to Paris".
