= Calling card (crime) =

Objects placed by a criminal to taunt or claim responsibility

A calling card from the Inter City Firm, left at the scene of football hooliganism.

In criminology, a calling card is a particular object sometimes left behind by a criminal at a scene of a crime, often as a way of taunting police or claiming responsibility. The name is derived from the cards that people used to leave when they went to visit someone's house and the resident was absent. A calling card can also be used as an individual's way of telling someone they are alive after they have run away or disappeared without revealing themselves or having direct contact with that person. It is often left at a bedside table while the person is asleep, at the living room floor and sometimes even at a graveyard if they know the times someone goes to visit their loved ones. However, some criminals choose not to leave a calling card, as it may be used by authorities or detectives to trace the criminal, and eventually arrest them.

== Historical examples ==
- Jack the Ripper is believed to have left two calling cards by Goulston Street, London on September 30, 1888, the night he murdered Elizabeth Stride and Catherine Eddowes: a scrap of Eddowes' apron and some graffiti reading Juwes are the men That Will not be Blamed for nothing. Some authors believe the graffiti may have already been there prior to the apron piece being dropped and that the two should not be linked.
- The 1968 Zodiac Killer in San Francisco would mail cryptograms to the San Francisco Chronicle made up of letters and zodiac signs, signed with a celtic cross.
- The Washington, D.C. Beltway sniper attacks in 2002 were linked by a series of Tarot cards left by the snipers, which contained messages for the policemen investigating the crimes.

== Examples in fiction ==
A spider is the calling card for the criminal gang in Fritz Lang's 1919 film, The Spiders

- In the 1919–1920 Fritz Lang adventure film series The Spiders a spider was the calling card for the criminal organization known as 'The Spiders'.
- In the 1905 West End play, the Scarlet Pimpernel leaves a calling card (a scarlet pimpernel) at each of his interventions.
