= Bauchan =

Creature in Scottish folklore

The bauchan (Scottish: bòcan English: bauchan, buckawn or bogan) is a type of domestic hobgoblin in Scottish folklore. It is often mischievous and sometimes dangerous, but is also very helpful when the need arises.

== Folklore ==
John Francis Campbell in his Popular Tales of the West Highlands tells the story of Callum Mor MacIntosh whose farm in Lochaber was haunted by a bauchan. The relationship between Callum and the bauchan was noted as being contradictory in nature. While the bauchan was belligerent and combative, he often provided assistance in various farm-related tasks. When Callum emigrated to New York City the bauchan went with him and helped him clear his new plot of land. In this tale the bauchan is a shapeshifter and is able to transform into a goat.

== Fiction ==
The character "Buckeye" is a bauchan in the fantasy novel The Haunted Wizard (1999) by Christopher Stasheff.

== See also ==
- Brownie
- Wild man
