= Tony DiTerlizzi =

American artist, writer and producer (born 1969)

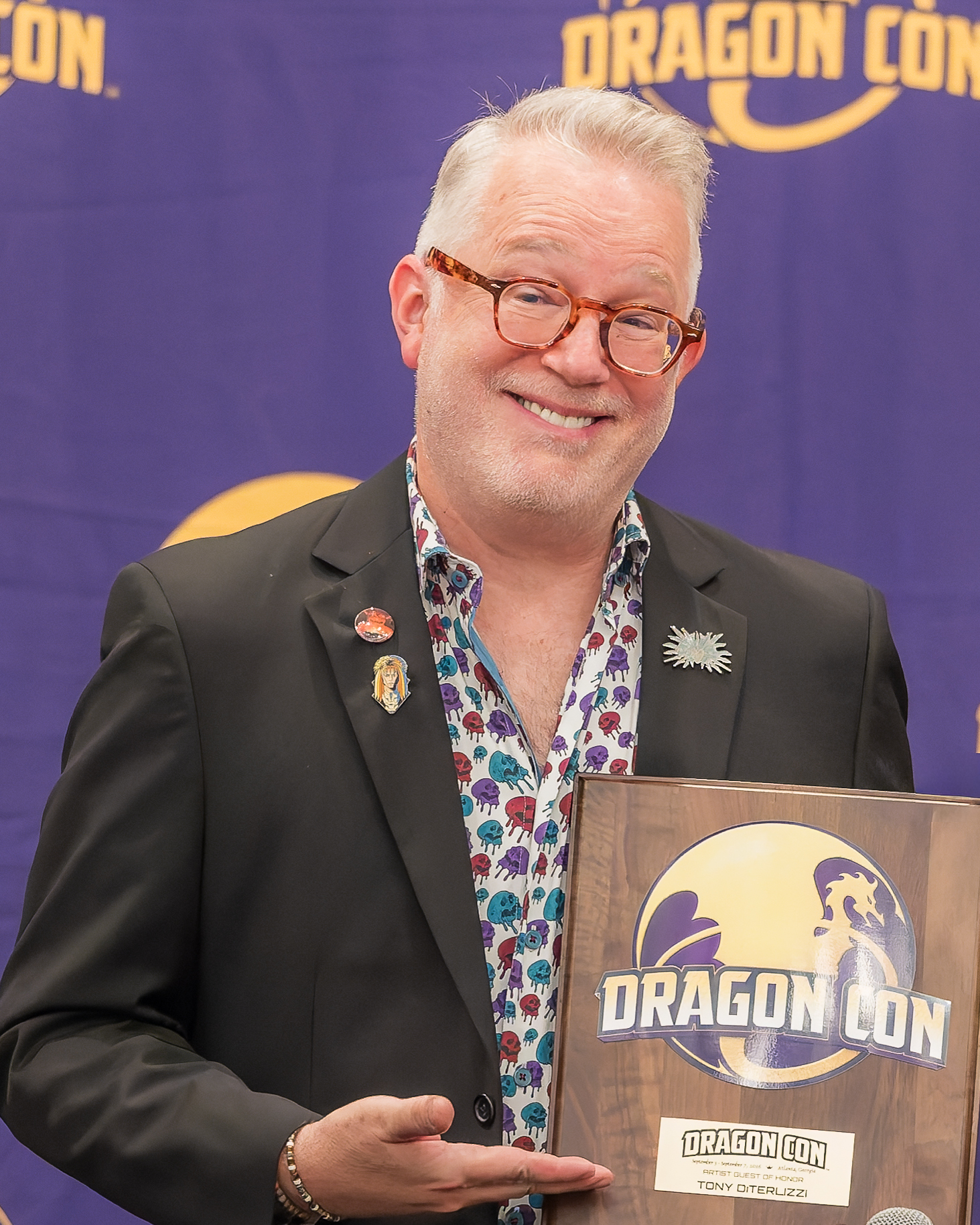
- DiTerlizzi at Dragon Con in 2026
- Born: Los Angeles, California, U.S.
- Occupations: Author, illustrator
- Spouse: Angela DiTerlizzi
- Writing career
- Notable awards: Caldecott Honor
- Website: diterlizzi.com

Signature
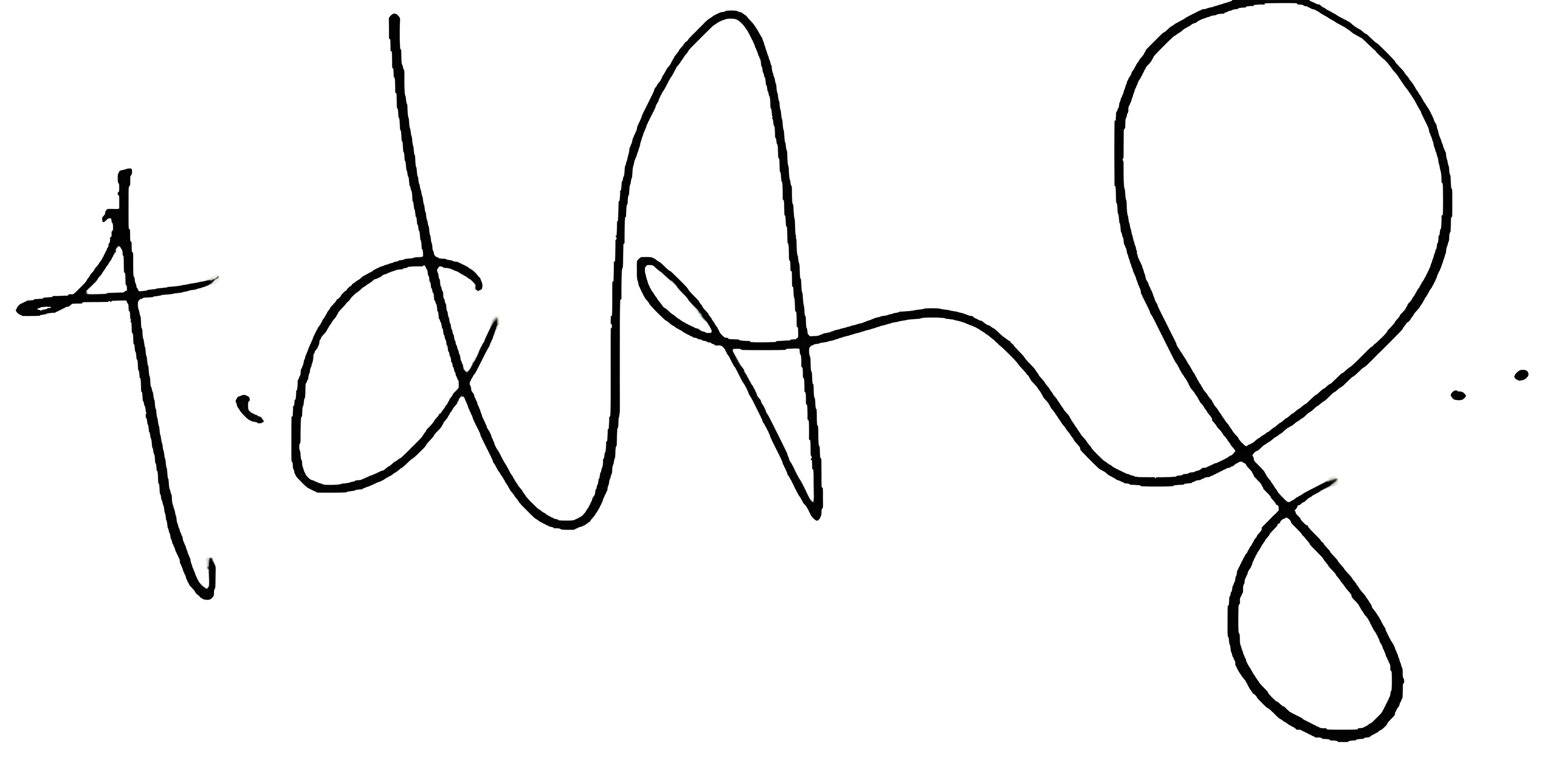

Tony M. DiTerlizzi is an American fantasy artist, children's book creator, and motion picture producer.

In the gaming industry, DiTerlizzi is best known for his work in the collectible card game Magic: The Gathering and on the Planescape product line for the Dungeons & Dragons role-playing game. He created The Spiderwick Chronicles series with Holly Black, and was an executive producer on the 2008 film adaptation of the series. In spring 2024, The Spiderwick Chronicles became a Roku TV series. DiTerlizzi won a Caldecott Honor for his adaptation of The Spider and the Fly. He is also the author of the bestselling sci-fi trilogy WondLa, launched on Apple TV in summer 2024.

== Early life ==
Tony DiTerlizzi was born in Los Angeles in 1969, the first of three children. The name DiTerlizzi means "from Terlizzi", a village in Italy's Apulia region. He grew up in South Florida where he attended South Fork High School. DiTerlizzi went to college at the Florida School of the Arts and The Art Institute of Fort Lauderdale, where he earned a graphic design degree in 1992.

== Career ==
Upon graduating, DiTerlizzi moved to New York with his wife Angela and began a freelance illustration career working for TSR's Dungeons & Dragons role-playing game. "I was so psyched when I got a chance to work on [the 1993 Monstrous Manual tome]. My entire goal was to 'blow away' the other artists. It helped me in getting the job for the Planescape setting."

DiTerlizzi worked on the 1994 Planescape Campaign Setting and its supplements, redesigning the look of the Outer Planes, "Not only buildings but the people had to have a rusted, organic look. This seemed to come naturally in my art style. When I went to work on Planescape, I looked at anime and Japanese fantasy art like Yoshitaka Amano." According to Shannon Appelcline, the artist's work was the backbone of the setting.

DiTerlizzi continued to work for TSR, as well as White Wolf Publishing's Changeling and Werewolf Storyteller games, and illustrated many cards for Magic, Blood Wars and Rage.

DiTerlizzi also illustrated books such as 1997's Giant Bones by Peter Beagle, and 1998's Dinosaur Summer by Greg Bear. The first project where he both wrote and illustrated a book was the 2000 publication Jimmy Zangwow's Out-of-this-World Moon Pie Adventure, followed in 2001, by Ted, which received the 2002 Zena Sutherland Award.

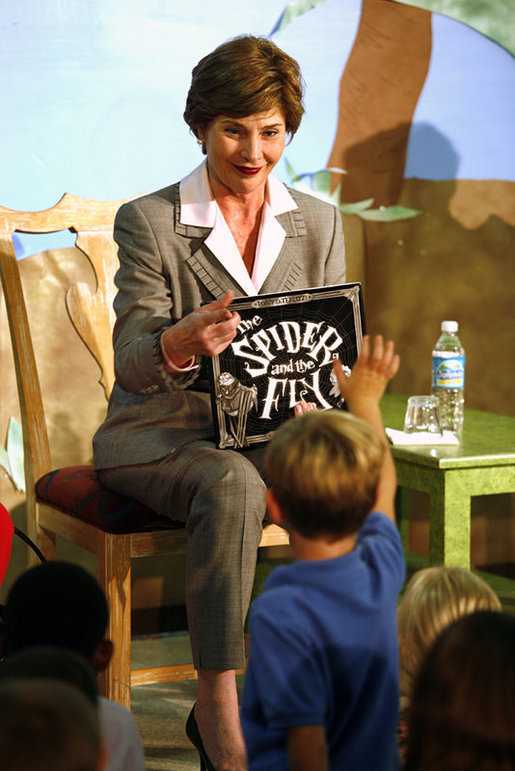
First Lady Laura Bush just after reading from the DiTerlizzi adaptation of The Spider and the Fly, 27 October 2006

Mary Howitt's classic poem The Spider and the Fly, which became a New York Times Best Seller, was his next project, and for which DiTerlizzi was awarded the 2003 Caldecott Honor Medal.

DiTerlizzi and Holly Black created The Spiderwick Chronicles, bought by Simon & Schuster Children's Publishing and Nickelodeon Movies in 2002 and published in 2003. It was subsequently translated into 30 different languages. In 2005, Arthur Spiderwick's Field Guide to the Fantastical World Around You was published, with Paramount Pictures releasing a live-action movie adaptation of the series, DiTerlizzi acting as co-executive producer.

A sequel series, Beyond the Spiderwick Chronicles, began publication in September 2007, and continued through 2009.

In 2010, Simon & Schuster published the first book of a trilogy, The Search for WondLa, written and illustrated by DiTerlizzi. A Hero for WondLa was published two years later, and The Battle for WondLa followed in 2014. The science fiction trilogy was inspired by classic books such as Alice's Adventures in Wonderland and The Wonderful Wizard of Oz and films such as Star Wars and Nausicaä of the Valley of the Wind. The WondLa trilogy was turned into an Apple TV+ animated series in June 2024.

Dark Horse Books published Realms: The Roleplaying Art of Tony DiTerlizzi in 2015, with words from DiTerlizzi and a collection of artwork and photographs spanning his early career. “Tony's work has a distinct flair, a love for monsters if you will . . . His creatures have the charm of Henson or Rackham but they carry with them hints of their own ecosystem . . . Tony stands alone as a world creator and a weaver of tales, may you treasure these art pieces as much as I do,” quoted Guillermo del Toro.

DiTerlizzi wrote and designed Star Wars: The Adventures of Luke Skywalker, Jedi Knight, published in 2014 by Disney Lucasfilm Press (an imprint of Disney Publishing Worldwide). Accompanying his words were illustrations by Ralph McQuarrie.

Author/illustrator Mo Willems partnered with DiTerlizzi to illustrate the book The Story of Diva and Flea, inspired by Willems' year living abroad in Paris. Disney-Hyperion published the New York Times bestselling book in 2015.

== Influences ==
DiTerlizzi cites a variety of artists including Norman Rockwell and Dr. Seuss as major creative influences. He stated: "Many good fantasy artists will tell you their influences are Frazetta or Boris Vallejo. Realizing this, I went for more diverse influences, since it seemed to me that most current fantasy work has that same oil-painted feel." DiTerlizzi was influenced by artists such as Hieronymus Bosch and Leonardo da Vinci to early 1900s magazine artists (Maxfield Parrish, Heinrich Kley) to classic children's book illustrators (Arthur Rackham, Ernest Shepard, John Tenniel) to offbeat modern fantasy artists (Brian Froud, Moebius, William Stout, Jim Henson). DiTerlizzi's artistic style has been described as "demented exuberance." Another inspiration was David Trampier, who illustrated much of AD&D's first Monster Manual, which DiTerlizzi recalled as his favorite book as a child: "I would copy Trampier's drawings over and over." DiTerlizzi was a fan of role-playing game art long before entering the field.

DiTerlizzi is also a fan of the work of Hans Christian Andersen, Charles Perrault and the Brothers Grimm. Illustrators such as Arthur Rackham, Edmund Dulac, Kay Nielsen, and Ernest Shepard all had an impact, as well as author/illustrators like Maurice Sendak, Shel Silverstein, and Richard Scarry.

== Reception ==
In DiTerlizzi's 2023 book Monsters, Aliens, and Holes in the Ground, RPG historian Stu Horvath reviewed the fantasy role-playing game Planescape and noted, "DiTerlizzi shifted the look of fantasy RPGs — no exaggeration. To this point, D&D (and therefore the rest of the fantasy-minded folks in the industry) were escalating a sort of clean tightly rendered, and classical realism. ... DiTerlizzi is entirely different. He goes back farther for his inspirations, to the golden age of illustrators ... Like all of those artists, his work has elements of realism, but also leaves plenty of space for the whimsy and emotion afforded to the cartoonish and strange. His loose watercolors wash over ink, subverting expectations and changing the way many players saw fantasy in their mind's eye."

== Personal life ==
DiTerlizzi lives and works in Amherst, Massachusetts with his wife, New York Times best-selling children's book author Angela DiTerlizzi, and their daughter, Sophia.

== Bibliography ==
=== Written and Illustrated ===
- Jimmy Zangwow's Out-of-This-World Moon-Pie Adventure, 2000
- Ted, 2001
- The Spiderwick Chronicles (co-created/written with Holly Black), 2003–2004
- Arthur Spiderwick's Field Guide to the Fantastical World Around You, 2005
- Care & Feeding of Sprites, 2006
- G Is for One Gzonk, 2006
- Beyond the Spiderwick Chronicles (co-created/written with Holly Black), 2007–2009
- Kenny & the Dragon, 2008
- Adventure of Meno! (co-created/written with Angela DiTerlizzi), 2009
- The Search for WondLa, 2010
- A Hero for WondLa, 2012
- The Battle for WondLa, 2014
- The Broken Ornament, 2018
- Kenny & the Book of Beasts, 2020

=== Illustrations ===
- Dinosaur Summer, 1998
- Ribbiting Tales, 2000
- Alien & Possum: Friends No Matter What, 2001
- Alien & Possum: Hanging Around, 2002
- The Spider and the Fly, 2002
- Dragonflight, 2002
- Peter Pan in Scarlet, 2005
- The Story of Diva and Flea, 2015
