= Hobgoblin =

Mischievous spirit

A hobgoblin is a household spirit, appearing in English folklore, once considered helpful, but which since the spread of Christianity has often been considered mischievous. Shakespeare identifies the character of Puck in his A Midsummer Night's Dream as a hobgoblin.

== Etymology ==
The term "hobgoblin" comes from "hob". (Note: A hob, is also flat metal shelf at the side or back of a fireplace, having its surface level with the top of the grate and used especially for heating pans, so a hobgoblin may simply refer to a household goblin, or a spirit that resides in this particular location in a household.) (Note: A "hobgoblin" is a variety of goblin, a "mischievous and ugly fairy". "Hob" was simply a friendly name for the countryside goblin, so named in a rustic tradition described by one etymologist as "a piece of rude familiarity to cover up uncertainty or fear". "Hob" is generally explained as a diminutive for "Robert", and here short for "Robin Goodfellow," but see also note.) The earliest known use of the word can be traced to about 1530, although it was likely in use for some time prior to that.

== Folklore ==
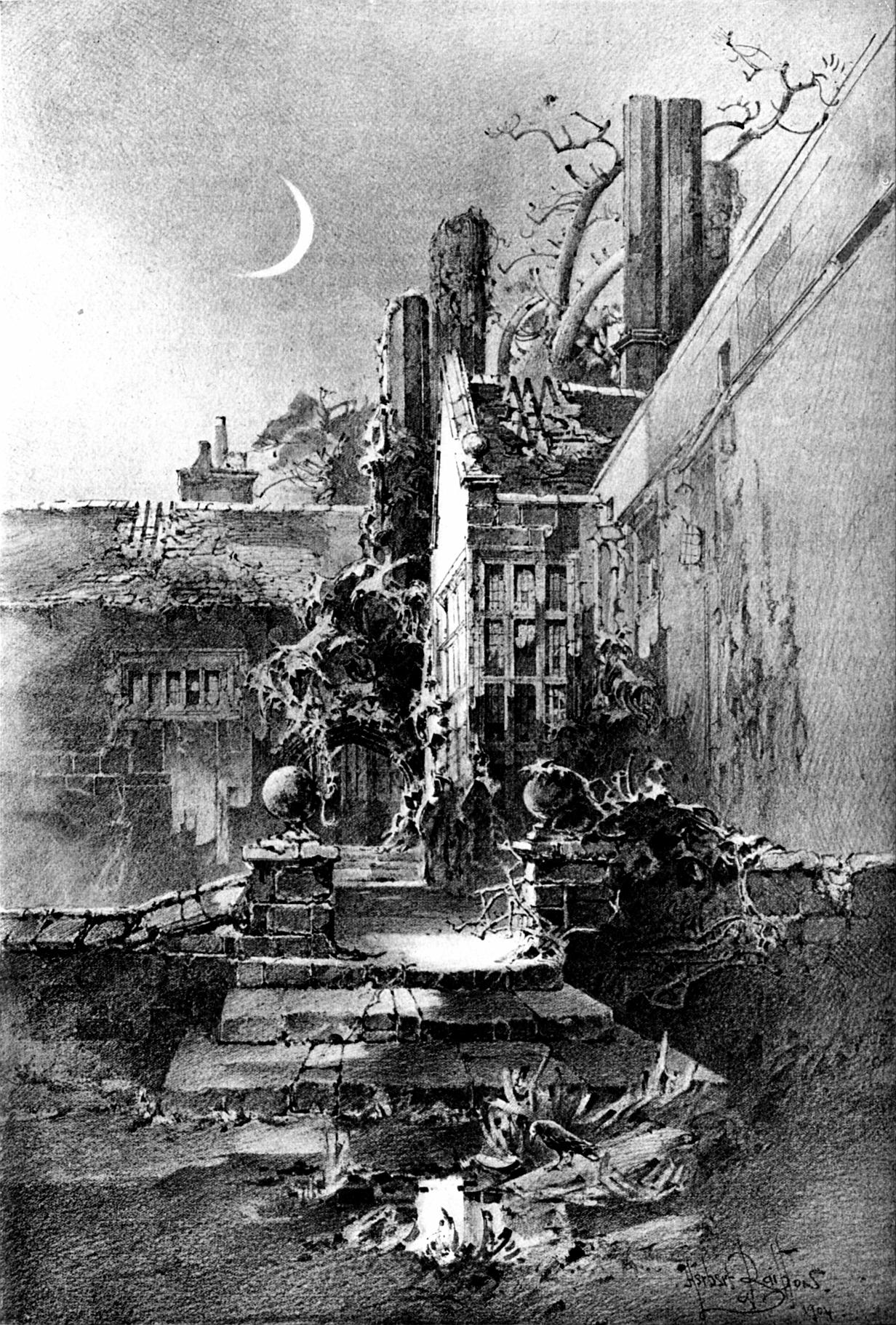
Hobgoblin Hall, a 1904 drawing by Herbert Railton of William Wordsworth's house, Rydal Mount

Hobgoblins seem to be small, hairy little men who, like their close relatives the brownies, are often found within human dwellings, doing odd jobs around the house while the family is asleep. Such chores are typically small tasks like dusting and ironing. Often, the only compensation necessary in return for these is food.

While brownies are more peaceful creatures, hobgoblins are more fond of practical jokes. They also seem to be able to shapeshift, as seen in one of Puck's monologues in A Midsummer Night's Dream. Robin Goodfellow is perhaps the most mischievous and most infamous of all his kind, but many are less antagonizing. Like other fairy folk, hobgoblins are easily annoyed. They can be mischievous, frightening, and even dangerous. Attempts to give them clothing will often banish them forever, though whether they are offended by such gifts or are simply too proud to work in new clothes differs from teller to teller.

Billy Blind
is a clever hobgoblin or brownie found in several ballads collected by F. J. Child. Billy Blind helps humans in dramatic situations by offering valuable information and advice.

Blue Burches
is the name of a shapeshifting hobgoblin who played harmless pranks in the home of a shoemaker and his family on the Blackdown Hills in Somerset. His usual form was that of an old man wearing baggy blue breeches but he also took the form of a white horse, a black pig and a wisp of blue smoke. The family took his presence in good stride but some clergymen learned of his existence and banished him from the house.

Robin Roundcap
(not to be confused with Robin Redcap) haunted Spaldington Hall in Spaldington, East Riding of Yorkshire, and was a hearth spirit of the true hobgoblin type. He helped thresh the corn and performed other domestic chores, but when he was in the mood for mischief he would mix the wheat and chaff again, kick over the milk pail, and extinguish the fire. He is said to have been confined in a well for a stipulated number of years through the prayers of three clergymen. This well is known as Robin Roundcap's Well.

Dobby
is another term for hobgoblin in Lancashire and Yorkshire according to the folklorist Elizabeth Mary Wright, especially one that is a relentless prankster. Much like the boggart, a dobby's pranks may become so troublesome that a family decides to move elsewhere, only to find that the dobby has followed them (one version of this tale involves Robin Roundcap). However, one Yorkshire dobby (or hob) lived in a cave and was noted for curing children of the whooping cough. Dobbies could be just as industrious as other hobgoblins and brownies, which led to the expression "Master Dobbs has been helping you" whenever a person has accomplished more work than was expected. The term is also referenced in the character of the house-elf Dobby in the Harry Potter series.

== Variants ==
The bauchan is a Scottish domestic hobgoblin that is mischievous and belligerent but also very helpful when the need arises.

The bwbach (or boobach, plural bwbachod) is a Welsh domestic hobgoblin that will perform household chores in return for bowls of cream. They are good-natured but mischievous and have a dislike of clergymen and teetotalers, upon whom they will play relentless pranks.

== Literature ==
In the poem "L'Allegro" (1645) by John Milton a domestic hobgoblin or brownie, known as a Lubbar Fend (or lubber fiend) and described as strong and hairy, threshes the corn then lies by the fireplace enjoying his bowl of cream that he earns as payment. In the earlier play The Knight of the Burning Pestle (1607) by Francis Beaumont, a similar being is known as Lob-Lie-by-the-Fire, described as a giant and the son of a witch. Folklorist K. M. Briggs stated that the two creatures are generally equated. Briggs's own fantasy novel, Hobberdy Dick (1955), is about a hobgoblin that lives in the home of a 17th century Puritan family.

In a 1684 hymn Bunyan couples the hobgoblin with "a foul fiend", as two monstrous beings who try (and fail) to "daunt the Pilgrim's spirit".

The term "hobgoblin" is used sometimes to mean a superficial object that is a source of (often imagined) fear or trouble. The best-known example of this usage is probably Ralph Waldo Emerson's line, "A foolish consistency is the hobgoblin of little minds", from the essay Self-Reliance.

Hobgoblins exist in the works of Tolkien as a larger kind of orc, though they are not prominently featured. In the preface of The Hobbit, he states that "Orc is not an English word. It occurs in one or two places but is usually translated goblin (or hobgoblin for the larger kinds)".

In The Spiderwick Chronicles, a hobgoblin (Note: The hobgoblin, named 'Hogsqueal', is a prominent character in the second and fifth books in the series, The Seeing Stone, and The Wrath of Mulgarath. In the books, Hogsqueal says that hobgoblins are born without teeth, so they often steal baby teeth from under children's pillows. In the film adaptation, which condenses the events of the series to one film, Hogsqueal is voiced by Seth Rogen.) is portrayed as a selfish character, always hungry, insulting to others, and annoyed with always being confused for a goblin.

== In popular culture ==
In Dungeons & Dragons, the name "hobgoblin" is used for a vaguely ape-faced humanoid species that live in militarized tribal societies or as leaders of goblin tribes.

Hobgoblin is the alias of several supervillains appearing in American comic books published by Marvel Comics, most of whom are depicted as enemies of Spider-Man.

== See also ==
- Goblin
- Bogeyman
- Dobby (Harry Potter)
- Hob (folklore)
- Household deity
- Kobold
- Niuli
