= Claudia Rowe =

Journalist working for The Seattle Times

Claudia Rowe is a journalist who currently works for The Seattle Times. In the past, she has worked for The New York Times, Mother Jones, Woman’s Day, The Huffington Post and The Stranger and other newspapers and magazines. She has been a member of the Humanities Washington Speakers Bureau.

== Awards ==
Rowe has won several journalism awards:

- She received the Casey Medal for Meritorious Journalism award in 2006, for "Judgment Calls: When to remove a child?", and won in 2008 for “One Fatal Shot”.
- She also received first place awards from the Society of Professional Journalists.
- She was given the Taylor Award from the Nieman Foundation for Journalism in 2009.
- In 2025, her book Wards of the State: The Long Shadow of American Foster Care was named as a finalist for the National Book Award for Nonfiction

== The Spider and the Fly ==
In 1998, Rowe was living in Poughkeepsie, New York, working for The New York Times. She was assigned to cover the murders by Kendall Francois, a serial killer who murdered at least eight women. Rowe spent five years talking with Kendall in a quest to understand what made him tick and why he committed such horrific crimes. The end result is The Spider and the Fly: A Reporter, a Serial Killer, and the Meaning of Murder, a book about Kendall, his effect upon her and how he helped her to overcome her own struggles. Published by Dey Street Books on January 24, 2017, the book is presented as "part psychological thriller and part gut-wrenching memoir." (Review from Robert Kolker.)
