= The Spider and the Fly (DiTerlizzi book) =

2002 picture book by Tony DiTerlizzi

- The cover art of The Spider and the Fly
- Author: Mary Howitt
- Illustrator: Tony DiTerlizzi
- Language: English
- Genre: Poem, children's books
- Publisher: Simon & Schuster Books for Young Readers
- Publication date: October 1, 2002
- Publication place: United States
- Media type: Print
- Pages: 18
- ISBN: 978-0-689-85289-3

The Spider and the Fly is a picture book published by Simon & Schuster Books for Young Readers on October 1, 2002. The author and illustrator, Tony DiTerlizzi, based this book on a poem by Mary Howitt originally written in 1829. The Spider and the Fly became a Caldecott Honor book in 2003.

== Description ==
The Spider and the Fly presents the 1829 poem of the same name, composed by Mary Howitt, as a picture book, illustrated by Tony DiTerlizzi. The book was published in 2002 by Simon & Schuster Books for Young Readers. The book contains 40 pages and is intended for children ages 5 and up. The plot is conveyed by a series of monochrome drawings, which set the events around the eponymous spider's home.

== Plot summary ==
The poem describes a spider's ultimately successful attempts to entice a fly into his home, apparently with an iniquitous motive. The Fly is constantly warned by the spirits of the Spider's previous victims, but she does not listen.

The Fly, initially hesitant, is eventually won over by flattery; "'Your eyes are like the diamond bright, but mine are dull as lead!'", and is eaten by the Spider.

== Characters and themes ==
As the title suggests, the main characters are a Spider and a Fly. The illustrator also incorporates as images ghosts of the Spider's past victims.

The book retains the original poem's function as a cautionary tale, warning the reader against vanity as a quality readily manipulable by others for nefarious purposes.

== Critical reception ==
The Spider and the Fly met with critical acclaim. Publishers Weekly praised it as a "a visual treat", and for its appeal to "young sophisticates and kids alike". The New York Times also approved, believing it able to "explicate the metaphor", yet not "diminish [young readers'] pleasure in the grisly doings one bit."

== Awards ==
- 2003 Caldecott Honor Book
