= The Spiderwick Chronicles (film) =

- Theatrical release poster
- Directed by: Mark Waters
- Screenplay by: Karey Kirkpatrick; David Berenbaum; John Sayles
- Based on: The Spiderwick Chronicles by: Tony DiTerlizzi; Holly Black
- Produced by: Mark Canton; Larry Franco; Ellen Goldsmith-Vein; Karey Kirkpatrick
- Starring: Freddie Highmore; Mary-Louise Parker; Nick Nolte; Joan Plowright; David Strathairn; Seth Rogen; Martin Short
- Cinematography: Caleb Deschanel
- Edited by: Michael Kahn
- Music by: James Horner
- Production companies: Nickelodeon Movies; The Kennedy/Marshall Company; Atmosphere Pictures
- Distributed by: Paramount Pictures
- Release dates: January 31, 2008 (Hollywood); February 14, 2008 (United States)
- Running time: 96 minutes
- Country: United States
- Language: English
- Budget: $90-92.5 million
- Box office: $162.8 million

The Spiderwick Chronicles is a 2008 American fantasy film directed by Mark Waters and written by Karey Kirkpatrick, David Berenbaum, and John Sayles, based on the book series by Tony DiTerlizzi and Holly Black. It stars Freddie Highmore, Mary-Louise Parker and Sarah Bolger, with Nick Nolte, Seth Rogen, and Martin Short in voice roles. The film, set in the Spiderwick Estate in New England, follows three children who discover a field guide to fairies while encountering various magical creatures such as goblins, ogres, brownies, boggarts, hobgoblins, trolls and many others.

The Spiderwick Chronicles was released on February 14, 2008, by Paramount Pictures and grossed $163 million against its $90–92.5 million budget. The film received generally positive reviews from critics.

== Plot ==
In 1928, Arthur Spiderwick writes a field guide about the many fairies he has encountered. After finishing the Book, he hides it away for fear of Mulgarath, a shapeshifting ogre who plans to use the Book's secrets for evil.

Eighty years later, recently divorced Helen Grace inherits and moves into the abandoned Spiderwick estate with her children, 13-year-old daughter Mallory and 9-year-old twin sons Jared and Simon. Jared is angry about the move and would rather live with his father in New York. After uncovering a hidden dumbwaiter, Jared discovers Arthur's study where he finds the Field Guide. When Jared explains his discovery of the Book and the existence of magical creatures, his family does not believe him. The next morning, Jared meets a brownie named Thimbletack, who is initially angry with Jared for having opened the book that he needed to protect from Mulgarath. Jared placates him with crackers and honey, and Thimbletack gives Jared a holed stone that allows Jared to see the normally invisible fairies by looking through it.

Thimbletack tells him about the protective mushroom circle surrounding the house. Jared witnesses Simon's abduction by goblins, led by Redcap. Simon is taken to the goblins' campsite where he is confronted by Mulgarath, disguised as an old man. Jared sneaks into the campsite where he meets Hogsqueal, a hobgoblin, who gives Jared the ability to see faeries without the stone by spitting in his eyes so he can help him get revenge on Mulgarath for killing his family. Mulgarath releases Simon so he can fetch the book for him. Jared finds Simon and both fight over the book before they are chased by the goblins. The twins flee back to the house, and Mallory fights them off with her fencing sabre.

The children decide to visit Arthur's daughter, their great-aunt Lucinda Spiderwick, for advice. While Simon distracts the goblins, Mallory and Jared escape through an underground tunnel. Chased by a mole troll sent by Redcap, they narrowly escape when it is struck and killed by an oncoming truck. Jared and Mallory meet the elderly Lucinda in the psychiatric hospital where she lives, surrounded by sprites. She tells the children that they need to find her father and have him destroy the book and that, for eighty years, Arthur has been held captive by the sylphs. At that moment, Redcap and his goblins attack them through the window and manage to tear off several pages from the book before being driven off. Among the stolen pages, Mulgarath is pleased to find information on how to break the protective circle and plans to create a potion in order to do so during the night of a full moon.

While Helen is driving home, she and Jared argue over her disbelief; Jared angrily tells Helen that he hates her and does not want to live with her anymore. Later, Hogsqueal, having overheard Mulgarath's plan, informs the children. When Jared tries and fails to contact his father again, Mallory tells him the truth: he's dating another woman and has moved in with her. Jared, Simon, and Mallory use the book to summon a griffin, which takes them to the sylphs' realm. There, they meet Arthur, who has not aged and is initially unaware of the time he has spent there. Jared asks him to destroy the book only to find out that Thimbletack had switched the pages and kept the real Book. Arthur is relieved until Jared tells him that Mulgarath knows how to break the protective circle. Arthur informs Jared that the sylphs will not allow them to leave as they, like him, know too much about the fairies and the fairies do not want them to reveal their existence to the world. Arthur helps them escape by distracting the sylphs with the fake book.

At home, the children finally convince Helen of the truth. Meanwhile, the goblins finish spreading their potion, which successfully breaks the circle as the full moon rises. The family defend themselves with kitchen knives and tomato sauce/salt bombs (ingredients deadly to goblins) and manage to kill the goblins in an explosion of tomato sauce. Suddenly, the children's father, Richard, appears; however, Jared, suspicious about his father's words and behavior, stabs him, revealing him to be Mulgarath in disguise. Mulgarath pursues Jared and the Book throughout the house before cornering him on the roof. Jared tosses the Book and Mulgarath transforms into a raven to catch it, but he is suddenly snatched and eaten by Hogsqueal. Afterwards, Jared and his mother reconcile. Jared refuses to live with his father again and decides to live with his mother instead.

Several weeks later, the family brings Lucinda to visit the house. The sylphs arrive with Arthur, allowing him to briefly visit now that the Book is safe. However, Arthur cannot stay long as he will turn to dust if he remains. Lucinda asks to go with him and is transformed back into a child. The Grace family watch as the sylphs spirit Arthur and Lucinda away, and they are now free to continue and live happily in their new home.

== Cast ==
- Freddie Highmore as the Grace twins
  - Jared Grace: The black sheep of the family, and the most reluctant about moving from New York.
  - Simon Grace: The pacifistic animal lover.
- Mary-Louise Parker as Helen Grace: the children's overprotective mother.
- Nick Nolte as Mulgarath, an evil shapeshifting ogre, the leader of the goblins.
- Sarah Bolger as Mallory Grace: Jared and Simon's firm and brave older sister.
- Andrew McCarthy as Richard Grace: the children's neglectful father.
  - McCarthy also portrays Mulgarath's disguise of Richard.
- Joan Plowright as Lucinda Spiderwick: the daughter of Arthur and Constance.
  - Jordy Benattar as Young Lucinda Spiderwick
- David Strathairn as Arthur Spiderwick: the author of the guide and former owner of the mansion.
- Lise Durocher-Viens as Constance Spiderwick: the wife of Arthur and mother of Lucinda
- Tod Fennell as Helen Grace's co-worker
- Mariah Inger as Nurse
- Jeremy Lavalley as Tow Truck Driver

Voice cast

- Seth Rogen as Hogsqueal: an unintelligent bird-eating hobgoblin who seeks revenge against Mulgarath for killing his family.
- Martin Short as Thimbletack: a loyal house brownie who shapeshifts into an aggressive boggart when he becomes angry.
- Ron Perlman as Redcap: Mulgarath's aggressive and loyal general of his goblin army – his role is uncredited.
- Ben Diskin, Bob Joles, Jonathan Lipow, John Mariano, Nolan North, Chris Parson, and Fred Tatasciore perform the goblin voices.

== Production ==
=== Filming ===
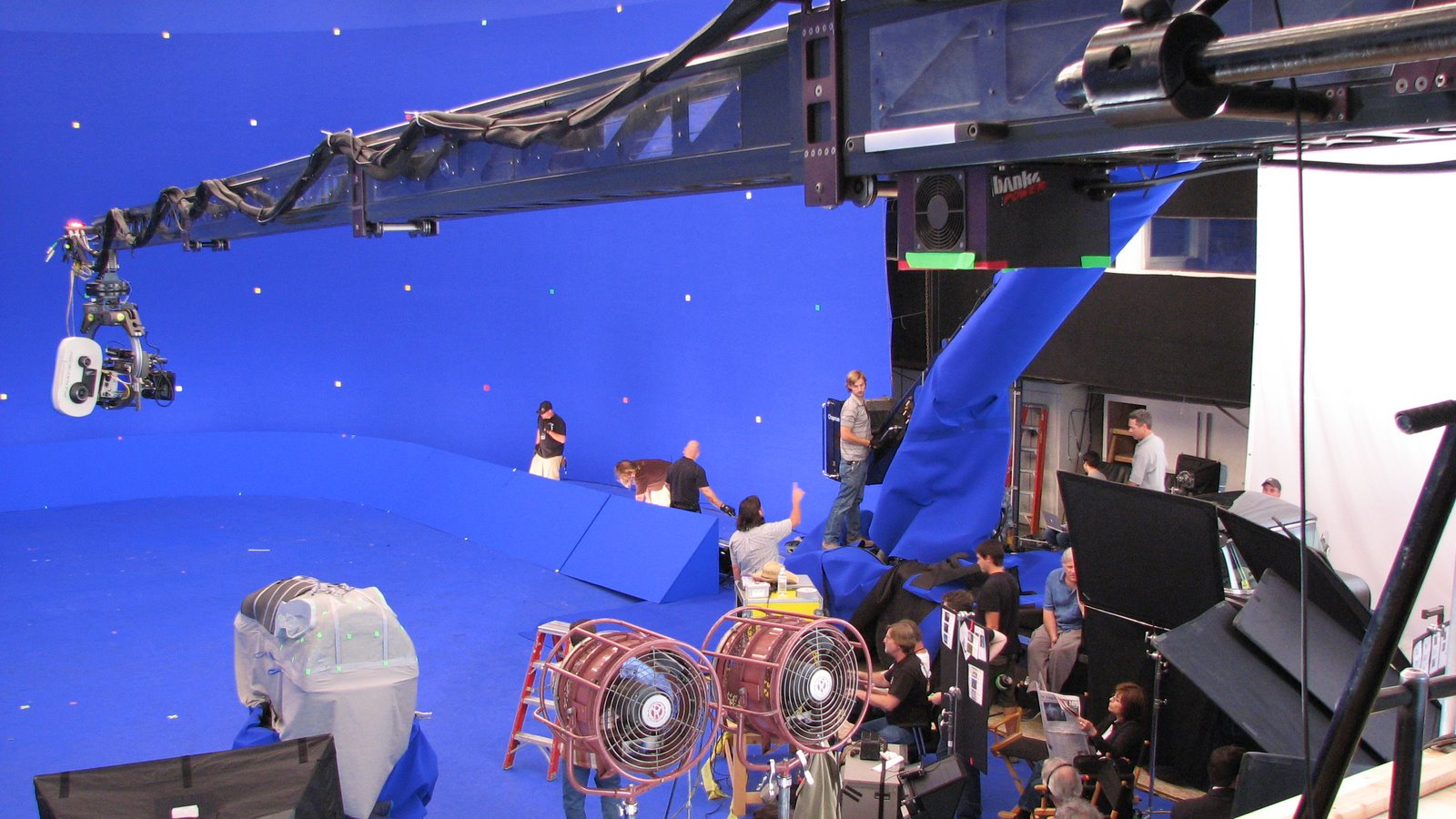
A blue screen set used during filming.

In an interview, Sarah Bolger said that filming took 4–5 months. She said that she "was [in front of] the blue screen like 24 hours a day", and for the most part, she was "kicking and slicing and chopping things that were nowhere near". Since Bolger had many fencing scenes, she had five weeks of intense training, and three hours with the Canadian Olympic fencing coach nearly every day.

== Reception ==
=== Critical response ===
On Rotten Tomatoes the film has an approval rating of 81% based on 149 reviews, with an average rating of 6.70/10. The site's critical consensus reads: "The Spiderwick Chronicles is an entertaining children's adventure, with heart and imagination to spare." On Metacritic the film has an average score of 62 out of 100, based on 30 reviews. Audiences surveyed by CinemaScore gave the film a grade "A−" on scale of A to F.

Critics called it "decent entertainment," "a work of both modest enchantment and enchanting modesty," and "modest and reasonably charming." It was criticized for its reliance on special effects; A. O. Scott of The New York Times said that the movie "feels more like a sloppy, secondhand pander" and called it "frantic with incident and hectic with computer-generated effects," and another said that "the sense of wonder and magic is lost in the shuffle." Despite some negative reviews for the film overall, Highmore was generally praised for his dual role as the twins Simon and Jared. One critic said that he "skillfully portrays two distinctive personas," another said he "[had] no trouble grasping the task at hand," and a third remarked that, "the most special effect is probably Highmore".

Roger Ebert gave it three and half stars on four and said: "The Spiderwick Chronicles is a terrific entertainment for the whole family, except those below a certain age, who are likely to be scared out of their wits. What is that age? I dunno; they're your kids. But I do know the PG classification is insane, especially considering what happens right after a father says he loves his son. This is a PG-13 movie, for sure. But what will cause nightmares for younger kids will delight older ones, since The Spiderwick Chronicles is a well-crafted family thriller that is truly scary and doesn't wimp out."

The film was nominated by the Visual Effects Society in the category of "Outstanding Animated Character in a Live Action Feature Motion Picture" but it lost to The Curious Case of Benjamin Button, another film from Paramount Pictures. The film was also nominated for two Saturn Awards for Best Fantasy Film and Freddie Highmore for Best Performance by a Younger Actor.

=== Box office ===
In its opening weekend, the film grossed an estimated $19 million in 3,847 theaters in the United States and Canada, ranking #2 behind Jumper at the box office. With the opening day's gross on Thursday included, the film grossed an estimated $24.3 million on its opening weekend. It has grossed $162.8 million worldwide.

== Home media ==
The film was released on DVD and Blu-ray on June 24, 2008, in the United States. It was re-released on DVD and Blu-ray on September 12, 2017, in the United States.

== Television series ==
On November 12, 2021, Disney announced that a series would be filmed and released on Disney+. It was produced by 20th Television with partnership from Paramount Television Studios. The series is not co-produced by Nickelodeon due to it being produced by 20th Television and Paramount only. It is also not related to the film. In August 2023, it was announced that the already completed series would no longer be airing on Disney+ due to cost cutting reasons, but it would be shopped to other studios. In October 2023, Roku announced that it had picked up the series and released it in its entirety on April 19, 2024, on The Roku Channel, consisting of eight episodes.

== Video game ==
Vivendi Games, under their Sierra Entertainment label enlisted Stormfront Studios to develop and produce a video game adaptation of The Spiderwick Chronicles, following the general storyline of the books and film. It was released, shortly before the film's opening, on February 5, 2008, for Nintendo DS, Wii, PC, Xbox 360, and PlayStation 2, and rated Everyone (E10+) by the ESRB.

== See also ==
- List of films featuring home invasions
- Jumanji
