= The Spider and the Fly (Rowe book) =

2017 book by Claudia Rowe

- Author: Claudia Rowe
- Language: English
- Genre: Non-fiction
- Publisher: Dey Street Books
- Publication date: January 24, 2017
- Publication place: United States
- ISBN: 9780062416124

The Spider and the Fly was published on January 24, 2017, by Dey Street Books and was written by Claudia Rowe. It chronicles interviews between Rowe and serial killer Kendall Francois also known as "The Poughkeepsie Killer" and "Stinky."

While working for The New York Times, Rowe was assigned to cover the murders of eight women by Francois and interviewed him for five years during which she experienced a strange bond with the killer and eventually conquered her own struggles. The book is part memoir and part psychological thriller.
