= The Spiders (film) =

1920 film directed by Fritz Lang

The Spiders (Die Spinnen)
- Poster for part 1
- Directed by: Fritz Lang
- Written by: Fritz Lang
- Produced by: Erich Pommer
- Starring: Carl de Vogt; Ressel Orla; Georg John; Lil Dagover
- Cinematography: Carl Hoffmann; Emil Schünemann (part 1); Karl Freund (part 2)
- Production companies: Decla-Film-Ges. Holz & Co.
- Distributed by: Decla-Bioscop AG
- Release dates: 3 October 1919 (Part 1); 6 February 1920 (Part 2)
- Running time: 137 minutes 140 minutes (TCM)
- Country: Weimar Republic
- Languages: Silent film German intertitles

The Spiders - Episode 1, The Golden Sea (1919) by Fritz Lang

The Spiders - Episode 2, The Diamond Ship (1920)

The Spiders (German: Die Spinnen) is a silent two-part German adventure film written and directed by Fritz Lang. It was released in two parts in 1919 and 1920. Two more parts were originally planned but never made. It was believed to be a lost film, but it has been rediscovered and restored.

== Plot ==
Carl de Vogt and Lil Dagover in a scene from part 1

Part 1. Der goldene See ("The Golden Lake"):

In San Francisco, well-known sportsman, adventurer and traveller Kay Hoog announces to his club that he has found a message in a bottle with a map drawn by a Harvard professor who has gone missing. The message tells of a lost Incan civilization that possesses an immense treasure. Hoog starts an expedition to find the treasure, while the crime syndicate "Die Spinnen" sends out a rival expedition led by the beautiful but dangerous Lio Sha. At the Golden Lake, Hoog saves the Inca priestess Naela and falls in love with her. He takes her home with him after discovering a mysterious clue about a diamond ship. Back in San Francisco, Lio Sha declares her love for Hoog but he rejects her in favour of Naela. Lio Sha has Naela murdered and Kay Hoog swears revenge.

Part 2. Das Brillantenschiff ("The Diamond Ship"):

The search is on for a Buddha-head shaped diamond that has special powers. Carried in the hands of 'a princess' it will bestow the power to rule Asia. In San Francisco, Hoog discovers a hidden city underneath Chinatown but he is found out and taken prisoner. Eventually the hunt brings Kay Hoog to England, where the Spiders kidnap Ellen, daughter of diamond king Terry whom they suspect of owning the stone. When Kay Hoog arrives on the scene, he and Terry discover (with the help of an ancient log book) that Terry's pirate ancestor concealed a map in a painting. Hoog follows the map to the Falkland Islands to find the diamond, but Fourfinger-John, who has spied on Terry and Hoog, manages to inform the Spiders by carrier pigeon. Lio Sha and her henchmen catch up with Hoog in the cave where the pirate treasure is hidden and take him prisoner. However, poisonous fumes from a volcano enter the cave and all the criminals die. Only Kay Hoog manages to escape with the stone. Back in England, he works with the police and Terry to free Ellen from the clutches of the Spiders' hypnotist master.

== Cast ==
Part 1

- Carl de Vogt as Kay Hoog
- Lil Dagover as Sun Priestess Naela
- Ressel Orla as Lio Sha
- Georg John as Dr. Telphas
- Rudolf Lettinger as diamond king John Terry
- Edgar Pauly as Fourfinger-John
- Paul Morgan as diamond expert
- Meinhardt Maur as book worm
- Friedrich Kühne

Part 2

- Carl de Vogt as Kay Hoog
- Ressel Orla as Lio Sha
- Reiner Steiner as captain of the diamond ship
- Georg John as Dr. Telphas
- Rudolf Lettinger as diamond king John Terry
- Thea Zander as Ellen Terry
- Friedrich Kühne as Yogi All-hab-mah
- Edgar Pauly as Fourfinger-John
- Meinhardt Maur as Chinese
- Paul Morgan as Jew

== Production ==
Fritz Lang was early in his directorial career when he accepted an assignment to direct what was to be a mystery-action film series composed of four feature-length episodes. Lang was forced by this assignment to relinquish the directorial duties of The Cabinet of Dr. Caligari, which was also released by the distributor Decla-Bioscop AG in 1919.

Filming took place for Part 1 from June to August 1919 in Hamburg at Tierpark Hagenbeck. Part 2 was shot October to December 1919 in Hamburg (Tierpark Hagenbeck and others) and at the Weissensee Studios in Berlin.

Lang completed two episodes before the project was cut short by the films’ producer. Part 1 was released as The Golden Lake (Die Spinnen, 1. Teil: Der Goldene See) and part two as The Diamond Ship (Die Spinnen, 2. Teil: Das Brillantenschiff). Part 1 premiered on 3 October 1919 at the Richard-Oswald-Lichtspiele in Berlin, Max Josef Bojakowski was the conductor. Part 2 premiered on 6 February 1920 at Theater am Moritzplatz, Berlin.

Planned, but not produced (working titles):

Part 3. Um Asiens Kaiserkrone ("For Asia's Imperial Crown")
Part 4. Im Spinnennetz ("In the Spider's Web")

== Restoration ==
The two completed films of The Spiders series were considered to be lost films for many years before the original prints were discovered in the 1970s. The surviving prints were used for restoration, completed in 1978. The restored versions appear to be missing a small amount of the original footage. This was released on DVD in 1999 and Blu-ray in 2016.

The three-year reconstruction was done by film historians David and Kimberly Shepard, with music scored by Gaylord Carter. The source material was a 35mm duplicate negative from Czechoslovakia; the nitrate print had several defects that could not be removed, was out of sequence and lacked intertitles. The intertitles were obtained from German censor records. The films were tinted according to instructions from Fritz Lang, who was still living at the time.

== See also ==
- List of rediscovered films
- In film and television section of Cultural depictions of spiders
