= The Spider and the Fly (song) =

- 1975 French picture sleeve (reverse)

Single by the Rolling Stones
- A-side: "(I Can't Get No) Satisfaction" (UK)
- Released: 30 July 1965 (US Out of Our Heads album); 20 August 1965 (UK single)
- Recorded: 13 May 1965
- Studio: RCA, Hollywood
- Genre: Blues; Blues rock
- Length: 3:38
- Label: London; Decca
- Songwriter: Jagger/Richards
- Producer: Andrew Loog Oldham

"The Spider and the Fly" is a song by English rock band the Rolling Stones, recorded in May 1965 and first released on the US version of their 1965 album Out of Our Heads. In the UK, it was released as the B-side to "(I Can't Get No) Satisfaction". In 1971, the song was released on an album for the first time in the UK on the Decca Records compilation Stone Age.

The song was written by Mick Jagger and Keith Richards. The title takes its name from the 1829 poem by Mary Howitt. The lyrics speak about what the band, especially the leader, will do after their gig is over:

Sittin' thinkin' sinkin' drinkin'
Wondering what I'll do when I'm through tonight
Smokin', mopin', maybe just hopin'
Some little girl will pass on by

Jagger explained in a 1995 interview with Rolling Stone, "I wasn't really that mad about it, but when you listen to it on record, it still holds up quite interestingly as a blues song. It's a Jimmy Reed blues with British pop-group words, which is an interesting combination: a song somewhat stuck in a time warp." In an AllMusic review, Mike DeGagne describes it as one of their earliest attempts at country music.

The Stones have performed "The Spider and the Fly" live very rarely: they did so during two eras of their career, in 1965–1966 and once during the 1995 leg of their Voodoo Lounge Tour. A March 1995 studio reworking of the song was included on the Stones' album Stripped. For this version the age of the woman in the song was updated from thirty to fifty.

== Personnel ==
According to authors Philippe Margotin and Jean-Michel Guesdon:

- Mick Jagger – vocals, harmonica
- Keith Richards – lead guitar
- Brian Jones – rhythm guitar
- Bill Wyman – bass
- Charlie Watts – drums

== Notes ==
=== Sources ===
- Margotin, Philippe; Guesdon, Jean-Michel (2016). The Rolling Stones All the Songs: The Story Behind Every Track. New York: Black Dog & Leventhal Publishers. ISBN 978-0-316-31774-0.
