= The Spider and the Fly (poem) =

1829 poem by Mary Howitt

- by Mary Howitt
- Subject: Fable
- Genre(s): Children's, comedy
- Publication date: 1828

"The Spider and the Fly" is a poem by Mary Howitt (1799–1888), published in 1828. The first line of the poem is "'Will you walk into my parlour?' said the Spider to the Fly." The story tells of a cunning spider who entraps a fly into its web through the use of seduction and manipulation. The poem is a cautionary tale against those who use flattery and charm to disguise their true intentions.

The poem was published with the subtitle "A new Version of an old Story" in The New Year’s Gift and Juvenile Souvenir, which has a publication year of 1829 on its title page but, as the title would suggest, was released before New Year’s Day and was reviewed in magazines as early as October 1828.

The opening line is one of the most recognized and quoted first lines in all of English verse. Often misquoted as "Step into my parlour" or "Come into my parlour", it has become an aphorism, often used to indicate a false offer of help or friendship that is in fact a trap. The line has been used and parodied numerous times in various works of fiction.

When Lewis Carroll was rewriting Alice's Adventures Under Ground for publication as Alice's Adventures in Wonderland, he replaced a negro minstrel song with "The Mock Turtle's Song" (also known as the "Lobster Quadrille"), a parody of Howitt's poem that mimics the meter and rhyme scheme and parodies the first line, but not the subject matter, of the original.

This poem is often associated with gothic literature, exploring themes of seduction and manipulation. Howitt uses these themes combined with a child friendly allegory to portray predator vs prey.

== Text ==
I.
"Will you walk into my parlour?" said a spider to a fly;
"'Tis the prettiest little parlour that ever you did spy.
The way into my parlour is up a winding stair,
And I have many pretty things to shew when you are there."
"Oh no, no!" said the little fly, "to ask me is in vain,
For who goes up your winding stair can ne'er come down again."

II.
"I'm sure you must be weary, with soaring up so high,
Will you rest upon my little bed?" said the spider to the fly.
"There are pretty curtains drawn around, the sheets are fine and thin;
And if you like to rest awhile, I'll snugly tuck you in."
"Oh no, no!" said the little fly, "for I've often heard it said,
They never, never wake again, who sleep upon your bed!"

III.
Said the cunning spider to the fly, "Dear friend, what shall I do,
To prove the warm affection I've always felt for you?
I have, within my pantry, good store of all that's nice;
I'm sure you're very welcome – will you please to take a slice?"
"Oh no, no!" said the little fly, "kind sir, that cannot be,
I've heard what's in your pantry, and I do not wish to see."

IV.
"Sweet creature!" said the spider, "you're witty and you're wise.
How handsome are your gauzy wings, how brilliant are your eyes!
I have a little looking-glass upon my parlour shelf,
If you'll step in one moment, dear, you shall behold yourself."
"I thank you, gentle sir," she said, "for what you're pleased to say,
And bidding you good morning now, I'll call another day."

V.
The spider turned him round about, and went into his den,
For well he knew, the silly fly would soon come back again:
So he wove a subtle web, in a little corner, sly,
And set his table ready, to dine upon the fly.
Then he went out to his door again, and merrily did sing,
"Come hither, hither, pretty fly, with the pearl and silver wing;
Your robes are green and purple – there's a crest upon your head;
Your eyes are like the diamond bright, but mine are dull as lead."

VI.
Alas, alas! how very soon this silly little fly,
Hearing his wily, flattering words, came slowly flitting by;
With buzzing wings she hung aloft, then near and nearer drew,
Thinking only of her brilliant eyes, and green and purple hue;–
Thinking only of her crested head – poor foolish thing! – At last
Up jumped the cunning spider, and fiercely held her fast.

VII.
He dragged her up his winding stair, into his dismal den,
Within his little parlour – but she ne'er came out again!
– And now, dear little children, who may this story read,
To idle, silly, flattering words, I pray you ne'er give heed:
Unto an evil counsellor, close heart, and ear, and eye,
And take a lesson from this tale, of the Spider and the Fly.

— Mary Howitt (1828)

== Adaptations ==
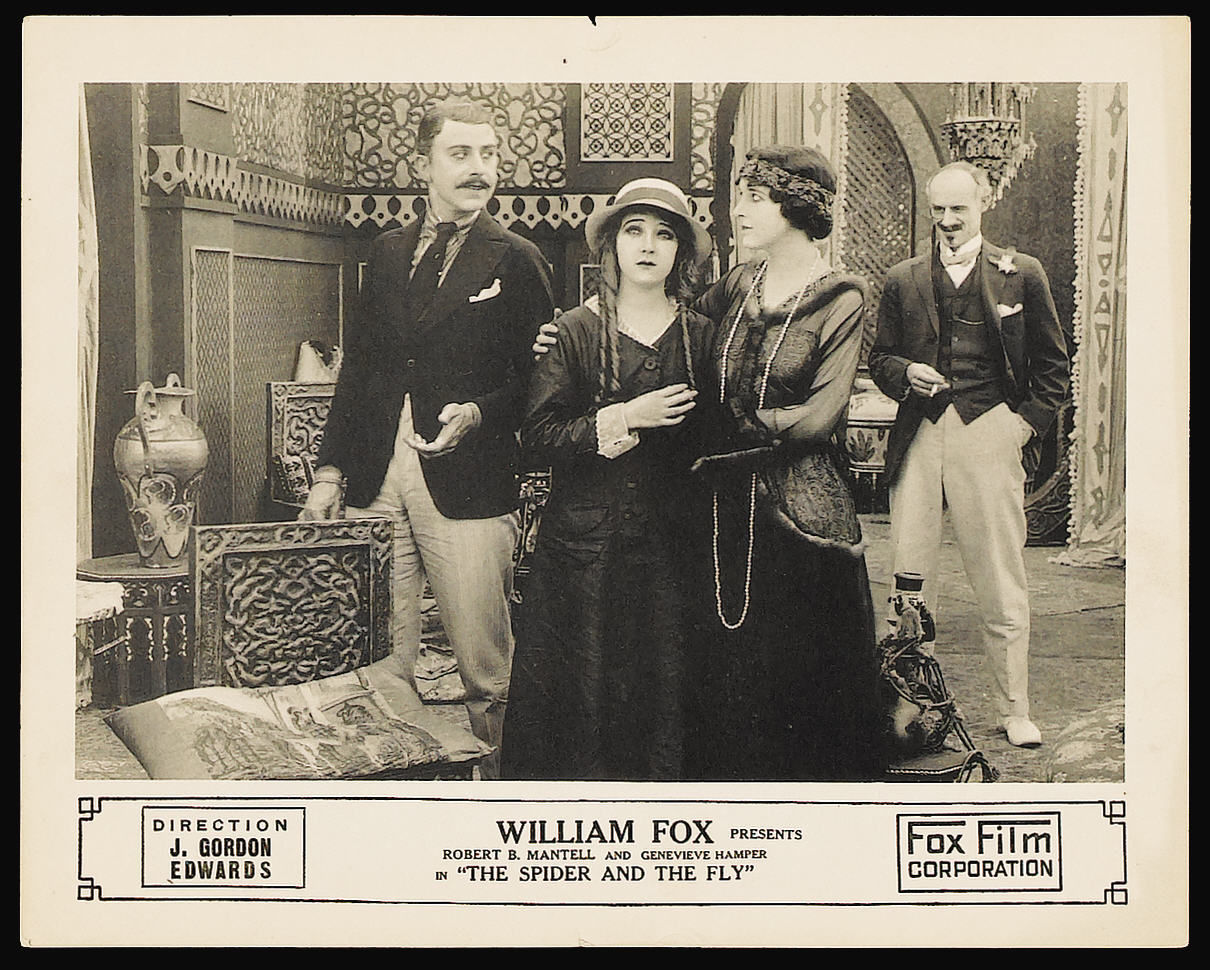
The Spider and the Fly lobby card

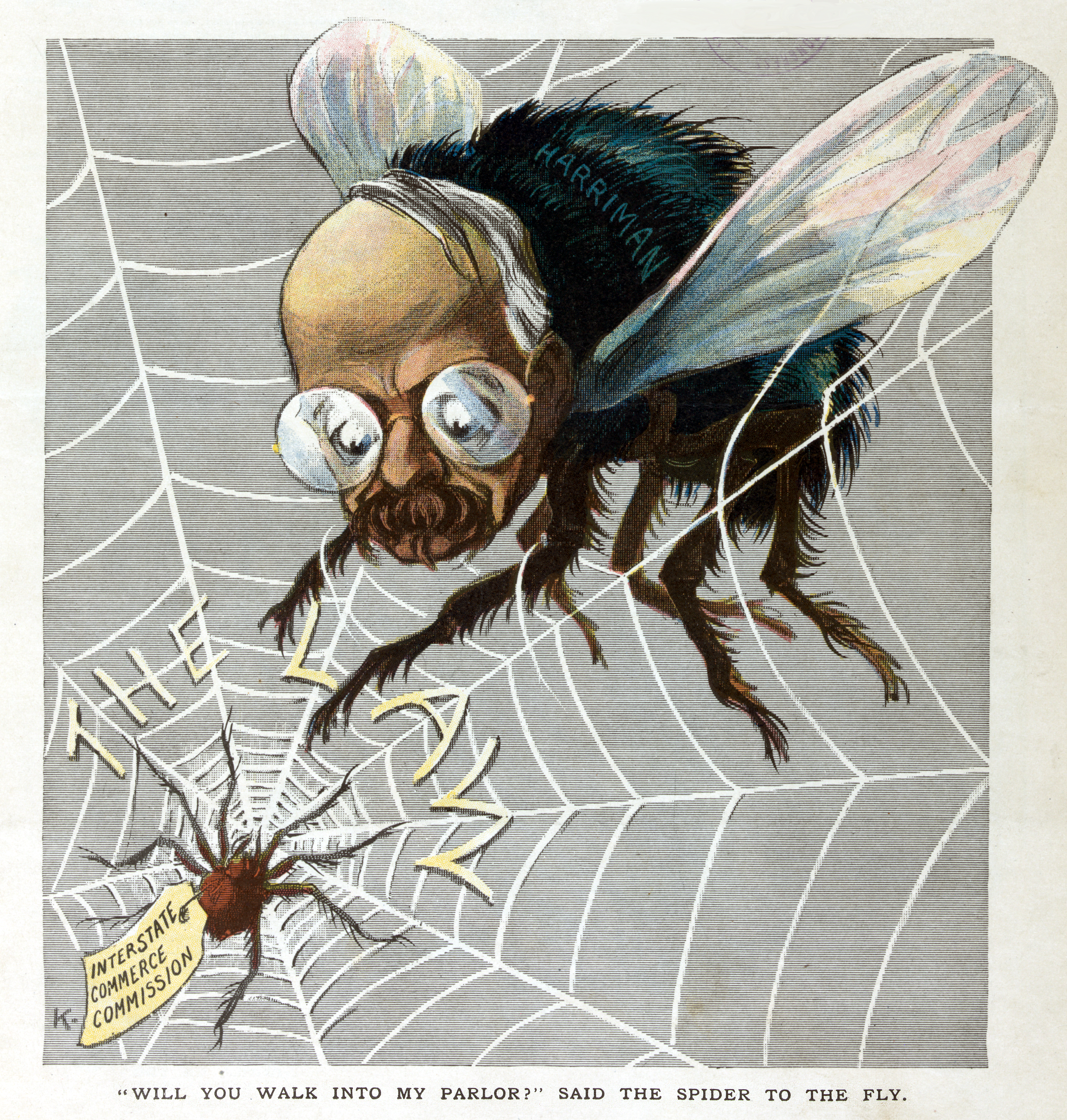
1907 cartoon, 'Will you walk into my parlor?' said the Spider to the Fly. Railroad tycoon E. H. Harriman is depicted as a fly on a spider web labeled "The Law," subject to the control of the Interstate Commerce Commission, depicted here as the spider.

Cinema

- 1916 film featuring Robert B. Mantell
- 1949 British crime film
- 1923 cartoon: theatrical short by Aesop Fables Studio.

Music

- 1930 song by Barbecue Bob
- 1938 song by Fats Waller, Andy Razaf, and J. C. Johnson
- 1965 song by The Rolling Stones
- 1989 song by The Cure ("Lullaby") references the poem
- 1992 song by London After Midnight
- 2004 song by The Paper Chase

Illustration

- An illustrated version by Tony DiTerlizzi was a 2003 Caldecott Honor Book.

== See also ==
- Cultural depictions of spiders
