= Arthur John Newman Tremearne =

A. J. N. Tremearne

Major Arthur John Newman Tremearne (1877 – 25 September 1915) was a British barrister, major ("D" Company. 1st/22nd Battalion, London Regiment attached to the 8th Battalion Seaforth Highlanders), anthropologist and ethnographer.

== Life ==
Tremearne was born in Melbourne in 1877, son of Ada Tremearne, of Melbourne, Australia, and John Tremearne MRCS. He was educated at Christ's College, Cambridge.

He was a lieutenant in the Second Boer War, but was invalided to England on 1 June 1900. He was struck off field strength on joining the Ashanti Field Force. He married Mary Louisa Tremearne, from Blackheath, London, in 1905. He was a masonic deacon in the Royal Colonial Institute No. 3556 E.C. lodge.

He died at the Battle of Loos. He left an estate of £4638 5/6. There is a memorial;.

== Head measuring device ==
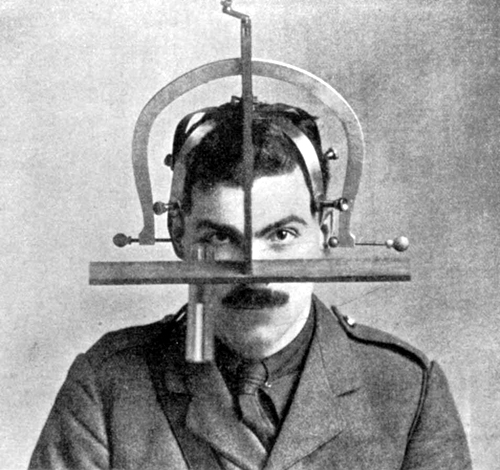

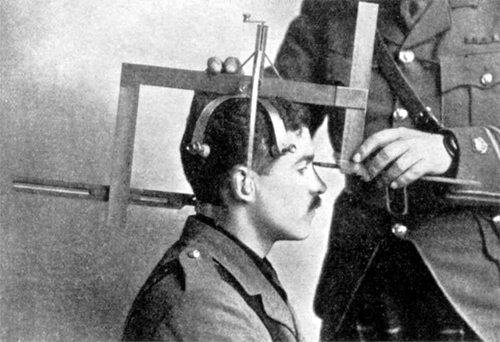

In 1913 Tremearne developed a head-measuring device, which was modified with suggestions from Karl Pearson.

== Publications ==
- The tailed head-hunters of Nigeria: an account of an official's seven years experiences in the Northern Nigerian Pagan Belt; and a description of the manners, habits, and customs of the native tribes. London (1912)
- Hausa superstitions and customs: an introduction to the Folk-Lore and the Folk. London (1913). Als PDF (62 MB)
- Some Austral-African notes and anecdotes. John Bale Sons & Danielsson, London (1913)
- The Ban of the Bori. Demons and demon-dancing in West and North-Africa. London (1914)
- Chapter in Georg Buschan's Die Sitten der Völker. Bd. 2, Union Deutsche Verlagsges., Stuttgart um 1920
