= Slaad =

Fictional Dungeons & Dragons monster

- First appearance: Fiend Folio (1981)

In-universe information
- Type: Outsider
- Alignment: Chaotic neutral

The slaad (pluralized as slaadi, or as slaads in the 4th edition) is a fictional monster in the Dungeons & Dragons fantasy role-playing game. They are extraplanar creatures (outsiders) that resemble giant humanoid toads of various colors (red, blue, grey, white, black), and other types, such as mud, and death slaadi.

== Publication history ==
=== Development and licensing ===
The slaadi were created by Charles Stross and published in the TSR UK book Fiend Folio: Tome of Creatures Malevolent and Benign (1981). Stross said of their creation:

Well, the fact that I was running a fever when I came up with the Slaadi is probably not going to surprise anyone—think of 'em as my independent exploration of Lovecraftiana. (I didn't discover H. P. Lovecraft until a couple of years later.)... Think "Lovecraft mythos", as invented by someone who hasn't read Lovecraft (or heard of him). The Slaadi were going to be basically representatives of, and devotees of, total chaos—with an added warped sense of humour.

For much of their existence, the slaadi were the subject of jokes by D&D players due to their distinctly frog-like appearance, which was emphasized in early artistic depictions of the monsters. With the advent of the Planescape campaign setting, TSR, Inc. made an effort to create a more fearsome image of the slaadi, with their toad qualities toned down in favor of showing more frightening aspects depicting them as beings of pure chaos. This Planescape envisioning of the slaadi carried forth into the 3rd Edition of the D&D game and has persisted ever since.

Because they were created by a D&D player (and their copyrights transferred to TSR and, subsequently, Wizards of the Coast), slaadi are one of only a handful of D&D monsters considered "Product Identity" by Wizards of the Coast and, as such, are not released under its Open Gaming License.

=== Advanced Dungeons & Dragons 1st edition (1977–1988) ===
The blue slaad, death slaad (the lesser masters), the green slaad, the grey slaad (the executioners), and the red slaad appear in the first edition Fiend Folio (1981), along with Ssendam, Lord of the Insane, and Ygorl, Lord of Entropy. Ed Greenwood, in his review of the Fiend Folio for Dragon magazine, considered the slaad "worthy additions to any campaign".

The slaadi and their role in the planes are detailed in this edition's Manual of the Planes (1987).

Another slaad lord, Wartle, appeared in the adventure anthology, Tales of the Outer Planes (1988).

=== Advanced Dungeons & Dragons 2nd edition (1989–1999) ===
The blue slaad, death slaad, the gray slaad, the green slaad, and the red slaad appear first in the Monstrous Compendium Outer Planes Appendix (1991), and are reprinted in the Monstrous Manual (1993). The same set of slaadi appear for the Planescape campaign setting in the first Planescape Monstrous Compendium Appendix (1994).

Ygorl and Ssendam appear in Dragon #221 (September 1995) in the "Dragon's Bestiary" column; the same article also introduced two new slaad lords: Chourst, Lord of Randomness, and Rennbuu, Lord of Colors.

The baby red slaad and the young red slaad appear in Dungeon #77 (November 1999).

=== Dungeons & Dragons 3.0 edition (2000–2002) ===
The blue slaad, death slaad, the gray slaad, the green slaad, and the red slaad appear in the Monster Manual for this edition (2000).

The slaadi and their role in the planes are detailed in this edition's Manual of the Planes (2001). The black slaad and the white slaad appeared in the Epic Level Handbook (2002).

The gormeel appeared in Dragon #306 (April 2003).

The mud slaad appears in the Fiend Folio (2003) for this edition.

=== Dungeons & Dragons 3.5 edition (2003–2007) ===
The blue slaad, death slaad, the gray slaad, the green slaad, and the red slaad appear in the revised Monster Manual for this edition (2003).

Another new slaad lord, Bazim-Gorag the Firebringer, first appeared in Dungeon #101 (August 2003). Bazim-Gorag later appeared in the Forgotten Realms book, Champions of Ruin (2005).

=== Dungeons & Dragons 4th edition (2008–2014) ===
The slaadi, pluralised as slaads, appear in the Monster Manual for this edition (2008). In 4th edition, the slaads are elemental creatures, native to the Elemental Chaos.

=== Dungeons & Dragons 5th edition (2014–present) ===
The slaadi appear in this edition of the Monster Manual, with additional lore about the reproduction of slaadi. It also includes information concerning The Spawning Stone that was created by Primus, which ultimately led to the creation of the slaadi.

== Cultural impact ==
Charles Stross, creator of the slaadi, used the creatures in his 2007 novel Halting State, where they appeared as an enemy in the fictional MMORPG Avalon Four.

The word "slaad" has been used to describe frog-like monsters in the comic Yamara and the webcomic Shadowgirls, which uses the word "slaad" to describe a race of monsters.

In Rich Burlew's Order of the Stick, a chaotic evil character expresses surprise at two shoulder devils appearing instead of one devil and one angel; as he has no good or lawful sides whatsoever, the devils explain that the character has only them and the slaad.

Slaadi have appeared in 3rd-party game sourcebooks such as the Tome of Horrors from Necromancer Games. It was parodied in the HackMaster Hacklopedia of Beasts, published by Kenzer & Company. The plot of the Downer series of graphic novels by Kyle Stanley Hunter, published by Paizo Publishing, revolves around a slaad-created artifact.

== Depiction ==
In the D&D game slaadi are native to the Outer Plane of Limbo. As such they are of the outsider type, being composed of the essence of their home plane. Encountered on most other planes they also receive the extraplanar subtype. Slaadi are almost always chaotic neutral except for the death slaadi, which are usually chaotic evil, and the gormeel slaadi, which are usually lawful neutral.

In the various D&D products in which they are presented, slaadi are described as frog or toad-like humanoids. Within that rough characterization they have a wide range of forms depending on subtype, and often corresponding to their rank in society. Size also varies between the different subtypes, from human sized to several feet taller than human sized.

GameSpy author Allan Rausch described the slaadi as "remorseless reptilian killing machines". They might have become "popular creatures among players", but "For many years, slaad were a joke -- because of their artwork", which showed them as "six-foot tall carnivorous frogs". With the Planescape setting they "were reinterpreted artistically to be less frog-like and much more fearsome", a development continued into the 3rd edition of the game.

=== Society ===
In various editions of D&D the slaadi have been depicted as having a complex social system bound up in the relationship and reproductive cycles of the various subtypes. Some subtypes dominate others, though as slaadi are creatures of chaos, such domination occurs not through a regimented hierarchy, but by brute force. In earlier D&D editions a symbol of power was embedded in each slaad's forehead, and non-magical tattoos on the forehead represented achievements and status. The latter physical characteristics do not appear in 3rd and later editions of D&D. In earlier editions of D&D the slaad were divided only into red, blue, green, gray and death subtypes. 3rd Edition D&D added the mud, and epic level white and black subtypes. In all editions the slaad have been dominated by the Slaad Lords, Ssendam and Ygorl.

Red and blue slaadi reproduce by infecting living hosts. The red do so by implanting eggs beneath their victim's skin which grow into a baby blue slaad that eats the host from within. The blue infect the host with a lycanthropy-like disease that slowly transforms them into a red slaad. Despite being the means of producing the other slaad type, reds and blues despise one another. If either a red slaad or blue slaad infects an arcane spellcaster, the host will spawn a green slaad, superior to its parent in that it may cast spells. A green slaad, upon reaching its hundredth year of life, will retreat into isolation for the duration of about a year. Upon its return it has transformed into a smaller, but more powerful grey slaad, which focus more on spell-casting than most other slaadi. Some grey slaadi undergo an unnamed, mysterious ritual, which transforms them into death slaadi. Death slaadi possess amazing magical and physical might, but eschew focusing on the former, as the greys do, being bent more on perpetuating slaughter and death. As such, death slaad tend more towards an evil alignment than do most other slaadi. If the death slaad survives a century, it turns into the white slaad. If the white slaad survives a century, it turns into a black slaad in the manner of its preceding transformations. The black slaad is the most powerful slaad, excluding the slaad lords. The reproductive cycle of mud slaadi is not detailed.

The Spawning Stone is the primordial home of the slaadi, located in "a realm of their greatest dominion", and drifting about Limbo. The passage of the stone generates currents in the raw chaos-stuff of the plane, and slaadi are able to follow these currents "upstream" to the Stone's location. In the mating season, each race of slaad converges on the Spawning Stone, wresting the Stone away from the previous group, so that they may fertilize each other's internal egg sacs, and carry away the seed-like fertilized eggs for later implantation into host bodies. Sometimes, however, young slaadi are produced right there at the stone because the slaadi implant each other in their mating frenzy. Thus, dead adult slaadi routinely float about the stone until destroyed by the chaos of Limbo. True slaadi are described as beings of ultimate chaos who have no set form. Only the Slaad Lords Ssendam and Ygorl are representative of this type. Somehow they affected the 'Spawning Stone' to prevent the emergence of slaadi more powerful than them, which keeps the slaadi within the aforementioned groups. Although anomalies do slip through in the chaos, they have less variety, and less chance of being more powerful than the Slaad Lords. One such anomaly is the Gormeel Slaad, which is a subtype introduced in an article in Dragon as a large, mutant variety "born from the Spawning Stone", and escaping the notice of Ygorl and Ssendam. They are lawful in alignment, serving as allies and sometimes mounts of the githzerai against other slaadi.

In 5e, the Spawning Stone was revealed to be created by the modron leader Primus in an attempt to tame Limbo, but the plane corrupted its original purpose and produced the slaadi as an immune response. Their reproductive process is an expression of how Limbo turned the Stone, an artifact of pure Law, into a tool of Chaos.

== Slaad Lords ==
Slaad Lords are the de facto rulers of the Slaadi race. True to their chaotic nature, they often do not appear anything like other Slaadi. Known slaad lords include Ygorl, Lord of Entropy; Ssendam, Lord of Madness; Chourst, Lord of Randomness; Rennbuu, Lord of Colors; and Wartle.

- Chourst the Unpredictable is the slaad Lord of Randomness. Chourst appeared in second edition in Dragon #221 (September 1995). Chourst has no residence, home base, or even any temporary domicile; he feels at home wherever he goes. Chourst has no particular dogma; he only wishes to indulge himself whenever and wherever possible. One moment he may be tearing a githzerai to pieces, and the next he may stop suddenly to sniff a pretty flower that caught his fancy.
- Ssendam is the Slaad Lord of Insanity. Ssendam was created by Charles Stross, and first appeared in the first edition Fiend Folio (1981). Ssendam appears as a gigantic golden amoeba with a humanoid brain as a nucleus. Ssendam has been described alternatively as male and female in different sources.
- Ygorl is the Slaad Lord of Entropy. He was created by Charles Stross, and first appeared in the first edition Fiend Folio (1981). Ygorl is the second oldest slaad lord, after Ssendam, and is considered the de facto ruler of Outer Plane of Limbo. He is said to have created the Spawning Stone that is the focus of the slaad race, forcing them to take froglike forms rather than their original, purely chaotic shapes.

== Famous Slaadi ==
=== Forgotten Realms, The Erevis Cale trilogy ===
In Paul S. Kemp's Erevis Cale trilogy, the main antagonist known as the Sojourner has four slaadi henchmen that he refers to as his "children" named Azriim, Dolgan, Eleura and Serrin. In the books they appear to be bound to the Sojourner, and serve as a constant foe to Erevis Cale and his companions as they try to thwart the Sojourner. They are all green slaadi and have been granted various powers by the Sojourner. They can cast magic, shapeshift, heal at a very fast rate, and have telepathy. They all tend to choose a human form that suits their taste and only transform back into their slaad forms at certain occasions, mostly when they feed or fight. Azriim (the leader) chooses a half-drow form with 2 different color eyes, Dolgan chooses a Cormyrean warrior and is the dumb brute of the gang, Serrin is dark and assassin-like and chooses a slender human. Their true slaad forms are green, very large, scaled reptiles, with powerful legs, long claws, and sharp teeth. During the series the Sojourner, with the power to destroy worlds at a whim, transforms Dolgan and Azriim into gray slaadi as a reward. They are portrayed as a mix between a moth and reptile, and have the ability to fly. They are later transformed into death slaadi, which are portrayed as their original reptilian slaad form, with slightly altered physical features. Their most notable trait is that they appear almost see-through and have much stronger abilities. At the end of the trilogy Azriim alone survived and went to his way.

=== Xanxost ===
Xanxost is a blue slaad with a penchant for exploring the planes, explaining their secrets to everyone interested, and eating whatever he can catch, particularly mephits. He appears as a character in the Planescape accessories Faces of Evil: The Fiends and The Inner Planes. Both of these books are written in an in-universe style, as if they were created by someone within the Planescape setting, and within that writing style, both books have an 'editor' who collected the investigations and opinions of various planar creatures on the topic at hand. Xanxost is one such character. "Though his mannerisms are often odd, his information is always reliable".

In Faces of Evil he is one of the 'authors' of the section on tanar'ri, and in The Inner Planes he 'wrote' the section on the Quasielemental Plane of Steam. (The editor of the latter book claims that he was recruited to pen the chapter because feedback to his commentary in the former book was overwhelmingly positive.) Xanxost seems less chaotic than other slaadi in that he can write a mostly coherent piece of text, though his nature still shows through in his writing style, with many wanderings off-topic (mostly to the subject of food), repetitions of earlier remarks, and a seeming inability to count. He also refers to himself in third person. He also admits that his conflicts with tanar'ri have edged him slightly from pure Chaos towards the side of Good, at least for the time being. Xanxost is referred to as "it" in Faces of Evil, which makes some sense given the unusual nature of slaadi reproduction, but as "he" in The Inner Planes.

=== Zgotar ===
Zgotar, a death slaad, appears in Scott Bennie's "Threshold of Evil" adventure in Dungeon Magazine #10. The primary villain of that adventure, Azurax Silverhawk, has been officially placed in the Forgotten Realms campaign setting. However, Zgotar also appeared in Castle Greyhawk (1987) in an adventure scenario also written by Scott Bennie. In addition, Azurax is called a "plane-wandering archmage" and Old Empires said he has only recently purchased his property in the Hills of Maerth.

== Reception ==
Ed Greenwood considered the slaadi "worthy additions to any campaign".

GameSpy author Allan Rausch described the slaadi as "remorseless reptilian killing machines", but "For many years, slaad were a joke — because of their artwork", which showed them as "six-foot tall carnivorous frogs". With the Planescape setting, they "were reinterpreted artistically to be less frog-like and much more fearsome".

Shannon Applecline considered the slaad one of the game's especially notable monsters.

== In other media ==
- The slaad lord Ygorl appeared as the final boss in the video game Forgotten Realms: Demon Stone, where he was voiced by Michael Clarke Duncan. In the game, Ygorl was depicted as humanoid in appearance but was covered in tough chitinous armor and had many claw-like mandibles extending from the back of his head.
- Slaadi appear as enemies in the Dungeons & Dragons-based MMORPG Dungeons & Dragons Online, and also in Neverwinter.

== See also ==
- Bullywug, a frog-like D&D race
