= Monsters in Dungeons & Dragons =

Group of fictitious creatures

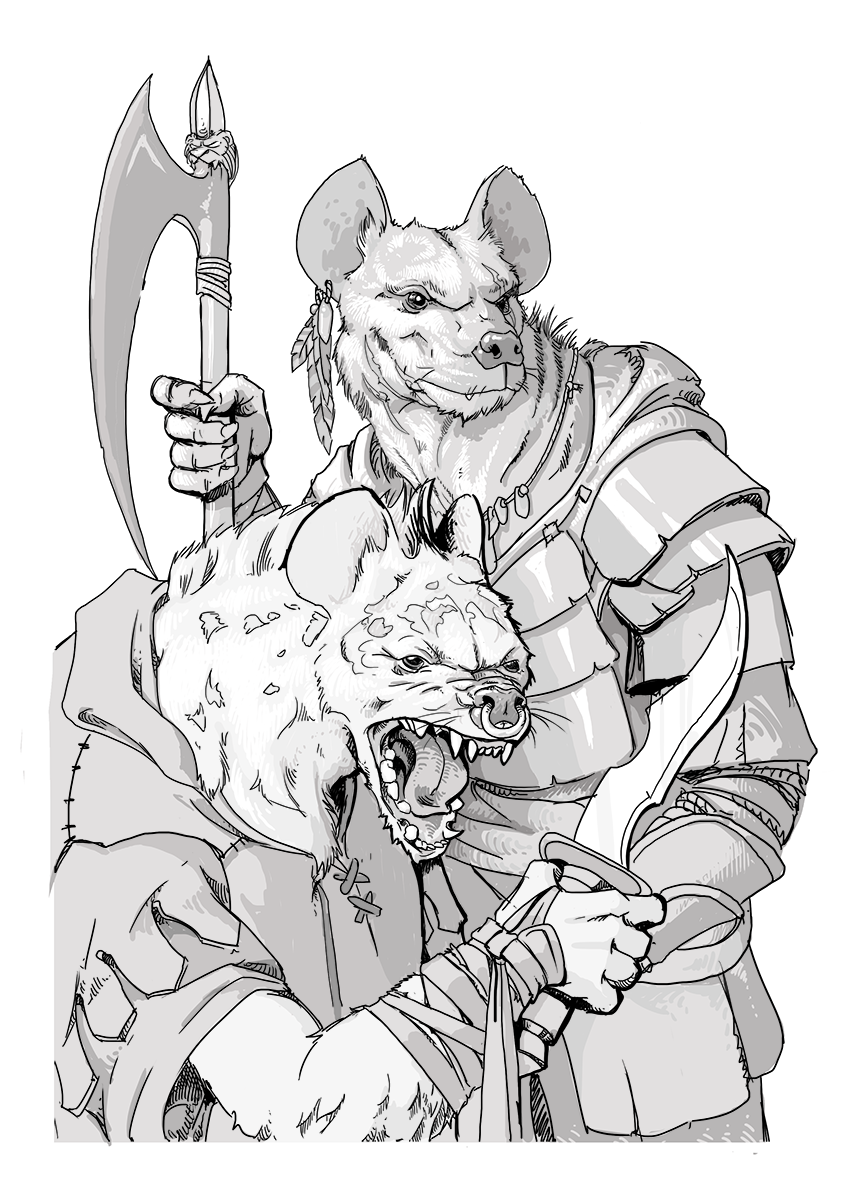
A pair of gnolls – hyena-headed humanoids

In the Dungeons & Dragons fantasy role-playing game, the term monster refers to a variety of creatures, some adapted from folklore and legends and others invented specifically for the game. Included are traditional monsters such as dragons, supernatural creatures such as ghosts, and mundane or fantastic animals. A defining feature of the game is that monsters are typically obstacles that players must overcome to progress through the game. Beginning with the first edition in 1974, a catalog of game monsters (bestiary) was included along with other game manuals, first called Monsters & Treasure and now called the Monster Manual. As an essential part of Dungeons & Dragons, many of its monsters have become iconic and recognizable even outside D&D, becoming influential in video games, fiction, and popular culture.

== Origins ==
While many "bizarre and grotesque creatures" are original creations of Dungeons & Dragons, the inspiration for others includes real-world fauna, mythology, "bestiaries of the later Middle Ages", science-fiction, fantasy literature, and film. Mauricio Rangel Jiménez goes so far to say that a basic knowledge of mythology, religion and fantasy is required to keep pace with the game, although the "creatures were unbound by time or place" of their original sources and co-creator Gary Gygax "made them coexist in a single aggregate world". With regard to pre-modern sources, scholar Laurent Di Filippo remarked that game creators often do not rely directly on original texts. Rather the material undergoes "cultural processes of transmission which go from medieval sources to the productions of contemporary cultural industries [...]. These transformations may be the result of translations or adaptations. This process of continuous evolution which involves both permanence and change is called 'work on myth [Arbeit am Mythos]' by the German philosopher Hans Blumenberg."

Because of their broad, inclusive background, D&D monsters have been called a pastiche of sources. In some cases, this has resulted in legal battles, such as when names taken from the works of J. R. R. Tolkien had to be changed due to copyright disputes.

In game books, monsters are typically presented with illustrations, game statistics, and a detailed description. Monsters may be adapted to fit the needs of the game's writers and publishers, such as by describing combat abilities that may have been absent or only implied by an original source. Artistic renderings of various creatures have been a central tool for immersion in the game from the point of its creation.

== Influence and criticism ==
The monsters of Dungeons & Dragons have significantly influenced modern fantasy fiction, ranging from licensed fiction to how monsters are portrayed in fantasy fiction generally. The scope of this influence has been compared to the works of J. R. R. Tolkien. In a 2005 interview, author China Miéville stated,

I use AD&D-type fascination with teratology in a lot of my books, and I have the original Monster Manual, and the Monster Manual 2, and the Fiend Folio. I still collect role-playing game bestiaries, because I find that kind of fascination with the creation of the monstrous tremendously inspiring.

References and homages to Dungeons & Dragons monsters can be found in works such as Adventure Time, and the game's monsters have inspired tributes that both celebrate and mock various creatures. A 2013 io9 retrospective detailed memorable monsters, and in 2018 SyFy Wire published a list of "The 9 Scariest, Most Unforgettable Monsters From Dungeons & Dragons", and in the same year Screen Rant published a list of the game's "10 Most Powerful (and 10 Weakest) Monsters, Ranked". Other writers have highlighted the game's more odd or eccentric creations, such as Geek.com's list of "The most underrated monsters of Advanced Dungeons & Dragons", The Escapist's list of "The Dumbest Dungeons & Dragons Monsters Ever (And How To Use Them)", and Cracked.com's "The 15 Most Idiotic Monsters in Dungeons & Dragons History". D&D's monsters have also been licensed as toys, like in LJN's action figures, and even candy.

The number and variety of different monsters contributes to keeping the game interesting and forces players to think about employing diverse strategies.

The monsters of Dungeons & Dragons have received criticism from multiple sources. In addition to other game elements, the presence of magical or demonic monsters has provoked moral panics among religious conservatives. While some of the presented creatures are friendly or harmless, the game's emphasis on slaying monsters has also elicited negative commentary. As monsters have traditionally been defined by the number of "experience points" they award when killed, the game has been said to promote a "sociopathic" violence where the dungeon master "merely referees one imagined slaughter after another." Nicholas J. Mizer, in contrast, suggested that experience through combat was an in-game variation on Thorstein Veblen's theory that application of the "predatory spirit" of humans to warfare could lead to high standing in society. Environmental humanities scholar Matthew Chrulew summarized that the impact of "such violent imaginings and enactments" has "long been a matter of dispute", and has variously been judged "inciting or cathartic".

Some female monsters, such as the nymph and succubus, were seen by Philip J. Clements as an instance of the sexist tropes the game draws on which presented female sexuality as inherently dangerous.

== Monster types ==
Many kinds of monsters can be classified into typologies based on their common characteristics, and various books and game guides have been produced focusing on specific kinds of monsters. Such groupings include humanoids, monstrosities, dragons, giants, undead, aberrations, fiends, celestials, fey, elementals, constructs, oozes and plants; and beasts. There is some flexibility within these groupings. For example, many kinds of creatures can become undead or can be used to form magical constructs.

The 3rd edition of the game also used a broader type named "outsiders", encompassing any creature from the Outer Planes or Inner Planes.

== Notable monsters ==
=== Monster Manual (1977) ===
The Monster Manual (1977) was the initial monster book for the first edition of the Advanced Dungeons & Dragons game, published by TSR, Inc. in 1977. Gary Gygax wrote much of the work himself, having included and expanded most of the monsters from the previous D&D supplements. Also included are monsters originally printed in The Strategic Review, as well as some originally found in early issues of The Dragon and other early game materials. This book expanded on the original monster format by including the stat lines on the same page as the monsters' descriptions and introducing more stats, expanding the length of most monster descriptions, and featuring illustrations for most of the monsters. The book contains a treasure chart and an index of major listings.

Creature	Page	Other appearances	Variants	Description
Beholder	10	Supplement I: Greyhawk (1974), Dragon #76 "The Ecology of the Beholder" (1983), D&D Companion Rules (1984), MC1 – Monstrous Compendium Volume One (1989), Dungeons & Dragons Rules Cyclopedia (1991), Monstrous Manual (1993), I, Tyrant (1996), Monster Manual (2000), Monster Manual v.3.5 (2003), D&D Miniatures: Deathknell set #32 (2005)		Hateful, aggressive, avaricious spherical monster that is most frequently found underground
Bulette	12	Dragon #1 (1976), Dragon #74 "The Ecology of the Bulette" (1983), MC2 – Monstrous Compendium Volume Two (1989), Monstrous Manual (1993), Monster Manual (2000), Monster Manual v.3.5 (2003), D&D Miniatures: Giants of Legend set #67 (2004)		This "slow-witted, roughly bullet-shaped" monster also known as landshark burrows underground and feeds on humans, horses, and halflings. Originally inspired by a cheap plastic toy, the bulette was one of the first monsters specifically created for D&D, and has been included in every edition of D&D, although various aspects of the monster have changed from edition to edition. Author Keith Ammann called bulettes "brutes tailor-made to give your players jump scares" and found its preferences and aversions for the meat of different humanoid races "ludicrous". BoLS writer J.R. Zambrano found it "kind of goofy" and a "really fun monster to fight". It has appeared in several other media.
Devil	20-23			Don Turnbull considered the devils the most prominent among the new monsters introduced in the Monster Manual: "they are all pretty strong and compare not unfavourably in this respect with the Demons we already know".
Displacer beast	28	Supplement I: Greyhawk (1974), D&D Basic Set (1977), D&D Expert Set (1981, 1983), Dragon #109 "The Ecology of the Displacer Beast" (1986), MC 1 – Monstrous Compendium Volume One (1989), Dungeons & Dragons Rules Cyclopedia (1991), Monstrous Manual (1993), Monster Manual (2000), Monster Manual v.3.5 (2003) (also includes a Pack Lord), D&D Miniatures: Harbinger set #41 (2003), D&D Miniatures: War of the Dragon Queen set #29 (2006) (Displacer Beast Pack Lord), D&D Miniatures: Unhallowed set #37 (2007) (Displacer Beast Manhunter)		Panther-like beast, that always appears to be three feet away from its actual position
Gelatinous cube	43	Supplement I: Greyhawk (1974)		Cubic scavengers, who cleanse living organism and carrion from the floor and walls of underground passageways
Hell hound	51	Supplement I: Greyhawk (1974)		Not from the material plane, breathes out scorching fire. Don Turnbull noted that the breath weapon of the "much-feared" hell hound has been altered from its previous appearance.
Jackalwere	56			An intelligent jackal with the ability to assume human and jackal-human-hybrid form and a sleep-inducing gaze.
Kirin	57	Eldritch Wizardry (1976), Monstrous Compendium Volume Two (1989), Monstrous Manual (1993), psionic variant of the ki-rin in The Complete Psionics Handbook (1991), third edition Oriental Adventures (2001)		Race of lawful good aerial creatures that will aid humans if the need to combat evil is great An obituary to Gary Gygax specifically highlights the Ki-rin as an example of the way in which D&D embraces world culture and folklore.
Lich	61	Supplement I: Greyhawk (1974)		Created with the use of powerful and arcane magic, formerly ultra powerful magic-users now non-human and non-living
Mimic	70			Subterranean creatures that are able to perfectly mimic stone and wood
Mind flayer	70	Eldritch Wizardry		Evil subterranean creature that considers humanity as cattle to feed upon, draws forth brains with its tentacles
Mummy	72	Dungeons & Dragons set (1974)		Undead humans that retain a semblance of life and seek to destroy living things. Don Turnbull noted that the mummy was revised from its previous statistics, and could now cause paralysis on sight (as a result of fear).
Night hag	73			Rule the convoluted planes of Hades, form larvae (see above) from evil persons they slay, and sell to demons and devils. Don Turnbull referred to the night hag as "splendid" and notes that the illustration of the night hag is the best drawing in the book.
Otyugh	77			Weird omnivorous scavengers whose diet consists of dung, offal, and carrion, always found underground. Don Turnbull referred to the otyugh as a "most interesting creation". Witwer et al. viewed its artistic rendering in 5th edition as "redesigned from prior editions to entice more Dungeon Master use."
Owlbear	77	Supplement I: Greyhawk (1974)		Horrible creatures that inhabit tangled forest regions, attacks with great claws and snapping beak
Rust monster	83	Supplement I: Greyhawk (1974)		Large armored tick-like monster which devours metals. An original invention for the game and its artificial underground world, the appearance of the rust monster was inspired by a plastic toy from Hong Kong. It was ranked among the most memorable as well as obnoxious creatures in the game, terrifying to certain characters and their players not due to their ability to fight but to destroy their items. Chris Sims of the on-line magazine Comics Alliance referred to the rust monster as "the most feared D&D monster".
Shadow	86	Supplement I: Greyhawk (1974)		Horrible undead creatures that drain strength merely by touching an opponent. Don Turnbull noted his disappointment that the shadow in the Monster Manual is of the undead class and thus subject to a cleric's turn undead ability: "I used to enjoy seeing clerics vainly trying to turn what wouldn't turn, when Shadows were first met".

=== Fiend Folio (1981) ===
The Fiend Folio: Tome of Creatures Malevolent and Benign was the second monster book for the first edition of Advanced Dungeons & Dragons, published in 1981. The Fiend Folio consisted mostly of monsters submitted to White Dwarf's "Fiend Factory" column. The monsters in this book are presented in the same format as those in the previous Monster Manual work, and most featured illustrations of the monsters.

Creature	Page	Other appearances	Variants	Description
Al-mi'raj	11–12	MC14 – Monstrous Compendium Fiend Folio Appendix (1992)		Resembles yellow hare with black horn, drawn by Roger Musson, based on Al-mi'raj "in Islamic poetry, a yellow hare with a single black horn on its head." Counted among the saddest, lamest creatures in Fiend Folio by artist Sean McCarthy (b. 1976), a hybrid creature with physiology resulting from maladaptation rather than evil.
Carbuncle	17–18	White Dwarf #8 (1978), Best of White Dwarf Scenarios (1980), Tome of Horrors (2002)		The carbuncle of AD&D is an armadillo-like creature with a ruby in its head, drawn by Albie Fiore. The carbuncle is another among the saddest, lamest entries in Fiend Folio according to artist Sean McCarthy.
Frost man	40	Frostburn (2004) (as Frost folk)		Geek.com included this humanoid in its list of "most underrated monsters" and commented referring to the Fiend Folio image: "with his ability to radiate Frost, well manicured beard, magnificent head of hair, hatchet, eye patch, caveman style outfit, and comfortable shoes, the Frost Man is the entire package".
Hook horror	51	White Dwarf #12 (1979), Best of White Dwarf Scenarios (1980), Monstrous Manual (1993)		A bipedal, subterranean monster that looks like a vulture-like humanoid with bony hooks in place of hands. The hook horror was first published in White Dwarf #12 (April–May 1979), and was originally submitted by Ian Livingstone. It was voted among the top ten monsters from the magazine's "Fiend Factory" column and reprinted in Best of White Dwarf Articles (1980). Ed Greenwood, in his review of the Fiend Folio for Dragon magazine, considered the hook horror as one of the creatures with "strange appearances and little else; there is no depth to their listings" and that it was one of the creatures which "seem incomplete". Witwer et al. viewed its artistic rendering in 5th edition as "redesigned from prior editions to entice more Dungeon Master use."

=== Monster Manual II (1983) ===
Monster Manual II was the third and final monster book for the first edition of Advanced Dungeons & Dragons, published in 1983, and has the largest page count of the three. As with the Monster Manual, this book was written primarily by Gary Gygax. This book contains a number of monsters that previously appeared in limited circulation and a large amount of its contents was entirely new at publication. The monsters in this book are presented in the same format as the Monster Manual and Fiend Folio.

Creature	Page	Other appearances	Variants	Description
Bat, giant	14	D&D Basic Set (1981), D&D Basic Set (1983), MC1 – Monstrous Compendium Volume One (1989), Dungeons & Dragons Rules Cyclopedia (1991), Monstrous Manual (1993)		The giant bat in the Fiend Folio is exactly what its name would suggest—a giant form of bat with a 6' wingspan. White Dwarf reviewer Jamie Thomson commented on the giant bat, noting that it "seems an obvious choice for D&D".
Death dog	23			White Dwarf reviewer Jamie Thomson commented on the death dog, which is "rumored to be a descendant of Cerberus".
Executioner's hood	64			Hood-shaped monster that functions as a trap which "envelops a victim's head and slowly strangles them". Included in Geek.com's list of "The most underrated monsters of Advanced Dungeons & Dragons": After pouring alcohol on the creature as a creative way to defeat it, it may make "the coolest party mascot/drinking buddy in all the realms".
Grue, elemental	72–74			Described are the chagrin, harginn, ildriss, and verrdig. White Dwarf reviewer Megan C. Evans referred to the grues as "a collection of terrifying beasties from the Elemental Planes".
Stegocentipede	114–115			Lawrence Schick described the stegocentipede as "a giant arthropod notable for its twin row of back plates (wow!)"
Stench kow	115	Monstrous Manual (1993), Polyhedron #133 (December 1998), Tome of Horror (2002), pp. 243–244 from Necromancer Games		Lawrence Schick described the stench kow as "a monstrous bison that smells real bad".

=== Fiends ===
Fiend is a term used in the Dungeons & Dragons fantasy role-playing game to refer to any malicious otherworldly creatures within the Dungeons & Dragons universe. These include various races of demons and devils that are of an evil alignment and hail from the Lower Planes. All fiends are extraplanar outsiders. Fiends have been considered among "D&D's most classic monsters".

==== Demons ====
Demons are a chaotic evil race native to the Abyss; these "magical and occult" creatures are rapacious, cruel and arbitrary. They are also portrayed as more widespread than other races of fiends, as the Abyss and its population are both theoretically infinite in size. The dominant race of demons is the tanar'ri (/təˈnɑːri/). "True" tanar'ri such as the balors (originally called Balrogs) and the six-armed serpentine mariliths push other weaker tanar'ri around and organize them into makeshift armies for battle. Demon lords and demon princes such as Orcus, Demogorgon, Juiblex, Zuggtmoy, Graz'zt, and countless others are said to rule over the demons of their individual layers of the Abyss, as much as the chaotic demons can be ruled over.

==== Devils ====
The devils, of which the ruling type are called baatezu (/beɪˈɑːtɛzuː/), are lawful evil natives of the Nine Hells of Baator; they are said to subjugate the weak and rule tyrannically over their domains. Pit fiends are the most powerful baatezu, though even the strongest pit fiends are surpassed by the Lords of the Nine, or Archdevils, whose ranks include Baalzebul, Mephistopheles, and Asmodeus. Unlike the demons, the devils are described as arranged in a strict hierarchy. Like the demons, the devils are scheming backstabbers; while a demon only keeps its words when it is convenient for it, a devil keeps its word all too well—they are said to be used to exploiting repressive bureaucratic machinations to the fullest and thus always know all ways around the letter of a contract to begin with. The tanar'ri and the baatezu hold an eternal enmity for one another and wage the Blood War against one another.

==== Yugoloths ====
The yugoloths (called daemons in 1st edition D&D) are neutral evil natives of the Bleak Eternity of Gehenna and the Gray Wastes of Hades; they are neutral to the affairs of the other fiendish races, interfering only when they see a situation that may be profitable or a potential for the advancement of their own schemes. The yugoloths are portrayed as manipulative, secretive, and mercenary by nature, often acting as soldiers for deities in their own private wars, or even at times aiding both sides of the Blood War. In 4th Edition, the yugoloths are considered to be demons, and their previously standard naming convention of "loth" is replaced by "demon" (e.g. the Mezzoloth is the 4e Mezzodemon). In fifth edition, yugoloths are listed as neutral evil fiends under their original names.

==== Other fiends ====
===== Demodands =====
The demodands are race of evil fiends that live on the plane of Carceri (Tarterus in 1st edition D&D). Demodands were introduced in the 1st edition supplement Monster Manual II, renamed as gehreleths in the 2nd edition Monstrous Compendium Outer Planes Appendix, and reintroduced as demodands in the 3rd edition sourcebook Fiend Folio. In 1st edition D&D, the three types of demodands from weakest to strongest were tarry, slime, and shaggy. In 2nd and 3rd editions, the three types are farastu, kelubar, and shator. "The name (changed slightly from "Deodand" to "Demodand" to add a tie to the word "demon") and evil nature are taken from the Dying Earth series by Jack Vance, but everything else about them was created by TSR's writers."

===== Hordlings =====
The hordlings are fiends that form the hordes of the Gray Waste of Hades. They first appeared in the 1st edition supplement Monster Manual II. Hordlings wander the Gray Waste preying upon everything they come across, even other hordlings. Hordlings vary greatly in appearance. It is said that hordlings evolved from larvae whose hatred was so unique, their souls became individual. The hordlings can be summoned using an artifact known as the Bringer of Doom, which was created around the time of the Invoked Devastation of Greyhawk. Hordlings are the most common inhabitants of the Gray Waste. They also occasionally roam the other Lower Planes as well.

===== Kython =====
The kythons (not to be confused with kytons, which are a subtype of baatezu known as "chain devils") are distinct from the other fiends in that they did not originate on any of the lower planes. When a group of fiends (the Galchutt, from Monte Cook's Chaositech and Ptolus) were trapped on the Material Plane, they tried creating more of their own kind through magical means. The results were eyeless reptilian creatures with insectoid features and neutral evil traits. As the kythons matured, they took on varied forms. None of them were loyal to the fiends that created them. Because kythons originated on the Material Plane instead of the Abyss (or another lower plane), they are also called earth-bound demons. Kythons are only interested in eating and breeding. They have spread rapidly across the Material Plane. The current hierarchy of kythons, from the weakest to the strongest is: broodlings, juveniles, adults, impalers, slaymasters, and slaughterkings. Eventually, with more time, kythons will grow into newer and more powerful forms. Kythons closely resemble xenomorphs.

Cook considered renaming them to avoid confusion with "kytons".

===== Lycanthrope =====
Lycanthropes are humans able transform into animal form during night time. Every type has their own language and any humanoid bitten by a lycanthrope will be infected with the disease of lycanthropy. Types of lycanthropes include the werebear, wereboar, wererat, weretiger and werewolf.

===== Night hags =====
Night hags are fiends from the Gray Wastes of Hades that traffic in the souls of mortals in 3rd edition sources. In 5th edition they come from the Feywild and are exiled to the Gray Wastes of Hades.

===== Rakshasas =====
Rakshasas are fiends (often tiger-headed) that may have originated on Acheron according to 3rd edition sources. In 5th edition they originated in the Nine Hells.

===== Slaad =====
In the 4th edition game, Slaadi are chaotic evil and originate out of the Elemental Chaos. This is markedly different from the portrayal of Slaadi in all prior editions of the game, when they were chaotic neutral natives of Limbo and thus not fiends.

===== Half-fiends and fiendish creatures =====
The cambions (whose name comes from a different kind of mythological, demonic creature) are simply half-fiends; hybrids of fiends and non-fiendish creatures, often humans or other humanoids. Cambions are typically created through fiends raping mortals or seducing them after shape-shifting, although some of the most depraved beings actually participate willingly. Those cambions that actually survive birth typically look like grotesque, hellish variants of their mortal progenitors, having wings, claws, fangs and often many other features that reveal their fiendish origins. Cambions are usually outcast, being feared and hated in mortal societies for their fiendish origins and being derided by pure-blooded fiends for their impure heritage. A variant of cambion called durzagon is described in 3.5 edition of the Monster Manual II and is the hybrid of a devil and an unsuspecting duergar. The fiendish creatures are simply fiendish versions of other species in Dungeons & Dragons. They typically look like fearsome travesties of beings from the Material Plane. Most fiendish species are divided into a number of variants, usually in a hierarchy of increasing power and cunning.

===== Hecatoncheires =====
The hecatoncheires in the game is based on the creature with the same name from Greek mythology. Like their counterparts, D&D's hecatoncheires were presented as giants with one-hundred arms and fifty heads in early editions. They also had the ability to throw a whole "barrage of boulders" at their enemies. In later editions their description was changed to "abominations that are formed from the fusion of one-hundred beings." In another version they were reduced in power, appearing as "a mere four-armed giant". They were considered among the deadliest monsters of D&D by several reviewers. Marley King from Screen Rant recommended the hecatoncheires for Dungeons Masters to pit against high-level parties as a monster that is not "too cliché". He commented that - aside from the monster's many attacks, and high perception - it was given "incredible martial prowess" in the game, hearkening back to the importance of skill in battle in the culture it was taken from. Nicholas Montegriffo from The Gamer called them "worthy foes for epic heroes" and found the down-scaling of offensively usable arms sad.

==== Blood War ====
The Blood War concept was introduced as part of the new background for the outer planes in 1991's Monstrous Compendium Volume Outer Planes Appendix. The conflict is depicted as a bitter war of annihilation between the baatezu race and the tanar'ri; an absolute, all encompassing, and virtually eternal struggle. Trenton Webb of Arcane magazine wrote, "the fate of all the planes hangs on its outcome". The Blood War was thoroughly detailed in various books throughout the Planescape setting, particularly the 1996 boxed set Hellbound: The Blood War. The 4th edition of D&D's Manual of the Planes updated the Blood War into a smoldering cold war that was formerly an all-out war.

The Blood War has been given various causes across different game books. Fiendish Codex I: Hordes of the Abyss attributes it to an offshoot of the primordial battles between law and chaos, continued out of violent and sadistic stubbornness. Fiendish Codex II: Tyrants of the Nine Hells depicts Asmodeus as a formerly angelic being tasked with fighting an eternal war against the demons. When he and his followers take on demonic traits to better combat their foes, these angels, now deemed devils, are either exiled to or granted (depending on perspective) their own plane, where they fight the Blood War without disturbing the primordial lords of order. This is depicted as possibly being self-serving historical revisionism. The Guide to Hell instead portrays the Blood War as a distraction by Asmodeus to hide his true goal of usurping divine power and reshaping the multiverse. Later official materials claim Asmodeus possesses a piece of the pure elemental chaos Tharizdun used to create the Abyss. The demons are drawn to this and seek to reclaim it.

ComicBook.com contributor Christian Hoffer considered "Blood War between demons and devils" one "of the great conflicts that make up the D&D multiverse", while Bleeding Cool editor Gavin Sheehan called it "one of the most glorified battles in all of D&D" and praised the in-depth look into its cause and background given by a Ken Burns–style narrative in Mordenkainen's Tome of Foes. Black Gate reviewer Andrew Zimmerman Jones described it as the "eternal" conflict "for who gets claim on being more evil" and praised the Blood War as a background for adventures putting the player characters between the fronts.

==== Controversy and related changes between editions ====
The inclusion of demons and devils proved controversial among critics of Dungeons & Dragons. TSR eliminated most references to occult symbols, demons, and devils from the second edition of the game. When the creatures were reintroduced after a few year in the Monstrous Compendium supplement MC8: The Outer Planes, the terms "baatezu", "tanar'ri", "yugoloth", and "gehreleth" were introduced and were used exclusively in place of the terms "devil", "demon", "daemon", and "demodand", respectively, but without changing the creatures fundamentally.

Following a more relaxed attitude towards the hobby, Wizards of the Coast reinserted many of these excised references in the third edition of the game. They kept intact the terms they had been replaced with, using both when applicable to appeal both to older players and those who played in subsequent editions of the game. While the 1st edition of AD&D used the term "Daemon", all subsequent editions beginning with 2nd edition have used the term "yugoloth" for the same creatures.

==== Reception ====
Fiends were considered among the "standard repertoire of 'Monsters'" in the game by Fabian Perlini-Pfister. (Note: Fabian Perlini-Pfister uses the word "demon" instead of fiend, but uses "Asmodeus and succubi" as examples.) Black Gate reviewer Andrew Zimmerman Jones positively contrasted the extended description provided in Mordenkainen's Tome of Foes (2018) as compared to earlier material: "It's easy to treat demons and devils as villains just there to be killed, but after reading this chapter [on the Blood War], you'll be more inclined to treat them as unique creatures, with their own goals and motivations."

=== Tarrasque ===
The tarrasque is a gigantic lizard-like creature which exists only to eat, kill, and destroy, "the most dreaded monster native to the Prime Material plane". The tarrasque was introduced in 1983 in the Monster Manual II, in the first edition of Advanced Dungeons & Dragons. It is very loosely based upon the French legend of the tarasque.

It is very large, 50 feet (15 meters) tall and 70 feet (21 meters) long, and has a Tyrannosaurus rex–like form, although it is much more broad and muscular, with a differently shaped head, and with larger and more developed front arms. It has brown skin, with scabs and warts and bits of encrusted dung all over it which are grey in color. Protecting its back and tail is a thick, glossy caramel-colored shell or carapace. It has spikes coming from its chin, the sides of the mouth, the underside of its neck, the elbows of its front arms, and its shell. The creature also has two horns projecting forwards from the top of its head.

The tarrasque's skin is very hard and thick, and provides excellent armor. It is immune or resistant to most offensive magic, and regenerates damage quickly.

The second edition of the game included rules for extracting treasure from the creature's carcass. In the Spelljammer series, the accessory Practical Planetology suggests the tarrasques originate from the planet Falx. Several hundred tarrasques live there, where they feed upon the native Imbul, a lizard-like creature. In the 4th edition of the game, the tarrasque is listed as an "abomination" and classed as a "Gargantuan elemental magical beast"—a living engine of death and destruction created by a primordial race for use as a weapon against the gods.

The tarrasque has been called "a creature that embodies wanton destruction" and "singularly deadly" and been compared to a kaiju. It was ranked No. 2 on the list of the ten best high-level monsters in Dungeons and Dragons 4th Edition For Dummies. Rob Bricken from io9 named the tarrasque as the 10th most memorable D&D monster. Screen Rant compiled a list of the game's "10 Most Powerful (And 10 Weakest) Monsters, Ranked" in 2018, calling this one of the strongest, saying "There are a lot of giant monsters that roam the various Dungeons & Dragons worlds, but none is more feared than the Tarrasque. This creature is an engine of destruction and it can crush entire cities in a single rampage." Backstab reviewer Michaël Croitoriu highlights the tarrasque among the monsters rated upwards from 2nd to 3rd edition, and wishes good luck to the adventurers having the temerity to attack it. Inverse reviewer Corey Plante identified the tarrasque as the most powerful creature in the 5th edition of the game next to the aspects of Bahamut and Tiamat.

== See also ==
- Bestiary
- Dungeons & Dragons controversies
- List of Dungeons & Dragons monsters (1974–76)
- List of Dungeons & Dragons monsters (1977–94)
- List of Dungeons & Dragons 3rd edition monsters
- List of Dungeons & Dragons 4th edition monsters
- List of Dungeons & Dragons 5th edition monsters
- List of species in fantasy fiction
