= Outer Plane =

Plane of existence in Dungeons & Dragons

In the fantasy role-playing game Dungeons & Dragons, an Outer Plane is one of a number of general types of planes of existence. They can also be referred to as godly planes, spiritual planes, or divine planes. The Outer Planes are home to beings such as deities and their servants such as demons, celestials and devils. Each Outer Plane is usually the physical manifestation of a particular moral and ethical alignment and the entities that dwell there often embody the traits related to that alignment.

The intangible and esoteric Outer Planes—the realms of ideals, philosophies, and gods—stand in contrast to the Inner Planes, which compose the material building blocks of reality and the realms of energy and matter.

All Outer Planes are spatially infinite but are composed of features and locations of finite scope. Many of these planes are often split into a collection of further infinites called layers, which are essentially sub-planes that represent one particular facet or theme of the plane. For example, Baator's geography is reminiscent of Hell as depicted in Dante's The Divine Comedy. In addition, each layer may also contain a number of realms. Each realm is the home to an individual deity, and occasionally a collection of deities.

== Publication history ==
The Outer Planes were presented for the first time in Volume 1, Number 8 of The Dragon, released July 1977 as part of the Great Wheel of Planes. In the article "Planes: The Concepts of Spatial, Temporal and Physical Relationships in D&D", Gary Gygax mentions that there are 16 Outer Planes and describes the Seven Heavens, the Twin Paradises, and Elysium as "Typical higher planes", Nirvana as the "plane of ultimate Law" and Limbo as the "plane of ultimate Chaos (entropy)", and the Nine Hells, Hades' three glooms, and the 666 layers of the Abyss as "Typical lower planes". Other Outer Planes mentioned by name in the article include the Happy Hunting Grounds, Olympus, Gladsheim, Pandemonium, Tarterus, Gehenna, Acheron, and Arcadia.

The Outer Planes were further "refined in the Players Handbook (1978) and Deities & Demigods (1980)". The appendix of the Player's Handbook included an abstract diagram of the planes, and mentioned the same 16 Outer Planes: the Seven Heavens of absolute lawful good, the Twin Paradises of neutral good lawfuls, the planes of Elysium of absolute neutral good, the Happy Hunting Grounds of neutral good chaotics, the planes of Olympus of good chaotics, the planes of Gladsheim (Asgard, Valhalla, Vanaheim, etc.) of chaotic good neutrals, the planes of Limbo of neutral (absolute) chaos (entropy), the Planes of Pandemonium of chaotic evil neutrals, the 666 layers of the Abyss of absolute chaotic evil, the planes of Tarterus of evil chaotic neutrals, Hades' "Three Glooms" of absolute (neutral) evil, the furnaces of Gehenna of lawful evil neutrals, the Nine Hells of absolute lawful evil, the nether planes of Acheron of lawful evil neutrals, Nirvana of absolute (neutral) lawfuls, and the planes of Arcadia of neutral good lawfuls. Shannon Appelcline, the author of Designers & Dragons, highlighted that throughout the early 1980s Dragon magazine would continue to detail "some of the planes in more depth", however, "there was no overarching plan for the planes of D&D other than a few increasingly old drawings".

Both Appelcline and Curtis D. Carbonell, in his book the Dread Trident: Tabletop Role-Playing Games and the Modern Fantastic, highlighted that information on the planes and the shared cosmology was codified in the Manual of the Planes (1987) and Tales of the Outer Planes (1988). Carbonell wrote that project leader and designer Jeff Grubb detailed "the schematization of the planes' requisite five area: the Prime Material, the Ethereal, the Astral, the Inner, and the Outer planes. This basic structure is still used in 5e, with some changes that provide minor rearrangements and clarifications [...]. Grubb's approach demonstrated a need to codify, while still remaining flexible, that has remained as a primary aim of the latest edition".

Carbonell also highlighted that the 1989 Spelljammer campaign setting added cosmology that "allowed travel between the different settings" such as Dragonlance, Greyhawk, and the Forgotten Realms. However, campaign settings such as Dark Sun and Ravenloft were inaccessible in this cosmology. Then in 1993, TSR wanted to do a series of books about the Outer Planes. Zeb Cook, creator of the Planescape universe, describes it this way:

So there was this huge collection of over ten years of stuff that was just kind of quietly ignored with no sense of logic to it, and we figured that 'Oh, we don't need to explain it—it's enough to say "It came from The Outer Planes."' So [one of the TSR designers] said, 'Let's do this series of books, one about each Plane,' which would have been about 10 million books, so TSR said, 'Well, that's a good idea, but 10 million books is not such a great idea. We'd rather create a campaign world that's set in the Outer Planes,' because they had figured out by that point that worlds sold. And so they came to me, the senior designer with a huge gaping hole in my schedule, and wanted me to take this idea and execute it. 'Make us a campaign world that's completely different from all of the ones we have....'

Carbonell called the 1994 Planescape campaign setting "the most complex example of the multiverse created during the varieties of 2e's AD&D settings" and wrote: "A more nuanced and sophisticated attempt at harmonization, Planescape provided an alternate way to travel between the planes than Spelljammer's science-fantasy-oriented approach". The 3rd edition Manual of the Planes (2001) detailed both the inner and outer planes. Kevin Kulp, for DMs Guild, wrote that "the authors used an approach that said 'here's how it's been done in the past, and here are other ways you can do it,' which allowed the book to avoid setting planar mechanics in stone. Instead it gave DMs a modular approach by presenting Options, a flexible strategy that pleased both 1e and Planescape fans. Vast amounts of new ideas and new locations were presented, dovetailing nicely with canon from earlier editions".

The 4th edition Manual of the Planes (2008) shifted the locations of the various Outer Planes to fit the new World Axis cosmology. However, the 5th edition Player's Handbook (2014) and Dungeon Master's Guide (2014) shifted most of the cosmology of the planes back to the Great Wheel model with some aspects of the World Axis model retained in the descriptions of the inner planes.

== Standard D&D cosmology ==
The 'Great Wheel' model of the planes, as described in the 5th edition Player's Handbook

The standard Dungeons & Dragons (D&D) cosmology contains sixteen Outer Planes. This cosmology is outlined in the Great Wheel model where the Outer Planes are arranged in a ring of sixteen planes with the Good-aligned planes (or Upper Planes) at the top, and the Evil-aligned planes (or Lower Planes) at the bottom. Depictions usually display the Lawful planes (or Planes of Law) to the left, and the Chaotic planes (or Planes of Chaos) to the right. Between all of these sit the Neutral planes, or the Planes of Conflict. The center contains the Inner and Material Planes.

One further plane sits in the center of the ring, the Outlands, being neutral in alignment. At the center of the Outlands is a Spire of infinite height; the city of Sigil floats above the Spire's pinnacle.

This D&D cosmology is the standard cosmology in the 3rd and 5th Editions and is the official cosmology used in campaign settings such as Planescape and Greyhawk. "It's common for gods from different campaign settings to share a plane but maintain their own space. Mount Celestia, for example, houses both Heironeous from Greyhawk and Torm from the Forgotten Realms". Many of the alternative names derive from the 1st-edition Manual of the Planes (1987), and the in-game explanation given in the Planescape setting is that these names are used by the "Clueless", or characters from the Prime Material unfamiliar with the planes.

Outer Planes
Mount; Celestia	Bytopia	Elysium	Beastlands	Arborea
Arcadia	↑Good↑			Ysgard
Mechanus	←Lawful	Outlands	Chaotic→	Limbo
Acheron	↓Evil↓			Pandemonium
Nine Hells of Baator	Gehenna	Hades	Carceri	Abyss

=== 4th Edition differences ===
The 4th Edition World Axis model outlines that the mortal world is between "the Astral Sea above and the Elemental Chaos below". Most of the Outer Planes are now located in the Astral Sea (such as Celestia and the Nine Hells). The Abyss is an exception; it is now located in the Elemental Chaos.

== Cosmology in campaign settings ==
Other Dungeons & Dragons cosmologies were developed after Greyhawk for various other campaign settings, however, "they would be subsumed under 5e's umbrella concept of the multiverse".

=== Forgotten Realms cosmology ===
The Forgotten Realms cosmology was originally the same as that of a standard Dungeons & Dragons campaign. The cosmology for the 3rd edition of D&D was altered substantially so that it contained twenty-six Outer Planes, arranged in a tree-like structure around the central 'trunk' of the material plane of Toril. Unlike the Outer Planes of the standard D&D cosmology which were heavily alignment-based, the Outer Planes of the Forgotten Realms cosmology were faith-based.

The planes of the Forgotten Realms were retooled in the 4th Edition to match the new default cosmology, with many of the planes or realms being relocated to the Astral Sea, and a handful now located in the Elemental Chaos. Appelcline highlighted that the 4th Edition World Axis model "had actually originated with the Forgotten Realms, which was planning a view of the heavens as early as 2005 or 2006. It was then co-opted by the SCRAMJET world design team for D&D 4e".

The Barrens of Doom and Despair plane is designed to be inhospitable to Dungeons & Dragons player characters. Even though there is little light or water, other characters from the franchise can be found here. Five deities make their homes here, including Bane (his home was previously referred to as Acheron), Beshaba, Hoar, Loviatar, and Talona. The Barrens of Doom and Despair consist of a single infinite plane, with no constituent layers. It links via the Astral Plane to the planes of the Prime Material (such as Toril) and a number of portals directly connect it with Hammergrim and the Blood Rift. Beshaba's realm, the Blood Tor, links directly to the Abyss.

==== List of Forgotten Realms planes ====
- The Abyss
- Arvandor
- The Barrens of Doom and Despair
- Blood Rift
- Brightwater
- Clangor
- Deep Caverns
- The Demonweb Pits
- Dragon Eyrie
- Dwarfhome
- Dweomerheart
- The Fated Depths
- Fury's Heart
- The Gates of the Moon
- Golden Hills
- Green Fields
- Hammergrim
- Heliopolis
- The House of Knowledge
- The House of Nature
- The House of the Triad
- Jotunheim
- The Nine Hells
- Nishrek
- The Supreme Throne
- Warrior's Rest

=== Eberron cosmology ===
The Eberron cosmology, used in the original Eberron campaign setting, contained thirteen Outer Planes in 3rd edition, and gained at least two for 4th edition under the new cosmology. They exhibit traits similar to those of the standard D&D cosmology but also some (Irian, Mabar, Fernia, and Risia) appear more like Inner Planes. The cosmology was unique in that the Outer Planes orbited around Eberron through the Astral plane. As they orbited, their overlap with the material plane changed and access to those planes became easier or restricted.

Like most other D&D campaign settings, in 3rd edition D&D Eberron has a number of planes. Besides the Prime Material Plane, the Ethereal Plane, the Plane of Shadow, and the Astral Plane, the Eberron Campaign Setting has thirteen relatively unique planes. Gates or portals to any of the planes are very rare. These thirteen planes metaphysically orbit around Eberron, and depending on their current location are considered in one of four states.

- Waxing/Waning – The plane is either approaching or moving away from Eberron. Planar travel occurs as normal.
- Coterminous – The plane actually touches Eberron, and certain effects are strengthened in Eberron. Also, it may be possible to travel between planes by going to an appropriate spot. For example, when Risia, the Plain of Ice is coterminous, one may enter the plane from Eberron by walking into a blizzard. Because of seals placed by the Gatekeeper druids, Xoriat, the Realm of Madness, is incapable of becoming coterminous with Eberron.
- Remote – The plane is furthest from Eberron, and certain effects are weakened in Eberron. Also, reaching a remote plane with the spell plane shift is difficult and requires a high DC check. Because of the conflict between the Quori and the giants of Xen'drik, Dal Quor is always considered remote from Eberron.

==== List of Eberron planes ====
Name	Alignment	Enhanced magic	Impeded magic	Coterminous / Remote / Orbit
Daanvi, the Perfect Order	Law (strong)	Lawful	Chaotic	100 years / 100 years / 400 years
Dal Quor, the Region of Dreams	None	Illusion	None	never / always / off orbit
Dolurrh, the Realm of the Dead	None	None	All	1 year / 1 year / 100 years
Fernia, the Sea of Fire	Evil	Fire	Cold	1 month / 1 month / 5 years
Irian, the Eternal Day	None	Positive energy	Negative energy	10 days / 10 days / 3 years
Kythri, the Churning Chaos	Chaos (strong)	Chaotic	Lawful	erratic / erratic / erratic
Lamannia, the Twilight Forest	None	Druidic	None	7 days / 7 days / 1 year
Mabar, the Endless Night	None	Negative energy	Positive energy	3 days / 5 days / 5 years
Risia, the Plane of Ice	Evil	Cold	Fire	1 month / 1 month / 5 years
Shavarath, the Battleground	Varies	Weapon-related	Pacifying, charms	1 year / unknown / 36 years
Syrania, the Azure Sky	Good (strong)	Good	Evil	1 day / 1 day / 10 years
Thelanis, the Faerie Court	None	Arcane	None	7 years / 14 years / 225 years
Xoriat, the Realm of Madness	Evil	None	None	unknown / unknown / millennia

== Fictional descriptions ==
=== List of planes ===
Name	Alternative Name(s)	Alignment	Description	Notable native inhabitants
Elysium	Blessed Fields	Neutral Good	The plane of peace and unadulterated goodness.	Guardinals: noble immortal humanoids with bestial features; Pelor: The sun-deity
The Beastlands	Happy Hunting Grounds	Neutral Good/Chaotic good	The plane of idealized nature.	Animal lords: archetypal rulers of the various animal species; Ehlonna: Goddess of forests
Arborea	Arvandor, Olympus, Olympian Glades	Chaotic good	Fey realm of passion, abundance and nature's caprice.	Eladrin and The Court of Stars; Titans and gods of Greek mythology; The Seldarine pantheon of Elven gods
Ysgard	Asgard, Gladsheim, Heroic Domains	Chaotic neutral/Chaotic good	The eternal battleground where true heroes prove their valor.	Gods of Norse mythology; Kord: God of strength; Olidammara: God of rogues
Limbo	Plane of Ever-Changing Chaos	Chaotic neutral	An alien, anarchistic and unpredictable plane.	Slaad: frog-like creatures; Githzerai: human-like monks
Pandemonium	Plane of Windswept Depths	Chaotic evil/Chaotic neutral	An infinite network of pitch-black catacombs, with winds that drive men mad.	Erythnul: God of hate and slaughter
The Abyss	Plane of Infinite Layers	Chaotic evil	Evil lands of shocking perversity and unpredictable horror.	Tanar'ri Demons: Mortal enemies of the Baatezu; Obyrith Demons: Lovecraftian ancestors to the Tanar'ri; Loumara Demons:Newest race of demons born by the dying dreams of evil gods; Lolth: Spider Goddess of the Drow; Demogorgon: Beastly Prince of Demons; Graz'zt : The Dark Prince of Demons; Orcus: The Demon Lord of the Undead; Iggwilv: Witch Queen of Perrenland, Mother of Demigod Iuz. Infamous author of the blasphemous Demonomicon. The true identity of Tasha, member of the infamous adventuring group known as the Company of Seven.
Carceri	Tarterus, Tartarus	Neutral evil/Chaotic evil	Liars, cheats and traitors are imprisoned here by their own deceptions.	Nerull: God of murder and darkness; Titans exiled from Olympus; Demodands (Gehreleth); Yugoloths: presence largely confined to Othrys
The Gray Waste	Hades	Neutral evil	Here, all emotion and compassion is drained away, until only hopelessness, selfishness and apathy remain as baatezu and tanar'ri meet and clash in a colorless expanse.	Yugoloths (Daemons); Tanar'ri and Baatezu fight the Blood War on this plane; Abbathor: God of dwarven greed.; Grey Sisters (Night Hags); Hades: Greek god of death and the underworld. Believed to be the most powerful deity on the plane.; Hel/ Hela: Norse goddess of death.; Mydianchlarus: Current Oinoloth of Khin-Oin.; Hordlings
Gehenna	Plane of Bleak Eternity	Neutral evil/Lawful evil	Volcanic realm of evil schemes and merciless cliffs.	Yugoloths (Daemons)
Baator	Hell; The Nine Hells	Lawful evil	A realm of oppression, torment, and diabolical plots.	Baatezu (Devils): mortal enemies of the Tanar'ri; Tiamat: The Chromatic Dragon; Kurtulmak: God of Kobolds; Asmodeus: Lord of the Ninth. Previously believed to have used the name Satan as one of numerous aliases.
Acheron	The Infernal Battlefield	Lawful neutral/Lawful evil	A plane of constant, pointless war, where identity is forever lost.	Gods of the goblins and orcs, such as Gruumsh and Maglubiyet; Wee Jas: Goddess of death and magic; Hextor: God of Tyranny
Mechanus	Nirvana	Lawful neutral	This clockwork plane is the ultimate in order; scholars and constructs live here.	Modrons, orderly geometrically shaped beings; Inevitables, mechanical enforcers of all law
Arcadia	The Land of Perfect Order, Plane of Peaceable Kingdoms	Lawful neutral/Lawful good	A peaceful world of wildlands and kingdoms where all live in harmony.	Saint Cuthbert: God of Retribution and Common Sense
Mount Celestia	The Seven Heavens	Lawful good	Countless paladins and saints have ascended here.	Aasimons, Archons and Devas; Bahamut: The Platinum Dragon; Heironeous: God of Valor; Moradin: God of Dwarves; Yondalla: Goddess of Halflings
Bytopia	Twin Paradises	Neutral good/Lawful good	Gnomes and other industrious folk dwell here.	Garl Glittergold and other Gods of the Gnomes
The Outlands	Plane of Concordant Opposition	True Neutral	The plane between all other Outer Planes.	Rilmani: Metallic skinned humanoids; Boccob: God of Magic; Obad-Hai: God of Nature; The Lady of Pain: Protector of Sigil

=== Abyss ===
The Abyss is known for having hundreds of layers, and many realms of deities and demons, including its horrific first layer of Pazunia (also known as the Plane of Infinite Portals), and the White Kingdom ruled by the King of Ghouls.

In a critical review of Planes of Chaos for White Wolf Inphobia magazine, Keith H. Eisenbeis described the danger of adventuring in planes such as the Abyss, especially for low- and mid-level characters: "Sure, it's possible to design a situation in which first-level characters can accomplish something important and survive in the Abyss, but the immensity and power of the planes is undermined. In addition, on planes such as the Abyss, negotiating with evil creatures is frequently necessary, possibly making these planes useful to only neutral and evil characters."

Ken Denmead of Wired described a number of aspects of the Abyss as psychedelic, calling the doors on one layer of the Abyss similar to the "loony corridor scene from Sgt. Pepper's Lonely Heart Club Band."

=== Acheron ===
Acheron (/ˈætʃərən/ ATCH-ər-ən), also known as The Infernal Battlefield of Acheron, is a lawful neutral/lawful evil–aligned plane of existence.

=== Arborea ===
Arborea or more fully, the Olympian Glades of Arborea, is a chaotic good-aligned plane of existence. It is one of a number of alignment-based Outer Planes that form part of the standard Dungeons & Dragons (D&D) cosmology, used in the Planescape, Greyhawk and some editions of the Forgotten Realms campaign settings.

Arborea is also referred to as "Olympus" or "Arvandor", though technically those names describe separate realms within the plane. Arborea is stylised as a peaceful plane of natural beauty with a multitude of thriving environments. Much of the plane is dominated by vast tall forests, but also includes glades of wildflowers and fields of grain. As a plane that also embodies chaos, it has a wild and often sudden nature. The weather can change drastically at short notice, changing from warm sunshine to raging winds and back again in just a few minutes.

==== Publication history ====
The plane known as Olympus was mentioned for the first time by name in the article "Planes: The Concepts of Spatial, Temporal and Physical Relationships in D&D", in The Dragon #8, released July 1977. The plane was mentioned again in an appendix of the known planes of existence in the original (1st edition) AD&D Players Handbook, published in June 1978, where it was described as "The planes of Olympus of absolute good chaotics".

==== Inhabitants ====
The eladrin, powerful elf-like celestial creatures are the protectors of Arborea, the most common of which is the Ghaele. Lillends are also common on the plane. Many types of celestial and anarchic version of common animals, natural creatures suffused with tendencies of good or chaos, are found in Arborea. Also, primitive Orc-Baboon hybrids known as Losels dwell in its wilderness, occasionally migrating between it and the Beastlands.

Arborea has two main types of petitioner, the first of which are the spirits of the elven dead. Some take the form of celestial creatures or others simply merge with the plane itself, as a final reward after death. The second main type are the bacchae, drunken revellers who perpetually indulge in wild celebrations, enticing visitors to join with them.

==== Structure ====
As an outer plane, Arborea is spatially infinite, further consisting of three infinite layers (or sub-planes). Arborea's first layer shares borders with the neighbouring planes of the Heroic Domains of Ysgard and the Wilderness of the Beastlands; travel is possible between Arborea and these planes at certain locations.

==== Layers ====
The wandering realm of the Seelie Court often appears on the plane of Arborea, always in a different location.

Arborea has three layers:

Arvandor/Olympus

In previous editions, this layer was known as Olympus, but the most recent edition of Manual of the Planes refers to it only as Arvandor. Principally, it is the home plane of the Seldarine, the good Elven deities, headed by Corellon Larethian. This layer is mostly endless canopies of forest with huge clearings containing many idealized elven settlements. Arvandor has a day and night cycle matching that of the material plane. The goddess Eilistraee also resides in the forests of Arvandor, despite her banishment.

The realm of Brightwater, a separate plane in the third edition Forgotten Realms cosmology is located on Arvandor. Four goddesses have domains here, including Lliira, Sharess, Sune, and Tymora.

The actual realm of Olympus is found here, and is home to many deities of the Greek pantheon, including Zeus, Aphrodite, Apollo, Ares, Artemis, Athena, Demeter, Dionysus, Hephaestus, Hera, Hermes, and the titan Rhea.

There are several other realms located on this layer, including:

- The aarakocra goddess Syranita's realm of Whistledge;
- The giant goddess Iallanis's realm of Florallium;
- Trithereon's realm of The Forking Road;
- Chih-Nii's realm of Loom of the Celestial River.

Aquallor/Ossa

When not with the Seldarine, Deep Sashelas also has his own realm of Elavandor on Ossa.

Poseidon's realm of Caletto can be found on Ossa.

Mithardir/Pelion

Nephthys has her realm of Amun-thys on Pelion.

==== Historic influences ====
Arborea incorporates many elements of Greek mythology, with the game's version of Mount Olympus as a central feature, to the point that the whole plane was originally named Olympus in 1st edition. The name of Arborea, introduced in 2nd edition AD&D, is derived from its "endless rolling forests", as in arboreal.

=== Arcadia ===
Arcadia (/ɑːrˈkeɪdiə/ ar-KAY-dee-ə) or more fully, the Peaceable Kingdoms of Arcadia, is a lawful neutral/lawful good-aligned plane of existence.

=== Baator ===
Baator, also known as the Nine Hells of Baator or the Nine Hells, is a lawful evil–aligned plane of existence.

Baator is stylised as a plane of sinister evil and cruelty. The different types of devils that dwell here obey a strict hierarchical caste-like social structure. Each continually plots to advance their position through treachery and deception. Unlike the demons of the Abyss, the devils are highly organized, with a logical and calculating nature.

The plane itself is composed of nine different layers, each of which models a differing but no less inhospitable and dreadful environment, from barren plains of ash and rock to frozen wastes of endless ice.

The nine layers in order are Avernus, Dis, Minauros, Phlegethos, Stygia, Malbolge, Maladomini, Cania and Nessus.

==== Publication history ====
The plane known as the Nine Hells was mentioned for the first time by name in the article "Planes: The Concepts of Spatial, Temporal and Physical Relationships in D&D", in The Dragon #8, released July 1977. In the article Gary Gygax describes the plane as one of the "Typical lower planes". The plane was mentioned again in an appendix of the known planes of existence in the original (1st edition) AD&D Players Handbook, published in June 1978, where it was described as "The Nine Hells of absolute lawful evil".

==== History ====
The article "The Politics of Hell" by Alexander Von Thorn in Dragon No. 28 (1979) describes how Hell was originally ruled by Satan, who was usurped by Baalzebul, who was in turn overthrown by Asmodeus.

The article "The Possessors" by Arn Ashleigh Parker in Dragon No. 42 (October 1980) follows up on this article by explaining that Selm, a lieutenant of Satan, was made the Prince of Possessors, and remained in that position throughout these various changes in the administration in Hell.

=== Beastlands ===
The Beastlands (more properly, the Wilderness of the Beastlands, formerly the Happy Hunting Grounds in early versions of the game) is a neutral (chaotic) good-aligned plane of existence.

=== Bytopia ===
Bytopia, also known as the Twin Paradises, (bi- + utopia) or, more fully, the Twin Paradises of Bytopia, is a lawful good/neutral good aligned plane of existence. It is one of a number of alignment-based Outer Planes that form part of the standard Dungeons & Dragons (D&D) cosmology, used in the Planescape, Greyhawk, and some editions of the Forgotten Realms campaign settings. Bytopia is a virtuous plane of cultivated beauty, and is home to many of the deities of the gnomish pantheon.

==== Publication history ====
The plane known as the Twin Paradises was mentioned for the first time by name in the article "Planes: The Concepts of Spatial, Temporal and Physical Relationships in D&D", in The Dragon #8, released July 1977. In the article Gary Gygax describes the plane as one of the "Typical higher planes". The plane was mentioned again in an appendix of the known planes of existence in the original (1st edition) AD&D Players Handbook, published in June 1978, where it was described as "The Twin Paradises of neutral good lawfuls".

==== Structure ====
Bytopia is a spatially infinite plane, consisting of two layers or sub-planes. It is unique in the sense that the two layers are laid facing one another, each looking down (or up; the terms are relative here) at the other. A traveller can look up from one layer and see someone on the other layer above them looking back down (or, from the other side's perspective, up), provided that the sky is clear. To get from one layer to the other, travellers must either climb tall mountains, or fly. Gravity reverses when someone reaches the middle point between the two layers. Bytopia shares its borders with the neighbouring planes of the Seven Mounting Heavens of Celestia and the Blessed Fields of Elysium; travel is possible between Bytopia and these planes at certain locations.

Dothion is a serene pastoral layer of meadows and wild-flowers; it is home to the souls of farmers, craftsmen, honest merchants, and gnomish commoners. The Golden Hills, a separate plane in the 3rd-Edition Forgotten Realms cosmology, is located here, and is home to the gnome deity Garl Glittergold, as well as Baervan Wildwanderer, Baravar Cloakshadow, Flandal Steelskin, Gaerdal Ironhand, Nebelun the Meddler, and Segojan Earthcaller. Flandal shares his Mithral Forge with Ama-Tsu-Mara. The godly realms of Deephome, home of Callarduran Smoothhands, god of the svirfneblin, and Prosperity, realm of Inari, are also located on Dothion.

Shurrock is the mountainous untamed twin, home of hidden beasts and monsters. The gnomish underground mining city of Quarry that specialises in gemcutting is located here. Rangers often foray into this wilderness to slay creatures that have threatened the folk of Dothion.

A number of godly realms exist on this layer, including Heart of Justice, realm of Kiri-Jolith, and Windwrath, realm of Tefnut. Martyrdomain was the realm of Ilmater in previous editions of Dungeons & Dragons.

=== Carceri ===
Carceri (more fully, the Tarterian Depths of Carceri; also, Tarterus or The Red Prison) is a neutral (chaotic) evil-aligned plane of existence.

=== Elysium ===
Elysium, or more fully, the Blessed Fields of Elysium, is a strongly good-aligned plane of existence.

=== Gehenna ===
Gehenna (beginning in the third edition of the game, the Bleak Eternity of Gehenna; also, The Fourfold Furnaces or The Fires of Perdition) is a plane of existence of neutral evil/lawful evil alignment. It is one of a number of alignment-based Outer Planes that form part of the standard Dungeons & Dragons (D&D) cosmology. It borders the Gray Waste of Hades and the Nine Hells of Baator.

=== Gray Waste of Hades ===
The Gray Waste (more fully, the Gray Wastes of Hades; also, Hades, The Three Glooms, Hope's Loss or The Nadir) is a strongly neutral evil aligned plane of existence. It is one of a number of alignment-based Outer Planes that form part of the standard Dungeons & Dragons (D&D) cosmology, used in the Planescape, Greyhawk, and some editions of the Forgotten Realms campaign settings. Hades is the plane of origin of the yugoloth daemons. Pathfinder's analogue to Hades is the plane called Abaddon (from the Hebraic Abaddon).

==== Publication history ====
The plane known as Hades was mentioned for the first time by name in the article "Planes: The Concepts of Spatial, Temporal and Physical Relationships in D&D", in The Dragon #8, released July 1977. In the article Gary Gygax describes the plane as Hades' three glooms, one of the "Typical lower planes". The plane was mentioned again in an appendix of the known planes of existence in the original (1st edition) AD&D Players Handbook, published in June 1978, where it was described as "Hades' "Three Glooms" of absolute (neutral) evil".

==== Description ====
According to Trenton Webb's critical review of Planes of Conflict for British RPG magazine Arcane, the Gray Waste "erodes the sense of purpose that is the hallmark of an alignment-based philosophy. One symptom of this is the place's ability to fade the colour from a character's clothes!" Stang and Trammell called Hades "the realm of the dead", where larvae created by night hags are used as currency.

=== Limbo ===
Limbo or more fully, the Ever-Changing Chaos of Limbo, is a chaotic neutral-aligned plane of existence.

The plane known as Limbo was mentioned for the first time by name in the article "Planes: The Concepts of Spatial, Temporal and Physical Relationships in D&D", in The Dragon #8, released July 1977. In the article Gary Gygax describes the plane as the "plane of ultimate Chaos (entropy)". The plane was mentioned again in an appendix of the known planes of existence in the original Advanced Dungeons & Dragons (AD&D) Players Handbook, published in June 1978, where it was described as "The planes of Limbo of neutral (absolute) chaos (entropy)".

Limbo is described as a place of pure chaos where everything is in constant motion and change, especially the landscape, which can shift unpredictably and randomly rolls over upon itself like liquid. Very few places in Limbo are stable enough for normal travel.

Limbo is home to the slaadi and their lords (most notably Ygorl and Ssendam), and to the githzerai. Very few gods call Limbo home, as the plane is not well-suited to any sort of permanent structures. The shared realm of Tempus and the Red Knight can be found on Limbo, as can Shaundakul's realm. The elven god Fenmarel Mestarine calls this chaotic plane home as well.

The plane of Limbo is the location of a number of godly realms:

- The elven god Fenmarel Mestarine's realm of Fennimar.
- Indra, Vayu, and Agni's realm of Swarga.
- Llerg's realm of Beasthaven.
- Procan's realm of Seasedge.
- Ralishaz's realm of The Kiss of Luck.
- Shaundakul's realm of Shaunadaur.
- Shina-Tsu-Hiko's realm of Windshome.
- Sirrion's realm of The Flame Void.
- Tempus and the Red Knight's shared realm of Knight's Rest.
- Susanoo's realm of The Globe of Raging Chaos.

Fauna include the Chaos dragon.

Limbo is named after the Limbo of Catholic mythology, where the souls of the dead who died before Jesus's death went, before he descended there to release them, but there is little similarity of philosophy between the two realms. In appearance, it is based on the Abyss in John Milton's Paradise Lost.

=== Mechanus ===
Mechanus, also known as The Clockwork Nirvana of Mechanus (or simply Nirvana in AD&D 1st Edition) is a purely lawful aligned plane of existence.

=== Mount Celestia ===
Mount Celestia or more fully, the Seven Mounting Heavens of Celestia, or even the Seven Heavens is a lawful good-aligned plane of existence.

The seven layers in order are Lunia, Mercuria, Venya, Solania, Mertion, Jovar, and Chronias.

=== Outlands ===
The Concordant Domain of the Outlands, also known as the Concordant Opposition, is the Outer Plane where the souls of people of Neutral alignment are sent after death. It is popular as a meeting place for treaties between the powers. The Outlands are also home to the gate-towns. Located centrally in the Outlands is the Spire, atop which Sigil can be seen. The Outlands are the home plane of the neutral-minded rilmani. The Outlands are part of a series of rings that form the multiverse. Travel between the planes of the Outlands is accomplished via The Great Road.

In first edition and second edition AD&D before Planescape, this plane is also located centrally to the Outer Planes and known by its original name Concordant Opposition. The First Edition Manual Of Planes states that the center of the plane takes various forms at different times (a mountain, a huge tree, etc.) and godly powers are lost as one moves toward the center, as well as spells, beginning with the highest levels of spells at the farthest out and then gradually losing the lower ones step by step the further one moves inward. Within 100 miles (160 km) of the center, not even chemical reactions take place, and neither man nor deity can get closer than 100 miles (160 km). In Second Edition Outer Planes Monstrous Compendium, under the description of the Mediators of Nirvana (Mechanus), it states that this plane was originally intended for Neutral Powers (deities) and created by the Powers (deities) of creation, but each Neutral Deity asserted their individual influence causing it to become unbalanced, then were cast out by the powers of creation. It also states that three lights of balance exist at the center of the plane, one for each Mediator in Nirvana. (Mechanus) Before Planescape, there is also no mention whatsoever of Sigil being at the Center of the Plane.

Gate-towns are settlements which are built around a permanent portal to a certain Outer Plane on the Great Wheel. Gate-towns are important strategically because they provide a (relatively) stable way to enter a desired Outer Plane. The gate-towns reflect the plane that they lead to, for example, Xaos (or aXos, soaX, etc.) is a town where everything changes from one moment to the next. Even the location of the portal to Limbo changes every day – not that there's any regularity to daybreak and nightfall in Xaos. The character of Xaos mirrors what the plane of Limbo is like.

==== Realms ====
The Outlands is the location of a number of godly realms, including the following:

- The Caverns of Thought, realm of the illithid deity Ilsensine
- The Court of Light, realm of the naga deity Shekinester
- The Flowering Hill, the realm of the halfling goddess Sheela Peryroyl
- Gzemnid's Realm, home of the beholder deity of gases and vapors
- The Hidden Realm, home of the chief giant deity Annam
- The Hidden Vale, realm of the Dragonlance god Gilean
- The Hidden Wood, realm of the nature god Obad-Hai
- The Library of Lore, realm of the god Boccob
- The Mausoleum of Chronepsis, realm of the dragon deity Chronepsis
- The Marketplace Eternal, realm of the god Zilchus
- The Palace of Judgement, Yen-Wang-Yeh's realm
- The Scales of Wealth, the realm of Shinare
- Semuanya's Bog, realm of the lizardfolk deity Semuanya
- The Steel Hills, realm of the goddess Ulaa
- Thoth's Estate, the realm of Thoth
- Tvashtri's Laboratory, realm of the Indian god of artifice
- The Web of Fate, realm of the goddess Istus
- The Well of Urd, realm of the Norns
- Wonderhome, realm of Gond

Three dwarven gods, (Vergadain, Dugmaren Brightmantle, and Dumathoin) share the realm of The Dwarven Mountain on the plane of the Outlands.

The Celtic gods (Daghdha, Diancecht, Goibhniu, Lugh, Manannan mac Lir, Oghma, and Silvanus) share the realm of Tír na nÓg on the Outlands.

=== Pandemonium ===
Pandemonium (or, the Windswept Depths of Pandemonium) is the Outer plane where Chaotic Evil and Chaotic Neutral petitioners are sent after death. Pandemonium is a large, complex cavern that never ends. Compounding this problem, howling winds drive most of its residents mad. There are few creatures that are native to this plane; those individuals who do live there usually have no choice in the matter.

Pandemonium had four layers named Pandesmos, Cocytus, Phlegethon and Agathion.

=== Ysgard ===
Ysgard is the Outer Plane of Chaotic Neutral / Chaotic Good alignment. It is also called Asgard, Gladsheim or The Heroic Domains.

== Reception ==
Backstab magazine reviewer Lord Winfield characterized the Outer Planes as the place where most of the major powers of the setting are found, and the part of Planescape which has the most potential for exploration by the player characters.

== General references ==
- Baker, Richard; Wyatt, James (2004). Player's Guide to Faerûn. Wizards of the Coast. ISBN 0-7869-3134-5.
- Baker, Keith (2004). Eberron Campaign Setting. Wizards of the Coast. ISBN 0-7869-3274-0.
- Cook, David. Player's Handbook (TSR, 1989).
- Grubb, Jeff. Manual of the Planes (TSR, 1987).
- Grubb, Jeff, David Noonan, and Bruce Cordell. Manual of the Planes (Wizards of the Coast, 2001).
- Redman, Rich, Skip Williams, and James Wyatt. Deities and Demigods (Wizards of the Coast, 2002).
