= Planes of Chaos =

Role-playing game boxed set

- Genre: Role-playing game
- Publisher: TSR
- Media type: Boxed set

Planes of Chaos was a boxed set for the Planescape campaign setting of the Dungeons & Dragons fantasy role-playing game.

== Contents ==
Planes of Chaos is a boxed set supplement for the Planescape campaign setting which describes the five Outer Planes of chaotic alignment: Arborea, Ysgard, Limbo, Pandemonium, and the Abyss. The expansion boxed set includes the "Travelogue," a 48-page guide for players; "The Book of Chaos," a 128-page book intended for the Dungeon Master; "Chaos Adventures," a 32-page book which outlines 15 adventures, three for each of the planes detailed in the set; a 32-page "Monstrous Supplement" with statistics for 15 new monsters; and one poster for each plane.

The set's four volumes, spanning some 240 pages, reveal the secrets of the spectre wars of airless Naratyr, describe an elven city concealed in the limbs of Grandfather Oak, and explore the Infinite Staircase of Ysgard that winds through all time and space. A text-packed poster map summarizes dozens of the layers of Abyss.

== Publication history ==
Planes of Chaos was designed by Lester Smith and Wolfgang Baur, and was published by TSR. The box cover art was by Robh Ruppel, with conceptual and booklet cover art by Dana Knutson, and interior art by Tony DiTerlizzi. The set was released in 1994.

== Reception ==
Rick Swan reviewed Planes of Chaos for Dragon magazine #214 (February 1995). He commented on the set: "Of the various subdivisions of the AD&D game cosmology, the chaotic planes are arguably the most interesting and potentially the most disappointing. For years, we've been assured that Limbo, the Abyss, and Pandemonium are mind-blowing locales teeming with adventure possibilities. But in the absence of hard information—anyone recall seeing a Pandemonium source book?—we've had to take these assurances on faith. This dazzling Planescape setting boxed set exceeds expectations." Swan concluded by saying that "With crisp prose and vivid descriptions, Smith and Baur not only have captured the settings eerie majesty, but have done so in astonishing detail."

Keith H. Eisenbeis reviewed Planes of Chaos for White Wolf magazine, rating it a 2 out of 5 overall. He felt that while the art on most of the recent TSR products was a most attractive feature, the art of Planes of Chaos was "relatively abundant but uninspired and simplistic" and that the color sides of the map posters were too abstract. He also found the constant insertion of the setting's fictional slang terms irritating. He also found it disappointing that the authors seemed to have purposely pulled the product away from historical mythology in many cases, despite the wealth of material available to draw on from real-world mythology and previous D&D works. Eisenbeis did find that the alterations of the core rules for magic and combat on each plane were easy to understand and use, but cautioned that the task of running a balanced long-term campaign may be difficult. He noted that the essentially immutable nature of the planes – given that each plane always remains true to its nature, apparently nullifying or rendering characters' efforts useless – made the process of adventuring in them unlikely. He also felt that adventuring in these planes would be "highly improbable or obviously contrived" for low- and mid-level characters, because designing a situation in which such characters can accomplish something important and survive would undermine the immensity and power of the planes. Eisenbeis concluded the review by stating, "Information presented on the planes is not extensive, art is simplistic and the potential for long-term adventuring, except for high-level characters, seems limited."

== Reviews ==
- Casus Belli #84 (Dec 1994)
- Rollespilsmagasinet Fønix (Danish) (Issue 5 - November/December 1994)
- Australian Realms #20
