= Forgotten Realms: Demon Stone =

2004 video game

- North American cover art
- Developer: Stormfront Studios (Note: Ported to Windows by Zono.)
- Publisher: Atari
- Producers: Alyssa Finley; Sarah W. Stocker
- Designers: J. Epps; Christopher Porter
- Programmers: Ralf Knoesel; Steve W. Kojder; Hai-Ping Kenneth Chao
- Artists: Devin St. Clair; John Kleber; Jeff Weir; Bill Boyer; Martin Servante
- Writers: R. A. Salvatore; Robert Goodman
- Composer: Robb Mills
- Platforms: PlayStation 2; Xbox; Windows
- Release: PlayStation 2: NA: September 14, 2004; AU: September 20, 2004; EU: September 24, 2004; Xbox: NA: November 17, 2004; PAL: February 11, 2005; Windows: NA: December 9, 2004; AU: December 17, 2004; EU: February 11, 2005
- Genres: Action role-playing, hack and slash
- Mode: Single-player

Forgotten Realms: Demon Stone is an action role-playing video game released in 2004 for PlayStation 2, Xbox and Microsoft Windows. It is set in the Forgotten Realms campaign setting for Dungeons & Dragons (D&D). The story was written by R.A. Salvatore and features the voices of Patrick Stewart as Khelben "Blackstaff" Arunsun and Michael Clarke Duncan as Ygorl.

== Synopsis ==
=== Characters and setting ===
There are three playable characters in Forgotten Realms: Demon Stone, each with their own unique abilities: the fighter Rannek who is a master of melee combat, the sorcerer Illius who can cast spells over long range, and the half-drow, half-wood-elf rogue Zhai who can vanish into the shadows for a stealthy kill.

The two villains are equally enemies of the heroes and of each other. The first villain—Ygorl—is the leader of the Slaad army. Cireka, general of the Githyanki, is the second. The game's introduction explains that the only thing keeping each of them from taking over the realm is their hatred for each other. Fearing that the realm would be at the mercy of whichever villain was victorious, the great mage Khelben Blackstaff sealed them both within a Demon Stone.

The story develops as the three heroes battle two orc armies near the jewel-rich Gemspark Mines. A great red dragon, sent by Ygorl, leads the group to these mines. Once there, they unwittingly release Ygorl and Cireka from the Demon Stone and into the world. The three heroes must undo their mistake by joining forces to right the wrong they caused.

=== Story ===
R.A. Salvatore wrote the game's script, which begins when Rannek, a human fighter, stumbles across a battle between two orc armies. As he comes to the aid of wood elves captured by the orcs, the rogue Zhai and the sorcerer Illius join the battle. Ultimately, Rannek, Zhai, and Illius are driven into the nearby Gemspark Mines by the dragon Caminus. Inside the mines, they accidentally release the warlords Ygorl and Cireka from their imprisonment in a Demon Stone. The three escape from the warlords and decide to join forces to imprison them again.

After evacuating the nearby wood-elf village of Cedarleaf, attacked by Cireka and her Githyanki soldiers, they visit Illius' mentor, Khelben Blackstaff, for advice. Blackstaff informs them that the new Demon Stone they require is in the possession of the Yuan-ti people. As the three leave, Ygorl arrives riding Caminus and attacks Khelben's tower. The tower is destroyed as they escape.

After they defeat the Yuan-ti and claim the Demon Stone, they seek out Drizzt Do'Urden, an unusually heroic drow, in the hopes that he can help them find Cireka. He directs them to an abandoned portal in the Underdark, home of the drow. When they find the portal, they also find Cireka and her Githyanki horde ready to make use of it. As the three battle the Githyanki, Ygorl arrives with his Slaad horde. Illius tries to imprison the two warlords in the Demon Stone, but Ygorl forces himself and Cireka through the portal before Illius can succeed. The three follow the warlords through the portal to the lair of Caminus. There, Cireka is killed by the dragon, and Ygorl flees through another portal. The three work together to slay Caminus, then pursue Ygorl through the portal.

The portal takes them back to Gemspark Mines. After fighting their way past Ygorl's hoard, they use a portal that leads to Limbo, where Ygorl waits for them. There, the heroes engage in a final duel with Ygorl, ultimately slaying him. They are welcomed back at Cedarleaf as heroes. Here, Khelben Blackstaff arrives through a portal, having survived the assault on his tower. He brings them the king's thanks and the offer of the untamed land of Vaasa to be their own, and also mentions that the Githyanki would aim to retrieve the "Silver Sword", previously owned by Cireka, as it is an ancient artifact. Rannek concludes by saying: "Let them try".

== Gameplay ==
Players have control over all three characters and can change character at any time (after all three main heroes arrive). There are many fighting moves, and players must use each character's skills to play the game effectively. Rannek uses a sword and breaks things with his gauntlets. Illius fights with a staff and uses magic (the game's most powerful ranged attack; the other two can throw knives (Zhai) or axes (Rannek)). Zhai uses two daggers and becomes invisible in shadows—this is useful for sneaking up on enemies and killing them. Bosses overpower characters in one-on-one fighting but can be defeated with the combined power of all three heroes. Although much of the game is hack-and-slash, there are several tasks that require the use of various skills.

== Cast ==
- Cireka, voiced by B.J. Ward
- Drizzt, (Note: The hero of many of Salvatore's novels, Drizzt Do'Urden, makes an appearance in the game; he is a playable character during a portion of one battle.) voiced by Robin Atkin Downes
- Illius, voiced by Christopher Nissley
- Khelben, voiced by Patrick Stewart
- Rannek, voiced by Dan Riordan
- Ygorl, voiced by Michael Clarke Duncan
- Zhai, voiced by Vanessa Marshall

== Reception ==
Reception

Aggregate scores
Aggregator	Score
GameRankings	PS2: 73% XBOX: 72% PC: 68%
Metacritic	PS2: 71/100; XBOX: 72/100; PC: 69/100

Awards
Publication	Award
British Academy of Film and Television Arts	2004 Games – Audio – Nominated
British Academy of Film and Television Arts	2004 Games – Original Music – Nominated
Academy of Interactive Arts & Sciences	2005 Outstanding Achievement in Character or Story Development – Nominated
Academy of Interactive Arts & Sciences	2005 Outstanding Achievement in Visual Engineering – Nominated
Academy of Interactive Arts & Sciences	2005 Outstanding Character Performance - Female – Nominated
Academy of Interactive Arts & Sciences	2005 Outstanding Character Performance - Male – Nominated

The game received a positive response from critics. Heather Newman of the Detroit Free Press called the game "extraordinarily cinematic", adding that "the dialogue and story line Salvatore crafted substantially contributed to that feel". Judy Siegel-Itzkovich of the Jerusalem Post gave the game four and half stars. She praised the graphics as "excellent", and the sound, calling the music "rousing and dramatic", the voice acting "high quality", and the sound effects "highly realistic". She concluded by saying that while fans would love the game, it is too short and the hack and slash element becomes "repetitive".

Demon Stone was nominated for two awards by the British Academy of Film and Television Arts (BAFTA), and four awards by the Academy of Interactive Arts & Sciences.
