= Manual of the Planes =

Tabletop role-playing game supplement

- Manual of the Planes, for 1st Edition AD&D
- Author: Jeff Grubb
- Genre: Role-playing game
- Publisher: TSR
- Publication date: 1987
- Media type: Print (Hardback)

The Manual of the Planes (abbreviated MoP) is a manual for the Dungeons & Dragons role-playing game. This text addresses the planar cosmology of the game universe.

The original book (for use with Advanced Dungeons & Dragons 1st Edition) was published in 1987 by TSR, Inc. For 2nd Edition, concern over inclusion of angels and demons led TSR to forgo the release, though they compensated years later with the Planescape campaign setting. A third edition version of the Manual of the Planes was published in 2001 by Wizards of the Coast, while a new version for 4th Edition debuted in 2008.

== Advanced Dungeons & Dragons first edition ==
The original Manual of the Planes was written by Jeff Grubb, with a cover by Jeff Easley and interior illustrations by Stephen Fabian with Easley, and was published by TSR in 1987 as a 128-page hardcover. Easley's cover featured an illustration of a creature named in the book as an "ethereal dreadnought", although the book had no description or game statistics for the creature. This creature was later identified in 2nd edition as an astral dreadnought.

The book describes various planes of existence, and what creatures characters might encounter there, covering the astral and ethereal planes, the elemental planes, and the outer planes. The book also details how to survive in the planes, and how combat and magic differ under each plane's special conditions. The Ethereal Plane, The Inner Planes—including the Plane of Elemental Air, the Plane of Elemental Fire, the Plane of Elemental Earth, and the Plane of Elemental Water, the Para-Elemental Planes (Smoke, Magma, Ooze, and Ice), the Energy Planes (Positive Energy and Negative Energy), and the Quasi-Elemental Planes (Lightning, Radiance, Minerals, Steam, Vacuum, Ash, Dust, and Salt)—and the Astral Plane. After these planes, the Outer Planes are briefly described, including Nirvana, Arcadia, Seven Heavens, Twin Paradises, Elysium, Happy Hunting Grounds, Olympus, Gladsheim, Limbo, Pandemonium, The Abyss, Tarterus, Hades, Gehenna, The Nine Hells, Acheron, and Concordant Opposition. Manual of the Planes explains how each of the outer planes is related to each of the character alignments. For example, "The Seven Heavens" is the final resting place for characters of Lawful Good alignment.

In 1999, a paperback reprint of the first edition was released.

== Dungeons & Dragons 3rd edition ==
Manual of the Planes
- Authors: Jeff Grubb, Bruce R. Cordell, and David Noonan
- Genre: Role-playing game
- Publisher: Wizards of the Coast
- Publication date: September 2001
- Media type: Print (Hardback)
- Pages: 224
- ISBN: 0-7869-1850-0

The third edition Manual of the Planes was designed by Jeff Grubb, Bruce R. Cordell, and David Noonan. Cover art is by Arnie Swekel, with interior art by Matt Cavotta, Monte Moore, Wayne Reynolds, Darrell Riche, David Roach, and Arnie Swekel.

After the typical introduction found in almost all guides of D&D 3rd. Edition, Manual of the Planes presents, in its first chapter, an overview of planes in general: what they are, what their nature is, and what is their function on gameplay. Info about how to shift between planes is also available in this chapter.

The second chapter presents hints on how to design your own cosmology of planes, based on the D&D official cosmology known as "The Great Wheel". Generating a personalized cosmology involves several options—for example, consider how magic works if basic planes that feed magic (such as the Ethereal or Astral planes) are disposed of.

The next chapters in the Manual are dedicated to detail the Great Wheel and the 27 planes that constitute it, including the Inner Planes and the Outer Planes.

The book also gives game statistics for monsters of the planes, such as the ephemera of the Plane of Shadow.

== Dungeons & Dragons 4th edition ==
Manual of the Planes
- Authors: Richard Baker, John Rogers, Robert J. Schwalb, and James Wyatt
- Genre: Role-playing game
- Publisher: Wizards of the Coast
- Publication date: 2008
- Media type: Print (Hardback)

This book was designed by Richard Baker (lead), John Rogers, Robert J. Schwalb, and James Wyatt. Cover art is by Howard Lyon, with interior art by Rob Alexander, Dave Allsop, Steve Belledin, Zoltan Boros & Gabor Szikszai, Chippy, Daarken, Eric Deschamps, Steve Ellis, Jason Engle, Ralph Horsley, Howard Lyon, Warren Mahy, Torstein Nordstrand, William O'Connor, Lucio Parillo, Anne Stokes, Francis Tsai, and Franz Vohwinkel. The 4th Edition Manual of the Planes reinvented the cosmology into a streamlined arrangement called the World Axis cosmology. It consists of five core types of planes:

- 1. The Mortal World
- 2. The Parallel Planes – two planes that are linked to the Mortal World
  - Feywild (Plane of Faerie)
  - Shadowfell (Plane of Shadow)
- 3. Fundamental Planes – two planes that surround the Mortal World
  - The Astral Sea – the plane above; consists of Astral Dominions
  - The Elemental Chaos – the plane below; consists of Elemental Realms
- 4. Demiplanes – unique bubbles of existence such as Sigil
- 5. Anomalous Planes – planes of an obscure nature
  - The Far Realm – uncharted plane that exists beyond the known cosmology
  - The Plane of Dreams – composed of all the dreams that have ever been dreamt

== Reception ==
The 3rd edition Manual of the Planes won the 2002 Ennie Award for "Best Rules Supplement".

Scott Taylor of Black Gate listed the Manual of the Planes as #4 on the list of "Top 10 'Orange Spine' AD&D Hardcovers By Jeff Easley, saying "Ethereal Dreadnaught... enough said. Well perhaps not truly 'enough', but you get the idea."

Viktor Coble listed Manual of the Planes as #7 on CBR's 2021 "D&D: 10 Best Supplemental Handbooks" list, stating that "it expands the Dungeons and Dragons base-world, making an entire universe complete with in-game lore, methods of traversing these elements, and brand new mechanics to account for them."

== Reviews ==
- Casus Belli #40 (Oct 1987)
- Backstab #34
- Dragon Slayer
- Backstab #43 (as "Manuel des plans")
- Dragão Brasil
- Dragão Brasil

== Legacy ==
The astral dreadnought on the cover art for the original Manual of the Planes was the inspiration for the Cacodemon in the Doom video game series.

== Bibliography ==
- Grubb, Jeff; Noonan, David; Cordell, Bruce R. (2001). Manual of the Planes (3rd ed.). Wizards of the Coast. ISBN 0-7869-1850-0. Archived from the original on May 7, 2008.
