= Hoard of the Dragon Queen =

D&D adventure module

- 2014 edition with cover art by Raymond Swanland
- Rules required: Dungeons & Dragons, 5th edition
- Character levels: 1-8
- Campaign setting: Forgotten Realms
- Authors: Wolfgang Baur; Steve Winter
- First published: 2014
- Pages: 96
- ISBN: 978-0786965649

Linked modules
- Tyranny of Dragons, The Rise of Tiamat

Hoard of the Dragon Queen is an adventure module created by Kobold Press and published by Wizards of the Coast (WotC) in 2014 as the first adventure for the 5th edition of the Dungeons & Dragons fantasy role-playing game. It is the first part of the two-part Tyranny of Dragons storyline, the sequel being The Rise of Tiamat.

== Description ==
Hoard of the Dragon Queen and its sequel, The Rise of Tiamat, pit the player characters against the evil dragon queen Tiamat and her minions. The adventure takes place in the Forgotten Realms setting.

=== Plot summary ===
In an audacious bid for power, the Cult of the Dragon, along with its dragon allies and the Red Wizards of Thay, seek to return Tiamat from her prison in the Nine Hells to Faerûn. To this end, they are sweeping from town to town, laying waste to all those who oppose them and gathering a hoard of riches for their dread queen. The threat of annihilation has become so dire that groups as disparate as the Harpers and the Zhentarim are banding together in the fight against the cult.

The module is divided into eight episodes:

1. "Greenest in Flames": A small town is attacked by a dragon and members of a dragon cult.
2. "Raiders' Camp": The town tasks the adventurers with pursuing the raiders to recover kidnapped townspeople.
3. "Dragon Hatchery": The party returns to the raiders' camp to uncover a secret guarded by the cultists.
4. "On the Road": They follow a convoy carrying loot to the next town, where they ally themselves with factions rising up against the dragon raiders..
5. "Construction Ahead": They follow the convoy to Waterdeep, which then turns north.
6. "Castle Naerytar": They follow the convoy to the lair of the dragon cult hidden within a vast swamp where they discover a teleportation portal.
7. "Hunting Lodge": The portal takes them to a large hunting lodge that serves as a transit hub for important cult members.
8. "Castle in the Clouds": The party discovers a flying castle hidden in clouds above a village where the dragon cult stores their stolen loot.

Player characters start at 1st-level and gain one level of experience with each chapter, reaching 8th-level by the end of the adventure.

== Publication history ==
In 2014, as part of the release of the new 5th edition of D&D, WotC commissioned Kobold Press to design the first adventures for the new edition. Wolfgang Baur and Steve Winter subsequently created a two-part adventure path, Tyranny of Dragons, the first part being Hoard of the Dragon Queen, which was released by WotC in August 2014 as a 96-page hardcover book with cover art by Raymond Swanland and interior art by Aaron Hübrich, Tyler Jacobson, Guido Kuip, Marcel Mercado, and Bryan Syme. WotC also simultaneously launched game supplements, video games, and other outlets.

The first three chapters of this adventure were also released as part of a free D&D Encounters kit for the D&D Adventurers League, WotC's official organized play program.

Two months later, in October 2014, the sequel adventure The Rise of Tiamat was released. A month later, Gale Force Nine released a licensed four-panel Tyranny of Dragons gamemaster's screen.

=== Re-release of Tyranny of Dragons ===
Five years after the original publication, a new edition of Tyranny of Dragons was released in October 2019 for sale only in local game and hobby stores. This new edition repackaged Hoard of the Dragon Queen and The Rise of Tiamat together as a single volume, and also included a full errata, a reworked opening chapter, and new cover art from artist Hydro74. James Whitbrook, for Io9, reported that "the re-release incorporates player feedback from the first two releases to smooth out the progressive curve of the quests presented in Hoard of the Dragon Queen and The Rise of Tiamat, which will encompass all the tweaks and addendums made to how D&D fifth edition plays in the five years gamers have had their hands on it. As an included bonus, the book will also include extra resources for players and dungeon masters that were only previously available online, as well as a treasure trove of behind-the-scenes concept art made for the adventure that rivals even Tiamat’s most desirable loot".

This edition was re-released in January 2023 with new cover art but no changes to the content.

== Reception ==
Jonathan Bolding, for The Escapist, wrote that "structurally, it's a solid premise and interesting, but in play and as written the middle sections really tend to lag and create dragging, boring play where dungeon masters have to narrate hours of travel and punctuate when something 'interesting' happens. Even if your group are the types to go out of their way to familiarize themselves with the plethora of interesting NPCs that the adventure includes as part of their caravan north, only a bare handful of those NPCs actually matter outside their adventure segment".

AV Club's Samantha Nelson wrote that "the game does a great job at creating urgency. You can rest and heal, but doing so comes at the cost of one of the possible quests and the experience points you would gain for completing it. But players who want to do everything are setting themselves up for failure. One quest actually leads you into an ambush by cultists looking to stop your party's meddling. If you don't see it coming, you're in for a really hard fight. The adventure also makes the bold decision of starting your heroes off as losers".

Bleeding Cool's Gavin Sheehan wrote that "the rewards are minimal, especially in the experience department for the first few episodes. It's enough to get by but not enough to make the characters super powerful moving forward. Normally I would say this is a nice balance of power and experience, but doing the math on a fresh character sheet, it feels like you're always on the cusp of being great when you truly need to be great. [...] The story itself truly picks up when you hit Castle Naerytar, which is much further down the road after you've figured out who you are and what works best for your character, and hopefully have reached Level 5 in grand fashion".

DieHard GameFan called Hoard of the Dragon Queen "a great co-release to go with the Player's Handbook. The adventures are fun, they are well written and well balanced, and with eight different episodes in this campaign, you're really getting a fantastic deal for your [money]."

=== Other reviews and commentary ===
- Casus Belli (v4, Issue 13 - Jan/Feb 2015)
