= The Rise of Tiamat =

Dungeons & Dragons game adventure module

- 2014 edition with cover art by Michael Kormarck
- Rules required: Dungeons & Dragons, 5th edition
- Character levels: 8-16
- Authors: Alexander Winter; Steve Winter
- First published: 2014
- Pages: 96
- ISBN: 978-0786965656

Linked modules
- Tyranny of Dragons

The Rise of Tiamat is an adventure module created by Kobold Press and published by Wizards of the Coast (WotC) in 2014 as part of the first set of adventures for the 5th edition of the Dungeons & Dragons fantasy role-playing game. It is the second adventure in the two-part Tyranny of Dragons storyline, the first adventure being Hoard of the Dragon Queen.

== Description ==
The Rise of Tiamat, along with the previous adventure, Hoard of the Dragon Queen, pits player characters against the 5-headed dragon queen Tiamat and her minions. The adventure takes place in the Forgotten Realms setting. Suggestions are provided for how to introduce players to the plot line in The Rise of Tiamat if they did not play the first adventure of the series.

=== Plot summary ===
In the first part of this two-adventure set, Hoard of the Dragon Queen, a dragon cult hoping to return Tiamat from the Nine Hells to Faerûn swept across small towns and villages, killing and looting. The player characters followed the trail of loot to a fortress in the sky.

The second adventure, The Rise of Tiamat, continues this storyline and is divided into eight episodes.

1. "Council of Waterdeep": The party has returned to Waterdeep and takes part in a council of various factions to decide on next steps.
2. "The Sea of Moving Ice": The party sets off for the far north to gather information about the Draakhorn, a mythical artifact with the ability to summon dragons.
3. "Death to the Wyrmspeakers": The party uncovers the names of two important personalities in the dragon cult. They trace the first to the Serpent Hills
4. A continuation of the previous chapter, where they trace the second dragon cult leader to the Misty Forest.
5. "The Cult Strikes Back": Agents of the Dragon Cult attempt to assassinate the heroes.
6. "Metallic Dragons": The party, representing the Waterdeep Council, attends a Council of Metallic (good) Dragons.
7. "Xonthal's Tower": A leader of the Dragon Cult asks for help in escaping a heavily guarded fortress.
8. "Mission to Thay": The party is sent on an embassy to the Red Wizards of Thay.
9. "Tiamat's Return": The party attempts to stop the ritual that will bring Tiamat back.

Player characters start at 8th level and gain one level of experience with each chapter, reaching 16th level by the end of the adventure.

The book also contains several appendices with notable non-player characters, new monsters, new magic items, and new artifacts.

== Publication history ==
In 2014, as part of the release of the new 5th edition of D&D, WotC commissioned Kobold Press to design the first adventures for the new edition. Kobold Press subsequently created a two-part adventure path, Tyranny of Dragons, the first part being Hoard of the Dragon Queen, released by WotC in August 2014. The second part was The Rise of Tiamat, a 96-page hardcover book designed by Alexander Winter and Steve Winter, with cover art by Michael Komarck and interior art by John-Paul Balmet, Nicole Ashley Cardiff, Guido Kuip, Marcel Mercado, and Bryan Syme, released in October 2014. WotC also simultaneously launched game supplements, video games, and other outlets.

A month later, Gale Force Nine released a licensed four-panel Tyranny of Dragons gamemaster's screen.

=== Re-release of Tyranny of Dragons ===
Five years after the original publication of the two separate adventures, a new edition of Tyranny of Dragons was released in October 2019 for sale only in local game and hobby stores. This new edition repackaged Hoard of the Dragon Queen and The Rise of Tiamat together as a single volume, and also included a full errata, a reworked opening chapter, and new cover art from artist Hydro74. James Whitbrook, for Io9, reported that "the re-release incorporates player feedback from the first two releases to smooth out the progressive curve of the quests presented in Hoard of the Dragon Queen and The Rise of Tiamat, which will encompass all the tweaks and addendums made to how D&D fifth edition plays in the five years gamers have had their hands on it. As an included bonus, the book will also include extra resources for players and dungeon masters that were only previously available online, as well as a treasure trove of behind-the-scenes concept art made for the adventure that rivals even Tiamat’s most desirable loot".

This edition was re-released in January 2023 with new cover art but no changes to the content.

== Reception ==
Scott Wachter of RPGamer wrote that the adventure "on the page is shallow, generic, excessively linear and overall uninspired. The attempt to revive the classic-feel of D&D, complete with multi-part adventures is noble, but maybe they should have tried to emulate one of the good ones."

DieHard GameFan said that "once you get past the obvious layout and editing issues, you're getting an exceptional amount of content and value for a relatively small price tag. The Rise of Tiamat is certainly a fine way to end The Tyranny of Dragons and it will keep you occupied for several months to come."

In Irregular Magazine, Jason Hubbard liked the look and feel of the product, noting, "The production value of the book is excellent, the artwork is outstanding though this has become something I expect of a D&D product." Regarding the actual adventure, Hubbard commented, "The level of detail that is described throughout the book is excellent. Some of the encounters have great maps and intricate room by room descriptions. There are parts that do lack detail and will need the gamemaster to add some flavour to them, especially the council events which are quite sparse." Hubbard concluded, "It's really a great adventure to get your teeth stuck into and will take the players on a quite comprehensive path across the [Forgotten Realms]. Overall it's a great product and an enjoyable adventure to play."

== Awards ==
At the 2015 ENnie Awards, Rise of Tiamat received the gold award for Best Cover Art.

== Other reviews and commentary ==
- Casus Belli (v4, Issue 13 - Jan/Feb 2015)
