= Dragon (Dungeons & Dragons) =

Monstrous creature from Dungeons & Dragons

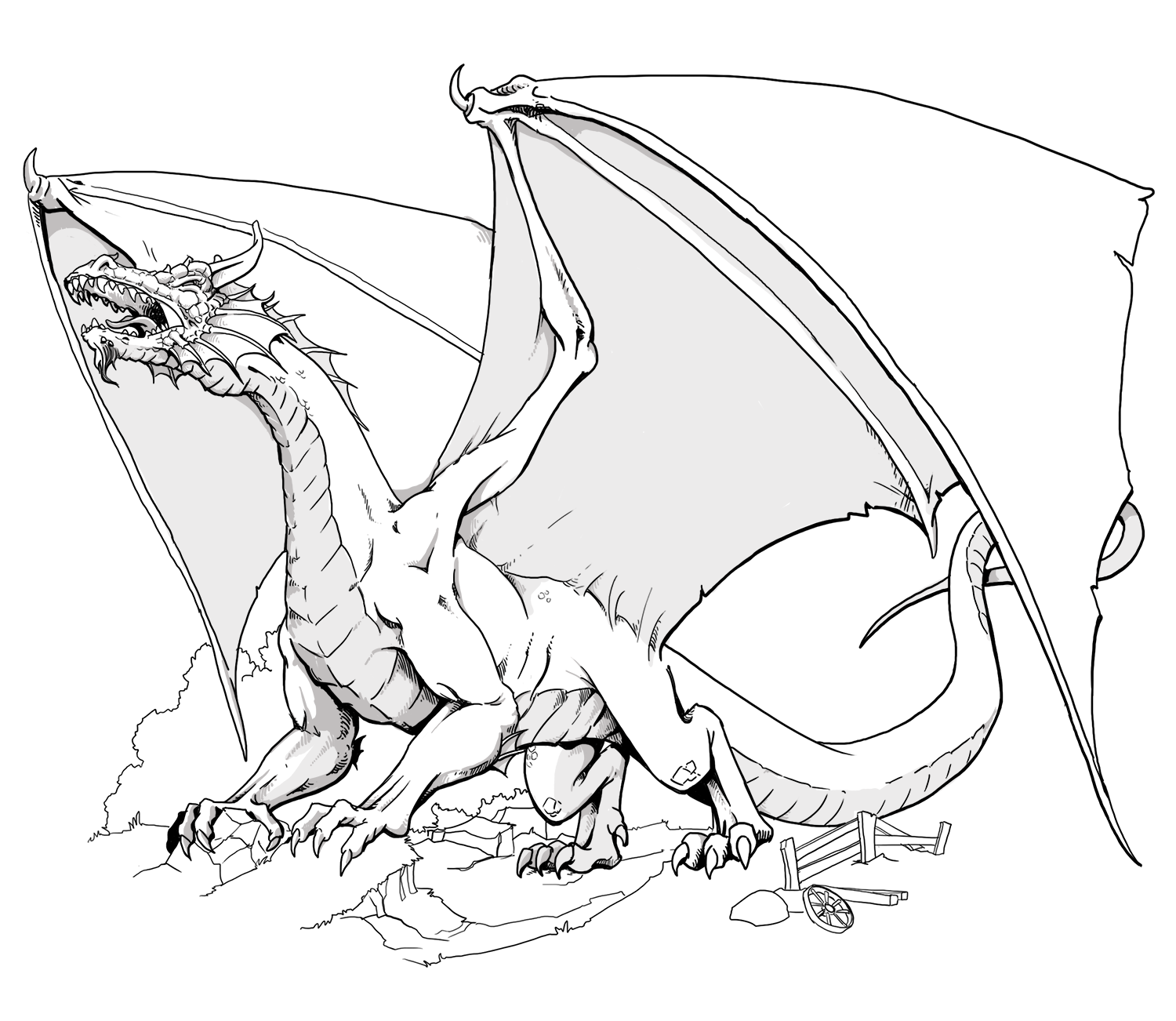
- First appearance: original Dungeons & Dragons "white box" set (1974)
- Based on: Dragon

In-universe information
- Type: Monstrous creature

In the Dungeons & Dragons (D&D) fantasy role-playing game, dragons are an iconic type of monstrous creature. As a group, D&D dragons are loosely based on dragons from a wide range of fictional and mythological sources. These dragons, specifically their "dungeon ecology", have implications for the literary theory of fantasy writing. D&D dragons also featured as targets of the moral panic surrounding the game.

In D&D, dragons are depicted as any of various species of large, intelligent, magical, reptilian beasts, each typically defined by a combination of their demeanor and either the color of their scales or their elemental affinity. For example, a commonly presented species of dragon is the red dragon, which is named for its red scales, and known for its evil and greedy nature, as well as its ability to breathe fire. In the game, dragons are often adversaries of player characters, and less commonly, allies or helpers.

== Overview ==
Powerful and intelligent, the fictional dragons of Dungeons & Dragons are reptiles with magical abilities and breath weapons. The different sub-species, distinguished by their coloring, vary in power.

Despite the variety of dragons in D&D, a number of traits are common to nearly all types of dragons. Every species is portrayed as generally reptilian or serpentine in their natural form. Except for the youngest dragons, they are described as quite large—usually at least the size of a horse, and often much larger. Most species are depicted to have wings and be capable of flight, and nearly all are quadrupedal. Almost every species of dragon is depicted as highly intelligent (at least as intelligent as a human being) and are able to speak. All species of dragon are noted to be magical in nature, and in most species, this nature is expressed as an affinity for some type of elemental power. Some dragon species can cast magical spells as well. Most dragons in D&D have the ability to breathe or expel one or more types of energy associated with their elemental affinity, as well as to resist some damage or injury from other sources of such energy. Some dragons have two different kinds of breath weapons, usually one that can cause physical harm to player characters (fire, ice, acid, lightning, etc.) and another which typically causes an impairment (paralysis, repulsion, confusion, etc.).

Dragons are noted to be egg-layers, and most are described with sharp teeth, horns, and claws. A dragon in D&D is protected by its scaly hide, the color of which is determined by the dragon's species, and also offers a visual clue to the specific elemental nature of each species of dragon. Each species of dragon has a particular temperament associated with it, as well as a moral outlook derived from that temperament. These factors underlie the personality and behavior of individual dragons. While dragons typically are not portrayed with wide variances in appearance or personality within a species, exceptions are possible, especially in certain in-game settings, such as Eberron.

Since dragons in D&D are portrayed as monstrous creatures designed to antagonize player characters, the majority of dragons in D&D are described as evil by default. This was more prominent in the original Dungeons & Dragons releases (such as the Dungeons & Dragons "white box" set (1974) and Dungeons & Dragons Basic Set) where only the gold dragon was specified to be lawful good while all other colors were noted to be chaotic evil (red, green, black) or neutral evil (blue, white).

Detailed information about dragonkind in the 2nd, 3rd, or 4th editions of D&D may be found in their respective editions of the Draconomicon, a supplement book designed to provide players with more information about dragons; the fifth edition has the similarly-themed Fizban's Treasury of Dragons. No such book was published for the first edition, although the Basic game had a Bestiary of Dragons and Giants (coded AC10).

== Publication history ==
=== Origins ===
Medieval literature scholar Thomas Honegger considered it "no coincidence" that the seminal role-playing game "features the dragon, a most formidable opponent, as the second element of its name" as the "recognition of the dragon as the most dangerous animal is traditional" in epic literature.

Five evil-aligned dragons (white dragon, black dragon, green dragon, blue dragon, and red dragon), and the lawful-good aligned golden dragon (in ascending order of magic power and capabilities) first appeared in the original Dungeons & Dragons "white box" set (1974). The Greyhawk Campaign supplement (1975) added the copper dragon, brass dragon, bronze dragon, and silver dragon, along with the Platinum Dragon (Bahamut) and the Chromatic Dragon (Tiamat). "Dragon" was one of the protected terms from the works of J. R. R. Tolkien involved in a lawsuit between rights holder Saul Zaentz and TSR in 1977.

The white dragon, black dragon, red dragon and brass dragon reappeared in the original Dungeons & Dragons Basic Set (1977). The six dragons from the 1974 boxed set appeared in the Dungeons & Dragons Basic Rulebook (1981), and again in the 1983 version of the Basic Set (1983). These six appeared along with the gemstone dragons (crystal dragon, onyx dragon, jade dragon, sapphire dragon, ruby dragon and amber dragon), and the dragon rulers (Pearl (the Moon Dragon), Ruler of all Chaotic Dragons; Diamond (the Star Dragon), Ruler of all Lawful Dragons; Opal (the Sun Dragon), Ruler of all Neutral Dragons; and the Great One, Ruler of All Dragonkind) in the Dungeons & Dragons Rules Cyclopedia (1991).

The five chaotic-aligned dragon types from the 1974 boxed set, as well as the gold dragon and the four new dragon types from the Greyhawk supplement (the copper dragon, brass dragon, bronze dragon, and silver dragon) appeared in first edition Advanced Dungeons & Dragons in the original Monster Manual (1977), along with Bahamut and Tiamat. The former five dragon types were given as evil-aligned, while the latter five dragon types were given as good-aligned. The ten dragon types were given pseudoscientific names as follows: black (draco causticus sputem), blue (draco electricus), brass (draco impudentus gallus), bronze (draco gerus bronzo), copper (draco comes stabuli), gold (draco orientalus sino dux), green (draco chlorinous nauseous respiratorus), red (draco conflagratio horriblis), silver (draco nobilis argentum), and white (draco rigidus frigidus).

The Oriental dragons appeared in the original Fiend Folio (1981), including the li lung (earth dragon), the lung wang (sea dragon), the pan lung (coiled dragon), the shen lung (spirit dragon), the t'ien lung (celestial dragon), and the yu lung (carp dragon). The cloud dragon, the faerie dragon, the mist dragon, and the shadow dragon appeared in the original Monster Manual II (1983).

=== Second edition ===
In the second edition of Advanced Dungeons & Dragons (AD&D), dragons were altered heavily from their first edition equivalents and were made much more powerful with magic resistance, removing the subdual rules, and now had more physical attack forms besides claws and bites. AD&D 2nd edition and D&D 3rd edition divided true dragons further into three main categories: chromatic dragons which are evil-aligned; metallic dragons which are good; and neutral-aligned gem dragons, rare creatures that possess psionic abilities. In addition, there were other subspecies of true dragons that did not fit into the three main categories. For example, mercury and steel dragons would seem to be metallic dragons, but in the Dungeons & Dragons world they are considered to be outside of the main family of metallic dragons because of various biological differences (though the book Dragons of Faerûn did list them as metallic dragons). The "lung dragons" or spirit-dragons of Oriental Adventures are also true dragons.

The black dragon, blue dragon, brass dragon, bronze dragon, copper dragon, gold dragon, green dragon, red dragon, silver dragon, and white dragon appeared in second edition Advanced Dungeons & Dragons in the Monstrous Compendium Volume One (1989). The faerie dragon, and the Oriental dragons—lung wang (sea dragon), pan lung (coiled dragon), shen lung (spirit dragon), t'ien lung (celestial dragon), tun mi lung (typhoon dragon), yu lung (carp dragon), chiang ling (river dragon), and li lung (earth dragon)—appeared in the Monstrous Compendium Forgotten Realms Appendix (1989). The radiant dragon appeared in the Spelljammer: AD&D Adventures in Space boxed set (1989).

The dragons of Krynn', the amphi dragon, the astral dragon, the kodragon, the othlorx dragon, and the sea dragon appeared in the Monstrous Compendium Dragonlance Appendix (1990). The cloud dragon, the Greyhawk dragon, the mist dragon, and the shadow dragon appeared in the Monstrous Compendium Greyhawk Appendix (1990). The adamantite dragon appeared in the Monstrous Compendium Outer Planes Appendix (1991). The moon dragon, the sun dragon, and the stellar dragon appeared in the Monstrous Compendium Spelljammer Appendix (1991). The deep dragon appeared in the Monstrous Compendium Forgotten Realms Appendix II (1991).

The gem dragons (the amethyst dragon, the crystal dragon, the emerald dragon, the sapphire dragon, and the topaz dragon) first appeared in The Dragon magazine #037 (May 1980), and then appeared again in the Monstrous Compendium Fiend Folio Appendix (1992). The chromatic dragons (black dragon, blue dragon, green dragon, red dragon, and white dragon), the gem dragons (amethyst dragon, crystal dragon, emerald dragon, sapphire dragon, and topaz dragon), metallic dragons (brass dragon, bronze dragon, copper dragon, gold dragon, and silver dragon), brown dragon, cloud dragon, deep dragon, mercury dragon, mist dragon, shadow dragon, steel dragon, and yellow dragon appeared in the Monstrous Manual (1993). The onyx dragon, jade dragon, ruby dragon and amber dragon appeared in the Monstrous Compendium Mystara Appendix (1994).

=== Third edition ===
The chromatic dragons (black, blue, green, red, and white), and the metallic dragons (brass, bronze, copper, gold, and silver) appeared in the third edition in the Monster Manual (2000), and in the revised 3.5 Monster Manual (2003). Their depictions by Todd Lockwood and Sam Wood tried to incorporate the "very inventive" original designs by Dave Sutherland from 1st edition while making them anatomically more credible, and differentiate all species through distinctions in wing-shape in addition to head details. 3rd edition's is "what Wizards designers now consider the "definitive" representations of these monsters." The Gem dragons appeared in the third edition in the Monster Manual II.

The third edition of D&D classifies dragon as a type of creature, simply defined as "a reptilelike creature, usually winged, with magical or unusual abilities". The dragon type is broken down into several classifications. True dragons are dragons which increase in power by age categories (wyrmling to great wyrm). Lesser dragons do not improve in age categories and may lack all of the abilities of true dragons. Examples of lesser dragons include dragon turtles and wyverns. Other creatures with the dragon type include drakes, felldrakes, elemental drakes, landwyrms, linnorms and wurms.

=== Fourth edition ===
With D&D 4th edition, the classifications were changed: chromatic dragons turned not strictly evil, and metallic dragons proved not necessarily good. There are also several new categories (although the gem dragons did not return): "planar dragons" which are defined as dragons that were warped by living on a plane of existence other than the Material Plane, "catastrophe dragons", which take on the aspects of natural disasters that are chaotic evil and cause chaos for its own sake, and "scourge dragons".

The five chromatic dragon types (black, blue, green, red, and white) appeared in young, adult, elder, and ancient variants in the fourth edition Monster Manual (2008). Chromatic dragons were again presented in the Draconomicon: Chromatic Dragons. This supplement also included three more chromatic dragon types: the brown dragon (aka, sand dragon), the grey dragon (aka, fang dragon), and the purple dragon (aka, deep dragon). The adamantine dragon, copper dragon, gold dragon, iron dragon, and silver dragon appeared in the Monster Manual 2 (2009). Metallic dragons are presented in the Monster Manual 2 and Draconomicon: Metallic Dragons. Catastrophe dragons are presented in Monster Manual 3. Planar dragons have been presented in both Draconomicon: Chromatic Dragons and Draconomicon: Metallic Dragons.

=== Fifth edition ===
The five basic chromatic dragons (red, blue, green, black, and white) and metallic dragons (copper, brass, silver, gold, and bronze) appeared in the fifth edition Monster Manual (2014) in wyrmling, young, adult, and ancient. Gem dragons and other new-to-fifth-edition dragons appeared in Fizban's Treasury of Dragons (2021).

== Game mechanics ==
Ever since 2nd edition AD&D, true dragons continue to become more powerful as they mature and age. They grow larger and stronger, and become more resistant to damage and magic. Their breath weapon also becomes increasingly dangerous and their knowledge and magical abilities improves. Old dragons can cast draconic magic which is a special form of D&D magic. Dragons can cast spells with just a few words, rather than a sometimes long and complex ritual involving speech, gestures and preparations like other D&D wizards. In the 3 and 3.5 editions, dragons spontaneously cast spells like sorcerers, and sometimes have a wider variety of spells. Dragons also radiate a mystical fear aura around them. After a millennium or two, a dragon reaches their maximum development.

Many D&D dragons have innate magical abilities, but they vary from race to race. Metallic dragons are often able to shapeshift into small animals or human forms, and use this ability to secretly help or watch over humans. Dragons also have some innate powers over the element they are linked to. For example, a red dragon (fire) will have some control over fires. Like all other draconic powers, they gain more as they grow older. Lesser dragons (like wyverns, halfdragons or dragonwrought kobolds) may lack innate magical abilities, while still counting as dragons for purpose of all other effects.

=== Breath weapon ===
A breath weapon is the cone or line shaped weapon exhaled by dragons in D&D. Each type of dragon has a different breath weapon. The chromatic dragons have one breath weapon and the metallic dragons have two. Other dragons and semi-dragons frequently have breath weapons. One example is the dragon turtle's cone of steam breath weapon.

==== Form ====
Breath weapons typically come in one of three forms.

- Line: Does damage in a straight line.
- Cone: Does damage in a wide cone shape.
- Cloud: Does damage with a cloud of gas.

==== Composition ====
Breath weapons typically are composed of one of several materials (gem dragons may have breath weapons of other materials, such as psychic energy and thunderous bursts of sound).

- Fire: Magical fire is used by gold dragons, brass dragons and red dragons.
- Electricity: Lightning is exhaled by blue dragons and bronze dragons.
- Acid: The black and copper dragon exhale a powerful acid.
- Poison: The green dragon's breath weapon is a cloud of chlorine gas.
- Cold: The white and silver dragons both release a cone of sub zero air and ice.

=== Magic ===
True dragons are born with a natural flair for magic, but they need to practice and hone their skills and come of age before they are able to use it to any meaningful effect.

== Fictional traits ==
=== Biology ===
Dragons are inherently magical beings, and are, contrary to appearances, not reptilian in nature. All true dragons are endothermic, with its body temperature varying based on their age and species. However, unlike most endothermic creatures, dragons have no way of shedding excess heat. Instead, the heat is extracted via an organ known as the draconis fundamentum, where it is transformed into energy for the creature. A dragon is also unaffected by a lack of external heat, without slowing their metabolism nor activity level.

The number of eggs laid each time depends on the race of the dragon, but is usually low (between one and ten). Dragons can also cross-breed with virtually any other creature, creating a half-dragon. The most commonly heard of are in the humanoid races, particularly with human and elves. Nearly any combination is possible, even with devils or angels.

While varying depending on species, dragon senses are often superior in most ways to other creatures. Like any predator, they have exceptionally acute senses, which only increase with age. Like avian creatures, they have excellent depth perception and comparingly good peripheral vision, and are able to see twice as well as a human in daylight. Unlike avian, they have great night vision, and are able to see even when conditions have no light to offer, although in such conditions they cannot discern between colors.

=== Behavior ===
All true dragons in Dungeons & Dragons are depicted as intelligent beings. A dragon's personality varies by individual, but dragons of the same subrace tend to have similar mindsets. This is not always true however, and several exceptions exist in official D&D material. Dragon subraces encompass all Dungeons & Dragons alignments, going from lawful good paladin-like gold dragons to the cruel and greedy chaotic evil red dragons.

All dragons share a common desire to collect treasure, be it precious, beautiful, magical or just shiny. Indeed, the treasure in question need not always be gold, and may sometimes be aesthetic in nature, ranging from popular artwork or sculptures or even rare books and tomes that might otherwise have an overwhelming monetary value. For evil-aligned dragons, this generally directs a greedy attitude to achieve such wealth by whatever means suit them. For good dragons, this lust for treasure is tempered, although they are certainly not averse to earning such wealth, and still appreciate gifts (while being insulted if offered an obvious bribe).

Being stronger, faster, generally smarter, and possessing longer life than humans and most other races, dragons tend to consider themselves superior creatures. For good-aligned dragons, this may simply mean they consider humanoid races as children, trying to take care of them and educate them. For evil-aligned dragons, they consider humanoids as mere animals, or as toys to play with. At best, they are minions and slaves, while at worst, they are the dragon's next meal.

The longevity of dragons is evident in their often unenthusiastic attitudes. Good-aligned dragons, while concerned with defeating evil, are able to see a much broader scope of the world, and although certain crises arise that may seem very important to good-aligned humans, their dragon counterparts have the ability to view the event as an unimportant hiccup which will pass in mere centuries. Even those that adventure with others tend show a sense of incredible patience, including in situations where everyone feels they have not a second to lose. Similarly, evil-aligned dragons that are crossed by belligerent adventurers may plot for dozens of generations before exacting revenge on the trespasser's line. It is not uncommon for those descended from the mentioned adventurer to find themselves the target of a dragon based simply on their lineage.

== In campaign settings ==
In many settings, the god-king of the metallic dragons is Bahamut, the Platinum Dragon, and the goddess and queen of the chromatic dragons is Tiamat, the Five-Headed Dragon. She is based on the Tiamat from Babylonian mythology, who was considered the evil mother of dragons, though the appearances of the fictional deity differs greatly from its model.

The progenitor and supreme deity of all dragons in the game is known as Io. Other deities often included in the draconic pantheon of gods include Aasterinian, Chronepsis, and Faluzure. Other draconic gods may be present in different campaign settings.

=== Dragonlance setting ===
The Dragonlance novels and campaign setting, that had the idea of "a world where dragons dominated" as a concept of its development, helped popularize the D&D-derived perspective on dragons. Here the Platinum Dragon is called Paladine, and the Dragon Queen is called Takhisis. Dragons are divided up into good and evil groups, which are known as the Metallic Dragons and the Chromatic Dragons, respectively. Paladine leads the Metallic Dragons and Takhisis the Chromatic. The Metallic Dragons rarely became involved in the world other than to oppose the actions of Chromatic Dragons, who often joined into war as their goddess Takhisis instructed. However, in the "Fifth Age", massive Chromatic Dragons who were not native to Krynn emerged and took over many of the humanoid-controlled nations of Krynn, as well as slaying most of the native dragons. They are known as Dragon Overlords. There was one from each race of Chromatic Dragons: red, green, black, white, and blue.

=== Dark Sun setting ===
In the world of Athas of the Dark Sun campaign setting, normal D&D dragons do not exist. Dragon-like drake races exist, one for each classical element, but for most people, the word dragon refers to the Dragon of Tyr. He is a highly powerful sorcerer-king (the tyrannic leaders of Athasian cities, that are both masters of magic and psionic abilities) who transformed himself into a dragon-like creature using very strong (and painful) magic. However, this dragon (Bors or Borys) was eventually killed in Troy Denning's book The Cerulean Storm by his former master, the sorcerer Rajaat. Several other sorcerer kings had been rumored to be dragons, but all others were only in a process of being transformed into a dragon type being, unique to the Athas world, which took several long stages to complete and became greatly powerful if achieved.

=== Forgotten Realms setting ===
In the Forgotten Realms campaign setting, dragons are very close to the ones in Dragonlance. A sect of cultists called the Cult of the Dragon believes that dragons, particularly undead ones, will rule the world, and are trying to persuade evil dragons to become dracoliches—undead lich-like dragons, which are partially bound to the cult by the rituals which grant them their undead status. Additionally, in the D&D supplement book The Draconomicon, several other undead varieties of the dragon – ghost, skeleton, vampire, and zombie dragons – are described.

A series called Wyrms of the North ran in Dragon magazine issues #230 through #259 and was later updated to third edition rules on Wizards of the Coast's website (see external links). Each article detailed an individual dragon of significance in Faerûn.

There was an ancient affliction that attacks dragons, rendering them mad. The Dracorage was invoked, causing countless dragons to rampage throughout Faerûn. A novel trilogy, The Year of Rogue Dragons set (The Rage, The Rite, and The Ruin) by Richard Lee Byers, as well as a game accessory, Dragons of Faerûn, details the exploits and deeds of several dragons as the Dracorage swept the continent.

=== World of Greyhawk setting ===
Steel dragons, initially known as Greyhawk dragons, are those originating in the World of Greyhawk campaign setting, later appearing in other settings like the Forgotten Realms. They have hair-like spines around their heads, cat-like bodies with vaguely human-like faces, and scales resembling steel armor. They are much like the other races of metallic dragon with one primary exception: they prefer to maintain the form of another sentient race in order to mingle with, infiltrate, and study the cultures of men and their sort. Few people know when they are interacting with a Steel Dragon, but they always have a feature which betrays them by resembling their natural complexion. Within the Greyhawk setting, such dragons are known to have made journeys into other material planes where they have come to be called steel dragons.

=== Council of Wyrms setting ===
The Council of Wyrms campaign setting is the only one that allows for dragon player characters in its base rules. The Draconomicon introduces rules for dragon PCs in standard Dungeons & Dragons. The setting is based around a society of dragons and their servitors and uses the standard D&D dragon races and dragon gods. It has detailed rules for creating and playing dragon PCs and NPCs, including various draconic character classes.

=== Eberron setting ===
In the Eberron campaign setting, three dragon gods have created the world: Siberys, Eberron and Khyber. Siberys and Eberron waged war against Khyber and imprisoned it within the depths of the earth. In the end, all three dragons merged with the land: Siberys becoming the sky, Eberron the continents and Khyber the underground world.

Dragons are apart from civilization, which is mostly concentrated on the continent of Khorvaire. They live on the continent of Argonnessen, a rather unknown place, since dragons are very territorial, it makes exploration often hazardous. The dragons used to rule over Eberron many centuries ago, but at the end of the Dragon-Fiend war, against the demons and devils of Khyber, they departed from Khorvaire to go to Argonnessen.

Dragons are immersed in the Draconic Prophecy, a legend which all bits of information are scattered throughout the world and that the outcome is unknown. They see every event as an important event in the Prophecy, and they even form an organization called the Chamber, where they send their brethren in search of clues. They can be of any alignment, like all creatures in Eberron, so a good red dragon (usually evil) is as common as an evil gold dragon (usually good). This rule might throw some players off-balance. Dragons also consider themselves superior, treating all other races as inferior. Furthermore, any half-dragon spotted by these dragons is vowed to be hunted, as they treat these half-breeds as a disgrace to their image.

=== Birthright setting ===
The Birthright campaign setting had its own version of a Dragon, named Cerilian Dragon, Cerilia being the main continent in the setting. They resemble more the eastern-type dragons being long and serpentine with leathery wings. Their backs are protected by iron-hard scales, their bellies by layers of thick, leathery skin. Their color ranges from reddish rust-brown to iron grey, with their bellies usually of a paler tone than their scales. Cerilian dragons are among the most ancient inhabitants of the continent, predating even elves and dwarves. Perhaps there used to be many, but over the years, in-fighting and fighting the younger races have taken their toll. There are only a half dozen dragons known to be left. All living dragons are of the Old age or higher. Dragons are extremely intelligent and knowledgeable, conserving much lore that has been lost to the younger races. They speak their own language and some can also speak Elven or Dwarven. Some of these dragons took part in the Battle of Deismaar, and the only verified alive and awake dragons right now are the dragon of Vstaive Peaks in Vosgaard, also known as Vore Lekiniskiy and Kappenkriaucheran who inhabits the Drachenward mountains and controls their magic. The most famous of the dragons is Tarazin the Grey who has not been seen for several decades when the official campaign begins. The only known Dracolich is Komassa who lives in the Shadow World. Dragons in Birthright are meant to be uncommon and powerful beings and only rarely if ever appear in any adventure.

== Chromatic dragons ==
Chromatic dragon is a classification of fictional dragon. Chromatic dragons are typically of evil alignment, in contrast to the metallic dragons, which are typically of good alignment. Chromatic dragons have played a large role in various D&D monster compilation books: white, black, green, blue and red dragons being the classic chromatic dragons. Tiamat is the queen of chromatic dragons, based on the Tiamat from Babylonian mythology.

=== Publication history ===
The classification of "chromatic dragons" was used in the Advanced Dungeons & Dragons second edition Monstrous Manual (1993), although the dragons comprising the category had been in print since the original Dungeons & Dragons "white box" set (1974). The term continued to be used in the third, fourth and fifth editions of the Monster Manual.

The German magazine Envoyer commented that the artistic rendering of dragons in the game evolved positively through the editions, (Note: The article compares the 3rd edition Monster Manual with earlier editions.) giving the different races more distinctive characteristics aside from color.

=== Red dragon ===
Red dragon
- First appearance: Dungeons & Dragons "white box" set (1974)
- Last appearance: Fizban's Treasury of Dragons (2021)

In-universe information
- Base of operations: Mountains or hilly plains
- Type: Dragon
- Distinctions: Breath weapon (cone of fire)
- Alignment: Chaotic Evil

Red dragons are the largest and most powerful of the classic chromatic dragons. They are very large with a wide wingspan and have two back-swept horns on their heads. Once they hatch, the wyrmlings are left to fend for themselves. A red wyrmling is roughly human-sized at hatching and dangerous. They are capable of breathing fire, and revel in wreaking destruction and havoc on almost anything that moves. The latter trait is carried fully into adulthood. They regard all other chromatic dragons as inferiors, with the amount of disdain proportional to the general power level of the variety. All other chromatic dragons that red dragons encounter are either killed, driven away, or bullied into servitude depending on the red dragon's mood and personality, with the exception of white dragons who are allowed to leave since red dragons do not consider them worth the effort to kill.

Due to their choice of living space, they cross paths with many of the metallic dragons, most notably the silver dragons who are their worst enemies, and holding the greatest disdain for copper dragons with whom they often clash. Red dragons have an eye for value, and can determine the monetary worth of any object at a glance. The gaining and keeping of treasure is the focus of a red dragon's adult life, and they tend to quickly amass incredible hoards. Red dragons prefer to make their homes inside active volcanoes. If a volcano is not available, they will reside in any mountain, provided that it has a good ledge from which the dragon can survey its territory. A red dragon's lair may have only a single entrance, high above ground level.

Red dragons are very dangerous in combat. Proficient in magic, they are also fast in the air, but clumsy, so prefer to fight on the ground. They spend years designing battle strategies, and wait until the best moment to call upon them. Their blasts of fire end most battles before they begin.

The red dragon Themberchaud, which first appeared in Drizzt Do'Urden's Guide to the Underdark (1999) and reappeared in subsequent modules such as Out of the Abyss (2015), was featured in the live-action film Dungeons & Dragons: Honor Among Thieves (2023).

David M. Ewalt described ancient red dragons' place in the game as "there are few beasts more powerful".

=== Blue dragon ===
Blue dragon
- First appearance: Dungeons & Dragons "white box" set (1974)
- Last appearance: Fizban's Treasury of Dragons (2021)

In-universe information
- Base of operations: Sandy deserts or coastal areas
- Type: Dragon
- Distinctions: Breath weapon (line of lightning)
- Alignment: Lawful Evil

Blue dragons are the second most powerful of the classic chromatic dragons. They have single large horns protruding from their heads and large, frilled ears. The tail is thick and bumpy. The wings are more pronounced than most other species.

They are more likely to be mocking and manipulative than cruel or murderous to 'lesser' creatures, aided by their natural talents for hallucination. They trick desert travelers into drinking sand or going miles out of their way. Blue dragons are mostly carnivorous though they will eat plants on occasion. Camels are the preferred food. They are enemies of brass dragons.

Blue dragons are unusual for chromatics in that they keep fairly well-ordered, hierarchical societies. Despite their evil nature, they are extremely good parents to their young, and rarely leave their eggs unattended. Blue wyrmlings are quick to taunt other creatures. They hunt small desert creatures for food. The typical blue dragon lair is dug into desert rock formations with two entrances: one at ground level, hidden by the sand, and the other opening onto a high ledge where it can perch and survey its territory. Each lair also has a cavern with a pool of water and sandy beach, which its inhabitant will use for drinking and relaxation.

The blue dragon excels at aerial combat. They discharge lightning at aerial foes, or at creatures on the ground. They are powerful at spell craft and adept at burrowing in sand. They often lie in wait just below the surface of the desert for prey. When they are burrowed, their large horns can be mistaken for pointed desert rocks.

=== Green dragon ===
Green dragon
- First appearance: Dungeons & Dragons "white box" set (1974)
- Last appearance: Fizban's Treasury of Dragons (2021)

In-universe information
- Base of operations: Forests with tall trees
- Type: Dragon
- Distinctions: Breath weapon (cloud of chlorine gas; changed to cone of acidic mist in Edition 3.5)
- Alignment: Lawful Evil

Green dragons are the third most powerful of the classic chromatic dragons. They have a large, waving crest or fin that starts at the dragon's nose and runs the length of the dragon's body. They also have long, slender forked tongues. They are highly adept at magic.

Green dragons are reasonably good parents, with the mother and father typically staying close to their eggs while they are incubating. The green wyrmling may be mistaken for a black one, due to their nearly black scales. As the wyrmling matures, its scales lighten in color. The wyrmlings typically stay with both parents until they reach adulthood.

A green dragon lair is normally a complex of caves and tunnels, with its main entrance hidden behind a waterfall. Green dragons prefer caves high up on a cliff. The territories of Green and Black dragons frequently overlap, but as green dragons are stronger, they typically hold the upper hand. Green dragons may allow a Black dragon to stay in their forest, as long as the lesser dragon remains in the swamps.

Green dragons revel in combat, and will often attack for no apparent reason. They are territorial, and may view any intrusion into their domain as an affront. They are cunning and duplicitous foes, and love to double-cross. A traveler who stumbles into a green dragon's territory might be able to bribe the dragon for safe passage, but the dragon may pretend to agree and then attack the offender once their guard is down. Though aggressive, green dragons prefer to use magic before attacking physically.

=== Black dragon ===
Black dragon
- First appearance: Dungeons & Dragons "white box" set (1974)
- Last appearance: Fizban's Treasury of Dragons (2021)

In-universe information
- Base of operations: Boggy swamps
- Type: Dragon
- Distinctions: Breath weapon (line of acid)
- Alignment: Chaotic Evil

Black dragons are the most vile-tempered and cruel of all chromatic dragons, apart from their love of bargaining. Black dragons are distinguished by their horns, which protrude from the sides of their heads and wrap around, projecting forward, a longer body and thinner tail. A large frill adorns the upper part of the neck.

Black dragons are fierce hunters that will normally attack from the water. They will often prey on fish, crabs, birds, turtles, crocodiles, lizardfolk, chuuls, hydras, and green dragons that are smaller and younger than they are. Their enemies include green dragons and swamp landwyrms. Black dragons are not noted as good parents. Their wyrmlings (babies) are exceptionally cruel with insatiable appetites for nearly anything organic. As a black dragon matures, its scales gradually grow lighter. The oldest black dragons appear almost purple in color. The name Cormyr's Purple Dragon knights stems from the legend of the great black dragon Thauglor, who once dominated the area encompassed by the present kingdom.

A black dragon typically resides in a large cave or underground chamber next to a swamp or murky pond. Their lairs always have two entrances: one underwater through the adjacent swamp/pond, and one above ground, disguised amidst the undergrowth. In combat, black dragons prefer ambushes to straightforward fighting. They are vicious and ruthless adversaries, and their acidic bile can easily work its way through the heaviest armor. Their wooded habitats prevent them from flying very high in combat.

=== White dragon ===
White dragon
- First appearance: Dungeons & Dragons "white box" set (1974)
- Last appearance: Fizban's Treasury of Dragons (2021)

In-universe information
- Base of operations: Arctic mountains
- Type: Dragon
- Distinctions: Breath weapon (cone of cold)
- Alignment: Chaotic Evil

White dragons are the weakest and the most feral of the classic chromatic dragons. Though dimmer than other dragons, they are still powerful enough to overwhelm most humans and have good long-term memories. Their heads and necks blend seamlessly into one another, and their wings are frayed along the edges. They have a flap of skin (dewlap) lined with spines under their chins. They have a high crest atop a streamlined head.

A newly hatched white wyrmling has clear scales, which become white as the dragon matures. They are expected to survive on their own after hatching, although some white dragon parents will permit their young to live in their lair until they reach adulthood. Adult white dragons have several abilities well suited to their arctic habitat. They can climb ice cliffs with ease, fly high and fast, and are exceptional swimmers. They love to swim in cold water. Much of their diet consists of aquatic creatures. White dragons are always hungry, and tend to become more savage as they mature.

Knowing they are the smallest and weakest of dragons, many white dragons harbor inferiority complexes. They take any opportunity to bully beings such as giants and younger dragons of other species. White dragons lair in ice caves dug into mountains. Their lairs contain many more tunnels and chambers than those of other chromatic dragons. White dragons are not strong combatants compared to other dragons. Their icy breath can freeze a foe solid. They avoid fights with more powerful dragons. White dragons also have exceptional memories, and will hunt down those who cross them, no matter how long it takes.

=== Other chromatic dragons ===
This is a list of dragons which are based on colors, but are not truly related to other chromatic dragons. In the 4th edition, the grey, brown, and purple dragons were released in the Draconomicon, but the grey and purple dragons were different. Instead of being based on the dragons listed here, they were based on the fang and deep dragons of the 3rd edition.

| Name | Characteristics | Notes |
|---|---|---|
| Brown dragon | Breath weapon: Line of acid; Terrain: Desert; Alignment: Neutral Evil | Ferocious and intelligent beasts from the Forgotten Realms campaign setting that come from the Raruin desert east of Mulhorand. They view humans as food and find it peculiar to talk with one's meal. They have no wings, but instead burrow in the desert sands with their webbed claws. They have a membranous frill that connects each row of spines down the length of the dragon's body allowing undulating flight through the air. |
| Grey dragon | Breath weapon: A caustic ooze that burns flesh and immobilizes victims; Terrain: Badlands, scrublands, dry prairies, and other flatland terrain; Alignment Chaotic Evil | Grey dragons are the most rapacious, venal, and brutish of the chromatics. Elder and ancient grey dragons have a special affinity with stone. They can exude a stony essence that petrifies foes. An ancient grey dragon's spikes have an elemental resonance that petrifies not only the dragon's primary targets, but also nearby creatures. |
| Orange dragon | Breath weapon: Explosive compound; Terrain: Jungle rivers and lakes; Alignment: Neutral Evil | Crafty predators who attack from ambush. They prefer to lurk in deep rivers and lakes. They are territorial and natural tyrants who seek to bring creatures in their area under their control. They bear a resemblance to monstrous, orange alligators. They first appeared in issue #65 of the magazine Dragon, where they were stated to be a crossbreed between the Red and Yellow dragons. They later returned in issue #248 of Dragon, now bearing the subname "Sodium Dragons". |
| Purple dragon | Breath weapon: A purple dragon's breath weapon can take on three different forms. It can manifest as a cone of energy, a burst of power, or a blade of energy.; Terrain: Underdark; Alignment: Lawful Evil | Long, lean bodied dragons with deep purple to midnight black scales. These fancy themselves to be the lords of all dragonkind, believing themselves arisen from the long dead sister of Tiamat. They are among the most intelligent of dragons, able to gather and control immense numbers of minions. Their energy-related attacks make them powerful fighters. They first appeared in issue #65 of the magazine Dragon, where they were stated to be a crossbreed between the Red and Blue dragons. They later returned in issue #248 of Dragon, now bearing the subname "Energy Dragons". |
| Yellow dragon | Breath weapon: Salt water; Terrain: Aquatic and coastal areas; Alignment: Chaotic Evil | Solitary and secretive dragons who prefer to lie in wait for prey to stumble into carefully prepared traps instead of hunting actively. They are among the most agile and quick of all dragons. Their breath weapon is a watery blast that contains a corrosive sodium compound. They adore water and will play in it. They first appeared in issue #65 of the magazine Dragon, where they were stated to be a lost "primary" chromatic, and the distant ancestor of the green dragon. They later returned in issue #248 of Dragon, now bearing the subname "Salt Dragons". An entirely different kind of yellow dragon native to the Forgotten Realms is described in the sourcebook FOR1: Draconomicon. |

=== Reception ===
The young adult black dragon was ranked first among the ten best mid-level monsters by the authors of Dungeons & Dragons For Dummies. The young white dragon was ranked eighth among the ten best low-level monsters by the authors of Dungeons & Dragons For Dummies. The authors chose the young white dragon over a wyrmling, feeling that "it's more satisfying for characters to battle against a dragon that's at least as big as a person, if not bigger. The young white dragon offers the best chance for this kind of fight". Dant et al. called the red dragon "deadly", and "one of the most fearsome and classic monsters" in role-playing games.

== Metallic dragons ==
Metallic dragon is a classification of dragon found in Dungeons & Dragons. In many campaign settings, metallic dragons are of good alignment. Bahamut is the deity of good-aligned dragons and metallic dragons, and currently the only known Platinum dragon in existence. Metallic dragons have played a large role in D&D's various monster compilation books, and for most of the game's history, five main types – brass, copper, bronze, silver, and gold – were presented as roughly analogous to the five types of chromatic dragons. The fourth edition of the second Monster Manual substituted iron and adamantine dragons for brass and bronze, and released the latter dragons in a later book alongside cobalt, mercury, mithral, orium, and steel dragons.

=== Publication history ===
The classification of "metallic dragons" was used in the Advanced Dungeons & Dragons second edition Monstrous Manual (1993), although the gold(en) dragon first appeared in the original Dungeons & Dragons "white box" set (1974) and the other dragons comprising the category had been in print since the first edition Monster Manual (1977). The term was continued in use in the third edition, fourth, and fifth edition Monster Manual.

=== Brass dragon ===
Brass Dragon
- First appearance: Greyhawk (1975)
- Last appearance: Fizban's Treasury of Dragons (2021)

In-universe information
- Base of operations: Desert, plains
- Type: Dragon
- Distinctions: Breath weapons (cone of sleep gas, line of fire)
- Alignment: Chaotic Good

Although weaker than many other varieties of dragonkind, brass dragons are still very powerful creatures. They act as mercenaries and often agree to serve as guardians or battle champions for anyone willing to pay well. Ancient brass dragons are some of the optimal sources of advice and most willing in the entire Prime Material Plane.

Physically, the brass dragon is highly distinctive. From below, its outstretched wings form a triangular shape, as they are attached to its body all the way to the tip of its tail. The wings are longest at the shoulder and taper gently as they reach the tail. Their scales seem to radiate heat and light. The shape of the head is quite unusual, as it includes a large, curved plate that extends from the dragon's eyes and cheeks on either side and curves upwards into two points, much like a plowshare. They have two sharp horns on the chin, which become steadily pointier as the dragon ages. They smell like hot, oiled metal. Brass wyrmlings probably learn to talk more quickly than the young of any other sentient species. As it matures, a brass dragon adds a love of fire to its love of speech. Though they have an extremely deadly breath weapon, they are more fragile than other dragons. As a result, they make alliances with small groups of intelligent creatures, such as tribes of nomadic Dragonborn.

The brass dragon prefers to dig its lair inside a desert peak or spire. They also prefer to have their lairs face eastwards, so that the rising sun will warm the lair for the bulk of the day. A brass dragon's lair is well-constructed and quite extensive, with many twisting corridors and dead ends to confuse and discourage hostile intruders along with bolt holes. The centerpiece of any brass dragon's lair is the Grand Conversation Hall, where it spends the majority of its time entertaining friends and visitors.

The brass dragon was an example of content misrepresented by the game's detractors. It was described erroneously as the worst of dragons.

=== Bronze dragon ===
Bronze Dragon
- First appearance: Greyhawk (1975)
- Last appearance: Fizban's Treasury of Dragons (2021)

In-universe information
- Base of operations: Aquatic, Tropical Islands
- Type: Dragon
- Distinctions: Breath weapons (repulsion gas, lightning)
- Alignment: Lawful Good

Duty-bound and honorable, bronze dragons commit themselves to order. Bronze dragons can seem arrogant and haughty, a tendency that can put them at odds with those they meet. Bronze dragons claim coastlines, inlets, and islands as their own, constructing lairs in coastal caves that have access to the sea. All bronze dragons share a hatred for blue dragons, and they are vigilant in protecting their homes from these interlopers.

Physically, the bronze dragon is quite fierce in appearance, despite its good nature. While most of its body is a reflective copper color, the wings are often tipped with green. The eyes of a bronze dragon begin with a green iris and as they age the eye slowly becomes a solid green with no distinct iris. The dragon has three main large horns protruding from each cheek, pointing back towards the tail. It also has a couple of smaller horns. The tips of these points are black and very sharp, and are often used for grooming. The tongue is purple-grey, long and pointed, and not forked. A large frill runs down the upper part of its neck.

Bronze dragons mate for life and they lay their eggs in a dry cave. Upon hatching, the wyrmlings are raised, taught, and protected by their parents. A newly hatched bronze wyrmling appears yellow with a tinge of green, and the scales will gradually shift to bronze as it matures. Bronze wyrmlings hold a strong sense of responsibility from the moment it leaves the egg. Given its exceptional abilities as a swimmer, the entrance to a bronze dragon's lair is quite naturally underwater, and often disguised with seaweed and coral. The bulk of the lair is above water level, however, consisting of multiple tunnels and large chambers, some as much as a thousand feet above sea level.

While bronze dragons are often fascinated with battles, especially fighting to defeat evil, they have strong moral compunctions against killing living beings unless absolutely necessary. They will typically join good-aligned armies to fight the forces of evil, either in human form or their own.

=== Copper dragon ===
Copper Dragon
- First appearance: Greyhawk (1975)
- Last appearance: Fizban's Treasury of Dragons (2021)

In-universe information
- Base of operations: Dry, rocky mountains or desert
- Type: Dragon
- Distinctions: Breath weapons (cone of slow gas, line of acid)
- Alignment: Chaotic Good

Copper dragons are the second weakest of the metallic dragons. They are born tricksters and jokesters.

Physically, the copper dragon is very striking, with scales of a warm copper color tinged with blue. Like the brass dragon, the copper dragon's wings connect to its body all the way to the tip of its tail. However, its wings have a pronounced bend to them, giving them the appearance of a "V" from below, rather than the brass dragon's triangular appearance. Copper dragons are powerful jumpers and climbers, with massive thigh and shoulder muscles. Their two horns are broad and flat, pointing backwards towards the tail from the top of their heads. They also have a distinctive frill protruding from either jaw. When the mouth is closed, the teeth are completely hidden.

When newly hatched, the scales of a copper wyrmling are a muddy brown in color, which gradually shifts to a glowing copper as it matures. Adult copper dragons are quite social, mainly due to the desire to play tricks upon each other. A typical copper dragon's lair is a cave, whose entrance is concealed by rocks and boulders. Upon entering, visitors find themselves in a huge labyrinth of tunnels. Copper dragons compete amongst themselves to see who can design the most confusing layout.

When it comes to combat, copper dragons prefer to avoid it. Rather than fighting openly, they prefer to taunt, humiliate, and tease their opponents until they simply give up and run away. Their ability to dramatically slow opponents often gives them ample time to run away. When forced, however, a copper dragon will fight to the very end, and is an incredibly devious antagonist.

=== Gold dragon ===
Gold Dragon
- First appearance: Dungeons & Dragons "white box" set (1974)
- Last appearance: Fizban's Treasury of Dragons (2021)

In-universe information
- Base of operations: Anywhere, although they prefer secluded lairs
- Type: Dragon
- Distinctions: Breath weapons (cone of fire, weakening gas)
- Alignment: Lawful Good

Gold dragons are based on creatures from Chinese mythology. In the game, they are the most powerful of the metallic dragons (in some versions they are the strongest of all dragons), and the most dedicated to defeating evil. They spend most of their lives in human form, seeking evil and punishing wrongdoers to the best of their considerable abilities. Gold dragons are also voracious learners who freely share their knowledge and experience.

Gold dragons have several large horns tipped with umber shoot sideways from their cheeks, and two very prominent horns point backwards along their heads. The most obvious feature is probably the tentacle whiskers that sprout from the top and bottom of the gold dragon's jaw, giving the appearance of a beard of sorts. Their wings, like those of brass and copper dragons, connect to the body all the way to the tip of the tail. From below, the overall shape resembles that of a brass dragon, but the different coloring and dramatic difference in size enables easy differentiation. When in flight, the gold dragon's wings ripple, giving the appearance of swimming rather than flying. A newly hatched gold wyrmling appears similar to an adult, except that it lacks horns or tentacle whiskers.

Gold dragons devote immense time and energy to the construction of their lairs. The layout of their lairs often resemble those of elegant human mansions, albeit buried underground. Unlike many species of dragons, gold dragons have a very firm and hierarchical social structure, encompassing all members of the species.

Gold dragons prefer to talk rather than to fight. While powerful opponents, they avoid unnecessary combat since they dislike killing.

=== Silver dragon ===
Silver Dragon
- First appearance: Greyhawk (1975)
- Last appearance: Fizban's Treasury of Dragons (2021)

In-universe information
- Base of operations: High mountains
- Type: Dragon
- Distinctions: Breath weapons (cone of cold, paralyzation gas)
- Alignment: Lawful Good

Silver dragons are the second most powerful of the metallic dragons, and are true friends to all. The silver dragon enjoys the company of humans and elves so much that it will often take the form of a human or elf and live among them for the majority of its life.

At first glance, the silver dragon appears very similar to the white dragon. Their wings are more curved though, and they have two talons on their wings rather than the single talon of most dragons. The silver dragon also has a frill that starts at the top of its head and flows all the way down its neck and body to the tip of the tail. The frill is silver towards the body, fading to a purple hue at the edge. They have two long, smooth silver horns with black tips, pointing up and back from the head. They also have a pronounced sharp frill under the chin, which has the rough appearance of a goatee. Silver dragons are extremely rare and elusive, preferring to take the guise of kind and elderly humanoids or very young humanoids.

Most silver dragons group together in "clans", a loose organization of dragons who choose to live together as a family. Clans take communal responsibility for protecting and raising their wyrmlings which are intelligent, kind, extremely curious, and adorable. A senior member of the clan may act as a leader, but no true leader actually exists. However, many silver dragons leave their clans for long lengths of time to live among non-dragons. Unlike the gold or bronze dragon, the silver dragon does not usually go out of its way to bring justice to the world. They are more interested in protecting the humanoids they have come to care for than in looking for evil.

Like most metallic dragons, silver dragons do not enjoy combat, and are averse to killing. If forced to fight, however, they are as deadly as any other dragon. Silver dragons' favored enemy are red dragons because these chromatic dragons are nearly always evil and have a talent for destruction. Additionally, silver dragons and red dragons favor the same sort of mountainous terrain for lairs, which leads to territorial disputes on top of having attitudes and philosophies at odds with the others'. A silver dragon's lair is generally found within an icy mountain, with the main entrance only accessible by air.

=== Rare types ===
| Name | Description |
|---|---|
| Adamantine dragon | Adamantine dragons are tacticians that supplement their melee abilities with blasts of thunderous power. They can be found anywhere, but prefer to lair in huge caverns. Regarding tactics, an adamantine dragon favors frontal assaults against a single target that it can take down quickly. When working with a group of allies, an adamantine dragon does not hesitate to bear the brunt of enemies' attacks. When fighting alone, an adamantine dragon attempts to isolate weaker foes first and finish them off quickly. |
| Cobalt dragon | Midnight blue dragons that could fire a breath weapon of pulsing, barely perceptible energy. These dragons, like the chromium dragons, were foul of temper, but subservient to iron dragons and their lord. |
| Mercury dragon | Mercury dragons are fast, relatively small (by dragon standards) creatures with long tails. They are very whimsical and make and change decisions quite often. At birth, its scales are dull silver. As the dragon ages they become brighter, and at adulthood they take on a mirror finish. Mercury dragons have one breath weapon, a line of superheated yellow light. Upon adulthood, however, they have a secondary attack of reflecting light at their opponent, changing it into a brilliant burst of dazzling brightness. In combat, they are unpredictable except that they will never attack good-aligned creatures unless provoked. They always use spells in combat, finding new and creative ways to use them. |
| Mithral dragon | Mithral dragons are among the rarest and most potent of the dragons. They claim themselves as the pursuers of Io's final vision. Choosing to live in the Astral Sea amongst the gods and angels, these dragons nevertheless pursue agendas and plots that put them into contact with creatures of the mortal world. Mithrals seek to further their own plans at any cost, and woe to the lesser creature that tries to thwart them. These dragons have visions of other times and spaces. Being native to the Astral Sea, mithral dragons are immortal and will not die unless slain in battle. |
| Orium dragon | Orium dragons live in jungles and rainforests in the ruins of past civilizations. They command lesser beings to rebuild the glories of the past and obtain the long-forgotten magic of fallen empires. To those under its protection, the orium dragon treat them as a monarch, wise but harsh. Those who threaten the dragon and his dreams of rebuilding his empire find themselves choking on its corrosive breath. This same breath coalesces into a smoky serpent that attacks at the dragon's command. |
| Steel dragon | The steel dragon's body seems somewhat feline, but its face has a humanlike quality. Spines that vaguely resemble hair and a beard ring its head and its scales shine like burnished steel. Steel dragons prefer human form to their own, so they are rarely seen in their natural forms. They routinely use their special abilities to infiltrate human society, typically masquerading as sages, scholars, wizards, and other intellectuals. Endlessly curious about the art, culture, history, and politics of civilized races, steel dragons live among humans and similar beings. Though they keep their true nature secret from the people with whom they mingle, they can always recognize each other. When a steel dragon hatches, its scales are a deep blue-grey color with steely highlights. As it grows to adulthood, its color lightens to a lustrous burnished steel, and its shine increases as it continues to age. In human form, a steel dragon always has one steel-grey feature, such as hair, eyes, or nails. In rare cases, this feature may be a ring, tattoo, or other ornamentation. In its natural form, a steel dragon smells of wet steel. Since they prefer human form, steel dragons rarely live in caves. Instead, they choose human dwellings such as mansions or castles. Such a home need not be opulent, but it must be large enough to accommodate a strongroom that will hold all the dragon's treasure. Steel dragons also prefer to dine in human form, but since they need to eat much more than humans do to maintain their true body mass, they make monthly trips to hunt in dragon form. These absences are always explained away in terms consistent with the roles they take in human society. For example, a steel dragon in the guise of a historian might claim to be exploring records in another city's library. Steel dragons prefer treasure that they can carry in their human forms, such as jewelry, valuable coins, and magic items usable by medium-sized creatures. They hate creatures that disrupt normal life in cities or despoil natural hunting grounds. Within a city, they usually rely on local authorities to deal with troublemakers, though they are quite capable of dealing out their own justice when such authorities cannot be relied upon to do so. Steel dragons tend to prefer swifter forms of justice in the wilderness. |

== Gem dragons ==
Gem dragons are a classification of dragon based on "gem type rather than color or metal". They are typically of neutral alignment with respect to good and evil, but some kinds are quite egoistic and awful company nevertheless. The Gem dragon family comprise Amethyst Dragons, Crystal Dragons, Emerald Dragons, Sapphire Dragons, and Topaz Dragons. Sardior is the deity of gem dragons. Although Obsidian Dragons are also technically gem dragons, they are opposed to Sardior and most other gem dragons.

=== Publication history ===
The gem dragons (the amethyst dragon, the crystal dragon, the emerald dragon, the sapphire dragon and the topaz dragon) and Sardior the Ruby Dragon first appeared in the first edition in Dragon #37 (May 1980).

The gem dragons appeared in the second edition in the Monstrous Compendium Fiend Folio Appendix (1992), and the Monstrous Manual (1993). They appeared as player character races in the Council of Wyrms set (1994) and the Campaign Option: Council of Wyrms book (1999).

The gem dragons appeared in the third edition in Monster Manual II (2002).

The sapphire dragon was introduced in the fifth edition as a stat block, along with some history on gem dragons, in a charity supplement to raise money for Extra Life. Gem dragons (amethyst, crystal, emerald, sapphire, and topaz) in full detail then appeared in the supplement Fizban's Treasury of Dragons (2021). SyFy Wire highlighted that "they have new abilities and breath weapons that use the less-common damage types of radiant, necrotic, thunder, psychic, and force. Fizban's contains stat blocks for gem dragons at different ages and challenge ratings, same as the dragons in the basic Monster Manual".

=== Amethyst dragon ===
Amethyst dragon
- First appearance: Dragon #37 (May 1980)
- Last appearance: Fizban's Treasury of Dragons (2021)

In-universe information
- Base of operations: Inner Planes, underground
- Type: Dragon
- Distinctions: Breath weapon (line of force; prior to edition 3.5, an explosive lozenge)
- Alignment: Neutral

The most powerful of the neutral gem dragons, amethyst dragons are honorable, regal creatures. At birth, these dragons have lavender skin with fine, translucent-purple scales. These scales darken as the creature grows older, eventually reaching a sparkling lavender color. These creatures approach life with a detached air, ignoring the conflicts of good and evil, law and chaos. At best, they see these conflicts as petty squabbles over inconsequential points of view, and not worthy of their time or consideration. These majestic dragons consider themselves to be the leaders of the gem dragons, and most of the lesser gem dragons acquiesce to this leadership – in everyday life and in the Council Aerie.

Amethyst dragons eat large quantities of fish and gems. They keep vassals to attend to their needs, though they do not place as many restrictions or requirements on them as other dragon lords do. Most keep at least one hidden, underwater cave for seclusion and secrecy. While amethyst dragons consider their silver and copper cousins to be foolish and have an active dislike of red and white dragons, they do not consider any life form to be their inherent enemies. They prefer to reason out a settlement through discussion and negotiation rather than through combat, but they can and will fight if they must.

=== Crystal dragon ===
Crystal dragon
- First appearance: Dragon #37 (May 1980)
- Last appearance: Fizban's Treasury of Dragons (2021)

In-universe information
- Base of operations: Inner Planes, temperate and cold mountains
- Type: Dragon
- Distinctions: Breath weapon (line of blinding light)
- Alignment: Chaotic neutral

Crystal dragons spend most of their time learning about the world around them. They value friendship over everything else and their treasures tend to be sentimental rather than valuable. They also welcome visitors who come with good intentions. Like other benevolent dragons, crystal dragons prefer to talk rather than fight. Hatchlings have glossy white scales that become more and more translucent with age. By the time they reach adulthood, these scales become luminescent in moonlight. In the full light of the day, they glow with a dazzling, almost unbearable brilliance.

Fun-loving and mischievous, crystal dragons tend to be irresponsible rulers. They establish domains in the cold, open northern reaches, building castles out of snow and ice. They leave these castles open to the sky because they love to watch the stars on clear, cold nights. The white dragon clans consider crystal dragons to be nothing more than prey, so the two types are almost always in conflict. However, it has also been known for crystal dragons to adopt white dragon hatchlings.

=== Emerald dragon ===
Emerald dragon
- First appearance: Dragon #37 (May 1980)
- Last appearance: Fizban's Treasury of Dragons (2021)

In-universe information
- Base of operations: Inner Planes, underground (prefers inactive or extinct volcanoes)
- Type: Dragon
- Distinctions: Breath weapon (powerful burst of wind)
- Alignment: Chaotic neutral

Emerald dragons live among the tropical islands. They are a curious species, taken to keeping track of history, lore and customs. They tend to be very reclusive, suspicious that others covet their treasure hoards and territory. Hatchlings have translucent green scales, which harden and take on many shades of green as they age. These scales are scintillating in the light, giving an emerald dragon's hide the appearance of being in constant motion.

A desire for privacy runs through the emerald clans, going so far as to determine where the dragon lords and their spawn establish lairs. The primary lairs consist of traps and alarms designed to warn the dragon of visitor and other threats. Emerald dragons prefer to quietly observe intruders and rarely emerge from hiding. When forced into combat, emerald dragons prefer to attack by ambush, using stealth and surprise attacks to quickly disable their enemies. If the threat is too great to handle, an emerald dragon will not hesitate to retreat. However, it will plan revenge, and its patience can last for centuries if necessary.

Emerald dragons have no compunctions about what they eat. They prefer lizards and giants, but they will eat anything if necessary. Of all the other types of dragonkind, emerald dragons get along best with sapphire dragons, often controlling parallel domains (emerald dragons taking the surface, sapphire dragons the subterranean areas below). They fear red dragons because of their well-known greed. Emerald dragons like the security and protection offered by a trusted partner and will take a single mate for a long time.

=== Sapphire dragon ===
Sapphire dragon
- First appearance: Dragon #37 (May 1980)
- Last appearance: Fizban's Treasury of Dragons (2021)

In-universe information
- Base of operations: Inner Planes, underground
- Type: Dragon
- Distinctions: Breath weapon (cone of panicking sound)
- Alignment: Lawful neutral

Sapphire dragons prefer subterranean domains. While most of the territory above their realms belong to the emerald dragons, they keep a small portion of the surface area as their own as well as the extensive caverns beneath the tropical jungles. Of all dragonkind, perhaps the sapphire dragon clans are the most militaristic. They fervently protect their territory from outsiders, going so far as to distrust anyone who even gets close to their borders. As most of the territory that interests the sapphire clans is below the ground, they rarely come into conflict with other dragon clans unless they attempt to take caverns currently in use. Only the black dragons compete with them for the tropical underground, and even they are wary of going into direct conflict with the armies of the sapphire clans.

From birth, sapphire dragons are beautiful, with scale ranging from light to dark blue in color, which sparkle in the light. Because of their coloration, they are sometimes mistaken for blue dragons. Giant spiders make up most of a sapphire dragon's diet, and great hunts are conducted in the tunnels to find these delicacies. While militaristic and warlike, the sapphire dragons are not quick to attack. They prefer to observe intruders (all visitors are intruders) so that they can plan how to deal with them. If a sapphire dragon or its treasure is ever threatened, it attacks immediately with its breath weapon, spells, and physical attacks. It uses psionics and special abilities to escape if faced with a more powerful foe. Sapphire dragons take a single mate for long lengths of time. However, sapphire dragons seek to possess a mate primarily to enhance their prestige and status.

=== Topaz dragon ===
Topaz dragon
- First appearance: Dragon #37 (May 1980)
- Last appearance: Fizban's Treasury of Dragons (2021)

In-universe information
- Base of operations: Inner Planes, any aquatic terrian
- Type: Dragon
- Distinctions: Breath weapon (cone of dehydration)
- Alignment: Chaotic neutral

Topaz dragons inhabit the coastal regions of temperate islands, building lairs below the waterline, though constructing them so that they remain dry. Clannish and self-seeking, these gem dragons usually want little to do with the other inhabitants of the isles. For the most part, these dragons neither seek company nor welcome it.

Out of the egg, a topaz dragon is a dull yellow-orange in color. With age, its scales harden and become translucent and faceted. When it reaches adulthood, a topaz dragon sparkles in the light of the sun. While topaz dragons enjoy the feel of sea wind and spray on their faceted-scale hides, they do not particularly like the water. They swim to hunt, attack, or reach their lairs, but not for enjoyment. They love to eat fish and other sea creatures, especially the giant squids that live in the Coral Sea.

Unless it specifically interests or affect them, topaz dragons tend to be indifferent to the causes and concerns that occupy the rest of dragonkind. While not malicious, topaz dragons are not the best of company or particularly pleasant to deal with. Besides caring little for social graces, they display erratic behavior that is unsettling and very confusing. They dislike visitors, but tend to avoid combat if they can help it. If combat is unavoidable, they use tricks and promises to distract their foes before striking with teeth and claws. They dislike bronze dragons. It takes time for a topaz dragon to accept another dragon's friendship, but once it does, it remains a friend for life. Once another dragon gets past its outer defenses and gruff exterior, it finds a loyal companion and ready protector in the topaz dragon.

=== Obsidian dragon ===
Obsidian dragon
- Based on: Dragon

In-universe information
- Base of operations: Warm mountains and underground, demiplanes
- Type: Dragon
- Distinctions: Breath weapon (cone of fire)
- Alignment: Neutral

Obsidian dragons, while the most intelligent of the gem dragons, are also the most vicious. They are extremely haughty, anger easily, and like to toy with prey before finishing it off. An obsidian dragon has smooth black skin with razor edges where joints come together. When first hatched, their scales are grey, rough to touch, and well defined. As they get older, the scales darken, become smoother, and begin to blend together.

Most obsidian dragons prefer to make their lairs around volcanoes or in one of the mountains of coal found on the Elemental Plane of Fire. Most great wyrms, though, make use of the genesis power to create their own demiplane.

=== Reception ===
Mark Theurer, in a 2002 review for Fictional Reality, remarked that gem dragons "have some interesting breath weapons".

Jennifer Melzer, for CBR in 2021 prior to the publication of Fizban's Treasury of Dragons, commented that "one of the most unique characteristics of the Gem dragons are their scales, which have the crystalline appearance of gemstones. They also tend to be psionic, meaning they are great masters of magical abilities of a psychic nature such as telepathy, psychokinesis and clairsentience". She stated that these dragons range in temperament and "while some of them enjoy (and even long for) conversation with intelligent creatures, they tend to be solitary, preferring to maintain their distance from the world and its problems in hopes that the world keeps its distance from them". Melzer also highlighted that back in third edition "obsidian dragons were the most intelligent and dangerous of the Gem dragons".

In ranking the dragons included in Fizban's Treasury of Dragons, Brooke Thomas of CBR listed gem dragons as #2. Thomas stated that these dragons were "likely opponents for the average campaign" unlike dragons towards the higher end of the challenge-rating range. Thomas considered gem dragons "exciting" due to "their versatility, utility, and contribution to world-building efforts".

== Other types of dragons ==
In most descriptions, true dragons only comprise the two families of chromatic dragons and metallic dragons. There are, however, many more families among the true dragons, and some kinds exist outside any specific category.

| Name | Description |
|---|---|
| Catastrophic dragons | Catastrophic dragons are typically of neutral alignment. They are Avalanche Dragon, the Blizzard Dragon, the Earthquake dragon, the Tornado Dragon, the Typhoon Dragon, Volcanic Dragon, and the Wildfire Dragon. Catastrophic dragons pay their homage to the Primordials as opposed to any other dragon deity. After the defeat of Io, there was a group of dragons that defected to the side of Primordials. The Primordials transformed these dragons into beings imbued with the elemental chaos. Metallic and Chromatic Dragons view Catastrophic dragons as aberrations. |
| Lung dragons | The Lung dragons, originally known as Oriental dragons, are all of neutral alignment with respect to good and evil. They are wingless creatures, and fly by innate magical means. Lung dragons can have any color despite their specific type. These dragons are derived from Chinese mythology. Oriental dragons appeared for the first time in the original Fiend Folio (1981), including the li lung (earth dragon), the lung wang (sea dragon), the pan lung (coiled dragon), the shen lung (spirit dragon), the t'ien lung (celestial dragon), and the yu lung (carp dragon). Two more were added in the 1st edition Oriental Adventures book, the chiang lung (river dragon) and the tun mi lung (typhoon dragon). The Lung dragons later appeared in the Monstrous Compendium Forgotten Realms Appendix (1989). These creatures appeared in third edition under the "lung dragon" heading in Oriental Adventures (2001). |
| Ferrous dragons | Ferrous Dragons are typically of lawful alignment. They are the Iron Dragon, the Nickel Dragon, the Tungsten Dragon, the Cobalt Dragon, and the Chromium Dragon. They originated in Dragon Magazine. All Ferrous dragons can sense ordinary metals and the lawful ferrous dragons have a strict hierarchy, with the higher dragons dictating the laws to the lower ones. The hierarchy, from highest to lowest, is iron, chromium, cobalt, tungsten, and nickel. Gruaghlothor is the supreme ruler of the ferrous dragons. |
| Chromium dragon | Appeared in Dragon #356. Shining, dull silver dragons that did not seem to match up in description to silver, steel, or mithril dragons were mentioned. These dragons had a breath weapon that fired forth freezing crystal. These Lawful Evil dragons appear to have a particularly malevolent nature to them. |
| Cobalt dragon | Appeared in Dragon #356. Midnight blue dragons that could fire a breath weapon of pulsing, barely perceptible energy. These Lawful Evil dragons, like the chromium dragons, were foul of temper, but subservient to iron dragons and their lord. |
| Iron dragon | Appeared in Dragon #356. Lawful Neutral which reside in hills and mountains containing iron ore. These dragons have a breath weapon of superheated sparks (fire and electric damage) and cone of sleep gas. |
| Nickel dragon | Appeared in Dragon #356. This form of Lawful Evil dragon had grey and white metallic scales and could breathe corrosive gas as a weapon. |
| Tungsten dragon | Appeared in Dragon #356. A species that appeared to be generally benevolent, there was a species of ferrous dragon, one whose breath weapon was composed of superheated sand and bludgeoning sand, that seemed especially set upon fighting chromatic dragons and other forms of powerful evil. This form of dragon has metallic scales that are a dull green with grey. |
| Planar dragons | Planar dragons inhabit the outer planes. These include: Shadow dragons which inhabit the Shadow Material Plane. Backstab reviewer Philippe Tessier commented on the combat power of the shadow dragon as it appeared in the video game Baldur's Gate II that it would "exterminates you in less than ten seconds if you attack it from the front." Another shadow dragon called Shimmergloom features as the ruler of a clan of duergar in the second book of the Icewind Dale Trilogy, Streams of Silver.; Adamantite dragons which reside in the Twin Paradises of Bytopia.; Arboreal dragons which reside in the Olympian Glades of Arborea.; Astral dragons, ectoplasmic dragons, and kodragons which reside in the Astral Plane.; Axial dragons which reside in the Clockwork Nirvana of Mechanus.; Battle dragons which reside in the Heroic Domains of Ysgard.; Beast dragons which reside in the Wilderness of the Beastlands.; Chaos dragons which reside in the Ever-Changing Chaos of Limbo.; Chole dragons which reside in the Infinite Layers of the Abyss.; Concordant dragons which reside in the Outlands.; Elysian dragons which reside in the Blessed Fields of Elysium.; Ethereal dragons which reside in the Ethereal Plane.; Gloom dragons which reside in the Gray Waste of Hades.; Howling dragons which reside in the Windswept Depths of Pandemonium.; Oceanus dragons which reside in the Upper Planes; Pyroclastic dragons which reside in the Bleak Eternity of Gehenna.; Radiant dragons which reside in the Seven Mounting Heavens of Celestia.; Rust dragons which reside in the Infernal Battlefield of Acheron.; Styx dragons which reside in the Lower Planes.; Tarterian dragons which reside in the Tarterian Depths of Carceri.; Hellfire Wyrms which reside in The Nine Hells of Baator. |

=== Lesser dragons ===
Lesser Dragons comprise all dragonkind that are not true dragons, and includes a broad range of creatures.

| Name | Description |
|---|---|
| Drakes | Drakes are a large family of Lesser Dragons. They look like miniature versions of the much larger true dragons and sometimes acts as guards for the true dragons. Most drakes are of animal intelligence and can not speak, but they also have breath weapons and can be a dangerous opponent. Drakes can be subdued, and some turn them into flying steeds or beasts of burden. |
| Elemental drakes | Elemental drakes are drakes most closely related to wyverns. They hail from the Elemental Planes, and are sometimes used as mounts by jann. Unlike wyverns, they are sentient.: Air drake – Chaotic neutral drake with air mastery and blinding sandstorm.; Earth drake – Lawful neutral drake with earth mastery and tremor.; Fire drake – Neutral evil drake with heat attack.; Ice drake – Chaotic evil drake with freezing touch.; Magma drake – Lawful evil drake with burn attack.; Ooze drake – Lawful evil drake with acid attack.; Smoke drake – Chaotic evil drake with smoke breath weapon.; Water drake – Neutral drake with water mastery and drench. |
| Dragonets | Dragonet is a common term sometimes used for all minute Lesser Dragons. They also technically include the Drakes.: Faerie dragons; Pseudodragons – Small dragon-like creatures that are stereotypically wizard's familiars. They can communicate telepathically and their main weapon is a stinging, poisonous tail.; Spiretop dragons |
| Landwyrms | Landwyrm is a family of Lesser Dragons that are mostly of an evil nature. They are cunning and can speak, but they have no wings and cannot fly. |
| Linnorms | Linnorms are ancient, primeval cousins of the true dragons. They lack wings and hind legs, making them more serpentine than true dragons. All known linnorms are evil and cruel. Linnorms are sometimes referred to as "Norse dragons". There are many subtypes of linnorms. Reviewer Mark Theurer remarked about Linnorm dragons that these giant "dragon-like beings that might best be described as feral dragons" really piqued his interest. He characterized the grey linnorm as "small [for a Linnorm dragon], that means HUGE, and very aggressive", the dread linnorm as "the largest and has two frickin' heads", and the Corpse Tearer as "old, smart, and vicious". |
| Wyverns | Wyverns have two legs and wings, and have no breath weapon. Instead, they have a poisonous barb at the end of their tails. |

== Critical reception ==
Dungeons & Dragons for Dummies assigned the dragon a central role, stating that for many characters "the opportunity to fight a dragon (and pillage its hoard) is the reason you play the game". The authors also chose a specific dragon each among the ten best monsters for low- and mid-level characters. Michael Witwer et al. observed that few dragons appeared in adventures published early in the game's history, however, due to their extreme danger to characters: "Dragons were great for book and box covers; in games they were impractical. There simply wasn't a playable D&D framework for including dragons as a regular feature." The Dragonlance setting was developed as one means to remedy this discrepancy.

Dungeons & Dragons allows players to fight the fictional dragons in the game (Tiamat being one of the most notable) and "slay their psychic dragons" as well.

Jon Peterson described dragons in D&D as greedy for treasure. He found it ironic, that they became the iconic creature to conquer for the characters, as accumulation of treasures was one major goal of the game - exactly what the folkloric and fantasy images of hoarding dragons preceding D&D warned against.

Similarly, Philip J. Clements wrote about Dungeons & Dragons: "Even the name suggests" that "both dungeons and dragons exist to be overcome and exploited by the power and cunning of the characters".

GameSpy author Allan Rausch commented on the improvements in the depiction of dragons in 3rd edition artwork: "Dragons were redesigned with an eye toward giving them distinctive characteristics that would work in their preferred environments -- making them distinctively D&D dragons."

The ancient blue dragon was ranked third among the ten best high-level 4th Edition monsters by the authors of Dungeons & Dragons 4th Edition For Dummies. The authors described the ancient dragons as "the most powerful versions of these majestic and deadly creatures, and the ancient blue dragon approaches the pinnacle of all dragon-kin", surpassed only by the red dragon. The authors concluded that "Few single challengers can stand long against the fury of this terrible dragon as it unleashes lightning and thunder."

Screen Rant compiled a list of the game's "10 Most Powerful (And 10 Weakest) Monsters, Ranked" in 2018, calling the prismatic dragon one of the strongest, saying "It represents the ultimate challenge for any party of adventurers, though it would easily dispose of all but the most insanely overleveled groups. Defeating a prismatic dragon would also represent the ultimate challenge for the actual players, as they would likely expire from old age before rolling all of the dice necessary to finish an encounter with the creature."

Inverse reviewer Corey Plante observed that the dragons' "foundational" nature for the game was given a counterpart in the in-universe lore by Fizban's Treasury of Dragons, where they are linked with the creation myth of the Material Plane, the part of D&D' "physical multiverse in which almost all D&D adventures take place".

== Other publishers ==
A dragon was the main antagonist in the early handheld electronic games licensed to Mattel, the Dungeons & Dragons Computer Labyrinth Game (1980) and Dungeons & Dragons Computer Fantasy Game (1981) and appeared in the Intellivision games Cloudy Mountain (1982) and Treasure of Tarmin (1983).

In 1981, Varanae published a supplement named Dragons detailing 50 new dragon types in the format of a Monster Manual. In 1986, a scenario also titled Dragons was published by Mayfair Games, with a war between good and evil dragons as backdrop, and including more background material about dragons.

The black dragon, blue dragon, brass dragon, bronze dragon, copper dragon, gold dragon, green dragon, red dragon, silver dragon, and white dragon are fully detailed in Paizo Publishing's book Dragons Revisited (2009).

== Other sources ==
- Wyatt, James and Rob Heinsoo. Monstrous Compendium: Monsters of Faerun (Wizards of the Coast, 2001).
- Andy Collins, Skip Williams, and James Wyatt. Draconomicon (Wizards of the Coast, 2003).
