= Tyranny of Dragons =

Dungeons & Dragons adventure

- Rules required: Dungeons & Dragons, 5th edition
- Character levels: 1-15
- First published: 2014 (separately), 2019 (in one volume)

Tyranny of Dragons is an adventure module for the 5th edition of the Dungeons & Dragons fantasy role-playing game. It consists of two adventures, Hoard of the Dragon Queen and The Rise of Tiamat.

== Summary ==
The adventure pits the player characters against Tiamat.

== Publication history ==
Hoard of the Dragon Queen was released on August 14, 2014 as part of the fantasy storyline called "Tyranny of Dragons", which launched alongside the new edition and is told through game supplements, video games, and other outlets. The first three chapters were also released as part of a free D&D Encounters kit for the D&D Adventurers League, the official organized play program by Wizards of the Coast.

The adventure was created by Kobold Press under commission from Wizards of the Coast.

The Rise of Tiamat was released on October 21, 2014 as the second adventure.

During San Diego Comic-Con 2019, Wizards of the Coast announced on their Twitch stream that a new edition of Tyranny of Dragons was scheduled to be released on October 22, 2019. This new edition repackages Hoard of the Dragon Queen and The Rise of Tiamat together as a single volume. It also includes a full errata, a reworked opening chapter, and new cover art from artist Hydro74. It was only available from local game and hobby stores. James Whitbrook, for Io9, reports that "the re-release incorporates player feedback from the first two releases to smooth out the progressive curve of the quests presented in Hoard of the Dragon Queen and The Rise of Tiamat, which will encompass all the tweaks and addendums made to how D&D fifth edition plays in the five years gamers have had their hands on it. As an included bonus, the book will also include extra resources for players and dungeon masters that were only previously available online, as well as a treasure trove of behind-the-scenes concept art made for the adventure that rivals even Tiamat’s most desirable loot".

Tyranny of Dragons was rereleased in January 2023 with new cover art that features Tiamat.

== Reception ==
David M. Ewalt for Forbes said that "Dungeons & Dragons has exploded in popularity since the 5th edition of the game was released in 2014, so many new players missed its first full adventures, Hoard of the Dragon Queen and Rise of Tiamat. This new compilation includes both, with lots of new art, to offer everyone a chance to face one of D&D's most feared antagonists."

John Farrell for GamingTrend gave the Roll20 edition of the compilation a score of 70 and said that "When you get down to it, there wasn’t much that Roll20 could add to this encounter set to improve its core issues. All they could do is precisely what they did do: make it a more palatable, convenient experience. And Roll20 did so with intelligence and creativity. Roll20 took every opportunity it could to make improvements, and this is definitely the best way to play these adventures if you choose to."

Shawn Ellsworth for Tribality said that "If you already own the previous books and don't collect special covers, you might want to save your money for other upcoming books like Eberron: Rising from the Last War. If you missed the original release and are interested in running a dragon adventure using a published or as a sourcebook for your own story, I'd recommend this book."

Dice Monkey said that "Tyranny of Dragons is a fantastic adventure that feels like a fresh classic. I imagine players 20 years from now talking about the adventures they had battling Tiamat's forces just like older players today talk about the classic 1st edition adventures they played in."
