= Doom of Daggerdale =

Dungeons & Dragons adventure module

- Authors: Wolfgang Baur
- First published: 1993

Doom of Daggerdale is an adventure module for the fictional Forgotten Realms campaign setting for the second edition of the Advanced Dungeons & Dragons fantasy role-playing game.

== Plot summary ==
The 32-page booklet is wrapped in a removable cover. Chapter 1: Introduction to Daggerdale, on pages 2–6, introduces Daggerdale, one of the Dalelands, including law and order and trade in the countryside. It also describes Dagger Falls, the largest town in Daggerdale, and some of its most important sites and settlements. Chapter 2: A Fever in Dagger Falls, on pages 7–14, begins with the characters travelling through Daggerdale to Dagger Falls. A group of riders led by the ruler of Daggerdale, Randal Morn, informs the characters that a strange fever called the Dream Fever is leaving the locals unable to wake up. The module reveals secretly to the Dungeon Master the real story behind the troubles. Eragyn the Dark, a priestess of the god Cyric, resurrected Randal Morn's great-grandfather, Colderan the Mage-Lord. Colderan began using a magic item called a net of dreams, which is what has been causing the Dream Fever by capturing a sleeper's life energy, and he also used it to trap Eragyn in his crypt. Chapter 3: The Eagle's Eyrie, on pages 15–19, details the Eagle's Eryie, a former dwarven outpost. The characters explore this abandoned outpost and its caverns on the way to the Mage-Lord's crypt. Chapter 4: The Mage-Crypt, on pages 20–30, leads the characters to explore the crypt, which is in the middle of town. The characters explore the crypt and eventually confront Colderan, recovering his sleeping victims (including Eragyn) if they are successful in defeating the Mage-Lord. Page 31 contains a description of a monster that serves the Mage-Lord, the nightshade, and page 32 contains four player handouts to be used during the adventure.

The inside front cover contains a list of the module's subplots in Daggerdale, while the inside back cover contains a map of the Mage-Lord's crypt.

== Publication history ==
TSR published the module, with Wolfgang Baur as the author. The book, with product code TSR 9391, was published in 1993. It featured cover art by Jeff Easley and interior art by Tony DiTerlizzi and Eric Hotz.

== Reception ==
John Setzer reviewed the module in a 1994 issue of White Wolf. He rated the game at 2 of 5 for Complexity, a 3 for Appearance, Concepts, and Value, and a 4 for Playability. He stated that it is a "solid adventure", giving it an overall rating of 3.5.
