= Kobold Quarterly =

Tabletop role-playing game magazine

- Frequency: Quarterly
- Publisher: Open Design/Kobold Press
- Founder: Wolfgang Baur
- Founded: 2007; 19 years ago
- Final issue Number: 2012 #23
- Country: USA

Kobold Quarterly was a roleplaying game magazine created by Wolfgang Baur and published by Open Design LLC.

== Content ==
Kobold Quarterly was published four times per year and focused on the Dungeons & Dragons role-playing game system. The headquarters of the magazine was in Kirkland, Washington.

The magazine occupied the gaming market niche once served by the Dungeon and Dragon magazines, and included interviews with game designers as well as supplemental game material. As of 2011, the magazine had three editors, including editor-in-chief Wolfgang Baur.

== Publication history ==
Dragon #359 (September 2007), would be the final print magazine published by Paizo Publishing, so on May 21, 2007, Wolfgang Baur announced that he would publish a new magazine for gamers, and Open Design soon published the first issue of the D&D 3.5E/d20 magazine Kobold Quarterly (Summer 2007). The first issue of the magazine was published in 2007. Kobold Quarterly #1 sold out of its small print run in September, and Kobold Quarterly #2 (Fall 2007) was produced in full-color and in larger quantities and so that it could be sold in game stores.

Kobold Quarterly #23 (Fall 2012) was published in October 2012, but on November 16, 2012, Baur announced that he was going to stop publishing the magazine. The magazine ended publication with issue #23, Fall 2012.

== Reception ==
The magazine has won multiple ENnie Awards.
