= Warlock of the Stonecrowns =

Dungeons & Dragons adventure module

- Rules required: AD&D 2nd edition
- Character levels: 4-6 or 7-10
- Authors: Wolfgang Baur
- First published: 1995

Warlock of the Stonecrowns is an adventure module for the Birthright campaign setting in the 2nd edition of the Advanced Dungeons & Dragons fantasy role-playing game.

== Plot summary ==
Warlock of the Stonecrowns is an adventure intended for a party of four to six player characters of levels between four and ten, in which the Warlock has been raising an army in his Citadel in the Stonecrown mountains, seeking vengeance against his awnshegh father the Gorgon by conquering neighboring domains or forcing alliances with them. The adventure includes various hooks to compel the characters to become involved, as well as their need to determine the cause of a sudden depletion of realm magic sources in these domains, because the Warlock has been using a magic cauldron to steal realm magic from them. The adventure includes a four-year chart which tracks each stage of his plan as the Warlock completes it, so the characters can come back to it whenever they are ready to deal with each stage.

Characters that travel to the citadel overland should encounter the army of the Warlock, although characters that find a network of caves and underground passages may experience other encounters along the way to the citadel. The adventure provides suggestions for each of the routes to the citadel, and the Dungeon Master can fill in the details.

The adventure includes a detailed description of the citadel, which is filled with both minions of the Warlock and his magical traps. The adventure gives the personality and behavior for each group of minions and important non-player characters. There is a shadow world adjacent to the citadel proper, and this utilizes the same map as the citadel itself; characters that travel to this shadow world can learn additional information but may encounter some powerful foes.

The climax of the adventure features a confrontation between the characters and the Warlock. The module outlines the deals he is prepared to make under the right circumstances and whether he will keep his word.

== Publication history ==
Warlock of the Stonecrowns was written by Wolfgang Baur and published by TSR in 1995.

== Reception ==
Cliff Ramshaw reviewed Warlock of the Stonecrowns for Arcane magazine, rating it an 8 out of 10 overall. Ramshaw had felt that too many Birthright adventures, "overly concerned with issues of nobility and politics, suffer from vagueness or over-linear plotting, but not this one. This one boasts action aplenty." He found the various hooks into the adventure were "all compelling", but felt that "the most likely is the players' need to investigate the sudden depletion of realm magic sources". He found that the Warlock's citadel "is pretty much as you'd expect (there's only so much originality you can apply to this sort of thing, after all) but is augmented by the Warlock's fiendish magical traps". He considered the shadow world an "interesting innovation" and felt that the encounters there were "some truly horrific foes". He called the Warlock "a bit of a monster" but noted that "in certain circumstances he's prepared to deal". Ramshaw concluded his review by saying: "This is an open-ended adventure blessed with a great deal of design attention, proving that detail is not inimical to freedom and that there's plenty of life left in the 'us chaps against the darklord' plot."

== Reviews ==
- Dragon #233
