= Council of Wyrms =

Dungeons & Dragons campaign setting

- Genre: Role-playing games
- Publisher: TSR
- Publication date: 1994
- Media type: Boxed set
- Pages: 194

Council of Wyrms is a boxed set introducing a campaign setting for the 2nd edition of the Advanced Dungeons & Dragons fantasy role-playing game published in 1994.

== Contents ==
The Council of Wyrms boxed set provides all the rules and background material necessary for staging adventures with dragon player characters. The dragon's color substitutes for race and class, with the addition of proficiencies (such as Chanting, Looting, Religion) and a character kit (including Dragon-Mage, Dragon-Priest, Dragon-Psionicist). Players also may experiment with half-dragon PCs, spawned from the union of polymorphed dragons and their demihuman vassals. The adventures of this setting occur in the Io's Blood Isles, a string of islands in a self-contained world.

The Council of Wyrms boxed set includes rules for playing dragon, half dragon, and dragon servant characters. It includes three rule books: one for the base rules, one for dragon family and clan histories, and one for adventure modules. The setting of the campaign is a chain of islands called Io's Blood Isles. These islands represent all major climates. It is separated from the rest of its fictional world by very large oceans.

The dragons on the islands are described as having a loose democratic government with a caretaker. Each dragon clan with a wyrm level dragon gets a vote on issues before the Council of Wyrms. The caretaker only gets a vote on tied issues. Thus dragonkind cooperates and makes decisions on issues affecting dragon welfare.

Humans are not native to the islands, and those humans who come to the islands are mostly adventurous dragon slayers.

According to the draconic myth described in the setting, the islands were created by the dragon god Io. Seeing his children, the dragons, engulfed in dragon war, Io cried out: "If dragon blood must be spilled, then let it be mine!" He then slashed open his belly with his own claws and spilled his blood into the oceans. The divine blood solidified and became a chain of islands. These islands Io gave to the dragons, hoping that they would be able to live there in peace.

The dragons failed to live together peacefully. Almost as soon as they had moved to the new islands, they began their brutal conflicts over petty grievances once more. Io came up with a second plan to bring the dragons together. He hoped to unite them against a common enemy. Io sent to the humans an icon of his power, an avatar. He told them dragon secrets and gave them powers to slay dragons with. He then commanded them to construct a great fleet and sail across the ocean to rid the blood islands of dragons. With his plan complete, Io watched from his plane of existence.

The humans arrived on the Io's Blood Isles and immediately began to systematically eliminate all dragons. The dragons were forced to end their wars and fight the common enemy: humans. The dragons were almost eliminated, but they managed to drive off the invaders, but only by working together. Io's heart warmed. He had finally forced the dragons to make peace, but for the third time, the dragons started warring once more. Io was furious. After he had done so much for them, they spit in his face. He was ready to try one more plan, and if that didn't work, then he would abandon the dragons forever.

Io sent visions to three different dragons, paragons and leaders of their various races (being chromatic, gem, and metallic). The gem dragon received a vision of a great council, where dragons may discuss disputes and resolve matters peacefully. The chromatic dragon had a dream of a fighting arena, where unresolved problems would be solved via a duel of strength, where whichever dragon landed first would lose. The metallic dragon had a dream of a hatchery where all dragon eggs were together, born amongst each other, seeing themselves as kin. The three dragons came together and discussed their visions. In the end, they worked together to create the Council of Wyrms. Peace reigned and dragon war ended.

== Publication history ==
The Council of Wyrms boxed set was designed by Bill Slavicsek, and published by TSR, Inc.

In 1999 the setting was slightly revised and reprinted as a hardcover book.

== Reception ==
Rick Swan reviewed Council of Wyrms for Dragon magazine #213 (January 1995). He recommended this set for anyone who was "an AD&D game player who's had your fill of wizards, who's fed up with fighters, who doesn't care if he ever lays eyes on another thief". Swan did conclude that the set "doesn't lend itself to long campaigns, since dragon PCs are too disruptive to function in traditional AD&D settings [...] But as a change of pace, the Council of Wyrms set is a roaring success".

Council of Wyrms won the Origins Award for Best Roleplaying Adventure of 1994.
