= The Year of Rogue Dragons =

The Year of Rogue Dragons is a series of novels set in the Forgotten Realms campaign setting.

== Plot summary ==
The series explores the ancient secrets of dragons and their society.

== Contents ==
The series contains a trilogy of novels written by Richard Lee Byers, as well as two anthologies of short stories written by various authors.

- The Rage, by Richard Lee Byers (paperback, April 2004, ISBN 978-0-7869-3187-3)
- The Rite, by Richard Lee Byers (paperback, January 2005, ISBN 978-0-7869-3581-9)
- The Ruin, by Richard Lee Byers (paperback, May 2006, ISBN 978-0-7869-4003-5)
- Realms of the Dragons, edited by Philip Athans (paperback, October 2004, ISBN 978-0-7869-3394-5)
  - "Soulbound", by Paul S. Kemp
  - "First Flight", by Edward Bolme
  - "Gorlist's Dragon", by Elaine Cunningham
  - "The Keeper of Secrets", by Ed Greenwood
  - "The Topaz Dragon", by Jess Lebow
  - "Wickless in the Nether", by R. A. Salvatore
  - "Serpestrillvith", by Richard Baker
  - "Waylaid", by Thomas M. Reid
  - "Standard Delving Procedure", by Lisa Smedman
  - "An Icy Heart", by Voronica Whitney-Robinson
  - "Penitential Rites", by Keith Francis Strohm
  - "How Sharper Than a Serpent's Tooth", by Dave Gross
  - "Beer with a Fat Dragon", by Don Bassingthwaite
  - "The Prisoner of Hulburg", by Richard Lee Byers
- Realms of the Dragons II, edited by Philip Athans (paperback, May 2005, ISBN 978-0-7869-3808-7)
  - "Faerie Ire", by Erin Tettensor
  - "The Woman Who Drew Dragons", by Rosemary Jones
  - "The Hunting Game", by Erik Scott de Bie
  - "The Road Home", by Harley Stroh
  - "How Burlmarr Saved the Unseen Protector", by Kameron M. Franklin
  - "A Tall Tale", by J.L. Collins
  - "The Book Dragon", by Jim Pitrat
  - "Freedom's Promise", by Ed Gentry
  - "Possessions", by James P. Davis
  - "Queen of the Mountain", by Jaleigh Johnson
  - "The Strength of the Jester", by Murray J.D. Leeder

The Year of Rogue Dragons trilogy was later reprinted as an omnibus in The Year of Rogue Dragons (paperback, October 2010, ISBN 978-0-7869-5574-9).

== Reception ==
Year of Rogue Dragons appeared on the 2024 Game Rant "31 Best Dungeons & Dragons Novels, Ranked" list at #26.
