= Dungeons & Dragons Computer Fantasy Game =

1981 video game

- Publisher: Mattel
- Designer: Peter Oliphant
- Platform: Handheld
- Release: 1981
- Genre: Adventure

Dungeons & Dragons Computer Fantasy Game is a handheld electronic game released by Mattel in 1981. Designer Peter Oliphant claims that it was one of the more basic projects he worked on during his career.

== Release ==
The Dungeons & Dragons Computer Fantasy Game was released in the fall of 1981. Mattel stated that the game immediately sold out, setting it apart from some of Mattel Electronics' more well-known sports-themed handhelds.

== Display ==
The game unit is a portable game with an LCD screen, and is powered by watch batteries.

The game opens with an isometric view of a simple 3D dungeon. The player is represented by a minor character who appears to be holding a sword aloft. The protagonist is at a crossroads in four passageways. The character's placement is indicated by an expanded letter and number, which always starts at A0. A cursor button moves a black arrow in one of four directions, while a move button moves the surface in the same way.

The character that the player would be controlling and the maze are depicted in the bottom left corner of the tiny screen, giving room for other icons that indicate when other items and monsters are nearby in one of the four directions. This contains a bat that can randomly pick the character up and place the character elsewhere in the maze. There is also a pit that will kill the character if the character does not have a rope to pull the character out of the pit. The rope occurs at the beginning of the game's most accessible setting, in the dungeon in the intermediate location, and there is no rope in the most challenging environment.

== Gameplay ==
The LCD screen displayed a dungeon junction in quasi-three dimensions, coupled with hints of routes that the player may explore further. Each intersection also featured a number and letter designation, allowing the player to create a map while searching. The dungeon itself was made up of 100 squares laid out in ten rows of ten, but because the dungeon circled around itself, if the player were to walk beyond the edge in any direction, the character would resurface at the other edge.

The gameplay is similar to Hunt the Wumpus, in that the player moves through a maze, must beware of bats and pits, and must find an arrow and shoot it at the dragon without entering its lair directly. To win, the player must first find the magical arrow, then the dragon, and then shoot it with the weapon while in another room.

Every few seconds, an ominous four-tone piece of music plays as the player navigates through the maze. Each movement is accompanied by a tapping sound that is meant to indicate movement. The player will hear a descending sound followed by a few notes from a death dirge if the character falls into a pit. Unlike Hunt the Wumpus, D&D's gameplay takes place on a ten by ten grid, with each square representing a different room.

The positioning of the dozen pits, the magical arrow, rope, and dragon are determined at random in each game. When the player wins, the player is given a score based on how long it took to complete the game, with one point provided for every five seconds. With its off-set LCD screen and weird graphic of white-outlined cobblestones, the entire game is approximately the size of an inch-thick or so credit card. According to Oliphant, the game was much easier to code because it was turn-based and followed a set of rules rather than relying on real-time activity.

Oliphant felt that the layout and LCD art were fantastic for a turn-based game, and was pleased with the final product.

While he was working on the prototype, another group was in charge of programming the production version that was presented to the market. He does recall, though, that it was a system with limited memory that made full use of it.

Oliphant said that the game was not as difficult to make in comparison to some of his past projects.

Oliphant believes Mattel Electronics sought to venture out from its usual sports games for this handheld in order to get numerous different licenses for new properties in order to widen the type of games they were developing. As a result, licensed games like Battlestar Galactica, Flash Gordon, and Masters of the Universe were developed, as well as non-licensed oddities like Chess, Backgammon, and the Horoscope Computer.

== Reception ==
Electronic Games in 1983 wrote that Dungeons & Dragons "is sure to win your heart". The magazine liked the gameplay and sound effects, and concluded that it "is an exciting and novel approach to the famous fantasy game".

== See also ==
- Dungeons & Dragons Computer Labyrinth Game, Mattel's previous Dungeons & Dragons game
