= Kobold Press =

Game publisher

- Formerly: Open Design LLC
- Type: Private
- Industry: Role-playing games, magazines
- Founded: 2006; 20 years ago
- Founder: Wolfgang Baur
- Products: Kobold Quarterly, Kobold Guides, Hoard of the Dragon Queen, The Rise of Tiamat
- Brands: Midgard Campaign Setting
- Website: Official website

Kobold Press, also known as Open Design, is an American game company that produces role-playing games and game supplements.

== History ==
Wolfgang Baur launched Open Design in 2006. Open Design funded projects using a crowdfunding model dubbed "patronage," with the resulting products available exclusively to backers through PDF releases and limited print runs. The first product published by Open Design was Steam & Brass (2006), a steampunk-themed adventure module using the d20 System. Steam & Brass was also the first product set in Baur's setting of Zobeck, later known as Midgard.

In 2007, Baur launched Kobold Quarterly through Open Design, which filled in the gap in the role-playing industry left by the end of Paizo Publishing's run on the magazines Dragon and Dungeon. Unlike previous projects from the company, Kobold Quarterly was available to the public. Kobold Quarterly ran for 23 issues, with the final issue produced in October 2012.

Open Design began to shift away from a focus on the "patronage" model in 2008, releasing titles such as the Zobeck Gazetteer (2008) to the public, and began publishing products entirely outside the "patronage" model in 2011, including a series of game design guidebooks. In 2012, Open Design began producing books under the imprint "Kobold Press"; by the end of the year, the company had ceased publishing as Open Design and exclusively published products as Kobold Press.

In 2014, Wizards of the Coast commissioned Kobold Press to create the two adventures for the initial Tyranny of Dragons storyline for Dungeons & Dragons 5th Edition, Hoard of the Dragon Queen (2014) and The Rise of Tiamat (2014).

Leaked documents from Wizard of the Coast in January 2023 suggested that Wizards planned to change the Open Game License (OGL), developed for its Dungeons & Dragons products, to be more restrictive and potentially harm third-party content creators. In response to the OGL leak, Paizo announced plans to develop a new license called the Open RPG Creative License (ORC) – this would be an open, perpetual, and irrevocable system-agnostic license stewarded by a nonprofit. Additional publishers, such as Kobold Press, will also be part of the ORC development process. Polygon reported that "in the weeks that Hasbro spent publicly flailing, customers spent an extraordinary amount of money investing in its competition". Kobold Press informed Polygon "that its sales quadrupled in January".

== Games and products ==
As Open Design, the company's products included the magazine Kobold Quarterly; a line of game design guidebooks, such as The Kobold Guide to Board Game Design (2011) and The Complete Kobold Guide to Game Design (2012); and a number of "patronage"-funded adventures and sourcebooks, many of which were set in the Midgard setting. The Midgard Campaign Setting was originally published in 2012.

As Kobold Press, the company continues to produce game design guides and material for the Midgard setting, and has moved to Kickstarter to fund additional projects. In 2017, the company ran a Kickstarter to update the Midgard setting with a new edition of the Midgard Campaign Setting (2018); this book is "useable with any fantasy roleplaying system". This Kickstarter also included supplements for specific role-playing game systems such as Midgard Player's Guide for Pathfinder RPG (2018) and Midgard Heroes Handbook for 5th Edition (2018). The company has published other titles compatible with the Pathfinder Roleplaying Game including Deep Magic, Southlands, and the Advanced Races Compendium. Kobold Press has released many Midgard projects compatible with Dungeons and Dragons 5th Edition such as Midgard Heroes for 5th Edition (2015) and Midgard Worldbook for 5th Edition (2021). Compatible adventures and supplements in the Midgard setting have also been released for 13th Age and the AGE System.

On January 10, 2023, Kobold Press announced that it was developing an "available, open, and subscription-free" ruleset for tabletop role-playing games codenamed Black Flag. Christian Hoffer, for ComicBook.com, stated that "the announcement is a clear pushback against recent rumored changes to the Open Game License, which provides the framework for publishers such as Kobold Press to make material compatible with Dungeons & Dragons. Kobold Press is one of the largest publishers of third-party D&D 5E material" and "is one of the publishers likely to face the most challenges under the OGL 1.1". In April 2023, Kobold Press announced that this project will be titled Tales of the Valiant and that the game will be built off the Dungeons & Dragons 5th Edition portion now under the Creative Commons license. It will launch with a Kickstarter in May 2023 to crowdfund the Player's Guide sourcebook and the Monster Vault sourcebook.

== Awards and nominations ==
Year	Award	Category	Work	Result	Ref.
2012	Origins Awards	Best Game-Related Publication	The Kobold Guide to Board Game Design	Won	
2012	ENNIE Awards	Best Adventure	Streets of Zobeck	Gold Award	
2012	ENNIE Awards	Best Art, Interior	Book of Drakes	Nominated	
2012	ENNIE Awards	Best RPG Related Product	Complete Kobold Guide to Game Design	Gold Award	
2012	ENNIE Awards	Best Writing	Your Whispering Homonculous	Nominated	
2013	ENNIE Awards	Best RPG Related Product	Kobold Guide to Wordbuilding	Gold Award	
2013	ENNIE Awards	Best Writing	Kobold Guide to Wordbuilding	Gold Award	
2013	ENNIE Awards	Best Setting	Midgard Campaign Setting	Nominated	
2013	ENNIE Awards	Best Supplement	Dark Roads & Golden Hells	Nominated	
2014	ENNIE Awards	Best Aid/Accessory	Kobold Guide to Magic	Nominated	
2014	ENNIE Awards	Best Monster/Adversary	Midgard Bestiary: 13th Age Roleplaying Game Compatible Edition	Nominated	
2014	ENNIE Awards	Judges' Spotlight Winners	Deep Magic	Won	
2016	ENNIE Awards	Best Cartography	Southlands Campaign Setting Map	Nominated	
2016	ENNIE Awards	Best Setting	Southlands Campaign Setting	Silver Award	
2017	ENNIE Awards	Best Aid/Accessory	Kobold Guide to Plots & Campaigns	Silver Award	
2019	ENNIE Awards	Best Monster/Adversary	Creature Codex for 5th Edition	Silver Award	
2019	Origins Awards	Roleplaying Supplement	Creature Codex for 5th Edition	Nominated	
2019	Origins Awards	Roleplaying Games	Midgard Worldbook	Nominated	
2022	ENNIE Awards	Best Cartography	Scarlet Citadel Map Folio	Nominated	
2022	ENNIE Awards	Judges' Spotlight Winners	Kobold Guide to Monsters	Won	
2023	ENNIE Awards	Best Cartography	Campaign Builder: Cities & Towns Map Folio	Nominated	
2024	ENNIE Awards	Best RPG Related Product	KOBOLD Guide to Roleplaying	Silver Award	

== Publications ==
Dungeons & Dragons 5th Edition

Midgard

- Limited Edition Tales of the Old Margreve for 5th edition (2019)
- Tales of the Old Margreve for 5th Edition (2019)
- Necropolis of the Mailed Fist for 5th Edition (2019)
- Enigma Lost in a Maze for 5th Edition (2019)
- Courts of the Shadow Fey Handouts
- Courts of the Shadow Fey for 5th Edition (Limited Edition) (2019)
- Courts of the Shadow Fey for 5th Edition (2019)
- 12 Peculiar Towers for 5th Edition (2018)
- Midgard Sagas for 5th Edition (2018)
- Zobeck Gazetteer for 5th Edition (2018)
- Tomb of Mercy for 5th Edition (2018)
- Midgard Worldbook for 5th Edition and PFRPG (2018)
- Midgard Heroes Handbook for 5th Edition (2018)
- Shadows of the Dusk Queen for 5th Edition (2018)
- Eldritch Lairs for 5th Edition (2018)
- Wrath of the River King (5th Edition) (2018)
- Streets of Zobeck for 5th Edition (2017)
- Demon Cults & Secret Societies for 5th Edition (2017)
- Grimalkin (5th Edition) (2016)
- Blood Vaults of Sister Alkava for 5th Edition (2016)
- Unlikely Heroes for 5th Edition (2016)
- Last Gasp (5th Edition) (2015)
- Tomb of Tiberesh (5th Edition) (2015)
- Cat & Mouse (5th Edition) (2015)
- Midgard Heroes for 5th Edition (2015)
- Southlands Heroes for 5th Edition (2015)

Other Sourcebooks & Adventures

- Tome of Beasts III for 5th Edition (2022)
- Tome of Beasts II for 5th Edition (2020)
- Deep Magic for 5th Edition: A Tome of New Spells & Arcana (2020)
- Warlock Grimoire for 5th Edition (2019)
- Creature Codex Lairs for 5th Edition (2018)
- Creature Codex for 5th Edition (2018)
- Prepared 2: A Dozen One-Shot Adventures for 5th Edition (2017)
- Items Wondrous Strange PDF (5th Edition) (2017)
- Demon Cults & Secret Societies for 5th Edition (2017)
- Prepared! A Dozen Adventures for 5th Edition (2016)
- Sanctuary of Belches for 5th Edition (2016)
- Book of Lairs for 5th Edition (2016)
- Tome of Beasts for 5th Edition (2016)
