= Wolfgang Baur =

American game designer

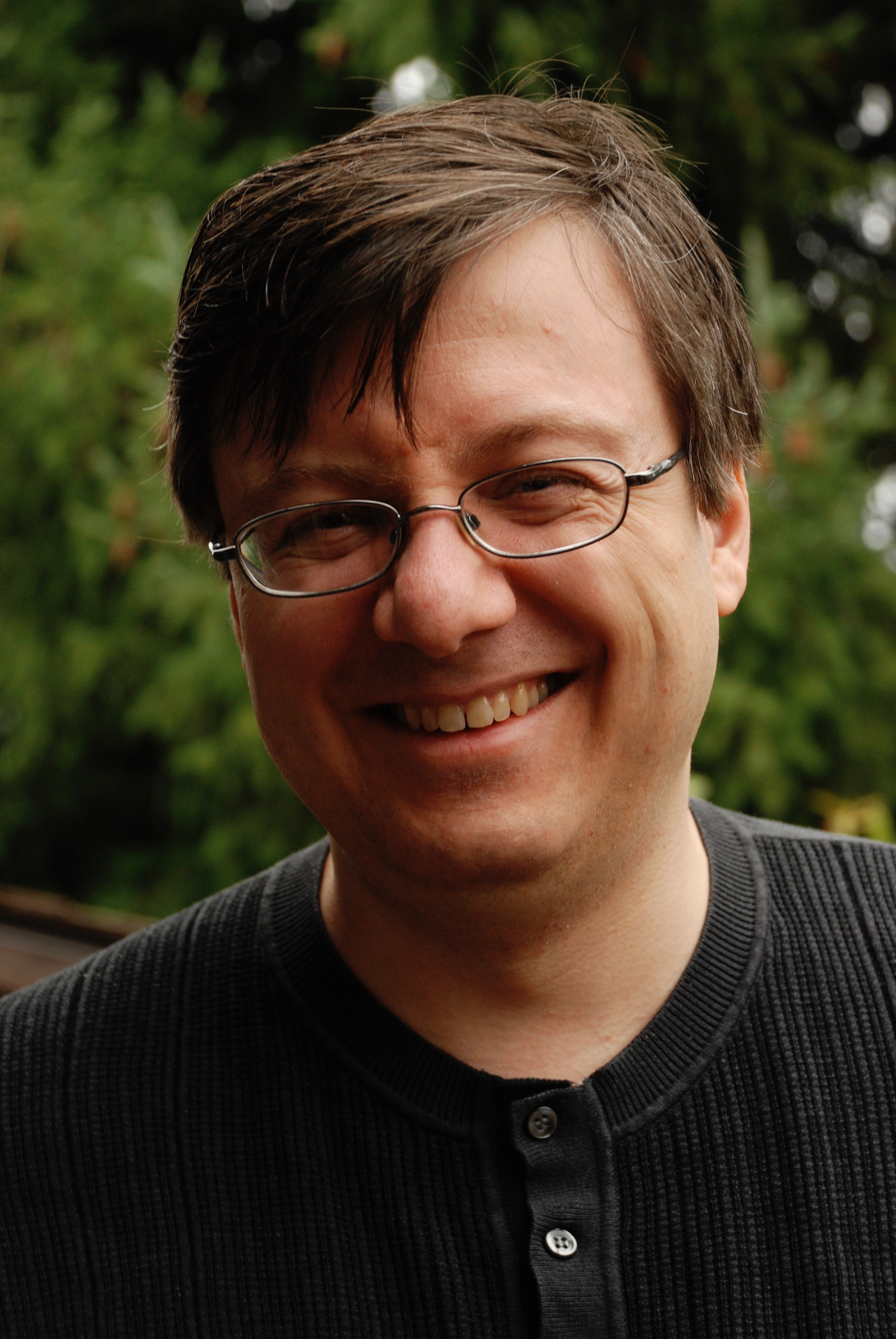
- Portrait of author, game designer, editor, publisher Wolfgang Baur, dated November 28, 2009.
- Born: 1968 (age 57–58); Illinois, United States
- Occupations: Game designer, writer

Wolfgang Baur (born 1968) is an American game designer, best known for his work with Dragon magazine. He designs role-playing games and is known for his work at Wizards of the Coast. Baur is also the founder of Open Design LLC, later known as Kobold Press.

== Biography ==
Wolfgang Baur was born in a suburb of Chicago, and later attended the University of Illinois and then Cornell University for graduate studies in biochemistry and molecular biology to pursue an academic career in research. When he ran out of funding in 1991, Baur took a temporary job as assistant editor to Barbara Young at Dungeon magazine: "By the time my scholarship was reinstated, I didn't want to go back... I'd been writing for Dungeon Adventures and Iron Crown, but this was an opportunity to work in a field I loved."

Baur was involved in many projects at TSR as either designer or editor, including Dungeon and Dragon magazines, the Planescape (Planes of Law, Planes of Chaos), Al-Qadim (Secrets of the Lamp, Assassin Mountain), and Birthright settings (Warlock of the Stonecrowns), editing the Star*Drive setting, Dataware, and Doom of Daggerdale. Baur also worked for Iron Crown Enterprises on books such as Treasures of Middle-earth. Baur also worked on the Dark•Matter setting for the Alternity science fiction role-playing game. His roleplaying game titles include Frostburn, Expedition to the Demonweb Pits, Book of Roguish Luck, Castle Shadowcrag, and Empire of the Ghouls.

Baur was the "Kobold-in-chief" for Open Design LLC (which changed its name to Kobold Press in 2012), and was editor-in-chief of its quarterly periodical Kobold Quarterly. Open Design published Kobold Quarterly #1 (Summer 2007) before the final print issue of Dragon. Baur stated on July 17, 2008, that the Game System License was "absolutely terrible for Kobold Quarterly", as the periodical would be unable to publish material for both D&D third edition and fourth edition. He won the eighth annual Diana Jones Award for Excellence in Gaming in 2008. Kobold Quarterly and Open Design won five ENnie Awards in 2009.

Baur is a member of the Alliterates (a group of local and national authors), and serves as a judge for the RPG Superstar competitions, as part of a three-judge panel of respected figures from the field.

== Media mentions ==
Wolfgang has appeared in the following newspaper and magazine articles, websites and podcasts.

=== Podcasts ===
- Atomic Array: Wolfgang appeared on these episodes: 009 (Kobold Quarterly 007), 015 (Kobold Quarterly 008), and 021 (Kobold Quarterly 009).
- Open Design: Co-host with Ed Healy and Rone Barton. The official podcast for Wolfgang's publishing company.
- RPG Countdown: Wolfgang appeared on these episodes: April 22, 2009 (Kobold Quarterly 009), November 6, 2009 (Kobold Quarterly 011).
