= Tiamat (Dungeons & Dragons) =

Dragon deity from Dungeons & Dragons

- Dungeons & Dragons character
- Tiamat on the cover of the rereleased 5th Edition module Tyranny of Dragons (2023)
- First appearance: Greyhawk (1975)
- Last appearance: Tyranny of Dragons (2019)
- Created by: Gary Gygax and Rob Kuntz
- Voiced by: Frank Welker; Tracey Wiles
- Appearances in other media: Dungeons & Dragons (1983–1985); Secret Level (2024)

In-universe information
- Aliases: Takhisis (Dragonlance, debated)
- Race: Deity
- Gender: Female
- Titles: The Chromatic Dragon, Creator of Evil Dragonkind; The Avaricious; The Dragon Queen (or the Dragonqueen); The Prime Evil; The Great Dragon; The Embodiment of All Evil (or The Embodiment of Evil); The Progenitor of Hell (or The Progenitor of Hells); Aspect of Evil; The Ultimate Prime Evil; The True Prime Evil
- Alignment: 3rd edition: Lawful evil; 5th edition: Chaotic evil
- Home: Baator
- Power level: Intermediate
- Portfolio: Evil dragons, evil reptiles, conquest, greed
- Domains: Destruction, Dragon, Evil, Greed, Hatred, Law, Scalykind, Trickery, Tyranny

Tiamat is a supremely strong and powerful 5-headed draconic goddess in the Dungeons & Dragons role-playing game. The name is taken from Tiamat, a goddess in ancient Mesopotamian mythology. She is the queen and mother of the evil chromatic dragons and is sometimes a member of the default pantheon of Dungeons & Dragons gods. Her symbol is a five-headed dragon.

== Publication history ==
=== Inspiration ===
Aardy R. DeVarque observed that while the description of Tiamat in the game is significantly different from her mythological counterpart, the fact that she is described as the "evil mother of all dragons [...] is partly why TSR's writers made her a "prismatic" conglomeration of all of the evil chromatic dragons they created".

=== Dungeons & Dragons ===
The character was introduced to the game in its first supplement, Greyhawk (1975), by Gary Gygax and Rob Kuntz. In this book, she was only known as "the Dragon Queen" and "the Chromatic Dragon". She was described, but she did not yet have a personal name.

=== Advanced Dungeons & Dragons ===
The character appears in the first edition Monster Manual (1977). In this book, the Chromatic Dragon was given the personal name, "Tiamat" and is stated to rule "the first plane of the Nine Hells where she spawns all of evil dragonkind". Tiamat, the Chromatic Dragon, Queen of Evil Dragonkind, is further described in Dragon #38 (1980). In the first edition of Deities & Demigods (1980) she is mentioned under the entry for the Babylonian god Marduk ("His battles with Tiamat are legendary."), formally connecting her with the Babylonian Tiamat. Tiamat's role as ruler of Avernus, the first layer of the Nine Hells, is detailed in Ed Greenwood's article, "The Nine Hells Part I", in Dragon #75 (1983). Tiamat's role in the outer planes is detailed in the first edition Manual of the Planes (1987).

In module H4 The Throne of Bloodstone (1988), Bahamut tells the player characters that the Wand of Orcus can only be destroyed if it is "steeped in the black and foul blood from the heart of Tiamat, the Queen of Darkness", although if killed Tiamat and the wand will be removed from the current plane of existence for centuries, but will eventually return to existence.

=== Advanced Dungeons & Dragons 2nd edition ===
Tiamat was detailed as a deity in the book Monster Mythology (1992). Tiamat was later detailed as a deity for the Forgotten Realms campaign setting in the original Draconomicon (1990), further expanded upon for the fictional region of Unther in Powers & Pantheons (1997), and revisted in the Cult of the Dragon (1998) sourcebook. Her role in the cosmology of the Planescape campaign setting was described in On Hallowed Ground (1996). Several draconic children of Tiamat are described in the article "Spawn of Tiamat, Children of Bahamut", in Dragon #260 (June 1999).

=== Dungeons & Dragons 3rd edition ===
Tiamat appears in a preview article for the third edition, in Dragon #272 (June 2000). This information is later included in the Manual of the Planes (2001). She is also referenced in Faiths and Pantheons (2002) from the Forgotten Realms campaign setting. Tiamat is further detailed as a deity in Defenders of the Faith (2000) and Deities and Demigods (2002).

==== Dungeons & Dragons 3.5 ====
Tiamat's priesthood and her role as a draconic deity are further detailed for this edition in Draconomicon: The Book of Dragons (2003), Complete Divine (2004), and Races of the Dragon (2006). Tiamat's role in the Nine Hells is revisited in Fiendish Codex II: Tyrants of the Nine Hells. (2006). The spawn of Tiamat are described in Monster Manual IV (2006) and Monster Manual V (2007).

=== Dungeons & Dragons 4th edition ===
Tiamat appears as one of the deities described in the Dungeon Master's Guide for this edition (2008). She is further detailed and has a stat block in Draconomicon: Chromatic Dragons (2008).

=== Dungeons & Dragons 5th edition ===
Tiamat again appears as one of the deities described in the Dungeon Master's Guide (2014) for this edition. She is the main villain in the first adventure story-line season for the edition as the Cult of the Dragon attempts to bring her from the Nine Hells to Faerûn. Her potential arrival is the conclusion to the adventures Hoard of the Dragon Queen (2014) and Rise of Tiamat (2014). These adventures were updated and rereleased as a single volume, titled Tyranny of Dragons (2019), for the fifth anniversary of 5th edition. Tyranny of Dragons was released in January 2023 with new cover art that features Tiamat.

The dragon focused supplement Fizban's Treasury of Dragons (2021) revisited the origin story of Tiamat and Bahamut and expanded on the First World myth which was introduced in the supplement Tasha's Cauldron of Everything (2020). James Wyatt, the lead designer for Fizban's Treasury of Dragons, stated that the book is a "neat-and-tidy unified theory of dragonkind in myth form" and establishes how versions of the same dragon are linked across the multiverse. Wyatt also commented that they "polished and refined the story of gem dragons' origin to clarify their relationship to Bahamut, Tiamat, and the overall history of dragonkind". The book includes a stat block called the "Aspect of Tiamat" – this iteration is an avatar of the god in Material Plane while Tiamat herself remains in the Nine Hells.

== Campaign settings ==
=== Dragonlance ===
In the Dragonlance campaign setting, Tiamat's equivalent is Takhisis, the Dark Queen. In the neo-pagan press, a series of books published by Oberon Zell-Ravenheart, looks at Takhisis in the Dragonlance world and compares her to the Babylonian and Dungeons & Dragons version of Tiamat. The book is written as a school book for young wizards and witches of the neo-pagan sort. Takhisis is described for her role in the wars of good vs. evil. This ultimate source of the theme of evil is discussed again in a presentation by Dr. Stefan Ekman of Lund University in Sweden. Dr. Ekman compares Takhisis and other fantasy "dark lords", such as Lord Foul and Sauron, to the biblical Satan. In particular he states, "Even though not all of the Dark Lords above signify the ultimate source of evil, Lord Foul, the Dark One, and Takhisis certainly do. And all of them are ultimately actants, characters whose raison d’être is to provide the final threat".

=== Forgotten Realms ===
In the Forgotten Realms campaign setting, Tiamat is one of the few surviving gods of the Untheric pantheon (based on Sumerian and Babylonian mythology), battled Marduk in ages past, and is also a member of the draconic pantheon, daughter of Io, the slayer of Gilgeam the God-king of Unther, "Nemesis of the Gods". In the 4th edition version of the Forgotten Realms, she is the sole survivor of the Untheric pantheon, and now spends most of her time as the goddess of chromatic dragons. Although Enlil, Gilgeam, and Nanna-Sin return for the 5th edition, Tiamat appears to have made no move to engage with them, preferring her draconic role and caring little about Unther.

=== Eberron ===
In the Eberron campaign setting, Tiamat is a bound demon lord from the Age of Demons, when dragons and couatl worked together to bind the children of Khyber beneath the earth. She now sits imprisoned in the Pit of Sorrows on the draconic continent of Argonnessen, birthing evil dragonspawn and corrupting the good dragons who watch over her prison.

== Fictional description ==
Tiamat has been known to manifest as a dark-haired human sorceress. In most Dungeons & Dragons campaign settings, however, Tiamat is the five-headed queen of the evil chromatic dragons. She has one head for each customary color of chromatic dragon (black, blue, green, red, white), and each head has the powers of a member of the respective race of dragonkind. Her body is a blending of various chromatic dragon forms with an appropriately multicolored hide. Her body also has traits in common with a wyvern, including a long tail tipped with a poisonous stinger.

Tiamat was also one of the first deities to have aspects, or lesser avatars. These aspects may appear as powerful versions of her chromatic children or as versions of her own five-headed form. One such multiheaded aspect was released in the Dungeons & Dragons Miniatures expansion set War of the Dragon Queen, with detailed role-playing game statistics in Dragon Magic. A smaller aspect of Tiamat first appeared in the Miniatures Handbook.

=== Relationships ===
Like most other draconic deities, Tiamat is the offspring of the dragon creator deity Io. Tiamat is the eternal rival of her brother Bahamut, the ruler of the good metallic dragons. It is hinted that her overt hatred toward Bahamut has developed, over a vast period of time, into a twisted lust for her brother as well. She dwells in Avernus, the first layer of the Outer Plane of Baator (also known as the Nine Hells). The first edition of Advanced Dungeons & Dragons named her as the ruler of Avernus; later editions reserved the rulership of the layers of Baator for powerful baatezu (devils).

In many campaign settings, the draconic pantheon of gods consists of Io, Aasterinian, Bahamut, Chronepsis, Faluzure, Sardior, and Tiamat.

Three baatezu nobles (granted to her by Bel) serve Tiamat and command her armies on Avernus. Malphas leads 40 companies of abishai, Amduscias leads 29 companies of abishai, and Goap leads three companies of erinyes. With Pearza of the Dark Eight, Tiamat created the first abishai.

Tiamat presently has five consorts, who are great wyrms of each chromatic dragon species. Previous consorts include Apsu, Kingsu, Ephelomon, the red dragon Etiol, and the now-undead dragon Dragotha. Three of Tiamat's children were detailed in Dragon #260. An-Ur, the Wandering Death, wanders the Ethereal Plane, devouring whole demiplanes. It supposedly sprang into being from Tiamat's "first breath", which may have been the name of one of her consorts, though An-Ur resembles no draconic species, except perhaps the ethereal moonstone dragons. Dhakoth the Corruptor was born on the Negative Energy Plane; its father is unknown. Mordukhavar the Reaver is the offspring of Tiamat and Cantrum of the Dark Eight. Kurtulmak is also her son, at least according to some myths.

Periodically Tiamat has battles with the Babylonian god Marduk, who dwells in Arcadia. She also battles Bahamut, her Lawful Good counterpart. Heironeous and Moradin also consider themselves her enemies. Tiamat claims not to need allies, although she has many pacts with Bel and with lawful evil deities such as Hextor.

In 4th Edition, Tiamat is at war with Zehir ever since she first invaded his realm of Tytherion. While the two gods are not openly fighting right now, they are far from allies; the current situation can mainly be regarded as a temporary cease-fire.

=== Realm ===
Tiamat's realm, known as the Dragonspawn Pits of Azharul or simply as Tiamat's lair, sprawls in a cluster of tall hills and mountains near a pillar made from the tormented heads of liars and a pit of maggots from which lemures emerge. One must fly or swim across the maggot pit to reach Tiamat's caves. Tiamat's lair contains the main gate to the second of the Nine Hells, Dis. To reach it, one must pass a chamber known as the Cave of Greed, which is filled with cursed treasure that compels the weak-willed to try to steal it. Tiamat has her own chamber within the complex, as do each of her five consorts, but it is possible to travel to Dis without disturbing her.

In the 4th edition cosmology, Tiamat shares the Astral Dominion of Tytherion, the Endless Night, with Zehir. Zehir was the original ruler, but Tiamat invaded intending to take the entire realm for herself. She successfully drove Zehir and his forces out of the caverns they loved, but she misjudged the strength and determination of the Midnight Serpent. The result is the bizarre allocation of Tytherion today: Tiamat rules the caves of Tytherion far beneath the skies and mountains she prefers, while Zehir rules the mountains above, far above the caverns and trenches his followers prefer. Although both would prefer to exchange their realms, they are too proud to actually do anything about it.

In the Forgotten Realms, Tiamat's realm is still located in the Nine Hells. She later grew in power to claim a realm of her own, but it was later destroyed. After a series of defeats and setbacks and seeing Bahamut rise in power, she pledged her allegiance to Bane and now resides in the Black Hand's realm of Banehold.

=== Cult ===
Tiamat is a greedy, vain, and arrogant goddess who embodies all the strengths of evil dragonkind, and few of their weaknesses. The Queen of Evil Dragons demands reverence, homage, supplication, and tribute from her subjects. She is sometimes called "Her Dark Majesty" or simply "Dark Queen". Tiamat is most concerned with spreading evil, defeating good, and propagating chromatic dragons. She never forgives a slight. Although she is not averse to razing the occasional village, her true schemes are subtle and hard to detect. She has been compared to a puppeteer manipulating her creations from within shadows.

==== Worship ====
Although she claims dominance over all evil dragons (and despite her misleading title, Queen of Chaos), Tiamat's priests, who are known as Wyrmlairds or Wyrmkeepers, are either neutral evil or lawful evil. Tiamat's church has a rigid hierarchy, beginning with the lowly Custodians of the Copper Chalice and continuing with, in ascending rank, the Defenders of the Silver Shield, Wardens of the Electrum Mail, Guardians of the Gold Scepter, Keepers of the Platinum Crown, Scales of the White Wyrm, Horns of the Black Beast, Wings of the Green Gargantua, Talons of the Blue Baatoran, Breaths of the Red Ravager, and the Dark Scaly Ones leading them all. The ceremonial garb of a humanoid priest of Tiamat is a form-fitting suit of scales. Dragons or those whose scales naturally cover their bodies do not require this. Adventuring garb typically includes scale mail, and priests are preoccupied with gathering treasure and undermining other faiths.

Few humans or other humanoids worship Tiamat, but her children, the chromatic dragons, all acknowledge her sovereignty. Blue and green dragons obey her most readily. The grotesque reptilian creatures known as the spawn of Tiamat worship her as their mother. Kobolds may also revere her as their progenitor. Prayers to the Dragon Queen focus on the promise of filling the world with evil dragons and either destroying it or dominating it utterly.

==== Rituals ====
Temples to Tiamat are often built within the lairs of long-dead dragons. They are filled with piles of wealth to be sacrificed to the Chromatic Dragon, as well as traps to keep out heretics and the unfaithful. Few dragons keep shrines to her in their own lairs, because they fear that she might notice their hoards and demand a portion thereof.

The two most important daily ceremonies are the Tithing and the Rite of Respect. The former is an offering of a small amount of treasure to the goddess; the tithe is cupped in the priest's hands or talons, and when a prayer is completed, the valuables have sometimes (10% of the time) simply vanished. The Rite of Respect is performed by non-dragons; it is a complicated ceremony of kow-towing in the presence of a dragon or other spawn of Tiamat. Evil dragons celebrate great victories by torturing prisoners and committing other atrocities in Tiamat's name.

=== Myths and legends ===
==== Vorel ====
Tiamat's enmity with Bahamut dates back to their creation, when Io made them; they were made with the intention of becoming complements and mates, but their personalities were too much at odds. Tiamat murdered Vorel, their elder sibling, and tried to frame Bahamut for the deed. Io realized who was truly to blame and banished Tiamat from his presence.

==== The Violation of Tiamat's Lair ====
In one kobold creation myth, Kurtulmak owes his existence to an assault launched on Tiamat by an army of thieves shortly after she had laid a clutch of eggs. Badly injured and with her lair heavily damaged, she caused one of her eggs to hatch, thus creating Kurtulmak. The newly hatched godling quickly began creating a defensive perimeter of traps and restoring the caverns. During the process, Kurtulmak found an egg of Tiamat's that had fallen away from the nest and, deeming it had been away for too long to ever hatch naturally, used his magic to cause it to hatch, thus producing miniature versions of himself: the first kobolds.

==== The Banishment of Tiamat ====
Many myths claim that Tiamat lived for a long time on the Prime Material Plane, seeding it with evil dragons and dark magic. Eventually she was banished to the Nine Hells by Bahamut and a sky/sun god (perhaps Pelor or Heironeous).

== Reception ==
Tiamat was also named as one of the greatest villains in Dungeons & Dragons history in Dragon #359, the magazine's final print issue. David M. Ewalt of Forbes calls Tiamat "the most fearsome dragon in D&D's history", and chroniclers of the game's art Michael Witwer et al. counted her among the characters who gained iconic status through the history of the game.

Her portrayal is sometimes called out as one that is stereotypical of female characters who are depicted as evil: shallow, lying, scheming, treacherous, envious. Jeffrey Andrew Weinstock, in the book The Ashgate Encyclopedia of Literary and Cinematic Monsters, highlighted the historical origins of Tiamat and on the Dungeons & Dragons depiction wrote "she is presented as the offspring of Io, the dragon creator deity. This greedy, vain, and arrogant goddess is in continuous rivalry with her brother Bahamut, probably a reference to Behemoth".

Tiamat has appeared on two Screen Rant top lists: #5 on "Dungeons & Dragons: The 15 Most Powerful Villains, Ranked" and #4 on "Dungeons & Dragons: 10 Most Powerful Dragons, Ranked". Matthew Guida highlighted that "As the goddess of all evil dragons, Tiamat is pretty much the antithesis to her twin brother Bahamut. [...] The worst part is that even if Tiamat is defeated, she will eventually return to spread chaos across the multiverse" and Scott Baird highlighted that "The tarrasque is currently the most powerful creature in the 5th edition of Dungeons & Dragons, where it is matched only by Tiamat in terms of its combat prowess".

Tiamat was #8 on CBR's 2020 "10 Unique (& Powerful) Villains To Spice Up A High Level Dungeons & Dragons Campaign" list — the article states that "Tiamat has a stat block in D&D in the Tyranny of Dragons. She is not as powerful as some other gods, but she has dominion over dragons and can command them to do her bidding. That alone makes her a threat, but being a powerful dragon and a god only compounds this. [...] She is a solid choice if the party just wants to fight dragons".

On Tiamat's portrayal in Rise of Tiamat (2014), Alex Lucard, for DieHard GameFan, highlighted her stat block in 5th Edition and wrote: "Speaking of awesome. Do you like fighting dragons? [...] You can [...] even do battle with Tiamat herself". Lucard also highlighted her depiction on the cover of the book and wrote: "The glossy hardcover with a beautiful spread of Tiamat across both the front and back is something truly awesome to behold. My wife, who has never played a tabletop RPG in her life [...], recognized the D&D incarnation of Tiamat (as opposed to the Sumerian one) instantly and loved it. [...] There is a lot of power in a good cover". This cover received a gold ENnie Award for Best Cover Art. Michael Long, for Tribality, also highlighted Tiamat's 5th Edition stat block and, on the final battle with Tiamat, wrote: "Not only is Tiamat fighting you but there are lots of dragons, so the party might fail. [...] The DM should prepare for that possibility to have a group of high level characters try to save the world again if Tiamat rises".

The "Aspect of Tiamat" stat block in Fizban's Treasury of Dragons (2021) was highlighted as "absolutely terrifying" by The Gamer. ScreenRant comment that "it's unlikely that players will ever face her, as she's a CR 30 monster with over 1000 hit points". Brenton Stewart, for CBR, viewed the "Aspect of Tiamat" as too hard "for a new DM to run" due to the difficulty of balancing "top-level" encounters. Stewart wrote that "while the Tarrasque may have the same CR rating, Tiamat is a far greater threat requiring the full range of the game's ruleset. Tiamat manifests as a five-headed dragon immune to almost all damage types, cannot roll almost any saving throw at anything less than a 20, and can use Chromatic Wrath to regain 500 hit points if Tiamat is ever beaten. This combines with Mythic Actions [...] all while the Aspect of Tiamat breathes out a variety of its breath attacks that can straightforwardly devastate any defense". Mike Bernier, for the Arcane Eye, commented that the new design approach of simplified stat blocks "hurts the out-of-the-box playability" of monsters with a high CR rating such as the Great Wyrms and the Aspects of Bahamut and Tiamat. Bernier wrote that "I can’t see any circumstances where I would run the CR 30 Aspect of Tiamat over the one already published in Rise of Tiamat".

== In other media ==
- In the 1983–1985 Dungeons & Dragons TV series, Tiamat (voiced by Frank Welker) is a recurring threat to the protagonists, whenever she encounters them. In addition, Tiamat is described as the one being that the evil wizard Venger fears.
- Various monsters called Tiamat, patterned after the Dungeons & Dragons character, have appeared in other fantasy games, particularly role-playing video games.
- In the MMORPG Neverwinter, Tiamat is a main boss in the game's 2014 expansion Rise of Tiamat.
- In the 2011 play She Kills Monsters, the final scene consists of a fight with Tiamat.
- In the adult animated anthology series Secret Level (2024), the episode "The Queen's Cradle" features a group of adventurers who face off against Tiamat after she is summoned. Tiamat is voiced by Tracy Wiles.
- Tiamat is the primary antagonist in the Stern Pinball machine Dungeons & Dragons: The Tyrant's Eye.
