= Dungeons & Dragons Computer Labyrinth Game =

- Publishers: Mattel
- Players: 1–2
- Chance: Medium
- Skills: Strategy

The Dungeons & Dragons Computer Labyrinth Game is an electronic board game released by Mattel in 1980.

== Description ==
The board resembles a plastic castle superstructure with a grid in the middle the size of a chess board. Underneath this is a drawer which holds two metal warrior figures, a dragon, a treasure chest, a number of plastic pieces that are used for walls, and a pair of markers for secret rooms. The castle is computerized, and the playing surface is touch sensitive. Each time the game is started the computer randomly generates an invisible labyrinth containing the treasure and the dragon.

== Gameplay ==
The Dungeons & Dragons Computer Labyrinth Game is an electronic board game, representing a dungeon with a dragon residing in it. The computer randomly places 50 walls throughout the board, and then two players compete to hinder each other as they try to advance, while searching each room for the treasure. If a player encounters the dragon, the player is injured and returns to his or her secret room.

The game can be played with one or two players who take the role of warriors searching for a treasure to take it back to the player's secret room. The player chooses either the basic level or advanced level, and then each player chooses a secret room. The warrior can move up to 8 squares per turn, and the game makes an electronic sound each time a warrior enters a square. If the sound indicates that the warrior walks into a door or wall then movement stops for that turn. The dragon starts the game asleep and when a player is three squares away from the treasure, the game makes a sound to warn players that the dragon has awoken. The game also makes a sound to alert that a player has found the treasure, and to warn that the invisible dragon is flying towards a warrior or attacking. A warrior dies from three attacks by the dragon, and attacks also reduce the movement of the warrior in squares. The dragon moves only one square per turn. In the two player game, the warriors can attack one another, and the computer assigns a variable strength to each warrior.

A player moves their figurine from square to square; depending on what is in the square, an electronic sound is triggered, allowing a player to discover where walls are located. Another sound indicates that the dragon's treasure has been located, and between player turns, the "Dragon" sound indicates that the dragon has moved one square. When the dragon first wakes, it is not possible to know exactly where the dragon is on the board; although one can make a reasonable guess by choosing a square three spaces away in a direction that has not been previously approached. Once the dragon attacks a player, the dragon's position is known for the remainder of the game and can be marked with the included dragon figurine. The algorithm for the dragon's movement is well explained: it moves one space per turn towards a target, going diagonal and over walls if necessary. The dragon's target is the player who has the treasure, or, if no player has the treasure, the closest player. If two players are equally close, the dragon follows the player it was following in the previous move. If both players are hidden in their secret rooms, the dragon moves toward the treasure room.

== Reception ==
Jamie Thompson reviewed the game for White Dwarf, giving the game an overall rating of 4, stating that "the low rating is an assessment of the game for all age groups, but it is more suitable for the very young". Thompson was critical of the game, and quipped: "Not, as you can see, the TSR version but merely a small electronic game of the same name. I wonder how much Mattel paid TSR for using the name". Thompson described the board as "a cheap looking plastic castle" that came with "two cheap metal warrior figures [and] a tinny-looking dragon". Thompson commented that when moving into a space that is not clear, "you might find that your heroic warrior is blundering into yet another invisible wall". Thompson found that players attacking each other in a two player game "providing a bit more interest to the quest" and determined that a single solitaire game will last about 10–15 minutes at most, two player games a little longer. Thompson concluded the review by saying: "All in all it provides some initial light fun - hearing the dragon wake, take to the air and then suddenly find he's upon you and the like - but it soon loses its flavour. I would say not a good buy for the serious or experienced adult gamer, especially when you consider the ridiculous price. I'd never go into a shop and actually buy this (unless I had spare cash to throw around and a kid to buy it for). The game appears to make no reference to any suitable age groups, but, I suspect it is really quite a good game for the under 12s (at least), being simplicity itself to learn. The code sounds soon become familiar and rules are clear and well laid out. Its major drawback is its price."

== Reviews ==
- 1981 Games 100 in Games
- 1982 Games 100 in Games
- Electronic Games
- Jeux & Stratégie #12
- Polyhedron #11

== See also ==
- Dungeons & Dragons Computer Fantasy Game, Mattel's next Dungeons & Dragons game
