= Fizban's Treasury of Dragons =

Dungeons & Dragons fantasy role-playing game source book

- Rules required: Dungeons & Dragons, 5th edition
- First published: October 26, 2021
- Pages: 224
- ISBN: 0786967293

Fizban's Treasury of Dragons is sourcebook that focuses on dragons in the 5th edition of the Dungeons & Dragons fantasy role-playing game and was published October 26, 2021. The book adds a variety of draconic themed options for both players and Dungeon Masters.

== Contents ==
Fizban's Treasury of Dragons is a 224-page sourcebook on dragons in the 5th edition. While the sourcebook is setting neutral, it contains in-character marginalia by the wizard Fizban the Fabulous of the Dragonlance setting. The book expands on game elements for the 5th edition, such as:

- A bestiary focused on draconic creatures, including the addition of Gem dragons
- Draconic themed player character options
  - Two new subclasses: The Way of the Ascendent Dragon Monk and the Drakewarden Ranger
  - New subraces, Gem and Metallic, for the Dragonborn
- Dungeon Master tools

== Publication history ==
While the book was originally scheduled for release on October 19, 2021, delays due to supply chain issues caused by the COVID-19 pandemic meant that the release was delayed to October 26, 2021. Fizban's Treasury of Dragons features cover art by Chris Rahn; an alternate cover will be available only in local game stores with art by Anato Finnstark. This is the first dragon focused supplement for the edition.

Ray Winninger, D&D’s executive producer, stated at a press event that "this is not that same old dragon book that's been published for D&D in the past" and that this sourcebook "explains why dragons appear in the name of the game, what makes them more important than other monsters in D&D cosmology". Polygon highlighted that Fizban's Treasury of Dragons "includes gem dragons — amethyst, crystal, emerald, sapphire, and topaz — which have been absent from official D&D books for nearly 20 years".

The book is also available as a digital product through the following Wizards of the Coast licensees: D&D Beyond, Fantasy Grounds, and Roll20.

== Related products ==
=== Unearthed Arcana ===
Parts of Fizban's Treasury of Dragons were developed through Unearthed Arcana, a public playtest series. In October 2020, 2020: Subclasses, Part 5 featured two new draconic themed subclasses and then in April 2021, 2021: Draconic Options featured new variant Dragonborn subraces and an alternate player version of the Kobold race along with new draconic themed feats and spells. The Kobold alternative is different from the version released in Volo's Guide to Monsters (2016) which contained stat penalties for playable monster races; playable race stat penalties have since been removed from the game. The variant Dragonborn subraces add a delineation between Chromatic and Metallic Dragonborn unlike the version released in the Player's Handbook (2014); it also adds a Gem Dragonborn subrace.

== Reception ==
In Publishers Weekly's "Best-selling Books Week Ending November 5, 2021", Fizban's Treasury of Dragons was #3 in "Hardcover Nonfiction" and sold 36,164 units; the following week it slipped to #24 with 7,800 units sold.

Corey Plante, for Inverse, highlighted that the book adds a "larger unified theory of dragonkind" to the lore of the multiverse and delivers "the deepest dive into their origins that the game has ever seen". Plante wrote, "regardless of your party's level, there's plenty to look forward to in Fizban's hoard of knowledge to help inspire your next encounter, adventure, or whole campaign — even if it's an evil dragon killing its own echoes across the multiverse with the ultimate aim of dominating all of existence on the Material Plane".

Charlie Hall, for Polygon, called Fizban's Treasury of Dragons an "oddity" compared to other Dungeons & Dragons sourcebooks and that the content skews more towards a Dungeon Master than a player. Hall wrote that there are two primary uses of the book – the first is to help Dungeon Masters create a "personalized, high-level dragon villain (or ally) for those powerful characters to contend with" after they finish most campaign books (which end at around level 10) and that "canny DMs should be able to generate another five or more levels of gameplay after just a few hours' work". The second is to help Dungeon Masters craft "an entire adventure of their own creation" from scratch. Hall highlighted that the Draconomicon is "not a traditional bestiary" and instead acts as "a kind of miniature Player's Handbook built for DMs". Hall commented that this sourcebook "isn't a book that every fan of D&D needs to own. Instead, it's a book that skilled DMs can use to level up their existing games, or to create a thrilling new world of their own".

Christian Hoffer, for ComicBook.com, called the book a "spiritual sequel to the Dracomonicon". Hoffer highlighted that "after the opening 30 pages, the rest of Fizban's Treasury of Dragons is meant primarily for the DM. [...] Fizban's Treasury of Dragons feels much more focused than past D&D bestiary-style books. While Volo's Guide to Monsters and Mordenkainen's Tome of Foes touched on just about every corner of the D&D multiverse, Fizban's Treasury of Dragons felt much more like an 'old school' D&D supplement that expanded upon one aspect of the game. More importantly, Fizban's Treasury of Dragons tries to address some of the game's current glaring weaknesses. [...] There are a couple of notable weaknesses in Fizban's Treasury of Dragons. [...] Overall, Fizban's Treasury of Dragons is probably the strongest D&D release in recent memory".
