= Something Wild (module) =

Dungeons & Dragons adventure module

- Rules required: Advanced Dungeons & Dragons 2nd edition
- Character levels: 4 - 7
- Campaign setting: Planescape
- Authors: Ray Vallese
- First published: 1996

Something Wild is an adventure module for the 2nd edition of the Advanced Dungeons & Dragons fantasy role-playing game, published in 1996.

== Plot summary ==
Something Wild is an adventure in which the player characters become involved in a conflict with a god who has escaped from his prison into a collective nightmare, causing maddening dreams and fighting in the streets which threatens to destroy the city of Sigil.

== Publication history ==
Something Wild was designed by Ray Vallese, and published by TSR in 1996. The cover artist was Robh Ruppel, the interior two-color artist was DiTerlizzi, the color plates were by Jeff Miracola, Alan Pollack, and Adam Rex, and the conceptual artist was Dana Knutson.

== Reception ==
Trenton Webb reviewed Something Wild for Arcane magazine, rating it a 6 out of 10 overall. He calls the adventure a "wild and tricky bash", but notes that it "coughs up enough connected and comprehensible clues to keep the players on track yet maintains the overall mystery". He also calls it "a fresh but complex scenario that makes vast demands on both referees and players", noting that it draws on some of the newer plans and drops big hints about the next phase of the Blood War. According to Webb, the Planescape Campaign Setting boxed set is all that's required to run the adventure, but he also recommends using Planes of Conflict, the first Planescape Monstrous Compendium Appendix, In the Cage: A Guide to Sigil, The Factol's Manifesto, and Ravenloft: The Nightmare Lands. He considers the rules and references "beautifully intertwined", with the non-linear encounters "elegantly limited" to keep the players from getting ahead of themselves and ruining the scenario. Webb concludes the review by stating, "Something Wild bristles impressively with ambition, subtly and guile. Yet while it makes an entertaining read, playing the scenario can be too taxing to be fun."
