= Adam Rex =

American children's illustrator and writer (born 1973)

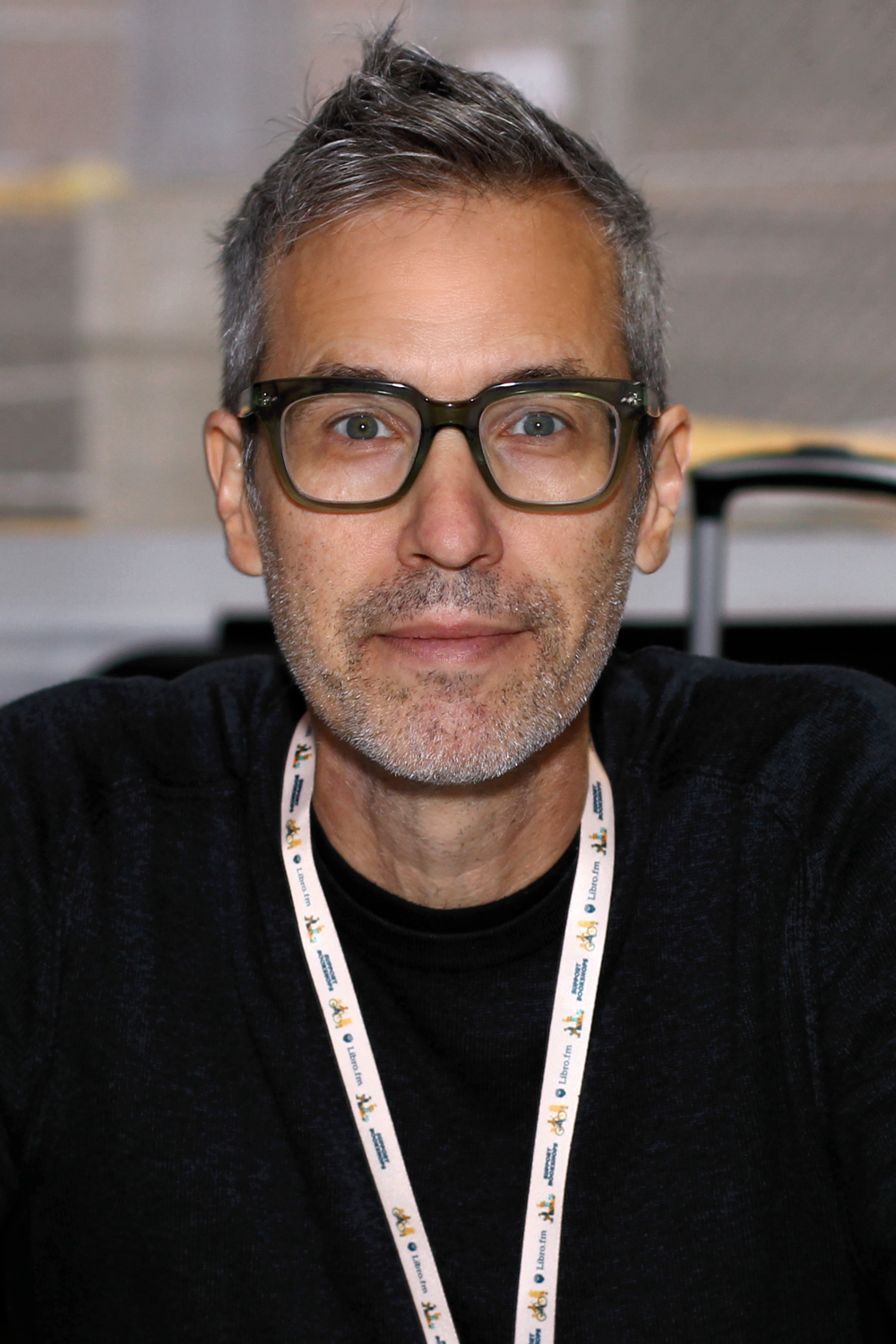
- Rex at the 2023 Texas Book Festival
- Born: Adam Michael Rex; May 16, 1973 (age 52) United States
- Occupation: Author, illustrator
- Genre: Role-playing games, children's books
- Children: 1

Website
- adamrex.com

Adam Michael Rex (born May 16, 1973) is an American illustrator and author of children's books from Tucson, Arizona.

== Career ==
Adam Rex received a Bachelor of Fine Arts from the University of Arizona. He has contributed illustrations to Magic: The Gathering and other fantasy art and has illustrated several children's books. Adam has noted that his history with fantasy drawings initially hurt his entry into children's books. His first books, Tree-Ring Circus and Frankenstein Makes a Sandwich, were published in 2006. Frankenstein Makes a Sandwich went on to become a New York Times best seller.

His first foray into illustration of children's books, 2003's The Dirty Cowboy, written by Amy Timberlake, received positive reviews, including from The Capital Times, which described Rex's work as "gorgeous... This is his first book, but you wouldn't know it from looking. His artwork has real resonance." The Santa Fe New Mexican wrote, "The consummate skill of Rex's illustrations combines with wit and knowledge of the physical and emotional terrain." The book, which is about a cowboy taking a bath, was banned at W.C. Andrews Elementary School in Texas in 2006, and by the Annville-Cleona School District in Pennsylvania in 2012. The ACLU report on the Texas incident noted that the "Principal did not want this book in the library."

His illustrations of the book The Case of the Case of Mistaken Identity, written by Mac Barnett, were reviewed favorably by The Gazette's critic, noting "a lively set of endpapers."

DreamWorks Animation adapted The True Meaning of Smekday into the animated feature film Home (2015), starring Rihanna and Jim Parsons.

Adam Rex cites Douglas Adams (author of The Hitchhiker's Guide to the Galaxy) as his biggest influence as a writer.

== Bibliography ==
=== Novels ===
- The True Meaning of Smekday (Hyperion Books, Oct 2, 2007), illustrated
- Fat Vampire: A Never Coming of Age Story (Balzer + Bray/HarperCollins, Jul 27, 2010) – "secondary (senior high) school" material OCLC 457152370
- Cold Cereal Saga (published by Balzer + Bray)
1. Cold Cereal (Feb 7, 2012)
2. Unlucky Charms (Feb 5, 2013)
3. Champions of Breakfast (Feb 11, 2014)
- Smek for President (Hyperion, Feb 10, 2015) OCLC 876833401 – sequel to The True Meaning of Smekday
- School's First Day of School (with Christian Robinson)

=== As illustrator only ===
- The Dirty Cowboy, written by Amy Timberlake (Farrar, Straus and Giroux, Aug 8, 2003)
- Lucy Rose: Here's the Thing About Me, Katy Kelly (Delacorte Books for Young Readers, Sep 14, 2004) – Lucy Rose novels by Katy Kelly, books 1–3; book 4 (2007) illus. by Peter Ferguson OCLC 74963738
- Ste-e-e-e-eamboat a-Comin'!, Jill Esbaum (Farrar, Straus and Giroux, Mar 24, 2005)
- Lucy Rose: Big on Plans, Katy Kelly (Delacorte, Jun 14, 2005)
- Lucy Rose: Busy Like You Can't Believe, Katy Kelly (Delacorte, Sep 12, 2006)
- Small Beauties: The Journey of Darcy Heart O'Hara, Elvira Woodruff (Knopf Books for Young Readers, Sep 12, 2006)
- Billy Twitters and His Blue Whale Problem, Mac Barnett (Hyperion, Jun 23, 2009)
- Guess Again!, Mac Barnett (Simon & Schuster Children's Publishing, Sep 15, 2009)
- Brixton Brothers novels by Mac Barnett, published by Simon & Schuster Children's – books 1–3; book 4 (2012) illus. by Matthew Myers OCLC 827714401
1. The Case of the Case of Mistaken Identity (Oct 6, 2009)
2. The Ghostwriter Secret (Oct 5, 2010)
3. It Happened on a Train (Oct 4, 2011)
- Manners Mash-up: a goofy guide to good behavior, collaboration by Tedd Arnold, et al. (Dial Press, 2011) – "Each page is illustrated by a different artist." OCLC 535490588
- Chloe and the Lion, Mac Barnett (Hyperion, 2012)
- Chu's Day, Neil Gaiman (HarperCollins, Jan 8, 2013)
- How This Book Was Made, Mac Barnett (Little, Brown Books for Young Readers, Sept 6, 2016)

=== As writer and illustrator ===
- Tree-Ring Circus (Harcourt Children's Books, Jun 1, 2006)
- Frankenstein Makes a Sandwich (Harcourt, Sep 1, 2006), poetry
- Pssst! (Harcourt, Sep 1, 2007)
- Frankenstein Takes the Cake (Harcourt, Sep 1, 2008), poetry
- Star Wars: Are You Scared, Darth Vader? (Disney-Lucasfilm Press, 2018)
- On Account of the Gum (Chronicle Books, October 6, 2020)

=== Role-playing games ===
Changeling: The Dreaming (White Wolf)

- The Autumn People (1995) Interior Artist
- Immortal Eyes: Shadows on the Hill (1996) Interior Artist
- Immortal Eyes: Court of All Kings (1996) Interior Artist
- Changeling Players Guide (1996) Interior Artist
- Kithbook: Nockers (1997) Interior Artist
- Isle of the Mighty (1997) Cover Artist
- Changeling: The Dreaming, 2nd Ed. (1997) Interior Artist
- Kingdom of Willows (1998) Cover Artist

Planescape (TSR)

- Something Wild (1996) Interior Artist
- On Hallowed Ground (1996) Interior Artist
- Hellbound: The Blood War (1996) Interior Artist
- Doors to the Unknown (1996) Interior Artist
- A Guide to the Astral Plane (1996) Interior Artist
- The Great Modron March (1997) Interior Artist
- Faces of Evil: The Fiends (1997) Interior Artist
- Dead Gods (1997) Interior Artist
- Monstrous Compendium Planescape Appendix III (1998) Interior Artist
- The Inner Planes (1998) Interior Artist
- Faction War (1998) Interior Artist
- A Guide to the Ethereal Plane (1998) Interior Artist

Dungeons & Dragons, 3rd edition (Wizards of the Coast)

- Monster Manual (2000) Interior Artist
- Monsters of Faerûn (Forgotten Realms) (2001) Interior Artist
- Lords of Darkness (Forgotten Realms) (2001) Interior Artist
- Silver Marches (Forgotten Realms) (2002) Interior Artist
- Unapproachable East (Forgotten Realms) (2003) Interior Artist
- Races of Faerûn (Forgotten Realms) (2003) Interior Artist
- Races of Stone (2004) Cover Artist
- Monster Manual III (2004) Interior Artist
- Races of the Wild (2005) Cover Artist

Other

- A Medieval Tapestry: Personalities of Mythic Europe (Ars Magica) (1997) Atlas Games, Cover Artist
- Guide to the Sabbat (Vampire: The Masquerade) (1999) White Wolf, Interior Artist
- Guide to the Camarilla (Vampire: The Masquerade) (1999) White Wolf, Interior Artist
- Dark•Matter Campaign Setting (1999) Wizards of the Coast, Interior Artist
- Wheel of Time Roleplaying Game (2001) Wizards of the Coast, Interior Artist
- Prophecies of the Dragon (Wheel of Time) (2002) Wizards of the Coast, Interior Artist
- Call of Cthulhu Roleplaying Game (Call of Cthulhu d20) (2002) Wizards of the Coast, Interior Artist

== Awards ==
- Winner, 2017 National Cartoonists Society Division Award for Book Illustration
