= Planescape =

Dungeons & Dragons fictional campaign setting

- Designers: David "Zeb" Cook
- Publishers: TSR, Inc. Wizards of the Coast
- Publication: 1994
- Genres: Fantasy
- Systems: Dungeons & Dragons

Planescape is a campaign setting for the Dungeons & Dragons fantasy role-playing game, designed by Zeb Cook, and published by TSR in 1994.

== Description ==
Planescape encompasses numerous planes of existence, creating an entire cosmology called the Great Wheel, which was originally developed in the 1987 Manual of the Planes by Jeff Grubb, derived from concepts laid out in the 1978 Player's Handbook by Gary Gygax. This includes many of the other Dungeons & Dragons worlds, linking them via inter-dimensional magical portals.

=== Cosmology ===
An artistic representation of the grand design of the Planes.

The Dungeons & Dragons cosmology as reflected in Planescape consists of a number of planes, which can be divided into the following regions:

- The Inner Planes (representing planes of elemental nature, such as Water, Earth, Fire, and Air, as well as the Positive and Negative energy planes)
- The Ethereal Plane
- The Prime Material Plane
- The Astral Plane
- The Outer Planes (representing alignments and the primary domains of the various deities, where their petitioners spend their afterlives)

Planescape "solidified the Great Wheel cosmology that began in 1e and would later be reinstated in 5e as the dominant of three theoretical models".

==== Outer Planes ====
The Outer Planes consist of: the Abyss, Acheron, Arborea, Arcadia, Baator, Beastlands, Bytopia, Carceri, Elysium, Gehenna, Gray Waste of Hades, Limbo, Mechanus, Mount Celestia, the Outlands, Pandemonium, and Ysgard.

=== Sigil ===
Sigil, the "City of Doors", is located atop the Spire in the Outlands. It has the shape of a torus, and the city itself is located on the inner surface of the ring. There is no sky, simply an all-pervasive light that waxes and wanes to create day and night. Sigil cannot be entered or exited save via portals. Although this makes it quite safe from any would-be invader, it also makes it a prison of sorts for those not possessing a portal key. Thus, many call Sigil "The Bird Cage" or "The Cage". Though Sigil is commonly held to be located "at the center of the planes" (where it is positioned atop the infinitely tall Spire), some argue that this is impossible since the planes are infinite in all dimensions, and therefore there can never truly be a center to any or all of them. From the Outlands, Sigil can be seen suspended above the supposedly infinite Spire.

=== Factions ===
Within Sigil there are philosophy-derived factions. Before the event known as the Faction War, the groups controlled the political climate of Sigil. Each of these factions is based on one particular belief system; one faction's beliefs make them enemies while others make them allies. There are fifteen factions in total.

==== The Faction War ====
In 1998, TSR published Faction War, an adventure that effectively closed the book on Planescape, as it was then ending the product line. The culmination of several adventures leading up to that point, the Faction War brought an end to the factions' control of the city. Instigated by the power-hungry Duke Rowan Darkwood, factol of the Fated, in a bid to dethrone the Lady and rule Sigil himself, the war spread throughout the city before the Lady of Pain, with the aid of a group of adventurers (the players' characters), intervened.

=== Sects ===
Sects are in many ways identical to the Factions, differing in that they are not based in Sigil. Sects are often highly specific to the particular planes they originate from, though historically many of the Factions were once Sects and some Sects were once Factions.

=== Rules ===
There are three principles (or heuristics) governing the world of Planescape: the Rule-of-Three, the Unity of Rings, and the Center of the Multiverse.

==== Rule-of-Three ====
The first principle, the Rule-of-Three, says simply that things tend to happen in threes. The principles which govern the planes are themselves subject to this rule.

==== Unity of Rings ====
The second principle is the Unity of Rings, and notes that many things on the planes are circular, coming back around to where they started.

==== Center of All ====
The third principle (fitting neatly into the Rule-of-Three above) is the Center of All, and states that there is a center of everything—or, rather, wherever a person happens to be is the center of the multiverse... From their own perspective, at least. As most planes are functionally infinite, disproving anyone's centricity would be impossible. In Planescape, this is meant philosophically just as much as it is meant in terms of multiversal geography.

The fact that anywhere could be the center of the multiverse in this view also implies that nowhere can be said to be the only absolute true center. This sparks a lot of arguments and violence since some people believe the City of Doors to be the center due to its uncommon number of portals to other planes and position in the Outlands and some factions also claim different centers, each with their own significance.

== Publication history ==
=== Development ===
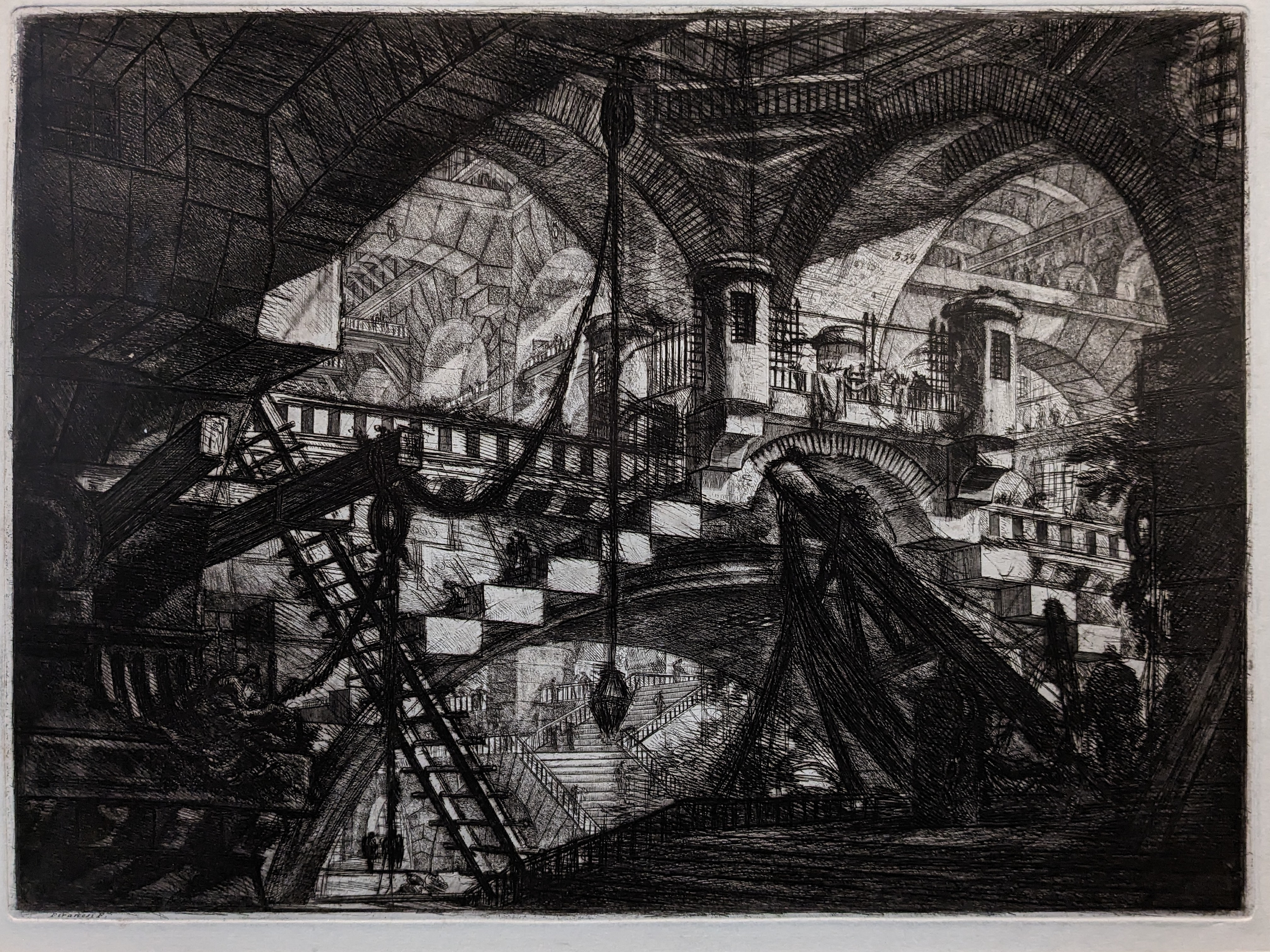
Le Carceri d'Invenzione, Piranesi, 1761. One of a series of etchings that inspired the visual look of the setting.

Planescape is an expansion of ideas presented in the Advanced Dungeons & Dragons Dungeon Master's Guide (First Edition) and the original Manual of the Planes. When Advanced Dungeons & Dragons 2nd edition was published, a decision was made not to include angelic or demonic creatures, and so the cosmology was largely ignored. However, fan demand for a 2nd Edition Manual of the Planes was strong enough to justify its expansion into a full-fledged campaign setting, and so in 1994 Planescape was released.

David "Zeb" Cook developed Planescape when he was assigned to create "a complete campaign world (not just a place to visit), survivable by low-level characters, as compatible with the old Manual of the Planes as possible, filled with a feeling of vastness without overwhelming the referee, distinct from all other TSR campaigns, free of the words 'demon' and 'devil' and explainable to Marketing in 25 words or less". For inspiration, Cook listened to Pere Ubu, Philip Glass and Alexander Nevsky, read The Dictionary of the Khazars, Einstein's Dreams, and The Narrow Road to the Deep North, and for fun at "Bad Movie Nights", watched such films as Naked Lunch and Wolf Devil Woman.

Cook came up with the idea that all of the activity in Sigil would revolve around factions, each of which would be built upon ideas taken to their extreme. He also felt that Sigil was necessary as a crossroads for the planes and a campaign center which could be both an adventure location itself and somewhere to hide out, which characters could quickly get to and from. Cook decided to adapt the Manual of the Planes because the older material made survival on the planes too difficult or complex, so he ignored anything that made gameplay more complicated, which left the "descriptions of twisted and strange creations".

Cook conceived of the look for the setting from images such as "the gloomy prisons of Piranesi's Le Carceri etchings, and Brian Froud's illustrations and surrealist art", and Dana Knutson was assigned to draw whatever Cook wanted to see. According to Cook, "before any of us knew it, [Knutson] drew the Lady of Pain. I'm very fond of the Lady of Pain; she really locks up the Planescape look. We all liked her so much that she became our logo".

=== 2nd edition ===
The Planescape Campaign Setting was released, for AD&D 2nd Edition, in April 1994. The campaign setting was followed by a series of expansions detailing the Planes of Chaos (by Wolfgang Baur and Lester W. Smith), the Planes of Law (by Colin McComb and Baur), and the Planes of Conflict (by McComb and Dale Donovan). From 1994 to 1998, "Planescape was a major setting" for Dungeons & Dragons.

The setting also had a small number of novels.

=== Later editions ===
Upon the release of 3rd Edition, Planescape, along with most other settings, were discontinued, although fan sites such as planewalker.com were allowed to continue to use the material and update it to the new edition. The 3rd Edition Manual of the Planes (2001), the 3.5 Edition Dungeon Master's Guide (2003), and the Planar Handbook (2004) also used the general layout of the planes and some of the details from the setting, including Sigil, but these are not part of the Planescape line.

Sigil is described in the 4th edition Manual of the Planes (2008) and expanded upon in Dungeon Master's Guide 2 (2009). Shannon Appelcline, author of Designers & Dragons, commented that while Sigil "had been largely ignored during the 3e era", it "was faring better in 4e, despite the large-scale restructuring of D&D's cosmology" due to small inclusions in the Dungeon Master's Guide (2008) and Manual of the Planes.

Appelcline highlighted that it was the 4th Edition Dungeon Master's Guide 2 which "saw the return of the fan-favorite setting of Sigil" which "was laid out as a full paragon-level setting. There's not much new here for old-time fans of Planescape, but there was one big change as a result of Faction War (1998). The factions that caused much of the conflict in Planescape are now gone. [...] The Dungeon Master's Guide 2 also contains 'A Conspiracy of Doors', the first Sigil adventure to see print in many years".

The 5th Edition Player's Handbook (2014) also contains a section explaining the planes and briefly mentions Sigil. There is also some information on Sigil in the 5th Edition Dungeon Master's Guide (2014). In July 2022, Unearthed Arcana: Wonders of the Multiverse was released as part of the Unearthed Arcana public playtest series for the 5th Edition. Both Polygon and ComicBook.com highlighted that the new character race – the Glitchling – and other references to the Planescape setting might indicate a reboot of the setting for 5th Edition. Charlie Hall, for Polygon, commented that "this wouldn't be the first time that Wizards used playtest materials to tease a reboot of a classic setting".

Christian Hoffer, for ComicBook.com, wrote that "while described as a collection of material from around the Multiverse, many Dungeons & Dragons fans noticed that it contained multiple references to Mechanus, Sigil, the Outlands, and other areas explored in the popular Planescape setting. [...] Based on the last handful of public playtests, it appears that Dungeons & Dragons is gearing up for some sort of multiversal book in the near future. Whether this is a true Planescape re-launch or just a book that uses the D&D cosmology remains to be seen".

A three-volume box set titled Planescape: Adventures in the Multiverse was released in October 2023 for 5th Edition.

== Reception ==
Pyramid magazine reviewer Scott Haring said Planescape is "the finest game world ever produced for Advanced Dungeons & Dragons". Haring described the writing as "wonderful", also saying that it "has got one of the most distinctive graphic looks I've seen in any game product" and that the "unusual drawings remind [him] a little of Dr. Seuss".

Trenton Webb of British RPG magazine Arcane called Planescape "the premier AD&D world", noting its hallmark as "a bizarre juxtaposition of legend and nightmare". Game designer Rick Swan said that the original Manual of the Planes had in a sense been "reincarnated as the Planescape setting ... TSR's most ambitious campaign world to date. Abandoning the straightforward but dry approach of the Manual, the Planescape set reads less like a textbook and more like a story. Characters take precedence over game systems, high adventure supplants the physics lessons".

Curtis D. Carbonell, in the book Dread Trident: Tabletop Role-Playing Games and the Modern Fantastic, wrote: "Planescape's sophistication marked it as D&D's answer to its own simplistic medieval-European-inspired fantasy settings, [...]. Planescape channeled the Weird before China Miéville brought the 'new weird' genre into focus [...]. With Planescape, we have an attempt by an AD&D game setting to add layers of intellectual complexity to a game often driven by much more simplistic mechanism. The greatest commerce isn't loot, treasure, magic items, etc.; it is belief so strong it can shape reality".

In a review of The Great Modron March, Backstab magazine contributor Philippe Tessier called the presentation of Planescape products superb in general.

In his 2023 book Monsters, Aliens, and Holes in the Ground, RPG historian Stu Horvath noted, "If there is a problem with Planescape, it would be its vast strangeness. There's a lot to explain and not nearly enough space to fit it all in." However, Horvath lauded the artwork, saying, "The art picks up where the words leave off. Planescape is the apex of the aesthetic-driven, high-concept Dungeons & Dragons setting. Dana Knutson developed all of the concept artwork for the setting, which Robh Ruppel turned into covers, and Tony DiTerlizzi used to fill out the interiors." Horvath concluded, "Planescape often feels built for something besides conflict — the art, the philosophy, and the infinite reaches encourage exploration in a way few other D&D settings do: Characters are encouraged to just walk off into the multiverse until they find something to wonder at."

== Awards ==
The Planescape Campaign Setting boxed set won the 1994 Origins Award for Best Graphic Presentation of a Roleplaying Game, Adventure, or Supplement.

== Official products ==
=== Boxed sets ===
- 2600 Planescape Campaign Setting
- 2603 Planes of Chaos
- 2607 Planes of Law
- 2610 A Player's Primer to the Outlands
- 2615 Planes of Conflict
- 2621 Hellbound: The Blood War

=== Miniatures ===
- 10–519 "Planescape Miniatures" – box includes ten miniatures (Duke Rowan, Factol Hashkar, Factol Sarin, Factol Pentar, Lord Graz'zt, Lady of Pain, Erin Montgomery, Lord Pazrael, Factol Rhys, and Karris the Indep) and a Lady of Pain badge (made from the same metal material as the miniatures, but with a pin and backing like a "tie tac" so it can be worn as a "badge").
- 10–520 Planescape Miniatures "Powers of Chaos" – box includes eight miniatures (Baphomet, Bast, Corellon Larethian, Gorellik, Lolth, Loki, Ygorl, and Faerie Queen of Air and Darkness).
- 10–521 Planescape Miniatures "Powers of Law" – box includes eight miniatures (Clangeddin Silverbeard, Hecate, Set, Tyr, Maglubiyet, Horus, Gruumsch, and Moradin).
- 10–522 Planescape Miniatures "Powers of Conflict" – box includes eight miniatures (Cronus the Titan, Garl Glittergold, Tefnut, Hades, Cat Lord, Hel, Skerrit, and Arawn).

=== Accessories ===
- Planescape Conspectus
- 2609 In the Cage: A Guide to Sigil
- 2611 The Factol's Manifesto
- 2620 The Planewalker's Handbook
- 2623 On Hallowed Ground
- 2624 Uncaged: Faces of Sigil
- 2625 A Guide to the Astral Plane
- 2630 Faces of Evil: The Fiends
- 2633 A Guide to the Ethereal Plane
- 2634 The Inner Planes
- 2602 Planescape Monstrous Compendium Appendix
- 2613 Planescape Monstrous Compendium Appendix II
- 2635 Planescape Monstrous Compendium Appendix III
- The Planescape Sketchbook

=== Adventures ===
- 2601 The Eternal Boundary
- 2604 Well of Worlds
- 2605 In the Abyss
- 2606 The Deva Spark
- 2608 Fires of Dis
- 2614 Harbinger House
- 2619 Something Wild
- 2626 Doors to the Unknown
- 2628 The Great Modron March
- 2629 Faction War
- 2631 Dead Gods
- 2632 Tales from the Infinite Staircase

=== Video game ===
The setting was featured in the computer game Planescape: Torment, which portrayed the Planescape world (specifically Sigil, the Outlands, Baator, Carceri, and the Negative Energy Plane). The game is commonly cited to as one of the greatest video games of all time and is considered a cult classic. Due to financial difficulties with the game's original publisher Interplay, the game went out of print. In 2009 the game was re-released. It was released as a download on GOG.com in 2010 and soon became the "second most wanted game" on the site. An enhanced edition by Beamdog was released on April 11, 2017.

Marketed as a spiritual successor to Planescape: Torment, Torment: Tides of Numenera was released in February 2017. The game takes inspiration from the previous game but is not itself based in the Planescape setting.

=== Collectible card game ===
TSR published a collectible card game based on the Planescape setting called Blood Wars. The game featured major locations, personalities, and features of the Planescape setting and also introduced new creatures that were added to the role playing game setting as part of subsequent products.

=== Novels ===
- Fire and Dust (1996), by James Alan Gardner, a rejected title that the author has since published as a free online manuscript.
- Pages of Pain (December 1997), by Troy Denning, (ISBN 0-7869-0508-5)
- Torment (October 1999), by Ray Vallese and Valerie Vallese, (ISBN 0-7869-1527-7)
  Torment is based on an early script of Planescape: Torment.

==== Blood Wars Trilogy ====
- Blood Hostages (January 1996), by J. Robert King, (ISBN 0-7869-0473-9)
- Abyssal Warriors (June 1996), by J. Robert King, (ISBN 0-7869-0501-8)
- Planar Powers (August 1997), by J. Robert King, (ISBN 0-7869-0532-8)
  - Planar Powers won the Origins Awards for Best Game-Related Novel of 1997.

== See also ==
- Multiverse
