= Something Wild =

Something Wild may refer to:

== Film and television ==
- Something Wild (1961 film), an American neo-noir film starring Carroll Baker and Ralph Meeker
- Something Wild (1986 film), an American comedy-thriller starring Jeff Daniels, Melanie Griffith, and Ray Liotta
- "Something Wild" (Dawson's Creek), a 2002 TV episode

== Music ==
- Something Wild (album), by Children of Bodom, 1997
- Something Wild, an album by Radiator Hospital, 2013
- "Something Wild" (song), by Lindsey Stirling, 2016
- "Something Wild", a song written by John Hiatt and first recorded by Iggy Pop from Brick by Brick, 1990
  - Hiatt's version from Perfectly Good Guitar, 1993

== Other uses ==
- Something Wild (module), an adventure module for the Planescape setting of Advanced Dungeons & Dragons
- Something Wild, an Australian native foods business co-founded and part-owned by Daniel Motlop

== See also ==
- Something Wilder, a 1994–1995 American TV sitcom
