= Tiefling =

Fictional humanoid race in Dungeons & Dragons

- Tiefling fighter designed by William O'Connor for 4th Edition Dungeons & Dragons
- First appearance: Planescape Campaign Setting (1994)
- Last appearance: Player's Handbook; (2024)

In-universe information
- Type: Humanoid (planetouched)
- Alignment: Any

The tiefling (/ˈtiːflɪŋ/ TEEF-ling) is a fictional humanoid race in the Dungeons & Dragons (D&D) fantasy roleplaying game. The race was originally introduced in Planescape (1994), a campaign setting in the second edition of Advanced Dungeons & Dragons, as a player character race for the setting. Tieflings became one of the primary races available for player characters in the fourth edition of the game.

In the Planescape setting, they were described as being a mixture of human and "something else" with the implication that the medium-sized non-human ancestors originated from the evil "lower planes". In further supplements, it was clarified that tieflings were usually descended from fiends but not in the same manner as half-fiends, since a tiefling's fiendish ancestry lies further up the family tree. This description remained true in 3rd Edition. In 4th Edition, tieflings are a race whose human ancestors made a bargain with devils to increase their power. Their origin is similar in 5th Edition.

== Name ==
The name, pronounced /ˈtiːflɪŋ/, was derived by Wolfgang Baur from the German word tief meaning "deep, low", and the suffix -ling, "offspring", alluding to their origins in the "lower planes" (in the 2nd and 3rd editions).

== Publication history ==
One of the first artists to depict the tiefling was Tony DiTerlizzi.

=== Advanced Dungeons & Dragons 2nd edition ===
The tiefling was introduced in the Planescape Campaign Setting (1994) with more information in the first Planescape Monstrous Compendium Appendix (1994) and The Planewalker's Handbook (1996). Cameron Lucas, for Game Rant, explained that the race was "originally conceived as a term representative of 'Planetouched' people that have been affected or 'blessed' by a godly being or demon somehow". Lucas commented that the original tieflings had "hybrid features that varied from hooves to reptilian tails" and while their visual appearance changed in subsequent editions, their status "as a socially maligned people" increased in subsequent editions.

=== Dungeons & Dragons 3rd edition ===
The tiefling appears in the Monster Manual for this edition (2000) under the "planetouched" entry.

The fey'ri and tanna'ruk tieflings appeared in Monsters of Faerun (2001). The tiefling is presented as a player character race for the Forgotten Realms setting in the Forgotten Realms Campaign Setting (2001), and the tiefling and fey'ri appear as player character races in Races of Faerûn (2003).

=== Dungeons & Dragons 3.5 edition ===
The tiefling appears in the revised Monster Manual for this edition (2003) under the planetouched entry.

The tiefling paragon was introduced in Unearthed Arcana (2004). The tiefling then appears as a player character race in the Planar Handbook (2004), and Races of Destiny (2004).

=== Dungeons & Dragons 4th edition ===
The tiefling appears as a player character race in the Player's Handbook for the 4th edition (2008), and again in Heroes of the Forgotten Kingdoms (2010). Tieflings also have a racial book dedicated to them in this edition, Player's Handbook Races: Tieflings (2010), as well as the adventure locale book Vor Rukoth: An Ancient Ruins Adventure Site (2010).

William O'Connor, the artist responsible for designing tieflings in this edition, commented that there were few artistic depictions of the race in previous editions. However, with the tiefling becoming a core player race, the 4th edition design team "wanted to radically update their appearance to make them look more intimidating and 'cool'. [...] The horns and the tail were the defining elements of the race so my first direction was to make them as prominent as possible. Part of the design of the 4th edition was to integrate the design into being a miniature game so part of the process was to make the character's silhouettes easily recognizable from a distance". O'Connor highlighted a conversation he had with the creative director Stacy Longstreet who described tieflings as a "cursed people" which helped him figure out "their cultural aesthetic". O'Connor stated that:

My immediate touchstone was of course vampires, and I worked to give the tielfing that sexy, dark and gothic appeal despite their "deformity". I carried this idea over into everything about them, their clothes and equipment. I wanted everything to have a twisted aesthetic as if all of their prized heirlooms and weapons, all the relics of a lost past, were also cursed and contorted into horrible but beautiful shapes, imagining that the forms of the weapons should reflect the shapes of their tails. Elegant and deadly like the tielfing themselves.

=== Dungeons & Dragons 5th edition ===
The tiefling appears as a player character race in the Player's Handbook for the 5th edition (2014). Variant tiefling options appear in the Sword Coast Adventure Guide (2015) and Mordenkainen's Tome of Foes (2018). Mordenkainen's Tome of Foes specifically outlines the nine tiefling bloodlines of the Archdevils of the Nine Hells.

In August 2022, a playtest for One D&D updated the base tiefling to have "options encompassing all the Lower Planes. Infernal tieflings are tied to lawful evil planes like Acheron or the Nine Hells, abyssal tieflings to chaotic evil planes like the Abyss or Pandemonium, and chthonic tieflings to neutral evil planes like Gehenna or Hades. The options differ in their damage resistances, and in the spells they learn at first, third, and fifth level". In the 5.5e Player's Handbook (2024), tiefling remained a core player species option. This iteration included the three variants which correspond to different Lower Plane lineages.

== Fictional history ==
In the setting of Dungeons & Dragons 4th Edition, the tieflings trace their origins to the ancient human Empire of Bael Turath. In the Empire, the noble class was completely obsessed with preserving and gaining power. Rumors of their schemes and obsession with power reached a realm called the Nine Hells, located around the Astral Sea. The devils that resided in the Nine Hells gave the ruling classes of Bael Turath visions while they slept, containing the directions for a grisly, month-long ritual that would extend their rule into eternity. The details of the ritual have been left unclear in the books from the Player's Handbook series describing the events, though it is described as being very horrible. As the ritual demanded the participation of every noble house, those that refused were wholly slaughtered. Once this was done, the ruling class began their ritual. Afterwards, devils from the Nine Hells began to appear, and the nobles gladly made pacts with them. These pacts gave power to the nobles and their descendants forever, but also gave them the devilish features of horns, non-prehensile tails, sharp teeth, and red skin. From that point forward, the former humans were the race known as the tieflings.

In the 5th Edition, the overlord of the Nine Hells, Asmodeus, is cited as the ancestral source of their devilish features.

=== Aasimar ===
Aasimar are similar planetouched creatures with divine origins and serve as a counterpart to tieflings. During Dungeons & Dragons 2nd Edition, aasimar were portrayed as "descended from either the elegant Eladrin of Arborea, the Guardinals of Elysium, or the neutral Rilmani of the Outlands". Backstab described aasimar as "charming creatures protecting the universe against evil". A.V. Club reviewer Nick Wanserski found them an interesting player character race "for the chance to be unequivocally good in a way that's difficult to embody in real life". Aasimar were added to the 5.5e Player's Handbook as a core player species option, a choice lead designer Jeremy Crawford credited to the video game Baldur's Gate 3 (2023). Crawford explained that the "game did a good job of showing how awesome aasimar and tieflings are".

== Aspects ==
In earlier versions of Dungeons & Dragons, 3.5 and previous, tieflings have any of a number of features that reference (directly or indirectly) their fiendish lineage. These include horns located on their heads, pointed sharp teeth, extra fingers, cloven hooves in place of feet, tails, and unusually colored eyes. They exude a feeling of "evil" even though their race has become civil and no longer lusts for power. Many races distrust or outright hate tieflings, seeing them as devil worshippers. Tiefling villains often live up to this reputation, whereas player characters have the choice to abandon this stereotype.

In 4th edition and later, tieflings are a core character race and have had their appearance altered from 3.5 and earlier. All tieflings possess large thick horns of various styles on their heads, prehensile tails approximately 4 to 5 feet in length, sharply pointed teeth, and their eyes are solid orbs of red, black, white, silver, or gold. Tiefling skin ranges through common human shades right into the reds, ranging from brick red to a ruddy tan. Tiefling hair, which starts behind their horns, ranges from dark blue to purple to red in addition to more normal human colors.

Within the setting of Dungeons & Dragons 4th Edition, tieflings are characterized as charismatic and self-reliant, and make excellent warlocks, warlords, and wizards.

In Dungeons & Dragons 4th Edition, tieflings do not associate with a specific god or gods. Their lack of faith also means paladins and clerics are seldom, if ever, found. Tieflings have no homeland and are very rare due to a long-lasting war with the dragonborn, another race seen in the 4th edition of Dungeons & Dragons. Most tieflings prefer to be adventurers and rarely ever adventure with their own kin due to the prejudices of other races (people are concerned when two or more of their kind travel together).

In most editions, tiefling naming conventions consist of ancestral Infernal names. In 3.5, tieflings use human names until they seek to differentiate themselves from their parents, after which they usually take fiendish "names" of Infernal or Abyssal origin that sound menacing. In 4.0 onwards, tieflings usually take an ancestral Infernal name, although some young tieflings, striving to find a place in the world, choose a name that signifies a concept and then try to embody the concept.

In most editions, tieflings are described as slow to trust, but those who do earn their trust and loyalty earn a firm friend or ally for life.

== Alignment ==
Unlike half-fiends, tieflings are not necessarily of evil alignments. Tieflings of all alignments exist, including good, although many take more shady jobs, such as that of thieves, assassins or spies. Tieflings are often portrayed as antiheroes.

In a standard 3.0 and 3.5 game, tieflings tend to have an unsettling air about them, and most people are uncomfortable around them, whether they are aware of the tiefling's unsavory ancestry or not.

In 4th edition, tieflings have the same alignment choices as any other starting character.

In 5th edition, tieflings do not have an innate tendency towards evil, though many usually end up going down that path due to the prejudice against them. Also due to the prejudice against them, tieflings have a fierce independent streak and are inclined towards being chaotic.

== In various campaign settings ==
Tieflings appear in a number of campaign settings, including the following notable examples:

=== In the Forgotten Realms ===
In the Forgotten Realms campaign setting, both tieflings and aasimar are more common than in other settings. Tieflings even have elven and orc counterparts (Fey'ri and Tanarruk, respectively). In the 3rd Edition of Dungeons and Dragons, less common varieties of the tiefling were introduced, including a dwarven counterpart, the Maeluth and a halfling counterpart, the Wispling.

=== In Planescape ===
In the Planescape campaign setting, tieflings are a common race available to player characters, though they are mistrusted and reviled by many inhabitants of the planes.

=== In Exandria ===
In the campaign setting of Critical Role the first tieflings, also known as Devilkin, were created in the city of Vasselheim after a cabal of warlocks performed a ritual to contact fiendish forces, causing the birth of the first generation of tieflings. Asmodeus is often seen as the god tied to this particular race, although some myths mistakenly attribute their creation solely to him, and later than they have actually existed in this world. Despite the initial prejudice against them, after many centuries tieflings have become accepted in Exandria, even if they are not very common. Still, they prefer to avoid rural environments prone to superstition.

=== In Pathfinder ===
In the Pathfinder Roleplaying Game, tieflings are commonly known by the colloquial term Hellspawn. Due to limitations in the Open Game License, they are referred to exclusively by this term in the Pathfinder Tales novels. In the empire of Cheliax, tieflings are subjugated and often enslaved, despite the royal house's affiliation with Hell. Some tieflings have a stronger connection to one of the fiendish races, such as the grimspawn, who are descended from daemons, and the pitborn, who are descended from demons. There are also Kyton and other Fiend ancestries, with Devil ancestry Tieflings being called Hellspawn or Hellborn.

=== Notable tieflings ===
Livonia Darktongue appears in the book Weapons of Legacy in 2005.

=== In Urban Arcana ===
Tieflings are a playable race in Urban Arcana, which is based on the premise that races from Dungeons and Dragons exist on earth. Most tieflings in Urban Arcana are humans with horns, although more obvious appearances exist. To regular humans who cannot perceive shadow, they appear to be cynical humans—the horns are not visible to those unable to perceive shadow.

== In other media ==
In the PC game Planescape: Torment the player character is joined by Annah, a tiefling fighter/thief with a rat-like tail. In Baldur's Gate 2: Shadows of Amn the tiefling bard NPC Haer'Daelis can join the party. In Neverwinter Nights: Hordes of the Underdark, Valen Shadowbreath, a tiefling weapons master, is a recruitable henchman and potential romance option. Arden Swift is a tiefling NPC who plays a minor role in the last act of the campaign. In Neverwinter Nights II, tiefling is a playable race and Neeshka, a female tiefling rogue, can join the party. Tieflings are also a playable race in the online MMORPG Neverwinter. Two variants of tieflings are among the playable races in Dungeons & Dragons Online. Tiefling are among the playable races in Baldur's Gate 3 (2023). The game also includes the tiefling barbarian Karlach, who the player can pick as a playable or companion option, and a prominent subplot involving tiefling refugees escaping to Baldur's Gate.

The Brimstone Angels novels by Erin M. Evans, set in the Forgotten Realms, feature the tiefling warlock Farideh as the main character. One of the main characters in the Dungeons & Dragons comic by John Rogers, Tisha Swornheart, is a tiefling warlock. The Pathfinder Tales novels by Dave Gross feature the tiefling Rogue Radovan Virholt as one of the two primary protagonists.

Sophia Lillis portrays Doric, a tiefling druid, in the 2023 film Dungeons & Dragons: Honor Among Thieves. Doric also appears in a prequel novel—The Druid's Call (2023) by E.K. Johnston.

== Analysis ==
Johnny L. Wilson called tieflings "the paranoid, loner obverse" of halflings, who "believe that life is out to get them". Looking at the 2nd edition of the game, Wilson found them "suited to be great thieves" and "great point persons" due to favorable saving throw bonuses. Gus Wezerek, for FiveThirtyEight, reported that of the 5th Edition "class and race combinations per 100,000 characters that players created on D&D Beyond from" August 15 to September 15, 2017, tieflings were the sixth most created at 7,634 total; aasimar were the least popular at 1,767 total. The three most popular class combinations with the tiefling were warlock (2,188), sorcerer (1,062), and bard (806). Wezerek noted "some of the common character choices can be explained by the game's structure of racial bonuses".

In the academic journal Fafnir, Stefan Ekman observed that the tiefling illustration in the 5th edition's Player's Handbook, in contrast to the depictions of other races avoids connections to the familiar real world, and evokes "a mysterious atmosphere". The fantastic nature of the tiefling is also emphasized by depicting them using magic and giving them "outlandish costumes [...] designed largely according to a fantasy aesthetic rather than being modelled on historical apparel. Their fluid lines and (seemingly) light fabric vaguely suggest modern evening gowns but, according to textiles historian Viktoria Holmqvist, these clothes are more typically generic fantasy costumes." Philip J. Clements assumed tieflings are popular as player characters because they allow for "identity tourism" of a racial outsider: Tieflings in the game world "are often treated as dangerous outsiders. Yet D&D's default assumption is that the players will portray heroes. The idea of playing the racial outsider who nonetheless protects the people who wrongly revile them is a well-known trope built into D&D". Clements found this stereotype associated with the tiefling problematic, as the "solution is usually to focus on individual good, rather than confronting deeper, systemic problems of racial politics".

Mollie Russell of Wargamer noted that tieflings are "the clear winner of the D&D popularity contest", highlighting the "built-in edgy backstory" and high level of visual customization. Russell commented that while "roleplayers love a tiefling", the species does not have the mechanical draw for "power builders". Looking at the 5.5 edition of the game, she opined that the tiefling has fewer damage resistance options than the dragonborn and the dragonborn have additional mechanical benefits; while the tiefling have spell options unlike the dragonborn, Russell felt those options are weaker than the various spells the elven lineages have access to.
