= Dead Gods =

Dungeons & Dragons adventure for Planescape

- Rules required: Advanced Dungeons & Dragons, 2nd edition
- Authors: Monte Cook
- First published: 1997

Dead Gods is an adventure module for the second edition of the Advanced Dungeons & Dragons fantasy role-playing game.

== Plot ==
Dead Gods is composed of two adventures which revolve around the theme of death and resurrection of a god: "Out of the Darkness" and "Into the Light". Each adventure can be played separately, although the two plots can be woven together by the Dungeon Master.

"Out of the Darkness" consists of nine chapters. Long ago, Orcus the tanar'ri lord of the undead had grown fat and inattentive towards his realm in the Abyss. The minor demipower Kiaransalee, drow goddess of vengeance, conspired against Orcus and slew him, supplanting his realm and position and even banishing his name across the planes. The corpse of Orcus lay dead on the Astral Plane for some time, until he began to stir in the not-so-distant past. His form changed to become thin, small and shadowy, but rather than being truly restored to life he had become an undead god much less powerful than before. Orcus eventually disappeared from the Astral and chose a new name for himself: Tenebrous. He sought to gain revenge on everyone in the multiverse, and raised his former demonic servants as undead called visages to gather information to aid in his vengeance. He returned to an old base of his, a fortress on the Negative Energy Plane, and on the plane of Arborea he found a magical force called the Last Word which was potent enough to slay even a god. Kiaransalee had sent two of her drow followers to bury his powerful artifact, the Wand of Orcus, in an unreachable vault of stone on the plane of Pandemonium. In his search for his Wand, Tenebrous used the Last Word to slay Primus, the lord of the modrons, and using Primus's form he began using the modrons to search for his Wand. When the modrons discovered the two drow who had buried the Wand, Tenebrous began making preparations to take back the Abyss. The player characters must follow the clues to discover Tenebrous's scheme and keep the Wand away from him long enough for the power of the Last Word to consume him; if they succeed, the characters must then stop one of Orcus's followers from reviving his corpse on the Astral Plane yet again, to conclude the adventure.

"Into the Light" consists of three parts, and takes place in the city of Sigil. Many years ago, the last worshippers of a dead god brought the pieces of his body from the Astral Plane to Sigil and used the body to construct a monument of five standing stones. Some time later, when the significance of the monument had been forgotten, adherents of another religion built a temple around the standing stones; in time, this religion died out and was forgotten too. This church stood vacant for centuries until bought by a wealthy man named Cruigh Manathas, who ordered his workmen to tear it down. The workmen disappeared one day – unknown to all, they had been absorbed into the standing stones, as were those who came to investigate what happened to the workmen. Secretly, a fighter named Argesh Fiord has been in control of the situation and is using it in an attempt to foment a war between some of the city's factions in revenge for the death of his wife. The player characters must uncover Fiord's plot in order to resolve the matter and prevent the war.

== Publication history ==
Dead Gods was published in 1997, and was written by Monte Cook, with cover art by rk post and interior art by rk post, Adam Rex, and Josh Timbrook.

== Reception ==
Dead Gods was ranked the 14th greatest Dungeons & Dragons adventure of all time by Dungeon in 2004, on the 30th anniversary of the Dungeons & Dragons game.

== Reviews ==
- Shadis (Issue 44 - Jan 1998)
- Dragon Slayer
