= Doomguard =

Doomguard may refer to:

- The Doomguard, a faction within the Planescape setting of the Dungeons & Dragons role-playing game.
- Doom Guard, a demonic race in the Warcraft universe.
