= The Eternal Boundary =

Dungeons & Dragons adventure module

- Rules required: Advanced Dungeons & Dragons 2nd edition
- Character levels: 1 - 3
- Campaign setting: Planescape
- Authors: L. Richard Baker III
- First published: 1994

The Eternal Boundary is an adventure module for the 2nd edition of the Advanced Dungeons & Dragons fantasy role-playing game.

== Plot summary ==
The Eternal Boundary, the first adventure for the Planescape setting, focuses on a few key areas of Sigil. The player characters are hired to locate a madman who holds the key to a portal, and explore the slums of the Hive, meet the Bleak Cabal at the Gatehouse, and parley with undead in the vaults of the Mortuary. A fiery climax in another plane provides clues to a conspiracy.

== Publication history ==
The Eternal Boundary was written by L. Richard Baker III, and published by TSR, Inc.

== Reception ==
Rick Swan reviewed The Eternal Boundary for Dragon magazine #211 (November 1994). He suggests that when the player characters "can go anywhere in an infinite number of universes, it's hard to know where to begin. Eternal Boundary [...] comes to the aid of stymied plane-hoppers with an entertaining scenario". Swan concludes by saying: "Despite the reliance on familiar settings (a tavern, a mausoleum, a trap-filled citadel), the bizarre cast of characters and almost casual way that travelers flip between planes gives Eternal Boundary a feel all its own; you're unlikely to confuse it with a conventional fantasy adventure."

Shannon Appelcline comments that the designers of Planescape immediately included the ideas about the elemental planes from the Planescape Campaign Setting "in the first Planescape adventure, The Eternal Boundary (1994), which includes a trip to the Elemental Plane of Fire. Taking a page from Al-Qadim, The Eternal Boundary takes players to a set, civilized locale—a 'citadel of fire.'"

== Reviews ==
- Backstab #9
- Rollespilsmagasinet Fønix (Danish) (Issue 3 - July/August 1994)
