= The Planewalker's Handbook =

1996 role-playing game accessory by Monte Cook

- Author: Monte Cook
- Genre: Role-playing games
- Publisher: TSR
- Publication date: 1996
- ISBN: 0-7869-0460-7

The Planewalker's Handbook is an accessory for the Planescape campaign setting in the 2nd edition of the Advanced Dungeons & Dragons fantasy role-playing game, published in 1996.

== Contents ==
The Planewalker's Handbook is a supplement which aims to be a practical guide for Planescape players, compiling information from many sources as an encyclopedia of different topics in the multiverse.

== Publication history ==
The Planewalker's Handbook was published by TSR, Inc. in 1996.

== Reception ==
Trenton Webb reviewed The Planewalker's Handbook for Arcane magazine, rating it a 9 out of 10 overall. He quoted the song "it ain't what you do but the way that you do it... that's what gets results!" and noted "It's one of life's great quirks that trashy lines often contain valuable nuggets of philosophy. The lyrics of Fun Boy Three/Bananarama's hit is a case in point, because it encompasses the core ethic of The Planewalker's Handbook, A practical guide for players in the multiverse, it aims to teach both planars and primes that the secret of survival 'ain't who you are, it's what you know'." Webb continued: "And while The Planewalker's Handbook doesn't actually contain that much new information, the 'old' information it contains is clearly presented, logically ordered and well explained. Pulling facts from many different Planescape sources, the Walker's guide works perfectly as a beginner's introduction to the Planes. Yet the encyclopedic range of topics it deals with means that even old-hands will find there are some facts they didn't know and a few that they plain misunderstood the first time round." He added: "What makes The Planewalker's Handbook, truly great, though, is the fact that it lies to you. [...] On the jacket it claims to be a survival guide. And while to a lesser extent this is true, its real aim is to keep you alive just long enough to die somewhere really interesting. Players are fairly and squarely warned against the kind of innocent (but stupid) actions that will get them killed within seconds of arrival in Sigil. But this guide is so crammed with juicy hints about what the weirder Planes hold that beginners and experienced players alike will not be able to resist leaping headlong into even greater peril in an even more inhospitable place." Webb commented that "Codifying the sprawling worlds, peoples and powers of the Planescape multiverse is no mean feat. Essentially a Player's Guide, TPH's sense of style, graphic wit and Planescape's own brand of mind-bending lunacy means that, even if you know most of the facts it contains, the book remains massively readable. Written with precision, it progresses from the basic 'what are the planes and how to travel between them', through the factions of Sigil, to Planewalker kits and the kit they carry. So that by the time you get to the new 'Power of Belief' you're fully prepped and eager to tackle some of the fearsome mysteries of the system." He stated that "If your group is playing a Planescape campaign this is an essential purchase. If you're a referee thinking of trying a new system, buy this before the boxed set to get a real feel of just how wonderfully bizarre multiplanar adventures can be. In fact the only people who shouldn't consider getting hold of The Planewalkers Handbook are roleplaying virgins, and that's simply because Planescape is such a fast and loose system that a certain foundation of 'normal terrestrial adventures' help to keep the whole thing in perspective." Webb concluded the review by saying that "Because, as Kenny Rodgers once said, 'you've got to know when to walk away and know when to hide,' and that's the fun of Planescape - and it's what The Planewalker's Handbook aims to hammer home to berks before it's too late!"

== Reviews ==
- Dragon #236
