= Planescape: Torment =

1999 video game

- Cover art featuring The Nameless One as portrayed by producer Guido Henkel
- Developer: Black Isle Studios
- Publisher: Interplay Entertainment (Note: Published in Japan by Sega)
- Producers: Guido Henkel; Kenneth Lee
- Designer: Chris Avellone
- Programmer: Dan Spitzley
- Artist: Tim Donley
- Writer: Chris Avellone
- Composer: Mark Morgan
- Engine: Infinity Engine
- Platforms: Windows; Android; iOS; Linux; macOS; Nintendo Switch; PlayStation 4; Xbox One
- Release: December 10, 1999: Windows; NA: December 10, 1999; UK: January 7, 2000; Enhanced Edition; Android, iOS, Linux, macOS, Windows; April 11, 2017; Switch, PS4, Xbox One; October 15, 2019
- Genre: Role-playing
- Mode: Single-player

Planescape: Torment is a 1999 role-playing video game developed by Black Isle Studios and published by Interplay Entertainment for Windows. The game takes place in locations from the multiverse of Planescape, a Dungeons & Dragons (D&D) fantasy campaign setting. The game's engine is a modified version of the Infinity Engine, which was used previously for BioWare's Baldur's Gate, an earlier D&D game set in the Forgotten Realms.

Planescape: Torment is primarily story-driven, with combat taking a secondary role. The protagonist, known as The Nameless One, is an immortal man who forgets everything if killed. The game focuses on his journey through the city of Sigil and other planes to reclaim his memories of previous lives, and to discover why he was made immortal in the first place. Several characters in the game may join The Nameless One on his journey; most of these characters have encountered him in the past or have been influenced by his actions in some way.

The game was not a commercial success, but it received critical acclaim and has since become a cult classic, claimed by video game journalists to be the best role-playing video game of 1999. It was lauded for its immersive dialogue, for the dark and relatively obscure Planescape setting, and for the protagonist's unique persona, which shirked many characteristics of traditional role-playing games. It is commonly cited as one of the greatest video games of all time. An enhanced version for modern platforms was made by Beamdog and released for Windows, Linux, macOS, Android, and iOS in April 2017 and for Nintendo Switch, PlayStation 4, and Xbox One in October 2019.

== Gameplay ==
The Mortuary room in which the game opens; visible are two player characters, a zombie, the bottom-menu, and the radial-actions menu.

Planescape: Torment is built on BioWare's Infinity Engine, which presents the player with a pre-rendered world in an isometric perspective in which player characters are controlled. The game's role-playing ruleset is based on that of Advanced Dungeons & Dragons 2nd Edition. The player takes the role of The Nameless One, an immortal man with amnesia on a quest to learn why he was created immortal. Exploration around the painted scenery is accomplished by clicking on the ground to move, or on objects and characters to interact with them. Items and spells may be employed through hotkeys, quick slots, or a radial menu. An alternative to armor is the use of magical tattoos which can be applied to The Nameless One and certain other characters to enhance their abilities.

The game begins with character creation, where the player assigns attribute points such as strength, intelligence, and charisma to The Nameless One. The Nameless One starts the game as a fighter class, but the player may later freely change it to a thief or wizard. The player may recruit companions throughout the game to join the party. There are seven potential companions, but only a maximum of five may accompany The Nameless One at any given time. Conversation is frequent among party members, occurring both randomly and during conversations with other non-player characters. The gameplay often focuses on the resolution of quests through dialogue rather than combat, and many of the game's combat encounters can be resolved or avoided through dialogue or stealth. The Nameless One carries a journal which helps the player keep track of the game's numerous quests and subplots. The Nameless One is immortal, so running out of health points usually imposes no penalty beyond respawning in a different location.

Planescape: Torment uses the D&D character alignment system, in which a character's ethical and moral perspective and philosophy are determined based on the axes of "good vs. evil" and "law vs. chaos", with neutrality bridging the two opposing sides. The Nameless One begins as "true neutral" but can be incrementally changed based on the character's actions throughout the game, with reactions from the game's non-player characters differing based on his alignment.

== Synopsis ==
=== Setting ===
Planescape: Torment is set in the Planescape multiverse, a Dungeons & Dragons campaign setting which consists of various planes of existence, the creatures which live in them (such as devils, modrons, and deities), and the properties of the magic that infuses each plane. A large portion of Planescape: Torment takes place in Sigil, a large city located atop an infinitely tall spire at the center of the multiverse, that connects the planes with each other via a series of portals. The city is overseen by the powerful Lady of Pain, while numerous factions control different functions of the city related to each group's world view, with The Nameless One being able to join several of these factions during the game. The story eventually moves on to other planes, such as Baator and Carceri, where The Nameless One continues to discover more about his past. Throughout the game, The Nameless One slowly learns about his previous incarnations and the influence they have had on the world.

=== Characters ===
Planescape: Torment's protagonist is known as The Nameless One, a man cursed with immortality for thousands of years. Every time he dies, another person in the multiverse dies to fuel his resurrection. Upon rebirth, The Nameless One has little to no recollection of his past life, and often with completely different personality than before. When the game starts, The Nameless One wakes in a mortuary as a result of his latest death. He then sets out on a quest to discover how he died and why he is immortal, also hoping that the adventure will help him regain memories of his past incarnations.

During his quest, The Nameless One meets several characters who can join him as companions: Morte, Annah-of-the-Shadows, Dak'kon, Ignus, Nordom, Fall-From-Grace, and Vhailor. These playable characters can also interact with the Nameless One to further the game's plot. Morte is a cynical floating skull originally from Baator's Pillar of Skulls, a grotesque entity composed of the screaming heads of individuals who dishonestly advised others in their lifetime. He is introduced at the game's beginning in the mortuary. Morte loyally follows The Nameless One, partly out of guilt for having caused the deaths of some of his previous incarnations. The Nameless One meets Annah-of-the-Shadows, a young and brash tiefling rogue, outside the mortuary, but she does not join the group until a later point in the game. Dak'kon is a githzerai, who once made an oath to help The Nameless One until his death, but became enslaved to him for eternity due to not knowing of his immortality. Ignus is a pyromaniacal being who was once an apprentice mage of one of The Nameless One's past incarnations. Fall-From-Grace is a succubus who acts as proprietress of the Brothel of Slaking Intellectual Lusts in Sigil; unlike other succubi, she is not interested in seducing mortals. In the Rubikon Dungeon Construct, an optional game level, the Nameless One can find Nordom, a modron disconnected from its species' hive mind. Vhailor, found below the city of Curst on the plane of the Outlands, is essentially an animated suit of armor dedicated to serving merciless justice.

Notable non-player characters include Deionarra, a former lover of one of the Nameless One's past incarnations who died as a result of his amoral actions; Ravel Puzzlewell, a night hag who helped the Nameless One's first incarnation to become immortal; Trias the Betrayer, a fallen deva who decides to take matters into his own hands due to his disillusionment with the gods’ stance on fighting evil forces; Coaxmetal, a giant golem confined inside the siege tower in Sigil's Lower Ward who forges weapons for the inhabitants of the planes to destroy each other in the name of entropy; and the Transcendent One, the embodiment of the Nameless One's mortality and the final boss of the game.

=== Plot ===
The game begins when The Nameless One wakes up in a mortuary. He is immediately approached by a floating skull, called Morte, who offers advice on how to escape. Morte also reads the tattoos written on The Nameless One's back, which were inked there as reminders by a previous incarnation of himself, that contain instructions to find a man named Pharod. After a conversation with the ghost of Deionarra, and passing by enslaved undead who work at the mortuary, The Nameless One leaves to explore the slums of Sigil. He finds Pharod, who is the chief of an underground village of scavengers and the adoptive father of Annah, and is asked to retrieve a magical bronze sphere for him before he will give answers. After returning, Pharod does so, giving him further hints to help piece together his forgotten past. Later on, The Nameless One learns from a powerful sorcerer named Lothar that the night hag Ravel Puzzlewell caused his immortality, but that she is imprisoned in a magical maze for committing crimes against the Lady of Pain. The Nameless One eventually finds a portal to enter the maze, but realizes that it requires a piece of Ravel to activate it; for this, he locates a daughter of hers and takes drops of her blood.

Once in the maze, The Nameless One converses with Ravel, who asks him "what can change the nature of a man?" – a question that plays a prominent role throughout the game. Ravel is pleased with The Nameless One's answer because he offers his own thoughts; she claims she has killed many men in the past who, instead of giving their own answers, tried to guess what her answer, which they assumed was the only answer, might be. As the conversation progresses, Ravel explains that a past incarnation of The Nameless One had asked her to make him immortal. However, the ritual she performed was flawed, which causes The Nameless One to risk losing his memory each time he dies. She also reveals that the mortality she separated from him was not destroyed, and that as long as he was alive, his mortality must still be intact somewhere. Not knowing where it is, she suggests that the fallen deva Trias might know.

Ravel then attempts to keep The Nameless One and his party there by force, with them having to defeat her in combat. After they do so and leave the maze, Ravel is revealed to have faked her death. A being known as The Transcendent One then appears, and kills Ravel after a short conversation. The portal that The Nameless One and his party found in the maze takes them to the city of Curst, a gate town on the border of the Outlands and Carceri, to find Trias. Finding him magically imprisoned underneath Curst, The Nameless One offers to help free him in exchange for answers. Doing so, Trias then claims not to know where The Nameless One's mortality lies, but points him in another direction. The Nameless One then visits the Outlands and Baator, where he learns that his mortality lies in a place known as the Fortress of Regrets, and that only Trias knows how to access it. Meanwhile, however, Curst has "slid" from the border of the Outlands to the neighboring chaotic plane of Carceri due to the chaos unleashed by Trias after The Nameless One freed him. After fights through the city against large groups of demons, The Nameless One and his party reach Trias, who they also fight. After Trias is weakened enough through combat, he tells The Nameless One that the portal to the Fortress of Regrets is located within Sigil's mortuary, right next to where The Nameless One awoke.

In the Fortress of Regrets, The Nameless One encounters three of his past incarnations: one practical, one good, and one paranoid. The Nameless One learns that the "good" incarnation was the original man who was made immortal by Ravel, and learns that he had committed immeasurably terrible sins in his lifetime. Realizing that he would be damned to suffer in the Lower Planes when he dies, he sought immortality to give him time to atone for his sins. Unfortunately, the memory losses he suffered after each death and reincarnation foiled this plan. After merging with his past incarnations through dialogue or combat, gaining their combined experience and knowledge, The Nameless One confronts the embodiment of his mortality, The Transcendent One, who reveals that since being separated from The Nameless One, it has enjoyed its freedom and has been erasing clues that might lead The Nameless One to discover the truth. Depending on the player's choice, The Nameless One either slays The Transcendent One through combat, convinces it to rejoin with him, or commits suicide with a special weapon, with either option ending his immortality. The Nameless One then awakens on a battlefield in the Lower Planes, and accepts his fate to fight forever in the Blood War.

== Development ==
In 1997, the game's designers produced a 47-page document that outlined the game's premise and vision statement, and was used to pitch the idea to management at Interplay. Initially, the game was to be called Last Rites, and they described the game as "avant-garde" fantasy to distinguish it from high fantasy. The document also contained concept artwork for characters and areas of the game. It was released for Windows on December 10, 1999, in the United States and on January 7, 2000 in the United Kingdom, as one of three Planescape games being developed by Black Isle at the time, along with a PlayStation game by Colin McComb based on FromSoftware's King's Field, and a PC game by Zeb Cook; the other two were canceled, and only Last Rites was released as Torment. McComb, one of the designers of the overall Planescape setting, joined the Torment project after his game fell through.

Planescape Torment aims to provide its players with a sense that they are excavating a history (the avatar's forgotten past) while exploring, more or less at will, a vast and bizarre invention.

— Diane Carr, Game Studies

From the outset, Planescape: Torment's designers intended to challenge traditional role-playing game conventions: the game features no dragons, elves, goblins, or other common fantasy races; there are only three swords; the rats faced in the game can be quite challenging to defeat; and the undead sometimes prove more sympathetic than humans. The designers explained that most RPGs tend to have a "correct" approach to solving problems, which is almost always the morally good approach. They called this "predictable and stupid" and wished to make a game with greater moral flexibility, where a particular problem might have "two wrongs or two rights". The main quest is not about saving the world, but about understanding The Nameless One and his immortality. Death (of the protagonist or his companions) is often just a minor hindrance, and even necessary at times.

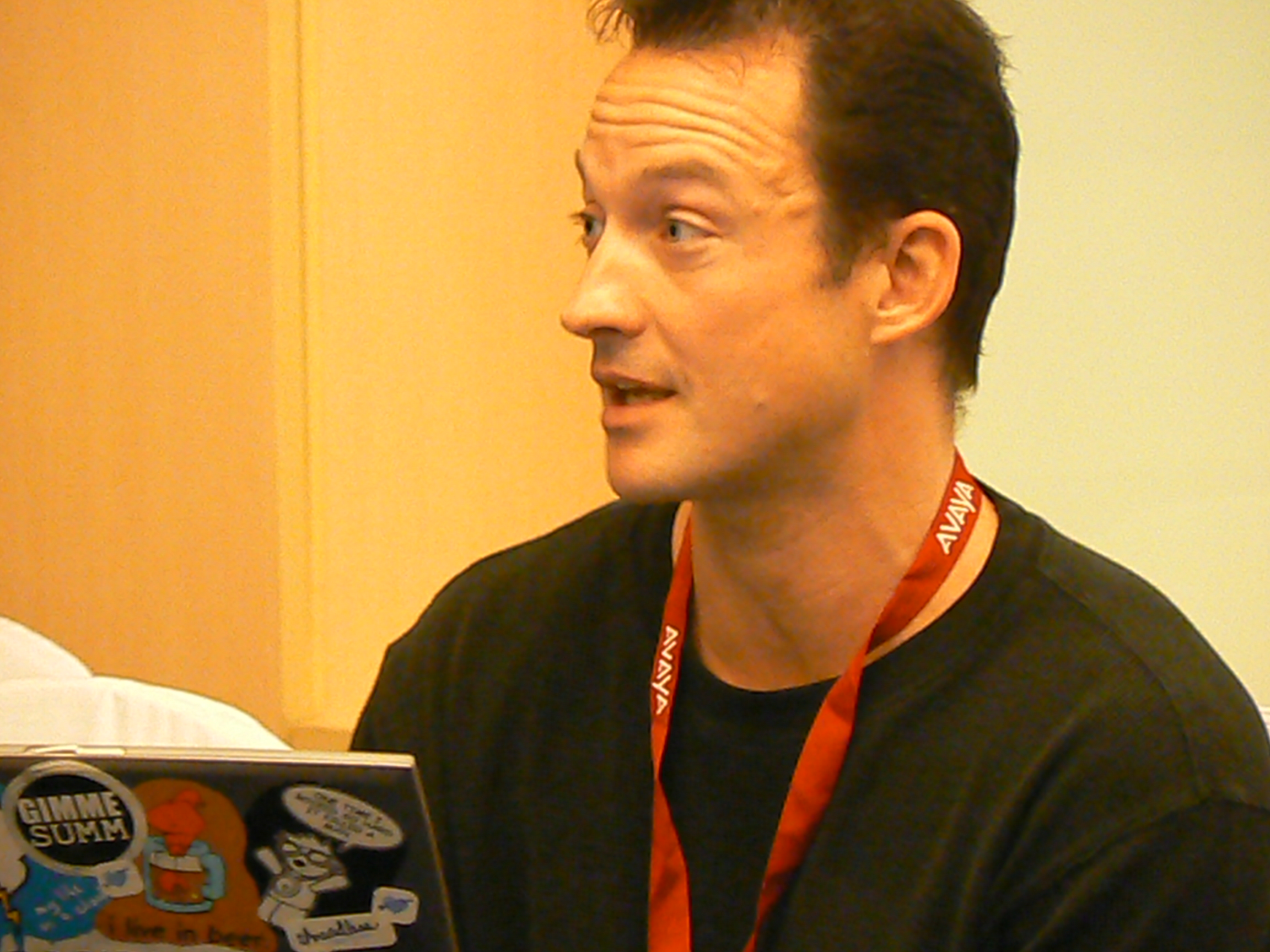
Lead designer and writer Chris Avellone in 2009

According to lead designer and writer Chris Avellone, Planescape: Torment was inspired by books, comics, and games, including Archie Comics, The Chronicles of Amber, The Elementals, and Shadowrun. The game's 1997 outline also makes references to The Lord of the Rings to describe some characters. While working on Planescape: Torment, Avellone was simultaneously working on Fallout 2. In an interview from 2007, he says that Fallout 2 helped him rethink the possibilities of dialogue in Planescape: Torment (and in later games he was involved with, including Neverwinter Nights 2). Producer Guido Henkel commented on simplifying the AD&D rules: "I think we still take the AD&D rules very seriously and we follow those rules. We just take the liberty of removing some of the 'overhead'." The game's credits also cite Final Fantasy VII as an inspiration.

On developing the character of Ravel Puzzlewell, Avellone thought a cryptic puzzle maker who was in love with the player character and who genuinely tried to help people only to have it backfire on her would make an interesting antagonist. Avellone likened Ravel's life to a branching bramble "stretching across the planes" and alluded to other incarnations of her that exist as characters in Avellone's other video game works; in a 2007 blog post, he considered his work on Ravel to be one of the experiences he is most proud of in his career, and that it informed his writing for the Knights of the Old Republic II character Kreia.

Avellone remarked that many of the ideas in the game "could only have been communicated through text, simply because no one would have the budget or resources to fully realise many of these fantasy works through TV or movies". Ultimately, Avellone has expressed some regret about the game's heavy focus on dialogue, as he feels this interfered with the overall game mechanics, particularly the combat system. The game's script contains around 800,000 words, after early previews had indicated that the game would be only about 20 hours long.

In several interviews, producer Guido Henkel stated that he was increasingly frustrated by the pressure the management of Interplay put on the development team after Interplay's initial public offering. Although only a few additional subplots and characters had to be discarded to meet the planned release date, he accused the Interplay management of disregarding the development team regarding things like package design and marketing. Henkel said that it was his main goal to prevent the game from being "crippled" before leaving Interplay when the game reached beta status. He also claimed that his overall influence on the game was greater than that of Avellone, Eric Campanella, or Dave Maldonaldo, but since a producer often has to make unpopular decisions, his role was later downplayed. In 2011, Henkel also revealed that The Nameless One's face on the game box art is based on his real face, because the day before the cover photo shoot was scheduled to take place, the model contracted to appear on the box backed out over a scheduling conflict, so Guido Henkel was proposed to use his face. Make up lasted for about two hours, and photography took 45 minutes, Henkel said: "My face was red as a beet and burned for the rest of the day, because of the solvent that was used to remove the appliances. Nonetheless, it was all well worth it".

The game used the Infinity Engine, a game engine initially developed by BioWare for Baldur's Gate. However, Planescape: Torment was being developed using the Infinity Engine before Baldur's Gate had been released, leaving the engine's acceptance in the market still unknown. Black Isle made modifications to the engine to suit the game. For example, playable characters were able to run, and both the character sprites and backgrounds were larger and more detailed. The greater size and detail was achieved by bringing the perspective closer to the ground. Magic was also an important part of the game's design, and a team of four designers worked solely on the visuals and mechanics of spells.

In addition to official localizations, for example the one by CD Projekt for the Polish market, fan communities developed Spanish, Hungarian, and Italian fan translations of the game. When Interplay dropped support for Planescape: Torment after the official 1.1 patch, several not yet fixed bugs were corrected by fan-created unofficial patches. Other mods add back items and quests omitted from the final version of the game or new features such as widescreen support.

Initially, Interplay hired dark ambient musician Lustmord to create the musical score for the game. He worked on the project for four months, writing over 40 original pieces. However, just six weeks before the game released, one of the producers had a change of heart on the game's musical direction, who wanted it to sound less ambient and "more along the lines of John Williams". His first time working on a video game project, Lustmord considered the experience "terrible", eventually reusing some of the elements from the score in his 2001 album, Metavoid. Needing a replacement soundtrack done quickly, Interplay then reached out and asked Mark Morgan, who had worked on other Black Isle Studios games, to do it. Two additional themes were penned by Richard Band. The game's cast of voice actors included Michael T. Weiss, Sheena Easton, Rob Paulsen, Mitch Pileggi, Dan Castellaneta, Keith David, Jennifer Hale, John de Lancie, and Tony Jay.

After the game's release, a reviewer for Game Revolution praised its sound, saying that "When you're in a crowded city, it sounds like a crowded city. Walk past a bar, and you'll hear the noise of the drunken patrons inside. Wander near a slave auction, and you'll hear the auctioneer calling. Go to a party in the festival hall, and it sounds just like a party". The same reviewer also stated "Planescape has just about the best sound I've ever heard in a game." IGN gave the sound 8.5 out of 10 and noted that "The game has fantastic speech and sound effects, but what's more impressive is the way they fade in and out depending on how close you're standing to them."

== Adaptations ==
A book by the same name was written by Ray and Valerie Vallese and released by Wizards of the Coast in 1999. The book's plot follows the game's only loosely, conferring a much bigger role to Fhjull Forked-Tongue, a minor supporting character from the game who advises the Nameless One to seek the Pillar of Skulls in the first layer of Baator for answers, and its ending differed significantly from the game's. The book also did not follow the source material in its adaptation of the game's characters; for example, in the game, the main character's lack of a name is a sign of his incomplete state and a source of protection in being anonymous. In the book, the protagonist chooses a proper name and is called "Thane" by his associates. Maciej Miszczyk from Hardcore Gaming 101 found the book to be "bland and uninteresting", offering "nothing new to those who’ve already beaten the game", and an "inferior alternative" for those who have yet to experience the game.

For the game's 2010 re-release on GOG.com, a second, more accurate, novelization produced by Rhyss Hess was bundled with it, based on the game script by Chris Avellone and Colin McComb.

A third novelization was completed in 2013 by fans through a combined amalgamation of the in game text, the Rhyss Hess novelization, and a text based Let's Play by the user ShadowCatboy on the forum Something Awful. The project was edited by Logan Stromberg and is widely regarded as the best adaptation of the game.

== Reception ==
Reception

Aggregate score
Aggregator	Score
Metacritic	91/100

Review scores
Publication	Score
AllGame	4.5/5
Eurogamer	7/10; 8/10 (after patch)
GamePro	4.5/5
GameRevolution	A−
GameSpot	9.0/10
GameSpy	90/100
IGN	9.2/10
PC Gamer (US)	93%
PC Zone	8.7/10
incite PC Gaming	4/5
Next Generation	5/5

Awards
Publication	Award
Computer Gaming World	RPG of the Year (1999)
GameSpot	RPG of the Year (1999)
IGN Vault Network	Game of the Year (1999)
Eurogamer	Best Male Lead Character (2000)
PC Gamer US	Game of the Month (2000)
GameSpy	Hall of Fame (2004)
GameSpot	Greatest Games of All Time (2005)
Gamasutra	Quantum Leap Award (2006)
IGN	71st in the Top 100 Games of All Time (2007)
PC Gamer	9th in the Top 100 Games of All Time (2008)
Game Informer	188th in the Top 200 Games of All Time (2009)
Bit-tech	30 PC Games to Play Before You Die (2009)
PC Gamer	Best RPG of All Time (2015)

Planescape: Torment received widespread critical acclaim upon its release. GameSpot's reviewer said that "It's clearly the best traditional computer role-playing game of the year", a comment which the website would later expand to "one of the greatest ever". Allen Rausch, writing for GameSpy's 2004 retrospective "A History of D&D Video Games", commented that Black Isle Studios "went way over the top for this one, crafting an utterly unique experience that has yet to be equaled by any RPG since". The gameplay was often compared to Baldur's Gate, another Interplay game that used the same engine as Planescape: Torment. Robert Mayer of Computer Games Magazine commented that it was "one dark and interesting game. There's lots of macabre humor, some rather deviant sexual references, and enough weirdness to send the devotees of Tolkienesque fantasy running for their copies of The Hobbit." Kieron Gillen of PC Gamer UK commented that "Planescape: Torment is attempting to be iconoclastic in the most stereotyped of genres. We're cheering it on."

The game's premise and writing were warmly received; a review in The New York Times noted "The game's level of detail and its emotional impact have prompted some players to cast about for literary peers." Reviewers were pleased with the ability to shape their character's journey as they wished. In 2005, GameSpot stated "Planescape: Torment has quite possibly the best implementation of role-playing an evil character ever to appear in a computer or video game to date". The heavily tattooed, egocentric, and potentially selfish Nameless One was welcomed as a change of pace from the conventional RPG hero, who was considered a predictable do-gooder. Reviewers also approved of the protagonist's ability to gain new powers by "remembering" past lives. The dark and diversified representation of the D&D setting of Planescape was lauded as a fresh departure from the traditional high fantasy of computer role-playing games. A review in Next Generation praised the game, saying that "Torment offers the best RPG gameplay anyone can find on store shelves, hands down." Uros Jojic of Actiontrip commented that "Planescape: Torment proves that it is possible to make an inventive, fun and refreshing game in this "sea of clones". Creating a computer edition of Planescape system is another triumph for Black Isle Studios." In a March 2000 article for Game Studies, Diane Carr called the game's setting "a freak show, a long story, a zoo, and a cabinet of talkative curiosities" and described the creatures and monsters in the game as "grotesque rather than scary". Cindy Yans of Computer Games Magazine describes the setting as "a world where knowledge and thoughts wield more power than the sword. Belief has the ability to reshape worlds, kill and resurrect powers and change the laws of physics." Cindy Vanous of Computer Games Magazine notes that "Planescape's bestiary features legions of the unknown, and its landscape is an ever-changing tapestry of the bizarre." Planescape: Torment is the first video game to be set in the Planescape universe.

[Planescape Torment's] limits are elusive.... Even small choices have multiple and unpredictable results, leading players to incidents, to confrontations or to nothing much. The game resists resolution or even comprehension. A rambling text like Planescape Torment bounces when you try and nail it down, it resists totalisation. It has its moments of "rush" and of confrontation, but it wants to be savoured, wandered through, in the company of armed companions.

— Diane Carr

The technical aspects of the game were also praised. Although by the time of its release in late 1999, Planescape: Torment's default 640x480 resolution was not considered particularly advanced, reviewers were pleased with the art design and color of the environments. The game's sound and music were described as "well above the norm" and "superb", and one reviewer stated that his only complaint about the music was that "there wasn't enough of it". Another reviewer said that Planescape: Torment had "just about the best sound" they had heard in a video game. GamePro stated, "... the characters talk with the talent of real professional voice actors during crucial bits of dialog". The game's graphics were moderately well received, with incite PC Gaming saying that "[the graphics] can be a little lackluster, although some of the spell effects certainly look very good", a statement echoed in NextGen which stated that "mind-blowing spell effects ... will remind you of a two-dimensional Final Fantasy game."

The game's interface received positive remarks. The US edition of PC Gamer commented on the automap, which automatically marked important locations and allowed the user to add custom notes, and on the journal, which separated completed quests from unfinished quests. PC Gamer also praised the fine-tuning of the Infinity Engine, such as the use of a radial menu, which allowed the player to stay focused on the game instead of managing multiple screens and "messing with windows and buttons".

... we were swept away by Planescape: Torment. It wasn't the effective engine, demented characters, or lavish lands that won us. It was the rich storyline. This tale is more a reflection of your true self than any game ever made.

— Darren Gladstone and Nikki Douglas

Criticism of the game was minimal and problems were generally described as minor, but included complaints about long load times on computers of the day, or the game slowing down during combat. Bugs were responsible for slowing down the game when a high level of graphical assets were on-screen at the same time, but it was reported that a fix was released that solved the problem. Allgame's Derek Williams considered the game's combat simplistic (with a comparison to Diablo), which made the game too easy. The most negative major review came from Eurogamer, who gave the game seven out of ten (and later increased it to eight when the game was patched). Their reviewer expressed distaste at the immortality of the player character, saying that it made the lives of characters "cheap and meaningless", although other reviews welcomed this aspect, saying it was "implemented perfectly" and did not make the game easier. Eurogamer also disapproved of the amount of experience that was awarded for certain dialogues later in the game. However, other reviews cited this as one of the main things that elevated Planescape: Torment above the standard RPG format. Some reviewers also criticized the game's pathfinding AI as being "less than impressive".

=== Awards ===
Planescape: Torment is commonly cited to as one of the greatest video games of all time and has attracted a cult following. It was given several Editor's Choice awards, was named RPG of the Year for 1999 by both GameSpot and Computer Gaming World, and won the Vault Network's Game of the Year for 1999. PC Gamer US named Planescape: Torment "Game of the Month" in their March 2000 issue (the issue in which the game's review appeared). The magazine also nominated Torment for its 1999 "Best Roleplaying Game" award, which ultimately went to System Shock 2. At the 3rd Annual Interactive Achievement Awards, Planescape: Torment was named as a finalist by the Academy of Interactive Arts & Sciences for "Computer Adventure/Role-Playing Game of the Year" and "Outstanding Achievement in Character or Story Development".

In 2006, The A.V. Club included Planescape: Torment in their list of "11 of Video Gaming's Strangest Moments", due to the game's use of death as a means to advance the plot. In 2006, Gamasutra polled video game industry professionals with the question: "Which role playing game over the entire history of the genre do you think has made the biggest 'quantum leap', and why?". Planescape: Torment was ranked second overall after Fallout, earning it a "Quantum Leap Award". The game also received an honorable mention for the same awards in the "Storytelling" category. In December 2008, IGN praised the game as having "some of the best writing and characterization seen in gaming". In 2009, Bit-tech included Planescape: Torment on their list of "30 PC Games to Play Before You Die". Avellone was awarded Eurogamer's "Gaming Globe" award for Best Designer in 2000 for his work on Planescape: Torment, and The Nameless One was considered to be the Best Male Lead Character.

IGN ranked Planescape: Torment second on their list of "The Top 11 Dungeons & Dragons Games of All Time" in 2014. Ian Williams of Paste rated the game #1 on his list of "The 10 Greatest Dungeons and Dragons Videogames" in 2015. PC Gamer included Torment on their best RPGs on PC list. It was placed at No. 13 on Game Informer's "Top 100 RPGs Of All Time" list, and was included among PCGamesN's "best RPGs on PC" as well.

=== Sales ===
In the United States, Planescape: Torment sold 73,000 copies by March 2000, a figure that Desslock of Computer Gaming World regarded as substandard. Comparing the game's commercial performance to that of Ultima IX: Ascension, Desslock remarked that "most of Torment's sales have been in the year 2000, while Ascension's sales were predominantly in 1999, even though Ascension was released later in 1999 than Torment." He attributed Torment's relative sales growth in its second year to positive reviews and word of mouth.

In the United Kingdom, Torment appeared at No. 3 on Chart-Track's weekly computer game sales list for the January 9–15, 2000 period. The game remained in the Chart-Track weekly top 5 for another two weeks, and secured a third-place debut on the firm's monthly top 10. Richie Shoemaker of PC Zone noted at the time, "January saw only one new release make an impact: the bizarre role-player from Black Isle Studios, Planescape: Torment." In the German market, the game sold 50,000 units by mid-2000, after debuting at No. 6 on the charts in January. It proceeded to claim positions 12, 30 and 53 from February through April. According to PC Player, Virgin Interactive was "only slightly disappointed" by its commercial performance in the region; writer Udo Hoffman noted that the game by nature was tailored to "a more mature and therefore smaller target group."

Ernest Adams of Gamasutra later described Torment's overall performance as a "commercial disappointment". According to Chris Avellone, the game was not a major monetary success, but was ultimately profitable. In 2017, Brian Fargo estimated the game's lifetime retail sales as roughly 400,000 units.

== Legacy ==
The game was re-released on DVD in 2009, and for purchase on GOG.com on September 28, 2010. Following the announcement of Baldur's Gate: Enhanced Edition, Beamdog's Overhaul Games announced their intention to make overhauls of more games set in the Dungeons & Dragons universes, at first naming only Planescape: Torment. They said that such a release would depend on the success of Baldur's Gate: Enhanced Edition. In November 2012, Penny Arcade Report wrote that Brian Fargo, the head of inXile Entertainment, had acquired the rights to Torment. In January 2013, Brian Fargo announced that the spiritual successor, titled Torment: Tides of Numenera, was in production and would be set in the Numenera universe created by Monte Cook. The game's design was led by Colin McComb, who helped design both the Planescape setting and Torment, and was released in February 2017. A sequel, titled Planescape: Unraveled, was under development by Beamdog following the completion of Baldur's Gate: Siege of Dragonspear. The project was designed by David Gaider, with Avellone serving in a consulting capacity. However, it was ultimately cancelled in 2016.

=== Enhanced Edition ===
Reception

Aggregate score
Aggregator	Score
Metacritic	PC: 85/100

Review scores
Publication	Score
GameStar	85/100
Hardcore Gamer	4.5/5
TouchArcade	5/5
Gameplanet	9/10

Planescape: Torment: Enhanced Edition, an upgraded version of the game, was created by Beamdog and released on April 11, 2017. It was announced in March 2017 for Windows, macOS, and Linux PCs, as well as for iOS and Android devices. It features similar improvements that Beamdog has done for the other enhanced editions. Avellone provided assistance by helping to curate the improvements to the game. Beamdog had access to the original source code and design documents for the game, and through that were able to recover and include some content that was dropped from the original release, using Avellone's assistance to flesh out parts that were incomplete or missing. They otherwise did not significantly change the game, with the studio's CEO Trent Oster saying that making larger improvements to their work would have been comparable to "basically going in and repainting the smile on the Mona Lisa here". Skybound Games, a division of Skybound Entertainment, released Beamdog's remastered version to Nintendo Switch, PlayStation 4, and Xbox One on October 15, 2019.
