= Nameless One =

Video game character

The Nameless One
- Planescape: Torment character
- The Nameless One (right) and his companion Morte (left), as depicted in promotional material for Planescape: Torment.
- First appearance: Planescape: Torment (1999)
- Created by: Chris Avellone
- Voiced by: Michael T. Weiss

The Nameless One is the player-controlled protagonist of the 1999 role-playing video game Planescape: Torment, developed by Black Isle Studios. He is depicted as a heavily scarred immortal who awakens in a mortuary without any memory of his identity or previous lives, and seeks to uncover the origin and consequences of his condition.

Unlike a fully customizable role-playing game avatar, the Nameless One has a fixed appearance and an extensive pre-existing history, while the player determines his character class, abilities, moral alignment and responses during play. This tension between an authored identity and player agency is central to his characterization. His tattoos further embody this tension, functioning as records of his forgotten history and as symbols of the consequences of his past and present actions.

The Nameless One has been discussed by critics and scholars for his departure from conventional fantasy protagonists, the relationship between his repeated deaths and player progression, and the game's treatment of identity, guilt, regret and responsibility across multiple incarnations.

== Conception and design ==
Lead designer and writer Chris Avellone identified Roger Zelazny's novels about amnesiac protagonists as the largest literary influence on the concept of the player character of Torment, who would both an antihero and an avatar, and whose appearance carried the burden of numerous painful lives. Bill Willingham's The Elementals, whose characters could survive severe physical damage and regenerate, contributed to the idea of a protagonist who could lose and regrow body parts. These influences were incorporated into the game's systems: death could solve problems, recovered memories could function as rewards, and parts of the Nameless One's body could be used as objects or sources of information.

Avellone said that he proposed the premise during his interview at Interplay, suggesting that the game begin after the player's death and have the protagonist awaken in the Mortuary to reconstruct preceding events. This approach made death a means of progression and discovery rather than only a failure state: the Nameless One could die repeatedly, recover memories through physical trauma and encounter traps or obligations left by earlier incarnations. The design formed part of a broader attempt to avoid familiar fantasy conventions. Rather than presenting a conventional quest to save the world, the team centered the narrative on a protagonist attempting to determine what he had done and why he could not remain dead.

=== Visual design ===
The development team gave the Nameless One a fixed, corpse-like appearance rather than the customizable body common to many role-playing game protagonists. The Last Rites character bible described him as physically and emotionally scarred, unable to die and visibly marked by repeated trauma. His scars and corpse-like condition were intended to demonstrate that his immortality was not a power fantasy. It also established that his conduct during play would determine aspects of his class, alignment and abilities despite his predetermined body and history. Because the team lacked the resources to make his body customizable, it instead allowed players to shape his personality through dialogue choices that altered his alignment and produced further consequences. Avellone said that amnesia also allowed the protagonist to begin as a neutral figure and enabled him and the player to discover the unfamiliar Planescape setting together.

The Symbol of Torment combines Deionarra’s entwined figure with the mirrored blade-shaped Rune of Torment.

The game's tattoo system serves both narrative and technical purposes. The Nameless One could equip tattoos and gain access to new designs according to what he had accomplished or experienced during play. To do so, the player may direct the Nameless One to visit Fell, a former servant of the Lady of Pain, the ruler of Sigil, whose symbolic language can be converted into magical tattoos. New tattoo designs become available after particular experiences, decisions and completed quests, and may be equipped to alter his abilities. The tattoos consequently operate both as equipment and as records of events that the Nameless One himself may otherwise be unable to retain.

According to Avellone, the system allowed the protagonist's equipment to reflect the player's actions, while also providing a practical alternative to multiple sets of armor, which the development team lacked the resources to create for the protagonist and his companions. Game scholar Jeff Howard related the Symbol of Torment, tattooed on the Nameless One's right arm, to character artist Eric Campanella's explanation that its intertwined female figure represents Deionarra, a former love interest who was exploited by a ruthlessly practical incarnation of the Nameless One, and others betrayed or harmed by the character, while its matching polished and corroded halves symbolize the Nameless One and his divided relationship with the Transcendent One.

For the game's cover, producer Guido Henkel served as the model after the originally booked model withdrew shortly before the photo shoot. Makeup artist Tom Burman used latex appliances and hand-painted makeup to transform Henkel into the character.

=== Companions ===
The relationships between the Nameless One and his companions were partly shaped by production limitations. Avellone explained that the team could not implement the kind of system in which companions freely abandoned the party in response to the protagonist's conduct. The writers instead developed the idea that suffering individuals were drawn into the Nameless One's orbit and had often encountered one of his previous incarnations. Optional conversations reveal how those incarnations affected companions and allow the current Nameless One to influence them in return; Avellone identified Morte, the pyromaniac mage Ignus, and the githzerai warrior Dak'kon as prominent examples. Avellone separately named Morte's eventual revelation to the player as one of his favorite sequences in the game.

Romantic interaction was contemplated as part of the Nameless One's relationships with his companions; the original pitch described recruitable allies as including both friends and potential romantic interests. The character bible portrayed the tiefling Annah as strongly attracted to the player character but unable to respond to affection without confusion, hesitation or hostility, while Fall-from-Grace was conceived as a "puritan succubus" who had rejected sexual contact and innuendo. Avellone later said that Annah and Fall-from-Grace were loosely inspired by Betty and Veronica from Archie Comics, and identified their dialogue as among the material he most enjoyed writing.

The current incarnation of the Nameless One can form differently framed romantic connections with Annah and Fall-from-Grace; if questioned about the Nameless One's feelings, the player may acknowledge an attachment to either woman or to both. Annah's attraction is expressed through insults, jealousy and defensive hostility, and sympathetic dialogue choices can encourage her to admit her feelings and culminate in a kiss. The Nameless One's connection with Fall-from-Grace develops more indirectly through conversations about her experiences, self-control and rejection of a succubus's conventional role. After he recovers his identity in the Fortress of Regrets, Grace refuses to regard their separation as final and promises to seek him in the Lower Planes. Neither relationship receives a conventional resolution by the end of the game.

== Appearances ==
=== Planescape: Torment ===
Planescape: Torment begins in medias res with the Nameless One's awakening on a slab in the Mortuary in the city of Sigil, without any memory of his identity. He encounters the floating skull Morte, who explains to him that his previous deaths have repeatedly erased his memories. Morte reads instructions tattooed across his back, which directs him to locate a journal and seek a man named Pharod, making the tattoos the first external record through which he begins reconstructing his history. Once outside the Mortuary, the Nameless One begins an investigation into his repeated deaths and forgotten lives. As he travels through Sigil and other planes, the Nameless One encounters people, locations and objects affected by his previous incarnations. Their accounts reveal that these earlier selves differed radically in temperament and included compassionate, paranoid and practical versions of the same man. Some attempted to preserve information for their successors, while others destroyed it or exploited companions in pursuit of their own goals.

Morte initially presents himself as the Nameless One’s friend and guide, but messages left by an earlier incarnation warn the protagonist not to trust him. Morte later explains that the Practical Incarnation removed him from the Pillar of Skulls after forcing him to promise lifelong service. Although later incarnations no longer remembered that agreement, Morte continued accompanying the Nameless One after witnessing the pain and disorientation caused by each resurrection. The Nameless One eventually learns that his original incarnation sought immortality to escape punishment in the Blood War. Hoping to avert this fate, the original incarnation persuaded the night hag Ravel Puzzlewell to make him immortal. Ravel’s ritual separated his mortality from his body, but each death could erase his memories and produce a new incarnation.

The investigation leads the Nameless One to the Fortress of Regrets, where he encounters three earlier incarnations and may recover their memories and knowledge. He then confronts the Transcendent One, the independent embodiment of the mortality removed by Ravel. The Transcendent One has preserved its freedom by destroying evidence, dispatching shadowy creatures to kill the Nameless One, and preventing successive incarnations from discovering the Fortress. The final confrontation may be resolved through force, persuasion or self-sacrifice, but ending the separation restores the Nameless One's mortality. Having recovered the knowledge of his original crimes, he accepts their consequences and awakens on a battlefield in the Lower Planes to begin his sentence in the Blood War, which ends the game.

=== Novelization ===
In the official novelization of Planescape: Torment, which is only loosely based on the video game's plot, the Nameless One's backstory is drastically different: he was once a human being who made a pact with the fiend Fhjull Forked-Tongue, offering his service as a soldier in the Blood War in exchange for his town being spared. He then sought a way to become immortal to avoid the Blood War entirely; all of his most recent struggles are, in fact, the culmination of the machinations of Fhjull to claim The Nameless One's soul. The Nameless One's ability to recall memories from prior incarnations, beginning with the one that wakes up in the Mortuary, is due to being dosed prior to awakening in the Mortuary with a special elixir derived from the waters of the River Styx by Fhjull Forked-Tongue.

== Reception and analysis ==
=== Critical reception ===
Contemporary and retrospective critics identified the Nameless One as one of the principal ways in which Planescape: Torment departed from conventional fantasy role-playing games. Writing for GameSpot, Greg Kasavin praised his scarred and tattooed appearance as a contrast to the conventional role-playing hero and considered the search for his origins one of the game's central attractions. Game designer Ernest Adams similarly praised the use of amnesia and the ambiguity surrounding the character's search for mortality, arguing that his ignorance of the setting was narratively plausible without reducing him to an empty vessel. Andrew Park of GameSpot described him as grotesque rather than conventionally heroic and argued that the combination of immortality, recovered memories and moral choices created an unusually personal relationship between player and character. Kimberley Wallace of Game Informer wrote that the premise avoided becoming a disposable amnesia plot because successive revelations about the Nameless One's identity made discovery compelling.

Darshana Jayemanne of Kill Screen regarded the character as central to the game's reversal of fantasy conventions. Rather than entering a tomb on a heroic quest, the Nameless One begins by escaping a mortuary, while dialogue and charisma frequently prove more effective for him than combat. Igor Krai of the Russian magazine Mir Fantastiki similarly considered the Nameless One's journey integral to the game's representation of the Planescape setting. Krai argued that the planes function not as conventional dungeons to be conquered but as spaces in which the protagonist searches for himself, encountering multiple facets of his identity alongside allegories and philosophical questions.

The gradual disclosure of Morte's relationship with the Nameless One has also been singled out for its emotional effect. A retrospective published through Game Developer argued that the disclosure recontextualizes Morte’s comic-relief role: he remained with later incarnations because he had witnessed their repeated suffering and felt sympathy for them. The writer considered the resulting relationship effective because Morte's loyalty developed from guilt, sympathy and accumulated experience rather than from a visible approval system.

Commentary has frequently focused on the tension between the Nameless One's fixed history and the player's control over his current identity. Park described the cycle of death, resurrection and memory loss as the condition driving his search for his identity and the cause of his immortality, requiring players to interpret fragmentary memories and conversations for themselves. Although the broad narrative is comparatively linear, he believed that ethical choices and interpretive gaps allow players to make the character's story their own. Diane Carr describes him as both an authored protagonist and a mutable avatar, arguing that his class, alignment and abilities develop alongside the recovery of memories and that death therefore becomes part of avatar construction rather than merely a penalty. Evan Torner uses the game to discuss immersion as the experience of assuming another's role and producing consequences through action. Tom Tuček likewise distinguishes the Nameless One from the game's controllable companions, noting that his body and past cannot be replaced even as the player continually alters his moral, statistical and professional qualities. In Tuček's reading, amnesia enables player identification without making the protagonist historically empty. Trent C. Ward of IGN noted how the Nameless One's amnesia regarding his many skills results in "a game in which having someone jog your memory for you can be much more valuable than having them give you a powerful magic item."

Chris Dahlen of The Escapist singled out the Nameless One's developing relationship with Annah as an effective example of dialogue-driven romance. He wrote that Annah's indirect and confrontational flirting drew him into role-playing because an inappropriate response could derail the relationship, creating tension through conversation rather than visual spectacle. Dahlen considered the resulting improvement to Annah's attributes incidental to the experience of pursuing the relationship. In a later comparison with the romances in Mass Effect, he praised the extended emotional buildup between the Nameless One and Annah, despite its conclusion being limited to a kiss.

Eurogamer gave him the Gaming Globes 2000 award in the category Male Lead Character. Empire placed the character as fourth on a list of the greatest video game characters, stating that "if you're looking for one of the most original, inspired and fascinating characters since gaming began, then look no further than The Nameless One" and "rather than other RPGs of the era, which gave you a blank slate character to flesh out as you wanted, Torment's strength was in the detail and richness of its protagonist, who remains one of the very best more than ten years on." In 2012, GamesRadar ranked him as the 45th "most memorable, influential, and badass" protagonist in games, commenting: "Recovering the fragments of The Nameless One’s past through his various incarnations is an emotional journey that reveals him to be a character that has truly suffered many lifetimes’ worth of anguish. Though you can imprint your own philosophical views on him through the game's long-winded dialog, he's still a fully realized and impressively developed character all his own." In 2011, UGO.com ranked him at number two on the list of their favorite immortal characters in entertainment, adding "sometimes, living forever just ain't worth the hassle."

=== Analysis ===
Academic interpretation has examined the character's relationship to guilt, regret and redemption. Philosopher Steven Gubka reads the story as an argument that regret can alter moral character because the player's repeated choices determine whether the current incarnation responds to past wrongdoing through denial, further exploitation or attempts at atonement. He relates this structure to Aristotle's account of virtue as a disposition cultivated through action and contrasts it with Baruch Spinoza's suspicion of regret. Tuček similarly argues that the character's fixed past prevents role-playing from becoming pure self-invention and requires the player to judge whether someone already responsible for serious wrongdoing can be redeemed.

Literary scholar Stephen M. Yeager compares the Nameless One and Disco Elysium protagonist Harry Du Bois to the literary figures Percival and Sam Spade. Yeager interprets their missing memories as metafictional devices that defer a final quest for redemption while allowing episodic encounters and investigations to accumulate. Michael Hancock interpreted the Nameless One through conventions of Gothic fiction. He argued that the character is haunted mentally by his former selves and physically by the effects of immortality, which have rendered his body corpse-like and monstrous. The Nameless One's eventual confrontation with the Transcendent One externalizes this divided identity: rather than restoring order by defeating a wholly separate monster, the protagonist confronts the independent mortality severed from him and must end the unnatural division between them. Hancock observed that this is yet marker of the character's resistance to ordinary categories and departure from a conventional Gothic narrative, because the protagonist and the disruptive monster are essentially the same figure. He further connected the character's repeated deaths and alignment choices to the repetitive, choice-driven structure of video games.

Howard interpreted the tattoos as symbolic quest objects connecting narrative memory, player choice and character development. He argued that individual designs record the outcomes of quests on the Nameless One's body while also granting corresponding gameplay advantages, causing the avatar's visual and statistical configuration to reflect the player's actions. Howard viewed the Symbol of Torment as the culmination of this system because it condenses the history and cosmology underlying the protagonist's forgotten memories, including his separation from the Transcendent One. Matt Barton similarly identified the tattoo system as one of the game's distinctive innovations, observing that it both increases the character's attributes and documents the player's progress.

== Legacy ==
Retrospective commentary has used the Nameless One as an example of a role-playing protagonist positioned between a predefined character and a blank player-created avatar. Patrick Dugan, writing for Game Developer, regarded the replacement of a purely empty vessel with a layered identity uncovered through interaction as the game's principal innovation. Fraser Brown of PC Gamer similarly placed the Nameless One between those two models, observing that he has an established history and relationships while giving the player substantial freedom over his conduct once play begins.

In 2009, Mir Fantastiki included the Nameless One in its “Hall of Fame” feature devoted to fictional immortal characters.

In its 2018 ranking of role-playing games, Game Informer described the Nameless One as one of gaming's most complex and memorable characters, emphasizing that apparently minor player choices could produce unexpected narrative consequences.
