= Factions of Planescape =

Fictional groups in Dungeons & Dragons

The factions of Planescape are fictional philosophical and political organizations in the Planescape campaign setting for the Dungeons & Dragons role-playing game. Introduced in the 1994 Planescape Campaign Setting, the original fifteen factions served both as character affiliations and as institutions responsible for much of the administration of Sigil. Each advanced a different explanation of reality in a setting where belief can physically affect the multiverse.

The factions became one of the setting's defining features. Contemporary critics treated their competing ideologies as central to Planescape's emphasis on role-playing and philosophical conflict, while later commentary discussed their use as character archetypes, political institutions and expressions of the player's internal conflicts.

== Conception and design ==
Designer David "Zeb" Cook summarized the intended tone of the setting as "philosophers with clubs". Faction membership was presented as an optional but important component of character creation. Each group supplied a worldview, institutional support and mechanical advantages and disadvantages in addition to a character's race, class and alignment.

The factions initially received relatively brief descriptions in the campaign boxed set. The 1995 supplement The Factol's Manifesto expanded them through accounts of their histories, internal divisions, leaders, headquarters, rivalries and abilities available to members.

In adapting elements of the Planescape setting for the 5th edition of Dungeons & Dragons, lead designer F. Wesley Schneider said that the creative team retained factions which continued to work for a modern version of the setting, while combining organisations and changing some philosophies. The Hands of Havoc, for example, combined elements of revolutionary and anarchist groups into an organisation presented partly as freedom fighters.

== Role in the setting ==
In the original setting, the Lady of Pain permitted fifteen official factions to operate in Sigil. Although she remained the city's ultimate authority, the factions performed much of its ordinary political, judicial, commercial and civic administration. They also competed in an ideological struggle for adherents, since the setting treats belief as a force capable of changing reality.

Most factions used a common hierarchy. A faction's leader was known as its factol, senior officers as factors, full-time operatives as factotums, and ordinary or less committed members as namers. Their philosophies were deliberately simplified and taken to extremes.

== Original factions ==
The original campaign setting presented fifteen recognized factions. Each supplied its members with a philosophical identity, allies, enemies and game-mechanical benefits and restrictions. Most also controlled a prominent headquarters or performed a civic function in Sigil, although groups such as the Free League and Revolutionary League deliberately avoided centralized leadership.

Faction	Common name	Philosophy	Headquarters and role in Sigil
Athar	Defiers	The beings commonly worshiped as gods are powerful planar entities rather than genuinely divine beings. The Athar seek evidence of a greater and unknowable source of divinity beyond them.	The Shattered Temple, formerly dedicated to the dead god Aoskar. The faction monitors religions and offers refuge to people who have rejected their former faiths.
Believers of the Source	Godsmen	All existence is a series of tests through which any being may improve, reincarnate and ultimately attain divinity.	The Great Foundry. Its members operate workshops and forges, treating skilled labor and creation as part of the process of spiritual advancement.
Bleak Cabal	Bleakers	The multiverse has no inherent meaning or rational purpose. Individuals must confront this absence of meaning and decide how to live despite it.	The Gatehouse, which includes Sigil's asylum, poorhouse and charitable services. Many Bleakers respond to their philosophy through practical compassion toward people in distress.
Doomguard	Sinkers	Entropy, destruction and decay are fundamental and unavoidable properties of the multiverse. Different members disagree over whether entropy should merely be observed or actively hastened.	The Armory, where weapons and armor are manufactured and distributed. The faction also maintains strongholds on the negative quasi-elemental planes.
Dustmen	The Dead	Ordinary existence is an incomplete or false form of life. By suppressing passion and attachment, a person may eventually reach the state the faction calls True Death.	The Mortuary, where the Dustmen collect, prepare and dispose of Sigil's dead. Their duties give them authority over funerary practices and access to portals associated with death.
Fated	Takers	Individuals possess only what they have the ability and will to acquire, defend and retain (a position akin to "might makes right", and achievement through work). Dependence on charity or unearned assistance is treated as weakness.	The Hall of Records. The faction administers taxation, property registration, financial records and many of the city's commercial claims.
Fraternity of Order	Guvners	The multiverse operates according to discoverable laws. By identifying and mastering those laws, an individual may gain power over reality itself.	The City Court. The faction supplies judges, advocates, clerks and legal administrators, and studies both Sigil's laws and the principles governing its portals.
Free League	Indeps	No single philosophical system should control an individual's choices. Members value personal freedom and reject the authority and internal discipline imposed by formal factions.	The Great Bazaar serves as an informal center, although the Free League has no factol or official hierarchy. Its members include merchants, travellers and other politically unaffiliated residents.
Harmonium	Hardheads	Peace can exist only when all beings accept a common and orderly system of conduct. The faction is willing to impose that harmony by coercion or force.	The City Barracks. The Harmonium serves as Sigil's principal police force, patrols the streets and arrests people accused of breaking the city's laws.
Mercykillers	The Red Death	Justice consists of identifying guilt and carrying out the deserved punishment. Mercy is considered an interference with justice rather than a virtue.	The Prison. The faction guards prisoners, executes sentences and pursues fugitives after judgement has been entered against them.
Revolutionary League	Anarchists	Every established institution eventually becomes corrupt and oppressive. Existing factions and governments must therefore be infiltrated, undermined and destroyed.	The faction has no public headquarters or unified leadership. Its members operate through independent cells, safe houses and agents embedded within other organisations.
Sign of One	Signers	Each individual is potentially the center and author of reality, and the multiverse may exist because it is imagined by a sufficiently powerful mind.	The Hall of Speakers. The faction presides over political debate and legislative business, giving its members substantial influence over the city's laws and policies.
Society of Sensation	Sensates	Truth can be understood only through direct experience. Members seek a broad range of sensations and emotions, including pain, fear and loss rather than pleasure alone.	The Civic Festhall, which contains theaters, galleries, performance spaces and sensory-recording chambers. The faction oversees much of Sigil's artistic and cultural life.
Transcendent Order	Ciphers	Thought can obstruct enlightened action. By uniting instinct, body and mind with the rhythm of the multiverse, an individual can act correctly without conscious deliberation.	The Great Gymnasium, where members practice physical, mental and spiritual disciplines. The faction generally avoids Sigil's political alliances.
Xaositects	Chaosmen	Chaos is the genuine nature of the multiverse, while order and stable meaning are artificial constructions.	The Hive. The Xaositects have little formal organisation and do not perform a consistent civic function, instead gathering in shifting groups whose leadership and activities frequently change.

== Publication history ==
The factions were introduced in the 1994 Planescape Campaign Setting and expanded in The Factol's Manifesto the following year.

The 1998 adventure Faction War dismantled the original political arrangement. Several factions were dissolved or merged, while others were expelled from Sigil or continued operating without official authority. The result ended their collective control of the city's institutions and was intended to provide a substantially altered status quo for later campaigns.

Released for the fifth edition of D&D, the 2023 boxed set Planescape: Adventures in the Multiverse restored the factions to a formal role in Sigil's administration, but reorganized them into ascendant and minor factions. Ascendant factions are the twelve most influential organisations in the city and oversee aspects of its government, economy and daily life. Ten of the original fifteen factions returned as ascendant factions: the Athar, Bleak Cabal, Doomguard, Fated, Fraternity of Order, Harmonium, Mercykillers, Society of Sensation and Transcendent Order, along with the former Dustmen under the name Heralds of Dust. The remaining two ascendant factions are the Mind's Eye, formed from the post-Faction War union of the Believers of the Source and Sign of One, and a new faction called the Hands of Havoc.

== In other media ==
Several factions, including the Believers of the Source, the Dustmen, the Revolutionary League, the Society of Sensation, the Xaositects, perform narrative and gameplay functions in the 1999 video game Planescape: Torment. They control several important locations in Sigil, provide quests and dialogue, and allow the Nameless One to affiliate with some of their ideologies.

== Reception ==
Contemporary reviewers identified the factions as one of Planescape's defining elements. Scott Haring of Pyramid interpreted Cook's "philosophers with clubs" conception as the setting's central idea. Haring wrote that this idea transformed alignment and ideology from background role-playing details into the principal subject of the setting. He praised the groups as colorful and distinctive, particularly the Fraternity of Order, Society of Sensation, Dustmen and Doomguard. Gene Alloway of White Wolf praised the campaign setting's emphasis on role-playing and critical thought rather than routine combat, and regarded its combination of adventure, deities, philosophies and magic as one of the reasons the setting functioned cohesively.

Isaac Perry of Game Informer argued that the factions are not conventional military alliances but philosophical positions taken to extremes. Because belief has material power in the setting, he interpreted their competition as both a source of instability in Sigil and a personification of conflicting ideas within the player.

Jody Macgregor of PC Gamer discussed the Society of Sensation and its Sensorium, as depicted in Planescape: Torment, as an example of the game giving greater complexity to a faction that could otherwise appear devoted only to spectacle or pleasure. The Sensorium allows stored experiences to be shared, including memories associated with grief, isolation and other painful emotions.

A retrospective review at RPGnet compared the system with the factional character groupings common in 1990s role-playing games, but argued that the Planescape factions were comparatively flexible because they provided goals and social support without completely determining a character's personality. Later RPGnet reviews evaluated the factions both as elements of the setting and as tools for character design. One reviewer considered membership an important means of defining how a character thinks, while another praised the groups for providing archetypes, institutional support and goals. The latter nevertheless noted that parties containing members of directly opposed factions could create practical difficulties during play.

Reception of the fifth-edition treatment was mixed. Mollie Russell of Wargamer called the factions one of the original setting's most iconic features, but criticized their compression into seven pages and argued that the revised material reduced the philosophical conflict and grim tone associated with earlier Planescape products. Joel Franey of GamesRadar+ considered the revised factions flavorful, but thought the setting book overemphasized them relative to other unusual elements of Sigil while providing descriptions too brief to be fully useful.
