= Tales from the Infinite Staircase =

Tales from the Infinite Staircase is a 1998 role-playing game adventure published by TSR for Advanced Dungeons & Dragons.

== Contents ==
Tales from the Infinite Staircase is an adventure in which a band of planewalkers uses the Infinite Staircase to investigate a hidden, plane‑spanning threat through eight interlinked adventures. These adventures can be played in any order, their events reshape one another and their locations evolve over time.

== Reviews ==
- Backstab #10
- Realms of Fantasy
