= Faction War =

Adventure module for Dungeons & Dragons

Cover to the Planescape Faction War adventure

Faction War is a book published by TSR in October 1998. Part of the Dungeons & Dragons series. It was a published adventure meant for those who were playing in Dungeons & Dragons's fantasy role-playing game Planescape campaign setting, also published by TSR.

== Synopsis ==
The culmination of several adventures leading up to that point, The Faction War brought an end to the factions' control of the city. Instigated by the power-hungry Duke Rowan Darkwood, factol of the Fated, in a bid to dethrone the Lady of Pain and rule Sigil himself, the war spread throughout the city before the Lady of Pain, with the aid of a group of adventurers (the players' characters), intervened.

== Results of the Faction War ==
In the Dragon Magazine #315 (January 2004) the result of the Faction War were as follows:

- The Believers of the Source, the Mercykillers, and the Sign of One were wiped out in the fighting, while the Bleak Cabal, the Dustmen, the Free League, the Society of Sensation, the Transcendent Order, and the Xaositects disbanded (although many former members continue to hold the same beliefs as they did under faction rule). The six remaining factions chose to leave Sigil behind. All former faction leaders gave up their claims to control over the city, handing it over to elected civil servants.
- The Mercykillers were forced to split into two much smaller groups, the Sons of Mercy and the Sodkillers—two smaller factions which long ago joined to form the Mercykillers. The Sons of Mercy are concerned with redeeming and rehabilitating criminals, whereas the Sodkillers believe in simply exterminating them. Both remained in Sigil.
- The survivors of the Believers of the Source and the Sign of One merged into a completely new faction known as the Mind's Eye.
- The Athar fled the city to the base of the Spire, the region of the Outlands where all magic (including that of the gods) fails, to escape the wrath of the deities whom they defied. Their membership has declined due to the isolation of their new base.
- The Doomguard was decimated in the Faction War. Most of its survivors fled to the four Inner Planar citadels maintained by the faction on the borders of the Negative Energy Plane. The Doomguard now rarely leave their citadels, making forays outside only when some great act of creation (such as the formation of a new demiplane) demands a retributive act of destruction.
- The Fraternity of Order relocated to the plane of Mechanus, where they already had several strongholds. The Guvners continue to delve into the laws of the planes and plot their eventual return to Sigil, which they still believe to be the fulcrum around which all worlds turn.
- The planar chapter of the Harmonium relocated to the plane of Arcadia. They have become less of a police force and more of a diplomatic body. The Harmonium now believes that the best way to spread order is to peacefully unite the Upper Planes under the banner of law rather than forced conversion to their ideals.
- The Fated suffered a great loss of face because it was their factol, Duke Darkwood, who started the Faction War in the first place. They've moved their base of operations to Ysgard, but have otherwise changed little in their methods.
- The Revolutionary League retreated to the plane of Carceri, where most of its cells fell into disarray. Most of the remaining Anarchists seek to return to Sigil in force to become its new rulers. Other members of the League are appalled at the thought of ruling anything and have formed a splinter group, the Second Wave; these "Wavers" take the dissolution of the factions as proof that any political structure can fall and have spread to numerous planar metropolises to stir up rebellion.

== Reviews ==
- Envoyer (German) (Issue 27 - Jan 1999)
