= Planar Handbook =

Dungeons & Dragons rulebook

- Authors: Bruce R. Cordell, Gwendolyn F.M. Kestrel
- Genre: Role-playing game
- Publisher: Wizards of the Coast
- Publication date: July 2004
- Media type: Print (Hardback)
- Pages: 192
- ISBN: 0-7869-3429-8
- OCLC: 56338980
- LC Class: GV1469.62.D84 D836 2000

Planar Handbook is an optional supplemental source book for the 3.5 edition of the Dungeons & Dragons fantasy roleplaying game.

== Contents ==
It contains updates for the 3.5 edition of the fictional Dungeons & Dragons universe for some material from the Planescape campaign setting, along with new races, equipment, spells and feats for characters adventuring on the Planes.

Several new character races were outlined, including the aasimars, bariaurs, buommans, mephlings, neraphim, shadowswyfts, spikers, tieflings, and wildren.

== Publication history ==
The Planar Handbook was written by Bruce R. Cordell and Gwendolyn F.M. Kestrel, and was published in July 2004. Cover art was by Matt Cavotta, with interior art by Brent Chumley, Emily Fiegenschuh, David Hudnut, Dana Knutson, Doug Kovacs, David Martin, Dennis Crabapple-Martin, James Pavelec, Steve Prescott, Vinod Rams, and David Roach.

Bruce Cordell admitted that "the Planar Handbook is ambitiously titled, which means we had to be selective in covering only those things we believed would be most useful to plane-venturing players. Essentially, after a few concept meetings involving the designers, as well as other Wizards staff members, the lead designer for the project (me) put together an outline of topics and divvied up the work among all the assigned designers."

== Reviews ==
- SF Site
- Dragão Brasil
