= Doors to the Unknown =

- Cover
- Genre: Role-playing games
- Publisher: TSR
- Media type: Boxed set

Doors to the Unknown is an accessory for the 2nd edition of the Advanced Dungeons & Dragons fantasy role-playing game.

== Contents ==
Doors to the Unknown is a short adventure campaign involving four 'blink portals' which appear in Sigil every 500 years and disappear again after two months. The player characters would need to explore these portals and discover their secrets, which may involve restricted planes inhabited by powerful hyper-real monsters, and origins with the death of the god Aoskar by the Lady of Pain.

== Publication history ==
Doors to the Unknown was published by TSR, Inc. in 1996.

== Reception ==
Trenton Webb reviewed Doors to the Unknown for Arcane magazine, rating it a 6 out of 10 overall. He commented: "In the early '70s there was a spate of low-budget multi-story horror films where four people were thrown together to tell their tales in turn. Doors to the Unknown borrows this format and suffers from the nagging suspicion - the creators had loads of good ideas but no great ones." He stated: "The challenges are classic Planescape: find the keys to the portals, dive through, do a deed and get back. An extra gulp factor is added with the fact that these portals kill non-key holders, and that after exactly two months they close for another 500 years - so if you're not back by then it's game over." Webb continued: "Each of the portals leads to a unique mini-plane that poses specific challenges, three of which are good fun. The universe's junkyard, a hyperreal jungle and future-world of Logicus Prime all provide very different takes on 'standard weird planes'. Even the dull cave crawl that forms the fourth plane is spiced up considerably with a healthy dose of backstabbing intrigue." He added: "The overall plot that is supposed to fuel the whole campaign doesn't really have the narrative cohesion that's required, though. Players who are going to have other things on their mind - such as getting back home - aren't given enough clues or guidance." Webb concluded his review by saying, "The vagaries of Planescape are one of its true blessings, because it enables games to be played in a fast 'n loose style, which is why it's imperative that recognisable core themes are maintained, and why Doors to the Unknown fails. It serves up four mini-adventures which fail to coalesce into the single great adventure it wants to be."
