= Uncaged: Faces of Sigil =

- Genre: Role-playing games
- Publisher: TSR
- Publication date: 1996

Uncaged: Faces of Sigil is an accessory for the 2nd edition of the Advanced Dungeons & Dragons fantasy role-playing game, published in 1996.

== Contents ==
Uncaged: Faces of Sigil is a collection of non-player characters for the AD&D Planescape setting. The book details 41 characters and 15 briefly described NPCs intended for any Planescape campaign. The game statistics for each of the characters are included at the end of each description, and the descriptions of each character are presented in various forms such as simple reporting of information, or as interviews with the subject, or as over-the-top self introductions.

== Publication history ==
Uncaged: Faces of Sigil was published by TSR, Inc. in 1996.

== Reception ==
Trenton Webb reviewed Uncaged: Faces of Sigil for Arcane magazine, rating it a 9 out of 10 overall. According to Webb, Uncaged fleshes out the circular city's streets with a cast of heroes, villains and eccentrics. This isn't just another collection of one-dimensional stereotypes, though. Each and every one of these unique characters is described in such detail that they fight to get off the page and into your game." He continues: "Neither do these character exist in a vacuum. All are subtly intertwined, so that meeting one leads to another, which leads to another, until players are in a world of trouble they didn't deserve but have to deal with. Which is exactly what life in Sigil should be - a swirl of plots, factions and sedition that leaves players' heads spinning, wounds bleeding and experience points tally in overdrive." He notes that the game statistics are "where they belong", at the end of each description, as "what's most important, are the rich descriptions of each 'person'" ... These make enjoyable reading, as the overall scheme slowly takes shape". He comments further: "The potential for great roleplaying offered by this book is impressive. Despite its chaotic appearance, information and enthusiasm are neatly balanced, which allows you to learn details about a character's background and history, and get a feel for the way they should be played. So when a player's improvisation takes an encounter beyond the text, the NPC's personality and powers are so well outlined it's obvious how they'll react." Webb concluded the review by saying that the characters described in the book "can supply the vital keys, funds and launch-pads for adventures beyond Sigil. This menagerie of the truly odd really flesh out Sigil, transforming it from a place where campaigns start to a place where people live. Planescape states that you need to find a portal key to get out of the Sigil. Uncaged is the key referees need to get into the place and to get at the heart of this most colourful city."

== Reviews ==
- Dragon #234
- Casus Belli #96
- Australian Realms #28
