= Planescape: Adventures in the Multiverse =

5th Edition Dungeons and Dragons boxed set

- Cover art depicting the ruler of Sigil, the Lady of Pain.
- Rules required: Dungeons & Dragons, 5th edition
- Character levels: 3–10, 17
- Campaign setting: Planescape
- First published: October 17, 2023
- ISBN: 9780786969043

Planescape: Adventures in the Multiverse is a boxed set for the 5th edition of the Dungeons & Dragons fantasy role-playing game. The boxed set includes three sourcebooks: Sigil and the Outlands (a Planescape campaign setting guide), Morte's Planar Parade (a bestiary of planar creatures), and Turn of Fortune's Wheel (an adventure module). The books were published together with a Dungeon Masters Screen by Wizards of the Coast.

== Reception ==
A review for Comic Book Resources praised the detail of the setting and the surprising mechanic around character death in the adventure. However, it remarked that the character options were not useful outside the Planescape setting. The review described Planescape: Adventures in the Multiverse as the first book in the 5th edition of Dungeons & Dragons to detail alignment.

A review for Wargamer praised the quality and presentation of the setting's content but criticized the lack of detail due to limited space in the boxed set and that player options were not appealing beyond the campaign setting.
