= Planes of Conflict =

Tabletop role-playing game supplement

- Genre: Role-playing games
- Publisher: TSR
- Publication date: 1995
- Media type: Boxed set

Planes of Conflict is an accessory for the second edition of the Advanced Dungeons & Dragons fantasy role-playing game, published in 1995.

== Contents ==
Planes of Conflict contains six maps and five manuals for use with the Planescape setting. The set details the Beastlands, Bytopia, Elysium, Carceri, Gehenna, and the Gray Waste. These planes serve as checks and balances to keep the other outer planes of the Great Wheel in their place, despite efforts by Law and Chaos to swing the balance of the multiverse favorably by controlling these planes. Each of these planes drains the lawful and chaotic tendencies from characters who spend time on them, each plane bending characters to its own form of neutrality. This set examines the nature, inhabitants, and environments of these six planes using the quotes, illustrations, and slang common to the Planescape style, presenting information as a blend of gossip, observation, and conjecture. The manual for the Dungeon Master provides a concise foundation to build a campaign on while leaving freedom to allow the Dungeon Master to work creatively. The set includes four quick-start adventures that explore the nature of these planes.

== Publication history ==
Planes of Conflict was designed by Dale Donovan, Colin McComb, and Monte Cook, and was published by TSR in 1995. The box cover artist is Robh Ruppel, the book cover artists are DiTerlizzi and Robh Ruppel, and the interior artist is DiTerlizzi.

== Reception ==
Trenton Webb reviewed Planes of Conflict for Arcane magazine, rating it a 9 out of 10 overall. He felt that each of the planes detailed "express six very different views of extreme neutrality. For while Order and Anarchy cannot gain a foothold here, Good and Evil can. Each force influences three of the neutral planes, but with surprising effects." He found three of the set's quick-start adventures to be "excellent, drawing on the nature of the neutral planes to give the game and the NPCs contained within real power", but he felt that "Militancy Justifies The Means", the remaining adventure, "wibbles on too much about the politics of conflict, but works fine as a standard Planescape outing". As part of the Planescape line, Webb felt that the production standards "continue to shame all other TSR offerings with quality artwork, powerful design and crisp text. Planes of Conflict links perfectly into other Planescape works, and die-hard cutters will instantly want to plunge their parties into all manner of neutral nastiness." He concluded the review by stating that with this expansion pack, "Planescape confirms its position as the premier AD&D world. Its hallmark is a bizarre juxtaposition of legend and nightmare. As such, Planes of Conflict is an excellent, almost psychotic example of the twisted logic that makes the multiverse fun to roam."

== Reviews ==
- Dragon #229
