= Sigil (Dungeons & Dragons) =

Fictional city in Dungeons & Dragons

- A view of the Spire and Sigil from the Outlands as portrayed in the Planescape Campaign Setting. Art by Tony DiTerlizzi.
- First appearance: Planescape Campaign Setting (1994)
- Created by: David "Zeb" Cook
- Genre: Role-playing game

In-universe information
- Other names: The City of Doors; The Cage
- Type: City
- Ruled by: Lady of Pain
- Location: Outlands
- Locations: The Lady's Ward; The Lower Ward; The Market Ward; The Guildhall Ward; The Clerk's Ward; The Hive

Sigil (/ˈsɪɡɪl/ SIG-il), also known as the City of Doors and the Cage, is a fictional city in the Dungeons & Dragons fantasy role-playing game and the central urban setting of the Planescape campaign setting. Created by David "Zeb" Cook and introduced in the 1994 Planescape Campaign Setting, Sigil was conceived as a home base from which player characters could travel throughout the setting's multiverse by means of interplanar portals. The city is governed by the enigmatic Lady of Pain, whose image became the principal visual emblem of the original Planescape product line.

Sigil is also the principal setting of the 1999 video game Planescape: Torment. Critics have discussed the city as both a distinctive fantasy setting and a narrative device, particularly its mixture of inhabitants, portal-based geography, philosophical factions and treatment of belief as a force capable of shaping reality.

== Concept and development ==
Sigil was originally created for Planescape as the setting's "home base". According to Steve Winter in 30 Years of Adventure: A Celebration of Dungeons & Dragons, "a movable base, like a vessel of some sort (or an artifact, which was the original idea for the means of traversing the planes) wouldn't do it. It had to be a place that characters could come home to when they needed to, and it had to be central to the nature of the setting". Sigil's factions were created because "Vampire: The Masquerade was a particularly hot game at [the] time and one of the ideas in it that we really liked was the clans. Jim Ward wanted to be sure that players had something to identify with and to give them a sense of belonging in this alien venue [Sigil]".

The ruler of Sigil, the Lady of Pain, became the principal visual emblem of the Planescape setting. Artist Dana Knutson produced the character's original design, which originated as a doodle, during the early concept work for Planescape. Designer David "Zeb" Cook later recalled that the design captured the intended appearance of the setting so effectively that the development team adopted her face as its logo. For the fifth-edition revival of Planescape, illustrator Tony DiTerlizzi said that he combined the character's original 1990s appearance with her later redesign, seeking to retain the setting's established visual identity while updating it for the new edition. DiTerlizzi separately described the Lady as an obvious character to include in his artwork for the revived setting because of her close association with the Planescape setting.

== Characteristics ==
The main setting [in Planescape], a city "at the center of the multiverse" called Sigil, was run by groups called factions. The factions each had a different outlook on the universe. Thus, by joining one of the factions, or simply by dealing with them as players, you were compelled to think and sometimes even argue about the nature of reality.

— Monte Cook

Sigil is depicted as a ring-shaped city situated above the Spire in the Outlands, with its districts occupying the inner surface of the ring. The city has no conventional roads leading into or out of it; travel occurs through portals which can appear in bounded openings such as doors, arches and windows. Each portal requires a particular key or condition and may connect Sigil with another part of the city or with another plane.

The city is governed by the Lady of Pain, a silent and enigmatic being who prevents deities from entering and maintains Sigil as comparatively neutral territory. Although she does not ordinarily administer the city's daily government, she maintains its independence and exercises authority over its portals. Deities are prevented from entering Sigil, allowing the city to remain neutral territory between otherwise hostile planar powers. The Lady communicates indirectly, principally through the dabus, who maintain the city and convey her rare pronouncements. She forbids worship of herself and responds violently to threats against her authority or Sigil. Punishments attributed to her include flaying offenders with the edges of her shadow and confining them within extradimensional prisons known as the Mazes. Published descriptions deliberately leave the Lady's origin, nature and motives unresolved. Rather than providing a definitive history, the setting presents competing rumours about her relationship with Sigil and the source of her powers. Rob Bricken of Kotaku identified the Lady of Pain as one of "The 13 Strangest Deities In Dungeons & Dragons", commenting: "So technically, no one really knows if this immensely powerful entity from the D&D's Planescape setting is a god or not. That's because any time someone tries to worship her, she kills them in the most painful way possible. However, she's definitely immortal, giant, and if her shadow so much as falls on you, you will die in incredible agony."

In the original campaign setting, much of the city's political and civic life was controlled by fifteen philosophical factions, each advancing a different explanation of the nature of reality.

== Publication history ==
=== Advanced Dungeons & Dragons 2nd edition (1989–1999) ===
Sigil is first described in the Planescape Campaign Setting boxed set, released in 1994. It is also featured prominently in some later Planescape rulebooks, including In the Cage: A Guide to Sigil (1995), The Factol's Manifesto (1995), and Uncaged: Faces of Sigil (1996), as well as in many adventures, such as The Eternal Boundary (1994), Harbinger House (1995), and Faction War (1998).

=== Dungeons & Dragons 3.5 edition (2003–2008) ===
A short description of Sigil appears in this edition's Dungeon Master's Guide (2003). Information on Sigil can also be found in various 3.0 and 3.5 sourcebooks, such as the Manual of the Planes and the Planar Handbook. A small reference to Sigil also appears in the Epic Level Handbook aside other planar metropolis such as Tu'narath.

=== Dungeons & Dragons 4th edition (2008–2014) ===
Sigil is described in the 4th edition Manual of the Planes and expanded upon in Dungeon Master's Guide 2. The City of Doors, unlike many planes, remains almost completely unchanged from earlier editions.

=== Dungeons & Dragons 5th edition (2014–) ===
Sigil is briefly mentioned in Appendix C of the 5th edition's Player's Handbook. There is also some information on Sigil in Dungeon Master's Guide at the end of Chapter 2.

A three-volume boxed set, Planescape: Adventures in the Multiverse, was released in October 2023. Its setting book, Sigil and the Outlands, reintroduced the city and its factions for the fifth edition, while the accompanying adventure Turn of Fortune's Wheel begins in Sigil and uses it as a base for travel through the Outlands and other planes.

== In other media ==
Sigil is also the setting for the 1999 video game Planescape: Torment, in which the player is "the Nameless One". The team chose to place the game around a central fixture of Planescape, the city of Sigil, and the game begins with the character waking up on a cold stone slab in the Mortuary of Sigil, with no idea of who he is, what he is doing there or how he died. In an interview with RPGWatch, Chris Avellone commented on the use of Sigil as the game's main setting: "We felt Sigil was the part of Planescape we really had to get right from the outset in case we made more games. It's the signature city, but... we did sacrifice other planar locations so that we could do it".

== Reception ==
Contemporary reviewers generally regarded Sigil as an imaginative but demanding campaign setting. Scott Haring of Pyramid highlighted its function as a city connected to every plane and populated by inhabitants from across those realities. Trenton Webb of Arcane described Sigil as an effective and unusual gaming construct, but argued that it could feel hollow unless the dungeon master filled it with political conflict among its factions. The authors of Art & Arcana: A Visual History later wrote that depictions of Sigil and the Lady of Pain became enduring parts of the visual identity of Dungeons & Dragons.

Sigil's adaptation in Planescape: Torment also received critical attention. Isaac Perry of Game Informer contrasted it with conventional high-fantasy settings, praising its heterogeneous population, portals and philosophical factions. Perry argued that the city operates as an agent within the narrative because its competing belief systems externalize conflicts faced by the player. Perry considered the adaptation successful because it translated the established tabletop setting into a visually distinctive environment without reducing Sigil to a backdrop. He particularly highlighted the way its factions embody conflicting beliefs and allow the city itself to participate in the game's central philosophical concerns. Game scholar Diane Carr analysed the city's unpredictable portals, grotesque inhabitants and connected but episodic locations as part of the game's emphasis on exploration, memory and repeated diversion from a straightforward heroic quest. She connected the game's portal-linked environments and numerous cyclical detours with an experience structured around exploration and reflection rather than a direct progression toward narrative resolution.

Sigil as depicted in Planescape: Torment was praised by Evan Narcisse from Kotaku as one of the richest science fiction and fantasy worlds in video games. Ari David, for CBR, commented that "Sigil is the ultimate inter-dimensional trading post, offering goods and transport not only to other planes but allows passage between the multitude of Material Planes that comprise D&D's campaign settings". Daniel Colohan, also for CBR, included Sigil in the "15 D&D Outer Planes That Would Make Great Campaign Settings" list — Colohan highlights that "the most notable location in the Outlands is Sigil, the City of Doors. [...] The city of Sigil would be the ideal starting location for a campaign centered around the Outer Planes, as portals between each of the planes are commonplace. It could also provide a resting point between adventures, allowing the party to catch their breath between forays into D&D's dangerous outer planes".

Shannon Appelcline, author of Designers & Dragons, commented that while Sigil "had been largely ignored during the 3e era", it "was faring better in 4e, despite the large-scale restructuring of D&D's cosmology" due to small inclusions in the Dungeon Master's Guide (2008) and Manual of the Planes. Appelcline highlighted that it was the 4th Edition Dungeon Master's Guide 2 which "saw the return of the fan-favorite setting of Sigil" which "was laid out as a full paragon-level setting. There's not much new here for old-time fans of Planescape, but there was one big change as a result of Faction War (1998). The factions that caused much of the conflict in Planescape are now gone. [...] The Dungeon Master's Guide 2 also contains 'A Conspiracy of Doors', the first Sigil adventure to see print in many years".

Reviews of Sigil's fifth-edition revival remained positive about the underlying setting but criticised its treatment in Planescape: Adventures in the Multiverse. Joel Franey of GamesRadar+ considered Sigil one of the game's most compelling settings, but found Sigil and the Outlands selective and insufficiently detailed, particularly in its explanations and symbolic maps. Mollie Russell of Wargamer likewise argued that the boxed-set format forced the setting to favour breadth over depth and gave insufficient space to Sigil's factions. Russell also observed that the fifth-edition version softened the grim tone and philosophical conflict that had characterised the original depiction of the city.

== See also ==
- Multiverse
- Cynosure, a pan-dimensional city from the GrimJack comics
- M'Kraan Crystal, a nexus of realities in the Marvel Universe
