= Planescape Campaign Setting =

1994 tabletop role-playing game supplement

- Author: David "Zeb" Cook
- Genre: Role-playing game
- Publisher: TSR
- Publication date: 1994
- Media type: Boxed set

The Planescape Campaign Setting is a boxed set for the Dungeons & Dragons fantasy role-playing game. The set was designed by David "Zeb" Cook and published in 1994. It introduced the Planescape setting and was highly praised by White Wolf and Pyramid magazines.

== Contents ==
The Planescape Campaign Setting boxed set details the planes of the Dungeons & Dragons game, which had been previously featured in books such as Deities and Demigods and the Manual of the Planes. The set contains a Player and a DM Guide, a Monstrous Supplement, a guide exploring the city of Sigil and the plane of the Outlands, four color maps, and a DM screen. The set first describes the Inner Planes of Air, Earth, Fire, and Water, the Paraelemental and Quasimental Planes, and the Positive and Negative Material Planes, with the physical and special magical conditions, and hazards native to each plane. The set also details the Outer Planes, with their layers and the realms found on each layer, with descriptions for notable layers and realms and which gods (or "Powers") live there. Also described with the Outer Planes are the four unique planar paths—the rivers Oceanus and Styx, the tree Yggdrasil, and Mount Olympus—that characters can use to travel to the many layers on different Outer Planes that they reach. The largest guide in the set describes the Outlands, which provides connections to all the other Outer Planes via corresponding towns. Sigil, the City of Doors, located high above the Outlands, is run by different factions, and which contains portals that connect to every plane and layer. The ruler of Sigil is the mysterious Lady of Pain, who makes an appearance during times of turmoil from within or without the city.

With the rules governing inter-planar travel, characters can move from plane to plane via portals, elemental vortices, and astral conduits. A vortex works like a doorway; a conduit is nothing more than a tunnel. Depending upon the parameters of the campaign, players may choose from the standard AD&D game archetypes, including humans, dwarves, and halflings, or opt for planar races, such as bariaur, githzerai, and tieflings. A player also may assign his PC to one of the character factions, which derive from philosophies and alignments, and most factions accept every class. Wizard and priest spells are affected in different ways based on the caster's location.

The multiverse consists of three divisions. The first division, the Prime Material Plane, includes the worlds associated with the Dragonlance, Ravenloft, and Forgotten Realms settings. The second division is made up of the six Inner Planes, which correspond to the six elemental building blocks of the Prime Material Plane: Fire, Air, Earth, Water, Positive Energy, and Negative Energy. The Paraelemental Planes, subdivisions of the Inner Planes, appear where the Elemental Planes merge with one another. The Quasielemental Planes, another set of Inner Planes, arise along the borders of the Positive and Negative Planes. The third division is the Outer Planes, which take the form of broad rings, infinite in number and size. The three groups of Outer Planes are attuned to specific alignments: the Upper Planes of Good, the boundary Planes of Neutrality, and the Lower Planes of Evil.

Sigil is centered in the Outlands, a stable area also known as Concordant Opposition, and contains doorways leading to every locale in the multiverse. As described in the 96-page "Sigil and Beyond" book, it resembles a medieval city "built on the inside of a tire that hovers over the top of a gods-know-how-tall spike, which rises from a universe shaped like a giant pancake." Visitors can arrange for sedan chairs to carry them around, while Light Boys brighten the way with continual light wands. Overseeing the realm is the Lady of Pain, a mysterious being. The "DM Guide" contains a listing of noteworthy locations from the Inner and Outer Planes.

== Publication history ==
The Planescape Campaign Setting was designed by David "Zeb" Cook. It was published by TSR as a boxed set and consisted of one 96-page book, one 64-page book, two 32-page books, four 32" x 21" double-sided map sheets, and one four-panel referee screen. Editing was by David Wise, the conceptual artist was Dana Knutson, illustrations were by Tony DiTerlizzi, graphic design was by Dee Barnett and Dawn Murin, and the cover was by Robh Ruppel.

== Reception ==
Planescape Campaign Setting won the Origins Award for Best Graphic Presentation of a Roleplaying Game, Adventure, or Supplement of 1994.

Gene Alloway reviewed the boxed set for White Wolf magazine, saying, "Cook and company have created a cohesive and comprehensive campaign for every AD&Der who wants to venture beyond the Prime Material - and there's a lot of venturing to do." According to Alloway, the set brought together adventure, gods, philosophies, and magic in an exciting manner, and presented a setting that would work well with any AD&D campaign or on its own, and that it gave readers a solid sense of each plane, as well as an idea of the overall qualities common to all. He said that Planescape "is a superb addition to the AD&D multiverse [...] it's clear that a great deal of thought and effort has gone into this product. The writing is clear, most topics are covered in detail and adventure ideas are either presented directly or dropped in as 'seeds' for you to pick up on." Alloway praised Cook's efforts to make the planes accessible and enjoyable for lower-level characters, and for developing an important part of the AD&D multiverse, and he appreciated the setting's emphasis on roleplaying and critical thinking rather than moving and hacking. Alloway considered Planescape the best AD&D setting since Greyhawk, with no end to its possibilities, and concluded the review by saying "The Planescape campaign setting is enough to make me put down my other game systems and AD&D settings to reawaken the wonder I felt when I started roleplaying."

Scott Haring reviewed the Planescape Campaign Setting for Pyramid #8 (July/August 1994). Haring began the review by saying, "Normally, I start a review off slowly [...] Forget that noise. I'll cut to the chase — Planescape is the finest game world ever produced for Advanced Dungeons & Dragons. Period." He describes the setting as "adult" in the sense that it is about more than just "kick open the door, kill the monster, take the treasure, repeat", with its "sophisticated graphic look" and the "sense that it makes you think, and might even challenge your most basic ideas about life, the universe, and everything." He thought that what makes this work is the setting's focus on factions and their ideologies. Haring was also quite impressed with Cook's conversational writing style, calling it "wonderful" and stating that Cook "is an old hand at the ways of the planes", and that using the book's slang would "enhance an already rich roleplaying experience". He complimented the set's distinctive graphic looks, from "the weathered-metal texture of the book covers to the bizarre headline typeface to the odd squiggles of brown and blue that are on nearly every page". He commented that Tony DiTerlizzi's drawings reminded him a little of Dr. Seuss "if he did highly-detailed dark fantasy". He finished the review by stating that "Planescape is a revolutionary product, a breakthrough for TSR. If you think you've 'graduated' from AD&D, that you've evolved past it, go back and take a look at Planescape. This is the game world that will get you playing AD&D again."

Rick Swan reviewed the Planescape Campaign Setting for Dragon magazine #207 (July 1994). He declared that the original Manual of the Planes "stands among the best role-playing supplements of the 1980s" but "never really caught fire", speculating lack of interest, uncertainty by game designers of how to further support it, or confused players; Swan said that the book had in a sense been "reincarnated as the Planescape setting, a spectacular boxed set and TSR's most ambitious campaign world to date. Abandoning the straightforward but dry approach of the Manual, the Planescape set reads less like a textbook and more like a story. Characters take precedence over game systems, high adventure supplants the physics lessons. It's designer Zeb Cook's finest effort since 1985's Oriental Adventures and may be his masterwork." He declared that the graphics and language were "dramatically different from typical TSR fare. The five books boast color throughout, with generous space devoted to Tony DiTerlizzi's provocative illustrations. Streamers of what look like paraelemental toilet paper break paragraphs into jagged chunks. The quirky typeface [...] gives the text an unworldly feel. Oversized quotations sprinkled throughout the chapters [...] inform as well as entertain. Though the maps make better posters than play-aids—with its clusters of boxy buildings scattered across a barren plane, the map of Sigil looks like a lunar ant farm — they're attractive and well rendered. The referee's screen, however, seems superfluous, as many of its tables are lifted from the DMG and PH. Thanks to Cook's informal prose, this goes down much easier than the Manual of the Planes." Swan went on to note that "Cook seasons his writing with liberal doses of slang based on the lingo of thieves and swindlers from the 16th-18th centuries", but notes that while "the slang gives the game a unique voice, it also can be awkward, even jarring". He praised Cook for "resisting the temptation to explain the physical laws of the planes in ponderous detail. Why do the planes assume such unusual shapes? Well, they just do. Why are some planes made of fire, some of ice? Well, they just are." Swan also felt that "Cook insists that the mechanics serve the story, not vice versa, making this an extremely user-friendly multiverse." Commenting on the set's geography, Swan said "With energetic, vividly imagined descriptions, Cook captures the magnitude of the multiverse and the diversity of its inhabitants. That's quite an accomplishment, considering that the multiverse encompasses all of TSR's campaign settings, past, present, and future." He commented that the "Monstrous Supplement" booklet "presents an assortment of extraordinarily bizarre creatures". He called "The Rules of Threes" the "most compelling" of the setting's innovations: "it's a design philosophy that characterizes every element of the game as one third of a whole. Or, as Cook elegantly explains, "Good things come in threes . . . so do bad things." Traditional AD&D game campaigns can be considered as sets of opposites: good and evil, night and day, up and down. The Planescape setting adds the intermediary: good, evil, and neutrality; night, day, and twilight; up, down, and sideways. If that sounds vague . . . well, it is. As presented, "The Rule of Threes" is just a guideline, a general principle to be explored and developed in supplements to come.

In 2013, Alex Lucard, for Diehard GameFAN, highlighted the Planescape Campaign Setting on a list of 2nd Edition products he would want rereleased on DNDClassics. He commented that "without the core campaign settings, DMs will either have to fill in the blanks, adjust adventures to a more generic setting or homebrew world, or they’ll just have to track down physical copies of the boxed sets, which can be both hard and expensive. [...] Having the Planescape Campaign Setting would allow newcomers to truly see just why Planescape has the crazy zealous cult following it does, both in the tabletop and video game worlds. Hell, the site could make a lot of money from selling the contents a la carte or as a bundle, because the boxed set contained a Player’s Guide, a DM Guide, a Monstrous Supplement, various maps, a DM Screen and more! [...] If Wizards wants to print money, then this is probably the best way to do it using Second Edition".

== Reviews ==
- Backstab #5
- Dragão Brasil #3 (1994) (Portuguese)
- Dosdediez (Número 5 - Jul/Ago 1994)
- Rollespilsmagasinet Fønix (Danish) (Issue 2 - May/June 1994)
- Australian Realms #18
