= List of Forgotten Realms modules and sourcebooks =

Forgotten Realms modules and sourcebooks are modules (adventures) and sourcebooks (campaign setting information) printed for the Forgotten Realms campaign setting in the Dungeons & Dragons fantasy role-playing game.

== Modules ==
=== 1st edition adventures ===
Title	Author	Date	Subject	Pages	Item #	Levels	ISBN
DQ—Modules also compatible with DragonQuest rules.
The Shattered Statue	Jennell Jaquays	February 1988	-	53	DQ1	-	0-88038-498-0
FRC—Forgotten Realms Companion (or Computer) are modules related to SSI computer games and form a linked sequence.
Ruins of Adventure	Mike Breault, David Cook, Jim Ward, Steve Winter	August 1988	Based on Pool of Radiance. Connected Short Adventures.	96	FRC1	Any	0-88038-588-X
Curse of the Azure Bonds	Jeff Grubb, George MacDonald	April 1989	Based on novel; tie-in to game.	96	FRC2	6–9	0-88038-606-1
H—The Bloodstone Pass Saga is a linked campaign series that focuses on using Battlesystem battles in Forgotten Realms AD&D adventures.
Bloodstone Pass	Douglas Niles, Michael Dobson	August 1985	Battlesystem required.	64	H1	13–17	0-394-54856-6
The Mines of Bloodstone	Michael Dobson, Douglas Niles	January 1, 1987	Battlesystem recommended.	32	H2	16–18	0-88038-312-7
The Bloodstone Wars	Michael Dobson, Douglas Niles	July 1, 1987	Battlesystem recommended.	32	H3	17–20	0-88038-398-4
The Throne of Bloodstone	Douglas Niles, Michael Dobson	May 1, 1988	Battlesystem optional.	32	H4	18–100	0-88038-560-X
I—Intermediate
Desert of Desolation	Tracy & Laura Hickman, Philip Meyers, Peter Rice, William John Wheeler	1987	Collection of 3 Forgotten Realms adventure modules.	128	I3-I5	-	0-88038-397-6
Swords of the Iron Legion	Bill Connors, Christopher Mortika, Rick Reid, Scott Bennie, John Terra, Jay Batista, Roy Schelper, Rick Swan	1988	Collection of 11 short Forgotten Realms adventure scenarios, including some designed for Battlesystem.	64	I14	-	0-88038-559-6
N—Novice
Treasure Hunt	Aaron Allston	1986	FR module (retroactive).	36	N4	0–1	0-88038-326-7
Under Illefarn	Steve Perrin	1987	First labelled FR module.	48	N5	0–3	0-88038-489-1
OA—Oriental Adventures was originally its own campaign setting, but the setting has been incorporated into Forgotten Realms.
Swords of the Daimyo	David Cook	March 1986	―	68	OA1	6–10	0-88038-273-2
Night of the Seven Swords	Jon Pickens, David Cook, Harold Johnson, Rick Swan, Ed Carmien, and David James Ritchie	December 1986	―	52	OA2	6–8	0-88038-327-5
Ochimo: The Spirit Warrior	Jeff Grubb and David Cook	May 1987	―	48	OA3	5–7	0-88038-393-3
Blood of the Yakuza	David Cook	August 1987	―	76	OA4	―	0-88038-401-8
Mad Monkey vs. the Dragon Claw	Jeff Grubb	January 1989	First OA adventure with Forgotten Realms branding.	56	OA5	6–9	0-88038-624-X

=== 2nd edition adventures ===
Title	Author	Date	Subject	Pages	Series #	Levels	ISBN
FA—Forgotten Realms Adventures are stand-alone 2nd Ed. AD&D modules set in Forgotten Realms.
Halls of the High King	Ed Greenwood	1990	―	64	FA1	6-10	0-88038-881-1
Nightmare Keep	Rick Swan	1991	―	64	FA2	18–20	1-5607-6147-4
FM—Forgotten Realms Maztica are stand-alone 2nd Ed. AD&D modules set in Maztica.
Fires of Zatal	Jeff Grubb, Tim Beach	1991	―	64	FMA1	1–3	1-5607-6139-3
Endless Armies	Jeff Grubb	1991	―	32	FMA2	4–6	1-5607-6146-6
City of Gold	John Nephew, Jonathan Tweet	1992	―	210	FMQ1	4–6	1-5607-6322-1
FRA—Forgotten Realms Adventure, or the Empires Adventures Trilogy, is a series of modules for use with The Horde expansion campaign for 2nd Ed. AD&D Forgotten Realms.
Storm Riders	Troy Denning	1990	―	64	FRA1	5–7	0-88038-834-X
Black Courser	Troy Denning	1990	―	64	FRA2	6–9	0-88038-858-7
Blood Charge	Troy Denning	1990	―	64	FRA3	7–10	0-88038-889-7
FRE—Forgotten Realms Epic are modules loosely based on the Avatar Trilogy of Forgotten Realms novels.
Shadowdale	Ed Greenwood	1989	―	52	FRE1	5–8	0-88038-720-3
Tantras	Ed Greenwood	1989	―	48	FRE2	6–9	0-88038-748-3
Waterdeep	Ed Greenwood	1989	―	48	FRE3	6–9	0-88038-757-2
FRM—Forgotten Realms Mission
Jungles of Chult	James Lowder, Jean Rabe	1993	―	―	FRM1	5–8	
FRQ—Forgotten Realms Quest are stand-alone modules for 2nd Ed. AD&D set in Forgotten Realms.
Haunted Halls of Eveningstar	Ed Greenwood	1992	―	32	FRQ1	1–5	1-5607-6325-6
Hordes of Dragonspear	William W. Connors	1992	Battlesystem options.	32	FRQ2	10–12	1-56076-333-7
Doom of Daggerdale	Wolfgang Baur	1993	First module for use with revised Forgotten Realms.	32	FRQ3	1–3	1-5607-6654-9
LC—Living City
Gateway to Ravens Bluff	Role Playing Game Association	1989	sourcebook	64	LC1	1-3	
Inside Ravens Bluff	―	1990	sourcebook	64	LC2	N/A	1-5607-6048-6
Nightwatch in the Living City	Walter Baas, Kira Glass	1991	―	32	LC3	1	1-5607-6068-0
Port of Ravens Bluff	Role Playing Game Association	1991	sourcebook, includes 3-D fold-up ship	64	LC4	N/A	1-5607-6120-2
OA—Oriental Adventures was originally its own campaign setting (see Kara-Tur OA series), but from OA5 was incorporated into Forgotten Realms. FROA is Forgotten Realms Oriental Adventures
Ronin Challenge	Curtis Smith, Rick Swan	1989	―	96	OA6	5–8	0-88038-749-1
Test of the Samurai	Rick Swan	1989	Sequel to OA6.	96	OA7	6–9	0-88038-775-0
Ninja Wars	Nigel Findley	1990	―	96	FROA1	6–9	0-88038-895-1
Dungeon Crawl series of stand-alone modules
Undermountain: The Lost Level	Steven Schend	1996	―	32	9519	7–9	0-7869-0399-6
Undermountain: Maddgoth's Castle	Steven Schend	1996	―	32	9528	7–10	0-7869-0423-2
Undermountain: Stardock	Steven Schend	1996	―	32	9538	10–14	0-7869-0451-8
Hellgate Keep	Steven Schend	1998	―	32	9562	9–12	0-7869-0786-X
The Dungeon of Death	Jason Carl	2000	―	32	11622	7–9	0-7869-1622-2
Marco Volo trilogy
Marco Volo: Departure	Anthony Pryor	1994	―	32	9444	6–8	1-5607-6848-7
Marco Volo: Journey	Anthony Pryor	1994	―	32	9450	6–8	1-5607-6869-X
Marco Volo: Arrival	Anthony Pryor	1994	―	32	9455	6–8	1-5607-6890-8
Randal Morn trilogy
The Sword of the Dales	Jim Butler	1995	―	32	9484	1-4	0-7869-0126-8
The Secret of Spiderhaunt	Jim Butler	1995	―	32	9485	1-4	0-7869-0150-0
The Return of Randal Morn	Jim Butler	1995	―	32	9488	1-4	0-7869-0170-5
Castle Spulzeer story
Castle Spulzeer	Doug Stewart	1997	Set in the Forgotten Realms and concludes in the Ravenloft adventure The Forgotten Terror.	64	9544	8–12	0-7869-0669-3
The Forgotten Terror	William W. Connors	1997	Uses the Ravenloft setting and may be played as a stand-alone or as the sequel to the Forgotten Realms adventure Castle Spulzeer.	―	9537	10–12	
Stand-alone modules
The Accursed Tower	R.A. Salvatore	1999	Reviewed in Envoyer magazine #32.	32	11337	1–3	0-7869-1337-1
For Duty and Deity	Dale Donovan	1998	Four adventures that can be played individually or as a series.	64	9574	10–12	0-7869-1234-0
Four from Cormyr	John Terra	1997	―	128	9531	9–12	0-7869-0646-4
How the Mighty Are Fallen	"Slade" Henson	1996	For use with the Netheril: Empire of Magic campaign setting.	66	9540	11–14	0-7869-0537-9
Kidnapped	Tom Prusa	1998	For use with the City of Ravens Bluff sourcebook. Adaptable for any low to high level campaign.	32	9590	Variable	
The Tomb of Damara	Richard Baker, David Cook, Kevin Melka, Bruce Nesmith	1995	Included in the "Introduction to Advanced Dungeons & Dragons" boxed set.	-	-	-	-
Wyrmskull Throne	Steven Schend and Thomas M. Reid	1999	―	60	11405	4–7	0-7869-1405-X

=== 3rd edition adventures ===
Title	Author	Date	Subject	Pages	Levels	Item #	ISBN
Into the Dragon's Lair	Sean K. Reynolds & Steve Miller	October 1, 2000	―	96	10	TSR11634	978-0-7869-1634-4
Pool of Radiance: Attack on Myth Drannor	Sean K. Reynolds and Shawn F. Carnes	November 1, 2000	Tie-in with the video game Pool of Radiance: Ruins of Myth Drannor.	128	6	TSR11710	978-0-7869-1710-5
City of the Spider Queen	James Wyatt	September 1, 2002	Ranked 24th greatest adventure of all time.	160	10–18	―	978-0-7869-2874-3
Sons of Gruumsh	Christopher Perkins	September 15, 2005	―	32	4–6	884467400	978-0-7869-3698-4
The Twilight Tomb	Greg A. Vaughan	September 12, 2006	―	32	3–4	953947400	978-0-7869-3947-3
Expedition to Undermountain	Eric L. Boyd, Ed Greenwood, Christopher Lindsay, & Sean K. Reynolds	June 19, 2007	―	224	1–10	957327200	978-0-7869-4157-5
Fall of Frostsilver	Matthew Sernett	November, 2007	―	11	-	-	-
Shar trilogy
Cormyr: The Tearing of the Weave	Richard Baker, Bruce R. Cordell, David Noonan, Matthew Sernett, and James Wyatt	2007	―	160	4–8	956857200	978-0-7869-4119-3
Shadowdale: The Scouring of the Land	Richard Baker, Eric L. Boyd, & Thomas M. Reid	July 17, 2007	―	160	8–13	955697200	978-0-7869-4039-4
Anauroch: The Empire of Shade	Greg A. Vaughan, Thomas M. Reid, & Sean K. Reynolds	November 13, 2007	―	160	13–17	978078694	0-7869-4362-9

=== 4th edition adventures ===
Title	Author	Date	Pages	Levels	Item #	ISBN
Scepter Tower of Spellgard	David Noonan, Greg A. Vaughan	September 16, 2008	96	2–5	217647400	978-0-7869-4954-0
Undermountain: Halaster's Lost Apprentice	Erik Scott de Bie	2010	56	-	-	
Beneath the Lonely Tower	Erik Scott de Bie	March, 2010	16	6	-	
Lost Crown of Neverwinter	Erik Scott de Bie	2011	-	-	-	
The Elder Elemental Eye	Pieter Sleijpen	2012	54	-	-	
Halls of Undermountain	Shawn Merwin, Matt Sernett	April 17, 2012	96	1–5	620-38855000-001 EN	978-0-7869-5994-5
Web of the Spider Queen	Logan Bonner	2012	62	-	-	
Council of Spiders	James Wyatt and Logan Bonner	2012	36	-	-	
Dead in the Eye	Jobe Bittman	June 2012	16	-	-	
War of Everlasting Darkness	Shawn Merwin, Steve Townshend, James Wyatt	August 2012	64	-	-	
Storm Over Neverwinter	Erik Scott de Bie	2013	36	-	-	
Search for the Diamond Staff	Richard Baker	2013	39	-	-	

=== 5th edition adventures ===
Title	Author	Date	Subject	Pages	Levels	ISBN
D&D Next and The Sundering series
Reclaiming Blingdenstone	Robert J. Schwalb, James Wyatt	2012	In the midst of fierce fighting with humanoids, rogue elementals and Underdark monsters, adventurers try to help the deep gnomes restore their lost city to a semblance of what it once was.	40	-	-
Vault of the Dracolich	Teos Abadia, Scott Fitzgerald Gray and Michael E. Shea	June 2013	Deep in the forest of Cormanthor lies the hoard of the dracolich Dretchroyaster, the prize of which is a diamond staff rumored to unlock the secrets of an ancient elven kingdom.	26	-	-
Ghosts of Dragonspear Castle	Christopher Perkins and Jeremy Crawford	August 2013	A group of Red Wizards of Thay have constructed a base that contains a quartet of netherese portals that each lead to powerful elemental nodes.	290	-	978-0-7869-6531-1
Murder in Baldur's Gate	Ed Greenwood, Matt Sernett and Steve Winter	August 2013	Presents Baldur's Gate in the time of the Second Sundering, where the player characters defend the city against an ancient evil long thought slain.	96	-	0786964634
Confrontation at Candlekeep	Teos Abadia, Greg Bilsland, Shawn Merwin	August 2013	A cult of Asmodeus, led by one of his Chosen, assaults Candlekeep after managing to deactivate some of the fortress' wards.	27	-	-
Legacy of the Crystal Shard	R. A. Salvatore, James Wyatt and Jeffrey Ludwig	November 2013	Contains information on the settlements of Ten Towns and their inhabitants, and an adventure in which the player characters defend Icewind Dale against a rising threat with ties to the past.	96	-	0786964642
Scourge of the Sword Coast	Tito Leati, Matt Sernett and Chris Sims	February 2014	A continuation for "Ghosts of Dragonspear Castle". Savage humanoids are raiding the countryside around Daggerford, causing victims of their attacks to seek out the shelter of the town.	85	-	-
Dead in Thay	Scott Fitzgerald Gray	April 2014	Szass Tam, the lich lord of Thay, and his Red Wizards threaten to dominate all of the Sword Coast. The Bloodgate, an elemental node of power, must be destroyed in order to stop him. This adventure is part two of the "Dreams of the Red Wizards" Sundering storyline, directly tied to "Scourge of the Sword Coast", and loosely connected to the events in "Ghosts of Dragonspear Castle".	107	-	-
Tyranny of Dragons series
Hoard of the Dragon Queen	Wizards RPG Team, Kobold Press	August 19, 2014	The Cult of the Dragon, along with its dragon allies and the Red Wizards of Thay, seek to bring Tiamat from her prison in the Nine Hells to Faerun.	96	1-8	978-0-7869-6564-9
The Rise of Tiamat	Wizards RPG Team, Kobold Press	November 4, 2014	This sequel to Hoard of the Dragon Queen, pits players against the 5-headed draconic goddess Tiamat.	96	8-15	978-0-7869-6565-6
Tyranny of Dragons (includes 2 adventures)	Wizards RPG Team, Kobold Press	October 22, 2019	Includes Hoard of the Dragon Queen and The Rise of Tiamat. Rereleased in 2023 with new art (ISBN 978-0-7869-6865-7).	224	1-15	978-0-7869-6697-4
Waterdeep series
Waterdeep: Dragon Heist	Wizards RPG Team	September 18, 2018	An urban-themed treasure hunt for a massive hoard of gold within the city of Waterdeep.	256	1-5	978-0-7869-6625-7
Waterdeep: Dungeon of the Mad Mage	Wizards RPG Team	November 20, 2018	Dungeon crawl in the classic Undermountain lair.	320	5-20	978-0-7869-6626-4
Standalone adventures
Lost Mine of Phandelver	Wizards RPG Team	July 15, 2014	Part of the 2014 Starter Set.	―	1–5	978-0-7869-6559-5
Princes of the Apocalypse	Wizards RPG Team, Sasquatch Game Studios	April 7, 2015	Across the North of Faerûn, four different elemental cults have caused natural disasters. Secretly, the cults have come together to unleash an unknown catastrophic force.	256	1-15	978-0-7869-6578-6
Out of the Abyss	Wizards RPG Team, Green Ronin	September 15, 2015	After escaping capture by Drow Elves with a group of other prisoners, player find that demons have a stronger influence in the Underdark than expected.	256	1-15	978-0-7869-6581-6
Curse of Strahd	Wizards RPG Team	March 15, 2016	Adventurers are mysteriously drawn to the realm of Barovia which is surrounded by deadly fog and ruled by the vampire wizard Strahd von Zarovich.	256	1-10	978-0-7869-6598-4
Storm King's Thunder	Wizards RPG Team	September 6, 2016	Storm King Hekaton is missing, leaving the Giant races to raid the Sword Coast.	256	1-11	978-0-7869-6600-4
Tales from the Yawning Portal	Wizards RPG Team	April 4, 2017	A 5th-edition sourcebook that updates and adapts seven popular dungeons from earlier editions of Dungeons & Dragons.	-	-	0786966092
Tomb of Annihilation	Wizards RPG Team	September 19, 2017	A curse is slowly killing anyone who has ever been raised from the dead. Clues lead to the dinosaur-inhabited ancient jungles of Chult.	256	1-9+	978-0-7869-6610-3
Dragon of Icespire Peak	Wizards RPG Team	June 24, 2019	Part of the Essentials Kit.	―	1–6	978-0-7869-6683-7
Baldur's Gate: Descent into Avernus	Wizards RPG Team	September 17, 2019	The city of Baldur's Gate falls under the influence of evil gods, so adventurers must search for redemption in Avernus, the first layer of the Nine Hells.	256	1-13	978-0-7869-6676-9
Locathah Rising	Chris Lindsay	September 19, 2019	-	24	-	-
Icewind Dale: Rime of the Frostmaiden	Chris Perkins et al.	September 15, 2020	In Icewind Dale, lesser deity Auril the Frostmaiden has plunged the land into everlasting winter.	320	1-12	978-0-7869-6698-1
A Fool's Errand	Scott Fitzgerald Gray, Justin Stocks	2021	Companion adventure for the "Idle Champions of the Forgotten Realms" videogame.	15	-	-
The Trials of Mount Tiamat	Scott Fitzgerald Gray, Chris Dupuis	2021	Companion adventure for the "Idle Champions of the Forgotten Realms" videogame.	28	18-20	-
Candlekeep Mysteries	Wizards RPG Team	March 16, 2021	17 mystery-themed adventures, each tied to a book discovered in the famed library fortress of Candlekeep.	224	-	0786967226
Dragons of Stormwreck Isle	Wizards RPG Team	October 4, 2022	Part of the 2022 Starter Set.	48	1-3	-
Prisoner 13	Wizards RPG Team	February 22, 2023	Part of the anthology "Keys from the Golden Vault".	-	4	-
Phandelver and Below: The Shattered Obelisk	Richard Baker, Eytan Bernstein, Makenzie De Armas, Amanda Hamon, Ron Lundeen, Christopher Perkins	September 19, 2023	The cult of a malevolent entity has set its sights on transforming Phandalin into the capital of its evil empire.	-	-	-
Heroes' Feast: Saving the Children's Menu	Deborah Ann Woll, Jason Tondro, Kate Welch	November 22, 2023	Intended as a companion to "Heroes' Feast Flavors of the Multiverse: An Official D&D Cookbook" and is set in the Forgotten Realms in Daggerford and the Delimbiyr Vale.	-	10	-
Peril in Pinebrook	Shawn Merwin	November 2023	Intended as a companion to "The Practically Complete Guide to Dragons" and is set in the Forgotten Realms around the village of Pinebrook, focusing on silver dragons.	22	10	-
Vecna: Nest of the Eldritch Eye	Christopher Perkins, Makenzie De Armas	April 2024	A sinister cult has crept into the bowels of Neverwinter, and the characters must infiltrate the cult’s hideout and root out its members before harm befalls the city.	-	3	-
Vecna: Eve of Ruin	Amanda Hamon, Makenzie De Armas, Ron Lundeen, Patrick Renie	May 21, 2024	The evil lich-god Vecna has unearthed secrets he can use to unravel and remake the multiverse. The story begins in the Forgotten Realms, and moves to the Planescape, Spelljammer, Eberron, Ravenloft, Dragonlance and Greyhawk settings.	-	-	978-0-7869-6947-0
Boreal Ball	Christopher Perkins, James Wyatt	November 12, 2024	Short sample adventure, included in the "Dungeon Master's Guide 5th edition (revised)" sourcebook.	-	7	-
Hold Back the Dead	Ron Lundeen	February 5, 2025	The lich Szass Tam launchs assaults by armies of undead against cities on the Sword Coast and in the Silver Marches, while the players try to defend Ironspine Keep.	-	-	-

== Supplements ==
=== 1st edition supplements ===
Title	Author	Date	Pages	Series #	ISBN
Forgotten Realms Campaign Set (boxed set)	Ed Greenwood, with Jeff Grubb, and Karen Martin	1987	96	―	0-8803-8472-7
Oriental Adventures	Gary Gygax, David Cook, and François Marcela-Froideval	1985	141	―	0-8803-8099-3
Kara-Tur: The Eastern Realms	Mike Pondsmith, Jay Batista, Rick Swan, John Nephew, Deborah Christian	1988	96	―	0-88038-608-8
City System	Jeff Grubb with Ed Greenwood	1988	130	―	0-88038-600-2
Lords of Darkness	Ed Greenwood, Deborah Christian, Michael Stackpole, Paul Jaquays, Steve Perrin, Vince Garcia, Jean Rabe	1988	96	―	0-88038-622-3
Waterdeep and the North	Ed Greenwood	March 1, 1988	64	FR1	0-88038-490-5
Moonshae	Douglas Niles	December 1987	64	FR2	0-88038-494-8
Empires of the Sands	Scott Haring	March 1, 1988	64	FR3	0-88038-539-1
The Magister	Ed Greenwood and Steve Perrin	June 1988	64	FR4	0-88038-564-2
The Savage Frontier	Jennell Jaquays (Note: Credited as Paul Jaquays.)	September 1988	64	FR5	0-88038-593-6
Dreams of the Red Wizards	Steve Perrin	February 1989	64	FR6	0-88038-615-0

=== 2nd edition supplements ===
FR—Forgotten Realms are sourcebooks describing aspects of Forgotten Realms, rather than traditional modules. FR1–6 are for 1st Ed. AD&D, FR7–16 for 2nd Ed.
FOR-Forgotten Realms Accessories are designed for the Realms universe.
FRS—Forgotten Realms Sourcebook are 2nd Ed. AD&D sourcebooks for use with Forgotten Realms.

Title	Author	Date	Pages	Series #	ISBN
Hall of Heroes	Tactical Strategy Rules	April 1989	210	FR7	0-88038-711-4
Cities of Mystery	Jean Rabe	August 1989	64	FR8	0-88038-744-0
The Bloodstone Lands	R.A. Salvatore	December 1, 1989	64	FR9	0-88038-771-8
Old Empires	Scott Bennie	March 1990	96	FR10	0-88038-821-8
Dwarves Deep	Ed Greenwood	January 1991	210	FR11	0-88038-880-3
The booklet details the various types of dwarves found in the Forgotten Realms. The book itself is printed on parchment-colored paper, and is wrapped in a three-panel removable gatefold cover. The contents include the current situation concerning dwarves in the campaign world. It was published by TSR as product 9300 in 1990.
Horde Campaign	Curtis M. Scott	June 1991	210	FR12	1-56076-130-X
Anauroch	Ed Greenwood	November 1991	96	FR13	1-56076-126-1
The 96 page booklet includes an introduction and detailed descriptions of places and races in the great desert Anauroch. It includes a fold-out poster with a map of the region. Cover art is by Brom and interior art is by Valerie Valusek.
The Great Glacier	Rick Swan	September 1992	210	FR14	1-56076-324-8
Gold & Glory	Tim Beach	December 1992	64	FR15	1-56076-334-5
The Shining South	Tom Prusa	May 1993	96	FR16	1-56076-595-X
Draconomicon	Nigel Findley	1990	128	FOR1	0-88038-876-5
The Drow of the Underdark	Ed Greenwood	1990	128	FOR2	1-56076-132-6
Pirates of the Fallen Stars	Curtis Scott	1992	―	FOR3	1-56076-320-5
The Code of the Harpers	Ed Greenwood	1993	128	FOR4	1-5607-6644-1
Translated into German and reviewed in Envoyer magazine #40.
Elves of Evermeet	Various	1994	128	FOR5	1-5607-6829-0
The Seven Sisters	Ed Greenwood	1995	128	FOR6	0-7869-0118-7
Giantcraft	Ray Winninger	1995	128	FOR7	0-7869-0163-2
Pages from the Mages	Ed Greenwood, Tim Beach	1995	128	FOR8	0-7869-0183-7
Wizards and Rogues of the Realms	William W. Conners	1995	128	FOR9	0-7869-0190-X
Warriors and Priests of the Realms	―	1996	128	FOR10	0-7869-0368-6
Cult of the Dragon	Dale Donovan	1998	128	FOR11	0-7869-0709-6
Translated into German and reviewed in Envoyer magazine #26.
Demihumans of the Realms	Roger E. Moore	1998	96	FOR12	0-7869-1316-9
Secrets of the Magister	Ed Greenwood	2000	128	FOR13	0-7869-1430-0
Reviewed in Envoyer magazine #44.
The Dalelands	L. Richard Baker III	1993	64 + map	FRS1	1-5607-6667-0
Translated into German and reviewed in Envoyer magazine #39.
Aurora's Whole Realms Catalog	―	1992	160	―	1-5607-6327-2
Book of Lairs	Nicky Rea and Sam Witt	1995	96	―	1-56076-924-6
Calimport	Steven E. Schend	1998	96	―	0786912383
The City of Ravens Bluff	Ed Greenwood	1998	160	―	0-7869-1195-6
City of Splendors	Ed Greenwood and Steven E. Schend	1994	―	―	1-5607-6868-1
Cloak & Dagger	Eric L. Boyd, Sean K. Reynolds, and Steven E. Schend	2000	160	―	0-7869-1627-3
Cormanthyr: Empire of the Elves	Steven E. Schend and Kevin Melka	1998	160	―	0-7869-0761-4
Cormyr	―	1994	64	―	1-5607-6818-5
Translated into German and reviewed in Envoyer magazine #26.
Demihuman Deities	―	1998	192	―	0-7869-1239-1
Drizzt Do'Urden's Guide to the Underdark	Eric L. Boyd	1999	128	―	0-7869-1509-9
Drizzt Do'Urden's Guide to the Underdark was published by Wizards of the Coast, written by Eric L. Boyd, and published in 1999. It details the Underdark in the north and west of Faerûn, including the city of Menzoberranzan. The book has Drizzt Do'Urden as its nominal guide. The guide starts with an introduction that defines the physical boundaries of the Underdark, and also describes the intent and organization of the book and gives a brief list of D&D materials which have a strong connection to the Underdark. A critical review describes it as "...the single-most comprehensive sourcebook on the realms of the Underdark that lie beneath the Sword Coast. It talks about the major peoples of the Underworld and details dozens of cities, including Menzoberranzan". It further states, "...Boyd's extensive research results in Underdark being full of tiny references."
Elminster's Ecologies	―	1994	210	―	1-5607-6917-3
Boxed set containing nine booklets.
Elminster's Ecologies Appendix I: The Battle of Bones / Hill of Lost Souls	―	1995	―	―	0-7869-0115-2
Elminster's Ecologies Appendix II: The High Moor / The Serpent Hills	―	1995	―	―	0-7869-0171-3
Empires of the Shining Sea	―	1999	192	―	0-7869-1237-5
Faiths & Avatars	―	1996	192	―	0-7869-0384-8
The Fall of Myth Drannor	Steven E. Schend	1998	64	―	0-7869-1235-9
Forgotten Realms Adventures	Jeff Grubb, Ed Greenwood	March 1990	160	―	0-88038-828-5
The Forgotten Realms Atlas	―	1990	210	―	0-8803-8857-9
Forgotten Realms Campaign Setting	―	1993	―	―	1-5607-6617-4
Revised version published in 1996
Heroes' Lorebook	―	1995	160	―	0-7869-0412-7
The Horde	―	1990	Boxed set	―	0-88038-868-4
Lands of Intrigue	Steven E. Schend	1997	Boxed set	―	0-7869-0697-9
Maztica Campaign Set	―	1991	Boxed set	―	1-56076-084-2
Menzoberranzan	Ed Greenwood, R.A. Salvatore and Douglas Niles	1992	Boxed set	―	1-5607-6460-0
Monstrous Compendium Forgotten Realms Appendix	David Cook, Steve Winter, Jon Pickens	1989	64	MC3	0-88038-769-6
Monstrous Compendium Forgotten Realms Appendix	David Cook, et al	1992	32	MC11	1-5607-6111-3
Monstrous Compendium Kara-Tur Appendix	Rick Swan	1990	68	MC6	0-88038-851-X
The Moonsea	John Terra	1995	-	-	0-7869-0092-X
Netheril: Empire of Magic	―	1996	160	―	0-7869-0437-2
The North: Guide to the Savage Frontier	―	1996	192	―	0-7869-0391-0
Player's Guide to the Forgotten Realms Campaign	―	1993	132	―	1-56076-695-6
Powers & Pantheons	Eric L. Boyd	1997	192	―	0-7869-0657-X
Prayers from the Faithful	Ed Greenwood and Doug Stewart	1997	128	―	0-7869-0682-0
Sea of Fallen Stars	―	1999	192	―	0-7869-1393-2
Reviewed in Envoyer magazine #38.
Spellbound	―	1995	Boxed set	―	0-7869-0139-X
The Ruins of Myth Drannor	―	1993	Boxed set	―	1-5607-6569-0
The Ruins of Undermountain	―	1991	Boxed set	―	1-5607-6061-3
The Ruins of Undermountain II: The Deep Levels	―	1994	Boxed set	―	1-5607-6821-5
Ruins of Zhentil Keep	―	1995	Boxed set	―	0-7869-0109-8
Skullport	―	1999	―	―	
The Vilhon Reach	―	1996	―	―	0-7869-0400-3
Villains' Lorebook	―	1998	159	―	0-7869-1236-7
Volo's Guide to All Things Magical	―	1996	128	―	0-7869-0446-1
Volo's Guide to Baldur's Gate II	Ed Greenwood	2000	128	―	0-7869-1626-5
Volo's Guide to Cormyr	―	1995	240	―	0-7869-0151-9
Volo's Guide to the Dalelands	―	1996	240	―	0-7869-0406-2
Volo's Guide to the Dalelands details the Dalelands, with its guide Volo taking readers from Daggerdale in the North through to the High Dale in the South. Volo's rating system goes by five pipes or tankards to indicate a top tavern, five coins to mean high prices, and five daggers a dangerous place to hang out. Locations and characters described in the book can be used as foundations on which proper Dalelands scenarios can be built. This is the fifth installment of Volo's guides to the Forgotten Realms. Trenton Webb reviewed Volo's Guide to the Dalelands for Arcane magazine, rating it a 6 out of 10 overall.
Volo's Guide to the North	Ed Greenwood	1993	240	―	1-5607-6678-6
Volo's Guide to the Sword Coast	―	1994	240	―	1-56076-904-1
Volo's Guide to Waterdeep	―	1993	240	―	1-56076-335-3

=== 3rd edition supplements ===
Title	Author	Date	Subject	Pages	ISBN
Champions of Ruin	Jeff Crook, Wil Upchurch, and Eric L. Boyd	May 2005	―	―	0-7869-3692-4
Champions of Valor	Thomas M. Reid and Sean K. Reynolds	November 2005	―	_	0-7869-3697-5
City of Splendors: Waterdeep	Eric L. Boyd	July 2005	―	_	0-7869-3693-2
Dragons of Faerûn	Eric L. Boyd and Eytan Bernstein	August 2006	―	_	0-7869-3923-0
Faiths and Pantheons	Eric L. Boyd and Erik Mona	May 2002	―	224	0-7869-2759-3
Forgotten Realms Campaign Setting	Ed Greenwood, Sean K. Reynolds, Skip Williams and Rob Heinsoo	June 1, 2001	details the Forgotten Realms setting and contains information on characters, locations and history, and sets specific rules	320	0-7869-1836-5
The Grand History of the Realms	Brian R. James, Ed Greenwood, George Krashos, Eric L. Boyd and Thomas Costa	September 2007	―	_	978-0-7869-4731-7
Lords of Darkness	Jason Carl and Sean K. Reynolds	2001	―	192	0-7869-1989-2
Lost Empires of Faerûn	Richard Baker, Ed Bonny, and Travis Stout	2005	―	192	0-7869-3654-1
Magic of Faerûn	Sean K. Reynolds, Duane Maxwell, and Angel Leigh McCoy	2001	―	192	0-7869-1964-7
Monsters of Faerûn	James Wyatt and Rob Heinsoo	2001	―	_	0-7869-1832-2
Mysteries of the Moonsea	Wil Upchurch, Sean K. Reynolds, Darrin Drader and Thomas M. Reid	June 2006	―	_	0-7869-3915-X
Player's Guide to Faerûn	Richard Baker, Travis Stout, and James Wyatt	March 2004	―	_	0-7869-3134-5
Power of Faerûn	Ed Greenwood and Eric L. Boyd	March 2006	―	_	0-7869-3910-9
Races of Faerûn	Eric L. Boyd, James Jacobs, and Matt Forbeck	March 2003	―	_	0-7869-2875-1
Serpent Kingdoms	Eric L. Boyd, Darrin Drader, and Ed Greenwood	July 2004	―	_	0-7869-3277-5
Shining South	Thomas M. Reid	October 2004	―	_	0-7869-3492-1
Silver Marches	Ed Greenwood and Jason Carl	2002	―	_	0-7869-2835-2
Unapproachable East	Richard Baker, Matt Forbeck, and Sean K. Reynolds	May 2003	―	_	0-7869-2881-6
Underdark	Bruce R. Cordell, Gwendolyn F.M. Kestrel, and Jeff Quick	October 2003	―	_	0-7869-3053-5

=== 4th edition supplements ===
Title	Author	Date	Subject	Pages	ISBN
Forgotten Realms Campaign Guide	Bruce R. Cordell, Ed Greenwood, and Chris Sims	August 19, 2008	A guide for game masters about the Forgotten Realms setting. Provides background information on the lands of Faerûn, a detailed town in which to start a campaign, adventure seeds, new monsters, ready-to-play NPCs, and a full-colour poster map of Faerûn.	288	978-0-7869-4924-3
Forgotten Realms Player's Guide	Rob Heinsoo, Logan Bonner, and Robert J. Schwalb	September 16, 2008	Presents the changed Forgotten Realms setting from the point of view of the adventurers exploring it. Includes new feats, character powers, paragon paths, and epic destinies.	160	978-0-7869-4929-8
Underdark	Andy Collins	January 19, 2010	Provides information needed to run adventures in the Underdark, a subterranean domain beneath the surface of Faerûn.	160	978-0-7869-5387-5
Halls of Undermountain	Matt Sernett and Shawn Merwin	April 17, 2012	Adventure detailing the mega-dungeon of Undermountain that lies beneath the city of Waterdeep.	96	978-0-7869-5994-5
Menzoberranzan: City of Intrigue	Wizards RPG Team	August 21, 2012	Describes the drow city-state of Menzoberranzan in the Underdark.	128	978-0-7869-6036-1
Neverwinter Campaign Setting	Erik Scott de Bie	August 16, 2011	Describes the city-state of Neverwinter in the Sword Coast region.	224	978-0-7869-5814-6
Ed Greenwood Presents Elminster's Forgotten Realms	Ed Greenwood	October 16, 2012	An edition neutral sourcebook published as Wizards of the Coast transitioned Dungeons and Dragons for 4th edition to 5th edition.	192	978-0-7869-6034-7

=== 5th edition supplements ===
Numerous books released between 2014 and 2024 applied to all settings, but used elements from the Forgotten Realms as framing devices. These include: Volo's Guide to Monsters, Xanathar's Guide to Everything, Mordenkainen's Tome of Foes, Tasha's Cauldron of Everything, and Mordenkainen Presents: Monsters of the Multiverse.

Title	Author	Date	Subject	Pages	ISBN
Sword Coast Adventurer's Guide	Wizards RPG Team, Green Ronin	November 3, 2015	Describes the Sword Coast region of Faerûn.	159	978-0-7869-6580-9
Acquisitions Incorporated	Teos Abadia, Jerry Holkins, Elyssa Grant, Scott Fitzgerald Gray, Shawn Merwin	June 18, 2019	Focuses on the adventuring company Acquisitions Incorporated, and includes an adventure for levels 1–6 titled "The Orrery of the Wanderer".	224	978-0786966905
Forgotten Realms: Adventures in Faerûn	Jason Tondro (lead designer), Bill Benham, Makenzie De Armas, Dan Dillon, Ron Lundeen, Ben Petrisor, Patrick Renie, Sarra Scherb, Shahreena Shahrani, Carl Sibley, Chris S. Sims, David Somerville	November 11, 2025	Locations and lore about the Forgotten Realms as well as monsters and adventures for dungeon masters.	288	978-0786969951
Forgotten Realms: Heroes of Faerûn	Jason Tondro (lead designer), Bill Benham, Makenzie De Armas, Dan Dillon, Ron Lundeen, Ben Petrisor, Patrick Renie, Shahreena Shahrani, Carl Sibley, Chris Sims, David Sommerville	November 11, 2025	Adds new subclasses, backgrounds, spells and equipment for characters in the Forgotten Realms. Describes factions and gods that characters can join or oppose.	192	978-0786969937
