= The Ruins of Undermountain =

Forgotten Realms boxed set accessory

- Author: Ed Greenwood
- Genre: Role-playing game
- Publisher: TSR
- Publication date: 1991
- Media type: Boxed set
- Pages: 128
- ISBN: 9781560760610

The Ruins of Undermountain is a boxed set for the Forgotten Realms campaign setting for the second edition of the Advanced Dungeons & Dragons fantasy role-playing game. The set was written by Ed Greenwood and published by TSR. It featured box cover art by Brom. and was published in 1991.

== Contents ==
The set consists of a 128-page booklet titled Campaign Guide to Undermountain, a 32-page booklet titled Undermountain Adventures, 8 double-sided loose-leaf monster statistics pages, 8 double-sided heavy-stock "adventure aid" cards, and 4 color fold-out poster maps.

It uses the same Brom cover art as the box cover itself, with interior art by Karl Waller and cartography by Diesel, Steve Beck, and David Sutherland. This book contains detailed information on the dungeon Undermountain, including non-player characters (such as Halaster Blackcloak) that can be encountered within the dungeons or in the city above it, as well as spells and magic items that can be found. The book also keys the maps to what can be found in various locations and contains expansion guidelines for creating future adventures and deeper parts of the dungeon.

The set provides the "first three levels of the original dungeon of Undermountain, beneath the city of Waterdeep". The entire Ruins of Undermountain is purported to be the "deepest dungeon of them all" with nine levels and fourteen sub-levels. It contains two books describing the Undermountain complex. The larger is the Campaign Guide to Undermountain. It includes Undermountain history and other related information. The second book contains adventures, monster descriptions, maps, and other products.

There are over 350 rooms per level, but not all are detailed: "even with approximately 25 areas of interest on the first level, 26 on the second level and none on the third, a remarkably high percentage of rooms are left completely undetailed".

The Undermountain Adventures booklet describes seven adventures designed to be used within Undermountain, but can be used in any dungeon. The booklet also contains a "Monster Guide" of statblocks and descriptions of monsters not otherwise featured in the boxed set, and a description of the city of Skullport. The booklet has a detached cover, with cover art by Jeff Easley, and maps of some of the encounters on the inside, with cartography by David Sutherland.

The monster sheets detail 11 monsters in the Monstrous Compendium style: elder orb beholder, death kiss beholder-kin, darktentacles, ibrandlin, scaladar, sharn, slithermorph, flying snakes (flying fang and deathfang), steel shadow, and watchghost.

The cards are adventure aids for the Dungeon Master, detailing traps, encounters, treasure, and sundries that can be placed in the midst of adventures.

The maps detail the first three levels of the ruins of Undermountain; level three takes up two of the maps.

== Publication history ==
Shannon Appelcline commented that "The Ruins of Undermountain (1991), located under the City of Waterdeep, was one of the first real "mega" dungeons — though it trailed Greyhawk's own offering, Greyhawk Ruins, by a year."

== Reception ==
The adventure was ranked the 17th greatest adventure of all time by Dungeon magazine for the 30th anniversary of the Dungeons & Dragons game in 2004.

Keith Eisenbeis reviewed the module in the February 1992 issue of White Wolf Magazine. He noted the appearance of the product materials, especially the maps, as exceptional, but the remainder of lesser quality. Overall, he rated the product a 3 out of a possible 5.

== Reviews ==
- Casus Belli #65

== See also ==
- Undermountain: The Lost Level
- Undermountain: Maddgoth's Castle
- Expedition to Undermountain
- Halls of Undermountain
- Waterdeep: Dungeon of the Mad Mage
