= FR4 =

FR4 may refer to:

- FR-4 or FR4, a NEMA grade designation for glass-reinforced epoxy laminate material
- The Magister, the fourth supplement of the Forgotten Realms series role-playing game
- France 4, a television channel in France
