= Steven Schend =

American game designer

Steven E. Schend
- Born: 1967 (age 58–59); Madison, Wisconsin, U.S.
- Occupations: Writer, game designer
- Writing career
- Genres: Role-playing games, fantasy

Steven E. Schend (born 1967 in Madison, Wisconsin) is an American game designer and editor who has worked on a number of products for the Dungeons & Dragons fantasy role-playing game from TSR throughout the 1990s.

== Biography ==
Steven Schend was born in Madison, Wisconsin in 1967. Schend developed an interest in the worlds of L. Frank Baum's Oz and Edgar Rice Burroughs's Barsoom. Schend grew up in Kenosha, Wisconsin, and started gaming in high school; he attended college in Madison, and graduated with a degree in English in 1989. He previously worked as a teacher, a street sweeper, a concrete curb builder and a landscaper before gaining employment in fantasy. TSR hired Schend as a Games Department editor in early 1990, and he also managed the original Marvel Super Heroes RPG line: "I started working on Marvel pretty much the day I walked in the door".

At TSR, Schend also worked on the Forgotten Realms setting. "Most of all, I'm proud of my body of work within the Realms. So much of it ties together that it's hard to pick favorites. If I had to, I'd choose the... Sea of Fallen Stars accessory as the most original world-building I've ever done." Schend and Julia Martin served as the continuity monitors for the Realms, and Schend also served as the assistant manager to the Realms product group for three years before returning to full-time design work in 1998. Schend then began working on the Alternity game line and the Star*Drive setting. Schend worked for over fifteen years with TSR, Inc., Wizards of the Coast, and other game companies as an editor, a designer, an assistant manager, and world builder.

As a game designer and editor he has worked for TSR, Inc., Wizards of the Coast, Bastion Press, Green Ronin, and Goodman Games. He later worked as an adult instructor of World Building for Writers and Game & Adventure Design workshops/seminars; also teaching college classes at various venues, including Kendall College of Art and Design. He claims his favorite role is as spokesperson for the denizens of the Forgotten Realms.

Schend has taught writing at a local college in Grand Rapids, Michigan. Schend works as a bookseller, and also writes novels, novellas, and short stories from the Forgotten Realms to his own contemporary fantasies. He has also worked on a novel in his "Vanguard" universe and a non-fiction World-Building book for writers.

== Works ==
Steven Schend worked on several Dungeons & Dragons game products from 1990 to 2001. His design work includes several products for the Forgotten Realms line, such as City of Splendors: Waterdeep (1994), Undermountain: Maddgoth's Castle (1996), Undermountain: The Lost Level (1996), Lands of Intrigue (1997), Hellgate Keep (1998), Cormanthyr: Empire of the Elves (1998), Wyrmskull Throne (1999), Skullport (1999), and Sea of Fallen Stars (1999). Schend also did some work for Bastion Press and Green Ronin Publishing.

His Forgotten Realms novels include Blackstaff (2006) and Blackstaff Tower (2008).
