= Waterdeep: Dungeon of the Mad Mage =

Tabletop role-playing game adventure

- Rules required: Dungeons & Dragons, 5th edition
- Character levels: 5-20
- Campaign setting: Forgotten Realms
- First published: 20 November 2018

Waterdeep: Dungeon of the Mad Mage is an adventure module for the 5th edition of the Dungeons & Dragons fantasy role-playing game. It is the second part of the Waterdeep storyline and follows the first adventure, Waterdeep: Dragon Heist.

== Plot summary ==
Undermountain is the lair of the insane wizard Halaster Blackcloak who descended into madness as he dug deeper under the city of Waterdeep and expanded his domain. Many creatures overpowered by Blackcloak are contained in different levels of his lair along with multiple portals to other parts of the Forgotten Realms and the multiverse. Adventurers set off on a subterranean dungeon crawl that starts in the Yawning Portal tavern and explores twenty-three levels of Undermountain and the refuge of Skullport (which is both a connection to the seedier side of Waterdeep and to the Underdark). This is the first official published adventure with content intended for "tier four" (levels 17–20) in 5th edition.

== Publication history ==
Waterdeep: Dungeon of the Mad Mage was inspired by The Ruins of Undermountain, Undermountain: The Lost Level, Undermountain: Maddgoth's Castle, Expedition to Undermountain, and Halls of Undermountain.

The new module was announced in June 2018 during the Stream of Many Eyes livestreamed event on the Wizards of the Coast's Twitch site. Waterdeep: Dungeon of the Mad Mage was released on November 20, 2018, as part of the fantasy storyline "Waterdeep". Waterdeep: Dungeon of the Mad Mage is available as a digital product through the following Wizards of the Coast licensees: D&D Beyond, Fantasy Grounds, and Roll20.

A corresponding product, Waterdeep: Dungeon of the Mad Mage Maps and Miscellany, was also released. This product reprinted handouts and 26 maps from the book on 8.5" x 11" cardstock sheets designed for use with dry-erase markers.

== Reception ==
In Publishers Weekly's "This Week's Bestsellers: December 3, 2018", Waterdeep: Dungeon of the Mad Mage was #18 for "Hardcover Nonfiction".

Rob Hudak, for SLUG Magazine, wrote that "the premise is straightforward enough—an immortal, crackpot wizard went and turned the backside of a nearby mountain into a sadistic amusement park. Don't mistake the 'amusement' as necessarily intended as your own; Halaster Blackcloak, the aforementioned, arcane looney, has gone to great lengths in order to play with the playthings that wander his halls in search of wealth and fame. As such, DMs have a glut of monsters, traps and magical malefactions to inflict upon unsuspecting opportunists. [...] My main criticism with this book is the columns and columns of text that start to blur together. Each chapter follows a near-identical format, making it difficult to differentiate which floor had what trap or if that cave actually contained a giant centipede or interplanar frog people. Each dungeon level features a contextual header to complement its contents, a full-page map, and occasionally something smaller to represent a magical artifact or creepy-crawly. This has a bit of a knock-on effect to the art department. While still present, the usually prominent and evocative illustrations that adorn each Fifth-Edition book thus far feel somewhat sparse".

For Bleeding Cool, Gavin Sheehan wrote that "this dungeon, nay, this entire book was designed to be an experiment in how good you are at your skill sheet. No one person can navigate this thing and it requires a decently balanced team. [...] There are weird little sidequests in every level of the dungeon that play a role in the history of these caves and how the Undermountain came to be. This is hardcore D&D lore on steroids, with a pinch of danger where you may or may not be able to escape in the process. [...] If all you ever love to do in D&D is fight monsters and level up with very little storyline going on, then this is for you. But if you're looking for much more substance than finding gold, killing things, and finding out what's up with this wizard in the basement, there are other tomes in 5th Edition that would serve you better. It's not a bad book, it's not a great book, but it is right in the middle".

Jason Wilson, for VentureBeat, had previously written about his love of megadungeons such as Undermountain and on this incarnation he wrote that it "is the deep complex beneath the city of Waterdeep, and it's the creation of an insane wizard, Halaster Blackcloak, and this campaign book for Dungeons & Dragons explores these halls better than any production beforehand. It's a fun read even if you don't plan on running a party of adventurers through this deathtrap. But this isn't just about the lore and the fun. It works with an earlier campaign from this year, Waterdeep: Dragon Heist, and when you use both together, it combines for an epic campaign that takes your players from 1st level all the way to 20th level. And it's all in (or under) one city. That's an amazing feat".

Kody Keplinger, for The Mary Sue, wrote that in regards of changing demographics in Dungeons & Dragons that "this shift, making D&D more welcoming to non-straight-white-male players, is by no means an accident. With the game's fifth edition, it's clear that D&D publisher Wizards of the Coast has been making an effort to foster a diverse community around the game, both in its outreach and in its published materials. This feels most apparent in its most recent modules. In Waterdeep: Dragon Heist, a non-player character shopkeeper uses they/them pronouns and politely corrects player characters if they're misgendered. In the followup module, Waterdeep: Dungeon of the Mad Mage, player characters may encounter an NPC whom they can aid in returning to her wife (who happens to be an NPC from an earlier module.) These are only two examples of many, and while they may seem small on the surface, these subtle efforts to populate The Forgotten Realms—D&D's most popular campaign setting—with queer characters can be quite meaningful to a community starved for representation in these geeky spaces".
