= Empires of the Sands =

1988 tabletop role-playing game supplement

- Code: FR3
- Rules required: AD&D
- Character levels: NA
- Campaign setting: Forgotten Realms
- Authors: Scott Haring
- First published: 1988

Linked modules
- FR1 FR2 FR3 FR4 FR5 FR6 FR7 FR8 FR9 FR10 FR11 FR12 FR13 FR14 FR15 FR16

Empires of the Sands is an accessory for the fictional Forgotten Realms campaign setting for the first edition of the Advanced Dungeons & Dragons fantasy role-playing game. The book was published in 1988 and written by Scott Haring, with cover and interior art by Jeff Easley.

== Contents ==
The 64-page booklet, which is wrapped in a removable cover, includes a one page introduction, explaining that this book covers three major areas of in the southwest corner of the continent of Faerûn known as the Empires of the Sands: Amn (pages 3–20), Tethyr (pages 21–47), and Calimshan (pages 48–62). Each of the nations located along the southern coast of the Sea of Swords, an area with a warm climate and large areas of dry, inhospitable land, receives its own section, and each section begins with a general description including the races present, followed by information covering their languages and social customs, monsters that inhabit the area, the history, government and politics, and religions, as well as information on the geography and climate, trade, cities and places of interest, and notable non-player characters.

Most cities receive only a column of text on the average, with some descriptions consisting of just noting what each city is renowned for, its exports, population, government, and location. The center of the booklet is taken up with one blank character sheet, seven character sheets filled in with the statistics for the Company of Eight from Tethyr, and reduced maps of the area. The last page, page 64, features an index to the book. The book also contains two maps which match up with the edges of the maps found in the Forgotten Realms Campaign Set. The pair of fold-out color poster maps depict the three countries at a scale of 30 miles to the inch, making them compatible with other maps in the series.

Amn is the northernmost of the three countries, a place where everything is geared towards the acquisition of money, and the conspicuous consumption of the rich is evident everywhere. Conversations are filled with references to money, whether or not the current topic has any connection with financial transactions. The country was once divided, with its cities banding together only for mutual defense, while the rest of the time they struggled with each other over trade routes. During one trade war, the Council of Six, with a mysterious membership comprising some of Amn's most powerful trade houses, emerged as leaders of a united country. With the council promoting free enterprise, the making of money takes precedence over everything else, and anyone who can make money is well respected. Adventuring groups and magic-users are actively discouraged from plying their trades, unless they are properly licensed with the government.

In neighboring Tethyr, anarchy rules. The former royal family have all been killed, and the country is fractured into petty kingdoms, independent villages and towns, and bandit holdings. The Company of Eight is a group of eight adventurers dedicated to promoting peace in Tethyr.

The Calim desert covers a sizable area of Calimshan, and dominates much of Calimshan's life and outlook as a result. The lands bordering it are only slightly more fertile. In Calimshan, wealth is of the utmost importance, which is sought after so that the seeker can lead a life of leisure. While few attain this goal, most Calimshanites aspire towards it. Gadgets and magical items are commonly found in Calimshan, where they are widely used as labor-saving devices. Magic-users are held in high esteem, being the providers of the much-sought-after magical devices. Calimshan is ruled by the Pasha in Calimport, although each city governs itself in practice, with the Pasha being unable to carry out any major actions without the permission of at least some of the cities' viziers. The magic-users of Calimshan have accidentally or intentionally summoned and released a substantial number of other-planar beings; after a good time running amok through their summoners’ homes and villages, those planar beings who are unable to undertake the return trip home on their own gravitate toward the Calim Desert, which they find greatly to their liking.

== Publication history ==
FR3 Empires of the Sands was written by Scott Haring, with art by Jeff Easley, and was published by TSR with product code TSR 9224 in 1988 as a 64-page booklet with two large color maps and an outer folder. Editing is by Karen S. Martin, and cartography is by Dave S. LaForce. Empires of the Sands was Haring's first big project at TSR, and after its publication he answered readers' questions in Dragon No. 138 (October 1988).

== Reception ==
Jim Bambra reviewed Empires of the Sands for Dragon magazine No. 140 (December 1988). Bambra commented that the name "Empires of the Sands" is strange for the three countries described in the set, as none "is an empire in the formal sense, and only Calimshan has a desert worth mentioning. Still, the lands down here are very arid and, to a northerner used to rolling grasslands, the sparce [sic] patches of scrub and brush which dot the southern landscape could well appear to be desert." He felt that Empires of the Sands is really three source packs in one, with each country being described in its own separate section, and felt that the booklet has the same high standard of production as Waterdeep and the North and Moonshae, although like FR2 Moonshae, the inside of the folder cover was left blank and could have been used for some purpose. He felt that the writing, "while lacking the flavor of FR2 Moonshae, is informative, readable, and easy to reference during play".

He criticized the lack of detail for locations, particularly cities, due to the large area covered by the supplement: "While information is provided on each city, not all of the cities make for interesting reading. [...] All of this information could easily have been presented in the form of a table, thereby making it more accessible and providing more space for other aspects of the campaign area to be described." Bambra commented that most of the content in the center of the booklet "looks like filler, perhaps an indication that this project wasn't quite big enough to fill its allocated page count". Bambra concluded his review with an overall evaluation: "Empires of the Sands has a much wider focus than [Watedeep and the North and Moonshae], and yet it still manages to convey the atmosphere of each country in a satisfying manner. However, [dungeon masters] are required to put in a fair amount of work to bring these countries to life. With three countries to choose from, though, it's really only necessary to develop one of them for campaign play. With its lack of centralized government, Tethyr makes an ideal setting for power hungry adventurers. Calimshan is a good place for magical research, and Amn is the kind of area that most adventuring groups will find very unhealthy."

== Reviews ==
- Australian Realms #2
