= Moonshae =

1987 tabletop role-playing game accessory

- Code: FR2
- Rules required: AD&D
- Character levels: NA
- Campaign setting: Forgotten Realms
- Authors: Douglas Niles
- First published: 1987

Linked modules
- FR1 FR2 FR3 FR4 FR5 FR6 FR7 FR8 FR9 FR10 FR11 FR12 FR13 FR14 FR15 FR16

Moonshae is an accessory for the Dungeons & Dragons Forgotten Realms campaign setting. It describes the Moonshae Isles of Faerûn.

== Contents ==
Moonshae is a supplement which details the Celtic-inspired islands in the Sea of Moonshae, setting for the novel Darkwalker on Moonshae and its sequels by Doug Niles, describing the climate, topography, and economy of the region, including the Korinn Archipelago, which was created by Aaron Allston and first detailed in the module N4 Treasure Hunt. It also details two regional cultures and their lands: the indigenous people known as the Ffolk, and the invading Northmen.

The book discusses the character races, character classes, politics, conflicts, geography, and economics within the Moonshaes. The islands are home to the Ffolk, a druidic people who worship the Earthmother, a neutrally aligned aspect of Chauntea, the neutral-good goddess of agriculture. The Ffolk share the Moonshaes with the Northmen, a strong, warlike race of raiders who hail from the lands north of Waterdeep. Conflicts frequently erupt between the two races, as the Northmen expand their holdings on the Moonshaes at the expense of the Ffolk. Magic-users are viewed with suspicion by both groups. The Moonshaes are also home to marauding firbolgs, orcs, goblins, trolls, and other more dangerous monsters.

The book next describes the major supernatural entities which exist in the countryside and seas. The most important of these is the Earthmother. She gives life and vitality to the land, and her power is manifested in the Moonwells. The Moonwells are pools of water with the magical power to cure the wounds of those who strive to maintain the "mystic balance", and are tended by druids who can use them to charge or restore charges in magical items. The Earthmother is served by her three immortal children: Leviathan, a huge whale; Kamerynnm, a majestic unicorn; and the Pack, a pack of dire wolves who roam the Isles. They are opposed by the evil Kazgoroth the Beast, who seeks to disrupt the balance and bring corruption to the Isles, aided by its magically created Blood Warriors: undead soldiers who obey its every command.

Several specific locales of the Moonshaes are also described, from the perspective of Elminster as a tour of the people and places he has visited. The style of presentation is similar to that used in the Forgotten Realms Campaign Set.

The 64-page booklet comes wrapped in a removable cover. Included with the book is a fold-out color poster map of the Moonshae Isles, which lie to the west of the main continent of the Forgotten Realms setting. This large color insert has maps of the Moonshae Isles printed on both sides. One side is at a scale of 20 miles per inch, while the reverse is scaled at 30 miles per inch. Both maps contain the same amount of detail, the major difference being that there is less open sea surrounding the 20-miles-per-inch map. One of the maps lines up with the edges of the maps in the Forgotten Realms Campaign Set. Two appendixes explain using the Moonshaes in a campaign and the magical items of the Moonshaes.

== Publication history ==
FR2 Moonshae was written by Douglas Niles, with cover art by Tim Hildebrandt and interior illustrations by George Barr, and was published by TSR in 1987. The book features editing by Mike Breault, and cartography by Dave S. LaForce.

Shannon Appelcline commented that as role-playing games became supplemented with more background material published in the 1980s, "TSR finally recognized this new direction and made it an industry standard in the late '80s. This wasn't through their publication of the Forgotten Realms Campaign Setting (1987) — which was a lot like The World of Greyhawk campaign box that had preceded it — but rather through their release of a string of detailed setting books that began with FR1: Waterdeep and the North (1987) and FR2: Moonshae (1987)."

In June 2018 Wizards of the Coast working with Baldman Games published Rising Shadows: Moonshae Isles Regional Guide by Shawn Merwin, Robert Alaniz, and Eric Menge. Douglas Niles provided a foreword.

== Reception ==
Jim Bambra reviewed Moonshae for the December issue of Dragon magazine in 1988. Bambra felt that the physical quality of the supplement was high, although he felt that not all available space was used to its best effect. For example, the inside of the wrap-around cover is blank, as it could have been used to provide village or town maps, or even sample monster lairs. He did feel that maps were also put to good use to graphically depict the extent of Northmen settlements in the Moonshaes, and to show the economies and trade routes of the Isles. Bambra commented on Niles' design of the book: "it's more than just the background and people presented in this supplement that makes Moonshae a very strong source pack. Doug has written about the Moonshaes in his novels, a situation which means he is very familiar with them as a place where people live, work, and play." He criticized the wandering-monster tables, as "Moonshae is designed as an adventure setting for characters of any level, and yet we have beholders and dragon turtles popping up here and there to devastate low-level adventurers".

Bambra found the section called Elminster's Notes to be the most impressive: "Here, the descriptions become very absorbing and vibrant as we follow Elminster on his travels. As well as providing an insight into life in the Moonshaes, we also get a good indication of Elminster's personality and share with him in his discomforts and pleasures." Bambra concludes by saying: "The style of presentation used in Moonshae is superior to the styles used in the other Forgotten Realms setting supplements [...] While not containing as much detailed information as FR1 Waterdeep and the North, Moonshae contains more evocative descriptions and gives a good insight into life in the Isles."
