= Jim Butler (game designer) =

Role-playing game designer

- Occupation: Game designer

Jim Butler is a game designer who has worked primarily on role-playing games.

== Career ==
Butler was the brand manager of the Alternity role-playing game for Wizards of the Coast. He was part of the Alternity team with Bill Slavicsek, Rich Baker, Kim Mohan, David Eckelberry, and rk post. In 2000, Butler announced the cancellation of the Alternity and SAGA lines in an open letter.

His design work for D&D includes The Sword of the Dales (1995), The Secret of Spiderhaunt (1995), The Return of Randal Morn (1995), AD&D Dungeon Master Screen & Master Index (1995), Netheril: Empire of Magic (1996), and Cormanthyr: Empire of the Elves (1998).
