= Sons of Gruumsh =

Dungeons & Dragons adventure module

- Rules required: Dungeons & Dragons, 3.5 edition
- Character levels: 4th
- Authors: Christopher Perkins
- First published: September 2005

Sons of Gruumsh is an adventure module for the 3.5 edition of the Dungeons & Dragons fantasy role-playing game.

== Plot summary ==
Sons of Gruumsh takes place in the Forgotten Realms setting, and involves six missing nobles from Melvaunt, as tribes of orcs in Thar converge on the ruined fortress of Xûl-Jarak, flocking to the banner of a charismatic warlord.

== Publication history ==
Sons of Gruumsh was published in September 2005, and was written by Christopher Perkins, with cover art by Todd Lockwood and interior art by Mike Dubisch.

== Reception ==
Dungeon Master for Dummies lists Sons of Gruumsh as one of the ten best 3rd edition adventures.
