= Pages from the Mages =

1995 role-playing game accessory

- Genre: Role-playing games
- Publisher: TSR
- Publication date: 1995
- ISBN: 0-7869-0183-7

Pages from the Mages is an accessory for the 2nd edition of the Advanced Dungeons & Dragons fantasy role-playing game, published in 1995.

== Contents ==
Pages from the Mages is a supplement which features spells for the Forgotten Realms campaign, collected in a format that presents several spellbooks found in the campaign world, and details the histories of each of these spellbooks within the setting, as well as the backgrounds of the characters who created them and provides clues as to where in the world characters may now find the spellbooks. Most of the spellbooks contain spells commonly known in the game, and those spells detailed in this supplement are mostly unique spells, with many of them named after the characters who created them, and many of these spellbooks have long been prized by characters in the setting. The supplement also contains a few priest spells, instructions for characters to create a number of magic items, and statistics for new monsters.

== Publication history ==
Pages from the Mages was the 8th prestige-format "FOR" (Forgotten Realms) sourcebook published between 1990 and 1995, however, it did not have a module code and it was the first in the series that did not have the traditional black-bordered gloss-on-matte cover. Pages from the Mages is a soft-bound book that was published by TSR. It was designed by Ed Greenwood and Tim Beach, and was published in 1995. The cover design was by Renee Ciske, black and white art by Valerie Valusek and interior four color art by Ned Dameron and Erik Olson.

The content of the book originated in Dragon magazine — Greenwood had been intrigued by named spells "because, he has stated, they made him wonder about their origins: why they'd been created, who their creator was, and how they'd gained their name. He knew the meta-game reason, of course: They matched Jack Vance's naming convention for spells. However, he wanted to know more about their in-game history. This led Greenwood to write 'Pages from the Mages' for Dragon #62 (June 1982). It described four spellbooks, including notes on their appearance and their history. Greenwood purposefully revealed mysterious lore within these histories that would lead players to glimpse a larger world. [...] All told, everything about the books was detailed, so that a GM could pick one up and drop it straight into a dungeon". Greenwood wrote "a total of five articles running through Dragon #100 (August 1985)" with several encore articles in Dragon #164 (December 1990) and Dragon #181 (May 1992). Then in the 1990s, Beach took on TSR's project of turning the series of articles and additional work Greenwood had done for The Magister (1988) into a new book for the 2nd Edition. This included converting spells and other mechanics to work in the newer edition. "Greenwood wasn't aware of the Pages from the Mages book until shortly before it was published, at which time he was asked to write the introduction".

== Reception ==
Cliff Ramshaw reviewed Pages from the Mages for Arcane magazine, rating it a 6 out of 10 overall. He felt that there is "no reason why, in most cases, you can't adapt the new spells it provides to suit your own campaign, but much of the background material - and in many case this is the best stuff - will of course have to be changed". He cautions, after explaining about the background information on the books and their creators: "If you needed further convincing that the life of a wizard is a dangerous one, liable to be terminated quickly and violently, then you'll find it here." He suggests that tracking down one of these spell books "should involve a fair amount of adventuring by the players", and that a character using spells from these books "is bound to create a stir". Ramshaw concludes the review: "Some spells are more useful than others [...] and some can most kindly be described as space-fillers. [...] Not as inspiring as most releases, Pages from the Mages can only be recommended to those who've thoroughly exhausted the existing spell lists."

Shannon Appelcline, the author of Designers & Dragons, wrote "Pages from the Mages contains lots of Realms history, though most of it had previously appeared in Dragon magazine. [...] Elminster's Traveling Spellbook provides a detailed look at the spells of Fâerun's chief mage". Appelcline also highlighted that the book's origins in the 'Pages from the Mages' article series was important because the articles "brought Ed Greenwood's Forgotten Realms into the limelight. Greenwood sometimes referenced his campaign world in his Dragon articles, but the 'Pages from the Mages' articles took that tendency to the next level. They were introduced by a never-before-seen wizard named Elminster, and the histories of the spell books gave more details of Realms history than ever before. When TSR was looking for a new campaign world in the mid-80s, Jeff Grubb remembered Greenwood's 'Pages from the Mages' articles, and that's how the Forgotten Realms came to TSR". On the 'Pages from the Mages' series, Jesse Decker, editor-in-chief of Dragon from 1999 to 2003, said in an interview "It's hard to impart how powerfully I reacted to those articles. I was overwhelmed with the idea that you could make new spells. The realization that you could actually implement your own ideas in the game was just amazing to me. Up until that point, everything I knew about games said that the rules all came from the box. 'Pages from the Mages' changed my world a little bit".

== Reviews ==
- Dragon #225
