= The Accursed Tower =

Role-playing game adventure

The Accursed Tower is a 1999 role-playing game module published by TSR for Advanced Dungeons & Dragons. The adventure is tailored for lower-level player characters.

== Premise ==
The Accursed Tower is set in the Savage Frontier region of the Forgotten Realms campaign setting. Players must embark on a journey from Luskan to the icy north, and defeat evil spell caster Damien Morienus in his fallen tower.

== Publication history ==
The Accursed Tower was published in March 1999.

== Reviews ==
- Envoyer (German language)
- Backstab #15 (French language)
