= The Bloodstone Lands =

1989 Dungeons & Dragons supplement

- Code: FR9
- Rules required: AD&D 2nd Edition
- Campaign setting: Forgotten Realms
- Authors: Bob Salvatore
- First published: 1989

Linked modules
- FR1 FR2 FR3 FR4 FR5 FR6 FR7 FR8 FR9 FR10 FR11 FR12 FR13 FR14 FR15 FR16

The Bloodstone Lands is a module for the Forgotten Realms campaign setting for the 2nd edition of Advanced Dungeons & Dragons. It is also known by its product code FR9.

== Contents ==
The book primarily details the two states of Vaasa and Damara and the rugged wilderness territory that surrounds it, known collectively as "The Bloodstone Lands." The book describes the area introduced in the H series of adventure modules, as well as that of The Icewind Dale Trilogy novels, and also includes 10 suggestions for adventure scenarios. The book provides an overview of the Bloodstone Lands, what their neighbors think, the societies of the Bloodstone Lands, its cities, towns, and villages, the geography of the region, its strongholds, ruins, and dungeons, the movers and shakers of the region, local travelling bands and organizations, and some information on how to run a campaign in the Bloodstone Lands.

== Publication history ==
FR9 The Bloodstone Lands was written by R. A. Salvatore, with cover art by Larry Elmore, and was published by TSR in 1989 as a 64-page booklet with an outer folder. The book also features interior illustrations by Uttam, and cartography by Diesel. This is a 64-page booklet wrapped in a removable cover. Included with the book is a fold-out color poster map.

Th cover art is based on the painting "Deadlock" by Larry Elmore. The same piece was also used for cover art in the 1996 video game Blood & Magic.
