= Forgotten Realms Adventures =

1990 tabletop role-playing game supplement

- Cover art by Clyde Caldwell, 1990
- Author: Jeff Grubb and Ed Greenwood
- Genre: Role-playing game
- Publisher: TSR
- Publication date: 1990
- Media type: Print (Hardcover)
- Pages: 160

Forgotten Realms Adventures is an accessory for the Forgotten Realms campaign setting for the second edition of the Advanced Dungeons & Dragons fantasy role-playing game. The book, with product code TSR 2106, was published in 1990, and was written by Jeff Grubb and Ed Greenwood, with cover art by Clyde Caldwell and interior art by Steven Fabian, Ned Dameron, Larry Elmore, Caldwell, and Jeff Easley.

== Contents ==
Forgotten Realms Adventures is a sourcebook which revised material from the earlier Forgotten Realms Sourcebook and Cyclopedia, updating it for the 2nd edition rules and the three years of products released for the Forgotten Realms up to that time. Among other things, this book discusses the deities, secret societies, treasures, spells and magic rules unique to the campaign setting, as well as short descriptions and maps of the heartlands and its cities.

The 154-page hardcover book features a one-page foreword from each of the authors. Jeff Grubb explains that this book introduces the Realms to the second edition of Advanced Dungeons & Dragons, and gives a brief overview of setting's history.

Chapter 1 (pages 1–13) details the changes that have occurred to the Forgotten Realms setting since the publishing of the original Forgotten Realms Campaign Set, after the Time of Troubles - the events of the first three books of The Avatar Series of novels. This chapter describes how to transition characters from the 1st to the 2nd edition. This chapter also describes physical changes to the Realms, including "dead magic regions" (where no magic will function), and "wild magic regions" (spells cast within the area may be altered radically). Firearm technology is also introduced to the setting.

Chapter 2 (pages 15–39) details three dozen of the various deities of the Realms, along with special rules focused on their priests, and introduces the concept of specialty priests: variants of the cleric with a slightly different set of abilities. The portfolios of 32 deities of the setting are described, along with notes and an illustration for each god's specialty priests, including: Auril, Azuth, Beshaba, Chauntea, Cyric, Deneir, Eldath, Gond, Helm, Ilmater, Lathander, Leira, Lliira, Loviatar, Malar, Mask, Mielikki, Milil, Mystra, Oghma, Selûne, Shar, Silvanus, Sune, Talona, Talos, Tempus, Torm, Tymora, Tyr, Umberlee, and Waukeen. Brief notes are given on nonhuman deities, elemental cults (including those of Grumbar, Kossuth, Akadi, and Istishia), beast cults, and the cult of Ao. The Dead Three (Bane, Bhaal, and Myrkul) are also described in the same manner as the 32 active deities.

Chapter 3 (pages 41–67) details magic and the changes to magic and mages in the Realms. This chapter presents 81 magic spells which are in general use, including spells bearing the names of notable mages such as Laeral, Khelben, The Simbul, and Elminster.

Chapter 4 (pages 69–122) provides detailed descriptions of several cities in the Heartlands of the Realms. This includes information on the ruling authorities (both official and unofficial), population statistics, major products, armed forces, notable mages, significant churches, rogues' and thieves' guilds, equipment shops, adventurers' quarters, key characters, and other important town features. 24 cities are described, including Arabel, Baldur's Gate, Berdusk, Calaunt, Daerlun, Elturel, Eversult, Hillsfar, Iriaebor, Marsember, Mulmaster, Ordelun, Procampur, Saerlun, Scornubel, Selgaunt, Shadowdale, Suzail, Tantras, Tilverton, Urmlaspyr, Westgate, Yhaunn, and Zhentil Keep. Also included is a page featuring heraldry symbols of various nations, towns, dales, mercenary units, and other organizations, in addition to other symbols shown throughout the text.

Chapter 5 (pages 123-128) details secret societies of the heartlands, including the Harpers, the Zhentarim, and the Red Wizards of Thay.

Chapter 6 (pages 129-146) details a wide variety of different types of treasure that adventuring player characters may discover. Various types of gems, ornamental stones, semi-precious stones, fancy stones, precious stones, gem stones, jewels, hardstones, shells, and art objects are described in detail.

Four appendices are also included in the book. Appendix 1, on page 147, is a treasure table for determining random treasure. Appendix 2 (pages 148-149) is a list of wizard spells by school, Appendix 3 (pages 150-151) is a list of wizard spells by level, Appendix 4 (pages 152-153) contains random spell lists; these three appendices compile spells from Forgotten Realms Adventures and the second edition Player's Handbook.

Page 154 contains a bibliography of Forgotten Realms products for collectors. This bibliography details all Forgotten Realms products published by TSR up to March 1990. This includes all boxed sets, adventures and accessories, board games, products for the Kara-Tur setting, and novels.

== Publication history ==
Forgotten Realms Adventures was written by Jeff Grubb and Ed Greenwood, with a cover by Clyde Caldwell and interior illustrations by Stephen Fabian, and was published by TSR in 1990 as a 160-page hardcover.

== Reception ==
In the July 1990 edition of Games International, the reviewer was not impressed, commenting "Despite the name, this AD&D hardback contains no scenarios, only a tired blend of new rules." The reviewer concluded by recommending against its purchase, saying, "If you're a Forgotten Realms completist, you'll have to have it. Otherwise, forget it."

In the October/November 1990 issue of White Wolf Magazine reviewer Lisa Stevens stated that the volume was a "hodgepodge sourcebook of information useful to the Forgotten Realms DM". She summarized that it was "well-written and will be a great aid to such DMs". Overall, Stevens gave the sourcebook an average review of 3 out of 5.

== Reviews ==
- Dosdediez (Número 4 - May/Jun 1994)

== Awards ==
At the 1991 Origins Awards, Forgotten Realms Adventures won the award for Best Roleplaying Supplement of 1990.
