= Hall of Heroes (Forgotten Realms) =

1989 tabletop role-playing game supplement

- Code: FR7
- Rules required: AD&D
- Character levels: NA
- Campaign setting: Forgotten Realms
- First published: 1989

Linked modules
- FR1 FR2 FR3 FR4 FR5 FR6 FR7 FR8 FR9 FR10 FR11 FR12 FR13 FR14 FR15 FR16

Hall of Heroes is an accessory for the Forgotten Realms campaign setting for the second edition of the Advanced Dungeons & Dragons fantasy role-playing game. The 128-page book, with product code TSR 9252, was published in 1989, with cover art by Jeff Easley and interior art by Ned Dameron.

== Contents ==
Hall of Heroes is a supplement which provides game statistics for the main characters from various Forgotten Realms adventure scenarios, novels, and comic books, with a detailed history and illustration provided for every character.

The 128-page book features a one-page introduction by Jim Lowder. The book is divided into three sections. The first section describes the major heroes of the Forgotten Realms novels, including game statistics, personal histories and background information on related characters, and role-playing hints. This section includes at least one page of description for each character, and an illustration. The characters described in this section include Adon, Alias, Bruenor Battlehammer, Cyric, Doin Sanehiro, Drizzt Do'Urden, Dragonbait, Elminster, Kelemvor, Prince Tristan Kendrick, Midnight, Robyn, Shandril Shessair, Narm Tamaraith, and Wulfgar. The second section features 48 minor characters of the setting, who had yet to play a central part in the stories at the time of publication, including game statistics, brief character histories, and role-playing tips. The third section details two adventuring brotherhoods of the setting, the Knights of Myth Drannor and the Company of Eight, including game statistics and information on each member.

== Publication history ==
FR7 Hall of Heroes was written by the TSR staff, with a cover by Jeff Easley, and was published by TSR in 1989 as a 128-page book.

The book was written by several authors, including Jeff Grubb, Kate Novak, David E. Martin, Jim Lowder, Bruce Nesmith, Steve Perrin, Mike Pondsmith, and R. A. Salvatore, each of which wrote descriptions for more than one character.

It is one of the few "FR" books which doesn't cover a geographical location. It went through three distinct printings, each of which had slight differences in the design of the cover, although the interior contents were unchanged.

Shannon Appelcline explained how the changes from 1st edition AD&D to 2nd edition AD&D impacted the Forgotten Realms publications: "It centered on a story of the gods of the Realms being thrown out of the heavens and the changes that this wrought. It began in FR7: Hall of Heroes (1989) and then spread out into a three-adventure "Avatar" series (1989), a three-novel "Avatar" series (1989), and even some of the comic book stories."
