= Dreams of the Red Wizards =

- Code: FR6
- Rules required: AD&D
- Character levels: NA
- Campaign setting: Forgotten Realms
- Authors: Steve Perrin
- First published: 1988

Linked modules
- FR1 FR2 FR3 FR4 FR5 FR6 FR7 FR8 FR9 FR10 FR11 FR12 FR13 FR14 FR15 FR16

Dreams of the Red Wizards was originally a campaign setting supplement for the Advanced Dungeons & Dragons fantasy role-playing game. Designed by Steve Perrin, it was published by TSR in 1988.

Dreams of the Red Wizards was subsequently used as a storyline title by Wizards of the Coast in various 5th Edition Dungeons & Dragons organized play programs, such as 2014 D&D Next playtest seasons and from 2019 to 2022 for Adventurers League. Dreams of the Red Wizards: Dead in Thay (2014), the focus of D&D Encounters Season 18, was also was updated and republished in the 5th Edition anthology Tales from the Yawning Portal (2017).

== Advanced Dungeons & Dragons ==
=== Contents ===
Dreams of the Red Wizards is a supplement that focuses on a nation ruled by evil wizards. It also includes a spell list exclusive to the Red Wizards of Thay.

=== Publication history ===
FR6 Dreams of the Red Wizards was written by Steve Perrin, with a cover by Clyde Caldwell, and was published by TSR in 1988 as a 64-page book with a large color map and an outer folder. The supplement was the final release in the "FR" (Forgotten Realms) series of sourcebooks. Shannon Appelcline commented that Dreams of the Red Wizards "has more crunch than most of its geographic predecessors and also includes a couple of pages of players' information, which was an innovation for the line".

This supplement developed a single region in the campaign setting. Forgotten Realms creator Ed Greenwood had previously mentioned the Red Wizards of Thay in Dragon #62 (June 1982) and Dragon #74 (June 1983). Appelcline explained that Perrin was given "Greenwood's notes about Thay and the Red Wizards, and then developed them in his own direction". While the book focused on one region, Perrin stated the supplement "was also intended 'to show how events in Thay and the surrounding countries can interact with adventures set anywhere in the Realms'".

The name can be a reference to the Chinese classic novel Dream of the Red Chamber.

== Dungeons & Dragons 5th Edition ==
=== D&D Next (2014) ===
In 2014, Seasons 17 and 18 of the organized play program D&D Encounters were respectively titled Dreams of the Red Wizards: Scourge of the Sword Coast and Dreams of the Red Wizards: Dead in Thay. These releases were part of The Sundering event for D&D Next, the Dungeons & Dragons 5th Edition playtest. While these adventures referenced the events of Ghosts of Dragonspear Castle (2013) as setup for their adventure story, the connection to specific events of The Sundering storyline were not explicit.

Scourge of the Sword Coast was written by Tito Leati, Matthew Sernett, and Chris Sims. It was published in February 2014 as the first PDF exclusive D&D Encounters book; the organized play season ran from February 19, 2014 to May 7, 2014. Unlike the previous Sundering adventures, Scourge of the Sword Coast was not system neutral; it included the D&D Next ruleset. Scott Fitzgerald Gray designed the megadungeon, Dead in Thay, for D&D Next. It featured a dynamic dungeon crawl for episodic play. Dead in Thay was designed for 6th to 8th level characters and was one of the few high level D&D Encounters adventures. Dead in Thay was published in April 2014 as a PDF exclusive; the organized play season ran from May 14, 2014 to July 23, 2014.

Dead in Thay also included two specific changes for the D&D Encounter program. First, it reintroduced the weekly encounter style that was removed in Legacy of the Crystal Shard (2013) by adding "specific encounters for the first and last week and confined plays to individual zones of a dungeon during each other week of play". Second, Dead in Thay added the Event Coordinator role which had previously been limited to convention adventures such as Vault of the Dracolich (2013). Shannon Appelcline explained that the Event Coordinator organized the interactions of one location's multiple play groups where the players were "all playing the same adventure. In Dead in Thay they might directly interact during the first and last weeks of play, but as they adventured through the dungeon, they could also change its state for subsequent parties. [...] It allowed multiple groups in a game store to all interact in a meaningful way, really taking advantage of the environment that the Encounters programs was played in".

Alex Lucard, in a review for Diehard GameFAN, did not consider Scourge of the Sword Coast as good as previous adventures for The Sundering event, however, he felt it was "better than any of the D&D Encounters pieces I've gone through in the past few years and it's definitely a better experience than most published fourth edition adventures". In a subsequent review, Lucard opined that Dead in Thay not only continued the "downward spiral" of adventure releases for The Sundering event but also "the end result is a chaotic mess that is little more than a pure hack and slash experience". Lucard argued that "because the adventure is designed for multiple parties and DMs, Dead In Thay becomes a very hard piece to even be able to play in the first place much less pull it off in a way that it will be enjoyable to all who participate".

=== Tales from the Yawning Portal (2017) ===
The Dead in Thay adventure from D&D Next was updated and republished in the 5th Edition anthology Tales from the Yawning Portal in 2017. Designer Mike Mearls commented that the original featured a "really huge dungeon and everyone who played it thought the dungeon was great, but it was kind of part of a broader campaign. We decided to just take the dungeon from Dead in Thay and place that in this book".

Cecilia D'Anastasio of Kotaku described it as "a classic 'mad wizard' map that Wizards of the Coast revamped for wider appeal". She highlighted that it has "over 100 rooms", calling it both "a creation of pure evil" and "an inspiration". Gavin Sheehan of Bleeding Cool commented that Dead in Thay is the "most recent" adventure included in the anthology and of the included adventures, it "required very little tinkering and is probably the most extensive of the group". He also noted that it is "one of the few 'search and rescue' missions you'll see these days". J.R. Zambrano, in a review for Bell of Lost Souls, wrote that the dungeon has "good pacing, a narrative to it, and some fairly challenging encounters" and it "is a good benchmark of 5th-edition design philosophy in action". Zambrano commented that "what makes this dungeon stand out is the way it models the rising alert in the complex" as the alert mechanic results in events becoming "more and more hectic as the alert level of the Doomvault rises".

=== Adventurers League (2019–2022) ===
In January 2020, a new Dreams of the Red Wizards storyline was introduced for the Dungeons & Dragons organized play program Adventurers League; this storyline included adventures released in 2019. It was a non-seasonal storyline set in the Forgotten Realms and focused on higher-level play opportunities (Tiers 2–4). Dreams of the Red Wizards consists of over 40 adventures published by either Wizards of the Coast or the Adventurers League organizer partner Baldman Games.

In September 2021, with the 11th season of Adventurers League organized play, the ongoing Dreams of the Red Wizards storyline was classified as an Event Campaign. In August 2022, Adventurers League announced that four introductory adventures would be released for the storyline in October and November 2022. These would be the final "admin-led adventure content" released on the Dungeon Masters Guild. They also announced that their organizer partner, Baldman Games, would "continue the storyline".
