= Old Empires =

1990 Dungeons & Dragons supplement

- Code: FR10
- Rules required: AD&D 2nd Edition
- Campaign setting: Forgotten Realms
- Authors: Scott Bennie
- First published: 1990

Linked modules
- FR1 FR2 FR3 FR4 FR5 FR6 FR7 FR8 FR9 FR10 FR11 FR12 FR13 FR14 FR15 FR16

Old Empires is an accessory for the fictional Forgotten Realms campaign setting for the second edition of the Advanced Dungeons & Dragons fantasy role-playing game. The book, with product code TSR 9274, was published in 1990, and was written by Scott Bennie, with cover art by Brom and interior art by Valerie Valusek.

== Contents ==
This campaign setting supplement describes the Old Empires, classical and Egyptian-style realms.

The 96-page booklet is wrapped in a removable cover. The book includes a one-page introduction, explaining that this book covers the Old Empires, three ancient kingdoms in the South of the Forgotten Realms world: Mulhorand, Unther, and Chessenta, each of which receives its own section. Pages 3–6 detail the history of the Old Empires, including a two-page timeline of important events. Pages 7–10 briefly describe the lands surrounding the Old Empires, which include Thay, Semphar and Murghôm, Aleaxtis (kingdom of the sahuagin), the Plains of Purple Dust, the Coastal Cities, Aglarond, Raurin, Durpar, Veldorn, Eastern Shaar, and Chondath. Mulhorand (pages 11–34) describes Mulhorand's people and society, geography, current economy, current politics, laws, adventures, religion, personalities, culture, and technology.

This book comes with a fold-out color poster map depicting the region. The inside front cover contains a diagram of the interior and corridors of the Pyramid of the Sceptanar, and the inside back cover contains a diagram of a chariot race track.

== Deities ==
Unlike the typical deities of the Forgotten Realms, the people of Mulhorand worship the gods of Egypt, such as Isis, Thoth, and Osiris. Unther (pages 35–49) describes Unther's people and society, geography, religion, personalities, and culture. The people of Unther primarily worship Mesopotamian gods, including Ishtar and Ramman. Chessenta (pages 50–64) describes Chessenta's people and society, geography, current economy, current politics, religion, personalities, mercenary companies, and culture. Pages 65–70 detail several short adventure scenarios appropriate for the Old Empires. Pages 71–80 detail the spells of Southern magic, a type of magic that is written in a manner that makes it undecipherable to a practitioner of standard magic. Pages 81–86 detail the magical items unique to the region. Page 87 consists of a chart to determine random encounters in Mulhorand. Pages 89–96 detail eight new monsters for the region, including the brown dragon, the dracosphinx, and the desert wraith.

== Publication history ==
FR10 Old Empires was written by Scott Bennie and published by TSR in 1990 as 96-page booklet with an outer folder.

== Reception ==
In the June 1990 edition of Games International, the reviewer thought this supplement represented "the usual TSR value for money." The reviewer criticized the lack of any included adventure, but concluded "I'm sure we'll see some full-fledged modules set there appearing soon."
