= How the Mighty Are Fallen =

Role-playing game supplement

- Rules required: 2nd edition AD&D
- Campaign setting: Forgotten Realms
- First published: 1996

How the Mighty Are Fallen is an adventure module for the 2nd edition of the Advanced Dungeons & Dragons fantasy role-playing game, published in 1996.

== Plot summary ==
How the Mighty are Fallen is an adventure intended for player characters of level 11–14, which takes place in ancient Netheril, in which the characters fight the Tarrasque, an army of undead and a golden dragon, and can try to find the lost Nether Scrolls and collect components to a spell which will kill a god.

== Publication history ==
How the Mighty are Fallen is the first adventure that was published for the Netheril: Empire of Magic set.

== Reception ==
David Comford reviewed How the Mighty Are Fallen for Arcane magazine, rating it an 8 out of 10 overall. He comments that with an adventure designed for characters of 11th-14th level, "you would expect it to be tough. It is." He also comments that the challenging encounters in the adventure would be "forcing characters to use quick thinking almost as much as their reflexes." Comford continues: "The main adventure is excellently planned, and hooks into a variety of side-encounters are well laid throughout, so that a wrong turn here or a decision not to follow a NPC there results in a variety of smaller adventures instead of the entire volume falling on its face." He adds: "The adventure works equally well whether you decide to play native Netherenese characters or present day characters. No details are given on the events leading up to the modern characters' decision to time travel back to Netheril, but there are countless reasons why players should want to, ranging from mere nostalgia to somebody willing to pay for the knowledge they will return with." Comford concludes the review by saying, "Good plot lines are well compiled with an abundance of useful maps. If you are thinking of buying Netheril: Empire of Magic then give this a good look because it's an excellent introductory adventure for the fabled kingdom."
