= Cities of Mystery =

Tabletop role-playing game accessory

- Rules required: AD&D
- Character levels: NA
- Campaign setting: Forgotten Realms
- Authors: Jean Rabe
- First published: 1989

Linked modules
- FR1 FR2 FR3 FR4 FR5 FR6 FR7 FR8 FR9 FR10 FR11 FR12 FR13 FR14 FR15 FR16

Cities of Mystery is an accessory for the Advanced Dungeons & Dragons fantasy role-playing game. It is a system for designing urban adventure settings, written by Jean Rabe and published by TSR in 1989. Along with a book and maps, the box set contains 33 full-color card stock model buildings. The book received mixed reviews from Dragon magazine, although the 3-D buildings and fold-out street layouts were highly praised.

== Contents ==
Cities of Mystery describes a city in a fantasy setting, and includes adventure scenario ideas, descriptions of significant non-player characters, two large maps and enough cardstock fold-together buildings to construct a city block.

Cities of Mystery contains four accordion sections, with each section containing the punch-out sheets needed to assemble 7–9 buildings; the buildings are printed in color on heavy construction paper. The house pieces needed for construction are pre-cut, and the buildings depicted on the sheets represent a variety of types present during the Middle Ages. The kit also contains two large mats with different floor and street plans. Each layout mat has three different floor plans which represent well developed urban areas with buildings and stone avenues, courtyards with wells and fountains, and palace grounds with more open area than buildings. Also included is a 64-page booklet of urban background and adventures.

This supplement is a system for designing fantasy role-playing game urban adventure settings, with 25mm-scale, three-dimensional, full-color, glue-together buildings and full-color, fold-out street and building layouts included in the box. The urban setting scenarios employ the 3-D buildings and street layouts. The buildings include details such as chimneys, dormers, overhanging eaves, and little roof-ridgeline stands for character miniatures that must perch on peaked roofs.

== Publication history ==
Cities of Mystery (FR8) was written by Jean Rabe, with a cover by Larry Elmore and building design by Dennis Kauth. It was published by TSR in 1989 as a boxed set with a 64-page book, cardstock sheets, and two large color maps. The set includes two full-color 22" × 34" displays, and 33 full-color card stock buildings.

== Reception ==
Robert Bigelow reviewed Cities of Mystery for Dragon magazine #152 (December 1989). Bigelow gave the product a generally positive review, saying that the models would be a boon for players who use miniatures. He felt that the package should've included a greater diversity of building styles, and that the assembly instructions were unclear. Bigelow praised the included booklet as an introduction to city-based adventures, and noted that the models would combine well with other companies' products.

Ken Rolston reviewed Cities of Mystery for Dragon magazine #156 (April 1990). He thought that the product was not well connected to the Forgotten Realms campaign setting, and felt that most of the elements of the package were bland and would provide little value to most players. The one exception was the 3-D buildings and street layouts, which Rolston described as "remarkable", and said would be useful set-dressing or props, especially for fantasy themed miniature wargaming.
