= Waterdeep and the North =

Dungeons & Dragons campaign accessory

- Code: FR1
- Rules required: AD&D
- Character levels: NA
- Campaign setting: Forgotten Realms
- Authors: Ed Greenwood
- First published: 1987

Linked modules
- FR1 FR2 FR3 FR4 FR5 FR6 FR7 FR8 FR9 FR10 FR11 FR12 FR13 FR14 FR15 FR16

Waterdeep and the North (product code FR1) is an accessory for the Dungeons & Dragons campaign setting Forgotten Realms. It was written by Ed Greenwood and published by TSR in 1987.

== Contents ==
Waterdeep and the North describes the region of northwestern Faerûn, known as "The North", particularly its leading city and port, Waterdeep. The city of Waterdeep, an integral part of Ed Greenwood's house campaign, is situated on the Sword Coast. With a population of over 100,000, it is the most important city in the north of the Forgotten Realms setting. The book provides a detailed description of Waterdeep, including its history, neighborhoods, defenses, sewers, guilds, political factions, noble families, and notable characters. The book also presents seven suggestions for adventure scenarios.

Waterdeep and the North comprises a 64-page book and a large color map of the city, wrapped in a removable six-paneled gatefold cover. The outside gatefold contains a map of Waterdeep, the inside front cover has a map of the city's known sewers, and the inside back cover has diagrams of basic floorplans that might be found throughout the city.

The book presents a brief geographical overview of the city, followed by its history. The history section describes how Waterdeep was founded by local tribes who benefited from trading timber and furs with southern merchants, and how the settlement's deep harbor gave the city its name. These were violent times: a savage human tribe captured the settlement and built defenses to fortify their new home. As tribes of humanoid monsters advanced on Waterdeep, more human tribes converged on the settlement, swelling its size and number of defenders. After savage battles, Waterdeep emerged as a free city ruled by war lords. The mage Ahghairon overthrew the last of the war lords and established a government based on wisdom instead of armed might, and he ruled the city with a group of masked lords who were secretly selected to govern. When Ahghairon died 200 years later, his rule was followed by a period of anarchy in which powerful guildmasters attempted to gain sole control of the city, but Ahghairon's surviving fellow lords ultimately reestablished the rule of the lords.

The book describes the laws and customs of the city, as well as its various guilds and factions. The book concentrates on providing a feel for life in the city, and gives descriptions for only a small number its buildings in any great detail. The book does provide a look at the workings of the city, details on its noble families, outlines of its various wards, and details on the services available. The city's guilds are detailed, including the locations of their headquarters, their livery, criteria for membership, and various interests and political connections. The book includes a number of NPCs of various levels and classes, all of whom can be used to interact with a band of adventurers as adversaries, friends, or people met during the daily routine of the city.

== Publication history ==
Waterdeep and the North (FR1) was written by Ed Greenwood, with cover art by Keith Parkinson, and interior illustrations by Chris Miller. It was published by TSR in 1987 as a 64-page booklet with a large color map and an outer folder. Editing was by Karen S. Martin, and the supplement features heraldic escutcheons by David E. Martin and cartography by Frey Graphics and David Sutherland. The City System product is intended as a companion to this volume.

According to Shannon Appelcline, Waterdeep and the North started off a long book series about the setting that helped make the Forgotten Realms "the first TSR setting that was truly and exhaustively detailed – thanks to a line of sourcebooks, rather than just adventures."

== Reception ==
Jim Bambra reviewed Waterdeep and the North for Dragon magazine #140 (December 1988). Bambra wrote that the "physical quality of this product is high, and color is used to good effect to show contour levels and sea depths", and that the book's descriptions of Waterdeep give an idea of what life is like within its boundaries "in an evocative manner which brings Waterdeep to life and makes it an ideal setting for urban adventures". He felt that the presentation of the North was less successful than that of Waterdeep, writing that while "the history of the North is colorful, the descriptions of the various settlements are sketchy", and cited the absence of a wilderness map showing the relationship of the various settlements to Waterdeep and to each other. Bambra stated that although "the section on the North is weak, the sections describing the City of Waterdeep are very strong", adding "Waterdeep has a rich background which gives the city great character. The laws and customs of the city are colorfully presented, as are the various guilds and factions of the city." He commented on how few of the city's buildings are detailed, which leaves that work up to the DM with the help of included tables and sample floor plans, and that the book instead provides "a useful look at the workings of the city, outline descriptions of its various wards, and details on the services available". He wrote that the adventure outlines provided "require a bit of work to bring them to life, but they provide a good cross section of the types of adventure available within the city". Bambra concluded by saying: "With its emphasis on atmosphere and personalities, Waterdeep is a very strong city pack. It lacks any street encounter tables, which is a pity, as this would have added even more to the city's feel and given PCs a better handle on life in the city. [...] As it stands, Waterdeep is a good urban location in which to base adventures in the Forgotten Realms setting. DMs will need to add to the provided information to personalize the city and breath life into its daily routines, but the background is provided and contains plenty of ideas just waiting to be developed."

In his review for City System in Dragon magazine #156 (April 1990), Ken Rolston also comments on Waterdeep and the North. He felt that Waterdeep and the North "presents a Forgotten Realms city on a vast scale—too vast a scale for my liking". He felt that anyone who owns and enjoys Waterdeep and the North ought to have City System as well, but that if a player had to choose between Waterdeep and the North and the more expensive City System, "by all means the former is the better deal, and all you really need; City System is only a big, colorful, and unnecessary secondary accessory to Waterdeep and the North".
