= Horde Campaign =

- Code: FR12
- Rules required: AD&D
- Character levels: NA
- Campaign setting: Forgotten Realms
- Authors: Curtis M. Scott
- First published: 1991

Linked modules
- FR1 FR2 FR3 FR4 FR5 FR6 FR7 FR8 FR9 FR10 FR11 FR12 FR13 FR14 FR15 FR16

Horde Campaign is an accessory for the Dungeons & Dragons fantasy role-playing game.

== Contents ==
Horde Campaign describes the Horde's assault on the Forgotten Realms, tracking the war battle-by-battle, and providing Battlesystem stats for the battles.

== Publication history ==
Horde Campaign was written by Curtis M. Scott and published by TSR. In its early years, it had a "major impact in TSR's Forgotten Realms setting".

== Reception ==
John Setzer reviewed Horde Campaign in the February 1992 issue of White Wolf Magazine, giving the module generally high marks for presentation. He noted that those running campaigns in the Forgotten Realms, playing the game Battlesystem, or into wargaming would find interest or utility in the module, while others would likely not. Setzer gave the game an overall average rating of 3 out of a possible 5.
