= The Shining South (1993 supplement) =

1993 tabletop role-playing game accessory

- Code: FR16
- Rules required: AD&D 2nd Edition
- Campaign setting: Forgotten Realms
- Authors: Tom Prusa
- First published: 1993

Linked modules
- FR1 FR2 FR3 FR4 FR5 FR6 FR7 FR8 FR9 FR10 FR11 FR12 FR13 FR14 FR15 FR16

The Shining South is an accessory for the fictional Forgotten Realms campaign setting for the second edition of the Advanced Dungeons & Dragons fantasy role-playing game.

== Contents ==
The 96-page booklet is wrapped in a removable gatefold cover. The book includes a one-page introduction, explaining that this book covers the region known as the Shining South, and the various countries that comprise it. Pages 3–22 detail the land of Halruaa, a rich, reclusive land famous for its magic and especially its skyships. Pages 23–41 detail the land of Dambrath, a land populated by half-drow. Pages 42–52 detail the land of Luiren, the land of the halflings. Pages 53–72 detail the lands of Durpar, Var, and Estagund, also known as the Shining Lands and a new thief-class kit. Pages 73–80 detail the land of Ulgarth. Pages 82–93 present two Shining South adventure scenarios, Gateway to Elsewhere and Dark as Dark. Pages 94–95 detail two monsters of the Shining South, the dark tree and the laraken.

This book also comes with a fold-out color poster map depicting the region. The inside front cover contains a description of Durparian specialty priests, while the inside back cover contains a list of the thirty-one leading chakas of Durpar. The inside gatefold cover contains a description of Luiren specialty priests, while the outside gatefold cover presents a color map of the city of Vaelen.

== Publication history ==
The book was written by Tom Prusa, and published by TSR. It featured cover art by Jeff Butler.

== Reception ==
John Setzer reviewed the module in White Wolf Magazine No. 41. He rated it a 3 out of a possible 5 for appearance, complexity, and value, and a 4 of 5 for concepts and playability. Overall, he rated it a 3.5 out of 5.

== See also ==
- Shining South, a 2004 supplement featuring the same fictional region for edition Dungeons & Dragons 3.5 edition
