= The Savage Frontier =

Supplement for the Forgotten Realms campaign setting

- Code: FR5
- Rules required: AD&D
- Character levels: NA
- Campaign setting: Forgotten Realms
- Authors: Jennell Jaquays (Note: Credited as Paul Jaquays.)
- First published: 1988

Linked modules
- FR1 FR2 FR3 FR4 FR5 FR6 FR7 FR8 FR9 FR10 FR11 FR12 FR13 FR14 FR15 FR16

The Savage Frontier (product code FR5) is an accessory for the Dungeons & Dragons campaign setting Forgotten Realms. It describes the Savage Frontier of Faerûn. The book was written by Jennell Jaquays and published by TSR in 1988. Cover art is by Larry Elmore, with interior illustrations by Esteban Maroto, and cartography by Dave Sutherland, Dennis Kauth, and Jaquays.

== Contents ==
The Savage Frontier is a campaign setting supplement which describes the area north of the High Moors—the location in which the novel The Crystal Shard takes place—and the northern barbarians. The book focuses on the lands to the north of the city of Waterdeep. The color maps and text add further detail to the Northlands and Trackless Sea. This campaign supplement contains information on the Northmen, the Uthgardt Barbarians, and the northern dwarves and orcs. It provides information on major settlements, strongholds, ruins, and includes adventure ideas.

The Savage Frontier is a 64-page booklet wrapped in a removable gatefold cover. The outside gatefold contains a map of Waterdeep, while the inside front cover contains maps of the Ruins of Ascore, Grandfather Tree, Hellgate Keep, Luskan, and typical Uthgardt ancestor mounds. Two fold-out color poster maps are included: one of the Savage Frontier region, and one of the Trackless Sea. The book focuses on the Savage Frontier; it includes an overview of the region and of the peoples of the North, their cities, towns, and villages, and geographic features such as the Sea, the Ice, the Islands, the Lost Lands, strongholds, ruins, rivers, mountains, rough lands, the High Forest, and Uthgardt ancestor mounds, as well as personalities of the North. The book contains four appendices which describe magical items of the Savage Frontier, northern proficiencies (skills useful in the region), news of the land, and adventures in the Savage Frontier.

== Publication history ==
The Savage Frontier (FR5) was written by Jennell Jaquays and published by TSR in 1988 as a 64-page booklet with a large color map and an outer folder.

Shannon Appelcline explained that Frank Mentzer's Aquaria setting was initially published as four adventure modules for the RPGA, and presumably to be included as part of the Greyhawk setting; after these modules were collected and reprinted as the single adventure I12: Egg of the Phoenix (1987), some of the characters appearing in the adventure were incorporated into the Forgotten Realms supplement FR5: The Savage Frontier (1988) which Appelcline found unsurprising "given the speed with which TSR was incorporating everything into the Realms at the time, from Moonshae Isles to Bloodstone Pass."

== Reception ==
Jim Bambra reviewed The Savage Frontier for Dragon magazine #144 (April 1989). Bambra wrote that the color maps and text "place firmly in context the descriptions given in FR1 Waterdeep and the North. He concluded: "This supplement is for anyone who can't resist the call of the wild."
