= Shadowdale: The Scouring of the Land =

Dungeons & Dragons adventure module

- Rules required: Dungeons & Dragons, 3.5 edition
- Character levels: 9th-13th
- Authors: Richard Baker, Eric L. Boyd, and Thomas M. Reid
- First published: 2007

Shadowdale: The Scouring of the Land is an adventure module for the 3.5 edition of the Dungeons & Dragons fantasy role-playing game.

== Plot summary ==
Shadowdale: The Scouring of the Land takes place in the Forgotten Realms setting. Zhentish soldiers, Maerimydran drow, and Sharran cultists have forged a dark alliance to subjugate the peaceful land of Shadowdale.

== Publication history ==
Shadowdale: The Scouring of the Land was published in 2007, and was written by Richard Baker, Eric L. Boyd, and Thomas M. Reid.

== Reception ==
Martin Drury of RPGamer wrote that the adventure "can be quite challenging and leave even a moderately successful party feeling the sharp steel of defeat in the end, but of course that only makes victory taste all the more sweeter."

In a retrospective review of Shadowdale: The Scouring of the Land in Black Gate, John ONeill said "The Third Edition supplement visited some epic doom on the pastoral lands of Shadowdale, subjugating it beneath the heel of a combined force of drow, Zhentish soldiers, and worse foes. Even the home of the mighty Elminster has been toppled and the PCs will need to exhibit daring and a lot of resourcefulness to drive the invaders out."
