= Empires of the Shining Sea =

- Publisher: Wizards of the Coast
- Publication date: 1988
- ISBN: 978-0786912377

Empires of the Shining Sea is a 1998 role-playing game supplement published by TSR for Advanced Dungeons & Dragons.

== Plot summary ==
Empires of the Shining Sea is a supplement which details the area of the Forgotten Realms including Calimshan and the Lake of Steam.

== Publication history ==
Empires of the Shining Sea was published in August 1998.

== Reviews ==
- InQuest #41
- Backstab #12
- Casus Belli #117
