= Ed Greenwood Presents Elminster's Forgotten Realms =

- Rules required: Dungeons & Dragons
- Character levels: N/A
- Campaign setting: Forgotten Realms
- Authors: Ed Greenwood
- First published: October 16, 2012
- ISBN: 978-0786960347

Ed Greenwood Presents Elminster's Forgotten Realms is an edition-neutral sourcebook for the Forgotten Realms published during the 4th edition of the Dungeons & Dragons role-playing game.

== Contents ==
Ed Greenwood Presents Elminster's Forgotten Realms details the Forgotten Realms from the point of view of both Ed Greenwood and his creation, Elminster the Sage of Shadowdale. In the foreword, Elminster writes:

To all who peruse this volume, these:

Well met, as always, and welcome to the latest tome from the pen of Ed of the Greenwood that purports to lay bare secrets of the world I dwell in, the place best known to ye as “the Forgotten Realms.” A world so vast and rich that its secrets could fill libraries—to say nothing of the myriad passing details of everyday life, the strivings of folk mighty and simple. Beggars and humble crofters can change the Realms as much as kings do, and its heroes are not always those lauded. Like thy world, the Realms needs splendid deeds from us all for life to hold a goodly measure of pleasures and rewards.

In short, it needs thee to make a difference.

There are six chapters in this book:

- Life in the Realms
- Laws and Orders
- Hearth and Home
- Money Matters
- Gods and Followers
- The Art

Shannon Appelcline commented that "even sections that seem like typical gaming fare aren't. Thus, the section on gods doesn't just talk about the deities that people worship, but also why the people of the Realms tolerate evil churches and how temples raise funds. The setting of Elminster's Forgotten Realms was somewhat surprising for fans. It's largely focused on life in the 1350s, before any of the changes brought on by the D&D game. Sentences here and there touch upon events as late as the 1400s, but they're mostly asides and additions, not the core of the content".

== Publication history ==
Ed Greenwood Presents Elminster's Forgotten Realms was written by Ed Greenwood and published as a hardcover book on October 16, 2012. The book was made available as a PDF or softcover book through online sources such as DriveThruRPG and DMs Guild.

Matt Morgan, for MTV News, reported that "back in January [2012] at the Dungeons & Dragons new products seminar, lead developer Mike Mearls gave fans of a preview of the D&D supplement 'Elminster's Forgotten Realms.' Mearls told the crowd that Wizards of the Coast staff approached Greenwood to ask 'why don't you take all your campaign notes, all the information you've been putting together for your campaign and lets compile it into a book? Show us the realms as you've developed it in your campaign setting and lets get that to everybody.' It's not often that fans get such an inside look at the creation of one of their favorite settings, but 'Elminster's Forgotten Realms' completely pulls back the curtain on Greenwood's design. Hitting store shelves today at 192 pages, the hardcover 'Elminster's Forgotten Realms' will retail for $39.95, and manages to cram in an impressive amount of information".

Appelcline wrote that "two months before the release of Elminster's Forgotten Realms, Menzoberranzan: City of Intrigue (2012), appeared as an edition-neutral sourcebook, marking the end of the D&D 4e era (2008-2012). This was a trend that Wizards had also following during the transition between D&D 3e and 4e (2007-2008); it was intended to keep supplements relevant even past the lifespan of a game edition. Now, Elminster's Forgotten Realms put the final nail in 4e's coffin: not only was it another edition-neutral book, but it was also the first book to do away with the D&D 4e trade dress. Its cover and interior instead mixed elegant blacks with constrained parchments — a big change from the brighter colors and plainer whites used during the D&D 4e era. [...] Elminster's Forgotten Realms was also the harbinger of another major change: a return to the Forgotten Realms".

== Reception ==
Ed Greenwood Presents Elminster's Forgotten Realms won the 2013 Silver ENnie Award for "Best Art, Interior".

Matt Morgan, for MTV News, wrote "the gritty details begin with a look at everyday life in the Realms, covering everything from the local lingo and racial viewpoints to arts and medicine. Being able to talk the talk and adopt the local customs is important for a setting populated with so many races. [...] As the book progresses, Greenwood takes many detours to expound on topics when information pertinent to a specific section of the Realms presents itself. Readers will be treated to many a sidebar that explains how life, government, families, money, religion, and magic all differ from Waterdeep to Cormyr and beyond. A common criticism of Dungeons & Dragons is that it's built for hack and slash fighting, but when a quality DM is armed with such detail as 15 pages on what a setting's denizens eat, you're going to get a true story that tells more than just combat tales. 'Elminter's Forgotten Realms' is one of the best Dungeons & Dragons books released in recent memory. This transcends the traditional splatbook, and is useful book for players in the Forgotten Realms setting and also a good read for anyone with an appreciation for fantasy world-building. [...] I can't say for certain how much of the information I learned about the Realms is brand new. [...] What I do know, though, is that "Elminster's Forgotten Realms" did a fantastic job of compiling encyclopedic information into a compelling package".

The Geeks of Doom review highlighted that "never in a hundred years did I think I would ever see such an in depth look as Ed Greenwood Presents Elminster’s Forgotten Realms. It really is a masterpiece of Ed Greenwood‘s imagination. Taken from Greenwood’s original notes from the late sixties, the Forgotten Realms were adapted in the seventies for game play with the original Dungeons & Dragons and finalized in the eighties for release with the Advanced Dungeons & Dragons game books. [...] And when I say it is full of information, I’m not kidding. This book includes everything from typical foods to economics to everyday entertainments. Covering specifics such as how to become a noble at court and individual alliances between kingdoms, it also speaks to the more mundane things like education, local judiciary systems, and clothing differences by area. There really is something here for everybody. Whether you are running a campaign in this setting or just want more reference material while reading the scores of novels set there, this is the most comprehensive compendium I have seen on the subject. [...] My favorite parts are the scribblings of Greenwood from his original notes, it’s amazing to see how far this world has come in the past four decades since he first imagined it."

Appelcline commented that "prior to the publication of Elminster's Forgotten Realms, TSR and Wizards had published four major Forgotten Realms references: the 1e Forgotten Realms Campaign Set (1987), the 2e Forgotten Realms Campaign Setting (1993), the 3e Forgotten Realms Campaign Setting (2001), and the 4e Forgotten Realms Campaign Guide (2008). They were each major overviews of the Realms … and totally unlike this new reference. If Elminster's Forgotten Realms has any predecessor, it's Ed Greenwood's own series of Volo Guides (1992-1996, 2000). Like those books, this one is all about the details of the Forgotten Realms: the small-picture Realmslore rather than the big descriptions. It's about how people live their lives, not where political boundaries are drawn. It's entirely fluff, but richly detailed fluff".
