= The Forgotten Terror =

The Forgotten Terror is a 1997 role-playing game adventure published by TSR for Advanced Dungeons & Dragons.

== Plot summary ==
The Forgotten Terror is an adventure in which the player characters must contend with Chardath Spulzeer, the insane lord of the domain of Aggarath.

== Reviews ==
- InQuest
- Backstab #7
