= Storm Riders (module) =

Dungeons & Dragons adventure module

- Code: FRA1
- Authors: Troy Denning
- First published: 1990

Storm Riders is an adventure module published in 1990 for the second edition of the Advanced Dungeons & Dragons fantasy role-playing game.

== Plot summary ==
Storm Riders is the first adventure in the "Empires Adventures Trilogy", in which the player characters are trapped by the Horde in a forbidden land and must agree to escort a princess if they want to leave.

== Publication history ==
FRA1 Storm Riders was written by Troy Denning, with a cover by Brom, and was published by TSR in 1990 as a 64-page booklet with an outer folder.

== Reception ==
In the July 1990 edition of Games International (Issue 16), the reviewer was ambivalent about this product, commenting that "diverse elements are thrown together without any thought or respect for their origins." However, the reviewer concluded on a positive note, saying, "it's a thoroughly detailed, varied module that has far more to it than just combat, and which most players should find satisfactory."
