= Castle Spulzeer =

1997 role-playing game adventure

Castle Spulzeer is a 1997 role-playing game adventure published by TSR for Advanced Dungeons & Dragons.

== Plot summary ==
Castle Spulzeer is an adventure in which the player characters must contend with a madman, a lich and a ghost at the stronghold Castle Spulzeer.

== Reviews ==
- InQuest
- Backstab #7
