= Skullport (sourcebook) =

Skullport is a 1999 role-playing game supplement published by TSR for Advanced Dungeons & Dragons.

== Contents ==
Skullport is a supplement in which a guide to Waterdeep's hidden criminal undercity explores a lawless, monster‑haunted cavern of smugglers, slavers, and shadow‑dealers ruled only by the unpredictable floating Skulls—complete with maps, factions, NPCs, and over a hundred detailed locations for use as an Underdark city in any campaign.

== Reviews ==
- Rue Morgue #12
- SF Site
