= The Horde (boxed set) =

1990 Advanced Dungeons & Dragons supplement by David Cook

- Author: David Cook
- Genre: Role-playing game
- Publisher: TSR
- Publication date: 1990
- Media type: Boxed set
- ISBN: 0-88038-868-4

The Horde is an accessory for the Advanced Dungeons & Dragons fantasy role-playing game.

== Contents ==
The Horde is a Forgotten Realms accessory which explores the land known as the Endless Waste and the nomadic people who populate it.

== Publication history ==
The Horde was written by David Cook, with a cover by Larry Elmore, and was published by TSR in 1990 as a boxed set containing two 64-page books, four large color maps, eight loose-leaf pages, 24 cardstock sheets, and a transparent map overlay.

== Reviews ==
- Casus Belli #61
