= Gateway to Ravens Bluff, The Living City =

Dungeons & Dragons adventure module

- Cover art by Keith Parkinson
- Code: LC1
- Authors: RPGA member submissions compiled by Jean Rabe and edited by Skip Williams and Ed Sollers
- First published: 1989

Linked modules
- Living City

Gateway to Ravens Bluff, The Living City is a supplement published by the RPGA in 1989 for their new Living City shared campaign world set in the Forgotten Realms using the second edition of the fantasy role-playing game Advanced Dungeons & Dragons.

== Contents ==
Gateway to Ravens Bluff details the town of Ravens Bluff and its history, as well as the government of the city, the local army, the justice system and the major temples. Seventeen of the most notable residents are profiled, and various businesses likely to be visited by player characters are also included.

Four short introductory adventures are outlined, designed to introduce players to the various neighborhoods of the city.

== Publication history ==
RPGA was the tournament division of TSR, and had been quite popular in the early 1980s. By 1987, in the face of decreasing membership as D&D tournaments fell out of fashion, RPGA introduced a "shared" campaign setting called "Living City" that was set in the city of Ravens Bluff. RPGA members could submit their own material to be used by everyone. Some of these submissions were shared through a series of supplements; the first in the series was LC1 Gateway to Ravens Bluff, The Living City. Members' submissions were compiled into a 68-page softcover book by Jean Rabe, and edited by Skip Williams and Ed Sollers, with cover art by Keith Parkinson, interior art by Angela Bostick, Timothy Bradstreet and Rick Lowry, and cartography by Guy Mclimore and Valerie Valusek. It was published by TSR under the RPGA imprint in 1989, but was only sold to RPGA members via mail for the first year. It was offered for sale to the public in 1990.

== Reception ==
In his 2023 book Monsters, Aliens, and Holes in the Ground, RPG historian Stu Horvath disparaged the cover art of the entire Living City series of books, saying, "The covers are surprisingly second rate for what amounted to a new and exciting way to play D&D." Horvath specifically called out Keith Parkinson's cover art of Gateway to Ravens Bluff, saying, "Despite being set in the Forgotten Realms, the cover of the first book is a re-purposed painting of Caramon and Raistlin Majere, heroes from the Dragonlance setting, and it isn't even one of Keith Parkinson's best."
