= Volo's Guide to Waterdeep =

Advanced Dungeons & Dragons accessory

- Genre: Role-playing games
- Publisher: TSR
- Publication date: 1993

Volo's Guide to Waterdeep is an accessory for the 2nd edition of the Advanced Dungeons & Dragons fantasy role-playing game, published in 1993.

== Contents ==
The 240-page pocket-sized module is the 4th Forgotten Realms product to describe the city of Waterdeep in detail. According to John Setzer, it is "packed with information on the City of Splendors, from the finest inn to the most dangerous alley".

== Publication history ==
Volo's Guide to Waterdeep was written by Ed Greenwood and published by TSR.

== Reception ==
John Setzer reviewed the module in a 1993 issue of White Wolf Magazine. He advised that "DMs who use Waterdeep in their Campaigns will really benefit from this product", noting "the potential to add so much [Forgotten] Realms flavor to a campaign that it could well be a campaign-saver for stagnant games". Overall, he rated the product a 4 out of a possible 5.
