= Waterdeep: Dragon Heist =

Tabletop role-playing game supplement

- Rules required: Dungeons & Dragons, 5th edition
- Character levels: 1-5
- Campaign setting: Forgotten Realms
- First published: 18 September 2018
- Pages: 256

Waterdeep: Dragon Heist is an adventure module for the 5th edition of the Dungeons & Dragons fantasy role-playing game. It is the first part of the Waterdeep storyline and followed by a second adventure, Waterdeep: Dungeon of the Mad Mage.

== Plot summary ==
Volothamp Geddarm sets the adventurers off on an urban-themed treasure hunt for a massive hoard of gold within the city of Waterdeep. Depending on the Dungeon Master's choice of season, the adventurers will ultimately face off with one or more of the following villains: Manshoon the Manyfaced, Jarlaxle Baenre, Xanathar the Beholder, and/or the Cassalanters (Lord Victoro and Lady Ammalia Cassalanter).

Chris Perkins, Lead Designer of Waterdeep: Dragon Heist, stated that the adventure module takes place in "1492 DR, the Year of Three Ships Sailing".

== Publication history ==
The new module was announced in June 2018 during the Stream of Many Eyes livestreamed event on the Wizards of the Coast's Twitch site. Waterdeep: Dragon Heist was released on September 18, 2018 as part of the fantasy storyline "Waterdeep". Beadle & Grimm, a Wizards of the Coast licensee, released a limited run special "Platinum Edition" of Waterdeep: Dragon Heist which came in a wood storage box. It included the book broken into individual booklets for each chapter, physical props (such as coins, brooches and tea stained in-world letters), a custom Dungeon Master's screen for this book, more than twenty unpainted WizKids miniatures, encounter cards, and other handouts (such as maps and setting art).

Waterdeep: Dragon Heist is also available as a digital product through the following Wizards of the Coast licensees: D&D Beyond, Fantasy Grounds, and Roll20.

== Reception ==
For Polygon, Charlie Hall wrote that Waterdeep: Dragon Heist "gives gaming groups a foothold in the city itself early on, a place that adventurers can eventually come to call home. This adventure also provides flexibility. If the players or the DM aren't smitten with the villain they've chosen it's a simple matter to swap them out for another, or to simply roll the clock forward to the next season that suits their mood. [...] In the end, Dragon Heist is more than just an adventure. It's one of the best introductions to D&D that I've ever come across, and a fantastic vehicle for familiarizing players with one of the biggest cities on the continent that the original role-playing game now calls home".

Christian Hoffer, for Comicbook, wrote that "Dragon Heist is a great introduction for newcomers, as it provides a huge setting ripe for exploration and tons of activities that don't involve wanton violence. Waterdeep is a city of laws and the punishment for breaking those rules can be harsh. Not only will this break new players of any 'murder hobo' tendencies, it also encourages players to find inventive solutions to the problems they'll encounter. The strength of Waterdeep: Dragon Heist is its four variant storylines, each of which have wildly different themes and motivations. [...] There are a couple of weaknesses in Dragon Heist that might leave some veteran players disappointed or underwhelmed. Despite its title, Dragon Heist is more of a treasure hunt than a heist. The story is more National Treasure than Ocean's 11, and some might feel misled based on how the book was promoted".

Benjamin Bigelow, for SLUG Magazine, wrote that "in Waterdeep, as with any D&D adventure, not everything on the surface is what it seems. The players quickly discover that two underworld factions are on the cusp of an all-out street war, and even the well-equipped City Watch is having a rough time keeping the peace. [...] It's like the Sharks and the Jets, but with way less dancing and a shitload more short swords and Magic Missile spells. [...] A good deal of the trouble my players experienced early-game stemmed from the sheer size and thoroughness of the city lore. With a place so compelling and beautiful, it's hard to get a group to sit in a darkened tavern corner long enough to incite the action. Some of that burden belongs to me as a slipshod DM with a day job, but in the future, I'm still keen on running my brand new players through The Lost Mines of Phandelver to let them get a feel for the world. Waterdeep is definitely more suited as an adventure for seasoned players looking to make a fresh start in a familiar setting".

For Paste, Cameron Kunzelman wrote that "for being an adventure that is fundamentally about changeability, the opening sections of Dragon Heist seem very on-rails. The players are in Waterdeep, they get into a brawl, there's a sort-of dungeon delve, and things are basically linear until a fireball rips through their part of the city and the rush to discover the hoard of treasure gets going. [...] Dragon Heist mostly seems written to keep players in bounds and on the track toward the things the adventure wants to reveal to them. There are even factions, with faction-specific sidequests, to make sure that the party can go do additional work that still keeps them in the 'universe' of Waterdeep, its political machinery, and the characters that run that machine. There's not a lot of room to escape what the adventure has planned for you. From a Dungeon Master's perspective, I think the only thing that might get in the way of having a good time with this book is that there are quite a few moments of 'if X is the villain, then Y,' and I think if I ran it that I might have to copy pages of this book, slice out the parts that did not fit the villain I chose, and then reassemble them in a folder. After all, there are hidden criminal conspiracies afoot, and they can get complicated".

Kody Keplinger, for The Mary Sue, wrote that in regards of changing demographics in Dungeons & Dragons that "this shift, making D&D more welcoming to non-straight-white-male players, is by no means an accident. With the game's fifth edition, it's clear that D&D publisher Wizards of the Coast has been making an effort to foster a diverse community around the game, both in its outreach and in its published materials. This feels most apparent in its most recent modules. In Waterdeep: Dragon Heist, a non-player character shopkeeper uses they/them pronouns and politely corrects player characters if they're misgendered. In the followup module, Waterdeep: Dungeon of the Mad Mage, player characters may encounter an NPC whom they can aid in returning to her wife (who happens to be an NPC from an earlier module.) These are only two examples of many, and while they may seem small on the surface, these subtle efforts to populate The Forgotten Realms—D&D's most popular campaign setting—with queer characters can be quite meaningful to a community starved for representation in these geeky spaces".
