= Gold & Glory =

1992 role-playing game accessory

- Genre: Role-playing games
- Publisher: TSR
- Publication date: 1992

Gold & Glory is an accessory for the 2nd edition of the Advanced Dungeons & Dragons fantasy role-playing game, published in 1992.

== Contents ==
The Gold & Glory product provides additional information on mercenaries in the AD&D's Forgotten Realms. It provides information on thirty mercenary groups "from small gatherings to veritable armies". The book also provides a significant amount of general history for the Forgotten Realms, making the work useful as a reference for any dungeon master running a related campaign.

== Publication history ==
The module was written by Tim Beach and published by TSR.

== Reception ==
John Setzer reviewed Gold & Glory in a 1993 issue of White Wolf Magazine, stating that it was a "well-written, well-developed accessory for DMs of the Forgotten Realms", noting that what it brought to a campaign made it "worth the price". Setzer gave it an overall average rating of 3 out of a possible 5.
