= Elminster's Ecologies Appendix I: The Battle of Bones / Hill of Lost Souls =

- Genre: Role-playing game
- Publisher: TSR
- Publication date: 1995
- Media type: Print
- Pages: 72

Elminster's Ecologies Appendix I: The Battle of Bones / Hill of Lost Souls is a supplement to the 2nd edition of the Advanced Dungeons & Dragons fantasy role-playing game.

== Contents ==
Elminster's Ecologies Appendix I is a sequel to the Elminster's Ecologies box for the Forgotten Realms setting, which focuses on the flora and fauna of the Battle of Bones and Hill of Lost Souls. It includes such encounters as the zombie ferret, lava ankheg, and dead grass snake, and also in-game recipes for ruby blushrose potpourri and firebush spice paste. The package also includes a 5-page encounter booklet.

== Publication history ==
Elminster's Ecologies Appendix 1 was written by Scott Davis and Donald J. Bingle, and published by TSR, Inc.

== Reception ==
Rick Swan reviewed Elminster's Ecologies Appendix 1 for Dragon magazine #221 (September 1995). He calls this package "charming", and concludes that "Whimsical asides and grumpy narration [...] makes this as fun as a fairy tale. They could have cut the 5-page encounter booklet, though, which is long on pretty pictures but short on useful information."

== Reviews ==
- Backstab #9
