= The Magister =

1988 tabletop role-playing game supplement

- Code: FR4
- Rules required: AD&D
- Character levels: NA
- Campaign setting: Forgotten Realms
- Authors: Ed Greenwood, Steve Perrin
- First published: 1988

Linked modules
- FR1 FR2 FR3 FR4 FR5 FR6 FR7 FR8 FR9 FR10 FR11 FR12 FR13 FR14 FR15 FR16

The Magister is an accessory for the Forgotten Realms campaign setting of the first edition Advanced Dungeons & Dragons fantasy role-playing game. The book, with product code TSR 9229, was published in 1988 by TSR. It was written by Ed Greenwood and Steve Perrin, with cover art by Jeff Easley and interior art by Valerie Valusek.

== Contents ==
The Magister is a supplement which details magic items and spells unique to the Forgotten Realms setting, and presents rules for characters to craft magic items, tables for randomly generating magic items as treasure, and game statistics for new magic items. Elminster, a fictional wizard, narrates the book, presenting detailed descriptions and history, in addition to game mechanics for magic. Descriptions of spells are detailed clearly, along with descriptions and history of the magical tomes which hold these spells. The supplement provides lore and descriptions of magical armor, clothing, rings, wands, weapons, and miscellaneous magical items, as well as a short section on how to create magic items.

The 64-page book includes a one-page foreword and introduction by Ed Greenwood, which outlines the subject of the book—new spells and magic items—and cites Pages From The Mages, a series of articles from Dragon magazine in which some of the content had previously appeared. "How To Use This Book", an article by Steve Perrin, explains how the book can be useful to both Dungeon Masters and players. The book details magical books of the Realms, each of which has its own unique properties and contains a number of spells. The spells themselves are elaborated by means of a chart which lists them by level, name, spell school, and which spellbook they may be found in. The book describes a variety of magic items unique to the Realms, including magic armor, clothing, miscellaneous magic items, potions, rings, rods, staves, and wands, unique swords, and other weapons. It details various methods by which characters may create magic items. The book's inside front cover contains a table for randomly determining magical treasure found in this book, and the inside back cover details saving throws involved in creating magical items.

== Publication history ==
The Magister (FR4) was written by Ed Greenwood and Steve Perrin, with a cover by Jeff Easley. It was published by TSR in 1988 as a 64-page book.

== Reception ==
Ken Rolston reviewed The Magister for Dragon magazine #147 (July 1989). He calls The Magister "a superior treatment of AD&D game magic at its best". He wrote that the style of presentation in The Magister is similar to that of the magical tomes of the original Forgotten Realms Campaign Set—"one of the best features of that product." Rolston found the tone of the presentation appealing, and stated that the new spells were "imaginative and colorful, with neat twists on standard spell effects that promise to be useful in play without inflating or disrupting the balance of power established in the 1st Edition Players Handbook magic spells". Regarding the new magical items, he called them "useful and are not simply handy power tools for popping open monsters. The tweaking of game effects and advantages is subtle and imaginative." He stated that the section on creating magical items "offers some interesting rationalizations and elaborations of the standard rules for item creation. The ideas are faithful to the basic rules, with some useful original interpretations of the limits of the powers of certain items." Rolston concluded that "The Magister is a good example of the best that AD&D game magic can produce. The virtues are mostly in the trappings—the descriptive bits, the colorful effects, and the histories and legends attached to the spells and items. I recommend it to gamers who'd like to punch up the style and texture of the magic in their AD&D campaigns.
