= Black Courser =

Dungeons & Dragons adventure module

- Code: FRA2
- Authors: Troy Denning
- First published: 1990

Black Courser is an adventure module published in 1990 for the second edition of Advanced Dungeons & Dragons fantasy role-playing game.

== Plot summary ==
Black Courser is an adventure in which the player characters search for a lost city to obtain an artifact to free the Purple Dragon so that the characters can overcome an evil raja.

== Publication history ==
FRA2 Black Courser was written by Troy Denning, with a cover by Brom, and was published by TSR in 1990 as a 32-page book, an 8-page booklet, and an outer folder.
