= Forgotten Realms Campaign Setting =

Dungeons & Dragons sourcebook

The original 1987 edition of the Forgotten Realms Campaign Set

The Forgotten Realms Campaign Setting is a role-playing game sourcebook first published by TSR in 1987 for the first edition of the fantasy role-playing game Advanced Dungeons & Dragons that describes the campaign setting of the Forgotten Realms. It contains information on characters, locations and history. Various revised and updated editions have been produced over the years.

== 1st edition ==
=== Contents ===
The 1987 Forgotten Realms Campaign Set was sold as a box set containing two 96-page books, four maps, and two clear plastic overlays marked with hex grids. The maps were four full-color, 34" x 22" maps, two of which combine to form a large-scale (1" = 90 miles) map of the western half of the vast Realms continent, while the other two provide a more detailed (1" = 30 miles) map of the regions featured in the campaign pack.

The Dungeon Master's Sourcebook of the Realms describes how to set up and run a campaign in the Forgotten Realms. A pair of short scenarios is included, and information is provided on terrain and movement in the wilderness, important non-player character personalities, rumors, as well as important and magical books. Written from the perspective of Elminster the sage, the book introduces the campaign setting, explains how to use it, and offers adventure resources. Large areas were set aside to be developed for house campaigns, and no published materials were intended to be printed to exploit those areas, while one area detailed in this package was intended to have no subsequent publications use that area. The package covers only the western half of a single continent; the eastern half would later be covered in a separate sourcebook for Kara-Tur. Two complete dungeon-style adventures are provided: "Halls of the Beast-Tamers", a dungeon with many unconventional problem-solving exercises, and "Lashan's Fall", a dungeon with a mystery and an opportunity to parley with a monster. The "Books of the Forgotten Realms" section is a treatment of several magical tomes that suggests a variety of adventures, with a description of the appearance, history, and contents of each book.

The Cyclopedia of the Realms contains background information on and detailed maps for the locations featured in the maps of the Forgotten Realms that come with the set. It begins with an explanation of the Realms' treatment of time, names, language, and currency, and its gods and religion. The remaining 75 pages of the book is an encyclopedic and alphabetic listing of important places, races, nations, cultures, character classes, and organizations of the Realms.

=== Publication history ===
Ed Greenwood and Jeff Grubb collaborated beginning in 1986 to turn Greenwood's Forgotten Realms campaign setting into a publishable product for the public. Greenwood sent in packages filled with raw material, maps, and notes to Grubb. Grubb then organized and rewrote much of the material, and Karen Martin edited it. Their combined work created the Forgotten Realms Campaign Set that was published in 1987. It featured illustrations and artwork from Keith Parkinson, Jeff Easley, Clyde Caldwell, and Tim Conrad.

== 2nd edition ==
In 1990, TSR published Forgotten Realms Adventures, a 154-page sourcebook that was a revision and upgrade to the 1st edition Campaign Set for the newly published 2nd edition rules.

TSR published a full new version of the boxed set for AD&D 2nd edition in 1993, the Forgotten Realms Campaign Setting, Revised. It was later republished in 1996. Contents included:

- "A Grand Tour of the Realms" – 128-page perfect-bound book describing the geographical regions of Faerûn
- "Shadowdale" – 96-page book on the town of Shadowdale including the adventure "Beneath the Twisted Tower".
- "Running the Realms" – 64-page book describing suggested ideas for running a campaign in the Realms
- 8 Monstrous Compendium pages, 6 card-stock accessory sheets, 4-fold out maps, 2 transparent hex-grid overlays for use with the maps

== 3rd edition ==
The Forgotten Realms Campaign Setting was published in June 2001. Wizards of the Coast published an updated version for use with the 3rd edition of the Dungeons & Dragons role-playing game. Due to difficulties with distribution and production costs of box sets, Wizards moved away from that style, and instead published a normal hardcover book for the 3rd edition update to the Realms. The book was written by Ed Greenwood, Sean K. Reynolds, Skip Williams and Rob Heinsoo, with additional contributions from members of the Wizard company's staff. Interior art was by Todd Lockwood, Sam Wood, Matt Wilson, Carlo Arellano and Stephanie Pui-Mun Law. The book is 320 pages in length and features color illustrations.

=== Contents ===
Notable updates to the campaign setting included the widespread presence of Red Wizard enclaves in various cities, the presence of a mysterious group called the "Shades" in the southern Anauroch desert, and the increasing "surface presence" of dark elves in the Dalelands. The setting history was updated to reflect various major events such as the changes to the pantheon of Faerûn since the Time of Troubles, and the defeat of the Tuigan Horde.

The book was organized into nine chapters, which cover the campaign setting in broad detail. The primary emphasis is on the continent of Faerûn, and the other continents are only briefly mentioned. The chapters are arranged as follows:

1. Characters — How to create a player character for the setting, including races, classes, regional feats, religions, and setting-specific prestige classes. Many of these later have been merged into the version 3.5 release of Dungeons & Dragons Dungeon Master's Guide.
2. Magic – An explanation of how magic operates in this setting, and a number of unique aspects of magic. A few additional spells are provided, primarily to support the new Domains.
3. Life in Faerûn – A general overview of life, lore, culture and commerce in this setting.
4. Geography – Each of the significant regions of the continent are explored, along with places of interest, cities, politics, and significant individuals.
5. Deities – Only the major deities are described in this edition, with the remainder of the pantheon detailed in Faiths & Pantheons. Several new Domains are introduced, with the incumbent spells listed in the Magic chapter.
6. History – An overview of the detailed history of this setting, with a lengthy time line at the end of the chapter.
7. Organizations – Groups, cults, and other organizations play an important role in the realms, and several of the most significant are detailed herein.
8. Running the Realms – Practical advice for the Dungeon Master trying to run an adventure or campaign in this setting. A pair of brief sample adventures are included.
9. Monsters – A brief list of monsters unique to this continent are introduced, with a more extensive selection published later in other books.

This work contained a number of maps, and a fold-out map of the continent of Faerûn. There were also many sidebar topics and tables. Game statistics were provided for popular Forgotten Realms characters such as Drizzt Do'Urden, Artemis Entreri, Elminster, Khelben Blackstaff, Fzoul Chembryl and Manshoon.

== 4th edition ==
Wizards of the Coast released another revised edition of the Forgotten Realms Campaign Guide for the 4th edition of D&D in August 2008, and also released the Forgotten Realms Player's Guide in September 2008.

To usher in the new edition of Dungeons & Dragons, major campaign world events included the death of the goddess Mystra and her Weave, and the subsequent Spellplague, which caused calamitous events such as animation of giant statues, violent earthquakes, corruption of various beings into monsters, and the collapse of some regions of the Underdark.

An additional campaign setting book, covering the city of Neverwinter and its environs, was released in 2011, while an overview of the history, both fictional and real-world, of the Realms was published as Ed Greenwood Presents Elminster's Forgotten Realms in 2012, written by Realms creator Ed Greenwood.

== 5th edition ==
The following Forgotten Realms books were released for the 5th edition of D&D:

- Sword Coast Adventurer's Guide (2015)
- Tomb of Annihilation (2017)
- Waterdeep: Dragon Heist (2018)
- Baldur's Gate: Descent into Avernus (2019)
- Icewind Dale: Rime of the Frostmaiden (2020)
- Forgotten Realms: Heroes of Faerûn (2025)
- Forgotten Realms: Adventures in Faerûn (2025)

== Reception ==
Despite being a creative and critical success, sales of the Campaign Setting in the 1980s and 1990s were not large in raw numbers. This was partially due to how only a Dungeon Master might need to buy the setting for an entire playgroup, while all the players might own a Players' Handbook, and anyone could buy the popular Forgotten Realms novels with no need to even participate in AD&D. The 1987 Campaign Set sold around 80,000 copies in its first year, and around 207,000 total sales before 1999; the 1990 Adventures supplement handbook sold around 82,000 in its first year, and 116,000 sales before 1999; and the 1993 2nd edition box set sold around 36,000 copies in its first year, and 107,000 copies by 1999. These sales were worse than both Dragonlance Adventures and World of Greyhawk Fantasy Game Setting that had been published earlier, perhaps a sign of increasing competition in the role-playing game market compared to the early 1980s when Dungeons & Dragons was by far the pre-eminent role-playing game.

Lawrence Schick, in his 1991 book Heroic Worlds, describes the Forgotten Realms as a "fantasy world with a little bit of everything in it, the setting for most of TSR's AD&D scenarios from 1987 on. The world is designed to be flexible enough to act as a setting for a wide variety of campaigns."

The reviewer from Pyramid noted that the third edition book covers "a vast land with knights, barbarians, horse archers, and just about any other type of fantasy archetype you can name".

Scott Taylor for Black Gate in 2014 listed Forgotten Realms Boxed Set by Keith Parkinson as #6 in The Top 10 TSR Cover Paintings of All Time.

In his 2023 book Monsters, Aliens, and Holes in the Ground, RPG historian Stu Horvath noted, "After the box is opened, the first thing that is apparent about Forgotten Realms is how massive the world is ... Large portions of the world are left for the GM to fill in with their own material, while the rest is detailed by Greenwood and company with an eye towards giving players and GMs a little bit of everything."

== Other reviews ==
- Envoyer (German) (Issue 23 - Sep 1998)
- Asgard Issue 1 (April 2001)
- Envoyer Issue 57 (July 2001)
- Anduin Issue 88 (July 2004)
- Rebel Times Issue 27 (December 2009, Polish edition, "(Nie)zapomniane Krainy") [in Polish]
- Backstab #4 (2nd edition)
- Australian Realms #13
- Backstab #32
- Backstab #39
- Dragão Brasil #1 [in Portuguese]
- Dragão Brasil #13
- Dragão Brasil #75
- Dragão Brasil #92
- Realms of Fantasy

== Awards ==
- The 1st edition boxed set is a Gamer's Choice award-winner.
- At the 2002 Origins Award, the 3rd edition of Forgotten Realms Campaign Setting won Best Role-Playing Game Supplement of 2001.

== Other recognition ==
- The third edition of Forgotten Realms Campaign Setting made the Amazon.ca bestseller list at number 47 in September 2002.
- A copy of the third edition of Forgotten Realms Campaign Setting is held in the collection of the Strong National Museum of Play (object 116.6072).

== See also ==
- List of Forgotten Realms modules and sourcebooks
