= The Return of Randal Morn =

Dungeons & Dragons adventure module

- Character levels: 1-4
- Campaign setting: Forgotten Realms
- Authors: Jim Butler
- First published: 1996

The Return of Randal Morn is an adventure module for the 2nd edition of the Advanced Dungeons & Dragons fantasy role-playing game, published in 1996.

== Plot summary ==
The Return of Randal Morn is an adventure in which the player characters must rescue the kidnapped Randal Morn.

== Publication history ==
The Return of Randal Morn was designed by Jim Butler, and published by TSR in 1996. The cover art was by Bruce Eagle with the graphic design cover by Renee Ciske, and interior art by Elizabeth T. Danforth.

== Reception ==
Trenton Webb reviewed The Return of Randal Morn for Arcane magazine, rating it a 2 out of 10 overall. According to Webb, "Return is suitable only for players of limited imagination and a fondness for spoon feeding. Its strictly linear plot drags players brutally between set-pieces, the outcome of which is usually entirely beyond their control. The characters they meet are sad, two-dimensional collections of statistics held together by names, while the unremittingly tedious world they can explore is peopled by such fearsome beasts as orcs and - gasp - humans!" He also bleakly describes the plot as the party sets out to rescue Randal Morn and "wanders around the woods and gets beaten up a bit. Then they wander around a town and get beaten up a lot. A wagon crashes. The good guys beat up the bad guys. The end." Webb felt that the designer failed to offer a proper scope to the adventure, by not allowing it to be flexible so that it could be shaped to suit the party playing it, or pulling the players along with plot tidbits while giving the Dungeon Master the power to push them. He criticized that the adventure enforces its will on the characters with "edicts" where actions come to the same result regardless of how cautious the player characters are, which "directly discourages creative play". He calls the scenario's encounters "unfortunately mundane", with the party "repeatedly facing large groups of humans and orc warriors. As a result the battles are usually drawn out slugging matches." Webb concludes the review by saying: "Return works as a scenario but not as an adventure. It's functional rather than fun, sort of painting by numbers without the creative bits."

== Reviews ==
- Casus Belli #117
