= Elminster's Ecologies Appendix II: The High Moor / The Serpent Hills =

- Genre: Role-playing game
- Publisher: TSR
- Publication date: 1995
- Media type: Print

Elminster's Ecologies Appendix II: The High Moor / The Serpent Hills is a supplement to the 2nd edition of the Advanced Dungeons & Dragons fantasy role-playing game.

== Contents ==
Elminster's Ecologies Appendix II: The High Moor / The Serpent Hills is a campaign expansion set that contains two booklets which describe the ecologies of two locations nearby each other in the Forgotten Realms setting. This information is presented from the perspective of two non-player characters: Bara, a female druid from the High Moor, details the living things in her desolate land; the other is Lark of Suzail, a female mage with a phobia of snakes, details the same in the Serpent Hills. The supplement presents information on the geography, weather, plants, and animals of each area, as well as information of the monsters that live there, such as how they organized themselves, and what relationships exist between the tribes. The High Moor is populated by some humanoid groups, along with trolls, undead, and dragons, while the Serpent Hills are populated by reptilian creatures. The supplement presents encounter tables but provides no game statistics, and each booklet finished with a section of rumors and legends.

== Publication history ==
Elminster's Ecologies Appendix II: The High Moor / The Serpent Hills was published by TSR, Inc. in 1995.

== Reception ==
Cliff Ramshaw reviewed Elminster's Ecologies Appendix II: The High Moor / The Serpent Hills for Arcane magazine, rating it a 5 out of 10 overall. Ramshaw complains that the two NPC personalities are "enforced on the text" with "crudity", which "makes it heavy going in places, but no less informative for that". He felt that the ruins and dungeons hinted at in the rumors and legends sections, which were left for the referee to fill out, were "all very well", but wondered if "wouldn't it have been better to have more of this sort of thing and less about the different varieties of grass in the area?"
