= Halls of Undermountain =

Adventure for the 4th edition of Dungeons & Dragons

Halls of Undermountain is an adventure for the 4th edition of the Dungeons & Dragons role-playing game.

== Contents ==
Halls of Undermountain details the mega-dungeon of Undermountain that lies beneath the city of Waterdeep which is the lair of the insane wizard Halaster Blackcloak. There are 13 sections in this book:

- Introduction
- History of Undermountain
- Ways In and Out
- Yawning Portal Patrons and Hands
- Adventures in Undermountain
- Combing the Adventures
- Zarr's Invincible Army
- Tombs of Dayan
- Scaly Doom
- Rutherford Wrap-Up
- Infamous Areas
- Monsters of Undermountain
- Appendix: Monster Statistics

Shannon Appelcline, the author of Designers & Dragons, wrote "Halls of Undermountain is entirely reliant upon the Monster Vault (2010) supplement for Essentials: the adventure contains no monster stats, except for its new beasties. [...] Halls of Undermountain broke the mold for 4e adventure. Previously, they'd all been focused on two-page encounter spreads that presented combat encounters in high fidelity. [...] The formatting of Halls of Undermountain is very old school, detailing rooms one-by-one, even including read-aloud text for the players. [...] These sections combine the three dungeon delves into the story of an adventuring company gone missing. [...] The biggest expansion that occurs in Halls of Undermountain is its explanation of how the Spellplague affected the dungeon. Beyond that it provides extensive detail on the Yawning Portal (one of the most famous entries to the dungeon) as well as level 1 of the dungeon. In all, about 80 areas in the dungeon are detailed".

== Publication history ==
Halls of Undermountain was written by Matt Sernett with Shawn Merwin, and was the final adventure for 4th edition Dungeons & Dragons to be published and distributed by Wizards of the Coast. It was originally released in April 2012 as a 96-page hardcover book with two poster maps and then later released as a PDF. The massive poster of Undermountain included with the book was created by Mike Schley.

Appelcline wrote "Halls of Undermountain was supposed to be a boxed release like its immediate predecessor, Madness at Gardmore Abbey (2011), . The original plan was to include a 32-page "Dungeon Components" book, a 64-page "Adventure" book, a variety of tokens and dungeon dressings, a half-dozen original miniatures, some cards, and a pair of double-sided maps. Though boxes are expensive, the designers were assured that the project could be brought in at a retail price of $40. Then the cost cutting began. First some of the original miniatures were replaced with "pick-ups" from old sets, then all of them were. Then the number of painting steps on the miniatures had to be reduced. Then the miniatures were cut entirely. Then the token sheets were reduced from three to two. Then the box and the rest of the token sheets were cut entirely. In the end, the two booklets were combined into one 96-page hardcover book and the maps were glued into the back. The price was reduced to $30 ... but one of the main complaints ended up being that it was still overpriced".
