= Undermountain: Maddgoth's Castle =

Dungeons & Dragons adventure module

- Genre: Role-playing games
- Publisher: TSR
- Publication date: 1996

Undermountain: Maddgoth's Castle is an adventure module for the 2nd edition of the Advanced Dungeons & Dragons fantasy role-playing game, published in 1996.

== Publication history ==
Undermountain: Maddgoth's Castle was published by TSR, Inc. in 1996.

== Plot summary ==
Undermountain: Maddgoth's Castle is an adventure which takes place in an area of Undermountain, where the dangerous wizard Maddgoth has constructed a magically shrunken fortress to hide his hoard of stolen spellbooks and the player characters need to take back as much as they can.

== Reception ==
Trenton Webb reviewed Undermountain: Maddgoth's Castle for Arcane magazine, rating it a 5 out of 10 overall. He quipped that "The nostalgia boom continues unabated with platform shoes, 8-bit computer games and the Dungeon Crawl adventures. TSR's new series transports players back to the first 'great dungeon' of Undermountain in a bash that stresses action above subtlety." Webb commented on how "The players' task is to break and nick as much as they can carry. This very possible mission is made a little less appealing for three simple reasons. The first of these is that Maddgoth's Castle exists within shrunken reality, and to enter it players must be reduced to the size of mice. A matter of scale that's emphasised by the presence of creatures within the castle that haven't been reduced, so even the most mundane monsters become terrible menaces." He continued: "The second issue is that of the retro feel. Players who have only gamed in the more recent and sophisticated realms are in for a shock because the entire Monstrous Compendium is hurled at them. There's no overall theme or elegant ecosystem because the monsters here just play up the dungeon's puzzles or catch the party unawares." He added: "The third and most fatal problem for the party is that control of Maddgoth's Castle is currently being disputed by two powerful forces, who are both seeking the same prize as the party." Webb concluded his review by saying, "The resultant package proves a little too disjointed and fatal to be that much fun, It accurately maintains a retro feel but lacks the focus of the Lost Level - the previous Dungeon Crawl outing. The plot's got too many twists to be a 'classic' treasure trawl and the situations are too old-fashioned to satisfy modern garners."
