= Netheril: Empire of Magic =

Role-playing game supplement

- Cover
- Genre: Role-playing games
- Publisher: TSR
- Publication date: 1996

Netheril: Empire of Magic is an accessory for the 2nd edition of the Advanced Dungeons & Dragons fantasy role-playing game, published in 1996.

== Contents ==
Netheril: Empire of Magic is a boxed set expansion to the Forgotten Realms setting which describes the long-lost ancient kingdom of Netheril, formed about 5,000 years ago, which excelled in usage of magic to the point of even stealing power from the gods before the kingdom fell. Player characters can travel back through time to ancient Netheril, or players can create characters native to the Netherese time period.

== Publication history ==
Netheril: Empire of Magic was published by TSR, Inc. in 1996 as a boxed set.

== Reception ==
David Comford reviewed Netheril: Empire of Magic for Arcane magazine, rating it an 8 out of 10 overall. Regarding characters traveling back in time to Netheril or creating characters from that time period, he felt that "either choice has excellent adventure possibilities". He commented that "The complexities of time travel and the ramifications of changing past events to effect the future has been clearly thought out, and is neatly side-stepped by only allowing travel to and from Netheril in one fashion. Spells from the Chronomancer supplement cannot access this area of time, the only means to travel is through the Time Conduit Spell created by Mystra, which only allows players to be in the past for one year. In addition anything the characters hold which is not available in the past simply vanishes to be returned when they journey home - equipment, memorised spells and most importantly spell use for priests. The pantheon of Netheril holds only ten deities, creating a major problem for the faithful who find their god absent. Likewise items from the past cannot be brought back to the present. Knowledge, however, can come home, and with 41st level arcanists wandering the land this could prove to be very precious." Comford added: "The opportunity to create Netherese characters has been well structured too, with revised details on classes (none of the optional character kits from the complete books are accessible, among other changes), religion and equipment to reflect the differences in periods." He continued: "The most drastic change, though, is to spellcasting. Spellcasters are arcanists and do not memorise spells - they merely pluck them out of the weave. On reaching 20th level he/she can progress to learn 10th, 11th and 12th level spells. Perhaps the greatest change, though, is that there are no damage limits for spells." Comford concluded his review by saying "An Encyclopaedia Arcana supplement is included giving information on major magical items and spells. Everything needed to play in Netheril can be found within this box-set including two lavishly-drawn maps depicting Netheril both at its height and fall. Netheril is a great campaign expansion. Okay, so players might be put off a little at not being able to bring any mementos back from their travels, but with a little thought the adventure possibilities present can overcome this. If you're after new campaign ideas then this is highly recommended."

== Reviews ==
- Casus Belli #101
