= Mysteries of the Moonsea =

2006 role-playing game supplement

- Genre: Role-playing game
- Publisher: Wizards of the Coast
- Publication date: June 2006
- Media type: Print
- ISBN: 0-7869-3915-X

Mysteries of the Moonsea is a supplement to the 3.5 edition of the Dungeons & Dragons role-playing game.

== Contents ==
Mysteries of the Moonsea is an accessory for the Forgotten Realms which details the Moonsea region, a perilous frontier ruled by tyrants and threatened by monsters, with cities consumed by decadence and war and where conspiracies abound. This accessory contains 37 loosely connected adventures that can be run individually or linked to form the bases of a campaign in the Forgotten Realms. The book also presents maps and descriptions of the cities of Melvaunt, Hillsfar, Mulmaster, and Zhentil Keep, and statistics and descriptions for 15 important villains of the setting.

== Publication history ==
Mysteries of the Moonsea was written by Wil Upchurch, Sean K. Reynolds, Darrin Drader and Thomas M. Reid, and published in June 2006. Cover art was by William O'Connor, with interior art by Ron Lemen, William O'Connor, Francis Tsai, and Franz Vohwinkel.
