= Ruins of Zhentil Keep =

1995 role-playing game supplement

- Genre: Role-playing game
- Publisher: TSR
- Publication date: 1995
- Media type: Boxed set

Ruins of Zhentil Keep is a supplement to the 2nd edition of the Advanced Dungeons & Dragons fantasy role-playing game.

== Contents ==
Ruins of Zhentil Keep is a boxed set for the Forgotten Realms campaign setting. The "Campaign Book" covers Zhentil Keep's people, locales, and creatures in detail. The "Adventure Book" offers a trio of adventures, each staged in a different era.

== Publication history ==
Ruins of Zhentil Keep was written by Kevin Melka and John Terra, with David "Zeb" Cook and Ed Greenwood, and published by TSR, Inc., as a boxed set.

== Reception ==
Rick Swan reviewed Ruins of Zhentil Keep for Dragon magazine #222 (October 1995). He proclaims that "Dungeon Masters stuck with stalled campaigns can do no better than this, a lavish boxed set so stuffed with ideas that the lid practically bulges." He comments that the "Good stuff" includes "a cast of sinister NPCs" like Manshoon of the Zhentarim, and vicious monsters like the render, "a food-aholic that can digest anything". Swan also identifies the "Not-so-good stuff": "the random event tables, which are underdeveloped to the point of irrelevancy [...] and the l-o-n-g historical summaries. But considering the sheer volume of material - over 200 pages worth, plus all manner of data tucked away on card sheets and poster maps - the misfires are easy to overlook."

== Reviews ==
- d8 Magazine #1
