= Undermountain: The Lost Level =

- Genre: Role-playing games
- Publisher: TSR
- Publication date: 1996
- Media type: Print

Undermountain: The Lost Level is an accessory for the 2nd edition of the Advanced Dungeons & Dragons fantasy role-playing game, published in 1996.

== Contents ==
Undermountain: The Lost Level was the first product for the Dungeon Crawl series. It is set in the Forgotten Realms location known as Undermountain. The player characters begin in Room 1 of the dungeon, and must reach Room 30 to exit.

== Publication history ==
Undermountain: The Lost Level was published by TSR, Inc. in 1996.

== Reception ==
Trenton Webb reviewed Undermountain: The Lost Level for Arcane magazine, rating it a 9 out of 10 overall. He notes that by 1996, dungeon crawl adventuring had become "an endangered if not extinct species", and notes that the "Dungeon Crawl series, of which the Undermountain is the first example, aims to revive this straightforward, no-nonsense formula. And it does a fine job." He calls the adventure "a high-risk, high-reward enterprise", and notes that "The Lost Level ignores the beguiling extras that strangle so many campaigns and lets heroes do what heroes do best - act under pressure. And they'd better do the right thing at the right moment, because the dungeon's primed to chew up characters and spit their still smoking bones at the player's feet." Describing the challenges further, he explains that the "obvious threat is supplied by a horde of monsters that haven't been fought for years [...] but they're mere sleight of hand to distract players from the true threat, a caped figure lurking in the shadows. Together these simple elements create a chilling little challenge." Webb concludes his review by saying, "The Dungeon Crawl concept works. Junking a lot of modern day D&D distractions, this is a refreshing return to old-style adventuring - and prices!"
