= The Code of the Harpers =

Dungeons & Dragons rulebook

- Author: Ed Greenwood
- Genre: Role-playing game
- Publisher: TSR
- Publication date: 1993
- Pages: 128

The Code of the Harpers is an accessory for the fictional Forgotten Realms campaign setting for the second edition of the Advanced Dungeons & Dragons fantasy role-playing game. The book was written by Ed Greenwood and was published by TSR. The module featured cover art by Jeff Easley and interior art by Scott Rosema.

== Contents ==
According to John Selzer, the module is the "fourth of the FOR accessory line put out by TSR for the Forgotten Realms setting. The book explores the Harpers, a secretive force for good in the Realms. Along the way, quite a bit of Realm history is revealed, including notes on powerful people and organizations".

The 128-page book begins with a two-page prologue written from the perspective of a number of fictional characters including Storm Silverhand, Danilo Thann, and Elminster.

Page 5 is an introduction by Ed Greenwood explaining that this book is about the fictional Harpers organization, and thus begins with a story about them.

Pages 6–18, The Code of the Harpers, explains what a Harper is and what they do; they are a secretive organization, making them hard to define, most are bards or rangers, and most seek to thwart evil when they can, in their own small ways.

Page 19, Harper Runes, displays a number of runes used by Harpers to send messages to one another.

Pages 20–36, The History of the Harpers, is as detailed a history of the organization as possible, stating that their origins go back to the ancient days of Myth Drannor.

Pages 37–39, The Harpers Today, details the activities of the Harpers as of the writing of the book (1367 Dalereckoning).

Pages 40–41, Master Harpers, describes the abilities of some of the most powerful members of the organization, who have been granted special blessings from a deity (usually Deneir, Eldath, Lliira, Mielikki, Milil, Mystra, Oghma, Selûne, Silvanus, or Tymora).

Pages 42–52, The Senior Harpers, describes several powerful members of the organization: Alustriel Silverhand, Belhuar Thantarth, Cylyria Dragonbreast, Dove Falconhand, Elminster, Khelben "Blackstaff" Arunsun, Laeral Silverhand, Obslin Minstrelwish, and Storm Silverhand.

Pages 53–61, Harper Heroes, details a number of characters previously featured in published Forgotten Realms novels, such as Artus Cimber, Brenna Graycloak, Myrmeen Lhal, Arilyn Moonblade, Olive Ruskettle, Danilo Thann, and Finder Wyvernspur.

Pages 62–71, Some Selected Harpers, details the game statistics for a number of non-player character Harpers, such as Mintiper Moonsilver, and a partial roll of Harpers found in major cities throughout the Realms.

Pages 73–81, The High Heralds, details those who were once part of the Harpers and are still their allies.

Pages 82–84, Harper Allies, described a few characters who are not Harpers but are considered friends, including The Simbul.

Pages 85–99, Harper Haunts, described a number of locations frequented by Harpers.

Pages 100-101, Harper Magic: Spells, details the spells of the Harpers, including one very powerful spell.

Pages 102-116, Harper Magic: Magical Items, presents numerous magical items likely to be found in the possession of a Harper.

Pages 118-120, Foes of the Harpers, described some of the enemies made by the Harpers, including the Zhentarim, the Red Wizards of Thay, the Cult of the Dragon, and more.

Pages 121-122, Joining the Harpers, explains the ways by which prospective members may seek to join the organization.

Pages 123-126, Harper Ballads, presents a selection of ballads and tunes sung by the Harpers.

Page 127 ends the book with a description and monster statistics of the spectral harpist, a type of undead, of which Syluné is one.

== Reception ==
John Selzer reviewed the module in White Wolf Magazine No. 40. He rated the book 4 out of 5 for appearance, complexity, and playability, and 5 out of 5 for concepts and value. Overall, Selzer rated it 4.5 out of a possible 5.
