= Bury Elminster Deep =

2011 novel by Ed Greenwood

- Cover of the first edition
- Author: Ed Greenwood
- Language: English
- Genre: Novel
- Published: 2011 (hardcover); 2012 (paperback)
- Publication place: United States
- Media type: Print
- ISBN: 978-0-7869-5815-3 (hardcover); 978-0-7869-6024-8 (paperback)
- Preceded by: Elminster Must Die
- Followed by: Elminster Enraged

Bury Elminster Deep is a fantasy novel by Ed Greenwood, set in the world of the Forgotten Realms, and based on the Dungeons & Dragons role-playing game. It is one of the novels in "The Elminster Series". It was published in hardcover in August 2011 and in paperback in June 2012.

== Plot summary ==
Bury Elminster Deep is a novel in which the Spellplague and death of the goddess Mystra have left Elminster bodiless and taken away his ability to use magic, while he must try to prevent Lord Manshoon from conquering the kingdom of Cormyr.

== Reception ==
John Ottinger III from Black Gate comments that "Greenwood has played a little too long and a little too roughly with his best character. Elminster is losing form and therefore losing interest for the reader. Bury Elminster Deep is monotonous and boring."

Bury Elminster Deep received a positive review from California Bookwatch, which called it "a top pick for any fantasy collection".
