= Emerald Enclave =

Fictional organization in the Forgotten Realms

Emerald Enclave is a fictional organization appearing in the Forgotten Realms setting for the Dungeons & Dragons role-playing game.

== Description ==
The Emerald Enclave is a power group, a loose group composed mostly of druids, clerics, and bards with a heavy influence over the Vilhon Reach region.

== Reception ==
Trenton Webb reviewed The Vilhon Reach for Arcane magazine, commenting that "what sets The Vilhon Reach apart is the Emerald Enclave", noting that "While the Emerald Enclave currently holds sway it lacks the popular base to run the region - leaving the Reach in a power vacuum. Throughout the long history of the Reach there has always been one prominent if not dominant power. With the rise and fall of each empire, the people have developed a whole host of reasons to rabidly hate each other. Yet in this power vacuum old rivalries and new jealousies have turned the Reach into a powder keg that's ready to blow. Each country is rife with plots, and the success of any single one of them will drag the entire region down into civil war."

== In other media ==
The Emerald Enclave appears in the 2023 film Dungeons & Dragons: Honor Among Thieves. Doric, a tiefling druid is a member of the Emerald Enclave and has organized a resistance against the Lord of Neverwinter who targeted the forest "for its resources".
