= Hiroshi Iwasaki =

Japanese actor and voice actor (born 1953)

- Born: May 29, 1953 (age 73); Saitama Prefecture, Japan
- Occupations: Actor, voice actor
- Years active: 1981–present
- Agent: Seinenza Theater Company

Hiroshi Iwasaki (岩崎 ひろし, Iwasaki Hiroshi; born May 29, 1953) is a Japanese actor and voice actor from Saitama Prefecture, attached to the Seinenza Theater Company. Iwasaki is best known for dubbing over the voices of Stanley Tucci, Rowan Atkinson and the Star Wars character C-3PO.

== Filmography ==
=== Live action ===
==== Television ====
- Rinrin to (1990)
- Yūgenjikkō Sisters Shushutorian (1993), Shigaisen
- Gin Ōkami Kaiki (1996), Itami
- Chihōkisha: Yōsuke Tachibana (1998), #12
- Kayō Suspense Gekijō "Onna Kansatsui Akiko Murō #23: Fushin Shitai" (1998)
- Aoi Tokugawa Sandai (2000), Sakai Tadayo
- Oba-san Deka: Sakura Otome no Jikenchō (2000), #8
- Ai no Kotoba (2001)
- Bengoshi Shishigari Bunsuke: Toki no Ken (2001)
- Musashi Miyamoto (2001), Tanzaemon Aoki
- Sakura (2002), Shinkishi Yatomi
- Musashi (2003), (Tōroku)
- Kōmyō ga Tsuji (2006), Shimazu Yoshihiro
- Part-Time Saibankan (2007), #2
- Hissatsu Shigotonin 2009 (2009), #6, Ryūgen
- NHK Special Shūsen Drama: "Kikotsu no Hanketsu" (2009), Hideki Tōjō
- Shuriken Sentai Ninninger (2015), #40, Advanced Yokai Binbogami (Voice)

==== Films ====
- Nijō Wotsukamu Otoko
- Obo Reru Sakana
- Tsuri Baka Nisshi 13: Hama-chan Kikiippatsu! (Takojima)

=== Stage ===
- Annie (1994), Rooster

=== Anime ===
==== Television ====
1990s

- Cowboy Bebop (1998), Julius
- Arc the Lad (1999), Galuano
- One Piece (1999), Doctor Hogback, Kumacy, Caroline, Kurozumi Orochi

2000s

- Go! Go! Itsutsugo Land (2001), Principal
- Naruto (2002) (Shukaku)
- Cinderella Boy (2003), Robelt
- Tank Knights Portriss (2003), Oneida
- PoPoLoCrois (2003), Chin-san Junior, Sabo-sensei, Gaston
- Human Scramble (2003), Yamashita
- Midnight Horror School (2003), Fukurōjii-san
- Hi no Tori (2004), Hidan
- Gallery Fake (2005), Kichie
- Flag (2006), Christian Beroqui
- Demashita! Powerpuff Girls Z (2006), Ryūta Torabō, Fever Man (ep 29)
- Government Crime Investigation Agent Zaizen Jōtarō (2006), Kunihiro Hakamada
- Lupin III: Seven Days Rhapsody (2006 special), Auto rickshaw Driver
- GeGeGe no Kitaro (2007), Tsujikami (ep 74)
- Mononoke (2007), Jutarō Fukuda
- RoboDz (2008), Elder
- Golgo 13 (2008), Terry Barton
- Heaven's Lost Property (2009), Ojii-chan

2010s

- Smile PreCure! (2012), Akaōni
- From the New World (2013), Kaneko
- Rage of Bahamut (2014), Bacchus
- Donten ni Warau (2014), Chenran Shi
- Mob Psycho 100 (2016), Ishiguro
- The Asterisk War Season 2 (2016), Gustav Marlor (ep. 10–12)
- The Seven Deadly Sins: Revival of The Commandments (2018), Galand (eps. 2–5, 7–)
- Carole & Tuesday (2019), Tobe

2020s

- Dragon Quest: The Adventure of Dai (2020), Masopho
- Vlad Love (2021), Mai's dad
- Deaimon (2022), Masa Tatsumi
- Detective Conan (2022), Kokichi Mukai
- Chillin' in My 30s After Getting Fired from the Demon King's Army (2023), Smith
- Party kara Tsuihō Sareta Sono Chiyushi, Jitsu wa Saikyō ni Tsuki (2024), Mist
- Kagaku×Bōken Survival (2024), Professor Nou
- Daemons of the Shadow Realm (2026), Gonzo Kagemori

==== Films ====
- The Aurora (2000) - Takashi Suematsu
- Oblivion Island: Haruka and the Magic Mirror (2009) - Younger soldier brother
- Dragon Age: Dawn of the Seeker (2012) - Frenic
- The Boy and the Beast (2015)
- Survival (2020) - Dr. Nou
- Pretty Guardian Sailor Moon Cosmos The Movie (2023) – Wiseman

==== Original video animations ====
- Tweeny Witches: The Adventures (2007), Jester (ep 5)

==== Original net animations ====
- Pretty Guardian Sailor Moon Crystal Season II (2015), Wiseman / Death Phantom

=== Video games ===
- Ore no Ryouri (1999)
- Vampire Hunter D (1999) (Benge)
- Final Fantasy X (2001) (Yo Mika)
- Jak and Daxter: The Precursor Legacy (2001) (The Blue Sage)
- Dark Chronicle (2002) (Emperor Mardan)
- Jak II (2003) (Brutter)
- Crash Nitro Kart (2003) (Geary)
- Dragon Quest VIII (2004) (King Trode)
- Ratchet & Clank Future: Tools of Destruction (2007) (Emperor Percival Tachyon)
- Kingdom Hearts Birth by Sleep (2010) (Grand Duke)
- Rhythm Kaito R: Kotei Napoleon no Isan (2012) (Fondue, Rowan)
- Skylanders: Giants (2012) (Jet-Vac)
- Dragon Ball Xenoverse (2015) (Time Patroller - Male 9)
- Batman Arkham Knight (2015) (The Riddler) (Japanese Dub)
- Final Fantasy XV (2016) (Jared Hester)
- Nioh (2017) (Kosen Shisenin)
- Famicom Detective Club: The Missing Heir (2021 Remake) (2021) (Dr. Kumada)

=== Radio dramas ===
- Accuracy of Death (Producer)

=== Dubbing ===
==== Live-action ====
- Stanley Tucci
  - Sidewalks of New York (Griffin Ritso)
  - Shall We Dance? (Link Peterson)
  - The Devil Wears Prada (2010 NTV edition) (Nigel)
  - The Lovely Bones (George Harvey)
  - Burlesque (Sean)
  - The Hunger Games (Caesar Flickerman)
  - The Hunger Games: Catching Fire (Caesar Flickerman)
  - The Hunger Games: Mockingjay – Part 1 (Caesar Flickerman)
  - The Hunger Games: Mockingjay – Part 2 (Caesar Flickerman)
  - Spotlight (Mitchell Garabedian)
  - Patient Zero (The Professor)
  - The Witches (Mr. R.J Stringer)
  - Conclave (Cardinal Aldo Bellini)
- Robin Williams
  - A.I. Artificial Intelligence (2005 TBS edition) (Doctor Know)
  - Insomnia (2005 TV Asahi edition) (Walter Finch)
  - Night at the Museum (Theodore Roosevelt)
  - License to Wed (Reverend Frank Dorman)
  - Night at the Museum: Battle of the Smithsonian (Theodore Roosevelt)
  - The Big Wedding (Father Moinighan)
  - A Merry Friggin' Christmas (Mitch Mitchlert)
  - Night at the Museum: Secret of the Tomb (Theodore Roosevelt)
  - Absolutely Anything (Dennis the Dog)
- Rowan Atkinson
  - Never Say Never Again (Nigel Small-Fawcett)
  - Bean (2002 NTV edition) (Mr. Bean)
  - Rat Race (Enrico Pollini)
  - Scooby-Doo (Emile Mondavarious)
  - Johnny English (Blu-ray edition) (Johnny English)
  - Love Actually (Rufus)
  - Johnny English Reborn (Johnny English)
  - Johnny English Strikes Again (Johnny English)
- Tony Shalhoub
  - A Civil Action (Kevin Conway)
  - Spy Kids (Alexander Minion)
  - Thirteen Ghosts (Arthur Kriticos)
  - Spy Kids 2: The Island of Lost Dreams (Alexander Minion)
  - Spy Kids 3-D: Game Over (Alexander Minion)
  - Against the Ropes (Sam LaRocca)
  - 1408 (Sam Farrell)
- Paul Giamatti
  - The Negotiator (Rudy Timmons)
  - Planet of the Apes (Limbo)
  - Cinderella Man (Joe Gould)
  - Duplicity (Richard "Dick" Garsik)
  - The Last Station (Vladimir Chertkov)
  - Cosmopolis (Benno Levin)
- Will Ferrell
  - Jay and Silent Bob Strike Back (Federal Wildlife Marshal Willenholly)
  - Zoolander (Jacobim Mugatu)
  - The Other Guys (Detective Allen "Gator" Gamble)
  - Daddy's Home (Brad Whitaker)
  - Zoolander 2 (Jacobim Mugatu)
  - Daddy's Home 2 (Brad Whitaker)
- 10,000 BC (The High Priest)
- 13 Going on 30 (Richard Kneeland (Andy Serkis))
- 24: Live Another Day (President Wei (David Yip))
- 28 Years Later (Dr. Ian Kelson (Ralph Fiennes))
- 28 Years Later: The Bone Temple (Dr. Ian Kelson (Ralph Fiennes))
- 3000 Miles to Graceland (U.S. Marshal Damitry (Kevin Pollak))
- The Adventurers (Amber Li (Zhang Jingchu))
- A.I. Artificial Intelligence (Lord Johnson-Johnson (Brendan Gleeson))
- Alias (Marshall Flinkman)
- Alice in Wonderland (2013 Fuji TV edition) (Cheshire Cat (Stephen Fry))
- Alien: The Director's Cut (Ash (Ian Holm))
- Aloha (Carson Welch (Bill Murray))
- And Just Like That... (Stanford Blatch (Willie Garson))
- Arabian Nights (Genie of the Lamp, Genie of the Ring)
- Armageddon (2002 Fuji TV edition) (Stu the Cabbie (Mark Curry))
- Armageddon (2004 NTV edition) (Dan Truman (Billy Bob Thornton))
- August: Osage County (Charles Aiken (Chris Cooper))
- Austin Powers in Goldmember (Mini-Me, Danny DeVito, Ozzy Osbourne, Mini-Austin)
- Austin Powers: The Spy Who Shagged Me (Mini-Me)
- The Aviator (Noah Dietrich (John C. Reilly))
- The Bank Job (Bambas (Alki David))
- Batman Begins (2008 Fuji TV edition) (Alfred Pennyworth (Michael Caine))
- The Beach (Daffy (Robert Carlyle))
- Bedazzled (Bob (Paul Adelstein))
- Black Hawk Down (Danny McKnight (Tom Sizemore))
- The Bourne Ultimatum (2009 Fuji TV edition) (Neal Daniels (Colin Stinton))
- Catch Me If You Can (Roger Strong (Martin Sheen))
- Cats & Dogs (Calico)
- The Cell (Carl Rudolph Stargher (Vincent D'Onofrio))
- Charlie's Angels (The Thin Man (Crispin Glover))
- Charlie's Angels: Full Throttle (The Thin Man (Crispin Glover))
- The Chronicles of Narnia: Prince Caspian (Trumpkin (Peter Dinklage))
- Cop Land (2000 NTV edition) (Officer Jack Rucker (Robert Patrick))
- The Country Bears (Tennessee O'Neal)
- Damo (Baek Jo-wan)
- Desperate Housewives (Vern)
- Dessau Dancers (Walter Satzke)
- Dungeons & Dragons: Honor Among Thieves (Szass Tam (Ian Hanmore))
- End of Days (2001 TV Asahi edition) (Bobby Chicago (Kevin Pollak))
- Episodes (Merc Lapidus (John Pankow))
- Eyes Wide Shut (Additional voice)
- Final Destination (Larry Murnau, TV News Anchor)
- The Founder (Maurice McDonald (John Carroll Lynch))
- Frank Herbert's Dune (Stilgar (Uwe Ochsenknecht))
- Frank Herbert's Children of Dune (Stilgar (Steven Berkoff))
- Friends (Earl (Jason Alexander))
- From the Earth to the Moon (Ed White, Donn F. Eisele, Buzz Aldrin, Sam Langfitt, Fred Haise)
- Frost/Nixon (Swifty Lazar (Toby Jones))
- Garfield: The Movie (Happy Chapman (Stephen Tobolowsky))
- Ghostbusters (Hotel manager)
- The Good Doctor (Dr. Aaron Glassman (Richard Schiff))
- The Grand Budapest Hotel (Mr. Moustafa (F. Murray Abraham))
- The Great Escape (2000 TV Tokyo edition) (Flying Officer Archibald 'Archie' Ives (Angus Lennie))
- Hamlet 2 (Dana Marschz (Steve Coogan))
- Hannah Montana: The Movie (Oswald Granger (Peter Gunn))
- Hansel and Gretel (The Troll (Bobcat Goldthwait))
- Hellboy II: The Golden Army (Tom Manning (Jeffrey Tambor))
- Hellraiser: Inferno (Bernie (Nicholas Sadler))
- The Hitchhiker's Guide to the Galaxy (Additional voice)
- Holes (Dr. Pendanski (Tim Blake Nelson))
- Hotel Babylon (Mister Machin (Anthony Head))
- I Am Sam (2005 NTV edition) (Robert (Stanley DeSantis))
- I Spy (T.J.)
- Island of Lost Souls (Necromancer (Lars Mikkelsen))
- Infernal Affairs (Hon Sam (Eric Tsang))
- Intolerable Cruelty (Gus Petch (Cedric the Entertainer))
- Jason Bourne (2022 BS Tokyo edition) (Malcolm Smith (Bill Camp))
- Jaws 2 (2022 BS Tokyo edition) (Phil Fogerty (Herb Muller))
- Jay and Silent Bob Strike Back (Wes Craven)
- John Q. (2007 NTV edition) (Lester Matthews (Eddie Griffin))
- Kingsman: The Golden Circle (Elton John)
- Kung Fu Hustle (Western-style clothes shopkeeper)
- The Last Princess (Emperor Gojong (Baek Yoon-sik))
- Life Is Beautiful (2001 TV Asahi edition) (Ferruccio (Sergio Bustric))
- Lincoln Rhyme: Hunt for the Bone Collector (Peter Taylor / The Bone Collector (Brían F. O'Byrne))
- Little House on the Prairie (2019 NHK BS4K edition) (Nels Oleson (Richard Bull))
- Little Miss Sunshine (Frank Ginsberg (Steve Carell))
- The Lord of the Rings: The Return of the King (Déagol (Thomas Robins))
- Mad Max Beyond Thunderdome (2015 Supercharger edition) (The Pig Killer (Robert Grubb))
- Magadheera (Sher Khan / Solomon (Srihari))
- The Matrix (2002 Fuji TV edition) (Tank (Marcus Chong))
- Maximum Conviction (Manning (Stone Cold Steve Austin))
- Maximum Risk (2000 TV Asahi edition) (Agent Pellman (Paul Ben-Victor))
- The Medallion (Arthur Watson (Lee Evans))
- Meet Dave (Engineer (Judah Friedlander))
- Meet the Spartans (Xerxes (Ken Davitian))
- Men in Black II (Scrad and Charlie (Johnny Knoxville))
- The Merchant of Venice (Antonio (Jeremy Irons))
- Mercury Rising (2001 TV Asahi edition) (Peter Burrell (Lindsey Ginter))
- The Mermaid (Constable Mr. Mo (Wen Zhang))
- Mirror Mirror (Brighton (Nathan Lane))
- Monster Hunt (Gao (Eric Tsang))
- The Mummy (2002 NTV edition) (Beni Gabor (Kevin J. O'Connor))
- Nacho Libre (Guillermo (Richard Montoya))
- Nash Bridges (Tony 'Tony B' Bucelli (Stephen Lee))
- National Security (Lieutenant Washington (Bill Duke))
- Never Die Alone (Moon (Clifton Powell))
- Night at the Museum: Battle of the Smithsonian (Albert Einstein Bobbleheads (Eugene Levy))
- Ocean's Twelve (Bruce Willis)
- The Offer (Mario Puzo (Patrick Gallo))
- The Order (Thomas Garrett (Mark Addy))
- The Pacifier (Vice Principal Dwayne Murney (Brad Garrett))
- Paddington 2 (Spoon)
- Payback (2001 NTV edition) (Arthur Stegman (David Paymer))
- Red Dwarf (Kryten since season 10 (Robert Llewellyn), Butler (Dominic Coleman))
- Rescue Dawn (Y.C.)
- The Ridiculous 6 (Ramon Lopez Stockburn (Rob Schneider))
- Rogue One (C-3PO)
- Rush Hour 3 (George Cabbie (Yvan Attal))
- Safe (Captain Wolf (Robert John Burke))
- Seabiscuit ("Tick Tock" McLaughlin (William H. Macy))
- Seinfeld (George Costanza (Jason Alexander))
- The Sessions (Father Brendan (William H. Macy))
- Sex and the City (Stanford Blatch (Willie Garson))
- Shaolin Soccer (Iron Head (Wong Yat-fei))
- Six Feet Under (Nathaniel Samuel Fisher Sr. (Richard Jenkins))
- Smokin' Aces (Stanley Locke (Andy García))
- Snatch (2017 Blu-Ray edition) (Boris "The Blade" Yurinov (Rade Šerbedžija))
- So Little Time (Manuelo (Taylor Negron))
- Son of the Mask (Daniel Moss (Steven Wright))
- Sonic the Hedgehog (Crazy Carl (Frank C. Turner))
- Star Trek: Voyager (Reginald Barclay (Dwight Schultz))
- Star Wars: Episode I – The Phantom Menace (C-3PO)
- Star Wars: Episode II – Attack of the Clones (C-3PO)
- Star Wars: Episode III – Revenge of the Sith (C-3PO)
- Star Wars Episode IV: A New Hope (2002 NTV edition) (C-3PO)
- Star Wars: The Force Awakens (C-3PO)
- Star Wars: The Last Jedi (C-3PO)
- Star Wars: The Rise of Skywalker (C-3PO)
- Tactical Force (SWAT Captain Frank Tater (Stone Cold Steve Austin))
- The Tailor of Panama (Harry Pendel (Geoffrey Rush))
- Taxi 5 (Régis (Lionel Laget))
- Ted 2 (Tom Jessup (John Carroll Lynch))
- The Terminator (2003 TV Tokyo edition) (Doctor Peter Silberman (Earl Boen))
- Top Gun (2005 NTV edition) (LCDR Rick "Jester" Heatherly (Michael Ironside))
- The Towering Inferno (2013 BS Japan edition) (Harlee Claiborne (Fred Astaire))
- Transformers (Bobby Bolivia (Bernie Mac))
- Transformers: Dark of the Moon (Leadfoot)
- True Memoirs of an International Assassin (Netflix edition) (President Cueto (Kim Coates))
- Twilight (2010 NTV edition) (Charlie Swan (Billy Burke))
- Van Helsing (Igor (Kevin J. O'Connor))
- Vice (Donald Rumsfeld (Steve Carell))
- Virus (2002 NTV edition) (Squeaky (Julio Oscar Mechoso))
- We Bought a Zoo (Duncan Mee (Thomas Haden Church))
- West Side Story (1999 TV Tokyo edition) (Police Sergeant Krupke (William Bramley))
- Whitechapel (Edward Buchan (Steve Pemberton))
- Wonder Woman (Patrick Morgan / Ares (David Thewlis))
- Wonka (Basil (Simon Farnaby))

==== Animation ====
- The Addams Family (Priest)
- The Angry Birds Movie (Leonard)
- The Angry Birds Movie 2 (Leonard)
- Atomic Betty (Maximus I.Q.)
- Adventure Time (Earl of Lemongrab)
- The Boondocks (Uncle Ruckus)
- Captain Underpants: The First Epic Movie (Professor Poopypants)
- Cats Don't Dance (Flanigan)
- Cars (Strip "The King" Weathers)
- Cars 3 (Strip "The King" Weathers)
- Chowder (Mung Daal)
- Chuggington (Speedy)
- Cinderella II: Dreams Come True (Grand Duke)
- Cinderella III: A Twist in Time (Grand Duke)
- Corpse Bride (Emil)
- Curious George (Chef Pisghetti)
- DC League of Super-Pets (Dog-El)
- Despicable Me 4 (Silas Ramsbottom)
- Droopy (DVD edition) (Wolf)
- The Fairly OddParents (Denzel Q. Crocker)
- Garfield and Friends (Cartoon Network edition 6–7) (Binky the Clown)
- Generator Rex (Agent Six)
- Hoodwinked! (Kirk the Woodsman)
- How to Train Your Dragon (Gobber the Belch)
- How to Train Your Dragon 2 (Gobber the Belch)
- How to Train Your Dragon: The Hidden World (Gobber the Belch)
- Ice Age: Dawn of the Dinosaurs (Buck the Weasel)
- Ice Age: Collision Course (Buck the Weasel)
- The Ice Age Adventures of Buck Wild (Buck the Weasel)
- Kim Possible (Duff Killigan)
- The Lego Movie (Benny, Green Lantern)
- The Lego Movie 2: The Second Part (Benny, Green Lantern)
- The Little Mermaid II: Return to the Sea (Chef Louie)
- Madeline (Pepito's Father)
- My Little Pony: Friendship is Magic (Steven Magnet the Sea Serpent ("Friendship is Magic"))
- The Queen's Corgi (Nelson)
- Queer Duck: The Movie (Openly Gator)
- Ralph Breaks the Internet (C-3PO)
- Rick and Morty (Mr. Goldenfold, King Jellybean)
- Robinson Crusoe (Tuesday)
- Sausage Party (Firewater)
- The Simpsons Movie (Theater edition) (Krusty the Clown)
- Star Wars: Clone Wars (C-3PO)
- Star Wars: The Clone Wars (C-3PO)
- Star Wars: The Clone Wars (C-3PO)
- Star Wars: Droids (2005 DVD edition) (C-3PO)
- Thomas and the Magic Railroad (Dodge)
- Turbo (Chet)
- Turning Red (Mr. Gao)
- Wreck-It Ralph (Zombie)

==== Video games ====
- Spider-Man 2 (Kraven the Hunter)
