= Red Wizards of Thay =

Fictional Forgotten Realms organization

The Red Wizards of Thay are a fictional organization and social class of evil aligned wizards in the Forgotten Realms campaign setting of the Dungeons & Dragons fantasy role-playing games.

== Development and publication history ==
According to Ken Rolston, "The haughty and arrogant Red Wizards of Thay employ their awesome sorcerous powers in their expansionistic and imperialistic policy of swallowing up neighbor states."

AD&D's 1st edition supplement Dreams of the Red Wizards (1988) explored the nation of Thay and the history of the Red Wizards.

The lands of Thay and the Red Wizards were revisited and detailed in the 2nd edition AD&D boxed set Spellbound (1995), which pits player characters against them in two adventures.

More information about the Red Wizards can be found in the Forgotten Realms Campaign Setting book, and the supplemental Forgotten Realms sourcebooks Lords of Darkness and Unapproachable East.

Red Wizards are featured in the adventure "Dead in Thay" in the book Tales from the Yawning Portal, and can be encountered in Tomb of Annihilation.

The Red Wizards appear as antagonists in the novels Red Magic (1991) by Jean Rabe, and Whisper of Waves (2005) by Philip Athans. The Haunted Lands (2007-2009) are a trilogy of novels that detail Szass Tam's rise to power.

== Fictional description ==
According to the Forgotten Realms Campaign Setting book, Red Wizards are the usually notorious and nefarious spellcasters who are the ruling class in the inhospitable but populous country of Thay. The Red Wizards are described as slavers, demonologists, magical experimenters and scholars. They constantly scheme to bring down their neighbouring nations of Rashemen—where they are thwarted by the Witches of Rashemen; Aglarond—where they are turned back by the Simbul of the Seven Sisters; and Mulhorand—where the people of Thay originated. Source material also features certain academies, such as the Academy of Shapers and Binders in Thaymount, that are considered "anomalies" among the Red Wizards, as they discourage betrayal, deceit and slavery; their members show compassion and mercy unlike most others of their kind.

In the year 922 DR, Thay asserted its independence from Mulhorandi, an oppressive ancient nation dependent on slavery. This move followed a rebellion spearheaded by Ythazz Buvaar, who subsequently became the inaugural zulkir. The Thayans formed an alliance with Eltab, a demon lord, who assisted them in overcoming their foes and altering the outcome of the Battle of Thazalhar. Consequently, the rebels managed to seize the city of Delhumide and almost completely destroyed it.

In 934 DR, the Red Wizards tried to annex Rashamen but were unsuccessful in their efforts.

In 1030 DR the Council of Zulkirs was established by the lich Ythazz Buvaar and the original Red Wizards that fought for Thay's independence a century earlier.

In 1104 DR, Szass Tam, the future Zulkir of Necromancy and the Ruler of Thay, was born.

The leaders of the Red Wizards are titled the eight zulkirs, each for a different school of magic, who are also "always intriguing between themselves." Chief among these is Szass Tam, an undead archmage.

The Red Wizards are described as the enemies of many forces in Abeir-Toril—whilst they receive support from demons and devils and drow, among those who oppose them are the Witches of Rashemen, the Seven Sisters and their allies, the goodly Harpers, and even the Zhentarim, who dislike the wizards encroaching on their territory.

The wizards were once a secretive sect that was named after the nearby Mulhorandi province.

One plot started after another failed attempt at securing Rashemen in 1357 DR is to infiltrate the nations of Faerûn legitimately—in Thayan enclaves which will publicly sell magic items and quietly also traffic drugs, wicked spells, and slaves. Using these they hope to eventually have strongholds and resulting political infiltration that will make them indispensable and powerful, and further their hopes of world domination.

== Character class ==
The Red Wizard prestige class is associated with the Red Wizards of Thay organization.

== In other media ==
Red Wizards appear as antagonists in the computer game Icewind Dale II.

Red Wizard Edwin Odesseiron is a potential party member in both Baldur's Gate and its sequel Baldur's Gate II.

Red Wizards appear in the film Dungeons & Dragons: Honor Among Thieves (2023). Daisy Head appears in the film as Sofina, a Red Wizard of Thay, with a focus in necromancy and "ties to Thay's tyrannical magocracy". Jason Wong appears as Dralas, also a Red Wizard of Thay.

== Reception ==
Shadis reviewer Keith H. Eisenbeis considered the Red Wizards "a great set of enemies [...] Powerful and power hungry, these bad guys can make the players into great heroes." Additionally, the Red Wizards in charge of the government of Thay provide adventure hooks as the "players could easily find themselves embroiled in one of [their] machinations."

== Additional reading ==
- Donovan, Dale. Villains' Lorebook (TSR, 1998).
- Greenwood, Ed. The Code of the Harpers (TSR, 1993).
- Grubb, Jeff and Ed Greenwood. Forgotten Realms Adventures (TSR, 1990).
