= The Vilhon Reach =

Forgotten Realms supplement

- Genre: Role-playing games
- Publisher: TSR
- Publication date: 1996
- Media type: Print

The Vilhon Reach is an accessory for the 2nd edition of the Advanced Dungeons & Dragons fantasy role-playing game, published in 1996.

== Contents ==
The Vilhon Reach is a Forgotten Realms supplement that focuses on the Vilhon Reach area and its nations, including Chondath. The book also details the power group known as the Emerald Enclave, a loosely organized group of druids, clerics, bards, and others which exerts a heavy influence on the region.

== Publication history ==
The Vilhon Reach was published by TSR, Inc. in 1996.

== Reception ==
Trenton Webb reviewed The Vilhon Reach for Arcane magazine, rating it an 8 out of 10 overall. He expected a book on this region to be dull: "It's too civilised, too central and too focused on trade to be any fun. Yet this latest Forgotten Realms campaign expansion takes tedious trading towns and develops them into a network of delightfully jealous city states teetering on the brink of war." He felt that the material on the region itself was "good, if predictable stuff", he countered that "what sets The Vilhon Reach apart is the Emerald Enclave." He continues, noting that "While the Emerald Enclave currently holds sway it lacks the popular base to run the region - leaving the Reach in a power vacuum. Throughout the long history of the Reach there has always been one prominent if not dominant power. With the rise and fall of each empire, the people have developed a whole host of reasons to rabidly hate each other. Yet in this power vacuum old rivalries and new jealousies have turned th Reach into a powder keg that's ready to blow. Each country is rife with plots, and the success of any single one of them will drag the entire region down into civil war." Webb concluded his review by saying, "The Reach welcomes adventurers. Each army needs specialists, each town needs problems solved and there's treasure aplenty washing around the many ruined cities. But those who take on these challenges risk becoming embroiled in a truly titanic power struggle. Now that's a shame."
