= Nergal (disambiguation) =

Nergal is a Mesopotamian deity.

Nergal may also refer to:

== Books and comics ==
- Nergal, a demon in the comic book series Hellblazer
- Nergal, the antagonist in Ed Greenwood's novel Elminster in Hell
- Nergal, a battleship in David Weber's Mutineers' Moon

== Games ==
- Nergal (Dungeons & Dragons), a devil in Dungeons & Dragons
- Nergal (Fire Emblem), the main villain in Fire Emblem: Rekka no Ken
- Nergal, one of the founding members of the Baali bloodline in the role-playing game Vampire: The Masquerade
- Nergal, an antagonist in the video game Bishōjo Senshi Sailor Moon: Another Story

== Television ==
- Nergal, a recurring character from the animated series The Grim Adventures of Billy & Mandy, or his son, Nergal Jr.
- Nergal Heavy Industries, a company in the anime Martian Successor Nadesico

== Other uses ==
- Nergal (musician) (born Adam Michał Darski, 1977), vocalist and guitarist of the Polish band Behemoth
- Nergal (crater), a crater on Jupiter's moon Ganymede

== See also ==
- Nirgal, a character in Kim Stanley Robinson's Mars trilogy
- Nurgle, a god in the Warhammer fictional universe
- Nermal, a small gray cat from the Garfield comics
