= Dungeons & Dragons: Honor Among Thieves =

2023 film by Jonathan Goldstein and John Francis Daley

- Theatrical release poster
- Directed by: Jonathan Goldstein; John Francis Daley
- Screenplay by: Jonathan Goldstein; John Francis Daley; Michael Gilio
- Story by: Chris McKay; Michael Gilio
- Based on: Dungeons & Dragons by Hasbro (Note: Dungeons & Dragons was originally designed by Gary Gygax and Dave Arneson and published by TSR, and is currently published by Hasbro subsidiary Wizards of the Coast. The film itself is set in the Forgotten Realms setting, which was created by Ed Greenwood.)
- Produced by: Jeremy Latcham; Brian Goldner; Nick Meyer
- Starring: Chris Pine; Michelle Rodriguez; Regé-Jean Page; Justice Smith; Sophia Lillis; Hugh Grant
- Cinematography: Barry Peterson
- Edited by: Dan Lebental
- Music by: Lorne Balfe
- Production companies: Paramount Pictures; eOne; Wizards of the Coast
- Distributed by: Paramount Pictures (worldwide); Entertainment One (United Kingdom)
- Release dates: March 10, 2023 (SXSW); March 30, 2023 (Australia); March 31, 2023 (North America)
- Running time: 134 minutes
- Countries: United States; Canada
- Language: English
- Budget: $150 million
- Box office: $208.2 million

Dungeons & Dragons: Honor Among Thieves is a 2023 fantasy heist film directed by Jonathan Goldstein and John Francis Daley, who co-wrote the screenplay with Michael Gilio from a story by Chris McKay and Gilio. Based on the tabletop role-playing game Dungeons & Dragons, it is set in the Forgotten Realms campaign setting and has no connections to the previous film trilogy released between 2000 and 2012. The film stars Chris Pine, Michelle Rodriguez, Regé-Jean Page, Justice Smith, Sophia Lillis, and Hugh Grant, and follows bard Edgin Darvis (Pine) and barbarian Holga Kilgore (Rodriguez), who enlist a team of unlikely heroes to steal an ancient and powerful relic but come into conflict with evil forces.

Production went through various phases in development since 2013, beginning with Warner Bros. Pictures after beating Hasbro and Universal Pictures in a lawsuit over the film rights to the tabletop game, before moving to Paramount Pictures, each with various writers and directors. Goldstein and Daley were the final writers and directors, using elements from the previous attempt by director Chris McKay and screenwriter Michael Gilio. Filming began in April 2021 in Iceland and later Northern Ireland.

Dungeons & Dragons: Honor Among Thieves had its world premiere at South by Southwest on March 10, 2023, and was released in the United States on March 31 by Paramount. The film received positive reviews from critics, with praise for the performances of the cast, the direction, visual effects, writing, score, humor, and tone. It grossed $208.2 million worldwide on a $150 million budget, making it a box office disappointment.

== Plot ==
Prior to being imprisoned for grand larceny, bard Edgin "Ed" Darvis served in the Harpers, an order of peacekeepers, until his wife was killed by disciples of a Red Wizard he arrested. Accompanied by barbarian Holga Kilgore, Ed attempted to make a new life for himself and his daughter Kira by turning to theft, teaming with amateur sorcerer Simon Aumar, rogue con artist Forge Fitzwilliam, and Forge's mysterious acquaintance Sofina. While raiding a Harper stronghold, Ed attempted to steal a "Tablet of Reawakening" to resurrect his wife, but he and Holga were captured, though their accomplices escaped.

After two years' imprisonment in frozen Revel's End, Ed and Holga escape to Neverwinter and learn Forge has become Lord there after its prior Lord was mysteriously incapacitated. He has been taking care of Kira, convincing her that Ed's greed led to his arrest. It is revealed that Sofina is a Red Wizard and together they orchestrated Ed and Holga's capture.

Sofina orders Ed and Holga's execution, but they escape and decide to rob Forge's vault and bring Kira home during the upcoming High Sun Games, needing the tablet to prove their innocence to Kira and resurrect Ed's wife. Ed and Holga track down Simon to help. With his help, the group also recruits Doric, a druid whose forest community is fighting forced logging ordered by Forge.

After shapeshifting into a fly, Doric infiltrates Forge's castle and finds the vault has magical defenses from Mordenkainen, which Simon cannot disable. He believes a magic relic, "The Helm of Disjunction," could help, and the group travels to a graveyard to ask Holga's ancestors where to find it. Simon resurrects the dead with a talisman long enough for them to answer the group's questions. The corpses reveal they gave the Helm to Xenk Yendar, a paladin who fled Thay, his country, when Red Wizard Szass Tam turned Thayans into an undead army.

After forcing Ed to swear to distribute any gained bounty to the people, Xenk guides the group through the Underdark to retrieve the Helm. With the help of a teleportation staff obtained from Holga's halfling ex-husband, they find the relic but are attacked by Thayan assassins sent by Sofina. Xenk fights them off and helps the group escape from the obese red dragon Themberchaud before departing.

Simon has trouble mastering the Helm's power, so they decide to use the staff to enter the vault during the games. After finally attuning to the helm by overcoming his self-esteem issues, Simon dispels the magical seal on the vault. He and Holga enter the vault, but find the room empty except for a magical trap. Sofina, disguised as Kira, subdues Ed. The group is captured and forced to participate in the games, but escapes the stadium. Doric discovers Forge has loaded the treasure onto a boat and is preparing to flee. The group steals the boat for themselves and rescues Kira from Forge.

As they escape, the group realize Sofina organized the games to draw a massive crowd and turn them into an undead army using the curse that destroyed Thay. The group returns, transporting Forge's stolen riches out of the boat with the teleportation staff and spreading them across the city by hot-air balloon, drawing people out of the stadium before Sofina's spell takes effect.

Enraged at her failure, Sofina attacks the group. Simon nullifies her time-stop spell, allowing Kira to use the invisibility pendant Ed and Holga gave her as a child to place an anti-magic bracelet on Sofina. Although Doric is able to kill Sofina, Holga is fatally injured. Ed uses the tablet to bring her back to life, realizing he wanted to bring back his wife only for his own sake, while Holga had become a true part of their family. Doric expresses being open to a relationship with Simon.

Restored, the old Lord of Neverwinter declares the team heroes of the realm. Xenk sends Forge to Revel's End, where he fails to escape as Ed and Holga did when his pardon is denied.

== Cast ==
- Chris Pine as Edgin "Ed" Darvis, a bard and former member of the Harpers. After his wife was murdered, he raised his daughter Kira with his friend Holga. In prison with Holga following a heist gone wrong, he plots their escape in hopes of being reunited with his daughter.
- Michelle Rodriguez as Holga Kilgore, a barbarian who was banished from the Uthgardt Elk Tribe for marrying an outsider. She acts as a foster mother for Kira and is imprisoned with Edgin.
- Justice Smith as Simon Aumar, a half-elf wild magic sorcerer who is the descendant of Elminster Aumar, a notable wizard. He was once rejected romantically by Doric.
- Sophia Lillis as Doric, a tiefling druid raised in the Neverwinter Wood by a wood elf enclave. She is a member of the Emerald Enclave and has organized a resistance group against the Lord of Neverwinter who targeted the forest "for its resources".
- Hugh Grant as Forge Fitzwilliam, an ambitious rogue and con artist. He is a former member of Edgin's crew, and has been taking care of Edgin's daughter, Kira. Since Edgin's imprisonment, he has become the Lord of Neverwinter, gained great wealth and received counsel from Sofina.
- Regé-Jean Page as Xenk Yendar, a paladin who narrowly escaped the lich Szass Tam's "rise to power" in Thay and as a result, "ages more slowly than a normal human".
  - Rylan Jackson as a young Xenk.
- Chloe Coleman as Kira Darvis, Edgin's 14-year-old daughter who has fallen under the sway of Forge, her guardian for two years following her father's imprisonment
  - Sophia Nell-Huntley as young Kira
- Daisy Head as Sofina, a Red Wizard of Thay with a focus in necromancy and "ties to Thay's tyrannical magocracy".
- Jason Wong as Dralas, a Red Wizard of Thay who works as an assassin for Sofina.
- Bradley Cooper as Marlamin, Holga's halfling ex-husband.
- Ian Hanmore as Szass Tam, a powerful Red Wizard lich and the ruler of Thay.
- Georgia Landers as Zia Darvis, Edgin's late wife.

Additionally, the film features Spencer Wilding as Gorg, an arriving hobgoblin inmate at Revel's End prison; Will Irvine as Tobias, a guard at Revel's End prison; Nicholas Blane as Chancellor Anderton, a human member of the Absolution Council at Revel's End prison; Bryan Larkin as Chancellor Norixius, a silver dragonborn member of the Absolution Council at Revel's End prison; Clayton Grover as Chancellor Jarnathan, an aarakocra member of the Absolution Council at Revel's End prison; Sarah Amankwah as Baroness Torbo, a female halfling member of the Absolution Council at Revel's End prison; Paul Bazely as Porb Piradost, a nobleman of Waterdeep; Hayley-Marie Axe as Gwinn, a barbarian who is the second wife of Marlamin; Tom Morello as Kimathi Stormhollow, a spectator at the High Sun Games; and Jude Hill as Boy in Stands. David Durham appears as a hallucination of Simon's ancestor Elminster Aumar.

Additionally, comedy group Aunty Donna provided the voices for corpses for the Australian release of the film.

The main characters from the Dungeons & Dragons cartoon make live-action cameos during the High Sun Games, with Edgar Abram as Hank, Seamus O'Hara as Presto, Emer McDaid as Sheila, Trevor Kaneswaran as Eric, Moe Sasegbon as Diana, and Luke Bennett as Bobby.

== Production ==
=== Development and casting ===
In May 2013, Warner Bros. Pictures and Courtney Solomon's Sweetpea Entertainment announced a film based on Dungeons & Dragons with David Leslie Johnson-McGoldrick writing the script and Roy Lee, Alan Zeman, and Solomon producing. Two days later, Hasbro issued a lawsuit saying that they were co-producing a Dungeons & Dragons film at Universal Pictures with Chris Morgan writing and directing. In August 2015, after U.S. District Judge Dolly Gee urged Sweetpea Entertainment and Hasbro to settle the film rights case, the Warner Bros. film was set for pre-production with Hasbro. In March 2016, Rob Letterman was in negotiations to direct Johnson-McGoldrick's script, with his role confirmed in May 2016. In April 2017, actor Joe Manganiello, an avid fan of Dungeons & Dragons, revealed that he had written a script with John Cassel for the project and was "talking to all the right parties" to make the film happen. Upon completing the script, Manganiello worked in collaboration with Brad Peyton and Dwayne Johnson, who were both in negotiations to develop the film.

In December 2017, after varying degrees of progression, the film was moved by Hasbro to Paramount Pictures and was scheduled for a release date of July 23, 2021. In February 2018, Paramount was in talks with both Chris McKay and Michael Gilio to direct and write the film, respectively. In March 2019, it was revealed that Gilio had completed a first draft and studio executives expressed excitement for the film. The studio began negotiations with various talent, as the casting process began. In July 2019, Jonathan Goldstein and John Francis Daley were in talks to direct. Goldstein and Daley began meeting with Paramount following Daley talking about his career with a literary agent at a sports bar in Sherman Oaks during a game between the Chicago Cubs, which Daley is a fan of, and the Los Angeles Dodgers. After saying to the agent that he and Goldstein had left directing duties on The Flash, the agent asked if they were looking for work. The agent tipped off Paramount, who presented Goldstein and Daley with the script for Dungeons & Dragons.

In June 2016, Ansel Elgort was in talks to star in Letterman's iteration of the film. In December 2020, Chris Pine was cast to star in the film. Michelle Rodriguez, Justice Smith, and Regé-Jean Page were added in February 2021. Hugh Grant and Sophia Lillis would join the next month, with Grant cast as the antagonist. In April, Chloe Coleman joined the ensemble cast. In May, Jason Wong and Daisy Head joined the cast. During post-production, Bradley Cooper was cast in a cameo role. He filmed his part on blue screen and was inserted into preexisting footage shot with Rodriguez.

=== Writing ===
By January 2020, Goldstein and Daley announced that they had co-written a new draft of the script. Ultimately, Daley, Goldstein, and Gilio received screenplay credit, while McKay and Gilio received story credit. The film is set in the Forgotten Realms campaign setting of Dungeons & Dragons. Goldstein stated that "ours is a movie that doesn't take itself with great seriousness, but it's never a spoof. It honors the world of D&D and celebrates it but, hopefully, it gives the audience an engaging and fun ride". Daley commented that the film's influences include The Princess Bride, Monty Python and the Holy Grail, The Lord of the Rings, and Indiana Jones, with the Indiana Jones structure evoking both a "dungeon crawl" and the heist film genre that they wanted to draw on. Daley highlighted that the heist genre is familiar to the audience, which provides the framework for the "uninitiated" so that "they understand what our characters are setting out to do without being overwhelmed by lore or proper nouns". Daley also wanted the film to be accessible for those unfamiliar with the fantasy genre. The Austin Chronicle highlighted "since the basis of most tabletop campaigns is a group of strangers coming together to complete a job, the thematic parallels between heist movies and fantasy roleplaying campaigns offer a shared language for newcomers".

Goldstein commented that they use the sorcerer character in the film to address why magic can't "solve all problems"—"it makes storytelling nearly impossible if you can solve any problem with a magical spell". Goldstein stated that when discussing the visual presentation of the film with Daley that they decided they didn't want "two people standing there with their hands out and rays coming out of their hands". As a result, the film pulls directly from the magic system of Dungeons & Dragons with magic users "combining physical components and verbal spellcasting to show a variety of magical effects onscreen". Justice Smith, who plays the sorcerer, commented that he worked with the choreographer "to create unique gestures for each spell" with many of the spells incorporating actual sign language into the gestures.

=== Filming and visual effects ===
Filming began in early April 2021, with a crew of 60–70 people in Iceland. Principal photography commenced in Belfast, Northern Ireland later that month. Goldstein stated that when the cast arrived in Northern Ireland they "played a several-hours-long game of D&D" with the actors role-playing as their film characters which "gave those who were not familiar with [D&D] a quick taste of what the game is like and how you interact". This game "also informed the directors' takes on the characters" with Goldstein commenting that "I think we incorporated some of the things we learned from that game into the film". On August 19, 2021, Daley announced that filming had completed. The visual effects are provided by Industrial Light & Magic, Moving Picture Company and Crafty Apes.

== Music ==
Lorne Balfe scored the film; Balfe stated "I used to play Dungeons, so when I heard they were making that, I knew I wanted to be part of the team". On March 10, 2023, Tame Impala released the single "Wings of Time" for the film. Marisa Mirabal, for IndieWire, wrote that "Balfe heightens the tension with a unique mixture of verbal chanting and rhythmic beats that properly enhance the meticulous stuntwork. The score morphs into a creature of its own and is unlike the soothing, sweeping scores of other fantasy films. Balfe also successfully leans into the bard lore of Pine's character by composing songs that are light-hearted, poetic, and heavy with string instruments". The soundtrack album for the film was released on March 31, 2023, by Mercury Classics Soundtracks & Scores label.

On March 19, Chris Pine and Michelle Rodriguez revealed that the track "l'Emprise" appearing on Mylène Farmer's eponymous album will be on the soundtrack in French-speaking countries.

A companion album was released on June 23, 2023, with 14 songs inspired by the world of Taverns in Dungeons & Dragons, written by Lorne Balfe with directors Jonathan Goldstein and John Francis Daley.

== Release ==
=== Theatrical ===
Dungeons & Dragons: Honor Among Thieves had its world premiere at the 2023 South by Southwest Film & TV Festival on March 10, 2023, and was theatrically released in the United States on March 31 in IMAX, Dolby Cinema, 4DX, and ScreenX formats. Paramount Pictures handles worldwide distribution for the film, except for the theatrical releases in Canada and the United Kingdom, which are handled by Entertainment One. The film also had several promotional advanced screenings before the theatrical release.

The film was originally set to be released on July 23, 2021. The release date subsequently shifted to November 19, 2021, to accommodate the original release day of Mission: Impossible – Dead Reckoning Part One, before being pushed back further to May 27, 2022, due to the COVID-19 pandemic. In April 2021, the release date was further delayed to March 3, 2023. On April 21, 2022, the official title of the film was announced as Dungeons & Dragons: Honor Among Thieves. In November 2022, the film's release was once again pushed back to March 31, 2023.

=== Home media ===
Dungeons & Dragons: Honor Among Thieves was released by Paramount Home Entertainment for digital download on May 2, 2023, and began streaming on Paramount+ and MGM+ on May 16 and 26, respectively. It was released on Ultra HD Blu-ray, Blu-ray, and DVD on May 30. The home media includes deleted scenes, a gag reel, and various behind-the-scenes featurettes.

== Marketing ==
=== Promotion ===
In July 2022, Honor Among Thieves was featured at San Diego Comic-Con (SDCC); this included a panel with members of the cast and crew and a "Tavern Experience". The "Tavern Experience" showcased characters of the film. A teaser trailer was released on July 21, 2022, on the same date as the film's SDCC panel. Its soundtrack has excerpts from Led Zeppelin's "Whole Lotta Love". The "Tavern Experience" was then featured at CCXP in December 2022 and showcased various monsters from Dungeons & Dragons. A TV spot for the film was expected to air during Super Bowl LVII; this promotion was released online before the game. Paramount released a short video on YouTube featuring characters from the 1983 Dungeons & Dragons animated series reacting to a clip of Doric transforming into an owlbear.

=== Tie-in literature and merchandise ===
A prequel publishing campaign following various of the film's characters began in February 2023 before the release of Honor Among Thieves. Doric is the main character in the young adult novel The Druid's Call (2023) by E.K. Johnston, and The Road to Neverwinter (2023) adult novel by Jaleigh Johnson focuses on Edgin Darvis. Dungeons & Dragons: Honor Among Thieves—The Feast of the Moon is a 96-page prequel graphic novel which focuses on Edgin and his band of thieves with a back-up story focused on Xenk and the Helmet of Disjunction. It was written by Jeremy Lambert and Ellen Boener and drawn by Eduardo Ferigato and Guillermo Sanna.

The Dungeons & Dragons adventure anthology Keys from the Golden Vault (2023) features a heist set in Revel's End—a maximum-security prison location created for the movie—which is located in the fictional Icewind Dale. While created for the movie, it first appeared in the adventure module Icewind Dale: Rime of the Frostmaiden (2020). Wizards of the Coast also released playable Dungeons & Dragons stat blocks for the film's main characters as a free promotion on D&D Beyond.

Additionally, Hasbro released promotional toys and other merchandise based on the film, such as Monopoly, Dicelings, and Golden Archive action figures. (Note: Attributed to multiple references.)

== Reception ==
=== Box office ===
Dungeons & Dragons: Honor Among Thieves grossed $93.3 million in the United States and Canada, and $114.9 million in other territories, for a worldwide total of $208.2 million.

After the premiere at South by Southwest, A.A. Dowd at Chron noted that "the reaction at the Paramount Theatre last night suggests that this could be a bigger hit than plenty have predicted, if word of its canny exploitation of the Marvel model travels fast and far." In the United States and Canada, Dungeons & Dragons: Honor Among Thieves was released alongside A Thousand and One and His Only Son, and was projected to $30–40 million from 3,850 theaters in its opening weekend. The film made $15.2 million on its first day, which included $5.6 million in advance screenings in the week leading up to its release, with $4.1 million coming from Thursday previews. It went on to debut to $37.2 million, topping the box office; 61% of the opening weekend audience was male and 63% was between 18 and 34 years old. The film made $13.9 million in its second weekend (a drop of 62%), finishing in third. In its third weekend, the film grossed $7.5 million, a decline of 46% from the previous weekend. Kayleena Pierce-Bohen of Screen Rant called the film a "box office bomb" and said that the film's disappointing profits were due to poor marketing of the film, tough competition with The Super Mario Bros. Movie, and the fans boycotting the companies Wizards of the Coast and Hasbro.

Outside of the US and Canada, the film grossed $33 million from 60 markets in its first weekend. In its second weekend, Honor Among Thieves grossed $15.5 million, for a drop of 45%. The film earned another $13.8 million from 64 markets in its third weekend.

=== Critical response ===
On the review aggregator website Rotten Tomatoes, 91% of 318 critics' reviews are positive, with an average rating of 7.4/10. The website's consensus reads: "An infectiously good-spirited comedy with a solid emotional core, Dungeons & Dragons: Honor Among Thieves offers fun fantasy and adventure even if you don't know your HP from your OP." Metacritic, which uses a weighted average, assigned the film a score of 72 out of 100, based on 57 critics, indicating "generally favorable" reviews. Audiences surveyed by CinemaScore gave the film an average grade of "A−" on an A+ to F scale, while those polled by PostTrak gave it a 90% positive score, with 77% saying they would definitely recommend it.

Nicholas Barber, for BBC, stated that "fantasy adventures might be getting ever more gloomy and portentous on television, but the producers of Dungeons & Dragons: Honour Among Thieves have followed the Marvel Studios tactic of hiring comedy directors to make a blockbuster [...]. The film they've made is a feelgood, family-friendly caper, which is not a description you can apply to HBO's House of the Dragon or Amazon's The Rings of Power". Barber commented that Goldstein and Daley went for "a bright, snappy heist movie" instead of "an epic odyssey". Christian Holub, for Entertainment Weekly, highlighted that adapting the Dungeons & Dragons game is different from adapting "novels by J.R.R. Tolkien or George R.R. Martin" as "the goal is to capture an experience rather than a specific story—and Dungeons & Dragons: Honor Among Thieves delightfully nails the fun of role-playing as fantasy characters with your friends". Rafael Motamayor, for Polygon, commented that the film feels like the "latest session" in a years-long Dungeons & Dragons campaign and that Honor Among Thieves "does a great job of capturing the different tones players might experience in their own campaigns, from horror to campy fun, and from epic high fantasy to a thrilling heist". Linda Codega of Io9 called it a "solid film"—"the comedy is a little rushed, but the jokes all land" and "the characters mostly come together as charming iterations of classic D&D classes". John Kirk at Original Cin wrote that Dungeons & Dragons is a "shared and collaborative storytelling" game where the players via role-playing "respond to a presented setting and antagonists and other characters by the Dungeon Master. Dungeons & Dragons: Honor Among Thieves manages to present all of these aspects so well that you can see the D&D players in the audience actually miming the rolling of dice".

Benjamin Lee, for The Guardian, wrote that "the script does a solid job of making it an accessible world to those not already steeped in it although Goldstein and Daley, writing alongside Michael Gilio, are less effective with the film's many attempts at comedy. It's a shame as the cast are game and Pine and Rodriguez have a fizzy platonic chemistry but it's just never as funny as it should be despite ample set-ups". G. Allen Johnson at the San Francisco Chronicle asserted, "Dungeons & Dragons: Honor Among Thieves feels like Daley and Goldstein, who also co-wrote with Michael Gilio, asked ChatGPT, the artificial intelligence chatbot developed by OpenAI: 'Write a Marvel movie except with Dungeons & Dragons characters.' Seconds later, this spit out." Katie Walsh at the Los Angeles Times opined that "Aside from its clunky title, Dungeon[s] & Dragons: Honor Among Thieves has a relaxed, loose energy that puts the viewer at ease" and "yet there is some ineffable quality lacking—perhaps an emulsifying ingredient—that prevents all these elements (the stars, the lore, the creatures) from coming together into something truly magical. Maybe on the next roll of the 20-sided die." Glen Weldon, for NPR, commented that "the film's plot is purely, ruthlessly episodic—it comes down to a series of fetch quests [...]. But to complain about the number of fetch quests in a D&D film would be like complaining that a movie about Scrabble features too much spelling". Richard Lawson, for Vanity Fair, also highlighted that the film is structured around a series of quests and the "new sidekicks" who are picked up along the way. Lawson wrote that "the film is stuffed with all manner of mythology and moves at frenzied pace, sometimes wobbling in its speed and density but usually regaining control just before things topple into irksome incoherence".

On the cast, Weldon highlighted that Pine's Edgin is "a character who not only rides the razor's edge between charm and smarm but who sets up housekeeping there" and Grant's Forge evokes similar smarm to Grant's character in Paddington 2. He commented that "Rodriguez doesn't get the chance to do a lot that you haven't seen Michelle Rodriguez do before, but she remains great at it" and Page as a paladin "nails the necessary hauteur and supreme confidence while layering them with a guileless sincerity that turns his character into a weapon aimed at Pine's character's every insecurity". Holub highlighted that the cast "seem to be having fun" and "what's especially welcome about the humor in Honor Among Thieves is that it doesn't wink or mock its material; the characters just say funny things and bounce off each other as organically as a real-life friend group". Codega stated that "there's not a poor performance out of the group". However, Johnson felt that characters were "thinly written and predictable" resulting in the actors "playing pleasing versions of themselves. They are merely foreground; it's the green screens behind them that provide the manufactured magic". Multiple critics referred to the character of Xenk as an "NPC" who helped move the plot along. In terms of visuals, Barber highlighted that neither the architecture nor the clothing are attempting to evoke a specific "historical period" but instead "the designers simply stick in whichever castles and costumes seem cool". Barber was more critical of the film's special effects stating that the CGI "doesn't convince you for a second that the characters are in an actual dungeon or facing an actual dragon". In contrast, Codega praised the blend of practical effects and VFX. Kirk commended the film's CGI stating that "the magic is rich, and the effects do not disappoint". Motamayor also highlighted the unique "portrayal of magic" in the film.

=== Accolades ===
Award	Date of ceremony	Category	Recipient	Result	Ref
Golden Trailer Awards	June 29, 2023	Best Fantasy Adventure	"Ironic" (AV Squad)	Nominated	
Golden Trailer Awards	June 29, 2023	Best Fantasy Adventure TV Spot (for a Feature Film)	"Island 30 TV Spot" (Silk Creative)	Nominated	
Golden Trailer Awards	June 29, 2023	Best Voice-Over TV Spot (for a Feature Film)	"Epic Quote" (Silk Factory)	Nominated	
Golden Trailer Awards	June 29, 2023	Best Action Poster	"One Sheet" (WORKS ADV)	Nominated	
Golden Trailer Awards	June 29, 2023	Best Sound Editing in a TV Spot (for a Feature Film)	"Sound" (AV Squad)	Won	
Golden Trailer Awards	June 29, 2023	Best Digital – Comedy	Dungeons & Dragons: Honor Among Thieves	Nominated	
Golden Trailer Awards	June 29, 2023	Best Digital – Action	Dungeons & Dragons: Honor Among Thieves	Nominated	
Hollywood Critics Association Midseason Film Awards	June 30, 2023	Best Stunts	Dungeons & Dragons: Honor Among Thieves	Nominated	
Astra Film and Creative Awards	January 6, 2024	Best Action Feature	Dungeons & Dragons: Honor Among Thieves	Nominated	
Astra Film and Creative Awards	February 26, 2024	Best Stunts	Dungeons & Dragons: Honor Among Thieves	Nominated	
Astra Film and Creative Awards	February 26, 2024	Best Hair and Make-up	Alessandro Bertolazzi, Cristina Waltz, and Ryo Murakawa	Nominated	
Saturn Awards	February 4, 2024	Best Fantasy Film	Dungeons & Dragons: Honor Among Thieves	Nominated	
Visual Effects Society Awards	February 21, 2024	Outstanding Visual Effects in a Photoreal Feature	Ben Snow, Diana Giorgiutti, Khalid Almeerani, Scott Benza, Sam Conway	Nominated	
Hugo Award	August 11, 2024	Best Dramatic Presentation (Long Form)	John Francis Daley (director, screenplay), Jonathan Goldstein (director, screenplay), Michael Gilio (screenplay)	Won	

== Future ==
=== Possible sequel ===
In an interview with Polygon in April 2023 on the potential for a film sequel, Daley stated that "it was never our intention when we came on board this film to make a franchise". Goldstein commented that they would continue with the characters established in Honor Among Thieves if they returned to the D&D world—"the audience knows them, and you can jump into the plot more quickly. And obviously, we have great affection for both the actors and these roles that they play. But we'd want to introduce some new figures along the way".

In July 2023, Paramount Pictures CEO Brian Robbins stated in an interview with Variety that a sequel could still happen, on the condition that it be produced on a smaller budget due to the disappointing box-office reception of the film. In July 2026, Jonathan Goldstein revealed that a sequel had been written but might not be made due to unspecified financial reasons.

=== Spin-off television series ===
In February 2022, a spin-off television series was announced to be in development. A part of a "multi-pronged approach" for television projects, the show is described as the "flagship" and "cornerstone" live-action series of the multiple projects in development; while the series is to "complement" the film side of the franchise. Drew Crevello was set to serve as executive producer and showrunner for the series, while Rawson Marshall Thurber wrote and was set to direct the pilot episode. Various networks and streaming companies bid on distribution rights. In January 2023, it was announced that Paramount+ gave the show a straight-to-series order that consists of eight episodes, with Entertainment One (eOne) and Paramount Pictures serving as the production companies. However, in May 2024, Paramount+ announced that they were no longer moving forward with the series. Deadline reported that the series will now be overseen "by Hasbro's in-house division Hasbro Entertainment following eOne's December 2023 sale to Lionsgate" with a new creative team and "will undergo a creative update before being taken out to other potential buyers".

== Bibliography ==
- Simonpillai, Radheyan (March 27, 2023). "Dungeons & Dragons: Honor Among Thieves rolls the 20-sided dice and wins". The Globe and Mail.
