= Harpers (Forgotten Realms organization) =

Fictional Dungeons & Dragons organization

The Harpers are a fictional and semi-secret organization in the Forgotten Realms campaign setting of the role playing game Dungeons & Dragons.

== Publication history ==
The Harpers were introduced in 1987 as part of the Forgotten Realms campaign setting, as written by Ed Greenwood. The Code of the Harpers (1993), also written by Greenwood, is a resource book for runes, spells, and other unique abilities only Harpers have.

== Organization ==
The organization was created near the founding of Myth Drannor by elven elders, generals, and priests, and led by an elven mage named "Lady Steel" (and advised by a young Elminster). Over time, and after the fall of Myth Drannor, this organization evolved into a new group, founded by Elminster and other influential and powerful individuals, with support from many freedom loving and good-aligned deities and churches (although the churches don't always agree with Harper aims, the deities themselves do). The deities who sponsored the Harpers are; Deneir, Eldath, Liira, Mielikki, Milil, Mystra, Oghma, Selune, Silvanus, Tymora, and the entire Seldarine. Most of the Seven Sisters, especially Storm Silverhand, are dedicated Harpers.

Pushing for balance as well as what is right, they oppose all evil organizations such as the Zhentarim and the Red Wizards of Thay. The Harpers strive for many small, allied kingdoms, keeping rulers close to their people and too occupied with actively helping their subjects to be concerned with making war and conquering their neighbors. They are also concerned with maintaining a balance between nature and civilization, keeping woodlands and other natural areas safe from too much destruction, and with preserving all knowledge and learning, especially history, music and art. They recruit a variety of people, but the majority tend to be human, elven, and half-elven rangers and bards (people who are free to roam around a lot); there are more female than male Harpers. Harper members are recognizable by their magically imbued silver pins, which grant various magical protections (such as immunity to electricity, and to magic missiles).

Harpers are hated in many countries such as Thay or Tethyr, for a variety of reasons, but especially for their vehement opposition to the practice of slavery. The Tethyrian government has a grudge against the Harpers for assassinating their last recognized leader, driving the country of Tethyr into a swirling chaos of civil war and assassinations. However, the Harpers were framed by another, unknown, secret organization.

In 1371DR - The Year of the Unstrung Harp (1 year previously to the start of the 3rd edition campaign) - there has been growing divisions between the Harpers who wished to further the cause of Balance (neutral-aligned) and those who wished to combat evil (good-aligned). A schism happened after the Harper Khelben "Blackstaff" Arunsun made a deal with Fzoul Chembryl, leader of the Zhentarim. He was expelled from the Harpers, and, with his wife Laeral Silverhand of the Seven Sisters, he went on to form the Harper splinter organization known as the Moonstars.

== Other media ==
=== Baldur's Gate ===
The Harpers are part of the plot of the Forgotten Realms computer game Baldur's Gate.

=== Baldur's Gate II: Shadows of Amn ===
The Harpers play an important role in Baldur's Gate II: Shadows of Amn.

=== Baldur's Gate 3 ===
The Harpers can be either allies or enemies to the characters in Baldur's Gate 3.

=== Film ===
In the 2023 film Dungeons & Dragons: Honor Among Thieves, Edgin is a former member of the Harpers.

== Reception ==
Jonathan Palmer for Arcane magazine commented on the Harpers as "fighters for freedom and justice. Laudable."

== Additional sources ==
- Greenwood, Ed. The Code of the Harpers (TSR, 1993), ISBN 1-56076-644-1
- Grubb, Jeff and Ed Greenwood. Forgotten Realms Adventures (TSR, 1990).
