= Villains' Lorebook =

Role-playing game accessory

- Genre: Role-playing games
- Publisher: TSR

Villains' Lorebook is an accessory for the Forgotten Realms campaign setting for the second edition of the Advanced Dungeons & Dragons fantasy role-playing game.

== Contents ==
The 160-page book features a two-page introduction, which explains that this book is companion volume to Heroes' Lorebook. The book compiles information from novels and other sources, as well as 1989's Hall of Heroes. The book describes 29 characters, each including an illustration, game statistics, suggestions for campaign uses, and a list of the sources consulted for each character's entry. Character descriptions appear on pages 6–59, and include such notables as Artemis Entreri, Elaith Craulnober, Fzoul Chembryl, Halaster Blackcloak, Jarlaxle, Kymil Nimesin, Manshoon, and Szass Tam. The book's center 16-page section (pages 81–96) presents a series of color illustrations depicting many of the characters described in the book in a variety of scenes. Pages 60–106 provides game statistics and descriptions for several monsters, as well as notable individual creatures like Errtu, Kazgaroth, and Tyranthraxus. A number of organizations are described on pages 107-126, such as the Cult of the Dragon, the Drow of Menzoberranzan, the Red Wizards of Thay, and the Zhentarim. A number of magical items and spells are described on pages 127-157. A list of sources mentioned throughout the book can be found on pages 159 and 160.

== Publication history ==
The book, with product code TSR 9552, was published in July 1998, and was written by Dale Donovan. Cover art was by Todd Lockwood and interior art by David Martin, Fred Fields, Keith Parkinson, Jeff Easley, and Jennell Jaquays. (Note: Credited as Paul Jaquays.)

== Reviews ==
- Casus Belli #116
- Backstab #11
