= Mystra =

Mystra may refer to

- Mystra, a Byzantine city and archaeological site in Greece today known as Mystras
- Mystra (Forgotten Realms), a deity in the Dungeons and Dragons game universe Forgotten Realms
