= Elminster Enraged =

2012 novel by Ed Greenwood

- Cover of the first edition
- Author: Ed Greenwood
- Language: English
- Genre: Fantasy novel
- Published: 2012
- Publication place: United States
- Media type: Print (Paperback)
- ISBN: 978-0-7869-6029-3
- Preceded by: Bury Elminster Deep

Elminster Enraged is a fantasy novel by Ed Greenwood, set in the world of the Forgotten Realms, and based on the Dungeons & Dragons role-playing game. It is the eighth novel in "The Elminster Series". It was published in hardcover in August 2012.

== Plot summary ==
Elminster battles Manshoon despite Mystra's wishes that they work together. The battle causes Elminster to fall into the Underdark as a cloud of ashes, and he inhabits the body of a fallen drow to carry out Mystra's orders. Manshoon plans to conquer Cormyr and become its emperor.

== Reception ==
Dan Ruffalo of "The Ranting Dragon" commented that Elminster Enraged was "a great book, despite the fact that the rage made little more than a brief cameo. Elminster is an excellent character, and Greenwood writes him very well and very consistently (a feat, considering he first appeared in print twenty-five years ago). As a story, it was quite enjoyable. It is a little tough, as somebody who spent so much time in the main chronology of the Forgotten Realms, to keep track of everything happening now nearly 100 years later in Realms time, but it was worth it." Another reviewer commented: "The ending is great fun, it bumped this from 4 to 5 stars. Elminster gets well.. enraged. Its a lot of fun, stick with the jumps, and you'll come to a conclusion that had me smiling as a reader, as a fan of Ed's, and definitely as a fan of the Realms".

James Marchese of "The Voice" called the book "a complete disappointment", stating that "it hurts me to say that there isn't really much I can complement this book on. The only thing that really pleased me about it was the transformation that Elminster went through in the book. He turns from a happy-go-lucky mage to a spiteful old sorcerer. However, like everything else in the book it meant nothing because at the end of the book he goes back to being his normal self like nothing even happened to him."
