= The Elminster Series =

Fantasy novel series by Ed Greenwood

The Elminster Series is a series of fantasy novels by Ed Greenwood set in the Forgotten Realms setting, which was created by Greenwood for the Dungeons & Dragons fantasy role-playing game. The series focuses on the character Elminster, a powerful wizard who is a key figure in the setting. This series presents the character's backstory and provides readers with details of events in the setting's history.

== Works included ==
- Elminster - The Making of a Mage (1994); ISBN 0786902035
- Elminster In Myth Drannor (1997); ISBN 0786911905
- The Temptation of Elminster (1998); ISBN 0786914270
- Elminster In Hell (2001); ISBN 0786927461
- Elminster's Daughter (2004); ISBN 0786937688
- The Annotated Elminster (2007) – An anthology of the first three books in the series.
- Elminster Must Die (2010) – The debut 4th Edition appearance of one of the Forgotten Realms world's most iconic characters. ISBN 0786957999
- Bury Elminster Deep (2011) ISBN 0786960248
- Elminster Enraged (2012) ISBN 0786963638
- The Herald (2014) ISBN 078696460X
- Spellstorm (2015) ISBN 0786965711
- Death Masks (2016) ISBN 0-7869-6593-2

== Plot summary ==
=== Elminster: The Making of a Mage ===
As a young boy, tending sheep in the fertile countryside of the nation of Athlanthar, Elminster has his first encounter with magic: the destruction of his entire hometown by a vicious dragon-riding magelord. The only survivor of the tragedy, Elminster joins a troupe of bandits and later a gang of thieves in the nearby city of Hastarl. Fed up with the rule and power of arrogant mages, Elminster sneaks into a temple of Mystra with the intent of defacing it, leading to a face-to-face confrontation with the goddess. Instead of unleashing her wrath upon the upstart youth, she questions him; based upon his wise and honest answers and his exceptional potential, Mystra instructs Elminster in the ways of magic. He becomes a powerful cleric and mage, one of her Chosen – a title rarely given and accompanied by a host of powers and duties.

=== Elminster in Myth Drannor ===
After winning the freedom of Athlanthar from the power-mad magelords, becoming king, and subsequently abdicating his throne, Elminster follows the edict of Mystra to enter the forest of Cormanthor. Stumbling upon a patrol of elves beset by monsters, he rescues the sole survivor and comforts him in his dying moments. Given a sacred duty to return the family's mind stone (kiira) to its rightful place, he sneaks into the City of Cormanthor under threat of death (as elves will kill any non-elves in Cormanthor on sight) to return the kiira and complete his vow. Though not accepted by most of the noble caste, Elminster convinces the ruling Coronal and the powerful guardian of the forest, the Shrinshee, to trust and teach him. Surviving many tests of strength and will, as well as attempts at assassination, he learns powerful elven magic and plays a large part in the eventual seeding of Cormanthor's Mythal.

=== The Temptation of Elminster ===
Tempted by Mystra and Shar, Elminster must choose to follow his heart or his goddess.

=== Elminster in Hell ===
Thrown through a portal into the Hell-plane of Avernos, Elminster is captured by the outcast archdevil Nergal and struggles to survive his memories being replayed and torn from his mind.

=== Elminster's Daughter ===
Through the lens of Elminster's daughter, Narnra, a thief from Waterdeep, the novel examines the long-term effect of Elminster's meddling with the nation of Cormyr, which he helped create and protect.

=== Elminster Must Die ===
When the goddess of magic is murdered, Elminster's world shatters. Once the most powerful wizard in the world, he is now a tired old man; his habit of saving the world has resulted in a number of enemies. Elminster is also feeding powerful magic items to the Simbul, his lover, to keep her sane, but collecting these items leads his enemies to him.

== Reception ==
Elminster in Hell was reviewed by Don Bassingthwaite in the Winter 2002 issue of Black Gate.

Bury Elminster Deep received a positive review from California Bookwatch, which called it "a top pick for any fantasy collection".

The Elminster Series appeared on the 2025 Screen Rant "10 Best Forgotten Realms Book Series, Ranked" list at #9.
