= The Complete Bard's Handbook =

The Complete Bard's Handbook is a 1992 role-playing game supplement published by TSR for Advanced Dungeons & Dragons.

== Contents ==
The Complete Bard's Handbook is a supplement in which a comprehensive guide expands the bard class with new creation rules, seventeen kits, proficiencies, abilities, magic, and hundreds of instruments.

== Reviews ==
- Abyss Quarterly #50 (Winter, 1992)
- Saga (Issue 15 - Aug 1992)
