= Elminster =

Character in Dungeons & Dragons fantasy

Elminster Aumar
- Forgotten Realms character

In-universe information
- Race: Human
- Gender: Male
- Class: Fighter/Rogue/Cleric/Wizard/Archmage
- Alignment: Chaotic good
- Home: Athalantar, Shadowdale

Elminster Aumar is a fictional character appearing in the Forgotten Realms campaign setting for the Dungeons & Dragons fantasy role-playing game. He is also known as the Sage of Shadowdale, and is depicted as a powerful wizard featured in several novels by Forgotten Realms creator Ed Greenwood. Certain aspects of his appearance and demeanor seem to echo Gandalf, Merlin, or Odin.

Elminster was one of the first characters that Greenwood created for the Forgotten Realms. Information about him can be found in virtually all Forgotten Realms game products, but the novels in The Elminster Series are perhaps the most definitive sources of information. The series includes Elminster: The Making of a Mage, Elminster in Myth Drannor, The Temptation of Elminster, Elminster in Hell, and Elminster's Daughter.

== Basics ==
=== Appearance ===
Elminster appears as a gray-bearded man of weathered visage, with a hawk-like nose and alert, dancing eyes. He speaks in a gruff tone and generally wears nondescript attire. He is almost always smoking a meerschaum pipe that spouts vile-smelling blue or green smoke.

=== Personality ===
Elminster is normally a witty, clever, and very charming man. He can, however, be imperious, grave, and terrible. Furthermore, he is a natural storyteller and a consummate actor. He rarely reveals the full extent of his true nature to anyone who is not an extremely close friend. He can portray himself as a trickster, rake, stern father figure, fool, or any other stereotype that he wants to assume, depending on what he wants to accomplish or what reaction he wants to elicit from those around him.

=== Family ===
Readers learn that Elminster has several daughters at the end of Elminster's Daughter. Besides Narnra Shalace, two others are Laspeera of the War Wizards and the dowager queen Filfaeril of Cormyr. He has no known wife, but retains contact with several previous lovers, including the goddess Mystra — although his relationship with Mystra changed when the goddess was slain during the Time of Troubles and the sorceress Midnight assumed the mantle of the Lady of Mysteries.

=== Allies ===
Elminster's allies included the Harpers, the other Chosen of Mystra (especially the Simbul), and his scribe Lhaeo. The Knights of Myth Drannor were also close friends and confidants, and two or three knights were always in Shadowdale in case it was in peril.

== Media ==
In Dragon Magazine articles written by Ed Greenwood, Elminster often appeared as a wise sage imparting knowledge to a fictional interviewer. He divulged lore on various Dungeons & Dragons monsters in "The ecology of ..." articles, such as "The ecology of the ochre jelly". He was used as a source of information for Greenwood's "Pages from the Mages" articles, in which various spells were described, as well as various miscellaneous articles such as "Cloaked in magic".

"The Wizards Three", a series of short fiction pieces in Dragon, featured Elminster holding meetings with wizards from other Dungeons & Dragons settings. The metafictional conceit central to the series was that, unbeknownst to the other wizards, the meetings were being held in the home of real-world author Ed Greenwood. Greenwood himself was included in the stories as a character, sequestered in hidden locations in order to eavesdrop and take the notes from which the stories were supposedly written later.

== Novels ==
=== The Making of a Mage ===
The first novel in The Elminster Series, The Making of a Mage, recounts the character's origin story, which explains why he has such extensive and varied experience. Elminster was born around 212 DR to Elthryn, the lord of the village of Heldon and a prince of Athalantar, and his wife Amrythale, in the kingdom of Athalantar. His family was killed by a malaugrym posing as Undarl, one of the magelords of the ancient kingdom of Athalantar. Taking up his father's broken sword, the Lion Sword, the symbol of the great king of the Stag Throne (who was Elminster's grandfather), Elminster became a brigand.

He soon realized that he had no taste for killing, and gave it up when he went to become a burglar in the city of Hastarl, the capital of Athalantar. He met and became friends with Farl, a local thief, who knew Elminster as Eladar "the Dark". They worked together frequently, eventually forming a gang dubbed the Velvet Hands in opposition to another local gang, the Moonclaws, who were servants of the magelords. Later, while eavesdropping on a possible thieving mark, Elminster met that era's Magister, the wizard who bore the mantle of Azuth's power. When asked if he was interested in learning sorcery, Elminster refused, hating all mages because of the magelords.

While in a temple, Elminster was visited by Mystra, the Goddess of All Magic. She spoke to and left the awestruck Elminster with the message that he should learn of magic and worship her. Soon thereafter, while he was still a young adult, Mystra transformed Elminster into a woman named Elmara to strengthen his bond with magic and to know what it is to be a woman. This change also allowed him to move within his enemies' circles without their knowledge that he was in fact the last surviving prince of Athalantar. For a few years, Elmara was a priestess of Mystra. Later, an avatar of Mystra (who went by the name Myrjala "Darkeyes") trained Elmara in the ways of a mage and brought her to an ancient Netherese arcanist who taught Elmara a spell that would transform her back into Elminster. In the time that followed, Elminster learned much about magic from Myrjala, reaching the point where he could finish taking his revenge against the evil magelords who had usurped the kingdom. After a terrific battle, Elminster persevered and assumed the throne of Athalantar.

However, after regaining his kingdom, he passed the monarchy to Helm Stoneblade, a knight of Athalantar, stating that he had wanted to avenge his family's death, not rule. As he and Myrjala left the kingdom, the so-called Mage Royal, Undarl, attacked them, and the sorceress revealed herself to be Mystra. She offered to make Elminster one of her Chosen, and he readily accepted.

=== Elminster in Myth Drannor ===
A sequel to Making of a Mage, Elminster in Myth Drannor takes place shortly afterwards. In this novel, Elminster travels to the city of Cormanthor. The book details the ancient elven society and its people, as well as highlighting Elminster's continued magical studies, as he serves as an apprentice to a cruel and powerful wizard.

Elminster remains in Cormanthor for over two decades, and is present when the mythal is raised and the city is renamed Myth Drannor.

=== The Temptation of Elminster ===
The Temptation of Elminster moves the timeline ahead several centuries. At the outset of the novel, Elminster emerges from a dusty tomb, after being trapped there in stasis for many years.

During much of this book, Elminster restricts his use of magic (on orders from Mystra), and he must again learn to survive by his wits and the skills he picked up earlier in his life. He later undergoes further magical training under the tutelage of a wicked sorceress who seeks to tempt him away from Mystra's path.

Following the events of the novel, Elminster served as a foster parent to three of Mystra's other Chosen: Laeral, Storm, and Dove. It is also suspected that he had something to do with the founding of Waterdeep, or at least with the organizing of the city's lords.

=== The Time of Troubles ===
Elminster was instrumental in forming the Rangers Three, who aided him in recurring battles with the mysterious Shadowmasters during this time. Elminster also took time to defend Shadowdale from an army of Zhentarim led by the avatar of Bane. Bane and Elminster battled, and both were caught up in the spell that Elminster had called upon to dispose of the avatar. Elminster was originally thought to have been destroyed, but when he later reappeared it became apparent that he had merely been transported to another plane of existence for a time.

=== The Avatar Crisis ===
The forces of evil tried to rally in Elminster's absence, but the other Chosen, the Knights of Myth Drannor, and the Rangers Three held them at bay until he returned. With the present crisis averted, all seemed calm, but the Shadowmasters had other ideas. Elminster and the Rangers Three, along with their allies, managed to frustrate and foil the plans of this race of shapeshifters.

Elminster also confronted the overgod, Lord Ao, over his instigation of the Time of Troubles while innocents were being killed. As the critical moment of the Time of Troubles approached, Mystra knew of what was to come and shed most of her power into the human wizard Midnight, so that all of her essence would not cease to exist. Since Elminster obtained his power from Mystra, this change left him personally powerless at a critical juncture.

He recruited one of the Rangers Three, Sharantyr, and they equipped themselves from Elminster's cache of magical items. The two of them were later reunited with the other two members of the band, Itharr and Belkram, but even the Rangers Three could not prevent Elminster from being wounded in battle. Despite this setback, Elminster and the rangers, along with their allies, freed High Dale and defeated Manshoon of the Zhentarim. They also outlasted the Time of Troubles, and Elminster regained his magic.

=== Elminster in Hell ===
Elminster in Hell describes what happened after the floating city of Shade returned to Faerûn from the Plane of Shadow. The immortal rulers of the city came to Shadowdale, and one of the shadow princes was struck by Storm's silver fire. The collision tore at the fabric of reality and created a rift to the Nine Hells. Elminster realized that the only way to close the portal before a legion of devils spilled forth onto Toril was to close it from the other side.

In the opening of Elminster in Hell, Elminster narrowly managed to close the portal at the expense of much of his magical strength. Once in Hell he was abducted and enslaved by an outcast Arch-Devil known as Nergal, who wished to discover the secret of Mystra's silver fire. In the most graphic scenes of The Elminster Series, Elminster was subjected to brutal tortures, surviving only because of his exceptional endurance and ability to heal himself with silver fire. While the arch-fiend plundered Elminster's thoughts and memories, Mystra became aware of her favorite servant's plight and entered Hell herself to find him. Realizing that her presence in Hell was less than inconspicuous, due to the Pact Primeval that prohibits the presence of any god in the Nine Hells, Mystra retreated and dispatched more subtle agents to find him; first Halaster Blackcloak, the Mad Mage of Undermountain (who was defeated) and then the Simbul. After much searching, the Simbul found him, and together they defeated Nergal and returned home.

=== Elminster's Daughter ===
Elminster's Daughter takes place a few years after Elminster in Hell. A relatively light-hearted book when compared to the more violent Elminster in Hell, it focuses primarily on the life of one of Elminster's children, Narnra Shalace.

Narnra is a thief who was raised by a single mother in Waterdeep. She eventually finds her way to Marsember and becomes involved in the intrigues of the Cormyrean nation. She also meets an old man who turns out to be Elminster, and learns that he is her father.

== Effects of the Spellplague ==
Following the events of the Spellplague caused by the destruction of his patron, Mystra, Elminster lost much of his power but remained unaging. He continued to live in Shadowdale, but he became bitter and withdrawn.

== Other media ==
=== Video games ===
Elminster is a featured character in the Advanced Dungeons & Dragons "gold box" game Pools of Darkness, where he serves as the primary foil to the god Bane, who plots to steal the cities of the Realms. Elminster aids the player's party from Limbo, offering advice and direction and shuttling them back and forth between the dimensions they must travel in order to undo Bane's plot. He also serves as a trainer, equipment store and healer to the party. In the final climactic battle, Elminster is captured by the balor Gothmenes and dragged from Limbo to be used as a bargaining chip for the crystal of Bane, which the party has stolen. Elminster breaks free of the balor's whip and battles him, only to be swept into the Abyss as the party defeats Bane's minions. When the party finally crushes Gothmenes, Elminster is rescued from the Abyss as the gods return reality to normal. He makes a final appearance to thank the party for rescuing him and implies that they are the only ones with knowledge of how close the Realms came to falling under Bane.

In the Baldur's Gate role-playing video game series, Elminster made brief and sporadic appearances to check on the protagonist's progress and impart words of wisdom. In Baldur's Gate 3, he is part of the companion mission of Gale of Waterdeep, acting as an emissary between Mystra and Gale when the goddess needs to consult him (he appears as a simulacrum - a duplicate of the real Elminster created by magic, as opposed to actually appearing in person).

Elminster was added to Dungeons & Dragons Online in the Menace of the Underdark expansion.

In Neverwinter Online, Elminster ran the store for the "Protector's Jubilee" event. He also appeared as the primary quest giver in "Well of Dragons".

=== Comic books ===
Elminster is involved in the story arc "Dragonreach" in the Forgotten Realms comics. He assists another wizard, Dwalimor Omen, in stopping an individual who was slaying dragons in the Realms.

== Reception ==
In the Io9 series revisiting older Dungeons & Dragons novels, Rob Bricken describes Elminster as "the most powerful, important, and smartest wizard in the Forgotten Realms, and one of the setting's most important characters [...] more Merlin than Gandalf, which makes him less enigmatic and prone to tomfoolery than other major fantasy wizards, which I count as a good thing."
