= Elminster in Hell =

2001 novel by Ed Greenwood

- Cover of the first edition
- Author: Ed Greenwood
- Language: English
- Series: The Elminster Series
- Genre: Fantasy novel
- Published: 2001
- Publication place: United States
- Media type: Print (Paperback)
- Preceded by: The Temptation of Elminster
- Followed by: Elminster's Daughter

Elminster in Hell is a fantasy novel by the Canadian writer Ed Greenwood, set in the Forgotten Realms, the setting that he created for the Dungeons & Dragons role-playing game.

The novel is structured as an epistolary novel but instead of letters there are the memories, of which Nergal robs Elminster, interspersed by short mental dialogues between the two, showing the ironic and provocative personality of the Old Mage, which often in a more or less subtle way mocks the arch-fiend, knowing full well that it will bring more pain.

== Plot ==
Elminster attempts to close a planar rift which connects Toril to Avernus of the Nine Hells, to prevent devils from invading, but he is captured and tortured by the outcast archdevil Nergal until Mystra sends her most powerful agents to rescue him.

== Reviews ==
- Review by Don Bassingthwaite (2002) in Black Gate, Winter 2002
