= The Temptation of Elminster =

Book by Ed Greenwood

- Cover of the first edition
- Author: Ed Greenwood
- Language: English
- Genre: Fantasy novel
- Published: 1998 (hardcover); 1999 (paperback)
- Publication place: United States
- Media type: Print (hardcover and paperback)
- ISBN: 978-0-7869-1189-9 (hardcover); 978-0-7869-1427-2 (paperback)
- Preceded by: Elminster in Myth Drannor
- Followed by: Elminster in Hell

The Temptation of Elminster is a fantasy novel by Ed Greenwood, set in the world of the Forgotten Realms, and based on the Dungeons & Dragons role-playing game. It is the third novel in The Elminster Series. It was published in hardcover in December 1998, and in paperback in November 1999.

An audiobook, narrated by John Pruden and produced by Audible, was released in 2013.

== Plot summary ==
The Temptation of Elminster moves the time line ahead several centuries. At the outset of the novel, Elminster emerges from a dusty tomb, after being trapped there in stasis for many years.

During much of this book, as under orders from Mystra, Elminster restricts his use of magic, and he must again learn to survive by his wits and the skills he picked up earlier in his life. He later undergoes further magical training under the tutelage of a wicked sorceress who seeks to tempt him away from Mystra's path.
