= Elminster – The Making of a Mage =

1994 book by Ed Greenwood

- Cover of the first edition
- Author: Ed Greenwood
- Language: English
- Genre: Fantasy novel
- Published: 1994
- Publication place: United States
- Media type: Print (Paperback)
- Followed by: Elminster in Myth Drannor

Elminster – The Making of a Mage (1994) is the first book in the Elminster series by Ed Greenwood.

== Plot summary ==
Elminster – The Making of a Mage covers from his first encounter with magic as a young boy, to his days as a rebel fighter, to his nights as a thief, and then on to his life following Mystra. It is the first real insight into why Elminster is "Elminster". It starts with an overview of his tragic childhood, on to his even rougher life growing up trying to hide who he is. Then as a thief he sneaks into a closed temple of Mystra to defile it. He is about to set to his task when he is spotted by a mage but then saved by the Lady of mysteries and given a chance to slay the mage that was to slay him. After he debated with the Goddess over whether or not it is right to use magic he let the mage go. Mystra then helps to hide him from those who might want him to be used in their plots, or just kill him, until he has the power to take his revenge.

== Publication history ==
Ed Greenwood wrote Elminster: The Making of a Mage in only 16 days, and in 1994 the book sold out its 75,000 hardcover novel print run between Boxing Day and New Year's Eve.

== Reception ==
Elminster: The Making of a Mage was reviewed in White Wolf Inphobia #54 (April, 1995), rating it a 2 out of 5 and stated that "If the standard TSR price is assigned, this book is worth picking up, but the story seems shallow, especially given the possibilities of Elminster as a character and the Forgotten Realms as a setting."

Elminster: The Making Of A Mage appeared on the 2024 Game Rant "31 Best Dungeons & Dragons Novels, Ranked" list at #12.

== Reviews ==
- Backstab #4
