= Ian Hanmore =

Scottish actor

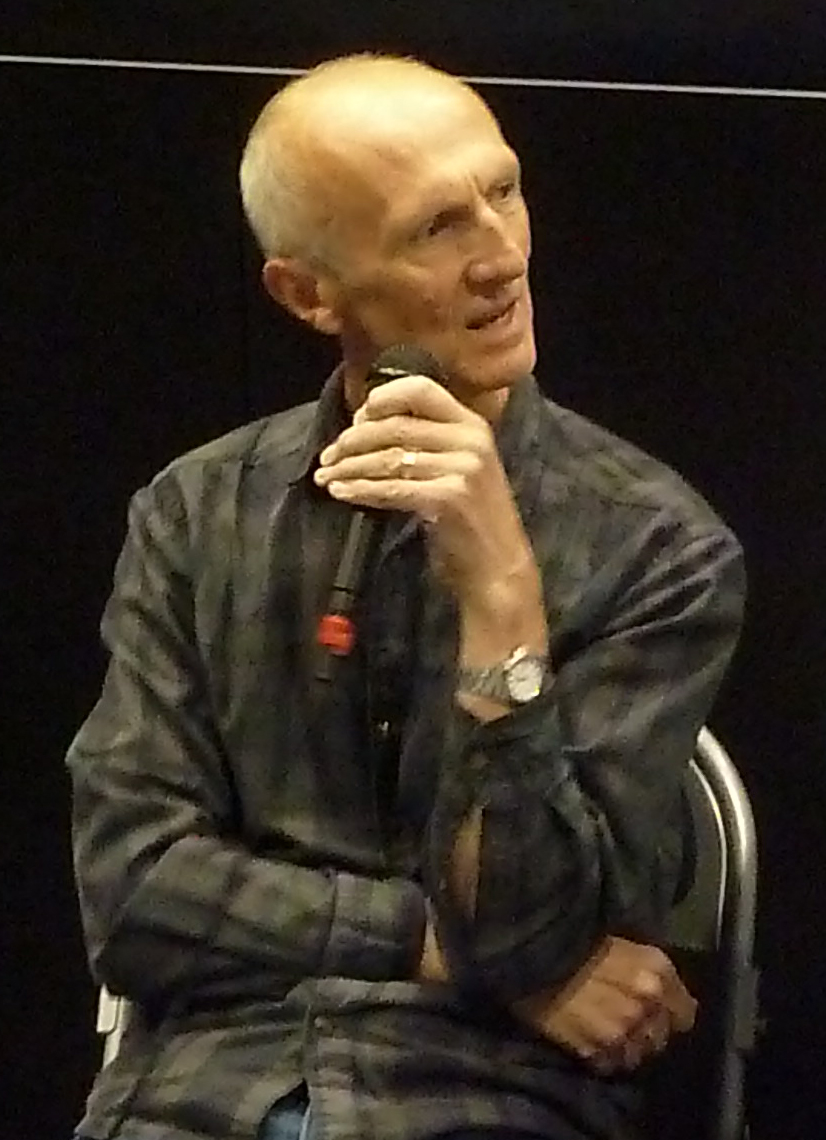
- Hanmore in 2014
- Occupation: Actor
- Years active: 1996–present

Ian Hanmore is a Scottish actor known for his role as the warlock Pyat Pree in the second season of the HBO series Game of Thrones.

== Career ==
He also played Albert Flood in The Awakening, Margaret's father in The Magdalene Sisters, Lord Ruthven in Mary Queen of Scots and Father Angelo in the 2006 Doctor Who episode "Tooth and Claw".

He played the Guide in James Graham's site specific piece "The Tour Guide" and has performed in a number of other stage productions including Chris Lee's "The Fall of the Peacock Throne" where he played Mohammad Mosaddeq. His most recent role was that of Joe Necchi in Untitled Production's adaptation of Alexander Trocchi's "Cain's Book".

He has voiced the Audiobook versions of a number of crime novels including work by James Oswald and Stuart MacBride.

== Filmography ==
=== Film ===
Year	Title	Role	Notes
1996	The Butterfly Man	Tom Reid	Short film
1998	Postmortem	Theodore Symes	
1999	Frog	The Reverend	Short film
1999	Women Talking Dirty	Rescuing driver	
2000	Kill the Day	Senior Guard	Short film Credited as Iain Hanmore
2002	Tattoo	Big John	Short film
2002	The Magdalene Sisters	Margaret's Father	
2003	Young Adam	Freight Supervisor	
2003	Solid Air	John Hutchison	
2003	The Ticking Man	Hitman	
2003	Divine	Dad	Short film
2005	Suburban Home	Lewis	Short film
2005	Retribution	Dennis Mckenzie	
2005	Mrs Henderson Presents	Poker Player	Uncredited
2005	The Best Man	Drunk	
2011	The Awakening	Albert Flood	
2012	Citadel	Council Office Clerk	
2013	Mary Queen of Scots	Lord Ruthven	
2015	Moxie	Ally	
2016	Simon, First and Only	Father Kavanagh	
2019	Dark Sense	Father Kavanagh	
2020	Home	The man	Short film
2023	Dungeons and Dragons: Honour Among Thieves	Szass Tam	
2025	Mickey 17	Darius Blank	
2025	In the Lost Lands	The Stranger	
2025	Tornado	Thief	

=== Television ===
Year	Title	Role	Notes
1999	Split Second	Billy's Father	TV movie
2001	Two Thousand Acres of Sky	Paul Macdonald	Episodes #1.1 & #1.3
2001	Gas Attack	Senior Police Detective	TV movie
2001	Terri McIntyre	Driving Instructor	Episode: "Classy Bitch"
2001	Monarch of the Glen	Markey	Episode #3.6
2002	The Book Group	Taxi Driver 1	Episodes: "The Alchemist" "Bedtime Stories"
2003	The Deal	Scottish MP 2	TV movie
2004	Outlaws	Judge Roberts	3 episodes
2005	No Angels	Pissed Up Pete	Episode #2.6
2006	Doctor Who	Father Angelo	Episode: "Tooth and Claw"
2006	Vital Signs	Derek Johnson	Episode #1.2
2007	Life on Mars	Peter Wilkes	Episode #2.7
2007	Still Game	Butler	Episode: "Fly Society"
2007	Dear Green Place	Oberon	Episode: "There's Been a Murder"
2009	Shameless	Robert	Episode #6.10
2011	Waking the Dead	Ernst Geiger	Episodes: "Harbinger: Part 1" "Harbinger: Part 2"
2011	The Fades	Polus	
2012	Game of Thrones	Pyat Pree	4 episodes
2014	The Game	Denis Lamb	Episode #6
2015	Outlander	Father Anselm	Episode: "To Ransom a Man's Soul"
2015	The Syndicate	John Kempt	3 episodes
2016	In Plain Sight	Robert Macdonald	Episode #1.2
2017	Armchair Detectives	Angus Brown	Episode: "Finders Keepers"
2019	Carnival Row	Master Thorne	2 episodes
