= Szass Tam =

- Forgotten Realms character

In-universe information
- Race: Lich
- Gender: Male
- Alignment: Neutral Evil
- Home: Thay

Szass Tam is a fictional character in the Forgotten Realms campaign setting for the Dungeons & Dragons (D&D) fantasy role-playing game.

== Description ==
Szass is a lich, an undead necromancer. He is the leader and most powerful of the Red Wizards of Thay, a group consisting of eight wizards with the title of zulkir who are the rulers of the country Thay. Many of the creatures that serve Szass Tam are undead.

Szass rules Thaymount, although there are rumors that Larloch commands him, searching for artifacts. He attempts to destroy the world and create his own in the year of the Dark Circle (1478 DR), but this plot is foiled.

== Appearances ==
Szass Tam in his attempt to rule over Thay and Toril is featured in the Forgotten Realms: The Haunted Lands novel trilogy by Richard Lee Byers (2007–2009) Szass makes an appearance in R.A. Salvatore's 2010 book Gauntlgrym. Other works include:

- Whitney-Robinson, Voronica. The Crimson Gold (Wizards of the Coast, 2003).
- Donovan, Dale. Villains' Lorebook (TSR, 1998).
- Pryor, Anthony. Spellbound (TSR, 1995).
- Rabe, Jean. Red Magic (TSR, 1991).
- Steve Perrin. Dreams of the Red Wizards (TSR, 1988).

== Other media ==
"Tam has been a prominent antagonist in various Dungeons & Dragons adventures and novels, although his profile is not quite as prominent as the liches Vecna and Acererak".

Szass Tam is a villain in the 2023 film Dungeons & Dragons: Honor Among Thieves, appearing in two scenes in the film, and portrayed by Scottish actor Ian Hanmore.
