= Bard (Dungeons & Dragons) =

Character class in RPG Dungeons and Dragons

- Dungeons & Dragons character class

Editions
- Standard class: 2nd; 3rd; v3.5; 5th; 5.5e
- Alternate class: Original; 4th
- Prestige class: 1st
- First appearance: Schwegman, Doug. "Mighty Magic Miscellany: Barding Harps" in The Strategic Review - Volume 2, Number 1
- Source books: The Strategic Review; Player's Handbook (1978, 1989, 2000, 2003, 2014); Player's Handbook 2 (2008)

Inspiration
- Based on: Bard

Grouping
- 1E base class: none
- 2E group: Rogue
- 4E powersource: Arcane
- 4E role: Leader

The bard is a standard playable character class in many editions of the Dungeons & Dragons fantasy role-playing game. The bard class is versatile, capable of combat and of magic (divine magic in earlier editions, arcane magic in later editions). Bards use their artistic talents to induce magical effects. The class is loosely based on the special magic that music holds in stories such as the Pied Piper of Hamelin, and in earlier versions was much more akin to being a Celtic Fili or a Norse Skald, although these elements have largely been removed in later editions. Listed inspirations for bards include Taliesin, Homer, Will Scarlet, and Alan-a-Dale.

== Publication history ==
=== Creative origins ===
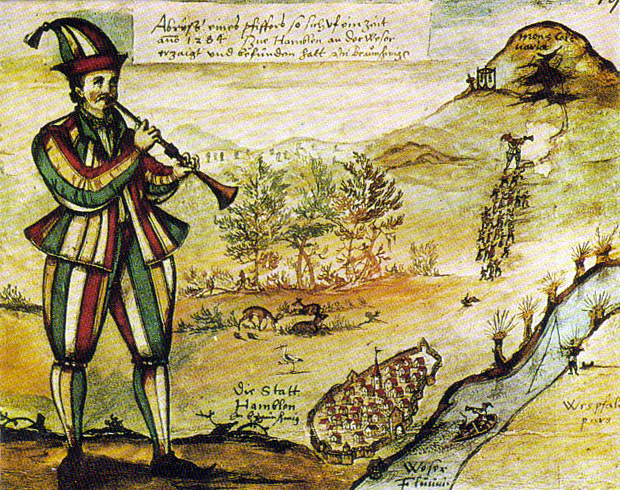
A bard is usually a musician

The class name itself "is originally of Celtic origin, descended from the Old Celtic 'bardo' which in turn produced the Scottish and Irish Gaelic 'bard.' This reference means 'poet-singer,' which introduced the word into English as a 'strolling minstrel'. [...] It is possible that the Celtic 'bardo' was formed from the Proto-Indo-European word 'gwredho' which means 'he who praises.' The Dungeons & Dragons bard is a hodgepodge of at least three different kinds of musical singers: the Norse skald, the Celtic bard, and the southern European minstrel". Historically, the title of 'bard' was initially considered "a term of great respect among the Welsh, but one of contempt among the Scots (who considered them itinerant troublemakers)" until later in history, when the term then became "idealized by Scott in the more ancient sense of 'lyric poet, singer.'" Throughout history, the bard has existed in a multitude of different forms, and "bardic traditions span many variations of personal approach, public conception, and historical context."

=== Dungeons & Dragons ===
A bard is traditionally defined as "a poet, especially one who writes impassioned, lyrical, or epic verse." In the fantasy tabletop role-playing game, Dungeons & Dragons, bards are a playable class centered on the idea of accessing magic through some form of artistic expression. The bard first appeared in The Strategic Review Volume 2, Number 1.

=== Advanced Dungeons & Dragons 1st edition ===
Bards in First Edition AD&D were a special class unavailable for initial character creation. A character could become a bard only after meeting specific and difficult requirements, achieving levels in multiple character classes, becoming a bard only later. The process of becoming a bard in the First Edition was very similar to what would later be standardized in D&D as the prestige class—the First Edition bard eventually became the Fochlucan Lyrist prestige class in the Third Edition supplement Complete Adventurer.

To become a bard, a human or half-elf had to begin with very high ability scores: Strength 15+, Wisdom 15+, Dexterity 15+ and Charisma 15+, Intelligence 12+ and Constitution 10+. These daunting requirements made bards one of the rarest character classes. Bards began the game as fighters, and after achieving 5th level (but before reaching 8th level), they had to change their class to that of thief, and after reaching 5th level as a thief (but before reaching 9th level), they had to change again, leaving off thieving and begin clerical studies as druids; but at this time they are actually bards and under druidical tutelage.

Bards gained a limited number of druid spells, and could be any alignment that was neutral on at least one axis. Because of the nature of dual-classing in AD&D, bards had the combined abilities of both fighters and thieves, in addition to their newly acquired lore, druidic spells, all level-dependent druidic abilities, additional languages known, a special ability to know legendary information about magic items they may encounter, and a percentage chance to automatically charm any creature that hears the bard's magical music. Because bards must have first acquired levels as fighter and thief, they are more powerful at first level than any other class.

This version of the bard is a druidic loremaster, more than a wandering minstrel and entertainer, though the bard does have song and poetic powers as well.

=== Advanced Dungeons & Dragons 2nd edition ===
The bard, as part of the "rogue" group, was one of the standard character classes available in the second edition Player's Handbook; in this edition, the bard was regularized. According to the second edition Player's Handbook, the bard class is a more generalized character than the more precise historical term, which applied only to certain groups of Celtic poets who sang the history of their tribes in long, recitative poems. The book cites historical and legendary examples of bards such as Alan-a-Dale, Will Scarlet, Amergin, and even Homer, noting that every culture has its storyteller or poet, whether such as person is called bard, skald, fili, jongleur, or another name.

In AD&D 2nd edition, bards were of the rogue group. They also became a more integral part of the game, being moved from an appendix in the back of the Players Handbook to the normal listing of classes. This iteration of the bard class was based on the version that appeared in the Dragon magazine article "Singing a new tune: A Different Bard, Not Quite So Hard" (issue #56).

A bard required ability scores of Dexterity 12+, Intelligence 13+ and Charisma 15+, and only humans and half-elves could be bards. Bard was the only character class (other than thief) in which any non-human could advance to unlimited level, as both humans and half elves did not suffer a level limit, unlike every other character class for which a demihuman was eligible.

The 2nd edition bard was explicitly a jack-of-all-trade class, with a limited selection of thief skills (pick pockets, detect noise, climb walls, and read languages) a limited wizard spell progression, access to proficiency in any weapon, and some special bardic music abilities and bardic lore. Beginning at 2nd level, a bard began to gain spells as if a wizard, and like wizards, they had to keep a spellbook and could not cast spells while in armor. They could learn any spell they had access to (as a mage would).

Bards' biggest advantage was their use of the rogue advancement table, which was the fastest in the game. Bards cast spells using their actual class level as their caster level. Since bards were usually higher level than the party's wizard, the spells they could cast were often more powerful than the wizard's. A bard who focused on spells that improved with caster level (such as Magic Missile and Fireball) was a very potent magical threat. Their ability to use any weapon, combined with rogue attack strength, made them credible second-line offensive threats even without magic, provided they had some form of magical Armor Class-boosting equipment.

In this edition, bards had the same alignment restrictions of First Edition, meaning they could not be Lawful Good, Lawful Evil, Chaotic Good or Chaotic Evil.

The Complete Bard's Handbook significantly expanded on the 2nd edition bard, allowing bards of any race, reasoning that most races would have an analogous role for keeping oral and/or artistic traditions. The sourcebook also allowed a wide variety of multi-classing options, even Bard/Thief combinations. Bards of races that allowed no wizards, including the core races dwarf and halfling, could not cast spells, but gained immunity to spells instead. Gnomes, who could be wizards, but only specialist illusionists, could be bards, but were restricted to the spell schools allowed an illusionist.

=== Dungeons & Dragons 3rd edition ===
In Dungeons & Dragons 3rd edition, the bard class continued its change from a druidic loremaster in first edition into a jack-of-all-trades (retaining mainly the original Bardic Knowledge ability, an almost universal chance to know anything based on character level and Intelligence). Bards now could be any non-lawful alignment, meaning Bards could no longer be Lawful Neutral, but now could be Chaotic Good and Chaotic Evil. This was explained on the grounds that a bard wanders freely and is guided by intuition and whim.

The D&D bard is inspired by wandering minstrels who were indeed considered "rogues" of a sort (for instance, attempting to earn free food and rooms at inns through doing odd jobs like killing rats, singing, or just wooing the bartender). D&D bards are described as not necessarily opposed to tradition, but to the staleness and risk of corruption that comes with a settled life.

Bardic magic also changed once again. Now, like the sorcerer, the bard casts arcane magic but without a need for spellbooks or preparing specific spells; unlike AD&D 2nd edition, bards are now limited to a list of specific bardic spells. Unlike wizards and other arcane spellcasters, they can cast a small number of healing spells like Cure Light Wounds (a relic of the druidic origins of the class).

Other abilities, like bardic music and the aforementioned bardic lore, were retained but overhauled to be more compatible with the streamlined d20 System rules of the Third Edition. Old abilities like Read Language became new d20 skills like Decipher Script, and the mix of fighter and thief abilities was retained in the mix of weapon and armor abilities.

==== Revised 3.5 edition (2003) ====
In 2003, the Revised "3.5" edition of Dungeons & Dragons was released, including several minor but significant changes to the Bard class. Bards gained increased access to skills and the ability to cast bard spells while in light armor. The bard is the only Core class able to freely cast arcane spells in armor, as well as the only Core class with Speak Language as a class skill (supplementary 3.5 books later introduced new base classes with these abilities).

Perhaps more significantly, one of the bard's trademark abilities—that of bardic music—was both strengthened and tied more closely to the bard class. In the previous 3rd edition, the bardic music abilities available to a character depended only on the amount of Perform skill that character possessed, not advancement in the bard class. These abilities largely did not improve, once acquired, and no new abilities became available at high levels; only the number of daily uses of the music increased with bard class level. In the 3.5 version, not only was the availability of bardic music abilities tied to bard class level as well as Perform skill, but also most of these abilities now significantly improved in potency with progression in the bard class. New high-level bardic music effects were introduced as well as progressive improvements of existing ones.

Finally, in this edition, bard became the favored class for the gnome race, replacing the traditional illusionist. The dvati (an obscure race, composed entirely of sets of twins, that first appeared in Dragon magazine #271), also have bard as their favored class, and the satyr also shares this class as a favorite. The Star Elf race from the Forgotten Realms setting's Unapproachable East sourcebook also has bard as its favorite class.

=== Dungeons & Dragons 4th edition ===
The bard class was introduced into 4th Edition with the release of Player's Handbook 2. Like all 4th Edition classes the bard's powers are exclusive to the class. Bards have the Arcane power source, the primary role of Leader and the secondary role of Controller, with most of its powers related to invigorating allies and hindering enemies through magical song (although the player is encouraged to describe these powers in whatever way they please).

The bard retains its role as a jack-of-all-trades with its large number of class skills. The bard is also unique in that they are free to take as many multiclass feats from other classes as they please, whereas all other classes are only able to take multiclass feats from one other class.

Members of the bard class can use wands, songblades, and magical instruments as their arcane implements. Several new rituals in Player's Handbook 2 can only be cast by bards, making them the only current class with exclusive rituals.

=== Dungeons & Dragons 5th edition ===
Bards have been included as a character class in the 5th Edition Player's Handbook. The 5th edition iteration of the bard emphasizes that "words and music are not just vibrations of air, but vocalizations with power all their own. The bard is a master of song, speech, and the magic they contain."

A bard's spellcasting abilities are determined by their charisma score, which means they can generally take on the role of the party face quite easily. However, due to their versatility, bards can potentially fill any party role depending on the subclass (or College) a player chooses to take. From the Player's Handbook, bards join either the College of Lore, which focuses on knowledge and performance, or the College of Valor, which focuses on inspiring bravery on the battlefield. Inspiring party members is an iconic feature of every bard regardless of subclass, as the Bardic Inspiration ability allows a player to add an additional die to any of their teammates attack rolls, ability checks, or saving throws. Additionally, the Jack of All Trades feature adds small bonuses to any abilities the character is not proficient in, while the Expertise feature adds large bonuses to any abilities the character is proficient in.

Bards have their own spell list and full casting progression up to 9th level spells, but are also able to access a limited number of spells from any of the other classes, due to the Magical Secrets feature, and gain bonuses to all skill checks. Xanathar's Guide to Everything (2017) added 3 more Bard College options: the College of Glamour, College of Swords and College of Whispers. The College of Glamour focuses on charming other creatures by magical means, the College of Swords focuses on damage output and attacking, and the College of Whispers focuses on use of sinister manipulation.

Mythic Odysseys of Theros (2020) added the College of Eloquence subclass, which was then reprinted in Tasha's Cauldron of Everything (2020) along with the new College of Creation subclass.

==== Revised 5th edition (2024) ====
The backward compatible Player's Handbook (2024), as part of the 2024 revision to the 5th Edition ruleset, updates preexisting player options while introducing new content to the game. Three bard subclasses (College of Glamour, College of Lore, College of Valor) are revised and one new subclass (College of Dance) is introduced. Chris Stomberg of TheGamer commented that "the biggest changes we see to bard subclasses revolve around the idea that bards are more than the classic musician archetype". Christian Hoffer of ComicBook.com and Shayna Josi of GameRant highlighted "one of the biggest functional changes" to base bard class is "how Bardic Inspiration works". Hoffer explained that it received "small but pertinent buffs". Critics also highlighted the improvements to the Countercharm and Magical Secrets class features.

== Reception ==
Screen Rant rated the bard class as the 9th most powerful class of the base 12 character classes in the 5th edition.

Based on a community poll, D&D Beyond ranked the bard class as the 6th most powerful class of the base 12 character classes in the 5th edition.

The Gamer rated the 5th edition bard subclass College of Glamour as the 9th most awesome subclass out of the 32 new character options in Xanathar's Guide to Everything.

Gus Wezerek, for FiveThirtyEight, reported that of the 5th edition "class and race combinations per 100,000 characters that players created on D&D Beyond from" August 15 to September 15, 2017, bards were the third to last in player creations at 7,804 total. Half-elf (1,808) was the most common racial combination followed by human (1,454) and then tiefling (806).
