= Mystra (Forgotten Realms) =

Dungeons & Dragon fictional deity

- Forgotten Realms character
- First appearance: "Down-to-earth Divinity" – Dragon #54 (October 1981)
- Created by: Ed Greenwood

In-universe information
- Race: Deity
- Gender: Female
- Title: The Lady of Mysteries the Mother of All Magic
- Alignment: Neutral Good
- Home: 2E: Dweomerheart (Elysium); 3E: Dweomerheart
- Power level: Greater
- Portfolio: Magic, spells, the Weave
- Superior: Lord Ao

Mystra (/ˈmɪstrə/ MIS-trə) is a fictional goddess in the Forgotten Realms campaign setting for the Dungeons & Dragons fantasy role-playing game.

She is the Mistress of Magic and Mother of Mysteries who guides the Weave of magic that envelops the world. She tends to the Weave constantly, making possible all the miracles and mysteries wrought by magic and users of magic. She is believed to be the embodiment of the Weave and of magic herself, her veins the ley lines, her breath the mists and her body the pulsing, thrumming earth.

She is a Neutral Good (previously, and still also, Lawful Neutral) Greater Power. Since the ascension of Midnight, her symbol is a ring of eight stars surrounding a red mist, which flows from the center to the bottom of the ring; however, her older and still commonly seen symbol is a simple seven-pointed star. Her divine realm is Dweomerheart, and her Third Edition D&D domains are Good, Illusion, Knowledge, Magic, Rune, and Spell.

== Publication history ==
=== Creative origins ===
Ed Greenwood created Mystra for his home Dungeons & Dragons game, set in Greenwood's Forgotten Realms world.

=== Advanced Dungeons & Dragons 1st edition ===
Mystra first appeared within Dungeons & Dragons as one of the deities featured in Ed Greenwood's article "Down-to-earth Divinity" in Dragon #54 (October 1981). Mystra is introduced as the Lady of Mysteries, the goddess of magic, a lawful neutral greater goddess from the plane of Nirvana. The article notes that Mystra is a manifestation of the Cosmic Balance, "the natural workings of the multiverse ... a "Great Mystery" ... or a known higher force", and states that as such she "appears to right great inequalities or goings-awry in the magical balance of things. She appears as a source of light (like a prismatic will-o'-the-wisp to ethereal and astral view, some say) which uses all spells at maximum level ... Mystra is constantly Shape Changing as far as an observer on any Prime Material plane is concerned. She is said to have given the first teachings that unlocked the forces termed “magic” to the races of the Prime Material plane (and, some say, has forever after regretted the deed). Mystra was made lawful neutral on the premise that magic is inherently neutral, and exhibits internal order and laws. Many mages believe that Mystra determines success in the creation of new spells, potions, and magic items." Mystra's role in the cosmology of the Forgotten Realms is detailed: "Azuth serves Mystra. Mystra and Selûne have a mysterious connection ... and Mystra often works with Oghma and his gods." Mystra is most commonly worshipped by magic-users of any alignment, and characters working as sages.

Mystra later officially appeared as one of the major deities for the Forgotten Realms campaign setting, in the Forgotten Realms Campaign Set's "Cyclopedia of the Realms" booklet (1987).

=== Advanced Dungeons & Dragons 2nd edition ===
Mystra was described in the hardback Forgotten Realms Adventures (1990), the revised Forgotten Realms Campaign Setting (1993) in the "Running the Realms" booklet, and Faiths & Avatars (1996). Her clergy was further detailed in Warriors and Priests of the Realms (1996), and Prayers from the Faithful (1997).

Her role in the cosmology of the Planescape campaign setting was described in On Hallowed Ground (1996).

Her relationships with the nonhuman deities in the Forgotten Realms was covered in Demihuman Deities (1998).

Mystra is described as one of the good deities that celestials can serve in the supplement Warriors of Heaven (1999).

=== Dungeons & Dragons 3rd and 3.5 edition ===
Mystra appears as one of the major deities of the Forgotten Realms setting again, in Forgotten Realms Campaign Setting (2001), and is further detailed in Faiths and Pantheons (2002).

Mystra's history was included in the sourcebook The Grand History of the Realms (2007).

=== Dungeons & Dragons 4th edition ===
According to the Forgotten Realms Campaign Guide (2008), Mystra has been murdered by Cyric, and is no longer part of the Pantheon. Her death initiated the Spellplague, which is the direct cause of most of the changes Toril has undergone between editions.

=== Dungeons & Dragons 5th edition ===
The in-game mechanic to transition the Forgotten Realms from 4th Edition to 5th Edition was called the Second Sundering; this undid the effects of the Spellplague which restored much of the world to its pre-Spellplague state. Mystra is listed as the goddess of magic for the Forgotten Realms setting in the Player's Handbook (2014).

The Sword Coast Adventurer's Guide (2015), a campaign setting guide, includes information on the worship of Mystra and on her connection with both magic and the Weave.

== Fictional history ==
=== First Incarnation ===
Originally called Mystryl, the goddess of magic was a Chaotic Neutral greater power of Limbo within the domain Dweomertor, born during the battle between Shar and Selûne in the dawn of time. Being the goddess of magic, spells, creativity, invention, and knowledge, she was said to have taught the first spellcaster of the Realms. All spells of all types were known to her when their creators constructed them, and her spirit was said to imbue all inventors, authors, songwriters, and artists. She was most venerated by wizards and those who used magic or magical items. She provided and tended the Weave, the conduit that enabled mortals to safely access the raw magic force.

Mystryl was depicted as a beautiful human female with rainbow-colored hair, radiant skin, and burning blue eyes. She wore simple, but elegant, blue-white robes of the finest heavy silk. At other times she was depicted as a vaguely female humanoid form composed entirely of prismatic-hued will-o’-wisps.

According to Ao, Mystryl had ultimate control over all magic and could shape it to her will, and she could withdraw a being's access to the Weave and prevent it from using spells of any sort, and in an even harsher restriction she could also prevent a being from using any sort of magic whatsoever if she so decreed. These conditions persisted until she removed them.

Mystryl could even deny deities access to the Weave, but she couldn't deny other gods the ability to grant their worshipers spells through prayer.

True to her chaotic nature, Mystryl was flirtatious and profound, flighty and persistent, light-hearted and deadly serious. Her moods and state-of-mind varied from moment to moment, but she generally tried to do what she thought was right. She seemed too trusting and innocent at times, and tended to overreact when she felt she had been tricked. She distrusted but didn't hate Shar, who had sought to seize control over her for centuries, and she also rebelled occasionally against the good-intentioned suggestions of Selûne, who she regarded as smotheringly maternal at times. Kozah and Moander, who always seemed intent on ruining that which she created or inspired, were her mortal enemies. Mystryl died when Karsus, wanting to take her place as god of Magic created the most powerful spell ever (12th level spell) and nearly destroyed the Weave. Mystryl sacrificed herself to save the Weave before it was too late.

=== Second Incarnation ===
Mystra came into being after Mystryl sacrificed herself to save Faerûn from the destruction of Netheril caused by Karsus in DR -339. Mystryl sacrificed herself to save the Weave before the damage became irreparable.^{:47} When reincarnated as Mystra, she used the form of a peasant girl learning the basics of cantra magic but with the capacities for archwizardry. She recreated the "Weave" of magic with a few more rules, and no spell above 9th level would function.

Priests and priestesses of the new goddess of magic were told the story of Karsus in dreams and visions when they prayed for spells. It was Mystra's attempt to make sure that nothing like this ever happened again. Yet Karsus was accredited as being the only human to have ever achieved godhood through spellcasting, even if it was only for a fleeting moment.

==== Mystra's Chosen ====
Mystra installed the mortal Azuth as the first magister, a position created specifically to recognize her most promising mortal pupil. With the help of Mystra, who had become his lover, Azuth finally ascended to divine status, and also enslaved Savras and Velsharoon. Mystra told Azuth at about the time of the Year of the Rising Flame (0 DR) that some of her divine power must be given into mortals, which would slumber within them, so that Mystra could call on it only with their permission. It would serve to help them heal quickly and would stretch their years into virtual immortality, but otherwise it would avail them little. The Chosen might gain some special powers, but these would still be far less than those of a deity.

The Goddess of All Magic accordingly appeared to a few mortals she considered suitable, first in dream visions and then directly, and ultimately invested part of her divine power (known as the Silver Fire) in them. Elminster (who was trained by Mystra personally in the form of one of her own priestess named Myrjala), and Khelben Blackstaff, were two of the first.

==== Daughters of Mystra ====
It soon became clear to Mystra that most mortals were not tough enough to carry divine power. They either soon withered and died, burnt out by the load they carried, like the elfqueen Aloevan of Ardeepor, or they thrived but were twisted and corrupted by their power, like the mage Sammaster, who began to think of himself as a god and set about building himself a cult of worshippers (which survives today as the Cult of the Dragon). Thus Mystra proceeded to breed her own children, known as the Seven Sisters through the possessing of the Half-Elf Elué Shundar and mating with Dornal Silverhand. Elué/Mystra and Dornal were wed in the Year of Drifting Stars (760 DR).

The happy couple had a daughter, Anastra Syluné, the following winter (the Year of Laughter, 761 DR), and six other daughters followed one per winter: Endue Alustriel in the Year of the Snow Sword (762 DR); Ambara Dove in the Year of the Sharp Edge (763 DR); Ethena Astorma (later known as Storm Silverhand) in the Year of Mistmaidens (764 DR); Anamanué Laeral in the Year of the Cowl (765 DR); Alassra Shentrantra, who is known today only as the Simbul in the Year of the Yearning (766 DR), and Qilué Erésseae in the Year of the Awakening Wyrm (767 DR).

(However, it was written in p. 7 that Sammaster's year of birth was on or near 800 DR, which was after the seven, and in p. 8 He then became the first mage to become one of the Chosen of Mystra since the Seven Sisters many years before. These could mean that her failed relationship/mentorship with Sammaster had nothing to do with her decision to breed the Seven.)

=== Third Incarnation ===
At the end of the Time of Troubles, Midnight was bestowed Mystra's godhood and portfolio by Ao. Midnight adopted Mystra's name in order to make peace with her worshippers, and named her mortal friend Adon, a former cleric of Sune, as her head of church. At this time Mystra's stated alignment shifted from Lawful Neutral, maintaining the balance in use of magic, to Neutral Good, reflecting the mortal's attitudes towards the uses and purpose of magic. Midnight/Mystra retained her home among the clockwork planes of Mechanus. She remained aided in her work by Azuth and Elminster.

In the Avatar Series, Mystra was revealed to be a uniquely powerful being. In Shadows of the Avatar, she is described as more powerful than any god (save Ao). The major catch is that roughly half of Mystra's power lies in her Chosen and in the Lesser Power Azuth; Ao arranged things this way so that Mystra would not rule all Realmspace.

While Mystra might be the most powerful god, that doesn't save her from Cyric and Shar, in the year 1385, when the two group together to kill her in her own realm of Dweomerheart, destroying it utterly, and ruining several smaller realms and lesser deities, as said in the final entry in The Grand History of the Realms.

=== Death ===
Murdered by Cyric in the Year of Blue Flame (1385 DR), Mystra is no longer a part of the Forgotten Realms pantheon. The Weave that she controlled and oversaw from her plane, Dweomerheart, burst - as did its counterpart the Shadow Weave. This resulted in the Spellplague spreading across the cosmos.

=== Fourth Incarnation ===
Mystra returned to the Forgotten Realms in 1479 DR. A vestige of Mystra had survived her death in 1385 DR, and was guiding her Chosen to aid in her renewal. The Simbul was tasked to close multiple rifts in the Weave and between realms. In doing this task, she absorbed much Silverfire and Blue Flame. The Simbul gifted all of that energy to Elminster, who in turn freely returned it to Mystra in a cave within the King's Forest of Cormyr. This new Mystra was a combination of the memories of Mystra and Midnight/Mystra, and presumably of Mystryl as she had drawn her memories from the Weave rather than from personal experience.

Mystra's return was highlighted as part of the Dungeons & Dragons Encounters adventure War of Everlasting Darkness by Wizards of the Coast in 2012. She assisted the adventurers in defeating Lolth and her efforts to plunge Faerun into everlasting darkness, which would have allowed the drow to invade and conquer the surface realms.

== Fictional relationships ==
Mystra's greatest enemies are Shar, who created the Shadow Weave in response to Selûne's creation of Mystryl and the birth of the Weave, and Cyric, who was a mortal along with Mystra and Kelemvor (with whom Mystra had a cold friendship). She was served directly by the Lesser Power Azuth (who was killed during the Spellplague), and indirectly by demipowers Savras and Velsharoon. Mystra also had powerful mortal servants in her Chosen including Elminster, Khelben Arunsun and the Seven Sisters.

=== Orders ===
- Order of the Starry Quill

The Starry Quill is an order of Mystran bards who often work as information gatherers and rumormongers for the church or spend part of their time in designated libraries unearthing magical knowledge and then preserving it for posterity.

- Order of the Shooting Star

The Church of Mystra sponsors an order of rangers, known as the Order of the Shooting Star. These rangers receive their spells from Mystra. They serve as long-range scouts and spies for the church and also deal with magical threats that threaten the natural order of things, such as unloosed tanar'ri and baatezu and creatures born of irresponsible wizardly experimentation.

- Knights of Mystic Fire

The Church of Mystra sponsors a knightly order of paladins, the Knights of the Mystic Fire, who are granted their spells by Mystra. They often accompany members of the clergy on quests to locate lost hoards of ancient magic and also form the cadre from which the leadership for the small groups of armed forces who guard Mystra's larger temples and workshops is drawn.

=== Weave ===
In the Forgotten Realms campaign setting, the Weave is the source of both arcane and divine spellcasting. Within the context of the Forgotten Realms, raw magic is characterized as difficult for mortals to access safely. The Weave works to protect the world from the dangers of unrefined magic while giving the ability to cast spells to magic users. Destroying the Weave results in widespread destruction. Reckless use of magic can also damage the Weave, creating areas of dead or wild magic where normal spellcasting doesn't work. In ancient Netheril, "Spellcasters are arcanists and do not memorise spells – they merely pluck them out of the weave." As described in earlier editions, when spellcasters would abuse magic, Mystra could cut off the spellcaster's ability to use magic. In addition to the Weave, there is also a Shadow Weave created by the goddess Shar; because Shar is a goddess of secrets, its secrets are kept mostly to herself.

The Weave is present in everything and is inextricably bound to the deity in charge of maintaining it; killing this deity also destroys the Weave. The Sword Coast Adventurer's Guide (2015) states, "in two senses, both the metaphorical and the real, the goddess Mystra is the Weave. She is its keeper and tender, but all three times the goddess of magic has died or been separated from her divinity [...], magic has been twisted or has failed entirely". In the history of Faerûn, the Weave has been destroyed multiple times. The first time this occurred was when an archwizard attempted to rob the goddess Mystryl of her power. When he could not handle the power, the Weave became destabilized and Mystryl chose to sacrifice herself, which briefly stopped magic until Mystryl was reincarnated as Mystra.^{:47}

The Weave was then part of Mystra's body, who actively willed its effects, until the events leading up to the Spellplague. When Mystra was assassinated in 1385 DR (about a century before the time of the Forgotten Realms 4th Edition campaign setting), the Weave collapsed and initiated the Spellplague, leading to several long-standing effects during 4th Edition:

- Realms that had been separated from Toril, the world of Faerûn, returned after millions of years of separation, including landforms from Abeir (a sister world to Toril) fusing with Toril, and the Feywild coming closer in proximity.
- A large part of Faerûn fell into the Underdark, draining the Sea of Fallen Stars and forming the Underchasm.
- Creatures touched by the Spellplague were hideously mutated into powerful monsters or spellscarred beings with special abilities.
- Some deities were slain.
- Most magical portals were rendered inert or malfunctioning.
- Items that permanently store magic and divine magic remained unchanged.
- The goddess Shar lost control of the Shadow Weave.

The Second Sundering (the transition from 4th Edition to 5th Edition) separated Abeir and Toril. This undid the effects of the Spellplague which restored magic and the Weave to its pre-Spellplague state. Curtis D. Carbonell, in the book Dread Trident: Tabletop Role-Playing Games and the Modern Fantastic, highlighted the Sundering event as a lore explanation for game mechanic changes. He wrote: "A new sundering was needed to return FR to its pre-Spellplague state. Such complexities are often beyond the interest of many players, but those who choose to unravel them face a historiography and an archive-building challenge of great magnitude. The latest articulation of FR, though, provides a workable solution because it has adjusted itself through the editions, enough so that even 4e can be situated into the multiverse".

== Reception ==
Mystra was #12 on The Gamer's 2020 "Dungeons And Dragons: 15 Most Powerful Gods, Ranked" list — the article states that "Mystra is more lawful than her predecessor, and in her reordering of magical law, she outlawed the use of all spells above 9th level, introduced limited access to magic (spell slots), and made spellcasting harder to perform in every way".

Curtis D. Carbonell, in the book Dread Trident: Tabletop Role-Playing Games and the Modern Fantastic, highlighted that major events in the Forgotten Realms occur around Mystra's various deaths such as the fall of Netheril "because archmage Karsus attempts to become a god and kills Mystryl" who is then reincarnated into the first iteration of Mystra. Roughly 1400 years later, the Era of Upheaval ends due to the actions of "Shar, the dark goddess who covets Mystra's control of magic (the Weave), [who] sets Cyric on a path to kill the ascended Midnight, who had taken the previous Mystra's portfolio. Midnight/Mystra's death in 1385 leads to the disastrous Spellplague, a 4e mechanism to justify its rule-set and setting's changes".

In the Io9 series revisiting older Dungeons & Dragons novels, Rob Bricken described Midnight in Shadowdale as "a mage who wakes up one day with a mysterious silver pendant grafted to her skin" and notes that " When a young waif named Caitlin begs for help rescuing her mistress, Kelemvor, Cyric, and Adon accept, but Kelemvor refuses to allow a woman on the team until Caitlin sees Midnight’s pendant and insists the sorceress come along. It's a good thing because Midnight saves their collective asses multiple times throughout the course of the novel." He notes that in the second half of the novel " Kelemvor and Midnight fall for each other (of course) and he becomes less of an asshole, especially after his curse is revealed". Bricken points out that "Despite magic being a total mess, Midnight solves so many conflicts with it she repeatedly becomes a deus ex machina" and that "While Midnight is practically the only female character in the book other than Mystra, she's never a damsel in distress; she's utterly competent, an excellent fighter in her own right, and drives almost the entirety of the plot."

Mystra's relationship with Elminster has also been highlighted. Aubrey Sherman, in the book Wizards: The Myths, Legends, and Lore, featured the relationship between Mystra and Elminster as an example of wizards who receive power and training via a god. Sherman wrote, "his magical abilities, which are considerable, are the result of being one of the Chosen of Mystra, which gives him a direct connection to her and to the magic 'weave,' [...]. However, when Mystra is assassinated, the result is a collapse of the Weave, an event known as the Spellplague. [...] Because of this, Elminster largely withdraws from the world". Ari David, for CBR, emphasized the multiple trials Mystra puts Elminster through before picking him as her Chosen. David wrote, "He was taught many lessons, including Mystra turning him into a woman in order to gain a greater understanding of the world and a stronger connection to the Weave. He spent years serving as a priestess of Mystra, calling herself Elmara". Later Elminster would successfully free his home from the ruling magelords, and "though he was the rightful heir to the throne of Athalantar, he abdicated and placed a friend in his stead, having no taste for ruling. Myrjala revealed herself to have been Mystra in disguise all along, there to test him. Impressed by Elminster, she asked him to be one of her Chosen". Academic Aidan-Paul Canavan highlights that the Chosen of Mystra, such as Elminster, act as an in-game mechanism to protect the status quo of the Forgotten Realms. Canavan wrote, "the Chosen of Mystra act as enforcers that protect the polder, inhibit progress and entrench the boundaries of the fantastic realm. Alternatively the Chosen of Mystra could be considered avatars of the game creators and designers, who themselves actively protect the Forgotten Realms from progress and normally evolving time in order to keep the setting static and stable, with the appearance of tumultuous change and chaos".
