= Faerûn =

Fictional continent in Forgotten Realms

Faerûn (/feɪˈruːn/ fay-ROON) is a fictional continent and the primary setting of the Dungeons & Dragons world of Forgotten Realms. It is described in detail in several editions of the Forgotten Realms Campaign Setting (first published in 1987 by TSR, Inc.) with the most recent being the 5th edition from Wizards of the Coast, and various locales and aspects are described in more depth in separate campaign setting books. Around a hundred novels, several computer and video games and a film use Faerûn as the setting.

== Fictional culture and technology ==
Economically and technologically, Faerûn is comparable to Western Europe during the late Middle Ages, giving most new players using this campaign setting an intuitive grasp of the way the society functions. Gunpowder, known here as the magical substance smoke powder and different in its composition from historical gunpowder, is starting to make an appearance, but much of the armament is still dominated by pre-gunpowder weaponry such as swords, spears, and bows. Most of the population of Faerûn consists of farmers, who are organized somewhat loosely in a semi-feudal system. There are also several notable cities and trade between nations is common, as in the Renaissance era. Likewise, there are regions where additional less developed tribes and customs persist. Home to many different cultures, "[i]t is an eclectic land, rich in history, that has witnessed the rise and fall of kingdoms, forever bearing the scars of centuries of war."

A major difference between the setting and Earth is the presence of magic. The system of magic is subdivided into divine and arcane categories, with the former empowered by a Faerûnian deity, and the latter by rituals or innate abilities which manipulate a mystical field called the Weave, the source of magical energies on Toril. Faerûn has a pantheon of deities that are worshipped by the followers of this region. These are comparable to mythological deities of the ancient Greek pantheon and cover a range of ethical beliefs and portfolios of interests.

Faerûn is home to many non-human creatures of varying degrees of civilization or barbarism. Among these are several different races of dwarves, gnomes, halflings and elves, as well as goblins, orcs, lizardfolk, ogres, various giants, and even dragons.

There are several organized alliances in Faerûn, with each pursuing their particular agenda. A few are dedicated to decent and honest causes, such as the Harpers, who protect the good-natured races and seek a balance between civilization and nature. The Harpers are opposed by evil organizations, including the Red Wizards of Thay and the nihilistic Cult of the Dragon. In the northern lands, the Zhentarim is an evil network seeking to dominate the region. Their efforts are being resisted by the Lords' Alliance, a council of knights that pursues the interests of the northern cities. Other organizations of Faerûn include the magical Seven Sisters, a band of assassins called the Fire Knives, a group of ruthless thieves operating out the city of Waterdeep named Xanathar's Guild, and the mysterious Shades—the returning survivors of the long-fallen Netheril empire.

=== Religion ===
Faerûn is home to a large and diverse pantheon of deities, including:

- Greater deities: Lord Ao, Akadi, Asmodeus, Bane, Chauntea, Grumbar, Istishia, Kelemvor, Kossuth, Lathander, Lolth, Mystra, Oghma, Shar, Silvanus, Sune, Talos, Tempus, Torm, Tyr, Ubtao
- Intermediate deities: Auril, Bahamut, Beshaba, Gond, Helm, Ilmater, Loviatar, Mask, Mielikki, Tiamat, Tymora, Umberlee, Waukeen
- Lesser deities: Azuth, Deneir, Eldath, Lliira, Lurue, Malar, Milil, Shaundakul, Talona
- Demideities: Drasek Riven, Finder Wyvernspur, Fzoul Chembryl, Garagos, Gargauth, Gwaeron Windstrom, Hoar, Jergal, Nobanion, The Red Knight, Savras, Sharess, Shiallia, Siamorphe, Ulutiu, Uthgar, Valkur, Velsharoon
- Quasi-deities: Tchazzar
- Dwarven deities: Abbathor, Berronar Truesilver, Clanggedin Silverbeard, Deep Duerra, Dugmaren Brightmantle, Dumathoin, Gorm Gulthyn, Haela Brightaxe, Laduguer, Marthammor Duin, Moradin, Sharindlar, Thard Harr, Vergadain
- Dead deities: Amaunator, Auppenser, Bhaal, Earthmother, Eshowdow, Ibrandul, Jazirian, Kalzareinad, Karsus, Kiputytto, Kukul, Leira, Moander, Murdane, Myrkul, Mystryl, Othea, Ra

=== Organizations ===
Numerous organizations of different types operate throughout Faerûn, including the Companions of the Hall, Cowled Wizards, Cult of the Dragon, Drow houses (like Baenre and Do'Urden), Elk Tribe, Flaming Fist, The Four (Mirt the Moneylender, Durnan, Asper, and Randal Morn), Harpers, Iron Throne, The Kraken, Moonstars, Red Wizards of Thay, Seven Sisters, Shadow Thieves, and Zhentarim.

Vartha Do'Urden was the previous matron mother of House Do'Urden whose unexpected death allowed her daughter Malice to take control of the house.

== Fictional geography ==
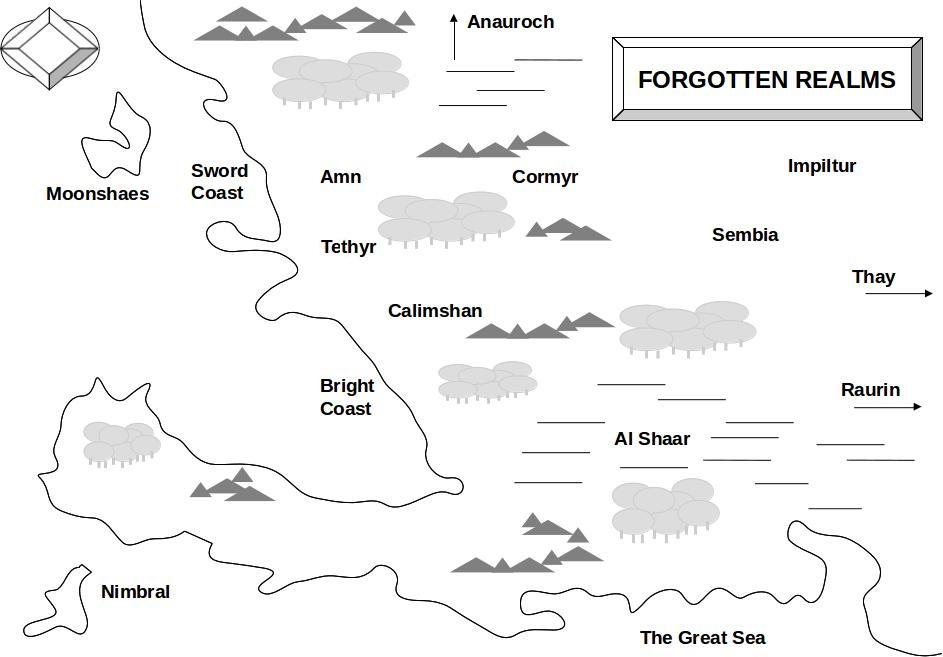
Faerûn partial map

The sub-continent of Faerûn is set in the northern hemisphere of the planet Toril (previously Abeir-Toril.) The continent has a "landmass of approximately nine and a half million square miles". Faerûn is the western part of an unnamed supercontinent that is quite similar to real-world Afro-Eurasia. Within the setting, "sub-arctic extremes chill its northern reaches, where ice sheets like the Great Glacier dominate the landscape in blinding white. To the south are the equatorial jungles of Chult and the tropical coasts of Halruaa. It's bordered on the west by the Trackless Sea and on the east by the Endless Wastes and the Hordelands that separate it from Kara-Tur". Kara-Tur, which was the original setting of the D&D Oriental Adventures campaign setting, and Zakhara, home to the Arabian Nights setting Al-Qadim, are also on this continent. Maztica, home of a tribal, Aztec-like civilization is far to the west, across an Atlantic-like ocean called the Trackless Sea. The subterranean regions underneath Faerûn are called the Underdark.

Faerûn includes terrain that is as varied as that of Europe, western Asia, and much of Africa is on our planet Earth. Role-playing campaigns in Faerûn can be set in a wide variety of locations, each with its own hazards and potential rewards for the participants. Likewise, the region that the players explore can determine what types of monsters they will face, which famous individuals they will encounter, and what types of missions they assume.

Besides the exterior coastline to the west and south, the most dominant feature on the continent is the Sea of Fallen Stars. This is an irregular inland sea that keeps the neighboring lands fertile and serves as a major trade route for the bordering nations. Next in significance is the Shaar, a broad region of grasslands in the south that, together with a large body of water called the Lake of Steam, separates the area around the inland sea from the coastal nations at the southern edge of the continent. To the east, Faerûn is bordered by a vast region of steppe that separates it from Kara-Tur. In the north are massive glaciers, named Pelvuria and Reghed, and a region of tundra. South of the continent, separated by the Great Sea, is a sub-tropical land called Zakhara.

The largest cities in Faerûnas of 3rd edition
City	Region	Population (thousands)
Waterdeep	Sword Coast	348
Skuld	Mulhorand	205
Calimport	Calimshan	193
Gheldaneth	Mulhorand	172
Unthalass	Unther	165
Suldolphor	Calimshan	144
Bezantur	Thay	137
Eltabbar	Thay	123
Athkatla	Amn	118
Zazesspur	Tethyr	116
Cimbar	Chessenta	111

=== Northern regions ===
To the northwest, Faerûn is a region of wilderness, difficult winter weather, hordes of orcs, and barbarous human tribes. This region is generally referred to as "The North". It is a mostly-untamed region that lies between the large Anauroch desert in the east and the expansive Sea of Swords to the west with a mountain range at the far north called the Spine of the World. This area contains huge wooded regions such as the High Forest and the Lurkwood, the frozen Icewind Dale to the north, and an untamed region called the Savage Frontier, which includes the Silver Marches (Luruar). The coastal region is called the Sword Coast, "a haven for adventurers". Here are found the "iconic locations" of the city-state of Neverwinter and the large port city of Waterdeep. Undermountain is a vast dungeon crawl under the area of Waterdeep, rated among the "deadliest" and most iconic in the game. The Ten Towns are located within Icewind Dale with the Sea of Moving Ice at the northernmost place in known Faerûn. In the module Icewind Dale: Rime of the Frostmaiden, the titular Frostmaiden Auril makes her home on an island in this sea.

Deep inland are the ancient dwarven citadels of Mithral Hall, Citadel Felbarr and the largest of the three, Citadel Adbar, which was featured in the Legacy of the Drow series of novels. This area is one of the most popular regions for role-playing campaigns set in Faerûn, and has been the setting for a number of popular role-playing video games. Another city is Mirabar, the mining center for the Sword Coast.

North of the Sea of Fallen Stars is a region that stretches from the wide Anauroch desert in the west to the eastern edge of the inland Moonsea, in the northern region of the continent. It is a region of contrasts, with the forested Dalelands, the desert wastes of Anauroch, the coastline of the Moonsea with the infamous Zhentil Keep, and the bitterly cold steppes of The Ride. Along the east coast of the Dragon Reach (a northern branch of the Sea of Fallen Stars) is a temperate region called The Vast, consisting of farmlands, forests and the Earthsea mountains. This area includes the city of Ravens Bluff, which for many years was home to the RPGA's Living City role-playing campaign and the site of the Living City series of game modules. The Dragonspine Mountains, which house the infamous Citadel of the Raven on their western slopes, is a mountain range northwest of the Moonsea.

Northeastern Faerûn is a remote area that begins in the cold, forbidding lands along the great ice sheets and continues south toward the northeastern shores of the Sea of Fallen Stars. It is bordered on the west by the mountain-hemmed land of Vaasa and stretches east to the vast steppes of the Hordelands, with its largest city of Winterkeep. This region also contains the lightly populated kingdom of Damara, the druidic forests of the Great Dale, the coastal kingdom of Impiltur, the fallen and once evil empire of Narfell, and the trading nation of Thesk. Mystical Rashemen is a land ruled from behind the scenes by spiritual witches, and it is the location of the Neverwinter Nights 2: Mask of the Betrayer computer game. The lands of Damara and Vaasa were described in a 1989 publication, FR9, The Bloodstone Lands. This area formed the setting for the "H Series" of modules that used the Battlesystem rules to resolve battles. Together with remains of Nafell and the nation of Sossal they form a region named the Cold Lands.

Secomber is a small town of nearly 1,500 that acts as a de facto border town between the relatively peaceful Western Heartlands and the more savage North along the Sword Coast. The village of Daggerford lies along the Shining River along the Sword Coast. The sunken city of Northkeep was the first city built around the Moonsea by humans.

Miyeritar and Ilythiir were ancient elven empires.

The most populous nations in Faerûn
Nation	Population (millions)
Calimshan	5.34
Mulhorand	5.34
Thay	4.92
Unther	4.26
Tethyr	3.77
Chessenta	3.39
Amn	2.96
Sembia	2.46
Chondath	1.98
Turmish	1.69
Halruaa	1.68
Cormyr	1.36
Damara	1.32
Great Rift	1.31
Aglarond	1.27
Impiltur	1.21

=== Middle lands ===
The western part of Faerûn includes the nations south of Waterdeep and north of the Shining Sea, that border along the Sea of Swords. The west includes the city of Baldur's Gate (named for the great seafaring hero Balduran) the library-fortress of Candlekeep, both considered among "D&D's most iconic locations", the nations of Amn, Tethyr, Calimshan, the region of Western Heartlands, and the elven stronghold of Evereska. These regions were the setting for the Baldur's Gate series of computer games. To the west, in the vast ocean called the Trackless Sea, is a multitude of islands collectively named the Nelanther Isles. Other island kingdoms include the gnomish realm of Lantan, the country of Nimbral and, further north and west, the Moonshae Isles and Ruathym.

The Bloodstone Lands module from TSR.

With the exception of the Shining Plains, the interior lands of Faerûn lie along the irregular coastline of the western Sea of Fallen Stars. In the north, the Dragonmere arm of the sea extends far to the west, ending close to the Western Heartlands. To the south, the Vilhon Reach forms a second arm leading to the southwest. The notable areas within this region include Chondath, Cormyr, the Dragon Coast, Hlondeth, the Pirate Isles and Prespur, Sembia (and its largest city of Selgaunt), Sespech, Turmish, and the Shining Plains.

Along the eastern expanses of the Sea of Fallen Stars, the water forms a long arm that travels to the east before turning south to become the Alamber Sea. The northern nations of this mysterious area are termed the "Unapproachable East" and the southern nations the "Old Empires" in campaign setting publications. This region includes the nations of Aglarond, Ashanath, Altumbel, Mulhorand, Murghôm, Thay, and Unther. Chondalwood is a long, forested region to the south of Chondath and Chessenta. Thay is a magocracy ruled by the Red Wizards which was described in the 1988 publication FR6: Dreams of the Red Wizards. The nation has made multiple attempts to invade neighboring countries and following a civil war, the lich Szass Tam became Thay's leader. Shannon Appelcline, author of Designers & Dragons, highlighted that "Thay doesn't have an obvious real-world derivation like some of the Realms. The wizards rebelled from the Egyptian-based Mulhorand, while their occupied land is somewhat reminiscent of India. However the best parallel to Thay may actually be Stygia, an evil land from Robert E. Howard's Conan stories".

Tharsult is an island of unscrupulous traders in the Shining Sea.

=== Southern nations ===
To the southwest lies along the great Chultan peninsula that juts out toward the west. The waters to the north are named the Shining Sea, a body bounded by Calimsham to the north and joined to the Lake of Steam through the Straits of Storm. To the south of the land is the Great Sea. Located in this area are Chult, Lapaliiya, Samarach, Tashalar, and Thindol.

South of the Sea of Fallen Stars is a region somewhat isolated by the Lake of Steam in the west, and the vast length of the Shaar. It is bordered along the south by the Great Sea; to the west by the Chultan peninsula region, and in the east by Luiren. The south includes the Border Kingdoms, Dambrath, the Great Rift, Halruaa, the Lake of Steam, and The Shaar.

South and east of the grassy plains is an area known as the Shaar, along the shores of the Great Sea opposite the land of Zakhara. The region includes the lands of Durpar, Estagund and Var the Golden (collectively called the Shining Lands), Luiren, the land of Halflings, Ulgarth, the easternmost extent of Faerûn, and Veldorn, the land of monsters, as well as The Great Rift, a large, powerful nation of dwarves, within a titanic canyon

=== Underdark ===
The immense complex of caverns and passages that lie beneath many parts of the continent of Faerûn is known as the Underdark. It contains cities of the elf-related drow including the infamous Menzoberranzan and the ruins of Ched Nasad, as well as Maerdrimydra, Llurth Dreir and Sshamath; cities of duergar such as Gracklstugh and Dunnspeirrin; and cities of creatures called the kuo-toa, illithids, and beholders.

== Changes in geography ==
=== Third Edition ===
When the third edition of the Forgotten Realms Campaign Setting was released in 2001, the designers took the opportunity to redesign the continent of Faerûn. Its size was reduced slightly to remove 'empty space' from the map and the Chultan Peninsula was moved several hundred miles north, reducing the size of the empty grassplain known as the Shaar. Additionally, the designers slightly adjusted the projection of the map to better reflect the curvature of the planet. There was no in-universe explanation given for these changes as it was classified as a retcon.

=== Fourth Edition ===
The fourth edition of the Forgotten Realms Campaign Setting, released in 2008, saw major changes to the geography of Faerûn and the world of Abeir-Toril. Due to a magical cataclysm known as the Spellplague, the southern parts of Faerûn were devastated. Chult became an island detached from the mainland, the kingdom of Halruaa was utterly destroyed, and parts of the Sea of Fallen Stars drained into the Underdark. The northern Realms were less affected by the Spellplague, but during the 100-year gap between the third and fourth editions of the setting, it was revealed that the Netherese wizards of the city of Shade had eliminated the desert of Anauroch, returning the land to its pre-Fall state. The borders of some of the kingdoms were changed to reflect this. In addition to these changes, floating islands of earth known as 'earthmotes' appeared in the skies above Faerûn and the continent of Maztica across the western ocean vanished along with the Faerûnian colonies on its east coast.

== In other media ==
- In 2013, a mod for the video game Civilization V by Sid Meier was set in Faerûn. Reviewer Christopher Livingston praised the adaptation as "a really neat mod. The modder, framedarchitecture, clearly knows his Forgotten Realms lore and history". 25 civilizations based on Faerûn's creatures and nations, individual characters, locations, and Dungeons & Dragons' schools of magic were integrated, providing high recognition value.
- The Baldur's Gate video game series take place in Faerûn.
- The 2023 film Dungeons & Dragons: Honor Among Thieves is set in Faerûn.
- The Adventure Zone: Balance, including its graphic novel series, are set in Faerûn.
- Dungeons & Dragons: The Twenty-Sided Tavern (2024), a stage production which combines actual play, improv, and immersive theater, is set in Faerûn.
- Dungeons & Dragons: Secrets of Waterdeep, a 2025 theme park attraction at Universal Studios Hollywood, is set in Waterdeep.
