= Kara-Tur: The Eastern Realms =

Tabletop role-playing game supplement

- The cover to the Kara-Tur: The Eastern Realms boxed set
- Genre: Role-playing game
- Publisher: TSR, Inc.
- Publication date: 1988
- Media type: Boxed set

Kara-Tur: The Eastern Realms is an accessory and campaign setting for the Advanced Dungeons & Dragons fantasy role-playing game.

== Contents ==
Kara-Tur: The Eastern Realms is a supplemental sourcebook which expands on the Forgotten Realms campaign setting, Kara-Tur, which was first introduced in Oriental Adventures. Like other campaign supplements, Kara-Tur serves as an optional opportunity for Dungeons and Dragons players to interact with a "world of Eastern mystery" not previously described in other books.

Several of the regions and lore of Kara-Tur are inspired by the locations and history of East and Southeast Asia:

- Shou Lung: The oldest, populous, and most prominent state of Kara-Tur, with a bureaucratic, provincial system. Ruled by a central Emperor, Chancellor, and seven ministries. Inspired by the dynastic system and merit-based examination of Imperial China.
- T'u Lung: Founded after a period of civil war within Shou Lung. Similarly to Shou Lung, utilized a provincial system with local governors, though lacked the merit-based system of governance. Inspired by Imperial China during eras of political disunity, e.g. the Three Kingdoms period.
- Wa: A feudal military state that occupied one half of the island chains in Eastern Kara-Tur, prior to its devastation during the Spellplague. Ruled by a single shogun, several of his daimyo, and samurai serving under them. The Path of Enlightenment, a belief system shared with Kozakura, seems to be heavily inspired by both Confucian and Buddhist ideals. Inspired by Feudal Japan (Heian and Mid Edo)
- Kozakura: A military-dominated, warring state, with daimyo factions vying for political power. Also follows The Path of Enlightenment, alongside the Eight Million Gods belief system. Inspired by Feudal Japan, particularly the Sengoku period of political instability. (Feudal/Sengoku period).
- Northern Wastes: A diverse, unexplored stretch of land geographically North of Kara-Tur. Home to both native tribes and immigrating tribes from the Plain of Horses. Shamanism and Animism inspire the primary belief systems. Inspired by historical Eastern Siberia
- Tabot: A cold, mountainous region in central Kara-Tur, founded jointly by native tribes and Path of Enlightenment monks fleeing Shou Lung. Primarily nomadic and reliant on trading. Inspired by Tibet (Tibetan Empire)
- Koryo: A North-Eastern empire consisting of three associated kingdoms. Tense relations with the neighboring Kozakura, with frequent invasions and wars. Often described as a prideful, defensive civilization. Inspired by Korea's three kingdoms period.
- The Island Kingdoms: An archipelago in South-East Kara-Tur. Inspired by Pre-colonial civilizations of Indonesia and the Philippines, though lacking detail.
- The Plain of Horses: Inspired by Historical Mongolia. This region is the Kara-Tur portion of the Hordelands, also known as the Endless Wastes. Consists of nomadic tribes, a strict tribe system, and an emphasis on the breeding and taming of Steppe Horses.
- The Jungle Lands of Malatra: A jungle located in South Kara-Tur, home to three distinct nations: Purang, Laothan, and Kuong. Loosely inspired by pre-colonial civilizations of Indochina (historical versions of the Khmer Empire and Vietnam) as well as the hill tribes inspired by their Southeast Asian counterparts.

== Publication history ==
The fantasy setting known as Kara-Tur was described in the original 1985 Oriental Adventures book. A reviewer for White Dwarf called the long background section of Kara-Tur in the book, a "bonus". Kara-Tur is described in the "Province Book" from the 1986 Swords of the Daimyo module. The 1987 Forgotten Realms Campaign Set left the eastern half of its continent reserved for the future publication of Kara-Tur. According to Jim Bambra, "While primarily drawing on Japan for inspiration, [Kara-Tur] also contains elements of medieval China and Korea."

Kara-Tur: The Eastern Realms was written by Mike Pondsmith, Jay Batista, Rick Swan, John Nephew and Deborah Christian, and features a cover by Jeff Easley and interior illustrations by Jim Holloway. It was published by TSR in 1988 as a boxed set with two 96-page books, four large color maps, and two plastic overlays.

Shannon Appelcline noted that John Nephew had been contributing to Dragon and Dungeon, and that "As he continued to write for the magazines, he was also invited to contribute to larger projects such as Kara-Tur: The Eastern Realms (1988) and WG7: Castle Greyhawk (1988)." Appelcline also highlighted that "Kara-Tur was the first big [sic] expansion" of the Forgotten Realms that "used real-world cultures as a touchstone".

== Reception ==
Kara-Tur: The Eastern Realms is a Gamers' Choice award-winner.

Appelcline highlighted a note from Ed Greenwood, creator of the Forgotten Realms, that the major additions to the setting with real-world correlations "also include 'recastings of my largely-offstage kingdoms like Unther and Mulhorand to more closely resemble real-world historical (or 'Hollywood historical') settings.' Greenwood disagrees with the results, saying that 'the too-close-to-our-real-world additions like Maztica, the Hordelands, and Kara-Tur were a mistake in style'. He thought that they '[pulled] gamers out of roleplaying into disputes about historical details, for one thing'."

The holder of rights to Dungeons and Dragons, Wizards of the Coast, considers Kara-Tur: The Eastern Realms among such "legacy content" that "may reflect ethnic, racial, and gender prejudice that were commonplace in American society at that time", and distances itself from such prejudices.

=== Reviews ===
Kara-Tur: The Eastern Realms was reviewed in issue 16 of the German RPG-magazine ZauberZeit.

== Related products ==
=== Sourcebooks ===
==== Advanced Dungeons & Dragons 2nd edition ====
In 1989, a printing of Trail Maps for Kara-Tur appeared. In 1990, the maps were again included in The Forgotten Realms Atlas. Later that year, TSR converted the monsters of Kara-Tur to second edition Advanced Dungeons & Dragons rules as part of the Monstrous Compendium series.

After 1990, TSR ceased publishing new material related to Kara-Tur. The setting was, however, occasionally referred to by other TSR products such as Spelljammer and Ravenloft.

==== Dungeons & Dragons 3rd edition ====
The setting of Kara-Tur still exists on Abeir-Toril and is often mentioned in Forgotten Realms supplements. Characters and artifacts from Kara-Tur sometimes show up in Faerûn, but beyond that there is little interaction between the continents.

==== Dungeons & Dragons 5th edition ====
The 2015 release of Sword Coast Adventurer's Guide, a supplement, introduced Kara-Tur to the fifth edition of Dungeons & Dragons. There is a brief description of the land along with references throughout the book to its culture and how certain classes or backgrounds might fit in there. In 2025, Wizards of the Coast's Japanese branch released the beginner's adventure module The Oni's Right Hand. While the adventure takes place in Phandalin, it features characters from Kara-Tur who are in search of an object. This module was only released in Japan.

=== Modules ===
The Kara-Tur campaign setting inspired the following eight adventure modules (in chronological order):

- OA1, Swords of the Daimyo (1986)
- OA2, Night of the Seven Swords (1986)
- OA3, Ochimo: The Spirit Warrior (1987)
- OA4, Blood of the Yakuza (1987)
- OA5, Mad Monkey vs. the Dragon Claw (1988, zip)
- FROA1, Ninja Wars (1990)
- OA6, Ronin Challenge (1990, zip)
- OA7, Test of the Samurai (1990)

=== Books ===
Three choose your own adventure style books (one was actually released before the original Oriental Adventures book) were published:

- Blade of the Young Samurai – Endless Quest 23 (1984)
- Test of the Ninja – AD&D Adventure Gamebook 5 (1985)
- Warlords – 1 on 1 Book 7 (1986)

One of novels in The Empires Trilogy is set in Shou Lung of Kara-Tur.

- Troy Denning (1990). Dragonwall. Forgotten Realms: The Empires Trilogy, Book 2. Wizards of the Coast. ISBN 0-88038-919-2.

=== Other ===
- Dragon #315, for information on ancestor feats and martial arts styles specific to the Kara-Tur setting, as well as updated information on the 10 empires and regions of Kara-Tur.
