= The Complete Book of Necromancers =

Supplemental sourcebook for Advanced Dungeons & Dragons role-playing game

- Author: Steve Kurtz
- Genre: Role-playing game
- Publisher: TSR
- Publication date: 1995

The Complete Book of Necromancers is a sourcebook for the second edition of the Advanced Dungeons & Dragons fantasy adventure role-playing game. As part of the DMGR series, the information in this book is intended for use by the Dungeon Master to develop villains and NPCs, and is not recommended for use by players.

== Contents ==
The Complete Book of Necromancers follows the format of the previous "Complete" books, covering character creation, kits, proficiencies, and devices. Unlike most "Complete" books, which are written for players as much as Dungeon Masters, the Complete Necromancer is intended for DMs. Character kits introduced include the Anatomist, Philosopher, and Deathslayer. The book presents history (the differences between Roman and Celtic witches, how Eastern societies viewed death) and sociology (the cultural stigma of necromancy, how wizards deal with discrimination). Humans can specialize in necromancy, as can drow, dragons, githyanki, even undead. The Allies chapter provides rules for apprentices, henchmen, and familiars. The death gods are described, and rounding out the book are a set of ready-to-play NPCs (one per character kit) and a fully developed campaign base called Sahu, Isle of the Necromancer Kings. The book also provides an analysis of the relationship between spells and alignments. It sorts spells into three color categories, each linked to a particular ethos: Black necromancy, encompassing spells that bring physical injury or spiritual annihilation, is associated with evil practitioners; gray necromancy, to which the majority of necromantic spells belong, are appropriate for neutral wizards; and good wizards are drawn to white necromancy, with spells that restore life and fortify living bodies. Finally, there are 15 pages of new spells.

The book focuses on developing and playing characters of the Necromancer type of specialist wizard, with some attention given to death priests. Kurtz discusses the moral implications of characters who study the necromantic arts, as well as the way in which societies regard such characters. The book provides new spells for both wizards and clerics (as well as new priest spheres), new kits, and equipment geared toward practitioners of necromancy, as well as new nonweapon proficiencies. Additionally, the book covers organizations and schools for necromancers, as well as discussing ways in which studying necromancy may lead to physical disfigurement of the character. Similarly to the PHBR series of player aid books, The Complete Book of Necromancers includes advice on running a campaign involving necromancers, and provides details on the types of hirelings and retainers such a spellcaster might employ.

Kurtz also provides examples of different types of necromancers, including Kazerabet, a villain character he initially created in the Al-Qadim supplement Cities of Bone, and details the island of Sahu, which was featured in his supplement Ruined Kingdoms.

== Publication history ==
The Complete Book of Necromancers was written by Steve Kurtz for TSR. Published in 1995, the editing was by Matt Forbeck, black and white art by Karl Waller, and color art by Brom, Jeff Easley, and John and Laura Lakey, and Robh Ruppel.

Shannon Appelcline, the author of Designers & Dragons, highlighted that it was the "seventh book in the Dungeon Master Guide Rules (DMGR) supplement series for AD&D 2e". He commented that the book includes rules for NPC necromancers instead of rules for player character necromancers. Appelcline wrote: "this restriction is due to the fact that necromancers are generally evil, which would offer grave 'moral' problems to players. [...] We can probably qualify these claims with the fact that TSR of the 90s was deathly afraid of the religious right and 'angry mothers' criticizing D&D for being satanic. It's actually quite remarkable that Lorraine Williams' TSR was willing to produce a book about necromancers at all; it's certainly no surprise that the TSR of this era also claimed that necromancers shouldn't be played by PCs".

== Reception ==
White Wolf #56 (June 1995) included the book on the "Top 20 Games List" for April 1995 based numbers of units sold with Hobby Games Distributors providing the retail numbers.

Rick Swan reviewed The Complete Book of Necromancers for Dragon magazine #222 (October 1995). He comments that "Kurtz's literate, no-nonsense style makes this one of the most readable entries in the series. He employs, however, a pair of premises that may not sit well with everyone, especially those who like their AD&D in-your-face and unconditional." He found the character kits "intriguing but tame", especially the Anatomist and Philosopher, and noted that even the Deathslayer, "a selfless enemy of dangerous undead, comes off as a pussycat". Swan found that "the serious tone gives necromancers an unexpected depth, certain to satisfy those who prefer Masterpiece Theater to Beavis and Butthead. But players used to the unapologetic assault of Werewolf and Call of Cthulhu may find it all a little too, uh, nice." He goes on to say, "If you buy the approach, however, you're in for a treat. Kurtz has packed the book with sharp insights and inspired mechanics." Swan found the death gods to be "masterful inventions; the Queen of the Noose rules as the patron of premeditated killing, and followers of the God of Pestilence foster disease by harvesting slime from corpses." Swan concludes in his evaluation: "If you're a DM who runs an ordered campaign, and you're in the market for necromancer NPCs, this is the book for you. But if you're a player interested in ruling a kingdom of zombies or sewing tentacles to your chest, keep looking. Reserved and brainy, The Complete Book of Necromancers is the role-playing equivalent of a college text, an erudite collection of provocative ideas. Just don't expect it give you the creeps."

In 2013, Alex Lucard, for Diehard GameFAN, commented: "I've often heard this book referred to as 'the single greatest supplement in Second Edition,' both by players and those of us who have worked in the design/writing/editing side of tabletop gaming. You know what? I largely agree with it. [...] EVERY DM, regardless of edition, should read this thing. Not just because it's a perfect guide on how to design, run and play a Necromancer antagonist, but because it's such an in-depth look at the school of magic and the mindset of those that would harness the powers of the negative plane for various uses, be they benevolent or malevolent".

== Reviews ==
- Australian Realms #23
