= Oriental Adventures =

1985 fantasy role-playing game

- 1st edition, cover art by Jeff Easley
- Authors: Gary Gygax; David "Zeb" Cook; François Marcela-Froideval
- Genre: Role-playing game
- Publisher: TSR
- Publication date: 1985
- Media type: Print (Hardback)
- ISBN: 0-88038-099-3
- OCLC: 13643577
- Dewey Decimal: 794 19
- LC Class: GV1469.62.D84 G95 1985

Oriental Adventures (abbreviated OA) is the title shared by two hardback rulebooks published for different versions of the Dungeons & Dragons (D&D) fantasy roleplaying game. Each version of Oriental Adventures provides rules for adapting its respective version of D&D for use in campaign settings based on the Far East, rather than the medieval European setting assumed by most D&D books. Both versions of Oriental Adventures include example campaign settings.

== Advanced Dungeons & Dragons ==
The original Oriental Adventures (ISBN 0-88038-099-3) was written by Gary Gygax, David "Zeb" Cook, and François Marcela-Froideval, and published in 1985 by TSR, Inc. as a 144-page hardcover for use with the Advanced Dungeons & Dragons (AD&D) 1st edition rules. The book was edited by Steve Winter, Mike Breault, Anne Gray, and Thad Russell. The book's cover art was by Jeff Easley, with interior illustrations by Roger Raupp, James Holloway, Easley, and Dave Sutherland.

In 1999, a paperback reprint of the first edition was released.

=== Campaign features ===
Oriental Adventures contains rules for ten character classes and three races to be used in place of standard AD&D classes and races. The book presents new versions of the barbarian (here a warrior of the steppes, or a dweller of the forest or jungle) and monk, as well as new classes such as the ninja, kensai, wu-jen, and shukenja.

Kensai are weapons masters who "seek to perfect their weapons technique to the exclusion of all else. They are deadly in combat, but cannot use magical weaponry because it detracts from the appreciation of their skill". Wu-jen are spellcasters who must strictly follow their personal taboos to avoid losing all of their spell powers. Shukenja are clerics who become punished if they kill enemies too often. A ninja character must take one of the other classes as well as the ninja class. In keeping with their secret nature, ninja use their normal class as a cover identity; a ninja must be careful to keep his identity secret, as loss of honor (and sudden death) may occur if the PC is unmasked. The other classes introduced in the book are the sohei, the bushi (peasant warriors), the samurai, and the yakuza. The three new character races are the korobokuru (roughly equivalent to dwarves, without their tempers and greediness), the hengeyokai (intelligent animal beings that are able to shape-change into human form), and the spirit folk (humanoids whose life force is linked to the well-being of a specific location). The book draws on the history of China, Korea, and Japan, and includes information on families, clans, caste, and honor.

The original Oriental Adventures introduced two major innovations to the AD&D system. Although previous TSR publications, such as Deities & Demigods, had touched on using non-European settings for the game, Oriental Adventures was the first official supplement devoted entirely to roleplaying in a non-Western setting. Oriental Adventures also introduced a new game mechanic to Dungeons & Dragons; it was the first official supplement to include rules for non-weapon proficiencies. Every character is expected to possess proficiencies in the noncombat arts with skills such as calligraphy, etiquette, animal handling, iaijutsu (fast draw), and bowyer. Both non-weapon proficiencies and non-European settings were explored in more detail in the 2nd edition AD&D rules.

The book includes an honor system, in which honor points are lost when a character behaves poorly or damages the family name; the player must eventually stop playing that character, if such behavior continues. The personal honor of a character affects the honor of the character's family. The character's family background is also determined by a system which generates a character's immediate family and ancestors, determines family honor and status, and also provides characters with their birthrights.

Also included are detailed rules for karate and other martial arts styles, which enable a Dungeon Master to create new styles of martial arts and techniques using a range of available options. All characters may study martial arts, provided they can find masters to teach them; monks and shukenja start their adventuring lives with some martial arts training. Each character class also has its own unique ki powers, which become more effective as characters advance through each level.

The original Oriental Adventures includes a lengthy section of background information for the fantasy setting known as Kara-Tur. Kara-Tur was later made a continent of Abeir-Toril. TSR went on to produce eight adventure modules using the Oriental Adventures rules and the Kara-Tur setting.

Gary Gygax intended to incorporate the material from Oriental Adventures into revised versions of the Players Handbook and Dungeon Masters Guide, but left TSR shortly after announcing the project. Oriental Adventures was TSR's biggest seller in 1985. Little, if any, material from Oriental Adventures was incorporated into the AD&D 2nd Edition core books, and Oriental Adventures itself was never revised for a 2nd Edition.

=== Reception ===
In Issue 74 of White Dwarf, Ashley Shepherd felt that this game was "a completely new version of AD&D", adding "The old stand-bys of the AD&D system are still in the rules, but the elements have been intelligently modified to produce something that is far greater than the sum of its parts." Shepherd liked the new character classes, noting that the monk was in its proper Eastern context, and that the ninja was the best version Shepherd had seen. Shepherd also liked the new skill system of proficiency slots, and felt these should be extended to all of AD&D, not just this setting. Shepherd felt that the honor system was a good touch, and that the real strength of the new martial arts system was that the gamemaster was now able to construct any number of new styles of combat. Shepherd compared Oriental Adventures to rival role-playing game Bushido, and felt that Oriental Adventures was a better choice as a game system. Shepherd concluded by giving the game an excellent rating of 9 out of 10, saying, "By remaining compatible with the rest of AD&D, [designer] Dave Cook has written an excellent set of rules which should be very popular. Oriental Adventures has even persuaded me to start playing AD&D again."

In the November 1986 edition of Asimov's Science Fiction, Matthew J. Costello noted that although based on AD&D, this product "aspires to more than supplemental status. It contains a tremendous amount of information about bushi, samurai and ninja, not to mention the cultural and social background of the Orient." Costello concluded "Oriental Adventures can really stand on its own, with specialized game rules."

In Issue 30 of the French games magazine Casus Belli , André Foussat warned "Playing AD&D in this new environment will require a major effort from the JDM (Japanese Dungeon Master) to integrate the entire rulebook (140 rather dense pages). There are a significant number of references from one section of the book to another and everything is very linked." However, Foussat admitted that the book excited him and he had his Japanese weapons ready for play.

In his 1990 book The Complete Guide to Role-Playing Games, game critic Rick Swan admitted that the game was heavily derivative of AD&D but noted that this publication has "a unique design approach that skillfully integrates game mechanics with background material. It's a vivid setting and a fascinating set of rules." Swan enjoyed the character generation process, commenting, "The resulting characters are richly textured, clearly motivated, and a lot of fun to play." However, Swan warned that "Oriental Adventures is not for beginners ... a familiarity with AD&D is presumed, and a general understanding of Oriental culture and traditions is helpful." Swan also noted that this product, published in 1985, was based on the first edition of AD&D whereas TSR had published the second edition of AD&D in 1989, "so the referee will have to make a few adjustments when switching between systems." Swan concluded by giving the game an excellent rating of 3.5 out of 4, saying, "For experienced players, Oriental Adventures is a delight. A sophisticated, challenging game, it's the best Eastern-flavored RPG ever published."

Scott Taylor of Black Gate listed the Oriental Adventures as #6 on the list of "Top 10 'Orange Spine' AD&D Hardcovers By Jeff Easley, saying "I'm guessing that if there is one book on this list a lot of folks don't own, it is this one, but that doesn’t mean this kind of epic 'in the clouds' duel between a samurai and a ninja isn't worth every penny!"

=== Other releases ===
TSR released several products with the Oriental Adventures logo. This includes a series of modules numbered OA1 to OA7, the first five of which (Swords of the Daimyo, Night of the Seven Swords, Ochimo: The Spirit Warrior, Blood of the Yakuza, and Mad Monkey vs. the Dragon Claw) were released for first edition AD&D. The sixth module (Ronin Challenge) was released for the second edition, as was the seventh module (Test of the Samurai) which did not have the Oriental Adventures logo. The last three of these modules also had the Forgotten Realms logo. The Kara-Tur: The Eastern Realms boxed set, also for Forgotten Realms, was billed as an expansion for Oriental Adventures. Also released for second edition was a volume for the Monstrous Compendium series.

== Dungeons & Dragons 3rd edition ==
Oriental Adventures
- Cover of 2nd edition using rules of D&D 3.0, art by Raven Mimura
- Author: James Wyatt
- Genre: Role-playing game
- Publisher: Wizards of the Coast
- Publication date: October 2001
- Media type: Print (Hardcover)
- Pages: 256
- ISBN: 0-7869-2015-7

In order to make Oriental Adventures compatible with the 3rd edition of D&D published in 2000, a second version of Oriental Adventures (ISBN 0-7869-2015-7) was written by James Wyatt and published by Wizards of the Coast in October 2001. The cover art is by Raven Mimura, with interior art by: Matt Cavotta, Larry Dixon, Cris Dornaus, David Martin, Raven Mimura, Wayne Reynolds, Darrell Riche, Richard Sardinha, Brian Snoddy, and Arnie Swekel.

When WotC published a revision of the 3rd edition D&D rules known as v3.5 in 2004, an official (but not 100% comprehensive) update of Oriental Adventures was published in Dragon #318 (April 2004), pp. 32–48.

=== Campaign features ===
The book includes: seven playable new races, including nezumi, vanara, and three different types of spirit folk; five new base classes, including the samurai, sohei, and shugenja; 17 new prestige classes; over one hundred new spells; and seventy-five new monsters, over a dozen of which (including five types of Naga) were given level adjustments for adapting them into playable races. The featured campaign setting of this edition is Rokugan, a campaign setting originally created for the game Legend of the Five Rings.

=== Reception ===
The reviewer from Pyramid noted that while the first edition book was a 144-page black and white text, the third edition book was 256 pages and full color.

=== Reviews ===
- Backstab #35
- Backstab #39
- Dragão Brasil

=== Awards ===
The second version of Oriental Adventures won the 2002 Ennie Award for "Best Campaign Setting".

== Dungeons & Dragons 4th edition ==
Wizards of the Coast did not release a new edition of Oriental Adventures for the 4th edition of D&D, but several Oriental Adventures items appeared in 4th edition rules:

- A number of the monsters such as the oni, were included in the 4th edition Monster Manual.
- The shaman was featured in the Player's Handbook 2 as a leader based on the primal power source.
- The monk appeared in Player's Handbook 3.
- Samurai and sohei were added as character themes in Dragon Issue 404 (October 2011).

== Controversy ==
In 2016, blogger Aaron Trammel accused TSR of cultural appropriation, noting, "Although Gary Gygax envisioned a campaign setting that brought a multicultural dimension to Dungeons & Dragons, the reality is that by lumping together Chinese, Japanese, Korean, Mongolian, Philippine, and 'Southeast Asian' lore he and co-authors David 'Zeb' Cook and Francois Marcela-Froideval actually developed a campaign setting that reinforced western culture's already racist understanding of the 'Orient.'" In 2020, RPG author Daniel Kwan called the content of Oriental Adventures "racist" and accused Wizards of the Coast (WotC) of continuing to profit from sales of the older TSR book through on-line sales of PDFs by licensed third parties. Two weeks later, WotC added a disclaimer to the top the product pages of several older products, including Oriental Adventures that read in part, "Some older content may reflect ethnic, racial, and gender prejudice that were commonplace in American society at that time. These depictions were wrong then and are wrong today."

In his 2023 book about the history of role-playing games, Monsters, Aliens, and Holes in the Ground, Stu Horvath noted the book seemed to be influenced "as much by lurid pulp stereotypes, Yellow Peril propaganda, and the lingering specter of European imperialism ... It's a kind of monolithic mush of fantasy 'Asianness' that verges on parody."
