= Al-Qadim =

Dungeons & Dragons fictional campaign setting

- Designers: Jeff Grubb
- Publishers: TSR, Inc.
- Publication: 1992
- Genres: Arabian Nights
- Systems: AD&D 2nd Edition

Al-Qadim is a campaign setting for the Dungeons & Dragons role-playing game which was developed by Jeff Grubb with Andria Hayday for TSR, Inc., and was first released in 1992. Al-Qadim uses One Thousand and One Nights as a theme and is set in the land of Zakhara, called the Land of Fate. Thematically, the land of Zakhara is a blend of the historical Muslim Caliphates, the stories of legend, and a wealth of Hollywood cinematic history. Zakhara is a peninsula on the continent of Faerûn in the world of Toril, the locale of the Forgotten Realms campaign setting, although Al-Qadim is designed to stand on its own or be added to any existing campaign setting. The basic campaign setting was divided between two game products: Al-Qadim: Arabian Adventures, a sourcebook describing character creation rules, equipment, and spells unique to the setting, and Al-Qadim: Land of Fate, a boxed set describing the land of Zakhara, with separate sourcebooks for the players and the Dungeon Master.

== Publication ==
The first Al-Qadim product, Arabian Adventures, was released in 1992. Arabian Adventures presents only the basic rules for playing a D&D game set in a general Arabian setting, much like the Oriental Adventures book. The specific details of the setting are dealt with in later publications.

The Al-Qadim setting was designed with a limited scope, and was intended as a two-year project that was extended one more year beyond that because of its popularity.

Shannon Appelcline commented on Al-Qadim's 1992 release as "an Arabic setting that ended up placed in the southern Forgotten Realms. Like the other games of this period it had a strong artistic design, here overseen by Andria Hayday. The 'cultural book' as Grubb called it – trying to suggest that it was an Oriental Adventures like release, rather than a full-blown campaign – was well received. Grubb would later say that was because they had managed to hide the setting's potential from 'the suits'".

== Important concepts ==
There are a number of important concepts to the Zakharan culture including honor, family, social station, purity, piety, and hospitality.

Zakharan society is broken into two main divisions:

- Al-Badia: The nomadic desert people.
- Al-Hadhar: The city people.

Zakhara's society is made up mainly of humans, but demihumans such as elves and dwarves are present in the setting as well, as well as humanoids such as orcs, goblinoids, and ogres. Unlike most settings, there is practically no racial disharmony in Zakhara: humans, elves, and orcs alike share the same culture, lifestyle, and social status, and races traditionally considered evil savages, such as goblins, are instead valued members of society. The nomadic Al-Badia are predominantly human, whereas the Al-Hadhar possess greater diversity. The nomads and city-dwellers, humans and non-humans alike are all united as a single culture under a single religion (a polytheistic pastiche of Islam) and as subjects of the caliph; the entire continent is effectively a single empire, although different regions, city-states, and tribes have unique local cultures.

Not all inhabitants of Zakhara belong to the shared culture, however: there are many tribes of pagan human barbarians who reject the Law of the Loregiver and the worship of the Pantheon, and certain monstrous races—including the yuan-ti, the vile yak-men (or yikaria as they call themselves), and most giants—dwell apart in their own societies.

The people of Zakhara speak and write a common language called Midani (represented by Arabic).

Zakhara has a wide variety of gods, but all recognize the power of Fate, who may cast down the mightiest sultan or raise up the meanest beggar. None can agree on her nature, whether the mother of the gods or an elemental force, but all acknowledge her power. In Dungeons & Dragons game terms, Fate is not given statistics, spells, or priesthoods as are most deities. This pantheon includes Hajama, Hakiyah, Haku, Jauhar, Jisan, Kor, Najm, Selan, and Zann, as well as local deities and demigods such as Bala, Ragarra, and Vataqatal.

In the distant past, a woman known only as the Loregiver penned the scrolls that clearly laid out the laws of the land, some say guided by the hand of Fate. The wisdom of this Lore was immediately recognized and became the basis of law in Zakhara. The vast majority of Al-Hadhar and most Al-Badia are Enlightened in the way of the Loregiver.

== Characters ==
Player characters in the Al-Qadim setting can choose from any of a number of character types. Al-Qadim uses the concept of character kits, a more rigid layer atop the traditional Dungeons & Dragons character classes. These kits are generally available to all characters, with certain restrictions based on the race of the character.

All standard races are present, including humans, elves, dwarves, half-elves, gnomes, and halflings, although they do not suffer many of the racial prejudices traditional to most Dungeons & Dragons campaign settings. Non-human characters are rarer than they are in other traditional Dungeons & Dragons settings, including the rest of Toril. The City of Delights accessory suggests goblins, hobgoblins, kobolds, lizard men, ogres, half-ogres, orcs, and half-orcs as appropriate PC races as well.

Standard classes allowed include all the classes from the player's handbook except specialty priests (including druids) and specialist wizards.

Kits described in the core campaign setting are as follows:

=== Warriors ===
- Askar: citizen warriors
- Corsair: swashbuckling seaborne warriors
- Desert Rider: nomadic fighters who ride horses and camels across the desert
- Faris: holy warriors fighting for their faith and their people
- Mamluk: slave warriors noted for the special tattoos they wear
- Mercenary Barbarian: warriors from abroad who come to fight for money, fame, or power
- Outland Warrior: fighters truly foreign to the land of Zakhara

=== Wizards ===
- Elemental Mage: masters of one of the four elements: sand (earth), sea (water), flame (fire), or wind (air)
- Sha' ir: wizards whose magic centers on genies and is aided by their familiars, gens (minor genies)
- Sorcerer: the most common wizards in Zakhara, who deal with two elemental forces
- Ajami: outland wizards from beyond the Land of Fate

Additional wizard kits are presented in the Complete Sha'ir's handbook, which include the Astrologer, Clockwork Mage, Digitalogist, Ghul Lord, Jackal, Mageweaver, Mystic of Nog, and Spellslayer.

=== Rogues ===
- Sa'luk: free men or women who follow their own path
- Barber: experts in the ways of the bazaar and the city
- Beggar-Thief: often overlooked, they can go places others would be noticed
- Holy Slayer: assassins working for an assassin order
- Matrud: tribal cast outs making their own way in the Land of Fate
- Merchant-Rogue: masters of the mercantile arts who carry their trade from town to town
- Rawun: the story-tellers and bards of Zakharan society

=== Priests ===
- Pragmatist: the most liberal and common of all priests who try to adapt their faith to the everyday world
- Ethoist: conservative priests who promote a particular path
- Moralist: the most conservative and intolerant among the priests
- Hakima: wise women who serve as valuable advisers to the outer tribes
- Kahin: the idol-priests of Zakhara, often champions of nature
- Mystic: eremitic priests who tend to visit populous centers to deliver prophetic pronouncements
- Outland Priest: priests who follows a faith foreign to the Land of Fate

Additional kits are presented in the "Scimitars Against the Dark" article in Dragon #198. These include the Priest Defender (Priest) and Sungazer (Wizard). In addition, the Tomb Robber (Rogue) is adapted from the Burglar kit.

== Expansion products ==
Al-Qadim had a number of support products released before the line came to an end. These include:

Accessories:

- Al-Qadim: Arabian Adventures - TSR #2126 (1992)
- Monstrous Compendium: Al-Qadim Appendix - TSR #2129 (1992)
- The Complete Sha'ir's Handbook - TSR #2146 (1994)

Boxed sets:

- Al-Qadim: Land of Fate - TSR #1077 (1992)
- City of Delights - TSR #1091 (1993)

Adventure boxes:

- ALQ1 Golden Voyages - TSR #9366 (1992)
- ALQ2 Assassin Mountain - TSR #9431 (1993)
- ALQ3 A Dozen and One Adventures - TSR #9432 (1993)
- ALQ4 Secrets of the Lamp - TSR #9433 (1993)
- Ruined Kingdoms - TSR #9440 (1994)
- Cities of Bone - TSR #9467 (1994)
- Corsairs of the Great Sea - TSR #9449 (1994)
- Caravans - TSR #9459 (1994)

Adventure module:

- Reunion - TSR #9584 (1998)

== V3.5 edition material ==
- Sha' ir core class (in Dragon 315)
- Barber, Corsair, Holy Slayer, and Mamluk prestige classes (in Dragon 321)

== See also ==
- Al-Qadim: The Genie's Curse − a computer adaptation
- Abeir-Toril − the fictional planet where the Al-Qadim, Forgotten Realms, and Oriental Adventures campaign settings take place
- Arabian Nights (Magic: The Gathering)
