= Ruined Kingdoms =

- Genre: Role-playing games
- Publisher: TSR
- Publication date: 1994
- Media type: Boxed set

Ruined Kingdoms is an accessory for the 2nd edition of the Advanced Dungeons & Dragons fantasy role-playing game, published in 1994.

== Contents ==
Ruined Kingdoms contains adventures for Al-Qadim set in long-lost Nog and Kadar. In these adventures, the player characters meet the gibbering beggar-prophet Adil, find a cursed ceramic disk, meet a pleasant mason wasp, fight yak men, and run afoul of an ancient Arch-Geomancer. Traveling to the jungles of eastern Zakhara to solve the mystery of the disk, the PCs model for three giant sisters who sculpt topiary shrubs, fight serpent cultists, visit the Isle of the Elephant, and learn that one PC is the long-lost heir of a rich merchant family.

== Publication history ==
Ruined Kingdoms was written by Steve Kurtz.

== Reception ==
Allen Varney reviewed Ruined Kingdoms for Dragon magazine #219 (July 1995). He comments on the "amazing coincidence" by which a player character turns out to be the heir of a rich family, noting that this sort of thing "happens all the time in the Al-Qadim line — and Arabian tales". Varney concludes his review by stating: "Like A Dozen and One Adventures, the structure of Ruined Kingdoms presents some problems. The framing adventure, about the disk, starts the PCs at levels 4-6, but leads to a climactic fight against extremely tough villains where 9th-12th level heroes should expect a high body count. To strengthen the party for this, the enterprising DM must fill out the scenarios between with additional adventures. Cities of Bone [...] offers possibilities."
