= Assassin Mountain =

Tabletop role-playing game supplement

- Genre: Role-playing games
- Publisher: TSR
- Publication date: 1993
- Media type: Boxed set

Assassin Mountain is an accessory for the second edition of the Advanced Dungeons & Dragons fantasy role-playing game, published in 1993.

== Contents ==
Assassin Mountain contains three adventures where players oppose a group of vigilante clerics. These are the holy slayers (assassins) of Zakhara. The first adventure is a robbery. Another features an assault into the slayers' mountain fortress, Sarahin (and wind up in its nightmarish Pit of a Thousand Voices); and a third is a sequel nine-day murder mystery set in Sarahin, where the PCs must discover who killed the slayers' leader, the Old Man of the Mountain.

== Publication history ==
Assassin Mountain was designed by Wolfgang Baur.

== Reception ==
Gene Alloway reviewed the module in a 1994 issue of White Wolf. He rated the game at 2 of 5 for Complexity, a 3 for Concepts, Playability, and Value, and a 4 for Appearance. He stated it was limited in scope but enjoyable, giving it an overall rating of 4.

Allen Varney reviewed Assassin Mountain for Dragon magazine #219 (July 1995). He called the sourcebox "inventive", noting that Baur was involved in many Al-Qadim supplements, and that Secrets of the Lamp was much more characteristic of his work than Assassin Mountain. Varney states in his conclusion of the review: "The approach in Assassin Mountain is unique in the Al-Qadim line. Eschewing a barrage of colorful magic, Baur develops a claustrophobic atmosphere of paranoia and intrigue. Character interactions drive the plot, and the occasional fire elementals and gibbering mouther are tools to develop the narrative. These morally ambiguous adventures, modern takes on classic Arabian settings, require and reward good role-playing. Several scenes here will put role-players through the wringer, and they'll love it. But the plots also assume highly pragmatic PCs. If you or your group wouldn't feel comfortable allying with assassins, steer clear. I have trouble with this idea myself, and though Assassin Mountain is an accomplished work, it's not what I think of as the stuff of Arabian adventure."
