= City of Delights =

Tabletop role-playing game supplement

- Genre: Role-playing games
- Publisher: TSR
- Publication date: 1993
- Media type: Boxed set

City of Delights is an accessory for the 2nd edition of the Advanced Dungeons & Dragons fantasy role-playing game, published in 1993.

== Contents ==
City of Delights is set in the Al-Qadim campaign setting, which focuses on the fictional land of Zakhara. The book describes Zakhara's principal city, the Golden City of Huzuz – huge, filled with every imaginable item and service, and saturated with intrigue and mystery. Each of the 800,000 citizens has a story, such as: how the merchant Khwaja al-Danaf gained his fortune; how the Talking Bird and Singing Tree came to the garden in the Palace of the Enlightened Throne; and how the Caliph's elven concubine Halima gained a winged cat.

The book provides hints on what player characters (PCs) may want to do in Huzuz: An Ethoist priest wants to preach in the great Golden Mosque, so the Mosque entry tells whom to talk to. A sha'ir wants to study with Adnan al-Raqi, Master of the Invisible, the Whisper that Thunders, so the book tells how to find his tower and how to become his apprentice. For the rogue, details are provided on sneaking into the Caliph's harem.

== Publication history ==
City of Delights was published by TSR, Inc. in 1993 as boxed set containing a 96-page locations guide, a 96-page campaign guide, 8 loose Monstrous Compendium sheets, 8 cardstock map sheets, and 2 large color maps. Design was by Tim Beach, Tom Prusa, and Steve Kurtz, with a cover by Robh Ruppel and illustrations by Karl Waller.

== Reception ==
Allen Varney reviewed City of Delights for Dragon magazine #219 (July 1995). Varney calls Huzuz "the Al-Qadim equivalent of Hollywood Baghdad". He comments on its release: "In this excellent 1993 set, three gifted designers summoned Huzuz in all its majesty, creating a true City of Delights. It's regrettable that it appeared over a year after the rulebook, for the Golden City offers an ideal starting point and base for any AQ campaign." He felt that this boxed set "succeeds where Land of Fate failed in conjuring an appropriate atmosphere". Varney commented on the cover art: "Robh Ruppel's superb cover painting shows Halima gazing placidly from a palace window on the minarets and golden domes of Huzuz, the cat by her side. This quiet piece embodies the exotic Al-Qadim campaign better than any fight scene with genies and corsairs." He also felt that "City of Delights excels in its clear view of what player characters (PCs) want to do in Huzuz." He added that "the DM struggling to digest all this will appreciate the clear, useful campaign advice, unique in the Al-Qadim line". Varney concluded the review with his evaluation: "Whether the PCs visit the Caliph's splendid palace (based on Topkapi palace in Istanbul), Mad Aja in the Grand Bazaar, the sewer lair of the evil yak-men, Gorar the singing barber, or the hidden temple of the Flamedeath Fellowship, City of Delights meets the DM's needs for an exotic Baghdadian campaign base. Though it has the same demanding learning curve as the Land of Fate [reviewed in the same column], and it really needs an index, this imaginative box should prove more immediately and easily useful."
