= HyperCad 54, Where Are You? =

Science-fiction tabletop role-playing game supplement

- Cover by Jim Holloway
- Designers: Craig Sheeley
- Publishers: Avalon Hill
- Publication: 1992; 34 years ago
- Genres: Science-fiction
- Systems: Tales From the Floating Vagabond
- ISBN: 1-56038-048-9

HyperCad 54, Where Are You? is a collection of adventures published by Avalon Hill in 1992 for the humorous science fiction role-playing game Tales From the Floating Vagabond.

== Description ==
HyperCad 54, Where Are You? is a set of five adventure scenarios involving agents of the Time Police:

1. The Return of the King
2. Raiders of the Lost Part
3. The Tragical History Tour
4. Imprisonered
5. Attack of the 50' Filksinger

The book also contains a description of the Time Police, as well as character sheets and player handouts.

== Publication history ==
Avalon Hill published Tales from the Floating Vagabond in 1991. The following year they published HyperCad 54, Where Are You, a 92-page softcover book of adventures designed by Craig Sheeley, with additional material by Phil Morrissey, interior art by Vicky Wyman, cartography by Dave Dobyski, and cover art by Jim Holloway.

== Reception ==
In the March 1993 edition of Dragon (Issue 191), Rick Swan admitted he was not a fan of the original Tales from the Floating Vagabond game, commenting that it "generated more groans than belly laughs, not a good sign from an RPG that lives and dies on the strength of its jokes." But he was pleasantly surprised by this book, saying, "the HyperCad supplement gets it right, collecting five delightfully goofy scenarios." Although Swan liked the high production values, he concluded "It's Craig Sheeley's nimble writing that makes HyperCad a keeper."

Steve Crow reviewed HyperCad 54, Where Are You? in White Wolf #41 (March, 1994), rating it a 3 out of 5 and stated that "Overall, Hypercad54 is a good, but not great, buy. There's lots of humor that isn't interrupted by gamespeak (a definite plus!). If your players need a new organization to join. Hypercad54 gives you the necessary material to run a whole campaign."
