= Giant (Dungeons & Dragons) =

Large humanoid creature in "Dungeons & Dragons"

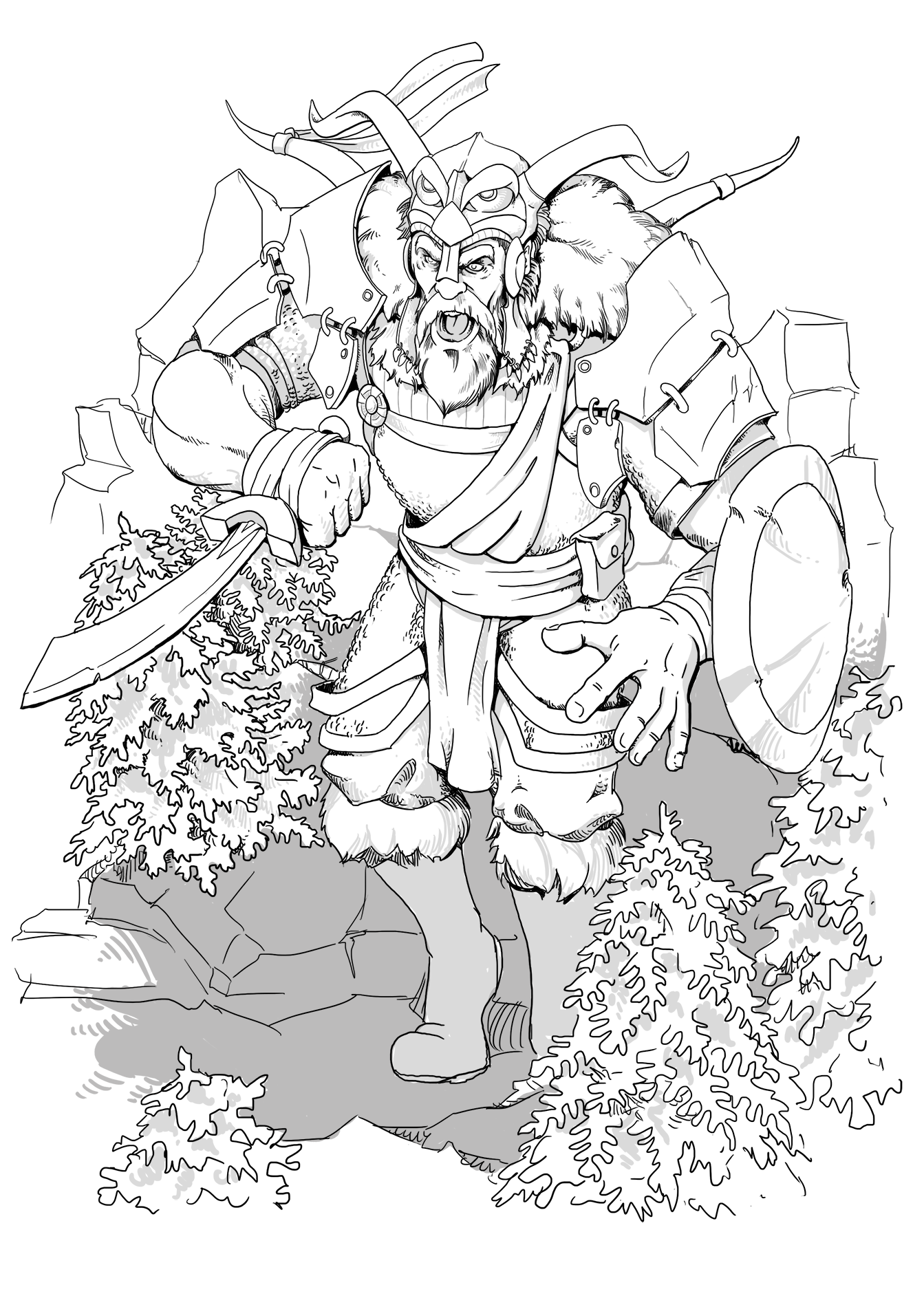
- An illustration of a giant
- First appearance: Dungeons & Dragons "white box" set (1974)
- Based on: Giant; Jötunn

In-universe information
- Type: 3rd and 3.5 editions: Giant; 4th edition: Humanoid (origin varies); 5th edition: Giant
- Alignment: Varies by type

In the Dungeons & Dragons fantasy role-playing game, giants are a collection of very large humanoid creatures based on giants of legend, or in third edition, a "creature type".

== Description ==
Giants are humanoid creatures of great strength and size with a self-involved social focus and are usually presented as the "bad guys" in the game. They "often create their own societies away from the other races". All giants have low-light vision. As a group, they have no other special abilities or immunities. Dwarves have a bonus to their armor class against attacks from creatures of the giant type, due to their experience with fighting these oversized foes.

== Creative origins ==
Giants are based both on the giants from mythology and those appearing in J.R.R. Tolkien's work. Their stone-throwing ability indicates their creative roots in wargaming. The idea of could giants "living in a castle in the clouds" can be traced back to "Jack and the Beanstalk", while the behavior of the giant in that folktale fits to D&D's hill giants. Stone, frost and fire giants specifically are based on Jötunn from Norse mythology, the latter especially on Surtr, "the evil ruler of the firey land of Muspelheim."

== Publication history ==
Giants were some of the earliest creatures introduced in the D&D game, appearing in the first 1974 edition.

=== Dungeons & Dragons (1974–1976) ===
Giants were among the first monsters introduced in the earliest edition of the game, in the Dungeons & Dragons "white box" set (1974), including the hill giant, the stone giant, the frost giant, the fire giant, and the cloud giant. The storm giant first appears in the original Greyhawk supplement (1975), where it is described as an intelligent giant found only in out-of-the-way places.

A number of unique giants appear in Supplement IV: Gods, Demi-gods & Heroes (1976), including Antero Vipunen, Hymer, Hyrm, Mimir, Mokkerkalfe, Sterkodder, Surtur, and Vafthrunder, as well as the mist giants of Melniboné.

=== Advanced Dungeons & Dragons 1st edition (1977–1988) ===
Giants appear in the first edition Monster Manual (1977), including the cloud giant, the fire giant, the frost giant, the hill giant, the stone giant, and the storm giant. The stone giant appeared as a character class in White Dwarf #17, by Lewis Pulsipher. The fog giant and the mountain giant are introduced in the first edition Fiend Folio (1981). The fomorian, the firbolg, and the verbeeg appear in the first edition Monster Manual II (1983).

The wood giant (aka voadkyn) appears in the "Dragon's Bestiary" column in Dragon #119 (March 1987).

"[R]ampaging giants" feature as the eponymous center of the trilogy of adventure modules Steading of the Hill Giant Chief, Glacial Rift of the Frost Giant Jarl, and Hall of the Fire Giant King.

=== Dungeons & Dragons (1977–1999) ===
This edition of the D&D game includes its own version of giants, in the Dungeons & Dragons Basic Set (1977), including the hill giant, the stone giant, the frost giant, the fire giant, the cloud giant, and the storm giant; these same giants also appear in the Expert Set (1981 and 1983), The mountain giant and the sea giant appear in the Dungeons & Dragons Master Rules (1985), in the Master DM's Book. The sea giant is presented as a playable character class in The Sea People (1990). Giants also appear in the Dungeons & Dragons Rules Cyclopedia (1991), including the hill giant, the stone giant, the frost giant, the fire giant, the cloud giant, the storm giant, the mountain giant, and the sea giant. The cloud giant, fire giant, frost giant, hill giant, stone giant, and storm giant also appear in the Dungeons & Dragons Game set (1991), and the Classic Dungeons & Dragons Game set (1994).

=== Advanced Dungeons & Dragons 2nd edition (1989–1999) ===
Giants appear throughout the 2nd edition Monstrous Compendium series. Giants appear first in the Monstrous Compendium Volume One (1989), including the cloud giant, the fire giant, the frost giant, the hill giant, the stone giant, and the storm giant. Giant-kin appear in the Monstrous Compendium Volume Two (1989), including the cyclops, the firbolg, the fomorian, and the verbeeg. Two more giant-kin, the voadkyn and the spriggan, appear in the Monstrous Compendium Greyhawk Appendix (1990). The spacesea giant appears in the first Monstrous Compendium Spelljammer Appendix (1990). Three Zakharan giants, including the desert giant, the jungle giant, and the reef giant appear in the Monstrous Compendium Al-Qadim Appendix (1992). The fog giant appears in the Monstrous Compendium Fiend Folio Appendix (1992). The firbolg giant-kin and the voadkyn giant-kin are detailed as playable character races in The Complete Book of Humanoids (1993),

Many of these giants are reprinted in the Monstrous Manual (1993), including the cloud giant, the cyclops, the desert giant, the ettin, the firbolg, the fire giant, the fog giant, the formorian, the frost giant, the hill giant, the jungle giant, the mountain giant, the reef giant, the stone giant, the storm giant, the verbeeg, and the wood giant (voadkyn).

The beasthead Athasian giant and the humanoid Athasian giant first appeared in the original Dark Sun Campaign Setting (1991). The beasthead Athasian giant, the desert Athasian giant, and the plains Athasian giant appear in the Monstrous Compendium Dark Sun Appendix: Terrors of Athas (1992). The beasthead Athasian giant, the desert Athasian giant, and the plains Athasian giant were later reprinted in the expanded and revised Dark Sun Campaign Setting (1995) The shadow giant appears in the Dark Sun Monstrous Compendium Appendix II: Terrors Beyond Tyr (1995). The crag giant first appeared in The Wanderers Chronicle: Mind Lords of the Last Sea (1996), and was reprinted in Monstrous Compendium Annual Volume Four (1998).

The athach and the hephaeston appear in the Monstrous Compendium Mystara Appendix (1994).

The book Giantcraft (1995) describes the giants of the Forgotten Realms campaign setting in detail.

Several giants for the Dragonlance campaign setting appear in Dragon #256 (February 1999), including the cave lords, the desolation giants, and the earth giants.

=== Dungeons & Dragons 3.0 edition (2000–2002) ===
Giants appear in the Monster Manual for this edition (2000), where they are presented as a type of creature. Giants appearing in this book include the cloud giant, the fire giant, the frost giant, the hill giant, the stone giant, and the storm giant.

The fog giant and the phaerlin giant appear in the Monstrous Compendium: Monsters of Faerûn (2001) for the Forgotten Realms setting.

The forest giant, the ocean giant, and the sun giant appear in this edition's Monster Manual II (2002).

The Jotunheim frost giant and the Muspelheim fire giant appear in Deities and Demigods (2002) for this edition.

Savage Species (2003) presents the fire giant, the frost giant, and the stone giant as both races and playable classes.

The bog giant and the shadow giant appear in the Fiend Folio (2003) for this edition.

=== Dungeons & Dragons 3.5 edition (2003–2007) ===
Giants appear in the revised Monster Manual for this edition (2003), including the cloud giant, the fire giant, the frost giant and the frost giant jarl, the hill giant, the stone giant, and the storm giant. The hill giant dire wereboar appears as a sample creature under the lycanthrope entry.

The death giant, the eldritch giant and eldritch giant confessor, and the sand giant and sand giant champion first appear in Monster Manual III (2004).

The frost giant mauler, the frost giant spiritspeaker, and the frost giant tundra scout appear in Frostburn: Mastering the Perils of Ice and Snow (2004).

The craa'ghoran giant appears in the Monster Manual IV (2006).

=== Dungeons & Dragons 4th edition (2008–2013) ===
Giants appear in the Monster Manual for this edition (2008), including death giants (the death giant and the death titan), earth giants (the hill giant and the earth titan), fire giants (the fire giant, the fire giant forgecaller, and the fire titan), and storm giants (the storm giant and the storm titan). Giant is no longer a creature type; instead, giants belong to the humanoid type. Giants generally have the natural origin, although death giants and death titans have the shadow origin, and earth, fire and storm titans have the elemental origin.

The Dungeons & Dragons 4th edition Player's Handbook 2 included the playable character race of the Goliaths (originally found in Races of Stone). These stone-skinned mountain dwellers are larger than regular races, and have giant ancestry.

Eldritch, frost, and stone giants appear in the Monster Manual 2 (2009).

The verbeeg return in the Monster Manual 3 (2010), along with additional fire, frost and hill giants, and a "giant" keyword creature, the Cthonic Apostle.

The Monster Vault (2010) reprises the earth, frost, hill, and storm giants for the Essentials line.

=== Dungeons & Dragons 5th edition (2014-present) ===
Giants, within the fifth edition of the Dungeon & Dragons Monster Manual include cloud giants, fire giants, frost giants, hill giants, stone giants, and storm giants. Each race of giants listed is no longer labeled as humanoids, as in the fourth edition, but are labeled as huge giants.

Variants of each of the "true giants" were introduced in Volo's Guide to Monsters, including cloud giant smiling ones, fire giant dreadnoughts, frost giant everlasting ones, mouths of grolantor, stone giant dreamwalkers, and storm giant quintessents. Firbolgs and goliaths were made available as player character races.

The adventure Storm King's Thunder centers around giants and details their rune magic and the sourcebook Bigby Presents: Glory of the Giants focused on giants.

== Types of giants ==
=== True giants ===
There are six types of classic "true giant" in the core Dungeons & Dragons game:

- Hill giant: Hulking, dimwitted brutes, hill giants are the smallest race of true giant. They dwell in hills and mountain valleys, foraging near-constantly in order to find food. They eat as often as possible and can digest nearly anything (including rotting meat, humanoids, plant material, and occasionally mud). This has allowed them to survive for eons as savages, relying on their own formidable size and strength to defend themselves. They typically equate size with strength, and avoid fights with dragons, other giants, and other creatures larger than themselves. Hill giants commonly have a chaotic neutral alignment.
- Stone giant: Reclusive, shy giants who are normally peaceful if left alone. They prefer to dwell in cavern networks underneath mountains. Stone giants have stone-gray skin, gaunt features, and black eyes which give them a stern appearance. Despite their size, they are lithe and graceful, and often throw rocks as means of protecting their home. Artistry ranks highly among the stone giants, and stone carving is esteemed as the greatest of skills. Usually true neutral.
- Frost giant: Frost giants are fierce, hardy warriors who dwell in the freezing northern lands, away from normal civilization. They respect only brute strength and skill in battle. Based on rime (frost) giant. Usually chaotic evil.
- Fire giant: Fire giants are master metalworkers with a strong legacy of war. They are dangerous, organized warriors who live in and around volcanos. Based on jötnar such as Surtr. Usually lawful evil.
- Cloud Giant: Proud giants who live extravagant lives high above the world, cloud giants see themselves as superior to all other giant races save the storm giants. They place much value on treasure, not just in the value of the raw materials but of the artistry and beauty of the piece. Usually neutral good or neutral evil.
- Storm giant: Isolated, contemplative seers who dwell in isolated, hard-to-reach refuges. They are wise and benevolent unless angered, but wield powerful, lightning-based magic. Usually chaotic good.

=== Other Dungeons & Dragons creatures of the giant type ===
- Cyclops
- Ettin
- Fomorian
- Ogre
- Troll

=== Beyond the Monster Manual ===
- Craa'Ghoran Giant: Rare stone giant offshoots created when earth elemental energy warped and twisted their ancestors. They can glide and walk right through stone like Earth Elementals and raise walls of stone from the ground with their supernatural powers. They resemble tanned, bestial and deformed versions of stone giants.
- Desert giant
- Death giant
- Eldritch giant: Powerful scions of arcane lore, these ancient giants spend their years seeking out fragments of knowledge. Though selfish and cruel, they are smart enough to bargain fairly when they must and perceptive enough to know that open conflict distracts them from their studies. They hate Storm Giants, though they are too involved with their pursuit of magical power to bother fighting other creatures. Eldritch Giants resemble burly but serious and wise looking Storm Giants. They have purple skin. This skin is covered with tattoos and runes. Unlike most giants, they are quite good and capable of casting spells and other magic.
- Fog giant
- Forest Giant: An elfin giant that is amongst the tallest species of giant.
- Frost Giant Everlasting One: An immortal frost giant that achieved immortality by worshiping Vaprak the Destroyer. After worshiping him and receiving dreams from him, they are sent a troll which is to be eaten. After it is eaten entirely, the frost giant gains immortality, strength, and the regenerative ability shared by trolls.
- Jungle giant
- Mountain Giant: A brute that is amongst the largest species of giant, and loves to squash people under boulders.
- Ocean Giant: A merfolk-like giant that can assume a more humanoid form to walk on land.
- Phaerlin Giant
- Reef giant
- Sand giant
- Storm Giant Quintessent: A storm giant who has achieved immortality by merging themselves with a storm, essentially turning into a never-ending storm. They have greater control over weather than typical storm giants, and are able to fashion wind and lightning into weapons.
- Sun Giant: A grim, nomadic desert-dwelling giant that survives by raising livestock.
- Wood Giant
- Other giants: When turned to life as incarnate constructs, Large sized or larger artificial humanoids, such as golems, are defined as giants.

=== Giant-kin ===
Giant-kin are large humanoids related to the 'true' giants. The mythology of the Forgotten Realms has it that the mother of all giants, Othea, cheated on her unfaithful husband, Annam, the father of giants, with Ulutiu, a minor deity associated with the Great Glacier. Othea and Ulutiu sired the four giant-kin races: Firbolgs, Verbeegs, Voadkyn, and Fomorians. Othea also conceived the ogre race with Vaprak. The name firbolgs was taken from the Fir Bolg of Irish mythology, but "the D&D description bears little resemblance to the folkloric original."

== Critical reception ==
The storm giant was ranked fourth among the ten best high-level 4th Edition monsters by the authors of Dungeons & Dragons 4th Edition For Dummies. The authors described the storm giant as being "at the top of the giant world, at least as far as the Monster Manual is concerned", as they are encountered with "hurling thunderbolts from afar, using howling winds to scatter enemies, and fighting with a lightning-edged greatsword when the battle gets up close and personal".

The elder titans, who "stand above giants and possess even more power in terms of their physical and magical capabilities", were ranked among the strongest creatures in the game by Scott Baird from Screen Rant.

Bleeding Cool found the firbolg one "of the more distinctive race options in the D&D multiverse" in a 2016 review of Volo's Guide to Monsters. In 2021, Comic Book Resources counted the firbolg as one of the "7 Underused Monster Races in Dungeons & Dragons", stating that "Firbolgs are a blend of strength and magic, making them useful for classes that blend the two. Firbolgs work well as Clerics and Druids, but they can also make for a good Ranger. Your harmony with nature will leave you definitely wanting to have a nature focus, but you'll also stand out in a crowd. As a naturally shy race, be sure to consider that when playing your character. Typically speaking, Firbolgs aren't aggressive."

Role-playing game author Graeme Davis considered Dungeons & Dragons a major factor in current perceptions that "giants and trolls are regarded as very different creatures", while the names were used interchangeably in Norse mythology.

== Other publishers ==
Giants was published by Mayfair Games in 1987 and gave in-depth descriptions both about giants already known in Advanced Dungeons & Dragons as well as new ones.

The cloud giant, fire giant, frost giant, hill giant, marsh giant, rune giant, stone giant, storm giant, and taiga giant are fully detailed in Paizo Publishing's book Giants Revisited (2012), for use with the Pathfinder Roleplaying Game.
