= Maztica Campaign Set =

Tabletop role-playing game supplement

- Author: Tim Beach, Douglas Niles
- Genre: Role-playing games
- Publisher: TSR
- Publication date: 1991
- Media type: Boxed set

Maztica Campaign Set is an accessory for the 2nd edition of the Advanced Dungeons & Dragons fantasy role-playing game. The campaign set was co-authored by Douglas Niles and Tim Beach and published by TSR, Inc. in 1991.

== Contents ==
The campaign set is based on the Maztica books Ironhelm, Viperhand, and Feathered Dragon. The campaign set comprises three main volumes. The first is a 96-page book called Journey to the True World with Maztican history and setting reference information. The second volume, Maztica Alive!, has additional information such as "terrain and climate, regions of Maztica, passage from the Sword Coast to Maztica, the afterlife, a short adventure, and four new monsters". The final 32-page book, Gods and Battles, includes rules and information on the Maztican gods as well as maps.

The Maztica setting is part of the Forgotten Realms, the "default" setting of Dungeons & Dragons. It is based "loosely" upon the ancient Aztec and Mayan civilizations, with "Maztica" being another name for the Aztecs. It includes two new kinds of magic that are independent from arcane and Faerunian holy magic, Pluma, which was created by the god Qotal the god of creation and freedom, and Hishna, created by Zaltec, the god of jaguars and war.

A Journey to the True World gives character generation rules for Maztican player characters. Races include desert dwarves, halflings, and humans. There are two warrior kits, the Eagle Knight and the Jaguar Knight, which receive special armor, and access to low-level Pluma and Hishna spells, respectively. Priests who receive access to Pluma or Hishna can use them, but only artisans, one of two new rogue classes, Plumaweavers and Hishnashapers, may learn the highest level of each. Also included are a description of Maztican currency, armor, weapons, and spells.

== Publication history ==
Douglas Niles and Tim Beach co-authored the campaign set. While the Forgotten Realms Campaign Set (1987) had mentioned other continents existed in Abeir-Toril, there were no additional details. Douglas Niles had "been working to get a Mesoamerican Realms supplement on the TSR schedule for a while. It was entirely in line with his previous development work for the Realms, when he'd created the Celtic-themed Moonshae Islands as one of the first additions the Realms. It took him two years, but he finally got the OK. First up he wrote a new trilogy of novels detailing the discovery of the new world: Ironhelm (1990), Viperhand (1990), and Feathered Dragon (1991). The Maztica Campaign Set then followed three months after the conclusion of the Maztica Trilogy".

The setting describes the new continent Maztica — the name "is a portmanteau of two Mesoamerican peoples: the Maya and the Aztec". On the development of the book, Niles said it is "thoroughly researched and historically accurate". Niles' research included tours of "numerous archaeological sites such as the Pyramids of the Sun and the Moon, Tchitchin Itza, and Uxmal" and "multiple trips to Mexico's National Museum of Archaeology". It was important to Niles to include crusaders from Faerûn as a fictional version of conquistadors – Niles said "I'd always thought the conquistadors were the closest-thing to a real-life D&D story. I just wanted to give the story a better ending".

In 2016, a PDF edition of the Maztica Campaign Set was released on the DMsGuild. In July 2020, Wizards of the Coast added a sensitivity disclaimer to legacy products for sale digitally. The disclaimer states:

We (Wizards) recognize that some of the legacy content available on this website does not reflect the values of the Dungeons & Dragons franchise today. Some older content may reflect ethnic, racial, and gender prejudice that were commonplace in American society at that time. These depictions were wrong then and are wrong today. This content is presented as it was originally created, because to do otherwise would be the same as claiming these prejudices never existed. Dungeons & Dragons teaches that diversity is a strength, and we strive to make our D&D products as welcoming and inclusive as possible. This part of our work will never end.

The disclaimer "appears twice on descriptions of D&D books that include content that resembles real-world cultures and races" such as the Maztica Campaign Set and Al-Qadim: Arabian Adventure books.

== Reception ==
Keith H. Eisenbeis reviewed the Maztica Campaign Set in the February 1992 issue of White Wolf Magazine, giving the set an overall rating of 3 of 5. He remarked on TSR's trend of building campaigns based on its novels, noting that the set "succeeds admirably" in allowing those who have read them to continue to explore the setting. Eisenbeis also commented favorably on the description of the religious aspects of the setting (e.g., gods, priests, and afterlife). He noted as a potential problem the relatively little magic in the Maztica setting: a "group of low to mid level adventurers" imported from outside the continent could "wreak havoc". Eisenbeis concluded that the set "score[d] high for the role-player, moderately well for the problem solver and action seeker, and poorly for the power seekers".

In a retrospective review of Maztica Campaign Set in Black Gate, Scott Taylor said "Niles was challenged in this project to create a Mesoamerican world that mingles with the fantasy setting of the Forgotten Realms. In my opinion, after several so-so attempts at reading this set, he fails to deliver on what would make such a setting uniquely cool, ala demi-humans! The work tends to bog down in a kind of repetition of real-world conquistadors waging a campaign against indigenous peoples of the far south continents where the only change in the story line is that the priests actually had working magic."
