= Caravans (Al-Qadim) =

Dungeons & Dragons supplement

- Genre: Role-playing games
- Publisher: TSR
- Publication date: 1994
- Media type: Boxed set

Caravans is an accessory for the second edition of the Advanced Dungeons & Dragons fantasy role-playing game, published in 1994.

== Contents ==
Caravans is an Al-Qadim adventure in which the eponymous caravan serves to move the characters (levels 5–9) across the High Desert in western Zakhara. If the player characters feed ancient poetry to the Persian rug Ala'i the Hungry during the adventure, Ala'i gives them clues by blacking in parts of its weave. Other encounters include a talking tent, weird lightning on a high rock spire, broom-wielding copper automatons, giant roc skeletons, bug-eating centaurs, and an efreeti palace beneath the Pit of Ghuls.

== Publication history ==
Caravans was written by Rick Swan, and includes a full-color 21" X 30" poster map.

== Reception ==
Allen Varney reviewed Caravans for Dragon magazine #219 (July 1995). He comments: "Although caravan journeys have long made for romantic adventures, soap operas of the desert, this box actually deals little with caravans in themselves. Rather, its caravan serves as an excuse to move the characters [across the desert]. In missing this chance, the sourcebox reads like some old Spelljammer adventures where PCs travel through space to another world, then go on an ordinary dungeon adventure." Varney concludes his review by saying: "That said, I still like this set. Sure, the scenario is linear, and NPCs get some of the best lines, but just guess what's on the [...] map. Terrain maps, ship plans, a palace, a mosque? No, a rug! It's a beautiful Persian-style rug with a name, Ala'i the Hungry [...] I could talk about the rest of the neat stuff in this box [...] but admit it, the rug has already convinced you, right?"
