= Corsairs of the Great Sea =

- Genre: Role-playing games
- Publisher: TSR
- Publication date: 1994
- Media type: Boxed set

Corsairs of the Great Sea is an accessory for the 2nd edition of the Advanced Dungeons & Dragons fantasy role-playing game, published in 1994.

== Contents ==
Corsairs of the Great Sea offers five adventures (plus a sixth encounter), one of which sends the player characters after an evil ghul cult that is sacrificing children, a couple of others depend crucially on traitors betraying the PCs, and in one the PCs are spies.

== Publication history ==
Corsairs of the Great Sea was written by Nicky Rea.

== Reception ==
Allen Varney reviewed Corsairs of the Great Sea for Dragon magazine #219 (July 1995). He described Corsairs of the Great Sea as "Lightest in content and least cohesive of the sourceboxes", called the five adventures "routine" and the sixth encounter "filler", noting that they "sort of feature corsairs, or take place in corsair cities, or, well, appear in a sourcebox with "corsairs" in the title", and that "all these notions seem badly out of place in an Arabian campaign". Varney stated in his conclusion of the review: "This box makes more references than usual to the Forgotten Realms, where Zakhara is nominally placed. I'm uncomfortable with this, because the Realms already have three desert cultures (including one, Anauroch, with the same cultural roots as the Al-Qadim setting), and because Zakhara is more than a different place, it's a different genre of adventure. But Corsairs even brings in a spelljamming ship from Kara-Tur, which is about as non-Arabian as you get. The good news is, this is the only weak entry in an exceptionally strong line."
