= The Complete Sha'ir's Handbook =

- Genre: Role-playing games
- Publisher: TSR
- Publication date: 1994
- Pages: 126

The Complete Sha'ir's Handbook is an accessory for the 2nd edition of the Advanced Dungeons & Dragons fantasy role-playing game, published in 1994.

== Contents ==
The Complete Sha'ir's Handbook covers sha'irs and also the elemental mages of Zakhara. Presented in the familiar "Complete Handbook" format. it gives role-playing and campaign advice (apprentices, dueling practices), new wizard kits (astrologer, numerologist, clockwork mage, and others), almost a dozen secret magical societies, and ten pages of new spells and proficiencies. The Mechanician, for example, crafts clockwork automata to cast his spells.

This book details the wizards of the Al-Qadim setting, including the core kits of Sha'ir, Sorcerer, and Elemental Mage. It also introduces a number of additional kits.

== Publication history ==
The Complete Sha'ir's Handbook was written by Sam Witt and published by TSR as a 128-page softcover.

Shannon Appelcline, the author of Designers & Dragons, highlighted that "TSR stopped using module codes in 1994, but The Complete Sha'ir's Handbook is clearly the third book in the 'CGR' series. Like its predecessors, it combines the crunchy kits of the Complete PHBR series (1989-1995) with the background of a specific campaign world".

== Reception ==
Gene Alloway reviewed the manual in a 1995 issue of White Wolf. Alloway noted that the handbook filled an information gap in the Al Qadim setting, stating that, "The four key additions—Gen rules, kits, societies and spells—make the Handbook a must for any Al-Qadim player". Out of 5 possible points, he rated it at a 3 for Complexity and Value, a 4 for Appearance and Playability, and a 5 for Concepts, with an overall rating of 3.5.

Allen Varney reviewed The Complete Sha'ir's Handbook for Dragon magazine #219 (July 1995). Varney comments: "The kits work well, especially the Mechanician [...] But the societies come out of nowhere, adding a needless layer of campaign complexity ungrounded in Arabian folktales or the Zakharan campaign. If you want a secret society of desert mages, play in the Dark Sun world. Flatly written and wordy, The Complete Sha'ir's Handbook offers some useful advice on topics like genie prisons and caring for familiars, but its new spells look unusually powerful, as does the wizard assassin called the Spellslayer. Look before buying.

In Issue 17 of the Australian game magazine Australian Realms, Lee Sheppard commented "The Al-Qadim campaign setting is one of the best things that TSR has done in a long time, and this latest release continues that tradition of excellence." Sheppard also noted, "The overall quality of the writing, and the way the mood of the campaign setting permeates every page. You really can feel the harsh desert wind, hear the chants of the priests from the minarets, see the blue oceans lapping against rocky shores." Sheppard concluded, "The Shaiir's Handbook should not only interest those who use the Al-Qadim campaign setting, but anyone interested in playing a different type of wizard character. For those of you who are playing in the world of Zakhara, or somewhere similar, this should be considered an essential purchase."

In 2013, Alex Lucard, for Diehard GameFAN, wrote that "Al-Qadim wasn't the most popular campaign setting, but I do feel it deserves a little love, and I really enjoyed the Sha’ir handbook. More importantly, this particular sourcebook is essentially all about Wizards, and thus makes an excellent supplement for anyone playing a magic user in 2e. [...] With a ton of new spells, information on sorcerous societies and so much more, anyone who enjoys playing a Mage in 2e would get a kick out of this book and find great new concepts for role-playing. The book is versatile enough that you could easily use it with other campaign settings, and it’s unique enough (especially with that desert yellow cover) to make curious players pick it up and start their journey in the Al-Qadim universe".

Shannon Appelcline commented that "though The Complete Sha'ir's Handbook mostly focuses on crunchy kits and other rules, it also detailed the wizardly societies of Al-Qadim, including the Brotherhood of the True Flame and many others. Wizardly societies were apparently in vogue at the time, as TSR had published DSR3: 'Veiled Alliance' (1992) for Dark Sun just a few years previous — though some reviewers thought such societies were better suited for Athas than the land of Al-Qadim".
