= Secrets of the Lamp =

1993 Dungeons & Dragons supplement

- Genre: Role-playing games
- Publisher: TSR
- Publication date: 1993
- Media type: Boxed set

Secrets of the Lamp is an accessory for the 2nd edition of the Advanced Dungeons & Dragons fantasy role-playing game, published in 1993.

== Contents ==
In Secrets of the Lamp, Zakhara's multitudes of djinn, jann, dao, efreeti, and the rest are for player characters to command. Its centerpiece is a detailed description of the famous genie City of Brass. This city, which floats on an endless lake of burning oil, is featured in a poster map and on story cards and monster sheets.

A lengthy scenario in the 32-page adventure booklet sends the PCs (levels 4–7) all over the City of Brass. An efreeti physician falls instantly in love with one of the heroes. The physician imprisons the party, and soon they run into trouble with his two current wives, his albino nightmare, patrolling salamanders, and the Sultan of the Efreet.

The 64-page "Genie Lore" book describes the Sevenfold Mazework of the Great Dismal Delve, the Court of Ice and Steel, the Great Padishah of the Marid, genie sorcerers, new magic, and the details of genie wishes.

== Publication history ==
Secrets of the Lamp was written by Wolfgang Baur, and published by TSR in 1993.

== Reception ==
Gene Alloway reviewed the product in a 1994 issue of White Wolf. He rated the game at 2 of 5 for Complexity, a 3 for Concepts, and a 4 for Appearance, Playability and Value. He stated that it is an "essential supplement for any Al-Qadim campaign", giving it an overall rating of 4.

Allen Varney reviewed Secrets of the Lamp for Dragon magazine #219 (July 1995). He called the sourcebox itself "entertaining" and the poster map of the City of Brass "nice". He noted that with the efreet in the adventure scenario falling in love with one of the heroes, that "this kind of thing happens all the time in the Al-Qadim line". He comments further on the adventure: "It's all rambunctious excitement and daring exploits, enhanced by fanatic efreet warriors, sparktail scorpions, and the bumbling djinni Hazim the Fool. However, the DM should take care to keep things on track, because if the PCs fail, they end up slaves for seven years." Of the "Genie Lore" book, Varney comments that "Baur hints at many colorful story possibilities", and states that "We don’t get much more than imaginative hints, but in these quantities that might be all you need. Instead of developing one situation, try blitzing the players with a bunch of them. It worked fine for the Arabian Nights storytellers, and the modern role-playing gamemaster works very much in their tradition."
