= Test of the Samurai =

Advanced Dungeons & Dragons adventure module

- Code: OA7
- Authors: Rick Swan
- First published: 1990

Linked modules
- OA1 OA2 OA3 OA4 OA5 OA6 OA7

Test of the Samurai is an adventure module published in 1990 for the second edition of theAdvanced Dungeons & Dragons fantasy role-playing game.

== Plot summary ==
Test of the Samurai is a Kara-Tur adventure scenario in which the player characters explore the unusual occurrences and monsters appearing in the Wa peninsula.

== Publication history ==
OA7 Test of the Samurai was written by Rick Swan, with a cover by Jim Holloway, and was published by TSR in 1990 as an 80-page booklet with a large color map and an outer folder.
