= Tales from the Floating Vagabond =

Tabletop role-playing game

Tales from The Floating Vagabond
A tabletop roleplaying game of high adventure and low comedy in the best dang bar in the multiverse!
- Cover art of first edition core book
- Designers: Lee Garvin
- Illustrators: Scott Lincoln, Kira Woodmansee
- Writers: Sean Ellis, Sandy Antunes, Bill Keyes
- Publishers: Avalon Hill (first edition), Floating Vagabond LLC (second edition)
- Publication: 1991; 35 years ago
- Genres: Comedy
- Players: 3-7
- Website: floatingvagabondrpg.com

Tales from The Floating Vagabond is a comedy science-fiction role-playing game created by Lee Garvin, first published by Avalon Hill in 1991. A line of support books appeared through 1993. The first edition's tagline, "Ludicrous Adventure in a Universe Whose Natural Laws Are Out To Lunch," evoked the game's signature humor.

A second edition of Tales from The Floating Vagabond was released as a PDF in December 2023, followed by a physical book in February 2025. TF2V is notable in the role-playing community for being resurrected after Garvin's sudden death in 2019.

== Overview ==
Tales from The Floating Vagabond (sometimes abbreviated TF2V) expresses love for pop culture through parody. It's filled with references and in-jokes for fans of science fiction, fantasy, anime, comic books, and action movies. Comedic footnotes accompany the main text, similar in style to The Hitchhiker's Guide to the Galaxy and Terry Pratchett's Discworld series of novels, both major inspirations for the game.

Unlike many RPGs, which are set in a specific world with a unifying theme, TF2V is deliberately designed to kit-bash different genres together and let players revel in the resulting chaos. The game encourages players to start their adventures in the eponymous Floating Vagabond, a bar built into an asteroid in the midst of a pocket dimension full of leftover refuse from the creation of the multiverse. The bar's owner, a human named Hawk "Spit" Luger, installed a random dimensional portal generator in the front door, which picks up hapless people from a multitude of worlds and deposits them in The Floating Vagabond. As a result, a game of TF2V could easily include an elf from a high-fantasy world, a human ninja from medieval Japan, and a carnivorous teddy bear from a planet of living cartoons. The flexibility of the rules system allows for making characters from any genre, epoch, or world, as well as creating new species.

Tales from The Floating Vagabond uses a standard set of polyhedral dice with the addition of a 30-sided and a 100-sided die, which players usually need to roll low on in order to succeed. The mechanics and terminology frequently reflect bar culture. For example, the gamemaster in a game of TF2V is referred to as the Bartender while the players are called Patrons. Critical successes are called "Chugs" and critical failures are "Spills." The second edition introduces a new set of mechanics for characters who imbibe, and both editions of the game feature novelty cocktails with ridiculous names like "Essence of Fuzzy Things" and the "Singularity."

== Features ==
One of the game's most distinctive features is a system of Shticks that give characters unusual abilities. They include:

- The Rambo Effect: The player can dodge automatic gunfire at close range (and only at close range).
- The Harpo Effect: The player can pull any mundane item out of their trenchcoat, but only if a different party member has already brought up the need for that item.
- The Elfman Effect: The player obtains a personal soundtrack that can warn them of danger or other upcoming events. Alternatively, it can give everyone on their side a bonus to morale.
- The Roy Rogers Effect: The player can make any trick shot they can imagine, eliminating all cover their target may be behind. Of course, they can't actually kill anyone except at high noon...
- The Dolittle Effect: Allows the player to communicate with animals, all of which start out being friendly. Of course, since they're all friendly, they follow the player everywhere...
- The Flynn Effect: Allows the player to swing on a chandelier, vine, or bullwhip without worrying about it breaking... or needing an attachment point at the upper end. Or needing to find one, for that matter.
- The Valentino Effect: About what it sounds like. Everyone of the appropriate gender is crazy about the player.
- The Schwarzenegger Effect: Allows the player to operate without wound penalties... as long as nobody ever sees the player receive first aid.
- The Newton Effect: Allows the player to stop anything that contradicts their understanding of the laws of physics from happening around them.
- The Escher Effect: Allows the player to act in a way that contradicts the laws of physics.
- The Doe Effect: Gives the player 'one of those faces.' NPCs constantly confuse the character for an old friend.
- The Bay Effect: Grants the player the ability to ignore all damage from one explosion... provided they're facing away from it.

As a genre-mixing game, Tales from The Floating Vagabond doesn't really distinguish between magical, cybernetic, and mutant powers and handles them all with the system of "Cheese." Characters may spend points on Cheese powers like flight and telekinesis, but they must offset them with "Cheese Stink," i.e. drawbacks that help balance the game. Creator Lee Garvin began introducing Cheese powers in supplements and adventure modules, and the system was finally revised and codified into the second edition.

== Publication history ==
After Hasbro bought Avalon Hill in 1998, the company's focus shifted away from tabletop role-playing games. After a lengthy intellectual property dispute, the copyright for the text of Tales from The Floating Vagabond reverted to Lee Garvin. He released the original game in PDF via OneBookShelf stores and announced plans for a second edition. Although TF2V was only in print for a handful of years, it had amassed a small but dedicated following. Garvin launched a Kickstarter campaign on August 1, 2013 to raise funds for the second edition and engage the help of artists Scott Lincoln and Kira Woodmansee. The Kickstarter reached its funding goal on September 12 and Garvin began adding stretch goals.

Unfortunately, in November 2013, Garvin developed a case of pneumonia so severe he had to be hospitalized. After being in a coma for several weeks, he was forced to put development of TF2V on the back burner to focus on his rehabilitation. Garvin continued to work on the new version of Tales from The Floating Vagabond and produce other games whenever possible, but his health never fully recovered. Complications from the illness led to subsequent hospitalizations and an ever-increasing cascade of medical bills, which Garvin was forced to use the Kickstarter funds to cover. He died of a sudden heart attack on June 28, 2019, leaving behind an unfinished game, his beloved dog Mal, and a small but loyal cohort of mourning fans.

In the months following his death, four of Lee Garvin's friends decided to keep his legacy alive by finishing Tales from The Floating Vagabond. They obtained permission from his brother and sole surviving family member to take over the intellectual property and set to work. Writers Sean Ellis, Sandy Antunes, and Bill Keyes rescued every file they could from Garvin's computer and began the painstaking process of organizing and editing his notes. Art director Kira Woodmansee, who had collaborated with Garvin on earlier RPGs, shepherded the second edition to completion, first as a PDF in December 2023, then in softcover in February 2025. The writers immortalized Garvin as an NPC in his own game, the disreputable arms dealer "Honest" Lee, who supposedly faked his death in a crowdfunding scheme in order to escape to The Floating Vagabond.

Woodmansee and Ellis formed Floating Vagabond LLC to protect the copyright from future legal limbo.Tales from The Floating Vagabond is currently available exclusively at DriveThruRPG.com.

== Modules and Supplements ==
- Bar Wars (1991)
- The Reich Stuff (1991)
- HyperCad 54, Where Are You? (1992)
- Adventure With No Name (1992)
- Weirder Tales...a Space Opera (1992)
- The Cosmic Paternity Suit (1993)
- Where's George? (1993)

== Reception ==
=== First Edition ===
Steve Crow reviewed Tales from the Floating Vagabond in White Wolf #29 (Oct./Nov., 1991), rating it a 2 out of 5 and stated that "Overall, I would not recommend Vagabond unless you are a GM who runs comedy RPGs like Toon or Paranoia. You can get some good ideas, and the low price tag makes a reasonable buy. However, if you are not already running comedy RPGs, you'll be cast adrift."

In the March 1993 edition of Dragon (Issue 191), Rick Swan thought this game "generated more groans than belly laughs, not a good sign from an RPG that lives and dies on the strength of its jokes."

=== Second Edition ===
YouTuber The Real John Wick featured the second edition of TF2V during his 31 Day Challenge, in which he created 31 characters from different RPG systems in December 2023. He described the process of creating a xenomorph-like character as "pretty quick" and said of the game, "I recommend it because it made me laugh. A lot."

The second edition has been well-received, with only five-star reviews on DriveThruRPG since the publication of the second edition PDF. Reviewers write:

"Fantastic realization Lee's vision. The Training Montage rules are classic, and the Drunk Dice add a great mechanic. The Harpo Effect remains my favorite."

"Phenomenal game, simple, fun mechanics. Well written book. One of my all time favorites with updated mechanics."

"An utterly classic, mayhem-fuelled [sic] RPG. I played this game in its first iteration, and was saddened to hear of Lee's passing. The assumption at the time was that all chances for a second edition went with him, and so our gaming group has been giddily bounding about upon learning that Lee's madcap invention had been released anew. A very simple system, easy to pick up and utterly wacky, it will no doubt act as the vehicle for another long stream of insane antics at our roleplay table. We'll be sure to knock back a few rounds at the Floating Vagabond for Lee, and toast the exemplary efforts of his friends in bringing his hard work to life once more."

== Other reviews ==
- Casus Belli #66
