= Al-Qadim: Arabian Adventures =

Tabletop role-playing game supplement

Arabian Adventures
- Cover art by Jeff Easley
- Rules required: Advanced Dungeons & Dragons
- Campaign setting: Al-Qadim
- Authors: Jeff Grubb
- First published: 1992
- Pages: 158
- ISBN: 1-56076-358-2

Arabian Adventures is an accessory for the 2nd edition of the Advanced Dungeons & Dragons fantasy role-playing game, published in 1992.

== Contents ==
Arabian Adventures offers over 40 pages of player character kits, including the sha'ir, barber-thieves, beggar-thieves, and other rogues, as well as other characteristically Arabian roles such as merchants, moralistic priests, hakimas (wise women), mystics, mamluks, corsairs, and elemental wizards. Each kit includes benefits, hindrances, and discussion of the kit's societal role in the desert of Zakhara, the Land of Fate. The rulebook also includes rules for calling upon Fate, the Evil Eye, and discussions of honor, piety, the salt bond, and other characteristics of Arabian society. The rulebook offers a comprehensive list of desert equipment, lists of spells with a desert motif, Arab character names, and proficiencies like Haggling and Display Weapon Prowess.

== Publication history ==
Arabian Adventures was published by TSR, Inc. as a 160-page softcover AD&D campaign rulebook. Design was by Jeff Grubb with Andria Hayday, a cover by Jeff Easley, and illustrations by Karl Waller.

== Reception ==
Gene Alloway reviewed the Al-Qadim complete roleplaying game in White Wolf #34 (Jan./Feb., 1993), rating it a 5 out of 5 and stated that "Al-Qadim is an exceptional sourcebook with good research, writing, graphics and playability. It sets a tone and a mood that immediately draws a reader in and gets the mind going. It sets a high standard for other works in the series, and I hope that future additions meet that standard. Even if you do not play AD&D or are merely interested in the idea of Arabian adventures, I strongly urge you to pick up this work. You will not be disappointed."

Allen Varney reviewed Arabian Adventures for Dragon magazine #219 (July 1995). He begins by saying: "You know from the first sentence of the original 160-page softcover rulebook that the Al-Qadim campaign setting emphasizes pop cinematic Arabia over scholarly accuracy. "Ali Baba and the Forty Thieves," "Aladdin and His Magic Lamp"—these and other classics fill the pages of the Arabian Nights. No, they don't. European translators introduced both Ali Baba and Aladdin as spurious additions to the Nights, back in the 1800s. But what of that? Would you want an Arabian role-playing campaign that didn't include them?" He suggests that the player character kits in Arabian Adventures "make up the outstanding section of the rules, still unsurpassed to this day by other AD&D campaign worlds. The most creative of these, the signature class of the Al-Qadim world, remains the sha'ir, the wizard who gets his magic by sending a genie or elemental familiar to fetch spells. Original and ingeniously balanced, the sha'ir class gains its greatest appeal from the role-playing opportunities inherent in negotiating with a genie or a dimwitted familiar." In reviewing the book a few years after its release, Varney commented: "With hindsight we can identify [Arabian Adventures] as an important step in TSR's transition to its current graphic design philosophy, a precursor of the Planescape line and other beautiful products. The Al-Qadim rulebook's gold page borders, elegant endpapers, and six full color plates made a striking impression. Just as important, the Al-Qadim line marked the first time TSR used one artist for interior illustration throughout a whole line: the remarkable Karl Waller, whose atmospheric work conveys exactly the textures, exoticism, muscular genies, and empty desert expanses appropriate to the game line." He went on to say: "Still, even in its time the Arabian Adventures rulebook fell short of perfection. Though pretty, it lacks a distinctive writing style and sense of atmosphere. [...] does it simulate the flavor of the Arabian Nights tales? Only in part." He commented that the character kits "have flavor to spare", and Waller's art "inspires many adventure ideas. Yet for all their beauty, these pages only rarely describe the elements of Arabian adventures—the causes that assassins die for, the bargains that genies make, ambitions and aspirations of PCs, and the conventions of Arabian folktales. There is no attempt at all to describe what you actually do in an Al-Qadim campaign: explore the southern seas, wage holy war, stage palace intrigues, and so on. (This lack was remedied, in part, only in early 1994, in Gregory W. Detwiler's excellent article "Campaign Journal: Arabian Adventures Galore" in Dragon Magazine #202.)" He commented further, saying that the rulebook's "lack of Arabian flavor may derive partly from the uneasy relationship between the Arabian Nights adventures and standard AD&D rules. It's hard enough justifying elves and dwarves in this setting, and there's a worse lack. The Al-Qadim campaign accepts slavery and polygamy as facts of life, and dispassionately discusses the ways of holy slayers, but it never dares hint at that ultimate taboo of all AD&D campaign worlds, monotheism. We must presume that developing a fantasy equivalent of Allah would offend Muslims, whereas compromising Islamic culture with a polytheistic hodgepodge is just fine. No doubt TSR also wished to avoid unpleasant links to the modern Islamic world in the wake of the 1991 Gulf War." Varney concluded the review by saying: "The Al-Qadim rulebook impeccably presents a good set of tools for building an Arabian AD&D campaign, although it leaves the actual construction work to you—or to the host of supplements that followed. Given the fine quality of most of those supplements, this core product becomes essential for Arabian AD&D adventure."
