= Blood of the Yakuza =

Dungeons & Dragons adventure module

- Code: OA4
- Rules required: 1st ed. AD&D
- Campaign setting: Generic
- Authors: David Cook
- First published: 1987

Linked modules
- OA1 OA2 OA3 OA4 OA5 OA6 OA7

Blood of the Yakuza is a module in the Oriental Adventures subset of the Advanced Dungeons & Dragons Forgotten Realms product line.

== Plot summary ==
Blood of the Yakuza is an Oriental Adventures campaign setting and adventure scenario set on the island of Wa and port of Nakamura. The module contains details Yakuza gangs and the important families and temples, as well as the major non-player characters of the city.

As the module was based on the Kara Tur boxed set, its information is older than the information about Wa found in such product lines as the Spelljammer series.

== Publication history ==
Blood of the Yakuza was written by David "Zeb" Cook, with a cover by Jim Holloway, and was published by TSR in 1987 as a forty-eight page book and a sixteen-page book, with a large color map and an outer folder.

== Reception ==
Jim Bambra reviewed Blood of the Yakuza for Dragon magazine No. 134. Bambra felt that the island of Wa "draws its inspiration from the Tokugawa Shogunate of Japan and presents a more centralized and less war-torn period". He concluded that Blood of the Yakuza is another excellent addition to the Oriental line.
