= Adventure With No Name =

1992 role-playing adventure module

Adventure With No Name is a 1992 role-playing adventure for Tales from the Floating Vagabond published by Avalon Hill.

== Contents ==
Adventure With No Name is an adventure in which the player characters use time travel to stop light beer and pretzels from being used at the Floating Vagabond bar.

== Reception ==
Steve Crow reviewed Adventure With No Name in White Wolf #32 (July/Aug., 1992), rating it a 5 out of 5 and stated that "Overall, No Name is an excellent comedy adventure and the complaints are minor. I really can't find anything negative to say about Adventure With No Name. For the first time since I've read Tales of the Floating Vagabond, I am looking forward to future Floating Vagabond releases."
