= Where's George? (Tales from the Floating Vagabond) =

Where's George? is a 1993 role-playing adventure for Tales from the Floating Vagabond published by Avalon Hill.

== Plot summary ==
Where's George? is an adventure in which the player characters use time travel to find out who has been changing history in the United States.

== Reception ==
Steve Crow reviewed Where's George in White Wolf #38 (1993), rating it a 4 out of 5 and stated that "I recommend Where's George to the discriminating Floating Vagabond player or gamemaster."

== Reviews ==
- Roleplayer Independent (Volume 1, Issue 7 - Jun 1993)
- Shadis #10
