= Land of Fate =

Tabletop role-playing game supplement

- Genre: Role-playing games
- Publisher: TSR
- Publication date: 1992
- Media type: Boxed set

Land of Fate is an accessory for the 2nd edition of the Advanced Dungeons & Dragons fantasy role-playing game, published in 1992.

== Contents ==
The Land of Fate set described the fictional land of Zakhara in the Al-Qadim campaign setting at length. Land of Fate describes the maps, geography, routines of daily life, fashion, customs, organizations, class status, the legal system, magical items, languages, calendars, 12 different desert tribes, 17 deities or deity types, and 27 city writeups in the "Adventurer’s Guide to Zakhara," along with DM-only secrets for each city in the "Fortunes and Fates" book.

== Publication history ==
Land of Fate was published by TSR, Inc. as a boxed set containing a 128-page locations guide, a 64-page campaign guide, 8 loose Monstrous Compendium sheets, 12 cardstock mapsheets, 3 large color maps, and a plastic hex scale. Design was by Jeff Grubb with Andria Hayday, the cover was by Fred Fields, and illustrations by Karl Waller.

== Reception ==
Gene Alloway reviewed Al-Qadim: Land of Fate Boxed Set in White Wolf #34 (Jan./Feb., 1993), rating it a 4 out of 5 and stated that "Al-Qadim: Land of Fate is an excellent addition to the Al-Qadim series. It expands the campaign world immensely and provides even more depth to an already fascinating place to 'visit.' Players will enjoy it a great deal. All it takes is some time and a lamp and a carpet ..."

Allen Varney reviewed Land of Fate for Dragon magazine #219 (July 1995). He began by saying: "It makes sense, unfortunately, that the Land of Fate box quickly followed the Al-Qadim rulebook as its first supplement. The rulebook briefly introduced the setting of Zakhara, but this set described it at length. A campaign needs this basic data", but with everything in Land of Fate, he said, "It's all very large." He went on to say: "In principle the jottings of a campaign set can be satisfying in themselves. In the Land of Fate set, they make for dry reading. We get a useful chapter on all aspects of daily life, and a couple of wonderful sidebar articles on the Zakharan coffee ceremony ("the measure of a good host") and pearl diving, the stuff of memorable scenes in an adventure. The rest is a sandstorm of little details, one-paragraph character outlines, societal tidbits (we're told twice that worshippers in Zakhara "prostrate" themselves), and jottings. With work you could assemble any dozen jottings into a free-wheeling adventure like the loose-jointed Arabian Nights tales, where one thing follows another without much logic. But not much of Land of Fate matches the screwy imagination of the best Nights tales. At times the designer's creativity clearly flags, such as in this candid beginning to an entry describing the secrets of Hilm: "The City of Kindness is boring." And, as with the rulebook, there is no hint in all these pages of how to develop these jottings into a memorable, characteristically Arabian campaign." Varney concluded the review by saying: "Parts of the Land of Fate boxed set enhance any Al-Qadim campaign, but its length is excessive and its inspiration uneven. Unless you plan to construct a long, ambitious campaign, you can probably get along without this box."
