= Weirder Tales...a Space Opera =

Weirder Tales...a Space Opera is a 1992 role-playing adventure for Tales from the Floating Vagabond published by Avalon Hill.

== Plot summary ==
Weirder Tales...a Space Opera is an adventure in which the player characters get pulled into an adventure across time and space.

== Reception ==
Steve Crow reviewed Weirder Tales...a Space Opera in White Wolf #42 (April, 1994), rating it a 3 out of 5 and stated that "Overall, Weirder Tales is a good buy. It starts out slow, but picks up speed and humor at the end. For the price you pay, you get a lot in 84 pages."
