= Bar Wars (Tales From the Floating Vagabond) =

Bar Wars is a 1991 role-playing supplement for Tales from the Floating Vagabond published by Avalon Hill.

== Plot summary ==
Bar Wars is a supplement in which a cult of men in black robes that call themselves the Teeth of Gree have been assaulting bars.

Bar Wars was the first supplement/adventure published by Avalon Hill for Tales from the Floating Vagabond.

== Reception ==
Steve Crow reviewed Bar Wars in White Wolf #30 (Feb., 1992), rating it a 3 out of 5 and stated that "In summary, Bar Wars is a satisfactory comedy adventure. It provides good laughs and answers some of the complaints I had with the basic game in my earlier review. What more can you ask for?"
