= Golden Voyages =

1992 role-playing game accessory

- Genre: Role-playing games
- Publisher: TSR
- Publication date: 1992

Golden Voyages is an accessory for the 2nd edition of the Advanced Dungeons & Dragons fantasy role-playing game, published in 1992.

== Contents ==
In Golden Voyages, the player characters are cast adrift on the Crowded Sea, then sent on side-trips to the Strait of Sorrow and the Steaming Isles.

David Cook calls this "Sinbad in a box." The linking story sends the PCs on a rambling ocean voyage to seek a Great Treasure in an archipelago thick with wonders. The Dungeon Master (DM) chooses one of ten Treasures suited to the inclinations of his group (power gamers, warlords, role-players, story-tellers, or puzzle solvers), then plants clues that lure the PCs through seven mini-adventures in any order the DM likes.

== Publication history ==
Golden Voyages was written by David "Zeb" Cook, and published by TSR, Inc.

== Reception ==
Rick Swan reviewed Golden Voyages for Dragon magazine #198 (October 1993). He recommends the adventure for Dungeon Masters who can't get their AD&D Al-Qadim campaigns off the ground: "Check out this dazzler of an adventure, a seamless blend of role-playing, problem solving, and swashbuckling action", which was "Loosely based on the legends of Sinbad". He suggests that the "inventive format" of the adventure "allows the Dungeon Master to shuffle the encounters without affecting the plot. He can also tailor the rewards to fit the players’ personalities; successful Story-Tellers may be given a Book of Lore (which grants the equivalent of a legend lore spell once per week), while Power Gamers might earn a Blade of Mastery (an ethereal weapon that boosts ability scores). This is first-rate."

Gene Alloway reviewed the module in a 1993 issue of White Wolf Magazine. He called it an "excellent work", rating it a 4 out of a possible 5. He gave it positive marks for organization and originality.

Allen Varney reviewed Golden Voyages for Dragon magazine #219 (July 1995). He calls the linking story "impressive in its transparency". Varney concludes his review by stating: "Zeb Cook doesn't sink the PCs as often as the tales sank Sinbad; that happened at least once per voyage, if memory serves. Nonetheless, he captures perfectly the atmosphere and morality of the setting. Island fish! Lodestones that pull metal from hundreds of yards away! Black pearls that cause maelstroms, an Isle of Sadness where melancholy inhabitants seek the True Sorrow, a notorious thief who by an amazing coincidence looks exactly like a PC! The adventures here practically glow with the spirit of the Arabian Nights. We also get plenty of information on dhows, baghlas, booms, and other vessels; details on hiring crews and running journeys, and stories, stories, stories. Though its profusion of little booklets and sheets challenges the DM's tracking ability — can you find the adventure's finale? — Golden Voyages still makes an excellent introduction to Al-Qadim adventuring."
