= The Cosmic Paternity Suit =

The Cosmic Paternity Suit is a 1993 role-playing adventure for Tales from the Floating Vagabond published by Avalon Hill.

== Plot summary ==
The Cosmic Paternity Suit is an adventure in which Zeus recruits the player characters to find his son Testosticles.

== Reception ==
Steve Crow reviewed The Cosmic Paternity Suit in White Wolf #38 (1993), rating it a 3 out of 5 and stated that "Overall, I recommend Cosmic Paternity Suit. Beyond its linear tendencies, it is an excellent addition to the line."
