= The Reich Stuff =

The Reich Stuff is a 1991 role-playing adventure for Tales from the Floating Vagabond published by Avalon Hill.

== Contents ==
The Reich Stuff is an adventure in which the player characters use time travel to stop the Nazi plot to build a space platform and take over the world in 1936.

== Reception ==
Steve Crow reviewed The Reich Stuff in White Wolf #32 (July/Aug., 1992), rating it a 1 out of 5 and stated that "Why isn't Reich Stuff funny? I'm not sure. The adventure takes place primarily on Earth, which negates any argument about why Avalon Hill should stick to humor its audience can relate to."
