= Storm King's Thunder =

Tabletop role-playing game adventure

- Rules required: Dungeons & Dragons, 5th edition
- Character levels: 1-11
- Campaign setting: Forgotten Realms
- First published: September 6, 2016
- ISBN: 978-0786966004

Storm King's Thunder is an adventure module for the 5th edition of the Dungeons & Dragons fantasy role-playing game.

== Plot summary ==
Storm King Hekaton is "mysteriously absent from the Forgotten Realms, leaving the Giant races he usually holds in check free to unleash an invasion across the realm. With Frost Giants raiding the Sword Coast, the cities of the Cloud Giants appearing above Baldur's Gate, and Fire Giants assaulting the deserts, the small folk of Faerûn have to band together before they're all crushed beneath the heel of the Giant races... both figuratively and literally". This adventure module is designed to take player characters from 1st level to 11th level.

The table of contents lists the follow sections:

- Introduction
- Chapter 1: A Great Upheaval
- Chapter 2: Rumblings
- Chapter 3: The Savage Frontier
- Chapter 4: The Chosen Path
- Chapter 5: Den of the Hill Giants
- Chapter 6: Canyon of the Stone Giants
- Chapter 7: Berg of the Frost Giants
- Chapter 8: Forge of the Fire Giants
- Chapter 9: Castle of the Cloud Giants
- Chapter 10: Hold of the Storm Giants
- Chapter 11: Caught in the Tentacles
- Chapter 12: Doom of the Desert
- Appendix A: Linked Adventures
- Appendix B: Magic Items
- Appendix C: Creatures
- Appendix D: Special NPCs
- Figures
- Maps

== Publication history ==
Storm King's Thunder was released on September 6, 2016, as a 256-page hardcover book. It was also released as a digital product through the Wizards of the Coast licensees D&D Beyond, Fantasy Grounds, and Roll20. Storm King's Thunder was the second official 5th edition adventure module to be released on Roll20.

On the development of Storm King's Thunder, Chris Perkins, Lead Designer of the book, said "in the case of the Giant's story, for 5th edition, we found an ancient lore from an old book called Giant Craft. This idea of an Ordning, it's sort of like the structure of Giant society. In the Storm King's Thunder, the basic story is, well, what happens if that Ordning is shattered? The Giants basically have to go out into the world and earn the respect and favor of their Gods to create a whole new Ordning, and what that does to the small folk of the world, when the Giants are stomping around doing all kinds of bad stuff".

Jeremy Crawford, Dungeons & Dragons Lead Rules Developer, noted that Storm King's Thunder continued the trend of including queer characters in 5th edition products. Crawford highlighted the Osstra family ("52-year-old wheat farmer Thelbin Osstra, his husband Brynn, and Brynn's adopted nephew Broland") in Nightstone and said "that was a nod specifically to our household. [...] Although the two men are older than my husband and I are".

== Related products ==
WizKids, a Wizards of the Coast licensee, released 45 miniatures that correspond with the adventure in September 2016.

The 10th expansion of the Neverwinter video game aligned the free-to-play massively multiplayer online role-playing game with the Storm King's Thunder storyline including a new campaign, a new dungeon and three new zones.

In 2017, IDW Publishing released a five-issue mini-series comic called Frost Giant's Fury. The tie-in comic centered on a group of heroes from Baldur's Gate and was written by Jim Zub with art by Netho Diaz.

== Reception ==
In Publishers Weekly's "Best-selling Books Week Ending September 19, 2016", Storm King's Thunder was #21 in "Hardcover Nonfiction" and sold 3,857 units. Storm King's Thunder was included in The A.V. Club's 2016 Gift Guide.

Alex Springer, for SLUG Magazine, wrote "where most campaigns tend to begin in some kind of neutral, relatively safe location, Storm King's Thunder thrusts our intrepid adventurers into a recently sieged village that is being picked apart by goblins. [...] Allowing the players to shift gears and take the role of a relatively normal person in the middle of a city-wide attack lets players experience the fantastic world of Dungeons & Dragons from the eyes of a civilian. In a game that expects its players to become superheroes, it was a nice dose of reality to see what it's like to face a supernatural being without the benefit of supernatural powers. As we continued through the campaign, I was impressed at how well Storm King's Thunder balanced structure with improvisational freedom. [...] We're not talking about generic “go fetch” missions or cleansing ruin after ruin of its monstrous occupants, either—one chance encounter finds the players manipulating a lovesick hill giant into betraying her husband-stealing queen. Based on my experience running Storm King's Thunder as a novice DM, I continue to be impressed with the quality of work that Wizards of the Coast puts into their roleplaying game peripherals. The art is fantastic, the maps are meticulous and all of it is set against a Shakespearean story of corruption, betrayal and power".

Cameron Kunzelman, for Paste, wrote "reading through Storm King's Thunder for the first time gave me the strongest itch that I have ever had to actually put a party through a pre-created adventure. The adventure is created in such a way that any given location contains a dozen plot hooks, interesting characters, and beautiful descriptions that would be suitable for an entire campaign. [...] It's hard to be specific here without stealing some of the wonder, but let me tell you about some of the things I found to be the most wonderful in Storm King's Thunder. There's a 40,000+ year old kraken wizard who hangs out in the ocean using its telekinetic powers to lure people into its service from hundreds of miles away. There's a fire giant who wants to reassemble a magical Voltron to punch dragons in the mouth with. [...] Of course, there are parts I don't enjoy as much. Storm King's Thunder is very equitable when it comes to gender, with many giant lords being women and the gender assignment of many NPCs being up to DM discretion. However, that macro plot I mentioned before starts off with [an] old-fashioned fridging of King Hekton's wife Queen Neri, and it's such a conspicuous, trope-y stumble that I initially assumed that it was meant to be commentary of some kind (as far as I can tell, though, it's just a plot point)".

Cecilia D'Anastasio, for Kotaku in a review comparing Out of the Abyss and Storm King's Thunder, wrote "after a few pages of lore and history about the giants of the Forgotten Realms, Chapter One starts players in a deserted settlement infested with goblins. [...] The only real hook into Storm King's Thunder's opening moments is the bell ringing from the bell tower, where goblins are gleefully swinging on a rope. There it was: the easy opening. Go to the bell tower. Explore the town. [...] Players got a strong sense of each others' characters by exploring the empty settlement. It's just a start, but the simplicity of Storm King's Thunder's first chapter made it fun. The experience of it wasn't prescribed, and players weren't made servile by ten NPCs, four hanging towers and thirteen fungi. Later on, when shit gets real in the Savage Frontier, I welcome the new Dungeons & Dragons adventure to throw what it's got at us. The first chapter isn't the time for that. The lack of content in the intro to Storm King's Thunder, for some, was also paralyzing. [...] But I'd rather players meet the challenge of creativity than suffocate in the embrace of a too-meaty adventure. At least we're picking up the game again".

James Haeck, for Geek & Sundry, wrote "before we can see why Roll20 does Storm King's Thunder so well, let's talk about the adventure itself. Storm King's Thunder is technically a sequel to 5e's first story arc, Tyranny of Dragons, in the way that Captain America: Civil War is a sequel to Age of Ultron. You don't need to have played or even read Tyranny to “get” this adventure, but you'll enjoy some easter eggs. This adventure is also shorter than the others. [...] I still prefer the tactile sensation of flipping pages [...] but Roll20's GM tools are startlingly useful. I love showing my players images from the adventure, for instance. All of the illustrations that you'd find in the book are loaded into Roll20's image database, and it's much easier to just click a “share with everyone” button than to awkwardly turn the hardcover around, try (and fail) to cover the spoilery text, and probably break the book's binding in the process. The interactive Table of Contents makes flipping through Roll20's format infinitely easier than leafing through a print book. It's even easier than using a PDF with a hyperlinked Table of Contents, since you can always pop it open from the right-hand sidebar without closing your other open windows. A small negative; the adventure frequently mentions Player's Handbook or Dungeon Master's Guide, not by page number, but by chapter number. And since they can't hyperlink to those books, it's a small grievance, but one with cascading effects".
