= Bigby Presents: Glory of the Giants =

Dungeons & Dragons fantasy role-playing game source book

- Rules required: Dungeons & Dragons, 5th edition
- First published: August 15, 2023
- ISBN: 9780786968985

Bigby Presents: Glory of the Giants is sourcebook that focuses on giants in the 5th edition of the Dungeons & Dragons fantasy role-playing game. The book adds giant themed options for players and Dungeon Masters and contains in-character marginalia by the wizard Bigby of the Greyhawk setting.

== Reception ==
Publishers Weekly listed Bigby Presents: Glory of the Giants as number six of its hardcover nonfiction list in its first week; it had sold 4,929 units.

A review for Screen Rant praised the monsters, including high level challenges, and magic items, as well as roleplaying information related to giants. It criticized that it was not clear how character options were useful if combined with regular gaming options.

A review for Wargamer noted that the sourcebook features artificial intelligence visual art and that Wizards of the Coast had apologized for this use. The review praised the variety of options for the Dungeon Master, including the number of monsters and options for high level play. However, it criticized the low amount of character options compared to Fizban's Treasury of Dragons and noted its limited appeal for low level playing.
