= Mad Monkey vs. the Dragon Claw =

Dungeons & Dragons adventure module

Mad Monkey vs the Dragon Claw
- The cover to Mad Monkey vs the Dragon Claw
- Code: OA5
- Rules required: AD&D (1st Edition)
- Campaign setting: Kara-Tur
- First published: 1988

Linked modules
- OA1 OA2 OA3 OA4 OA5 OA6 OA7

Mad Monkey vs. the Dragon Claw is an adventure module published in 1988 for the Dungeons & Dragons fantasy role-playing game.

== Plot summary ==
Mad Monkey vs. the Dragon Claw is an Oriental Adventures adventure scenario in which the player characters seek the Dragon Claw martial arts school and journey through T'u Lung to the Cult of the Black Leopard.

In this first edition Oriental Adventures module, a group of player characters return to large quest-based adventures. This was the only adventure published for Oriental Adventures based entirely on Kara Tur's mainland, and one of the few modules that actually allows characters to multiclass who would not otherwise be able to do so.

=== Background ===
The background story is that the demon Dragon Claw, in the celestial bureaucracy, has convinced the Celestial Emperor to allow him to showcase his fighting style on Toril. It contends that its style is superior to all other forms, and if this turns out to be the case, it wants to rule an empire on the prime material plane. The Celestial Emperor has agreed, if only to see out the demons boast of its fighting style.

Dragon Claw has neglected to mention that its fighting style includes it giving all of its students magical weapons which, aside from making them fanatical devotees to its fighting style, also make them much tougher than an average fighter. In this way, Dragon Claw is stacking the deck in its favor.

Monkey, an agent among the court, has seen through the demon's plot, and is determined to thwart it. Monkey chooses to teach his own fighting style to the player characters, owing to them being able to multiclass freely as monks, though they normally are able to. All this leads up to the final battle in Toril's version of Sigil.

== Publication history ==
OA5 Mad Monkey vs. The Dragon Claw was written by Jeff Grubb, with a cover by Jim Holloway, and was published by TSR in 1988 as a 48-page booklet with an outer folder.
