= Giantcraft =

Role-playing game supplement

- Genre: Role-playing game
- Publisher: TSR
- Media type: Print

Giantcraft is a supplement to the 2nd edition of the Advanced Dungeons & Dragons fantasy role-playing game.

== Contents ==
Giantcraft is a sourcebook for the Forgotten Realms campaign setting focusing on giants.

== Publication history ==
Shannon Appelcline commented that of the changes to the Forgotten Realms publications in the early 1990s, "The biggest change was that the geographical setting books had faded away starting in the early '90s. They were replaced by a number of other lines. The "FOR" books instead looked at organization in the Realms — much like the splatbooks of White Wolf and others. They ran from FOR1: Draconomicon (1990) to Giantcraft (1995)."

== Reception ==
Andy Butcher reviewed Giantcraft for Arcane magazine, rating it a 5 out of 10 overall. He suggests that if the players are bored by giants and no longer find them interesting, "then Giantcraft should be allowed to permeate your gameworld. It offers a refreshingly different perspective on giants." He continues, "These are not the two-dimensional, high hit-dice end-of-campaign bosses we've grown accustomed to. They are fully fleshed-out stars. And not only does the Giantcraft supplement slip seamlessly into Forgotten Realms, but also it requires only minimal tweaking to transport all the bits you want to any AD&D universe." Butcher does criticize that "Giantcraft lacks cohesion and direction. Sure you're told a lot, but you're told the same lot repeatedly. Some sections are plain laughable ... while others, such as the chapter on giant-kin, are plain tedious." He credits the book that "Almost by accident, though, Giantcraft does manage though to reinvent one of AD&D's less glamorous creatures with a liberal sprinkling of great ideas, anecdotal character descriptions and veiled hints". Butcher ends the review by saying "The lack of focus and repetitive nature force Giantcraft from the 'must read' list but next time you want an inspiration hit, you should find it here."
