= The Great Glacier =

1992 tabletop role-playing game supplement

- Genre: Role-playing games
- Publisher: TSR
- Publication date: 1992

The Great Glacier is an accessory for the 2nd edition of the Advanced Dungeons & Dragons fantasy role-playing game, published in 1992.

== Contents ==
The module describes "a bitterly cold wilderness of ice and snow", and outlines the conditions characters experience in this type of environment. The product describes the cultures of the three tribes, together called the "Ulutiun", or the people of the Great Glacier. These hardy people "live in scattered small villages", the largest of which is only 1,500 strong.

According to John Setzer

The components of this product include a 96-page booklet and a map of the standard [Forgotten Realms] type with a scale of 1 inch = 30 miles, allowing it to fit with other maps in the Forgotten Realms series. Printed on the cover folder is a short but useful list of Ulutiun terms. Some of these are real tongue twisters: can you say “Innugaakalikurit”?

== Publication history ==
The Great Glacier was written by Rick Swan and published by TSR.

== Reception ==
John Setzer reviewed the module in a 1993 issue of White Wolf Magazine. He stated that the product met Forgotten Realms standards, and was a good product, but didn't rise to the level of greatness. Overall, he rated the module 4 out of a possible 5.
