= Ochimo: The Spirit Warrior =

Dungeons & Dragons adventure module

- Code: OA3
- Authors: Jeff Grubb
- First published: 1987

Linked modules
- OA1 OA2 OA3 OA4 OA5 OA6 OA7

Ochimo: The Spirit Warrior is an adventure module published in 1987 for the Advanced Dungeons & Dragons fantasy role-playing game.

== Plot summary ==
Ochimo the Spirit Warrior is an adventure scenario for the original Oriental Adventures in which the player characters travel to Akari Island to fight against the spirit of a warrior from ancient times.

Ochimo, the Spirit Warrior includes a timeline for an important portion of the world presented in Oriental Adventures, and features a scenario set on an island that presents aspects of the culture of the mainland.

== Publication history ==
OA3 Ochimo the Spirit Warrior was written by Jeff Grubb, with a cover by Jeff Easley and interior illustrations by Jim Holloway, and was published by TSR in 1987 as a 48-page booklet with an outer folder.

== Reception ==
Michael Mullen reviewed the adventure in Space Gamer/Fantasy Gamer No. 81, and concluded that "Ochimo, the Spirit Warrior serves as a moderate introduction to the more Chinese elements of the world" while providing a background timeline for the major civilization of the mainland. He noted that while the adventure is intended to be used for characters of level 5-7, with seven pre-rolled characters included, "you may find that the players should bring characters towards the upper end of that scale, or maybe even levels 7-9. The players face some major opposition, and well played, there should be few characters left standing at the end of the adventure."
