= Swords of the Daimyo =

Dungeons & Dragons adventure module

- Code: OA1
- Authors: David "Zeb" Cook with Kelley Foote
- First published: 1986

Linked modules
- OA1 OA2 OA3 OA4 OA5 OA6 OA7

Swords of the Daimyo is a 1986 adventure module for the Oriental Adventures rules of the Advanced Dungeons & Dragons fantasy role-playing game.

== Contents ==
Swords of the Daimyo contains three adventures. The first adventure is for player characters (PCs) levels 6–10, and takes Western AD&D characters on a sea voyage to Kozakura (the Oriental Adventures version of Japan). The adventure includes a system for calculating the chances of a crew mutiny. When the player characters arrive in Kozakura, the module states that "it is likely that one or more will be permanently slain", with the intention of replacing said characters with new characters native to the setting. The other two adventures in the module are designed for Oriental Adventures characters, and revolve around the wicked activities of the militant sohei of the Black Temple. One of these adventures involves defending of a village from bandits, and the other involves defeating the bandit organizer. These two adventures form a linked package, separated by time and a few character levels.

This campaign and adventure pack provides an overview of the politics and climate of the lands of Kozakura. After a brief overview of Kozakura, the pack focuses on the province of Miayama, and its government, samurai families, temples and landholdings. The package also includes a list of names and maps of various residences found in the province.

Swords of the Daimyo provides the continent map of the world presented in the original Oriental Adventures, and details a full province with a background included for one of the five most significant divisions in the world.

== Publication history ==
OA1 Swords of the Daimyo was written by David "Zeb" Cook with Kelley Foote and published by TSR in 1986, and included a thirty two page gazetteer called Province Book of Miyama and a thirty two page "Adventure Book", with a large color map and an outer folder. The module featured cover and interior art by Jeff Easley. It is the first adventure that was intended to be used for the Oriental Adventures rules. The Province book details the continent of Kara-Tur, including the province of Miyama as well as the island of Kozakura. The module includes a historical timeline of Kozakura, as well as statistics for new monsters.

== Reception ==
Ashley Shepherd reviewed Swords of the Daimyo for White Dwarf No. 80, and felt that the module provides more than enough material to run an Oriental Adventures campaign, and could easily be reworked for the Bushido role-playing game. Shepherd compared the sea voyage adventure to the novel Shōgun, and suggested that dungeon masters (DMs) should borrow the crew mutiny system for sea adventures. He noted that several of the possible encounters in the adventure are too deadly for 6th level characters, and felt that the other two adventures were fine, although the link between them was nearly non-existent. Shepherd said the "real strength" of the module was the background material given in the Province Book of Miyama, forming a comprehensive location a DM can use as "a good starting point for any number of adventures". Shepherd also liked the random encounters system. Although he felt that there were weak points, such as the maps not being up to standard, the small number of adventures, and the frustration caused by their slightly disjointed nature, Shepherd concluded that Swords of the Diamyo was "a good module package". The module won a Gamer's Choice award.

Michael Mullen reviewed the adventure in Space Gamer/Fantasy Gamer No. 81. He felt that the module is necessary to running the campaign of the world presented in the original Oriental Adventures, and that the module "is worth looking at also for the method of approach to detailing a province". Mullen concluded that "The initial module, Swords of the Daimyo provides a large province and several other worth while items for the DM, and three loosely connected mini-adventures. The first is a means of getting a set of traditional characters to the new area of their world. The second is a raid on a peasant village (shades of the Seven Samurai) although there is some confusion as to how many bad guys are doing the raiding. The third adventure is for the characters when they gain more experience, presumably by exploring the rest of the province. [...] This gives the party a chance to avenge the village humiliated in the second adventure and explore a temple at the same time."

Jim Bambra reviewed Swords of the Daimyo for Dragon magazine No. 134 in June 1988. Bambra likened Kozakura to a fantasy version of feudal Japan, stating that it closely resembles "the war-torn period of Japanese history between the Kamakura and Sengoku periods, when rival daimyos engaged in bloody struggles for power".
