= Night of the Seven Swords =

Dungeons & Dragons adventure module

- Code: OA2
- Authors: Jon Pickens, David “Zeb” Cook, Harold Johnson, Rick Swan, Ed Carmien, and David James Ritchie
- First published: 1986

Linked modules
- OA1 OA2 OA3 OA4 OA5 OA6 OA7

Night of the Seven Swords is a 1986 adventure module for the Oriental Adventures rules of the Advanced Dungeons & Dragons fantasy role-playing game.

== Plot summary ==
Night of the Seven Swords includes four connected adventure scenarios in which the player characters must enter a haunted castle to recover several relics from the castle, but the forces of Lord Korimori try to stop their efforts.

Night of the Seven Swords is an adventure which focuses on a rivalry involving two clans, as well as a haunted castle, and a box containing relics. The player characters have an encounter in which they are required to behave honorably, and then can then explore the haunted castle of Ito-Jo. After retrieving their objective from the castle, the characters must deliver it, while avoiding getting caught up in the machinations of rival to their lord.

Night of the Seven Swords provides information for another province set in the world presented in the original Oriental Adventures.

== Publication history ==
OA2 Night of the Seven Swords was published by TSR in 1986 as a 48-page booklet with an outer folder. The module was written by Jon Pickens, David “Zeb” Cook, Harold Johnson, Rick Swan, Ed Carmien, and David James Ritchie, with cover art drawn by Clyde Caldwell and interior art by James Holloway.

OA2 Night of the Seven Swords was the second adventure produced for use with Oriental Adventures and is recommend for a party of 6–8 player characters of level 4–6. The module comes in the form of a 48-page booklet with a wraparound cover in three parts that can be used as a Dungeon Master's (DM) screen. The inside cover shows the plans to the castle Ito-Jo, presented in the "exploded view" previously used in the Dungeoneer's Survival Guide. The cover also has a conventional groundplan of the dungeon area underneath the castle, and the plans for an inn which is featured in the adventure. The outside of the cover presents a full-color map of Maeshi Province, visible to the players when the cover is used as a DM's screen. The booklet begins by presenting a 3-page section with background information that details the Maeshi province geography and history, followed by information for the DM and notes on how to set up the adventure.

== Reception ==
Graeme Davis reviewed Night of the Seven Swords for White Dwarf #86. Davis found the plot interesting and believable, although he was initially concerned that the main part of the adventure in the haunted castle was just another standard dungeon bash. However, he concluded that "it's a very good haunted castle, and even those who don't normally enjoy dungeon bashes will probably find it interesting and enjoyable. There are some interestingly Oriental bits and pieces which maintain the atmosphere nicely". He felt that some of the encounters were tough for the suggested party strength, although he suggested that a reasonable number of spellcasters should help to cope with that. He felt that it would have been nice to have a poster-size map of Maeshi Province, but found that the two main settings of the castle and the inn would make useful stock locations for OA. Davis concluded that the adventure is "an interesting and well-balanced mixture of role-playing and fighting". He considered having OA2 and OA1 in different provinces to be a drawback, although he figured that a DM wanting to link the two adventures in a campaign should be able to tweak the setting and history with a little work. He noted that Bushido referees could do some conversion work to fit the scenario into that game. Davis concluded the review by stating, "Overall, it's a nice adventure, with the Oriental Adventures rules used to good effect throughout."

Michael Mullen reviewed the adventure in Space Gamer/Fantasy Gamer No. 81. He commented that the module "gives a nifty 'haunted house' adventure". Mullen concluded that "Night of the Seven Swords adds a province although it is not as filled with details as the one in [Swords of the Daimyo]. The territory is more isolated and less populated, however. The main story of this module, recovering a relic from a haunted castle, is well constructed and the adventure is challenging. There is a real nasty new monster here, too."
