= A Dozen and One Adventures =

Tabletop role-playing game supplement

- Genre: Role-playing game
- Publisher: TSR
- Publication date: 1993
- Media type: Boxed set

A Dozen and One Adventures is an accessory for the 2nd edition of the Advanced Dungeons & Dragons fantasy tabletop role-playing game, published in 1993.

== Contents ==
A Dozen and One Adventures includes thirteen short adventures, featuring weird bathhouses, deceptive ghouls, amorous succubi, passionate genies, raucous merriment with desert riders, the sacred salt bond between host and guest, a boasting contest, a mummified talking head in the Hall of Lost Kings, Greek fire, a deranged fire mage, and the Brotherhood of True Flame. The adventures start with beginning characters, and the finale finishes with characters of levels 9-12. Reviewer Gene Alloway found it very compatible with the Golden Voyages.

== Publication history ==
A Dozen and One Adventures was designed by Steven Kurtz.

== Reception ==
Allen Varney reviewed A Dozen and One Adventures for Dragon magazine #219 (July 1995). He declares, "Now this is the stuff of Arabian adventure", and notes that "a lot of fire burns through the last half of these thirteen short adventures, despite one late episode in an inundated sand castle". Varney concludes with this assessment: "Starting with beginning characters, the Dozen and One Adventures develop a more-or-less continuous narrative up through the finale, for levels 9-12. Here the PCs become pawns, and occasionally onlookers, in a deadly struggle among the fire mage, the Soft Whisper assassins, a Leper King, and other high-power factions. Still, Kurtz (who has read all the Arabian Nights tales — "including the supplements!" he says, as if incredulous at his masochism) has summoned the flavor of the genre with impressive skill."

Gene Alloway reviewed the module in a 1994 issue of White Wolf. He rated the game at 2 of 5 for Complexity, a 4 for Appearance, Concepts, and Value, and a 5 for Playability. He stated it was an "excellent supplement" and gave it an overall rating of 4.
