= Sha'ir =

A sha'ir (Arabic: شاعر, romanized: shāʿir) was a pre-Islamic Arab poet believed to have magical powers.

== History ==
The origin of the term sha'ir is unknown. The ancient Arab culture viewed the sha'ir as a type of wizard, able to commune with supernatural forces, or djinni, for both knowledge and power. Members of the tribe treated sha'ir as oracles and wisemen. The poems and songs of the sha'ir inspired tribe members during war, and were considered powerful weapons.

Many thought sha'ir could supernaturally communicate with the djinn and the results were beautiful poetry inspired by the mystical being.

== Modern adaptation ==
In the Dungeons & Dragons fantasy role-playing game, a type of kit, or variation on a character class, called the sha'ir was created for the Al-Qadim campaign setting. In the game, however, sha'ir have actual magical powers, and can communicate with genies. In addition to being advisors, sha'ir can also be found wandering alone in the desert, something the real sha'ir were not known for.
