= Cities of Bone =

- Genre: Role-playing games
- Publisher: TSR
- Publication date: 1994
- Media type: Boxed set

Cities of Bone is an accessory for the 2nd edition of the Advanced Dungeons & Dragons fantasy role-playing game, published in 1994.

== Contents ==
Cities of Bone is an Al-Qadim boxed set that includes six dungeon crawls, mostly portable anywhere in Zakhara, half for beginning characters and the rest for mid-to high levels. The text offers advice for creating a spooky atmosphere, and the historical reasons behind the construction of each dungeon.

Half the text makes up the adventure, "Court of the Necromancers", where in the undead city of Ysawis, the player characters get involved in the intrigues of a couple of repugnant wizards and a senile lich.

== Publication history ==
Cities of Bone was written by Steve Kurtz.

== Reception ==
Allen Varney reviewed Cities of Bone for Dragon magazine #219 (July 1995). He comments: "The indefatigable Kurtz returns with another mixed lot of adventures in ruined cities. The Al-Qadim line had been held over a year beyond its original plan by the time of this 1994 sourcebox, and this may explain the set's flagging inspiration." He calls the dungeon crawls "mostly routine" and says that the historical reasons for each dungeon "make interesting reading, but these are basically numbered rooms with traps and monsters. These are endlessly popular in other AD&D worlds, but in Zakhara they fit awkwardly, for (as the text remarks) 'robbing the tombs of enlightened creatures is considered a base and dishonorable profession.'" Varney considers "Court of the Necromancers" to be the set's best adventure, commenting: "There's an interesting plot and one well-staged, creepy dinner scene with the two necromancers, but the storyline works only with players who behave with cautious restraint — yet the same adventure's dungeon crawl, like all the others here, belongs to the kill-everything-that-moves school of adventure design. It's an unfortunate mix."
