= Ronin Challenge =

Dungeons & Dragons adventure module

- Code: OA6
- Authors: Curtis Smith and Rick Swan
- First published: 1990

Linked modules
- OA1 OA2 OA3 OA4 OA5 OA6 OA7

Ronin Challenge is an adventure module published in 1990 for the Advanced Dungeons & Dragons fantasy role-playing game.

== Plot summary ==
Ronin Challenge is a Kara-Tur adventure scenario in which the player characters attend a martial arts tournament before journeying into hazardous wilderness and ancient ruins.

== Publication history ==
OA6 Ronin Challenge was written by Curtis Smith and Rick Swan, with a cover by Jim Holloway, and was published by TSR in 1990 as an 80-page booklet with a large color map and an outer folder.

== Reviews ==
- GamesMaster International (Issue 5 - Dec 1990)
