= The Forgotten Realms Atlas =

1990 book by Karen Wynn Fonstad

- Author: Karen Wynn Fonstad
- Genre: Role-playing game
- Publisher: TSR
- Publication date: 1990
- Pages: 192
- ISBN: 0-88038-857-9

The Forgotten Realms Atlas is a book produced by Karen Wynn Fonstad and provides detailed maps of the Forgotten Realms, a fictional setting for the Dungeons & Dragons fantasy role-playing game.

The atlas also includes timelines of various novels set in the world. The book is 210 pages, and was published in August 1990.

== Contents ==
The Forgotten Realms Atlas is an indexed book which contains three-color maps of the Forgotten Realms. This includes large, small scale regional maps (one inch to two hundred miles), as well as detailed location maps and diagrams of areas including the Moonshae Isles, the Northwest lands near Waterdeep, and the Western Heartlands areas around Cormyr and the Dalelands. These large scale maps cover the areas detailed in Forgotten Realms game modules and novels that had been published before the Atlas.

The Forgotten Realms Atlas has many maps covering the Forgotten Realms, including regions in Pool of Radiance. It is out of print and is prized by collectors.

== Publication history ==
The Forgotten Realms Atlas was designed by Karen Wynn Fonstad and published in 1990 as a 192-page book.

== Reception ==
Lawrence Schick, in his 1991 book Heroic Worlds, calls the book a "very pretty, exhaustive sourcebook".
