= Jim Holloway (artist) =

American fantasy/science fiction artist

1st edition of MechWarrior, 1986, Jim Holloway

James Holloway (died June 28, 2020) was an American artist of fantasy and science fiction illustrations whose work appeared in role-playing games, on the cover of Dragon, and on the covers of board wargames.

== Background ==
Jim Holloway was self taught in illustration, although he was able to study some oil paintings by his father.

== Works ==
Jim Holloway produced interior illustrations for many Dungeons & Dragons books and Dragon magazine starting in 1981, as well as cover art for The Land Beyond the Magic Mirror and Dungeonland (1983), and Mad Monkey vs. the Dragon Claw (1988), the Spelljammer: AD&D Adventures in Space boxed set (1989), and Ronin Challenge (1990).

Holloway was the original artist for the Paranoia role-playing game, the first edition of MechWarrior (1986), and also did the cover for Tales from the Floating Vagabond from Avalon Hill. He also created artwork for many products from FASA's BattleTech game line (BattleTech, CityTech, AeroTech, etc.). He produced artwork for many other games including Chill (Pacesetter Ltd) and Sovereign Stone (Sovereign Press). He also created the opening and closing animation sequences for the video game Beyond Shadowgate.

He worked with actress/models such as Brinke Stevens and Crystal Gonzales.

== Personal life ==
On June 28, 2020, on Holloway's Facebook group page "The Art of Jim Holloway", Holloway's son posted a notice that he had died that day.

== Legacy ==
- In 2014, Scott Taylor of Black Gate, named Jim Holloway as #6 in a list of The Top 10 RPG Artists of the Past 40 Years, saying "To me, his ability to bring a homespun gaming humor to his work often outweighs the serious quality he can also show us, like his battle scenes, but there is no doubt after looking at his resume just how important Jim has been to the genre for the past thirty years."
- Meaghan Colleran, writing for The Bell of Lost Souls, described Holloway as having "an art style that was adaptive, fun, and full of detail. His art was able to convey humor and tenseness at the same time, creating perfect illustrated representations of playing these games." She noted that Holloway's work "spanned a wide range of genres, from high fantasy to science fiction to horror, always capturing the perfect mood with the most expressive characters."
- Ray Arrastia, a BattleTech line developer, recalled "Jim Holloway was one of the earliest contributors to the BattleTech, and his vision defined so much of what drew myself and so many others to the universe. His paintings and illustrations remain in my mind to this day, and they still inform the creative direction of the BattleTech Universe."
