= Abeir-Toril =

Forgotten Realms fictional planet

Toril (formerly Abeir-Toril) is the fictional planet that makes up the Forgotten Realms Dungeons & Dragons campaign setting, as well as the Al-Qadim and Maztica campaign settings, and the 1st edition version of the Oriental Adventures campaign setting. It is the default world for the 5th edition of Dungeons & Dragons.

The name means "cradle of life" in an archaic fictional language of the setting. It consists of various continents and islands, including Faerûn, Kara-Tur, Zakhara, Maztica, Osse, Anchorome and Katashaka, a sub-Saharan-like continent south of Maztica, where humanity appeared. Toril was originally the name of game designer Jeff Grubb's personal campaign world before part of it was merged with creator Ed Greenwood's Forgotten Realms setting.

== Publishing history ==
Toril was the name of Jeff Grubb's campaign world, and was adopted as the name of the planet upon which the continent of Faerûn existed when he and Ed Greenwood were designing the original Forgotten Realms Boxed Set in 1987. Greenwood had written tales for his world "as far back as 1967" and "it had been the setting for his homespun D&D campaigns since 1978". Abeir- was added as a prefix to the planet's name so that it would be the first entry in the alphabetical encyclopedia of terms included in the set.

The setting's entire planet underwent a major change during the 1989 Avatar trilogy, which detailed a series of events called the Time of Troubles, during which gods walked the earth and magic became unpredictable. These events caused permanent changes in gameplay that were outlined in the Advanced Dungeons & Dragons 2nd edition campaign setting books. In this edition, Abeir-Toril was considered one of D&D's three main worlds, along with Krynn and Oerth.

In a significant retcon of the setting's history, Forgotten Realms material for the fourth edition of Dungeons & Dragons "reveals" that the world was split in two in prehistory, divided between the primordials (Abeir) and the gods (Toril). Toril is the world that has been showcased so far. A cataclysm called the Spellplague has caused several parts of the two worlds to switch places, displacing portions of Faerûn and the entire continent of Maztica, with regions of Abeir: Tymanther, Akanûl, and Returned Abeir. A subsequent event called "The Sundering" reverted many of these changes and restored much of the pre-Spellplague Toril.

== Fictional continents ==
=== Anchorome ===
Anchorome is almost unexplored and is at the North of Maztica. Its best-known inhabitants are the Azuposi, as well as the defunct Esh Alakarans and the xenophobic Poscadar elves. There is also a sahuagin realm called Itzcali located in the sea nearby.

The character Balduran, a sea captain and founder of Baldur's Gate, sails to Anchorome and returns with a great wealth which is used to build the wall around the fledgling Baldur's Gate. In the Baldur's Gate: Tales of the Sword Coast expansion, it is revealed that Balduran returns to Anchorome and retrieves a second hoard of treasure from the Native kingdoms. When he attempts to take on a number of locals to replenish his crew, he discovers they are infected with lycanthropy. The resulting battle shipwrecks Balduran on an island, which is later discovered by a Merchant Guild from Baldur's Gate and subsequently by the player who is sent to confirm the finding, where both the original crews' and the natives from Anchorome's descendants are locked in a bloody lycanthrope feud. The fate of Balduran himself is never clearly revealed.

After the discovery of Maztica by the mercenary captain Cordell, mercenaries from the Flaming Fist are sent to Anchorome. They build a keep, Fort Flame, in the shores of Balduran's bay (which is actually far below Balduran's resting place) but other than this it has been a complete disaster.

It is speculated that it is the land where the Creator Race known as the Aearee retreated a long time ago. It is rumored that several tribes of thri-kreen make their home in Anchorome's western regions.

=== Faerûn ===
The continent of Faerûn is the primary setting of the Forgotten Realms and the part of Toril most detailed in stories and supplements.

=== Kara-Tur ===
Kara-Tur's cultures and peoples are fantasy analogues of medieval regions of East Asia, including China, Korea, Japan, the Ryukyu Islands, Tibet, and others. According to Jim Bambra, "while primarily drawing on Japan for inspiration, [Kara-Tur] also contains elements of medieval China and Korea". Kara-Tur was first described in the original 1985 Oriental Adventures book. A reviewer for White Dwarf called the long background section of Kara-Tur in the book, a "bonus". Originally intended as a western part of the continent of Oerik in the Greyhawk setting, the description of Kara-Tur in the Oriental Adventures rulebook made no attempt to link it with another D&D game-world. The first map of Kara-Tur appeared in the adventure module OA1: Swords of the Daimyo (1986), where the setting was still world-neutral. The 1987 Forgotten Realms Campaign Set left the eastern half of its continent reserved for the future publication of Kara-Tur. In 1988, TSR released a boxed set, Kara-Tur: The Eastern Realms, describing the region in greater detail, with two 96-page books and maps. In the process of adapting the setting to the Forgotten Realms, the size of the continent was scaled down significantly.

The ten distinct nations and regions described in the boxed set and their real-world analogues include:

- Shou Lung: Imperial China during periods of centralized government
- T'u Lung: Historical China during eras of political disunity, e.g. the Warring States period
- Wa: Feudal Japan (Edo/Kamakura period)
- Kozakura: Japan (Feudal/Sengoku period)
- Northern Wastes: Historical Eastern Siberia
- Tabot: Tibet
- Koryo: Korea
- The Island Kingdoms: Pre-colonial civilizations of Indonesia and the Philippines.
- The Plain of Horses: Historical Mongolia. This region is the Kara-Tur portion of the Hordelands, also known as the Endless Wastes.
- The Jungle Lands of Malatra: Pre-colonial civilizations of Indochina (historical versions of the Khmer Empire and Vietnam) as well as the hill tribes inspired by their real-life Southeast Asian counterparts.

In 1989 a printing of Trail Maps for Kara-Tur appeared as part of Advanced Dungeons & Dragons 2nd edition. In 1990 the maps were again included in The Forgotten Realms Atlas. Later that year TSR converted the monsters of Kara-Tur to second edition Advanced Dungeons & Dragons rules as part of the Monstrous Compendium series. After 1990, TSR ceased publishing new material related to Kara-Tur. The setting was, however, occasionally referred to by other TSR products such as Spelljammer and Ravenloft.

The setting of Kara-Tur still exists on Abeir-Toril in Dungeons & Dragons 3rd edition and is often mentioned in Forgotten Realms supplements. Characters and artifacts from Kara-Tur sometimes show up in Faerûn, but beyond that there is little interaction between the continents. The 2015 release of Sword Coast Adventurer's Guide, a supplement for Dungeons & Dragons 5th edition, introduced Kara-Tur to the fifth edition of Dungeons & Dragons. There is a brief description of the land along with references throughout the book to its culture and how certain classes or backgrounds might fit in there.

Reviewer Michael Mullen, looking at the setting of Kara-Tur before the publication of the boxed set, stated that players would probably like the world, but that it would depend largely on how familiar the DM was with Oriental culture or Japanese movies and television. He remarked that the "usual opposition, if not human, will be from the spirit world", rather than more conventional battles versus monsters. Game studies scholar Aaron Trammell commented that "Although Gary Gygax envisioned a campaign setting that brought a multicultural dimension to Dungeons & Dragons, the reality is that by lumping together Chinese, Japanese, Korean, Mongolian, Philippine, and 'Southeast Asian' lore he and co-authors David 'Zeb' Cook and Francois Marcela-Froideval actually developed a campaign setting that reinforced western culture's already racist understanding of the 'Orient'."

==== Related products set in Kara-Tur ====
===== Modules =====
The Kara-Tur campaign setting inspired the following eight adventure modules (in chronological order):

- OA1, Swords of the Daimyo (1986)
- OA2, Night of the Seven Swords (1986)
- OA3, Ochimo: The Spirit Warrior (1987)
- OA4, Blood of the Yakuza (1987)
- OA5, Mad Monkey vs. the Dragon Claw (1988, zip)
- FROA1, Ninja Wars (1990)
- OA6, Ronin Challenge (1990, zip)
- OA7, Test of the Samurai (1990)

===== Books =====
Three choose your own adventure style books (one was actually released before the original Oriental Adventures book) were published:

- Blade of the Young Samurai – Endless Quest 23 (1984)
- Test of the Ninja – AD&D Adventure Gamebook 5 (1985)
- Warlords – 1 on 1 Book 7 (1986)

One of novels in The Empires Trilogy is set in Shou Lung of Kara-Tur.

- Denning, Troy (1990). Dragonwall. Forgotten Realms: The Empires Trilogy, Book 2. Wizards of the Coast. ISBN 0-88038-919-2. OCLC 22340289.

===== Other =====
- Dragon #315, for information on ancestor feats and martial arts styles specific to the Kara-Tur setting, as well as updated information on the 10 empires and regions of Kara-Tur.

=== Maztica ===
Maztica, called by its inhabitants The True World, is a fictional continent that is a land of jungles and (to the Faerûnians) mystery. The area was heavily inspired by Aztec and Mayan culture.

Early in its fictional history it was a land fought over by the gods Qotal the Plumed Serpent and his brother Zaltec. For a crime against his sister, Qotal retreated from Maztica for an age but returned in recent times.

It was 'discovered' by Amnian explorers led by one Captain-general Cordell and his Golden Legion in 1361 DR. Amn was quick to carve out its claim to the land for trade benefits, establishing the port city of Helmsport, and the church of Helm led the encroachment into the new land. The native peoples were devastated by foreign diseases and the ruthlessness of the invaders, and this, coupled with the difficulties encountered on Maztica backfiring against them, caused the church of Helm to come under heavy criticism. Lantan also claimed some lands.

Maztica is divided into the nations of Nexal, Kultaka, Huacli, Kolan, Pezelac, and Payit. The region known as Far Payit neighbours Payit, both in the east around Helmsport. The native people of Maztica from Payit and Far Payit are known as Payits, whereas natives from the other nations are known as Mazticans. There are also the human races known as the Dog People and the Green Folk. Many monstrous races also live in Maztica, including wild halflings and Chacs—jaguar spirits. In very old times, couatl came from Maztica to fight the Yuan-ti of Chult.

Some scorpionfolk from Maztica found an Underdark passage to the Underdark of Faerûn.

North of Maztica is the continent of Anchorome. South of it (and separated by a strait) lies an unknown continent.

Maztica was detailed for 2nd Edition Dungeons & Dragons in the Maztica Campaign Set by Douglas Niles, and in the Forgotten Realms novels of the Maztica Trilogy—Ironhelm, Viperhand and Feathered Dragon—also by Douglas Niles. It was based on historical Central America.

In a retrospective review in Black Gate, Scott Taylor found Maztica unimpressive because the continent too closely mirrored the Mesoamerican world, down to the history of the Conquistadores, rather than creating a uniquely fantasy version inspired by the "colorful and diverse" reality that is Mesoamerica. CBR author Matthew England considered it "a rarity in the fantasy genre" to base a continent on these cultures.

Maztica was also the name of the elder goddess who embodied the land of Maztica. Killed by her own son Zaltec, she was the wife of dead Kukul, but unlike her husband, continues to live on in the continued existence of the continent.

In 4th edition, the Spellplague caused by Mystra's death caused Abeir and Toril to briefly merge and then instantly rip apart again. As a result, Maztica is no longer a part of Toril, having been replaced with a continent called "Returned Abeir". On some maps, it has been renamed Anchorome.

=== Zakhara ===
Zakhara is a fictional realm styled after the themes and setting depicted in the Arabian Nights. The land is the setting of the Al-Qadim campaign setting for the Dungeons & Dragons tabletop role-playing game. Zakhara is a giant peninsula of the same supercontinent that hosts Faerûn and Kara-Tur on the planet Abeir-Toril. Zakhara is located east of Faerûn, and the closest Faerûnian lands to Zakhara are Dambrath (by sea) and Ulgarth or arguably Konigheim (by land). Zakhara is mostly isolated from the rest of the world, as the peninsula is separated from the main mass by the World Pillar Mountains (also known as Wu Pi Te Shao in Kara-Tur).

The Zakharan pantheon consists of several cultures, like the culture of Enlightenment and more savage deities, such as Ragarra.

Waters around Zakhara are bountiful with pirates and corsairs who charge traders tolls to cross "their" seas, such traders willingly pay these exorbitant fees as Zakhara's exotic trading goods tend to be well worth the price back in Faerûn. Occasionally the pirates decide to completely cut off Zakhara from Faerûn.

The land is full of secretive cities, unwelcoming to travellers, huge deserts, lush oases and powerful genies who meddle in the affairs of humans frequently. The continent is ruled by a theocracy headed by the Grand Caliph, and tales tell of demon-infested cities and godless sorcerers (like the genie-binding Sha'irs) wielding strange magic. Powerful magic and great warriors of every like are to be found in Zakhara.

Zakharans are firmly convinced they are more civilized than the rest of the world and treat "barbarians" accordingly.

The capital city of Zakhara is Huzuz, the "City of Delights".

The setting itself proclaimed to have "much more in common with early Hollywood depictions rather than hard historical fact."

In the view of Myles Balfe, the Fantasy "Orient" of Zakhara has been designed as a new and exotic counter-realm for players to experience, contrasting with more common settings depicted as "a moralized neo-medieval Europe". It is presented "as a chaotic, alien space". In some depictions Balfe sees the Arabic-style cities of the continent connected to erotic ideas of the harem and the "Arabian courtesan", tropes from Orientalist fiction. In his view the ruling Grand Caliph – "the symbolic figurehead of the entire Land of Fate" – is depicted as impotent to protect his own harem, so that he and his land are dependent on western-style heroic characters to save them.

== Other features ==
=== Tears of Selûne ===
The Tears of Selûne are a pack of asteroids trailing Abeir-Toril's moon, Selûne.

=== Wu Pi Te Shao ===
Known as the World Pillar Mountains in Faerûn or Wu Pi Te Shao in Kara-Tur, the "Roof of the World" is the largest mountain range in the fictional fantasy world of Toril. It is inhabited by evil Yak-men and separates Zakhara from the rest of the supercontinent.

=== Yal-Tengri ===
Yal-Tengri (also known as The Great Ice Sea) is Toril's equivalent of the Arctic Ocean. It is barely known at all. In the ancient time, the major city on its shore was Winterkeep; it is now the trade city of Naupau, in Sossal. Far in the north of the sea is a small island dominated by a cathedral-like spire, inhabited by gnomes of Gond.

The Yal-Tengri is free of ice for the six summer months of the year

The Endless Ice Sea is the name of the western Faerûn part of it. Somewhere there is Jhothûn, the long-forgotten capital of a mighty empire of Giants.

== Reception and analysis ==
Philip J. Clements referred to "the world of the highly popular Forgotten Realms series" as "an unusually well-developed D&D setting", which has great variety among its fantasy races. A number of human cultures in different regions take their inspirations from real-world cultures.

Daniel T. Kline summed up Abeir-Toril as a "vast, high-fantasy, neo-medievalist world".

CBR writer Jared King considered the history of the world of Toril "full of deep lore crafted over decades of editions" and found the Dawn War, a conflict involving the gods in the ancient past of the setting, especially fascinating.

In comparison to other D&D worlds, Aidan-Paul Canavan found Toril "more illustrative" and that it "became further codified and developed over time" than the world of Greyhawk, and "militarily more stable and thus may lead to more 'adventure' based missions" compared to the focus on wars within Krynn/Ansalon. In Canavan's view, Toril more closely resembled Robert E. Howard's Hyborian Age, as both are "constructed as a patchwork or mosaic of kingdoms, realms and lands, many borrowing directly from historical settings". Even though "pseudo-medieval European analogues" were predominant, a great variety in environments and cultures could be encountered in the setting. The regions of Toril were given many details and relationships among each other in various game products. As a world designed for role-playing games it has a static character: where main characters in fantasy settings designed for novels could drastically change the world, the descriptions of Toril have to be "re-usable" for various groups of players. There were, however, significant changes made to the world to accommodate rule changes between different editions of the game, explained through magical events within the fictional universe.

Areas of the planet inspired by non-Western real-world cultures, namely Chult, Kara-Tur, Maztica and Al-Qadim's Zakhara, have been criticized for perpetuating simplistic and harmful stereotypes. In July 2020, Wizards of the Coast added a sensitivity disclaimer to digitally sold products describing such regions, to acknowledge and distance themselves from problematic content.

Medievalist Amy S. Kaufman listed Kara-Tur and the Anauroch desert of Faerûn in 2010 as two of the few fantastic realms based on non-European medieval cultures to date. She remarked that the setting descriptions "reinforce their distance from the "real" Middle Ages", "which suggests that the [non-Western] realms may be outside the imaginative limits of designers, at least for now".

Screen Rant author Derek Garcia questioned the use of Abeir-Toril "as the default setting of modern-day Dungeons & Dragons", as he saw many problematic stereotypes published in the game's history as associated with this world.
