= Rick Swan =

American game designer and writer

- Born: United States
- Occupations: Writer, game designer
- Writing career
- Genres: Role-playing games, fantasy, wargames

Rick Swan is a game designer and author who worked for TSR. His work for TSR, mostly for Advanced Dungeons & Dragons, appeared from 1989 to 1995.

Swan also wrote The Complete Guide to Role-Playing Games (1990), published by St. Martin's Press. He was a regular columnist for InQuest Gamer.

== Publications ==
- Monstrous Compendium: Dragonlance Appendix, 1989
- Monstrous Compendium: Kara-Tur Appendix, 1990
- The Complete Wizard's Handbook, 1990
- Marvel Super Heroes The Uncanny X-MEN Adventure Book, 1990
- The Complete Ranger's Handbook, 1993
- The Complete Paladin's Handbook, 1994
- The Complete Barbarian's Handbook, 1995
- The Complete Book of Villains, 1994
- In the Cage: A Guide to Sigil, 1995 (with Wolfgang Baur)
- The Great Glacier, 1992
- Nightmare Keep (Advanced Dungeons & Dragons/Forgotten Realms module FA2), 1990
- Dragon Magic, 1989
- The Complete Guide to Role-Playing Games, 1990
- The Heart of the Enemy, 1992
- Ronin Challenge (Advanced Dungeons and Dragons/Forgotten Realms/Oriental Adventures Module OA6), 1990 (With Curtis Smith)
- In Search of Dragons (AD&D/Dragonlance Module DLE1), 1989
- Caravans, 1990

== See also ==
- Dungeons & Dragons
