= The Bestiary (Atlantis) =

Tabletop role-playing game supplement

Cover art by P.D. Breeding, 1986

The Bestiary, subtitled A Compendium of Creatures and Beings from the Lost World of Atlantis, is a supplement published by Bard Games in 1986 for The Atlantean Trilogy fantasy role-playing game, later known simply as Atlantis.

== Contents ==
The Bestiary is a supplement which describes many fantastical creatures that can be used in the Atlantis role-playing game. The book is divided into two sections:

- Descriptions and illustrations of the creatures, which are grouped together as:
  - Sidhe
  - goblin races
  - sylvan races
  - giants
  - humanoids
  - wereos
  - hybrids and magical constructs
  - monstrosities
  - dragons
  - living dead
  - demons and devils
  - spirits and elementals
  - gods, as well as details of cults and secret societies
- The technical details and statistics of each creature necessary for the role-playing game.

== Publication history ==
In the 1980s a group of friends who played a customized version of Dungeons & Dragons — Vernie Taylor, Steven Cordovano, and Stephan Michael Sechi — decided to publish details of their home campaign and each put up $600 to form Bard Games. In 1983 the new company published three books known as the "Compleat Series": The Compleat Adventurer by Sechi, The Compleat Spell Caster by Taylor and Sechi, and The Compleat Alchemist by Cordovano and Sechi. No specific role-playing system rules were credited, the assumption being that players would use the popular Dungeons & Dragons rules.

The following year, these books were combined with a new role-playing system into one central rulebook, The Arcanum. This was followed by The Lexicon in 1985, which provided the setting, and The Bestiary in 1986, which provided the creatures. As a result, the role-playing game became known as The Atlantean Trilogy; later versions were titled simply Atlantis.

The Bestiary, a 132-page softcover book, was written by Sechi and J. Andrew Keith, with illustrations by Bill Sienkiewicz, and cover art by P.D. Breeding.

In 1988, following the publication of a second edition of The Arcanum, Bard Press combined The Lexicon and The Bestiary into a single book, Atlantis: The Lost World.

Sechi would go on to produce the role-playing game Talislanta, also published by Bard Games in 1987.

In the 2014 book Designer & Dragons: The '80s, game historian Shannon Appelcline wrote that "Because of the success of their Compleat books, Bard Games decided to combine the best information from those supplements within a game system and a setting. The result — which would become known as "The Atlantis Trilogy" — would really put Bard on the map. Stephan Michael Sechi oversaw this new and daunting project — which took three years to complete. Eventually he produced three books: The Arcanum (1984), The Lexicon (1985), and The Bestiary (1986). The system was clearly derivative of D&D, but it also introduced character skills and point-based character creation. The setting was a bit more unique, as it portrayed an antediluvian world of myth (though it also contained some off-key elements including typical fantasy races of D&D and even druids). Some players embraced the new game as a more complex D&D with a uniquely textured setting."

Appelcline also noted that Morrigan Press later "licensed the Talislanta setting from Stephan Michael Sechi and also bought the rights to two of his Atlantis rules books — The Lexicon and The Bestiary."

== Reception ==
Phil Frances reviewed all three books of The Atlantean Trilogy for White Dwarf #85, and stated that "The Bestiary is my favourite because of the illustrations by Bill Sienkiewicz (of Marvel Comics) [...] A Monster Manual done with taste."

== Other reviews ==
- Space Gamer/Fantasy Gamer, Issue 79 (Aug 1987, p. 41)
