= A Naturalist's Guide to Talislanta =

A Naturalist's Guide to Talislanta is a supplement published by Bard Games in 1987 for the fantasy role-playing game Talislanta.

== Publication history ==
In 1982, Stephan Michael Sechi, Steven Cordovano and Vernie Taylor formed the company Bard Games to produce their own Dungeons & Dragons supplements. In 1986, due to personal and financial disagreements that arose after the publication of The Atlantis Trilogy, Sechi sold his shares in Bard Games to Cordovano and left} to begin work on another role-playing game system and its supplements. When Cordovano decided that he did not want to run Bard Games and sold it back to Sechi, Sechi had the opportunity to publish his new his new game, Talislanta.

After publication of the rules of the role-playing game in The Talislantan Handbook in 1987, Sechi also published three supplements: A Naturalist's Guide to Talislanta, The Chronicles of Talislanta, and Talislanta Sorcerer's Guide.

== Contents ==
A Naturalist's Guide to Talislanta is a 118-page perfect-bound softcover book with illustrations by P.D. Breeding-Black. The book acts as a bestiary for the Talislanta game, and includes complete information on all the creatures and plants mentioned in The Talislantan Handbook, both domesticated and wild. In addition, details of sentient races such as Elementals and Diabolics are included, and short descriptions for all known non-human races living on the continent.

== Reception ==
Stewart Wieck reviewed A Naturalist's Guide to Talislanta for White Wolf #11, and stated that "A Naturalist's Guide to Talislanta is a compilation of notes written by Tamerlin concerning the flora and fauna of Talislanta" and describes the Zarathan in particular as "awesome".

In the March 1989 edition of Dragon (Issue #143), Jim Bambra found the artwork useful, saying, "All of the creatures and plants discussed are accompanied by illustrations which add greatly to the atmosphere of the work." Bambra concluded, "This book will also be of interest to anyone looking for new creatures to use in other games."

In the July-August 1989 edition of Space Gamer (Vol. II No. 1), Craig Sheeley commented that "True to form, many of the creatures that roam Talislanta would disturb a zoologist - they're close enough to Earth-norm to mistake them for regular creatures (some of them, that is) but alien enough to be very different."
