= Talislanta Sorcerer's Guide =

Role-playing game supplement

Cover art by P.D. Breeding-Black

Talislanta Sorcerer's Guide is a supplement published by Bard Games in 1988 for the fantasy role-playing game Talislanta.

== Contents ==
Talislanta Sorcerer's Guide builds on the magic system outlined in The Talislantan Handbook, adding information about new spells, powerful magical tomes, magical and alchemical research, selected famous historical mages from Talislanta, new character classes involving magician by character race, the Lycean Arcanum college for teaching magic, the structure of the Omniverse that Talislanta is a part of, and a short fiction piece.

The book includes:

- Maps and descriptions of the Lyceum Arcanum, Cymril's great magic academy, as well as the courses taught there.
- Presentations of the ancient and powerful magicians of antiquity, along with a list of their (very rare) spells, and their (even rarer!) enchanted books and objects.
- A chapter dedicated to extra-dimensional entities and parallel planes.
- A dozen new archetypes more or less connected to magic and its practices.

A short story is also included.

== Publication history ==
In 1982, Stephan Michael Sechi, Steven Cordovano and Vernie Taylor formed the company Bard Games to produce their own Dungeons & Dragons supplements. In 1986, due to personal and financial disagreements that arose after the publication of The Atlantis Trilogy, Sechi sold his shares in Bard Games to Cordovano and left} to begin work on another role-playing game system and its supplements. When Cordovano decided that he did not want to run Bard Games and sold it back to Sechi, Sechi had the opportunity to publish his new his new role-playing game, Talislanta.

After publication of the game rules in The Talislantan Handbook in 1987, Sechi also published three supplements: A Naturalist's Guide to Talislanta, The Chronicles of Talislanta, and in 1988, Talislanta Sorcerer's Guide, a 104-page perfect-bound softcover book with cover art by P.D. Breeding-Black and interior art by Breeding-Black and Patty Sechi.

== Reception ==
In Issue 42 of Abyss, Dave Nalle called this "a very well put together aid. The background information in interesting, the ideas are often original and the presentation is pretty good." Nalle concluded, "I think that many gamemasters would find the Sorcerer's Handbook quite useful."

Stewart Wieck reviewed Talislanta Sorcerer's Guide for White Wolf #11, and stated that "True to its name, the book provides a bit of information concerning magic - from rare spells to magical items."

In the July–August 1989 edition of Space Gamer (Vol. II No. 1), Craig Sheeley commented that "The book does contain useful information, especially the spells for dimension-bending and for dealing with the beings who enter through such interdimensional spells."

In the March 1989 edition of Dragon (Issue #143), Jim Bambra found the short piece of fiction quite good, saying, "The story moves along at a good pace and makes good reading." Bambra was not sure if this book was a necessary purchase, commenting that "The Sorcerer's Guide is a useful addition to the Talislanta series, but it is not essential as magic is adequately covered in The Talislantan Handbook." However, he concluded, "it is a valuable sourcebook to anyone interested in studying the magic of Talislanta and its associated planes of existence."

Four issues later, in the July 1989 edition of Dragon (Issue 147), Ken Rolston was not as impressed; his first impression was of an "awkward and unsophisticated jumble of high-fantasy magic ideas." He found the contents badly organized, and the "undetailed floor and city maps with brief description keys were unimpressive, and the adventure and scenario ideas were brief, common, and unexciting." However, for a referee looking to transport ideas from the book into a different role-playing system, Rolston thought the book was "more effective as an open-ended menu of ideas for the GM to develop in his own campaign." He concluded, "The virtues of the Talislanta Sorcerer's Guide are not as sophisticated and polished as [...] other products [...] but the quantity and quality of high fantasy ideas here are noteworthy. Though not a first-class model of FRPG presentation or campaign development, as a sourcebook of ideas for high- fantasy campaigns [...] this book may be quite satisfying."
