= The Lexicon (Atlantis) =

Role-playing game supplement

Cover art by Scott Lee, 1985

The Lexicon, subtitled Atlas of the Lost World of Atlantis, is a supplement published by Bard Games in 1985 for The Atlantean Trilogy fantasy role-playing game, later known simply as Atlantis.

== Description ==
The Lexicon is an atlas that gives details about the ten regions of the world of The Atlantean Trilogy. The regions are covered in alphabetical order:

- Atlantis
- Elysium Sea
- Eria and Anostos
- Gondwana
- Jambu
- Lemuria
- Mediterranea
- Mu
- North Sea
- Tamoanchan

Each region is accompanied by a map of the region, its history, its current status, how it is subdivided into kingdoms and large islands, and notable cities and towns.

== Publication history ==
In the 1980s a group of friends who played a customized version of Dungeons & Dragons — Vernie Taylor, Steven Cordovano, and Stephan Michael Sechi — decided to publish details of their home campaign and each put up $600 to form Bard Games. In 1983 the new company published three books known as the "Compleat Series": The Compleat Adventurer by Sechi, The Compleat Spell Caster by Taylor and Sechi, and The Compleat Alchemist by Cordovano and Sechi. No specific role-playing system rules were credited, the assumption being that players would use the popular Dungeons & Dragons rules.

The following year, these books were combined with a new role-playing system into one central rulebook, The Arcanum. This was followed by The Lexicon in 1985, which provided the setting, and The Bestiary in 1986, which provided the creatures. As a result, the role-playing game became known as The Atlantean Trilogy; later versions were titled simply Atlantis.

The Lexicon, a 136-page book with a removable two-color map, was written by Sechi, Taylor, and Ed Mortimer, with interior artwork by Joe Bouza, Ken Canossi, and Roy MacDonald, and cover art by Scott Lee. It does not contain any role-playing rules, and can be used with any role-playing system.

In 1988, following the publication of a second edition of The Arcanum, Bard Press combined The Lexicon and The Bestiary into a single book, Atlantis: The Lost World.

Sechi would go on to produce the role-playing game Talislanta, also published by Bard Games in 1987.

In the 2014 book Designers & Dragons: The '80s, game historian Shannon Appelcline wrote that "Because of the success of their Compleat books, Bard Games decided to combine the best information from those supplements within a game system and a setting. The result — which would become known as "The Atlantis Trilogy" — would really put Bard on the map. Stephan Michael Sechi oversaw this new and daunting project — which took three years to complete. Eventually he produced three books: The Arcanum (1984), The Lexicon (1985), and The Bestiary (1986). The system was clearly derivative of D&D, but it also introduced character skills and point-based character creation. The setting was a bit more unique, as it portrayed an antediluvian world of myth (though it also contained some off-key elements including typical fantasy races of D&D and even druids). Some players embraced the new game as a more complex D&D with a uniquely textured setting."

Appelcline also noted that Morrigan Press later "licensed the Talislanta setting from Stephan Michael Sechi and also bought the rights to two of his Atlantis rules books — The Lexicon and The Bestiary."

== Reception ==
Phil Frances reviewed The Lexicon for White Dwarf #85, and noted the "oodles of pretty maps." He concluded, "Everywhere that's anywhere gets covered, from Khitai to Kush to Cimmeria (Conan? Who he?)."
