= The Talislantan Handbook =

Tabletop role-playing game supplement

- Publisher: Bard Games
- Publication date: 1987

The Talislantan Handbook is a supplement published by Bard Games in 1987 for the fantasy role-playing game Talislanta.

== Publication history ==
In 1982 Stephan Michael Sechi, Steven Cordovano and Vernie Taylor formed the company Bard Games to produce their own Dungeons & Dragons supplements. In 1986, due to personal and financial disagreements that arose after the publication of The Atlantis Trilogy, Sechi sold his shares in Bard Games to Cordovano and left, to begin work on another role-playing game system and its supplements. When Cordovano decided that he did not want to run Bard Games and sold it back to Sechi, Sechi had the opportunity to publish his new game, Talislanta.

After publication of the rules in The Talislantan Handbook in 1987, Sechi also published three supplements: The Chronicles of Talislanta, A Naturalist's Guide to Talislanta, and Talislanta Sorcerer's Guide.

== Contents ==
The Talislantan Handbook is an 88-page perfect-bound softcover book with illustrations by P.D. Breeding-Black that contains necessary game material for the Talislantan world, including information on character generation, and rules for combat and magic, as well as skills and equipment. Miscellaneous details such as the Talislantan calendar, a glossary of common terms, and a weather generation system are included. There are also a few brief adventure ideas.

=== Character generation ===
Characters are essentially pre-generated, with over 80 character types defined by race, nationality, ability scores, skills, equipment and background. Players pick the type of character they wish to play, then individualize it by increasing one ability by three points; decreasing one ability by one point; and adding an additional skill.

=== Task resolution ===
All task resolutions, whether for combat, magic or skills/attributes, are resolved on a single table using a twenty-sided die.

== Reception ==
Stewart Wieck reviewed The Talislanta Handbook for White Wolf #11, and stated that "The Talislanta Handbook establishes a game system for the Talislanta world" and describes some of the character types as "interesting".

In the March 1989 edition of Dragon (Issue #143), Jim Bambra liked the streamlined rules system, saying it "means that large numbers of pages do not need to be dedicated to explaining and clarifying rules." Bambra felt the only drawback to this was "the burden the system places on the GM in determining modifiers and situations. More help and examples would have made the game system easier to use for GMs not used to improvision. Help and examples would also have shown how to build color and atmosphere into a gaming session."

In the July–August 1989 edition of Space Gamer (Vol. II No. 1), Craig Sheeley "The Talislanta system makes a refreshing break from the tradition of character levels and level-innate skills."
