= The Arcanum (Atlantis) =

Tabletop role-playing game book

Cover of 1st edition, 1984

The Arcanum, published by Bard Games in 1984, is the first book in the fantasy role-playing game Atlantean Trilogy, later known simply as Atlantis.

== Contents ==
The Arcanum is the first book in The Atlantean Trilogy. It includes a role-playing system largely based on the rules for Dungeons & Dragons, but the generic information about the character classes and magic can also be used without the role-playing system, and adapted to another fantasy role-playing system such as D&D or RuneQuest to add an Atlantean flavor to the game.

== Publication history ==
In the 1980s a group of friends — Vernie Taylor, Steven Cordovano, and Stephan Michael Sechi — who played a highly customized version of Dungeons & Dragons, decided to publish the details of their new character classes and spells. Each of them put up $600 to form Bard Games. In 1983 the new company published three books known as the "Compleat Series": The Compleat Adventurer by Sechi, The Compleat Spell Caster by Taylor and Sechi, and The Compleat Alchemist by Cordovano and Sechi. No specific role-playing system rules were credited, the assumption being that players would use the popular Dungeons & Dragons rules.

The following year, the books of The Compleat Series were combined with a new role-playing system into one central rulebook, The Arcanum, a 156-page softcover book by Sechi and Taylor, with artwork by Sechi, Joe Bouza, Ken Canossi, Pete Ciccone, David Cooper, Scott Lee, Roy McDonald, and Katherine McHone. This was followed in 1985 by The Lexicon, a 128-page softcover book by Sechi, Taylor and Ed Mortimer that provided the setting, and The Bestiary in 1986, a 132-page softcover book written by Sechi and J. Andrew Keith that provided the creatures. As a result, the role-playing game became known as The Atlantean Trilogy or The Atlantis Trilogy; later versions with fewer than three books were simply titled Atlantis.

In the 2014 book Designers & Dragons: The '80s, game historian Shannon Appelcline wrote that "Because of the success of their Compleat books, Bard Games decided to combine the best information from those supplements within a game system and a setting. The result — which would become known as "The Atlantis Trilogy" — would really put Bard on the map. Stephan Michael Sechi oversaw this new and daunting project — which took three years to complete. Eventually he produced three books: The Arcanum (1984), The Lexicon (1985), and The Bestiary (1986). The system was clearly derivative of D&D, but it also introduced character skills and point-based character creation. The setting was a bit more unique, as it portrayed an antediluvian world of myth (though it also contained some off-key elements including typical fantasy races of D&D and even druids). Some players embraced the new game as a more complex D&D with a uniquely textured setting."

A second edition of The Arcanum was published in 1985 by Bard Games with revised and updated rules.

In 1996, Death's Edge Games released a third edition, largely based on the second edition, with the addition of a new race, the Selkie.

In 2012, K. David Ladage purchased the rights to The Arcanum. The following year, doing business as ZiLa Games, Ladage ran a Kickstarter to re-release The Arcanum in a new, cleaned up and re-edited form. However, when ZiLa was unable to deliver after three years, all backers were reimbursed their entire pledge. In 2017, he ran a second Kickstarter to re-release The Arcanum and both a PDF of the book and the book itself were delivered in 2019.

== Reception ==
William A. Barton reviewed the first edition of The Arcanum in Space Gamer No. 74., and commented that "Overall, The Arcanum seems quite adequate as volume one of a new FRPG [fantasy role-playing game], and could prove valuable as a supplement for other FRPGs, especially those deficient in alchemical information." Barton

In the December 1986 edition of White Dwarf (Issue #85), Phil Frances reviewed the original edition of The Arcanum, and noted the similarities to Dungeon & Dragons, commenting "I found myself playing Spot the D&D Equivalent — a game not mentioned in the book. It sure whiffs of That Game a lot [...] It's pretty obvious from the start which game this was primaririly intended for." He concluded that The Arcanum was probably not an essential buy for more experienced gamers, saying, "You can get by without this if you already own a roleplaying game; if not, its a solid starting base."
