= Atlantis: The Lost World =

Atlantis: The Lost World is a 1988 role-playing game supplement published by Bard Games for Atlantis.

== Contents ==
Atlantis: The Lost World is a supplement in which a campaign setting is presented that compiles information from The Lexicon and The Bestiary, along with additional new material.

== Publication history ==
Atlantis: The Lost World was written by Stephan Michael Sechi, Vernie Taylor, Ed Mortimer, and J. Andrew Keith, with a cover by P.D. Breeding-Black and published by Bard Games in 1989 as a 280-page book.

Shannon Appelcline noted that "The first edition of Talislanta was published on a shoe-string budget but it was sufficiently successful to allow Bard Games to retrench and expand. Sechi was thus able to collect his Atlantis setting material into a new sourcebook, Atlantis: The Lost Worlds (1988) and shortly afterward could publish a second edition of the Talislanta game in the Talislanta Handbook & Campaign Guide (1989)." Appelcline noted dropping sales numbers on further publications however, and stated that "Another, bigger problem was caused by Atlantis: The Lost World, that last legacy of the company's earlier days. A buyer from Waldenbooks who was not too familiar with RPGs decided to place a huge order for the book. Sechi was reluctant to fill it but eventually did. About a year later many of the books were returned, forcing Bard Games to refund about $20,000. That was the death knell of the company."
