= Curtis M. Scott =

American writer (1960–1992)

Curtis Matthew Scott
- Born: September 6, 1960
- Died: August 19, 1992 (aged 31)
- Resting place: Maple Hill Cemetery (Huntsville, Alabama)
- Occupation: Game designer
- Spouse: Mary

Curtis Matthew Scott (September 6, 1960 – August 19, 1992) was an American software architect and role-playing game designer known for his work on approximately thirty role-playing games and books primarily focused on Dungeons and Dragons. He attended the University of New Orleans and Carnegie Mellon University, received his master's in computer science during which time he published works contributing to the field of software. Scott was accepted to the PhD program in computer science at Carnegie Mellon University just prior to his death on August 19, 1992, at the age of 31.

== Biography ==
Curtis Matthew Scott was born in Atlanta, Georgia, on September 6, 1960, to Harold George Scott of Williams Arizona and Bettie Tabakin Scott of Philadelphia, Pennsylvania, the sixth of nine children. His father, Dr. Harold George Scott was in the military and the family traveled to New Orleans (1967), and then Glenn Dale, Maryland (1969) where his father worked as the first Deputy Directory of the Environmental Protection Agency when it was created under the Nixon Administration in 1971, detailed as a commissioned officer of the United States Public Health Service. During this assignment Dr. Scott helped prepare portions of President Richard Nixon's first State of the Union Address, delivered January 21, 1970.

The family returned to New Orleans (1972) where Curtis Scott attended grade school and then West Jefferson High School. Scott skipped from first to third grade, and from third to fifth grade resulting in attending school with students two years older than him. Scott attended the University of New Orleans, entering college at 15 years of age under a hybrid high school/college program.

In 1992 Scott completed his master's in software engineering at Carnegie Mellon University. In May 1992, three months prior to his death he was accepted to the PhD program in Computer Science at Carnegie Mellon University.

Scott worked for a software firm in Mississippi and spent four months performing classified software-related work on a Navy ship off of the coast of South Korea (1980)., and authored key papers in the field of software on topics including software architecture, disconnected messaging, and breaking of software systems into components, approaches used in modern software systems including cloud-based systems.

In addition to his work in the field of software, Scott authored approximately thirty role-playing games and books primarily focused on Dungeons and Dragons, and served as convention chairperson for CoastCon, which started in two rooms of a Holiday Inn hotel and grew to the largest science fiction convention in the southeast United States, eventually held and today still held at the Mississippi Coast Colosseum.

Curtis Matthew Scott was killed in an automobile accident near Ravenna Ohio on August 19, 1992, at age 31 while on the way to a Gen Con/Origins game fair. He was survived by his wife Mary and their son, Phillip.

== Career ==
=== Role Playing Games and Books ===
Curtis M. Scott wrote numerous role playing-related games and books including:

- Cyber Hero for Hero Games (co-author).
- Horde Campaign for Dungeons & Dragons
- GURPS Basic Set, 3rd Ed.
- GURPS Conan
- GURPS Grimoire
- GURPS Humanx
- Mythic Europe (Ars Magica)
- Pirates of the Fallen Stars (Forgotten Realms)
- Sea of Fallen Stars (Forgotten Realms)
- The Complete Spacefarer's Handbook
- The Cyclopedia Talislanta series for Talislanta
- The Ivory Triangle (Dark Sun)
- The Tsolyáni Primer
- Year of the Phoenix

Prior to his death Scott accepted a major project for TSR's Dark Sun campaign world.

=== CoastCon (Science fiction, Fantasy and Gaming convention) ===
For several years, Scott and his wife Mary organized the annual CoastCon gaming and science-fiction convention in Biloxi, Mississippi., and Curtis served as convention chairperson for CoastCon, which started in two rooms of a Holiday Inn hotel and grew to the largest science fiction convention in the southeast United States, eventually held and today still held at the Mississippi Coast Colosseum.

=== Contributions to the field of Software ===
Prior to his death in 1992 Curtis Scott produced key published works in the field of software engineering on topics including object oriented design, disconnected messaging, implicit invocation, and breaking of software systems into components, many of which concepts and approaches are in use in modern software systems including cloud-based systems. Curtis Scott's published works in the field of software include:

- Adding Implicit Invocation to Traditional Programming Languages. Proceedings of the 15th International Conference on Software Engineering (May 1993). Also CMU-CS-92-217
- Reactive Integration for Traditional Programming Languages
- Experience with a Course on Architectures for Software Systems Part I: Course Description
- Extending Ada with Event Broadcast
- Candidate Model Problems in Software Architecture (Scott's work referenced). Discussion draft 1.2 in circulation for development of community consensus

In May 1992, three months prior to his death, Curtis Scott was accepted to the PhD program in computer science at Carnegie Mellon University.

The Carnegie Mellon University Institute for Software Research Master of Software Engineering Professional Programs Student Handbook is dedicated to Curtis M. Scott.

== Death ==
Curtis Matthew Scott was killed on August 19, 1992, at age 31, in an automobile accident on his way to the Gen Con/Origins game fair. He was survived by his wife Mary and their son, Phillip, as well as immediate members of his family.
