= The Cyclopedia Talislanta Volume II: The Seven Kingdoms =

Role-playing game supplement

The Cyclopedia Talislanta
- Cover art, 1989
- Genre: Role-playing games
- Publisher: Bard Games
- Publication date: 1990
- Media type: book

The Cyclopedia Talislanta Volume II: The Seven Kingdoms is a supplement published by Bard Games in 1989 for the fantasy role-playing game Talislanta.

== Contents ==
The Cyclopedia Talislanta Volume II: The Seven Kingdoms is a campaign setting supplement that details the seven kingdoms, with information on new regional types and two adventure scenarios.

== Publication history ==
Bard Games published the role-playing game Talislanta in 1987. Over the next three years, the company published six volumes of supplemental information about the setting in their Cyclopedia Talislanta series. The second in the series, The Cyclopedia Talislanta Volume II: The Seven Kingdoms, was written by Thomas M. Kane, Anthony Pryor, Curtis M. Scott, and Craig Sheeley, and edited by W.G. Armintrout and Stephan Michael Sechi. Artwork was by Ron Spencer, Patty Sechi, Richard Thomas, and Stephan Michael Sechi. It was published by Bard Games in 1989 as a 72-page softcover book.

== Reception ==
Stewart Wieck reviewed the product in the February–March 1990 issue of White Wolf. He praised its illustrations and "wondrous array of material" while noting its adventures were "short and a little too sketchy". He rated it overall at a 4 out of 5 possible points.

== Reviews ==
- Alarums & Excursions #187 ("Mermecolion at a Picnic", March 1991)
