= Tribal (disambiguation) =

Tribal often refers to tribe, a clan-based social structure.

Tribal may also refer to:

== Groups of people ==
- Tribalism, strong cultural or ethnic identity that separates members of one group from another
- Tribals or Adivasi, ethnic and tribal groups claimed to be the aboriginal population of India
- Scheduled Tribes, legally designated disadvantaged groups in India

== Art and music ==
- Tribal art, visual arts and culture of indigenous peoples
- Tribal (TV series), Canadian television crime drama series, which premiered 2020 on Aboriginal Peoples Television Network
- Tribal (Dr. John album), 2010
- Tribal (Imelda May album), 2014
- "Tribal", a song by All Saints from Red Flag
- "Tribal", a song by P.O.D. from The Fundamental Elements of Southtown
- "Tribal", an instrumental song by Jeff Beck from "Live+" (2015)
- Tribal house, a subgenre of house music
- An alternate term for the music genre World music

== Other uses ==
- Tribal colleges and universities in North America
- Tribal Gear, a Clothing and Accessories Company

== See also ==
- Tribal class (disambiguation)
- Tribe (disambiguation)
