= MOBICON =

Multi-genre fan convention in the United States

Coordinates: 30°41′39″N 88°2′34″W

- Status: Active
- Genre: Multi-genre
- Venue: Riverview Hotel
- Locations: Mobile, Alabama
- Country: United States
- Inaugurated: 1998
- Attendance: 1800–2300
- Organizer: The Mobicon Foundation
- Filing status: 501(c)(3)
- Website: mobiconfoundation.com

MOBICON is an annual fan convention held in Mobile, Alabama. Named for an earlier convention known formally as the Mobile Comic Art and Science Fiction Festival, MOBICON was re-founded in 1998 and its membership has steadily grown since its inception. MOBICON is a multigenre convention with a broad focus on many aspects of popular culture, fandom including science fiction, fantasy, gaming, movies, anime, horror, art, and comics.

Every year actors, authors, artists and their fans come to MOBICON. A portion of MOBICON's proceeds benefit a charity that is chosen by its Board of Directors. each year.

== Events ==
Members of MOBICON can participate in many unique fan themed events including discussion panels, charity auctions, a dealers room, an art show and auction, promotional events, video rooms, a film festival, a fan-sponsored dance, 24-hour gaming, and costume contests. Select events, such as the costume contest, are structured so that fans with varying skill levels may participate. The convention also features a "con suite" lounge area with refreshments for members and staff.

== Structure ==
All attendees of MOBICON are not ticket-holders but rather pay to become members of the non-profit organization hosting the convention. As such, all members are encouraged to attend meetings, join committees and elect committee heads. As a not-for profit organization, MOBICON is organized and run by volunteers.

== Charity ==
MOBICON's board of directors choose a charity each year to benefit from fundraising efforts at that year's convention. Over half of MOBICON's proceeds benefit the chosen charity every year. Over the years, these charities have included the Make a Wish Foundation, the Bay Area Food Bank, and the Mobile SPCA. MOBICON's parent organization, Mobicon Inc., is itself a Federally-recognized not-for-profit tax-exempt entity under 501(a) and 501(c)(4).

== Conventions ==
2000
MOBICON 2000 was held May 12-14, 2000, at the Ramada Inn on the Bay in Mobile. Guests included author Sharon Green.

2001
MOBICON IV was held June 1-3, 2001, at the Ramada Inn on the Bay in Mobile.

2002
MOBICON V was held May 31-June 2, 2002, at the Ramada Inn on the Bay in Mobile. Guests included actress Virginia Hey, author Sharon Green, and author Deborah Wiles.

2003
MOBICON VI was held May 16-18, 2003, at the Airport Plaza Hotel in Mobile.

2004
MOBICON VII was held May 21-23, 2004, at the Airport Plaza Hotel in Mobile. Guests included actor John Fleck, actress Stephanie Beacham, author Davey Beauchamp, writer Deborah Wiles, Mark Worrell, Dale Kemper, and Bobby Rodgers.

2005
MOBICON VIII was held May 20-22, 2005, at the Airport Plaza Hotel in Mobile. Guests included actor Bill Blair and author Davey Beauchamp.

2006
MOBICON IX was held May 19-21, 2006, at the Ashbury Hotel & Suites in Mobile. Guests included actors Billy West, Ellen Muth, and Lucien Eisenach, authors Deborah Wiles, Jody Lyn Nye, and Davey Beauchamp, artists Steve Bennett and Ellisa Mitchell, plus Fan Guest of Honor Tony Kimsey. This year's designated charity was the Bay Area Food Bank. Special programming included a dance sponsored by Rocky Unbound and a "$20 Movie Contest" sponsored by Southern Ronin Films. Total attendance for the convention was reported as 543 total attendees, including guests and paid members.

2007
MOBICON X was held May 18-20, 2007, at the Best Western Ashbury Hotel & Suites in Mobile. Guests included actress and singer Chase Masterson, writer/director James Kerwin, voice actor and puppeteer Jeff Breslauer, authors Eugie Foster, Davey Beauchamp, and Sharon Green, plus anime artist Steven Bennett, and writer Deborah Wiles. This year's designated charity was the Bay Area Food Bank, a subsidiary of America's Second Harvest.

2008
MOBICON XI was held May 16-18, 2008, at the Ashbury Hotel & Suites in Mobile. Guests included author Jim Butcher and actor Colin Cunningham. This year's designated charity was the Bay Area Food Bank and the members raised roughly $6,500 in cash for the charity in addition to a large quantity of donated non-perishable food items.

2009
MOBICON XII was held May 15-17, 2009, at the Ashbury Hotel & Suites in Mobile. Guests included voice actors George Lowe and Tiffany Grant, authors Deborah Wiles, Davey Beauchamp, and Sharon Green, plus artists Theresa Mather and Larry Elmore. Special programming included a "Sci-Fi Sock Puppet Theater" re-enactment of an episode of Battlestar Galactica, "Blood on the Scales" as "Blood on the Socks" by New Orleans science fiction club Area 504. This year's designated charity was the Bay Area Food Bank. Charity efforts included a canned food drive competition between fans of the Stargate and Star Trek science fiction franchises.

2010
MOBICON XIII was held May 14-16, 2010, at the Ashbury Hotel & Suites in Mobile. Guests included actor and author Gunnar Hansen as well as The Wandering Men, including Nathan Ellsworth, R. Brannon Hall, Brannon Hollingsworth, and Davis Riddle. The convention was dubbed "Mobicon the 13th" and featured a horror theme. Special programming included panels featuring paranormal investigators, horror movie screenings, and a meeting of the USA Horror Club. Attendance for the weekend was reported as 692 members.

2011
MOBICON XIV was held May 20-22, 2011, at the Ashbury Hotel & Suites in Mobile. Guests included actor Robert Picardo, voice actors Sonny Strait and Todd Haberkorn, artists Larry Elmore and Ruth Thompson, plus paranormal investigators Ghost Hunters of the South. (Actor Ethan Phillips was previously announced as the headline guest but he had to withdraw due to a family emergency.) This year's designated charity was the Bay Area Food Bank. Unlike most previous MOBICONs, the 2011 event had no specific theme. Attendance for the weekend was reported as 792 members.

2012
MOBICON XV was scheduled to be held May 18-20, 2012, at the Ashbury Hotel & Suites in Mobile.
