= Tribe (disambiguation) =

A tribe in anthropology is a human social group.

Tribe, tribes, Tri.be or the Tribe may also refer to:

== Native American tribes or tribal nations ==
- Tribe (Native American)
- List of federally recognized tribes in the United States

== Arts, entertainment and media ==
=== Film ===
- Tribes (film), or The Soldier Who Declared Peace, 1970
- The Tribe (1998 film), a TV drama by Stephen Poliakoff
- The Tribe (2005 film), a short documentary
- The Tribe (2009 film), or After Dusk They Come
- The Tribe (2014 film), a Ukrainian drama
- The Tribe (2018 film), a Spanish comedy

=== Literature ===
- Tribe (comics), a short-lived comic series
- Tribe, a 2016 book by Sebastian Junger
- Tribe Magazine, Canada, 1993–2005
- Tribes, a 2002 novel by Arthur Slade
- Tribes: We Need You to Lead Us, a 2008 book by Seth Godin
- The Tribe (novel), by Michael Mohammed Ahmad, 2014
- The Tribe (Monica's Gang), a Brazilian comic strip
- Tribes, a 2020 book by David Lammy

=== Music ===
==== Groups ====
- Tribe (band), an American alternative rock band
- Tribes (band), a British indie rock group
- The Tribe (dance band), a British Christian music group
- A Tribe Called Quest, or Tribe, an American hip hop group
- Tri.be, South Korean girlgroup

==== Record labels ====
- Tribe Records, Detroit, U.S.
- Tribe Records (Norway)
- Tr1be Records, UK

==== Albums ====
- Tribe (Bernie Taupin album), 1987
- Tribe (Chase & Status album), 2017
- Tribe (Enrico Rava album), 2011
- Tribe (Queensrÿche album), 2003
- Tribe (Sadist album), or the title track
- Tribe (EP), by Soulfly, 1999
- Tribe, part of the 2008 compilation album Songs for Survival
- Tribes (Culture Club album), unreleased
- The Tribe (album), by Caspar Brötzmann, 1987

==== Songs ====
- "Tribe" (Soulfly song), by Soulfly, 1999
- "Tribe" (Bas and J. Cole song), 2018
- "The Tribe", a 2013 song by Odd Mob

=== Television ===
- Tribe (Australian TV series), 1999 miniseries
- Tribe (British TV series), a documentary, 2005–2007
- Tribe (Philippine TV series), 2006–2019
- Tribes (TV series), a soap opera, 1990
- "Tribes" (NCIS)
- "Tribe" (Star Wars: The Bad Batch)
- The Tribe (1999 TV series), a science fiction drama
- The Tribe (2015 TV series), a documentary
- The Tribe (2024 TV series), an Indian reality television series
- Tribal (TV series), a Canadian drama series which premiered in 2020
- Tribe, a group of contestants on Survivor

=== Other uses in arts and entertainment ===
- Tribes (play), Nina Raine, 2010
- Tribes (video game series)
- Tribes (supplement), a series of role-playing game supplements
- The Tribe (Tales of the Otori), a fictional organisation

== People ==
- George Tribe (1920–2009), an Australian cricketer
- Laurence Tribe (born 1941), an American law professor and author
- Mark Tribe (born 1966), an American artist

== Sports ==
- William & Mary Tribe, American college athletics teams
- The Tribe, a nickname for the formerly-named Cleveland Indians of Major League Baseball, now the Cleveland Guardians

== Other uses ==
- Adivasi, the collective term for 'tribal' populations in India
  - Scheduled Castes and Scheduled Tribes, the legal designation for Adivasi populations
- Tribe (taxonomy), a taxonomic classification in biology
- Tribe (internet), a slang term for an unofficial community of people who share a common interest
- Tribe.net, a former social networking website
- Tribes, administrative divisions of the Tribal assembly of ancient Rome
- The Tribe (Buzoku), a Japanese counter-cultural group
- Phyle, an ancient Greek term for tribe or clan
- Roman tribe, a division of the Roman people for military, censorial, and voting purposes.

== See also ==
- Twelve Tribes (disambiguation)
- Tribalism, organized by, or advocating for, tribes or tribal lifestyles
- Tribe v Tribe, an English trusts law case
