= The Cyclopedia Talislanta =

Role-playing game supplement

- Cover art by P.D. Breeding-Black
- Designers: Stephan Michael Sechi
- Illustrators: P.D. Breeding-Black; Ron Spencer; Patty Sechi; Richard Thomas
- Publishers: Bard Games
- Publication: 1988

The Cyclopedia Talislanta is a supplement published by Bard Games in 1988 for the fantasy role-playing game Talislanta.

== Contents ==
The Cyclopedia Talislanta, the fifth supplement about the world of Talislanta, provides world background and new material for gamemasters to incorporate into their Talislanta campaigns. This includes:

- an 8-page 4-color map of Talislanta
- places of interest in Talislanta
- new monsters, animals, and plants
- new character types
- new skills and abilities

== Publication history ==
Bard Books released the fantasy role-playing game Talislanta in 1987, and then published several books of supplemental information. The fifth supplement, released in 1988, was The Cyclopedia Talislanta, a 92-page softcover book written by Stephan Michael Sechi, with cover art by P.D. Breeding-Black, interior art by Ron Spencer, Patty Sechi, and Richard Thomas, and cartography by Patty Sechi.

== Reception ==
In Issue 43 of Abyss, Dave Nalle called this "One of the finest game aids I've seen in a long time." Nalle would have preferred that the map of Talislanta had been kept as a single insert instead of being separated into 8 pages. Nalle called the descriptions of every location shown on the map as "excellent. If characters are travelling overland you need only look up where they are going to get a good general idea of what they might encounter." Nalle thought the descriptions of animals and their illustration were quite good, pointing out the "consistency of style which gives a feeling of coherent environment." Nalle concluded, "This book is a great resource of ideas and an example of what game supplements should be like."

In Issue 14 of White Wolf (February 1989), Stewart Wieck called this "the most attractive of the line of products thus far." Wieck concluded by giving the book a rating of 4 out of 5, saying "Ownership of this book is a necessity for gamers with campaigns set in Talislanta. Other gamers should take a look just to see what Talislanta offers."

In the May 1989 edition of Dragon (Issue #145), Jim Bambra applauded the "excellent interior illustrations", and the wide range of new material. He concluded "GMs and players who already adventure in Talislanta or use it as a source of ideas will find plenty of interesting material within this books pages, as it adds more interesting detail and color to the setting."

In the July-August 1989 edition of Space Gamer (Vol. II No. 1), Craig Sheeley commented that "The encyclopedia-style information is listed alphabetically, a minor drawback which spreads specific places in the same areas throughout this section. The section new character race types is brief and concise, as is the gamemaster section (which takes up two pages with new weapons, skills and information.)"
