= Home (Caspar Brötzmann Massaker album) =

Studio album by Caspar Brötzmann Massaker
- Released: January 1995
- Recorded: 1994 at Studio Steinschlag
- Genre: Noise rock
- Length: 53:48
- Label: Our Choice
- Producer: F.M. Einheit, Bruno Gebhard

Caspar Brötzmann chronology
Merry Christmas (1994)	Home (1995)	Zulutime (1996)

Professional ratings
Review scores
Source	Rating
Allmusic	4/5 stars

Home is the fifth album by Caspar Brötzmann Massaker, released in January 1995 through Our Choice.

== Track listing ==
All tracks are written by Caspar Brötzmann

No.	Title	Length
1.	"The Tribe"	6:44
2.	"Tempelhof"	8:54
3.	"Massaker"	14:43
4.	"Hunter Song"	12:42
5.	"Böhmen"	10:45

== Personnel ==
Musicians

- Caspar Brötzmann – guitar, vocals, production, cover art
- Eduardo Delgado-Lopez – bass guitar, vocals
- Danny Arnold Lommen – drums

Production and additional personnel

- Dirk Rudolph – cover art
- F.M. Einheit – production
- Bruno Gebhard – production
