= Quantrigue =

Quantrigue is a 1993 role-playing adventure for Talislanta published by Wizards of the Coast.

== Plot summary ==
Quantrigue is an adventure in which the player characters are hired to join the Kang army of the Quan Empire.

== Reception ==
Mark A. Santillo reviewed Quantrigue in White Wolf #38 (1993), rating it a 3 out of 5 and stated that "Quantrigue is a likable and adequate sourcebook about the culture of the Kang. It is a good start to a grand adventure as yet untold. Unfortunately, nothing in its content justifies its length as a full-fledged adventure module."

== Reviews ==
- Papyrus (Issue 14 - April Fools 1994)
