= Talislanta Geographica =

Talislanta Geographica is a 1992 role-playing supplement for Talislanta published by Wizards of the Coast.

== Contents ==
Talislanta Geographica is a supplement in which a poster-sized map of the continent is included.

== Publication history ==
Talislanta Geographica is the first supplement published for the third edition of Talislanta.

== Reception ==
Mark A. Santillo reviewed Talislanta Geographica in White Wolf #37 (July/Aug., 1993), rating it a 3 out of 5 and stated that "Overall, this supplement is well-produced, but only partially successful. You might want to think twice about spending [the money] unless the GM's screen means that much to you."

== Reviews ==
- Papyrus (Issue 11 - Summer 1993)
