= Last Home =

Studio album by Caspar Brötzmann/Peter Brötzmann
- Released: 1990
- Recorded: August 19, 1990–August 24, 1990 at Greenpoint, Brooklyn, New York
- Genre: Free jazz
- Length: 59:52
- Label: Pathological
- Producer: Kevin Martin, Robert Musso

Caspar Brötzmann chronology
Black Axis (1989)	Last Home (1990)	Der Abend der schwarzen Folklore (1992)

Last Home is an album by guitarist Caspar Brötzmann and his father, saxophonist Peter Brötzmann. It was released in 1990 through Pathological Records.

== Reception ==
Professional ratings
Review scores
Source	Rating
AllMusic	4/5 stars
The Penguin Guide to Jazz	3/4 stars
The Virgin Encyclopedia of Jazz	3/5 stars

In a review for AllMusic, Scott Yanow wrote that the album "could serve as the soundtrack of a war," and commented: "The violent interplay between Caspar Brotzmann's acid rock guitar feedback... and Peter Brotzmann's bass sax, tenor, clarinet and tarogato... at first is quite jarring. However frequent playing of the CD (it if does not drive one nuts) reveals a logic to the free improvisations. It may not thrill one's neighbors at 3 am. but the performances are certainly quite stimulating and creative. Intense sound explorations."

The authors of the Penguin Guide to Jazz Recordings called the album "a remorseless meeting" and "a collision between two elemental forces," and noted: "even with amplification at his disposal, the younger man can't overpower his partner... Whether one hears it as energizing or tedious, it's quite devastating."

Deborah Sprague, writing for Trouser Press, stated: "On Last Home, the guitarist's collaboration with his father ranges from strangely poignant to outright hostile — the overall tone is not unlike one of those coming-of-age films wherein dad blusters about his accomplishments loud and long enough to prompt a raging retort from the young whippersnapper being challenged. In 1990, at least, the iron-lunged saxophonist got the better of his offspring: time will tell if Caspar can turn the tables."

Saxophonist Mats Gustafsson wrote: "Brutal album – not the mainstream bebop father & son meet really... this is something very very different... Scary intensity. SCARY. No one can be disappointed after hearing this incredible album."

Author Todd S. Jenkins described Last Home as "a frighteningly intense pairing of father and son," and remarked: "This set makes it glaringly obvious where Caspar got his unorthodox musical pedigree, as the two act out the ultimate in domestic violence."

== Track listing ==
All music is composed by Caspar Brötzmann and Peter Brötzmann

No.	Title	Length
1.	"Die, Saurier, Die"	3:54
2.	"Talk to the Canoe Driver"	9:59
3.	"Last Home"	4:39
4.	"Little Man in the Boat"	5:42
5.	"Doozandazzy"	4:30
6.	"Yazzihamper"	5:00
7.	"Witch Hazel in the Dark Afternoon"	5:46
8.	"Fette Biester"	5:58
9.	"Tantarabobs"	16:24

== Personnel ==
Musicians

- Caspar Brötzmann – guitar
- Peter Brötzmann – E-flat clarinet, tárogató, bass saxophone, tenor saxophone, design

Production and additional personnel

- Kevin Martin – production
- Robert Musso – production, engineering
- Larry Stanley – photography
