= GURPS Humanx =

Sourcebook for GURPS game system

Roleplaying in Alan Dean Foster's Humanx Commonwealth
- Cover art by Michael Whelan
- Designers: Curtis M. Scott
- Illustrators: Michael Whelan; Daniel E. Carroll; Steve Crompton; Michael A. Goodwin; C. Bradford Gorby; Jennell Jaquays; Denis Loubet; Michael Surbrook; Jason Waltrip; John D. Waltrip; George Webber; Dan Willems
- Publishers: Steve Jackson Games
- Publication: 1987; 39 years ago
- Genres: Science fiction
- Systems: GURPS second edition

GURPS Humanx, "Roleplaying in Alan Dean Foster's Humanx Commonwealth", is a science fiction sourcebook for the GURPS (Generic Universal Role-Playing System), written by Curtis M. Scott, and published by Steve Jackson Games in 1987. It is based on the Humanx series of science fiction novels by Alan Dean Foster.

== Contents ==
GURPS Humanx is a sourcebook that uses the second edition GURPS rules to define how to role-play within Foster's interstellar commonwealth of humans and the Thranx, allied insectoid aliens. The book is divided into eight sections:

1. Introduction
2. Humanx history: A history of the Humanx Commonwealth
3. Commonwealth Gazetteer: Descriptions of the mains worlds of the Commonwealth, their cultures, history, indigenous plant and animal life, and sapient lifeforms. It also includes scenario suggestions for the gamemaster.
4. Characters: Rules for character creation
5. Psionics: Rules for psionics
6. Spacecraft: Different types of spacecraft, and rules for spacecraft combat

The book also includes an introductory scenario set on the world of Moth, "A Message for Malaika". Several appendices list notable characters from the novels, contain space maps and include a summary of Foster's novels.

== Publication history ==
Alan Dean Foster wrote his first Humanx novel, The Tar-Aiym Krang, in 1972. By 1987, this had expanded to thirteen novels and a number of short stories. That was the year that Steve Jackson Games (SJG) acquired a license to create a Humanx role-playing game. The result was GURPS Humanx, a 96-page book written by Curtis M. Scott with Mary Scot and J. David George, with cover art by Michael Whelan — taken from Whalen's cover art for the Ballantine Books edition of Foster's novel Nor Crystal Tears — and interior art by Daniel E. Carroll, Steve Crompton, Michael A. Goodwin, C. Bradford Gorby, Jennell Jaquays, Denis Loubet, Michael Surbrook, Jason Waltrip, John D. Waltrip, George Webber, and Dan Willem.

== Reception ==
In Issue eight of Gateways, Alan Berkson called this "a detailed guide to this intriguing universe" and noted the marginalia that "contain useful tidbits of background information which highlight portions of the main sections." Berkson liked the depth of detail in the character generation rules, noting they outline "all the necessities for providing a character with background and gainful employment."

In a retrospective review in Issue 12 of Diary of the Doctor Who Role-Playing Game, Nick Seidler called this, "one of the most utilitarian RPG supplements that we have seen. The overview of the whole Humanx setting is brilliant, and there is enough information in this product’s 96 pages to give a Game Master hundreds of ideas and modules within a futuristic setting." Seidler concluded by giving this game a rating of 4 out of 5, saying "The GURPS Humanx supplement may be an older product but it is well worth tracking down."

== Legacy ==
The Space Gamer published a full-length GURPS Humanx adventure, "Doctor Niav's Papers", in their July–August 1989 issue.

== See also ==
- List of GURPS publications
