= Pirates of the Fallen Stars =

Dungeons & Dragons supplement

- Author: Curtis Scott
- Genre: Role-playing game
- Publisher: TSR
- Publication date: 1992
- Media type: Print (Paperback)
- Preceded by: The Drow of the Underdark
- Followed by: The Code of the Harpers

Pirates of the Fallen Stars is an accessory for the fictional Forgotten Realms campaign setting for the second edition of the Advanced Dungeons & Dragons fantasy role-playing game.

== Contents ==
The 128-page book begins with a one-page introduction entitled "A Pirate's Life for Me". Chapter 1 (pages 5–17) explores the mentality and lifestyle of pirates, including an explanation of what is piracy, a history of piracy in the Forgotten Realms setting, a few notable pirate organizations, and religions followed by pirates. Chapter 2 (pages 18–33) presents rules on how to generate pirate characters, and provides some new spells. Chapter 3 (pages 34–49) details the nations of the inner sea, including Cormyr, Sembia, and others, and how they are affected by piracy and smuggling. Chapter 4 (pages 50–68) provides a geographical and socio-political description of the Pirate Isles. Chapter 5 (pages 69–79) details nine of the most notorious pirates of the Sea of Fallen Stars. Chapter 6 (pages 80–94) presents a number of ships of the inner sea, including galleys and galleons common to the Sea of Fallen Stars. Chapter 7 (pages 96–110) reveals special rules for movement and combat on the sea. Chapter 8 (pages 111-125) features an adventure called "Raid on Teziir" for 5-8 player characters of 5th-7th level. Pages 126-127 consist of a glossary of "pirate-speak", or terminology used on ship.

== Publication history ==
Pirates of the Fallen Stars, with product code TSR 9346, was published in 1992, and was written by Curtis Scott, with cover art by Erik Olson and interior art by Jaime Lombardo, Clyde Caldwell, and Larry Elmore.

== Reviews ==
- Casus Belli #70 (July 1992)
