= Merry Christmas (FM Einheit and Caspar Brötzmann album) =

Studio album by F.M. Einheit/Caspar Brötzmann
- Released: April 1994
- Recorded: January 1993
- Studio: Conny Plank's Studio, Cologne
- Genre: Noise rock, industrial
- Length: 52:05
- Label: Our Choice
- Producer: Caspar Brötzmann, F.M. Einheit

Caspar Brötzmann chronology
Koksofen (1993)	Merry Christmas (1994)	Home (1995)

Professional ratings
Review scores
Source	Rating
Allmusic	2/5 stars

Merry Christmas is an album by Caspar Brötzmann and F.M. Einheit, released in April 1994 through Our Choice.

== Track listing ==
All music is composed by Caspar Brötzmann and F.M. Einheit.

No.	Title	Length
1.	"Panzerkette"	2:07
2.	"Nizzary"	2:29
3.	"Das 5 Federn Fuckhouse"	4:15
4.	"Merry Christmas"	4:59
5.	"Kowâ Axis"	7:30
6.	"Solingen"	4:00
7.	"Park der Löwen"	5:17
8.	"Headhunter Song"	4:44
9.	"Stück Frau das Uhrspiel"	2:13
10.	"Panzerketten"	7:09
11.	"[untitled]"	2:53
12.	"[untitled]"	1:42
13.	"[untitled]"	2:47

== Accolades ==
Year	Publication	Country	Accolade	Rank
1994	The Wire	United Kingdom	"Albums of the Year"	15

== Personnel ==
Musicians

- Caspar Brötzmann – guitar, production, cover art
- F.M. Einheit – bass guitar, keyboards, percussion, production

Production and additional personnel

- Dave Burton – cover art
- Bruno Gebhard – engineering
- Ingo Krauss – engineering
- Dirk Rudolph – cover art
