= Mute Massaker =

Studio album by Caspar Brötzmann
- Released: June 1999
- Recorded: December 1998 at Black Box Studios
- Genre: Noise rock
- Length: 60:06
- Label: Our Choice
- Producer: Caspar Brötzmann

Caspar Brötzmann chronology
| Zulutime (1996) | Mute Massaker (1999) |

Professional ratings
Review scores
| Source | Rating |
|---|---|
| Allmusic | 2/5 stars |
| Pitchfork Media | (3.8/10) |

Mute Massaker is an album by Caspar Brötzmann, released in June 1999 through Our Choice.

== Track listing ==
All music is composed by Caspar Brötzmann.

| No. | Title | Length |
|---|---|---|
| 1. | "Mute Massaker" | 9:55 |
| 2. | "Cheyenne" | 6:54 |
| 3. | "Pearl of Utah" | 8:55 |
| 4. | "Indians" | 13:30 |
| 5. | "Rain" | 9:29 |
| 6. | "Woodstock Hymne" | 11:23 |

== Accolades ==
| Year | Publication | Country | Accolade | Rank |
|---|---|---|---|---|
| 1999 | The Wire | United Kingdom | "Albums of the Year" | * |
"*" denotes an unordered list.

== Personnel ==
Musicians

- Caspar Brötzmann – guitar, illustrations
- Robert Dämmig – drums
- Ottmar Seum – bass guitar

Production and additional personnel

- Bruno Gebhard – engineering, mixing
