= The Scent of the Beast =

The Scent of the Beast is a 1992 role-playing adventure for Talislanta published by Wizards of the Coast.

== Plot summary ==
The Scent of the Beast is an adventure in which the player characters escort a trade barge while looking for a traitor.

== Publication history ==
Shannon Appelcline noted that in addition to The Primal Order, Wizards of the Coast "was simultaneously pushing other releases forward. The most notable of these was Jonathan Tweet's revision of the Talislanta Guidebook (1992), which was soon followed by the adventure The Scent of the Beast (1992), Wizard's first fiction book, Tales of Talislanta (1992), and other Talislanta releases; Wizards would produce over a half-dozen books for Talislanta through 1994."

The Scent of the Beast is the first adventure published for the third edition of Talislanta.

== Reception ==
Mark A. Santillo reviewed The Scent of the Beast in White Wolf #37 (July/Aug., 1993), rating it a 5 out of 5 and stated that "This is one of the most complete and thorough modules I have read. All the information you need to run the adventure in there. NPCs are well-crafted to match the level of beginning players, yet still challenge them and provoke their interest. All the details compose a lively portrait of Sindaran life and customs that will enhance any future adventures there."

== Reviews ==
- Papyrus (Issue 11 - Summer 1993)
