= Der Abend der schwarzen Folklore =

Studio album by Caspar Brötzmann Massaker
- Released: July 1992
- Recorded: September 1991 at Conny's Studio, Cologne, Germany
- Genre: Noise rock
- Length: 40:11
- Label: Our Choice
- Producers: Caspar Brötzmann, Bruno Gebhard, Ingo Krauss

Caspar Brötzmann chronology
Last Home (1990)	Der Abend der schwarzen Folklore (1992)	Koksofen (1993)

Professional ratings
Review scores
Source	Rating
Allmusic	2.5/5 stars

Der Abend der schwarzen Folklore is the third album by Caspar Brötzmann Massaker, released in July 1992 through Our Choice.

== Track listing ==
All tracks are written by Caspar Brötzmann.

No.	Title	Length
1.	"Schwarze Folklore"	8:30
2.	"Bass Totem"	12:01
3.	"Sarah"	10:42
4.	"War Horse"	8:58

== Personnel ==
Musicians

- Caspar Brötzmann – guitar, vocals, production, cover art
- Eduardo Delgado-Lopez – bass guitar
- Danny Arnold Lommen – drums

Production and additional personnel

- Bruno Gebhard – production
- Ingo Krauss – production
- Dirk Rudolph – cover art
