= Black Axis =

Studio album by Caspar Brötzmann Massaker
- Released: May 1989
- Recorded: March 1989 at FMP Studio, Berlin, Germany
- Genre: Noise rock
- Length: 45:45
- Label: Marat
- Producer: Caspar Brötzmann

Caspar Brötzmann chronology
| The Tribe (1987) | Black Axis (1989) | Last Home (1990) |

Black Axis is the second album by Caspar Brötzmann Massaker, released in May 1989 through Marat Records.

== Reception ==
Professional ratings
Review scores
| Source | Rating |
|---|---|
| AllMusic | 3/5 stars |
| Pitchfork | 8.6/10 stars |

In a review for AllMusic, Brian Olewnick stated that, on the album, Brötzmann "leads a remarkable power trio that manages to resuscitate all that was good about fuzz-heavy bands like Blue Cheer... while adding impassioned playing out of Hendrix and allowing himself an expansive space to develop his unique approach." He concluded: "Recommended for fans, rock and jazz alike, who thought that Hendrix was the last word in rock guitar."

Grayson Haver Currin of Pitchfork called the album "beautifully aggressive," and noted "just how much Brötzmann and his band resist easy codification. They claw and scrape at the divides between rock and jazz, funk and industrial, Hendrix and Haino, songs and chaos, dark and light, a power trio with a mind for breaking binaries."

A reviewer for Freq commented: "What is apparent is that there is a single-minded vision here that [Brötzmann] was more than capable of developing into an exciting and uncompromising rush of noise."

Fear and Loathing's Andy Pearson remarked: "hearing this album, it really would be difficult to imagine anyone surpassing these sounds. It is hard rock, but with such an intense and open delivery that it transcends the genre... this is an album that you really need to hear and, if you can listen to it with an open mind, it will truly blow you away."

== Track listing ==
All tracks are written by Caspar Brötzmann.

| No. | Title | Length |
|---|---|---|
| 1. | "Die Tiere" | 3:38 |
| 2. | "Hunter Song" | 7:59 |
| 3. | "Böhmen" | 8:21 |
| 4. | "Mute" | 5:14 |
| 5. | "Tempelhof" | 6:01 |
| 6. | "Black Axis" | 14:32 |

== Personnel ==
Musicians

- Caspar Brötzmann – guitar, vocals, production, cover art
- Eduardo Delgado-Lopez – bass guitar, vocals
- Frank Neumeier – drums

Production and additional personnel

- Peter Brötzmann – design
- Thomas Moritz – mixing, recording
