= The Chronicles of Talislanta =

Tabletop role-playing game supplement

- Publisher: Bard Games
- Publication date: 1987

The Chronicles of Talislanta is a supplement published by Bard Games in 1987 for the fantasy role-playing game Talislanta.

== Publication history ==
In 1982 Stephan Michael Sechi, Steven Cordovano and Vernie Taylor formed the company Bard Games to produce their own Dungeons & Dragons supplements. In 1986, due to personal and financial disagreements that arose after the publication of The Atlantis Trilogy, Sechi sold his shares in Bard Games to Cordovano and left, to begin work on another role-playing game system and its supplements. When Cordovano decided that he did not want to run Bard Games and sold it back to Sechi, Sechi had the opportunity to publish his new game, Talislanta.

== Contents ==
The Chronicles of Talislanta is an 88-page perfect-bound softcover book with illustrations by P.D. Breeding-Black that is an introduction to the continent of Talislanta, including its 29 countries and kingdoms and the people that populate them. The content is presented as the recollections of the wizard Tamerlin.

== Reception ==
Stewart Wieck reviewed The Chronicles of Talislanta for White Wolf #11, and stated that "Even a quick glance through this book will give you an idea of the magnitude and quality of the world that has been created here. Talislanta is not just a rip-off of some medieval world, but it is a complete and imaginative setting with its own people, cultures, legends, creatures, etc."

In the July-August 1989 edition of Space Gamer (Vol. II No. 1), Craig Sheeley enjoyed the details of the various cultures and races that inhabit the continent, saying, "More attention is given to the beings that inhabit each area, since the real uniqueness of Talislanta lies in the diverse people - at present count, over 70 sentient races or man-like species inhabit the continent."

In the March 1989 edition of Dragon (Issue #143), Jim Bambra called Tamerlin's accounts of his journeys "lively and informative." Bambra concluded, "The Chronicles of Talislanta is not a collection of entries to be dutifully plowed through in order to learn about this fabulous land. Instead, it’s fun to read and very colorful."
