= Koksofen =

Studio album by Caspar Brötzmann Massaker
- Released: June 1993
- Recorded: January 1993 at Conny's Studio, Cologne, Germany
- Genre: Noise rock, industrial
- Length: 60:44
- Label: Our Choice
- Producer: Caspar Brötzmann, Bruno Gebhard, Ingo Krauss

Caspar Brötzmann chronology
Der Abend der schwarzen Folklore (1992)	Koksofen (1993)	Merry Christmas (1994)

Professional ratings
Review scores
Source	Rating
Allmusic	3/5 stars

Koksofen is the fourth album by Caspar Brötzmann Massaker, released in June 1993 through Our Choice.

== Track listing ==
All tracks are written by Caspar Brötzmann, Eduardo Delgado-Lopez and Danny Arnold Lommen, except "Schlaf" with words by Langston Hughes and "Koksofen" by Caspar Brötzmann.

No.	Title	Length
1.	"Hymne" ("Hymn")	14:30
2.	"Wiege" ("Cradle")	8:06
3.	"Kerkersong" ("Dungeon Song")	10:44
4.	"Schlaf" ("Sleep")	11:10
5.	"Koksofen" ("Coke Oven")	16:14

== Accolades ==
Year	Publication	Country	Accolade	Rank
1993	The Wire	United Kingdom	"Albums of the Year"	29
2000	Terrorizer	United Kingdom	"100 Most Important Albums of the Nineties"	*
"*" denotes an unordered list.

== Personnel ==
Musicians

- Caspar Brötzmann – guitar, vocals, production, cover art, design
- Eduardo Delgado-Lopez – bass guitar
- Danny Arnold Lommen – drums

Production and additional personnel

- Peter Brötzmann – design
- Bruno Gebhard – production, recording
- Ingo Krauss – production, recording
- Dirk Rudolph – design
