= Caspar Brötzmann =

German guitarist

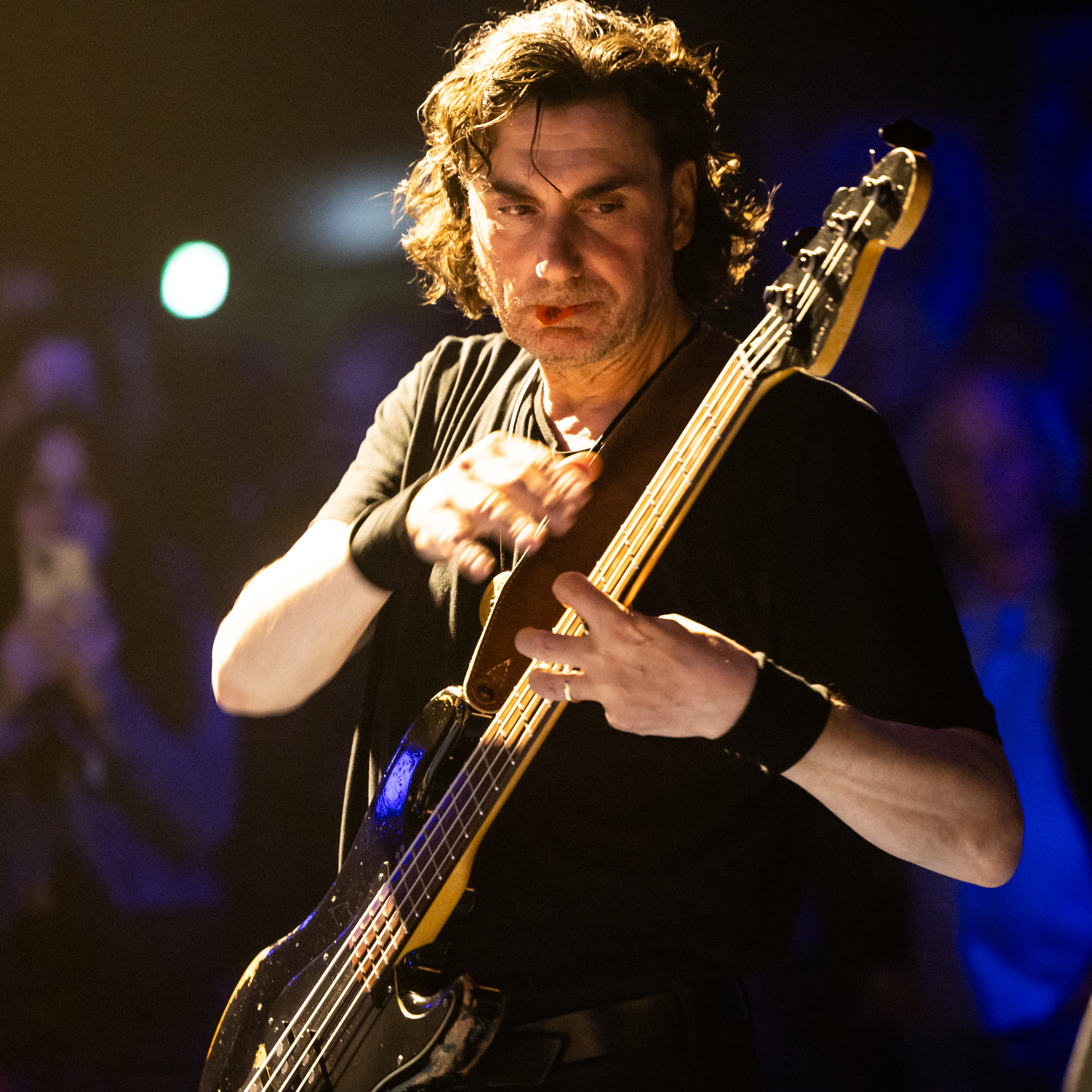
- Caspar Brötzmann at the Moers Festival, 2024

Background information
- Born: 13 December 1962 (age 63); Wuppertal, West Germany
- Genre: Rock
- Instruments: Guitar, vocals, bass
- Years active: 1986–present
- Labels: Blast First, Thirsty Ear Recordings, Marat Records, Our Choice, Big Cat, Sub Rosa
- Website: casparbroetzmannmassaker.com

Caspar Brötzmann (born 13 December 1962) is a German guitarist, vocalist and bandleader.

Brötzmann typically performs with the power trio lineup of Caspar Brötzmann Massaker (his early band), with guitar, bass guitar and drums. He uses rock and roll and heavy metal music as a basis for his music, which often features lengthy songs that start slow and quiet but gradually build to a ferocious climax. Brötzmann's technique has been praised: "...his attack on the instrument — explosive, obstreperous, large scale, textural, timbral — asserts the material facts of string-pickup-amplifier more bluntly than anyone else currently involved in rock".

Brötzmann's father, Peter Brötzmann, was a free jazz saxophone player. In 1990 they recorded the album Last Home as a duo.

== Discography ==
Caspar Brötzmann Massaker

- The Tribe (1987)
- Black Axis (May 1989)
- Der Abend der schwarzen Folklore (July 1992)
- Koksofen (June 1993)
- Home (January 1995)
- Mortar – various artists compilation (2014)
- It's A Love Song (2025)

Caspar Brötzmann & Peter Brötzmann

- Last Home (1990) – with Peter Brötzmann.

Caspar Brötzmann & FM Einheit

- Merry Christmas (April 1994) – with F.M. Einheit of Einstürzende Neubauten.

Caspar Brötzmann & Page Hamilton

- Zulutime (November 1996) – with Page Hamilton, of the band Helmet.

Caspar Brötzmann

- Mute Massaker (June 1999)

Other activity

- Die Alliierten – Ruhm und Ehre (1982) – Skinhead band from Wuppertal, Germany; Caspar Brötzmann plays guitar
- The März Combo – Live in Wuppertal (April 1993) – Live recording of the Peter Brötzmann Tentet
- Guitar on Thomas D's (of Die Fantastischen Vier) album Reflektor Falke (2001). Also guitarist on the accompanying tour.
- Ende Gut – Ein Klangwerk (July 2005) – Sibylle Berg reads, Caspar Brötzmann plays guitar
- Live music (guitar) for dance performance Execution Ground, Premiere 24 March 2007 at the Kunsthaus Rhenania, Cologne.
