= Zulutime =

Studio album by Caspar Brötzmann/Page Hamilton
- Released: November 1996
- Recorded: October 1995
- Studio: Fun City Studio (Manhattan, New York)
- Genre: Noise rock
- Length: 47:56
- Label: Atavistic
- Producer: Caspar Brötzmann; Page Hamilton; Bruno Gebhard; Wharton Tiers

Caspar Brötzmann chronology
Home (1995)	Zulutime (1996)	Mute Massaker (1999)

Professional ratings
Review scores
Source	Rating
AllMusic	4/5 stars
Alternative Press	3/5 stars

Zulutime is an album by guitarists Caspar Brötzmann and Page Hamilton, released in November 1996 through Atavistic Records.

== Track listing ==
All music is composed by Caspar Brötzmann and Page Hamilton.

No.	Title	Length
1.	"Zulutime"	11:14
2.	"Head Hunter"	7:18
3.	"Hit Single"	11:30
4.	"Dream Date"	7:43
5.	"Suburban Blight"	5:56
6.	"Imbiss"	4:15

== Accolades ==
Year	Publication	Country	Accolade	Rank
1996	The Wire	United Kingdom	"Albums of the Year"	31

== Personnel ==
Musicians

- Caspar Brötzmann – guitar, production
- Page Hamilton – guitar, production

Production and additional personnel

- Bruno Gebhard – production
- Wharton Tiers – production
