= Atlantis (role-playing game) =

- The Arcanum, 1st book of The Atlantean Trilogy
- Designers: Stephan Michael Sechi, Vernie Taylor, Steven Cordovano, J. Andrew Keith
- Publishers: Bard Games; Death's Edge Games; ZiLa Games; Khepera Publishing
- Publication: 1984 (1st edition); 1985 (2nd edition); 1996 (3rd edition); 2014 (Second Age); 2019 (30th Anniversary Edition)
- Genres: Historical fantasy; Sword and Sorcery
- Systems: Custom, Omni System

Atlantis is a fantasy role-playing game (RPG) originally published by Bard Games, set in the ancient world before Atlantis sank. It first consisted of three books: The Arcanum, The Lexicon, and The Bestiary, and for this reason was originally called The Atlantean Trilogy or The Atlantis Trilogy.

Atlantis was one of the many fantasy RPGs that followed the rise of the popular Dungeons & Dragons RPG in the late 1970s. However, instead of featuring a fictional fantasy world such as D&D's Greyhawk or RuneQuest's Glorantha, Atlantis is based on a pseudo-historical version of the Earth and features historical mythology and creatures from myth.

== Setting ==
The world setting is Earth, but in a fictionalized Antediluvian Age (a quasi-historical/mythical interpretation of the ancient past).

=== Geography ===
The geographic regions and real-world influences are:

- Mediterranea (Europe)
- Eria (North America)
- Tamoanchan (South America)
- Turan (Arabia)
- Gondwana (Africa)
- Jambu (Asia)
- the Nether Realm (Antarctica)
- Anostos and Jotunland (Iceland and Greenland).

Mythical continents are also added:

- Atlantia (Atlantis),
- Antilla,
- Hyperborea
- Lemuria
- Mu
- and others

== Publication history ==
In the 1980s a group of friends — Vernie Taylor, Steven Cordovano, and Stephan Michael Sechi — who played a highly customized version of Dungeons & Dragons with new, specialized character classes and magic spells, decided to publish their improvements to the game. Each of them put up $600 to form Bard Games.

=== The Compleat Series ===
In 1983 the new company published three books known as the "Compleat Series": The Compleat Adventurer by Sechi, The Compleat Spell Caster by Taylor and Sechi, and The Compleat Alchemist by Cordovano and Sechi. No specific role-playing system rules were mentioned, the unwritten assumption being that players would use the popular Dungeons & Dragons rules.

=== First edition: The Atlantean Trilogy ===
The following year, the books of The Compleat Series were combined with a new role-playing system into one central rulebook, The Arcanum, a 156-page softcover book by Sechi and Taylor. This was followed in 1985 by The Lexicon, a 128-page softcover book by Sechi, Taylor and Ed Mortimer that provided the setting, and The Bestiary in 1986, a 132-page softcover book written by Sechi and J. Andrew Keith that provided the creatures. As a result, the role-playing game became known as The Atlantean Trilogy; later versions with fewer than three books were simply titled Atlantis.

Sechi would go on to produce the role-playing game Talislanta, also published by Bard Games in 1987.

In the 2014 book Designer & Dragons: The '80s, game historian Shannon Appelcline wrote that "Because of the success of their Compleat books, Bard Games decided to combine the best information from those supplements within a game system and a setting. The result — which would become known as "The Atlantis Trilogy" — would really put Bard on the map. Stephan Michael Sechi oversaw this new and daunting project — which took three years to complete. Eventually he produced three books: The Arcanum (1984), The Lexicon (1985), and The Bestiary (1986). The system was clearly derivative of D&D, but it also introduced character skills and point-based character creation. The setting was a bit more unique, as it portrayed an antediluvian world of myth (though it also contained some off-key elements including typical fantasy races of D&D and even druids). Some players embraced the new game as a more complex D&D with a uniquely textured setting."

=== Second edition: Atlantis ===
A second edition of The Arcanum was published in 1985 with revised and updated rules. Three years later, Bard Press combined The Lexicon and The Bestiary into a single book, Atlantis: The Lost World.

=== Third edition: Atlantis ===
In 1996, Death's Edge Games released a third edition, largely based on the second edition, with the addition of a new race, the Selkie.

=== Atlantis: The Second Age ===
In 2005, Khepera Publishing released Atlantis: The Second Age replacing Bard Game's original role-playing rules with Morrigan Press's Omni System.

In 2014, Khepera Publishing released a newer and updated version via kickstarter for Atlantis: The Second Age 2e using a different System : Omega System.

=== 30th anniversary edition ===
In 2012, K. David Ladage purchased the rights to The Arcanum, but not the rights to The Lexicon and The Bestiary, which were still held by Khepera Publishing. The following year, doing business as ZiLa Games, Ladage ran a Kickstarter to re-release The Arcanum in a new, cleaned up and re-edited form. However, when ZiLa was unable to deliver after three years, all backers were reimbursed their entire pledge. In 2017, he ran a second Kickstarter to re-release The Arcanum and both a PDF of the book and the book itself were delivered in 2019.

== Reception ==
In the December 1986 edition of White Dwarf (Issue #85), Phil Frances reviewed all three books of the original edition of The Atlantean Trilogy, and noted the similarities to Dungeon & Dragons, commenting "I found myself playing Spot the D&D Equivalent — a game not mentioned in the book. It sure whiffs of That Game a lot [...] It's pretty obvious from the start which game this was primaririly intended for." He concluded that The Arcanum was probably not an essential buy for more experienced gamers, saying, "You can get by without this if you already own a roleplaying game; if not, its a solid starting base." Frances had good things to say about both The Lexicon — "oodles of pretty maps" — and The Bestiary — "my favourite because of the illustrations by Bill Sienkiewicz (of Marvel Comics)."

In his 1990 book The Complete Guide to Role-Playing Games, game critic Rick Swan called this game "a winner" but pointed out that "As a game it's adequate, but nothing special. As a supplement [to another role-playing game such as Dungeons & Dragons] Arcanum is unsurpassed, easily one of the best treatments of magic ever published." Swan concluded by giving the game a rating of 3 out of 4, saying, "For those interested in expanding the magic systems of other fantasy RPGs, Arcanum serves as an excellent source of ideas."
