= Tribal class =

Tribal class can refer to several classes of warship:

- Tribal-class destroyer (1905) or F class, 12 destroyers built for the Royal Navy during the early 1900s and operating during World War I
- Tribal-class destroyer (1936) or Afridi class, 27 destroyers built for the navies of the United Kingdom, Canada, and Australia that served during World War II
- Tribal-class frigate or Type 81, seven frigates built for the Royal Navy during the late 1950s and early 1960s, four of which were later operated by the Indonesian Navy
- General Purpose Frigate, a cancelled Canadian procurement project of the 1960s also called the "Tribal-class frigate"
- Iroquois-class destroyer or Tribal class, four vessels built for the Canadian Forces in the early 1970s
