= CoastCon =

Science fiction convention series in Mississippi

Coordinates: 30.395383°N 88.975162°W

- Status: Active
- Genre: Multi-genre
- Venue: Mississippi Coast Coliseum and Convention Center
- Locations: Biloxi, Mississippi
- Country: United States
- Inaugurated: 1977
- Attendance: 1200+
- Filing status: Not-for-profit
- Website: http://www.coastcon.org

CoastCon is Mississippi's longest running and one of its largest science fiction, fantasy, and gaming convention expos. It is the main sponsored event of CoastCon, Inc., a not-for-profit literary organization. CoastCon, Inc. and its ten-member volunteer board develop events and gatherings to promote reading, education, and fellowship, in all the genres and formats of science fiction, science fact, fantasy, and gaming across the Southern United States, for over forty-seven years. The next CoastCon annual convention, CoastCon 48, will be held March 6-8, 2026, at the Mississippi Coast Coliseum and Convention Center in Biloxi, Mississippi.

== Events ==
Besides one of the largest genre-themed vendor's rooms in the state, an art show and auction, a charity auction, and Saturday costume contest and evening dance party, each year members and attendees of CoastCon can participate in three days of events including over 72 hours of panels, seminars, demonstrations, and workshops on topics that include activities on writing, art, anime, gaming, science fiction and fantasy literature, comic books, costuming, hard science, online media, fandom, genre film and television, table-top, card and miniatures gaming, robotics, and filk, to name only a few.

== Guests ==
CoastCon brings guests to its convention each year. CoastCon past guests include stars of many areas of interest to fandom. A short list of past guests include (in no particular order): actress Nicki Clyne, author David Drake, author David Weber, artist John Picacio, actress Virginia Hey, actress Gigi Edgley, actor Peter Mayhew, game designer Mike Mearls, author Michael Moorcock, actor Peter Jurasik, actor/producer James Cawley, author Deborah LeBlanc, author Sharon Green, actress Noel Neill, and game designer Dave Arneson.

== Charity ==
Each year the convention's parent organization chooses to support a charity that aligns with the convention's goals. For 2026 CoastCon Inc. has chosen CASA of Harrison & Stone Counties as its main charity.
