= The Tribe (album) =

Studio album by Caspar Brötzmann Massaker
- Released: 1987
- Recorded: August 1987 at FMP Studio, Berlin, Germany
- Genre: Noise rock
- Length: 42:05
- Label: Zensor
- Producer: Caspar Brötzmann

Caspar Brötzmann chronology
| The Tribe (1987) | Black Axis (1989) |

The Tribe is the debut album by Caspar Brötzmann Massaker. It was released in 1987 through Zensor. In 2019, the album was reissued by Southern Lord.

== Reception ==
Grayson Haver Currin of Pitchfork called the album "an unapologetic offering of new possibilities in rock—punk in spirit if not in sound, free in feeling if not in execution," and wrote: "Brötzmann and his rhythm section wield the spare parts of rock'n'roll like weapons of collective liberation, lashing back against the very torment they've created."

A reviewer for Freq commented: "there is a single-minded intensity to the album makes it stand it out — plus the fact that what else was happening in Germany at the time? Were there any like minds ploughing these kinds of furrows?" They continued: "It is when the guitar explodes into scorching abuse that his vision becomes apparent, as it sounds as though the instrument is alive and he is trying to throttle it as it fights back with every ounce of energy."

Writing for The Quietus, Spyros Stasis stated: "From their very first album it felt like Massaker had hit the nail directly on the head. The mystical and ritualistic procession of the title track introduced The Tribe to the world, and from that point on it was a complete annihilation."

Fear and Loathing's Andy Pearson remarked: "Caspar created his own style of sonic manipulation and placed it within the format of a power trio, allowing plenty of room for experimentation whilst ensuring the music could be as powerful as was needed... With so many bands currently exploring the outer-reaches of hard rock, it's remarkable that this album still sounds so different and remains so valid. This is one that you simply have to hear."

== Track listing ==
All tracks are written by Caspar Brötzmann, except "The Tribe" and "Blechton" by Jon Beuth

Side one
| No. | Title | Length |
|---|---|---|
| 1. | "The Tribe" | 4:56 |
| 2. | "Blechton" | 4:22 |
| 3. | "Massaker" | 8:39 |
| 4. | "Heavens Gate" | 3:20 |

Side two
| No. | Title | Length |
|---|---|---|
| 1. | "The Call" | 4:57 |
| 2. | "Time" | 7:18 |
| 3. | "Paul" | 3:46 |
| 4. | "Bonkers Dance" | 4:47 |

== Personnel ==
Musicians

- Jon Beuth – drums
- Caspar Brötzmann – guitar, vocals, production
- Eduardo Delgado-Lopez – bass guitar, vocals

Production and additional personnel

- Winnie Blobel – photography
- Peter Brötzmann – illustrations
- Jost Gebers – recording
- Andreas Hilbig – mixing
