= Talislanta =

Fantasy role-playing game

- 2nd edition of Talislanta and Campaign Guide, cover art by P.D. Breeding-Black.
- Designers: Stephen Michael Sechi, Jonathan Tweet (3rd edition), John Harper (4th edition), K. Scott Agnew (5th edition), Christopher Batarlis (Epic Edition / 6th edition)
- Publishers: Bard Games, Everything Epic Wizards of the Coast, Shooting Iron, Morrigan Press, Ludopathes Éditeurs (French)
- Publication: 1987 (1st edition); 1988 (2nd edition); 1992 (3rd edition); 2001 (4th edition); 2005 (d20 edition); 2006-2007 (5th edition); 2023-2024 (6th edition)
- Genres: Fantasy
- Systems: Custom, Omni System (d20 based)

Talislanta is a fantasy role-playing game set in a world of its own. It was originally published by Bard Games in 1987 and has seen seven English-language editions through 2024. Several foreign editions have also been published.

== Contents ==
=== Setting ===
The game is set in Talislanta, a continent on the world of Archaeus. Magic is common and has reached a high level of technology.

=== Character creation ===
In the 1st to 4th editions, characters are essentially pre-generated, with over 80 character types defined by race, nationality, ability scores, skills, equipment and background. Players pick the type of character they wish to play, then individualize it by increasing one ability by three points; decreasing one ability by one point; and adding an additional skill. PD Breeding-Black was the first artist to work on Talislanta, and was instrumental in creating the look and feel of the First and Second Edition books. Her artwork was integral in establishing the look of Talislanta, and it remains so to the present day.

In the 5th edition, a more complex character generation system was introduced that was similar to other role-playing games.

=== Task resolution ===
All task resolution, whether for combat, magic or skills/attributes, is resolved on a single table using a twenty-sided die. Five results are possible: Mishap, Failure, Partial Success, Full Success or Critical Success. The difference between the result gained and the rated difficulty of the task indicates how much of a success or failure was achieved.

== Publishing history ==
=== 1987 1st edition (Bard Games) ===
In 1982 Stephan Michael Sechi, Steven Cordovano and Vernie Taylor formed the company Bard Games to produce their own Dungeons & Dragons supplements. In 1986, due to personal and financial disagreements that arose after the publication of The Atlantis Trilogy, Sechi sold his shares in Bard Games to Cordovano and left to begin work on a new role-playing game system and its supplements. Cordovano decided that he did not want to run Bard Games and sold it back to Sechi, giving Sechi the opportunity to publish his new game, Talislanta. Sechi pointed to the Dying Earth fantasy novel series by Jack Vance as the primary influence, but there are many other sources of inspiration as well, including H. P. Lovecraft’s Dreamquest of Unknown Kadath, Marco Polo’s Travels, and Sir Richard Burton’s collection of the Arabian Nights. As game critic Rick Swan stated, "It's as if H. P. Lovecraft had written Alice in Wonderland, with Hans Christian Andersen and William S. Burroughs as technical advisors."

After publication of the rules in The Talislantan Handbook in 1987, Sechi also published three supplements: The Chronicles of Talislanta, A Naturalist's Guide to Talislanta, and Talislanta Sorcerer's Guide.

=== 1988 2nd edition (Bard Games) ===
In 1988, Bard Games published a second edition of Talislanta starting with The Cyclopedia Talislanta. This 88-page softcover book included continental and local maps; a listing of urban centers and important geographical features; and expanded list of flora and fauna; new character types; new types of transportation; and variant rules.

In 1989, Bard Games released Talislanta Handbook and Campaign Guide, a 152-page softcover book that combined The Talislatan Handbook and material from the three supplements. The book included:

- Rules revisions for combat, magic, skills, and attributes
- New rules for mass combat rules
- Expanded listings of skills, equipment, weapons, and transportation
- A map of the City of Cymril
- A new introductory adventure.
- New character backgrounds
- Optional combat rules
- Details of languages, currencies, and Talislantan chronology

In 1990, Bard Games published Talislanta Worldbook, a 183-page atlas of the world of Archaeus and the continent of Talislanta. Shortly after publication, Bard Games went out of business.

=== 1992 3rd edition (Wizards of the Coast) ===
In 1992, Wizards of the Coast (WotC)—at the time a new, small, and relatively unknown company—acquired the license to Talislanta Original designer Stephen Michael Sechi collaborated with Jonathan Tweet to produce the third edition rules that included:

- The Talislanta Guidebook (1992). In the 344-page softcover book the history of Talislanta was moved forward by twenty years, and the magic system was completely revised.
- Talislanta Geographica (1992) was a 16-page softcover book containing a referee's screen, a poster map of the continent of Talislanta, and various types of geographical information, including wind and water currents, major conflicts, and four adventure outlines. The map text was written by Peter Adkison and George Lowe, and the adventures were written by Jeff Goldman and George Lowe.
- The Archaen Codex (1992), a 180-page softcover book by Stephen Michael Sechi, was an update on variant magic rules, including spells, skills, magic items and books.
- Thystram's Collectanea (1993), a 150-page softcover book by Stephen Michael Sechi, was an updated bestiary, containing details of all known flora and fauna.
- The Scent of the Beast (1992), by Jonathan Tweet, the first full-length Talislanta adventure
- Quantrigue (1993), by Stephen Michael Sechi and Tony Herring, another full length adventure
- Sarista (1994), a 72-page book by Mike McDonald and Peter Adkison about the nomadic people known as the Sarista.

WotC's final Talislanta book was the full-length campaign Sub-Men Rising (1994) by Robin Laws. In an announcement printed on the last page, WotC announced that this would be "the last Talislanta book from Wizards of the Coast"; Talislanta products would now be published by Daedalus Entertainment, a small Canadian company that had produced the game Feng Shui. However, Daedalus went out of business before its version was published.

=== Failed 10th anniversary edition (Pharos Press) ===
In 1997, Pharos Press acquired the license to Talislanta in order to produce a new edition of the game in time for the tenth anniversary of Talislanta. Pharos had an ambitious plan to expand and revise all previously published material, then combine it one book. Plagued by production delays, Pharos got as far as producing a few ashcans, but failed to publish a product by the end of the year. Because they had missed the tenth anniversary, trademark holder Stephen Michael Sechi rescinded their license.

=== 2001 4th edition (Shooting Iron and Morrigan Press) ===
A small company called Shooting Iron acquired the license and in 2001 produced Talislanta Fantasy Role-playing, a 502-page 4th edition that was largely based on the never-published Pharos Press 10th anniversary edition. Shooting Iron also published the supplement Midnight Realm in 2005, a 152-page book detailing the plane of existence known as The Darkness, but then relinquished the license.

Morrigan Press acquired the license to Talislanta and published the following supplements under Shooting Iron's 4th edition rules:

- Talislanta Menagerie (2005), an updated bestiary
- Codex Magicus (2005), an updated magic system
- The Northern Reaches (2005), an exploration of the arctic regions of Talislanta
- The Weight of Water (2005), a 64-page adventure
- The Chronicles of Talislanta (2005), a revised and updated version of the book originally published under 1st edition rules in 1987
- The Darkness (2005), a revised edition of Shooting Iron's Midnight Realm
- Talislanta Cardstock Minis (2005), 13 pages of illustrations of popular character types that could be cut out and used as miniatures
- People & Places: Djaffa (2006), details of the nomadic desert tribes known as the Djaffa.
- Riding the Sky (2006), a book about windsailors

=== 2005 d20 edition (no edition number) ===
In 2005, Morrigan Press released Talislanta d20 Edition, a new version adapted to the d20 System.

=== 2006-2007 5th edition (Morrigan Press) ===
In 2006, Morrigan Press announced the upcoming release of a fifth edition that revised the magic system slightly and provided a variant character generation system. Over the next year, four books were released:

- Hotan's History of the World (2006), a revised and expanded overview of the geography, peoples and major urban centers of Talislanta.
- The Menagerie (2007), an updated bestiary that includes all creatures from previous editions.
- A Player's Guide to Talislanta (2007) includes the new 5th edition rules for combat, magic, character generation.
- A Gamemaster's Guide to Talislanta(2007) includes new rule variants, new races, and new magic orders.

In 2008, Morrigan Press went out of business.

=== 2019 The Savage Land ===
Launched in a successful Kickstarter campaign by Nocturnal Media in 2017, Talislanta: The Savage Land was released starting in 2018 to backers and 2019 for the rest of the world. Instead of taking place in the classic game's time, this prequel game takes place shortly after The Great Disaster, referred by the Savage Land denizens as "The Fall". Three rule versions of the game were completed and released: one based on the classic Talislanta rules, one released under the 5th Edition D&D OGL, and one using the OpenD6 system. The setting is low-magic due to the loss of magical knowledge and the survivors' prejudice against magic.

=== 2023-2024 Epic Edition (Everything Epic) ===
In 2023 and 2024, after a successful crowdfunding campaign, Everything Epic published Talislanta Epic Edition or "6th and Final Edition".

- Talislanta Player's Guide: Full game rules as well as player character archetypes, items, skills and spells.
- Talislanta Bestiary: Hundreds of monsters selected as the most important ones for the world.
- Talislanta Atlas & GM's Guide: Describes the most important locations of Talislanta as well as important lore and random encounter tables.
- Talislanta 5e Conversion: Archetype and monster game mechanics needed to play with 5e rules in the world of Talislanta.

=== Translations ===
Talislanta has been translated into several languages, including Italian (1997), German (1991–1992) and French (2005–present). The French edition, published by Ludopathes Éditeurs, is based on the 4th edition rules by Shooting Iron, and has resulted in seven books and seven PDFs.

== Reception ==
Stewart Wieck reviewed Talislanta for White Wolf #11, rating it 9 out of 10 overall, and stated that "The true strength of Talislanta is its uniqueness. Here is a fantasy world without orcs and goblins and all those "standard" enemies [...] I highly recommend this world as a place where your imagination can run wild."

In the March 1989 edition of Dragon (Issue #143), Jim Bambra called Talislanta "something out of the ordinary". Bambra found the art "visually appealing, and does an excellent job of conveying the atmosphere, places, and peoples of Talislanta. A flick through any of the four books reveals that Talislanta is special." He concluded, "Some may find the Talislantan game system thin on rules and mechanics, but it does an admirable job of handling all kinds of tests without interrupting the flow of the game. With only a few rules to learn, you can concentrate on role-playing rather than rule-playing."

In his 1990 book The Complete Guide to Role-Playing Games, Rick Swan called the 1st edition "entertainingly written ... a model of clarity and elegance." Swan enjoyed the character creation system, noting that "Distinctive, enthralling characters can be created in a matter of minutes — it's an inspired system, one of the best of any fantasy RPG." The only flaw Swan found was a "lack of structure", wishing that more examples of play could have been given. Swan concluded by giving the game an excellent rating of 3.5 out of 4, saying, "For the adventurous, Talislanta is a role-playing nirvana."

Mark A. Santillo reviewed Talislanta Complete Roleplaying Game in White Wolf #33 (Sept./Oct., 1992), rating it a 4 out of 5 and stated that "The overall rating is high because of the tremendous creative effort that went into Talislanta, effort which is evident in the excellent artwork, imaginative archetypes, geographical features and fanciful beasts. Also, the system is truly easy to learn and use for both GM and players and places emphasis on role-playing and not numbers-crunching."

In his 2023 book Monsters, Aliens, and Holes in the Ground, RPG historian Stu Horvath called the game "a land of many regions, each unique in character. Some might call this tonal inconsistency, and that is true, to a degree, but the result is so varied and strange a world that it is easy to forgive its silly bits. How can a player be upset with a game that offers 84 types of characters right out of the gate?" Horvath concluded, "Talislanta is neither tidy nor gestalt. It never feels entirely cogent, and the tone is all over the place. What Talislanta is, though, is fresh, even 30-years later. The world jumps off the page."

== Reviews ==
- Black Gate #4
- Backstab #34

== Publications ==
- The Chronicles of Talislanta (1987)
- A Naturalist's Guide to Talislanta (1987)
- The Talislantan Handbook (1987)
- The Cyclopedia Talislanta (1988)
- Talislanta Cyclopedia (1988)
- Talislanta Sorcerer's Guide (1988)
- The Cyclopedia Talislanta II, The Seven Kingdoms (1989)
- The Cyclopedia Talislanta III, The Wilderlands of Zaran (1989)
- The Cyclopedia Talislanta IV, The Western Lands (1989)
- The Cyclopedia Talislanta V, The Eastern Lands (1989)
- Talislantan Handbook and Campaign Guide (1989)
- The Cyclopedia Talislanta VI, The Desert Kingdoms (1990)
- The Cyclopedia Talislanta VII, The Northlands (1990) (Never Released)
- The Cyclopedia Talislanta VIII, The Central Regions (1990) (Never Released)

== See also ==
- Tribes (supplement)
