= Sharon Green =

American writer

- Born: July 6, 1942; Brooklyn, New York, New York, United States
- Died: February 17, 2022 (aged 79); Roosevelt Care Center, Old Bridge, New Jersey
- Education: New York University (BA)
- Occupation: Novelist
- Children: 3
- Writing career
- Language: English
- Period: 1984–present
- Genres: Science fiction, fantasy, mystery, romance
- Website: www.sharon-green.net

Sharon Green (July 6, 1942 – February 17, 2022) was an American science fiction, fantasy, mystery, and romance author.

== Biography ==
Green was born in Brooklyn, New York in 1942 to Morris Green and Esther (née Bender) Green. She attended high school in Brooklyn and graduated with a B.A. degree from New York University in 1963.

Green married in 1963 and had three sons. In 1976, Green divorced her husband and raised her three sons, Andy, Brian and Curtis, as a single mother in Highland Park, New Jersey.

Green moved to Tennessee in 1993 and then to Florida in 2006. She moved to Old Bridge, New Jersey in 2020.

Green died at the Roosevelt Care Center on Thursday, February 17, 2022.

== Career ==
Green began writing in high school. She styled her early writings after her favorite writer, Robert A. Heinlein.

Before becoming a full-time author, she worked in several industries including as an AT&T shareowner correspondent, a construction assistant, then a bar steel assistant sales manager at an import firm.

Green began her full time writing career in 1984. Her early works were marketed as similar to John Norman's Gor series, but were actually intended as a rebuttal to Gor. Green said that she set out first to lampoon Norman's Gor books by creating three-dimensional female characters and powerful female characters in similar fantasy settings. Throughout her career she focused on writing strong female characters.

== Published works ==
This is a selected list of Green's published works.

Her website reissued some of her older out-of-print books and released several new unissued eBooks series.

=== The Blending series ===
1. Convergence: Book One of The Blending, Avon, November 1996
2. Competitions: Book Two of The Blending, Avon, March 1997
3. Challenges: Book Three of The Blending, Avon, May 1998
4. Betrayals: Book Four of The Blending, Avon, February 1999
5. Prophecy: Book Five of The Blending, Avon, July 1999

==== The Blending Enthroned series ====
1. Intrigues: Book One of The Blending Enthroned, Eos, October 3, 2000
2. Deceptions: Book Two of The Blending Enthroned, April 3, 2001
3. Destiny: Book Three of The Blending Enthroned, Eos, April 2, 2002

=== Diana Santee, Spaceways Agent series ===
Science fiction series with later sequels released directly on Green's website.

1. Mind Guest, DAW Books, 1984 (re-released online)
2. Gateway to Xanadu, DAW Books, 1985 (re-released online with newly restored scenes)

==== Online Sequels ====
1. Tanderon
2. Tristesse Book One
3. Tristesse Book Two
4. Esmonia
5. Xanthia
6. Aysanne
7. Tildor, CF Publications, 2008
8. Restin, CF Publications, 2008
9. Absar, CF Publications, 2008
10. Gralling
11. Durell

=== Far Side of Forever series ===
Fantasy series

1. The Far Side of Forever, DAW Books, 1987
2. Hellhound Magic, DAW Books, 1989

=== Hidden Realms series ===
Fantasy series

1. The Hidden Realms, Avon, 1993
2. Game's End, Avon, April, 1996

Also part of Silver Princess, Golden Knight series:

- Dark Mirror, Dark Dreams, Avon, 1994

=== Jalav: Amazon Warrior series ===
Science fiction series

1. The Crystals of Mida, DAW Books, 1982
2. An Oath to Mida, DAW Books, 1983
3. Chosen of Mida, DAW Books, 1984
4. The Will of the Gods, DAW Books, 1985
5. To Battle the Gods, DAW Books, 1986

=== Lady Blade, Lord Fighter series ===
Fantasy series released as a collection in 2001.

1. Lady Blade, Lord Fighter (or The Silver Bracers), DAW Books, 1987 (online out-of-print reissue)
2. The Argent Swords, Bereshith Publishing, 2001 (online out-of-print reissue)

Lady Blade, Lord Fighter, Bereshith Publishing, 2001 (hardbound collector's edition)

=== Lawman series ===
Direct-to-eBook releases through Green's website.

1. Lawman
2. Lawman2

=== Mind Warriors series ===
Terrilian series sequels (direct-to-eBook releases through Green's website)

1. Arrival
2. Enemies
3. Battles
4. Tactics
5. War
6. Peace
7. Serenity
8. Onward

=== Silver Princess, Golden Knight series ===
Fantasy series

1. Silver Princess, Golden Knight, Avon, 1993 (out-of-print novel reissued online)
2. Wind Whispers, Shadow Shouts, Avon, July 1995

Also part of Hidden Realms series:

- Dark Mirror, Dark Dreams, Avon, 1994

=== Taz/Bell series ===
Direct-to-eBook releases through Green's website.

1. Dead Heat
2. Dark Horse
3. Down and Dirty
4. Down and Dirty Part 2
5. Double Trouble

=== Terrilian series ===
Science fiction series

1. The Warrior Within, DAW Books, 1982 (out-of-print novel reissued online)
2. The Warrior Enchained, DAW Books, 1983 (out-of-print novel reissued online)
3. The Warrior Rearmed, DAW Books, 1984 (out-of-print novel reissued online)
4. The Warrior Challenged, DAW Books, 1986 (out-of-print novel reissued online)
5. The Warrior Victorious, DAW Books, 1987 (out-of-print novel reissued online)

=== The Thief and the Warrior series ===
Science fiction series

1. Mists of the Ages, DAW Books, 1988

=== Standalone novels ===
Title	Publication Date	Publisher	Genres	Comments
Rebel Prince	1986	DAW Books	Science Fiction	Re-released online
Dawn Song	1990	Avon	Fantasy	Out-of-print novel reissued online
Haunted House	1990	Harlequin	Mystery, Romance	Harlequin Intrigues series (out-of-print novel reissued online)
Werewolf Moon	1993	Harlequin	Mystery, Romance	Harlequin Intrigues series (re-released online)
Fantasy Man	1993	Harlequin	Mystery, Romance	Harlequin Intrigues series
Flame of Fury	1993	Avon	Historical Fiction, Romance	Out-of-print novel reissued online
Enchanting	1994	Pinnacle	Fantasy, Romance	
Silken Dreams	1994	Avon	Historical Fiction, Romance	Out-of-print novel reissued online
To Die For!	December 2000	Harlequin	Mystery, Romance	Harlequin Intrigues series
Haughty Spirit	2000		Historical Fiction, Romance	
The Gambler	2007	CF Publications		
Midnight Madness			Mystery, Romance	Out-of-print novel reissued online
Shadowborn: Captivity				Online release
Sweet Dreams				Online release
Freedom				Online release

=== Short stories ===
Title	Publication Date	Collection
A Quiet Day at the Fair	1986	Magic in Ithkar 4, Tor
Vision of Honor	April 1987	Friends of the Horseclans, Signet
And the Truth Shall Set You Free	May 1989	Alternatives, Baen
Damnation	March 1989	Friends of the Horseclans II, Signet
The Fear-Beast	March 1989	Friends of the Horseclans II, Signet
The Root of All Evil	1990	Tales of the Witch World 3, Tor
