= Tribes (supplement) =

Tribes is a series of role-playing game supplements published by Heathen Thorn Enterprises.

== Gameplay ==
Tribes is a series of compact, black-and-white, photocopied booklets—each 14 to 19 pages long—designed to expand a fantasy campaign with regional content set in the eastern realms of the world of Oth. These installments explore the lands of Karak (the Branded Land), Kikeb (the Savage Land), Dark Farl (Land of Horror), and the Hinterlands of Eastern Oth. Each booklet features a detailed map, background lore, Gamemaster notes including creature statistics, and seeds for adventure development. The inhabitants of Oth fall into four main classifications: humans, subhumans, Umans, and Sull. Due to the region's rugged geography, its peoples have developed in relative isolation, leading to diverse cultures. These cultural profiles are designed for integration into fantasy campaigns.

== Reception ==
Stewart Wieck reviewed Tribes in White Wolf #22 (Aug./Sept., 1990), rating it a 4 out of 5 and stated that "In the same way that Bard Games created a unique world with Talislanta, Heathen Thorn has succeeded in creating a variety of diverse mythologies and belief systems for the people of Eastern Oth."
