= The Compleat Adventurer =

1983 role-playing game supplement

The Compleat Adventurer is a 1983 role-playing game supplement written by Stephan Michael Sechi and published by Bard Games.

== Contents ==
The Compleat Adventurer is a collection of character classes intended to be used for fantasy roleplaying games. The book presented variant classes for thieves and fighters, such as bounty hunters, buccaneers, spies, and witch-hunters.

== Reception ==
Craig Sheeley reviewed The Compleat Adventurer in Space Gamer No. 72. Sheeley commented that "The Compleat Adventurer is rather expensive for the information therein, though the thirteen character classes are quite good and very workable."
