= The Compleat Spell Caster =

Tabletop role-playing game supplement

The Compleat Spell Caster is a 1983 role-playing game supplement for published by Bard Games.

== Contents ==
The Compleat Spell Caster is a supplement intended to add new material to the magic systems existing in fantasy roleplaying games. The book offered variant classes for magic-users, such as mystics, necromancers, sorcerers and witches.

== Reception ==
Craig Sheeley reviewed The Compleat Spell Caster in Space Gamer No. 72. Sheeley commented that "Unfortunately, The Compleat Spell Caster won't much help people playing Chivalry & Sorcery, and would only add confusion to AD&D. These games already have quite complete magic systems. Only a game with a small magic system would benefit."
