= The Compleat Alchemist =

Role-playing game supplement

The Compleat Alchemist is a generic role-playing game supplement first published by Bard Games in 1982.

== Publication history ==
Bard Games was formed in 1982 by Steven Cordovano and Stephan Michael Sechi to market generic fantasy role-playing supplements that could be adapted for any game system. Their first product was a 46-page softcover book called The Compleat Alchemist. A preliminary edition with a white cover and brown cover art was published in 1982; the first edition with pink cover art was released the following year. In both cases, the contents were typewritten, and artwork was provided by Joe Bouza.

Bard Games ceased operation in 1990. In 1994, Wizards of the Coast released an updated edition of The Compleat Alchemist, a 71-page professionally typeset softcover book written by Cathleen Adkinson, Anthony Pryor, and Beverly Marshall Saling.

== Description ==
The book provides details on the alchemist character class. Its contents are designed to be modified for use with any fantasy role-playing game system. Alchemical processes are described in detail, including more than 200 ingredients and their cost.

The first edition book is divided into four parts:

1. Introduction: an outline of alchemy and basics about the alchemist character
2. Ingredients, including herbs, elements, gemstones, animal parts, equipment needed and a log sheet
3. Twelve levels of alchemical processes, from Elixirs and Toxic Powders at the low end, to the philosopher's stone, golems and homunculi at the highest levels.
4. Gamemaster notes, including details of buying and selling, hirelings, apprentices, and an explosion table

== Reception ==
Martin Wixted reviewed The Compleat Alchemist for Different Worlds magazine and stated that "Perhaps the designers might consider reworking the supplement, or putting forth another version compatible with other system. Until then, The Complete Alchemist must be relegated to just another D&D character class. Something it does not deserve."

In the January–February 1985 edition of Space Gamer (Issue No. 72), Craig Sheeley was not sure if the average player should buy the 1983 edition, commenting that, "The Compleat Alchemist is a worthy supplement, but if you don't think you'll ever have an alchemist player-character in your game, and you already have enough magical items and don't want to add any more, then this supplement is not for you."

Gene Alloway reviewed The Compleat Alchemist, 2nd Edition in White Wolf #39 (1994), rating it a 4 out of 5 and stated that "Though The Complete Alchemist has no charts for translating specific information to game systems, you should having no problem doing so yourself. I'm always impressed with Wizards of the Coast's ability to create useful cross-genre products."

In the June 1994 edition of Dragon (Issue 206), Rick Swan found some of the statistics hopelessly vague, due to the attempt to keep the information as generic as possible: "To accommodate everything from AD&D game to the Tunnels & Trolls game, the rules have to be vague. Consequently, I'm not always sure what they mean." Swan also was troubled by the lack of role-playing material, saying, "There's little about the alchemist's personality, no meaningful adventure hooks, no compelling reasons why alchemists would be more fun to play than, say, a priest or a paladin." He concluded by giving the book an average rating of 3 out of 6, saying that few players would likely play an alchemist, but that "referees should find The Compleat Alchemist to be an invaluable resource for adding color to their campaigns and creating oddball treasure items. Ghoul venom, anyone?"

== Reviews ==
- The V.I.P. of Gaming Magazine #4 (July/Aug., 1986)
