= Stephan Michael Sechi =

American game designer

- Occupation: Game designer

Stephan Michael Sechi is a game designer who has worked primarily on role-playing games.

== Career ==
Stephan Michael Sechi, Steven Cordovano and Vernie Taylor contributed $600 each to form the company Bard Games in 1982 to produce supplements for Dungeons & Dragons.

Sechi and Cordovano wrote The Compleat Alchemist (1983) which was the first product the company published, and presented a magic-item maker character class. Sechi then wrote The Compleat Adventurer (1983) which included multiple class variants for thief and fighter characters, while Sechi and Taylor wrote The Compleat Spell Caster (1983) which included many class variants for magic-user characters. Sechi oversaw The Atlantis Trilogy, the next project for Bard Games, which was completed after three years with the three books released as The Arcanum (1984), The Lexicon (1985), and The Bestiary (1986).

Sechi sold his Bard Games shares to Cordovano and left over personal and financial disagreements that came about after The Atlantis Trilogy was completed. Sechi worked on another supplement trilogy over the next three months that would comprise a new role-playing game; Cordovano did not really want to run Bard Games so he sold the company back to Sechi, who used the publishing house for his new game which he called Talislanta (1987) . Sechi used the success of Talislanta to collect his Atlantis material and publish the setting in the sourcebook Atlantis: The Lost World (1988) and then published a second edition of Talislanta with the Talislanta Handbook & Campaign Guide (1989). Sechi was hesitant regarding a huge order that a Waldenbooks buyer placed on Atlantis: The Lost World, although Sechi eventually did fill it; roughly a year later Waldenbooks returned many of the books and Bard Games was forced to refund approximately $20,000. Sechi repaid his debts for the returned books, paid up his partner, and then shut Bard Games down in 1990. Sechi retained control of the properties of Bard Games, and licensed the rights over the years to Wizards of the Coast, Death's Edge Games, Daedalus Entertainment, and Pharos Press.

Sechi licensed Talislanta to Morrigan Press in 2005 along with the rights to Atlantis supplements The Lexicon and The Besitary. Sechi placed the whole Talislanta books corpus under a Creative Commons license in 2010.
