= Steven Cordovano =

American game designer

- Occupation: Game designer

Steven Cordovano is a game designer who has worked primarily on role-playing games.

== Career ==
Stephan Michael Sechi, Steven Cordovano and Venie Taylor each contributed $600 and formed the company Bard Games in 1982 with the intention to publish their own Dungeons & Dragons supplements. Sechi and Cordovano wrote The Compleat Alchemist (1983) was became the first product from the company and detailed a new character class which makes magic items. After personal and financial disagreements while he completed The Atlantis Trilogy, Sechi sold his shares in Bard Games to Cordovano and left the company. Cordovano did not want to run the company and sold Bard Games back to Sechi a few months later.
