= Bard Games =

Game publisher

Bard Games was an American game company that produced role-playing games and game supplements.

== Products ==
Bard Games was formed in 1982 by Steven Cordovano, Vernie Taylor and Stephan Michael Sechi, who each put up $600. Their intention was to market generic fantasy role-playing supplements that could be adapted for any game system. Their first product was The Compleat Alchemist.

In 1984, Bard Games published the fantasy role-playing game (RPG) Atlantis. Over the next three years, two more Atlantis volumes were published, creating The Atlantis Trilogy. Due to personal and financial disagreements that arose in the wake of the trilogy, Sechi sold his shares in Bard Games to Cordovano and left. Over the next three months Sechi began work on another trilogy of supplements that would form the basis of a new RPG. At the same time, Cordovano decided that he did not want to run Bard Games and sold it back to Sechi, who now had a publishing house to produce a new game. In 1987, Bard Games published the first edition of Sechi's new game, Talislanta, which had been inspired by the works of Jack Vance such as the Dying Earth series; the first release, The Chronicles of Talislanta was dedicated to Vance. A revised second edition was published in 1989, and a series of supplements followed, culminating in the Cyclopedia series.

The success of Talislanta allowed Sechi to collect his Atlantis setting material into a new sourcebook, Atlantis: The Lost World (1988) and shortly afterward he published a second edition of the Talislanta game in the Talislanta Handbook & Campaign Guide (1989).

When a buyer from Waldenbooks placed a huge order on Atlantis: The Lost World, Sechi was reluctant to fill it but eventually did; about a year later many of the books were returned, forcing Bard Games to refund about $20,000. After Sechi repaid the company's debts to the book trade, he paid off his partner, and then shut Bard Games down. Sechi retained control of Bard Games' properties, and licensed various rights to Wizards of the Coast, Death's Edge Games, Daedalus Entertainment, and Pharos Press.
