= Rudy Nebres =

Filipino comics artist (born 1937)

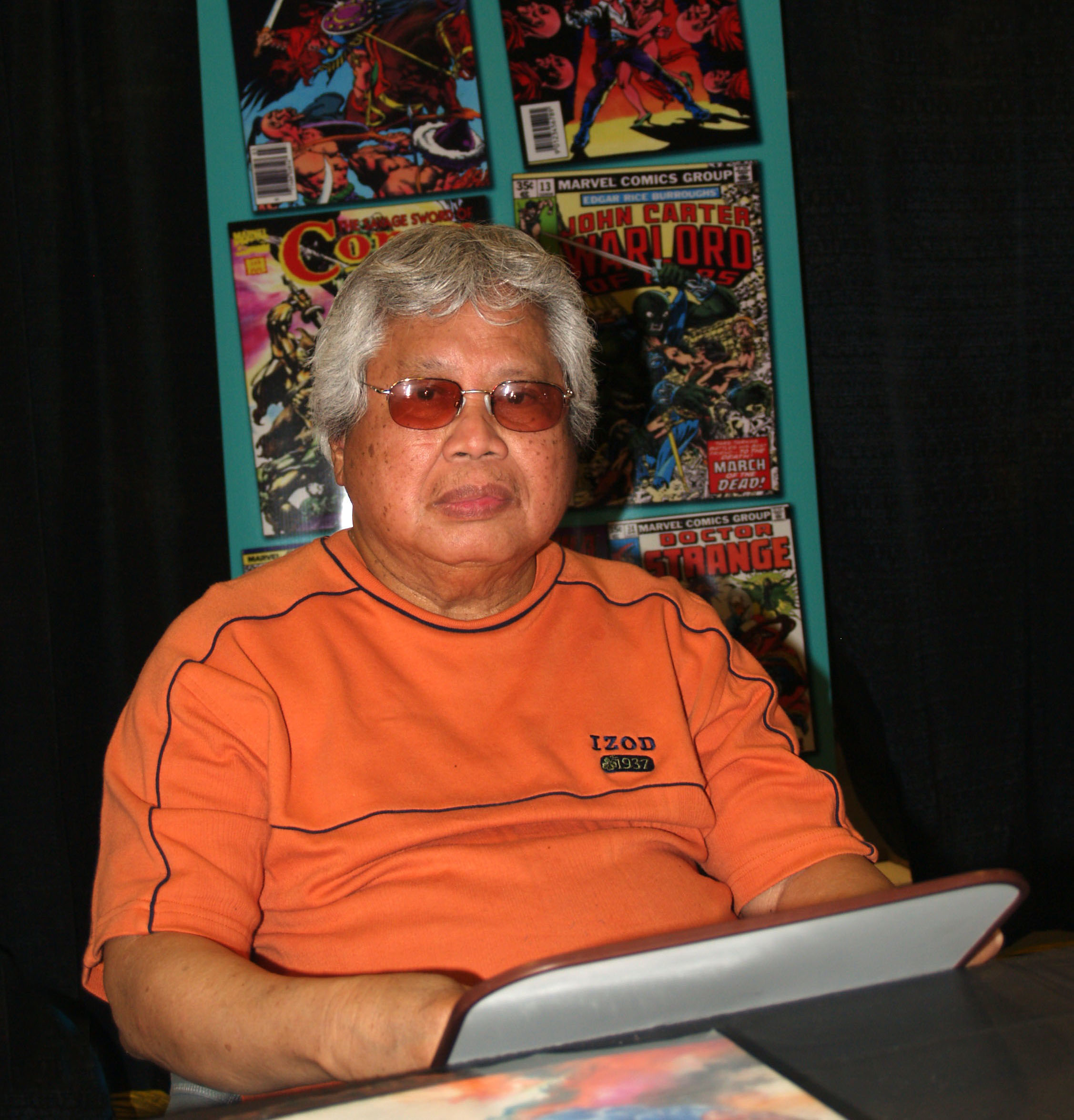
- Nebres at the 2015 East Coast Comicon in Secaucus, New Jersey
- Born: Rodolfo D. Nebres; January 14, 1937 (age 89) Commonwealth of the Philippines
- Areas: Penciller, Inker
- Awards: Inkpot Award 2012; Inkwell Awards 2017 Joe Sinnott Hall of Fame

Rodolfo D. Nebres (born January 14, 1937) is a Filipino comics artist who has worked mostly as an inker in the American comic book industry. Known for his lush, detailed inklines, Nebres' most prolific period was in the late 1970s and the 1980s.

== Career ==
Before coming to the United States, Nebres studied fine arts in the Philippines and worked in the Filipino comics industry for such publishers as Bulaklak Publishing, ACE Publications, and Graphic Arts Service (GASI).

Shortly after DC Comics editor Joe Orlando and publisher Carmine Infantino's 1971 visit to the Philippines to scout talent, Nebres began working for the American comics industry. His debut for DC was the story "The Exterminator" in House of Mystery #210 (Jan. 1973) followed by "The Witch Doctor's Magic Cloak" in House of Secrets #112 (Oct. 1973). From 1973–1977, Nebres was a part of fellow Filipino cartoonist Tony DeZuniga's studio and emigrated to the United States in 1975. Nebres' first Marvel Comics credit was a text article in Savage Tales #6 (Sept. 1974) and he inked the story "Dark Asylum" in Giant-Size Dracula #5 (June 1975) which was John Byrne's first work for Marvel. Nebres later drew Doctor Strange, John Carter, Warlord of Mars, Marvel Super Special, and Power Man and Iron Fist and contributed to Marvel's black-and-white magazine line, Curtis Magazines, most notably on Deadly Hands of Kung Fu.

From 1980–1983, he drew stories for Warren Publishing's Creepy, Eerie, Vampirella, and 1984 titles. Following his stint at Warren, Nebres worked for Pacific Comics, Archie Comics' short-lived superhero line, and Continuity Comics. Nebres then focused on storyboards and commercial art and largely left the comics industry.

In 2000, SQP Inc. published The Art of Rudy Nebres, a collection of fan commissions.

== Awards ==
Rudy Nebres received an Inkpot Award at San Diego Comic-Con in 2012. In 2017, he was awarded the Inkwell Awards Joe Sinnott Hall of Fame award for "an inking career in American comic books of outstanding accomplishment."

== Personal life ==
Nebres resides in New Jersey with his wife, Dolores. They have two children, Melvin and Edwin.

== Bibliography ==
=== Archie Comics ===
- Comet #1 (1983)
- Fly #2–3, 5 (1983–1984)
- Lancelot Strong, the Shield #1–2 (1983)
- Mighty Crusaders #3–5 (1983–1984)

=== Berserker Comics ===
- Maura #1 , #2 (2009)

=== Charlton Comics ===
- Emergency! #4 (1977)

=== Continuity Comics ===
- Armor #2–10, 12–13 (1986–1992)
- Armor vol. 2 #1–2 (1993)
- Hybrids #3 (1993)
- Hybrids vol. 2 #1 (1994)
- Megalith #1 (1989), Megalith Deathwatch 2000#1 cover only (1993)
- Ms. Mystic vol. 3 #2 (1993)
- Ms. Mystic Deathwatch 2000 #3 (1993)
- Samuree #1–2, 4 (1993–1994)
- Toyboy #1–6 (1986–1988)
- Valeria the She-Bat #2 (1995)

=== CrossGen ===
- CrossGen Chronicles #7 (2002)
- Negation: Lawbringer #1 (2002)
- Sigil #26 (2002)
- Sojourn #21 (2003)

=== DC Comics ===
- Arion, Lord of Atlantis #29 (1985)
- Batman #382, 384 (1985)
- Ghosts #75 (1979)
- House of Mystery #210 (1973)
- House of Secrets #112 (1973)
- Showcase '94 #2 (1994)
- The Unexpected #165, 215 (1975–1981)
- Who's Who: The Definitive Directory of the DC Universe #6 (1985)
- The Witching Hour #55 (1975)

=== Marvel Comics ===
- The Amazing Spider-Man Annual #24 (1990)
- The Avengers #178 (1978), #179 (cover) (1979)
- Battlestar Galactica #3 (cover only) (1979)
- Conan the Barbarian #158 (1984)
- Conan the Savage #1–4 (1995)
- Deadly Hands of Kung Fu #9–10, 12–14, 16–24, 29, 33 (1975–1977)
- Doctor Strange vol. 2 #20, 22–24, 26, 32–34 (1976–1979)
- Epic Illustrated #1 (Silver Surfer) (1980)
- Giant-Size Dracula #5 (1975)
- Ghost Rider #26 (cover only) (1977)
- Haunt of Horror #5 (1975)
- The Hulk! #14–16 (1979)
- John Carter, Warlord of Mars #2–5, 8–9, 11–16, 18 (cover) (1977–1978), Annual #1 (1977)
- King Conan #17–18 (1983)
- Kull the Destroyer #22 (1977), #25–26 (1978)
- Marvel Classics Comics #5 ("Black Beauty") (1976), #24 ("She") (1977)
- Marvel Premiere #44 (Jack of Hearts) (1978)
- Marvel Super Special #11–13 (Weirdworld) (1979)
- Marvel Tales #242 (1990)
- Official Handbook of the Marvel Universe #3–8 (1983)
- Official Handbook of the Marvel Universe Deluxe Edition #3, 7–9, 17 (1986–1987)
- Power Man and Iron Fist #76 (1981)
- The Punisher vol. 2 #97–100 (1994–1995)
- The Rampaging Hulk #1–3 (Ulysses Bloodstone backup stories) (1977)
- Red Sonja vol. 3 #3 , #7 (1983)
- Savage Sword of Conan #19 (frontispiece only), 20, 37, 53, 55 (frontispiece only), 88, 93, 96, 98, 101, 107, 114–115, 121, 126, 127, 128 (frontispiece only), (1977–1986), 235 (1995)
- Shang-Chi #1 (variant cover) (2020)
- Star Wars Annual #2 (1982)
- Tales of the Zombie #10 (1975)
- Tarzan #21 (1979)

=== Pacific Comics ===
- Bold Adventure #1–3 (1983–1984)
- Silver Star #5 ("Last of the Viking Heroes" backup feature) (1983)

=== The Comic Coffin ===
- The Depths of Gnar Collection #1 (2014)

=== Valiant Comics ===
- H.A.R.D. Corps #26 (1995)
- Solar, Man of the Atom #41 (1995)
- Timewalker Yearbook #1 (1995)

=== Warren Publishing ===
- 1984 #1–10 (1978–1979)
- 1994 #11–13, 15–16, 18, 21–22, 25, 28 (1980–1982)
- Creepy #96, 110, 115, 120, 122–131, 133–134, 137, 138, 139 (1978–1982)
- Eerie #95, 111, 118, 127–129, 134, 139 (1978–1983)
- The Goblin #1–3 (1982)
- The Rook #1–2, 10–14 (1979–1982)
- Vampirella #84, 88–90, 92–96 (1980–1981)

=== Whitman Comics ===
- Buck Rogers In The 25th Century #16 (cover only) (1982)
