= Laura Martin =

Comics colorist

- Born: Laura DePuy; 15 September 1975 (age 51) Bogotá, Colombia
- Area: Colourist
- Pseudonym: Laura DuPuy Martin
- Awards: Comics Buyer's Guide Favorite Colorist, 2001, 2002, 2003, and 2004. Eisner Award for Best Colorist, 2000 and 2002.
- Spouse: Randy Martin (m. 2001)

Laura DePuy (born 1975, credited later in her career as Laura Martin, having married Randy Martin in 2001) is a colorist who has produced work for several of the major comics companies, including DC Comics, Marvel Comics and CrossGen.

== Career ==
A sometimes comics reader as a child, she attended a graphic design program at the University of Central Florida, and, while "work[ing] the night shift at Kinko's... met [comics/Jim Lee fan] Ian Hannin, who... got me hooked on comics, and started me thinking about a possible career." Hannin later went on to work for Lee's WildStorm Studios, so when DePuy graduated, she "...went to visit him, and took my portfolio (now filled with comic-related coloring and artwork)... [and was] hired on several months later."

=== WildStorm (Image) ===
DePuy/Martin has worked in comics professionally since 1995, and after being hired in 1995, served for five years as a "staff colorist and assistant supervisor," and "[o]ccasional designer" for Jim Lee's WildStorm Studios, then an integral part of Image Comics. Among her earliest works was the collaboratively-colored Marvel/Image(WildStorm) two-issue mini-series Backlash/Spider-Man (Jul-Oct 1996), after which she co-colored issues of Divine Right and StormWatch.

=== WildStorm (DC), DC and Marvel ===
In 1999, after the sale of WildStorm to DC Comics, DePuy became sole colorist on Warren Ellis and John Cassaday's Planetary series, as well as Ellis and Bryan Hitch's Authority. Much of her work since then has involved coloring the artwork of both Cassaday and Hitch, who rarely work with other colorists.

DePuy colored the JLA: Earth 2 graphic novel by Grant Morrison and Frank Quitely in 1999, before, in late 2000, she also began coloring Dougie Braithwaite's art on the Alex Ross/Jim Krueger Marvel series Universe X, and in November joined Bryan Hitch on Mark Waid's JLA, coloring issues #47 - 58, following in tone the oversize volume JLA: Heaven's Ladder.

=== CrossGen ===
From November 2001's Ruse #1, Martin worked on a handful of non-CrossGen comics (occasional issues of Planetary) until summer 2004. In addition to Ruse, she also colored Edge as well as occasional issues of Meridian, Negation and Sojourn, before the company's ultimate collapse.

Martin summarizes this time philosophically, writing:

"CrossGen was a good idea with a lot of talent behind it, that just didn't work out. The reasons are too many to list. But for my personal experience there, let me put it this way: I got to return home to Florida and be near my family. I got to work with some of the best talents in the industry. And I came out of the experience older, wiser, and with many more friends than I had going in. I can't beat that.

Between 2001 and 2003, DePuy/Martin worked as "Assistant art director and Colorist" for CrossGen comics, ultimately moving to the companies base in Florida. During 2001, while coloring issues of CrossGen Chronicles, she was able to continue to color issues of Universe X, Planetary, JLA and Ellis & Chris Weston's Ministry of Space (Image), as well as working on sections of the Oni Press Color Special 2001 and Dark Horse Maverick 2001, before the CrossGen exclusivity began, and she worked for Mark Alessi alone throughout the entirety of 2002 and 2003.

=== Post-CrossGen work ===
Martin's colors over John Cassaday's line art for Astonishing X-Men #6

Post-CrossGen, Martin again worked with Cassaday on the English-language version of his and Fabien Nury's Humanoids Publishing title I Am Legion, before moving (with Cassaday and Hitch) to work primarily for Marvel Comics.

In July 2004, she colored the first issue of Joss Whedon & Cassaday's acclaimed version of the X-Men, Astonishing X-Men, and in February 2005 she worked with Bryan Hitch on Mark Millar's Ultimates 2 #1. In July of the same year, she worked on the Whedon/Brett Matthews & Will Conrad comics version of Whedon's Serenity, the Dark Horse-released Serenity: Those Left Behind.

She has worked on a number of odd issues and covers for comics released by a plethora of companies, including covers for the Infinite Crisis lead-in limited series Villains United, for which she colored the art of J. G. Jones. In the summer of 2006, she colored the main parts of Paul Jenkins' Civil War: Front Line for Marvel's "Civil War" event, and in September 2007 began work on Joseph Michael Straczynski and Olivier Coipel's Thor.

She is also Art Director for the comics website Sequential Tart, a "webzine published by an eclectic band of women." To produce her work, she utilizes Photoshop and a "Wacom Intuos."

In December 2007, she helped color the first issue of Virgin Comics' Tall Tales of Vishnu Sharma: Panchatantra, while continuing to work on Thor and Astonishing X-Men. May 2008 saw her join Garth Ennis and Howard Chaykin on the Marvel MAX series War Is Hell: The First Flight of the Phantom Eagle, while June 2008 saw her debut on the main feature of a Marvel Comics event, coloring the artwork of Leinil Francis Yu on the Brian Michael Bendis-written Secret Invasion limited series.

She continued as colorist on Secret Invasion and War is Hell, having relinquished duties on Astonishing X-Men to new artist Simone Bianchi (with new writer Warren Ellis).

At the 2009 San Diego Comic Con it was announced that she had signed an exclusive contract with Marvel. In 2010, she became the regular colorist on the second ongoing volume of New Avengers.

In June 2008, at Heroes Con in Charlotte, NC, it was announced that she had become a member of Gaijin Studios.

At the 2010 Baltimore Comic Con she created and donated "The Wrong Frog" to auction to benefit the Hero Initiative.

In October 2016, a variant cover she created for the first issue of the Image Comics Millarworld series Reborn was published.

== Awards and recognition ==
She has been recognized for her work with six Eagle Awards (2000–2001, 2005–2008) as well as winning two Eisner Awards for Best Colorist (2000) and (2002), and the Harvey Award between the Eisners in 2001. She was given the 2005 Wizard Fan Award for Favorite Colorist (for Astonishing X-Men).

In August 2014, she was named Inkwell Awards Ambassador, an appointment she holds to the present.

== General references ==
- Laura DePuy at the Grand Comics Database
- Laura Martin at the Grand Comics Database
