= Paul Pelletier =

American comic book penciller

- Area: Penciller

Paul Pelletier is an American comic book penciller.

== Career ==
Pelletier began working as a professional comic artist in the late 1980s. His first work appeared in Cosmic Steller Rebellers (Hammac Publications) and Wayward Warrior (Hammac Publications) later Zen: Intergalactic Ninja. He has worked for renowned comics publishers DC Comics and Marvel Comics as well as for the now out of business Cross Generation Entertainment. His portfolio includes stints as regular artist or guest artist on such series as Darkstars, Flash, Green Lantern, Guy Gardner, Legion of Super-Heroes, Outsiders, Superboy and the Ravers, Superman, Superman: The Man of Steel, Titans, She-Hulk, Fantastic Four, Exiles, Negation and Negation War. Pelletier has drawn special projects such as the mini-series Green Lantern/ Sentinel: Heart of Darkness or the one-shots Flash: Secret Files, Green Lantern: Secret Files and President Luthor Secret Files.

In 2009 and 2010, Pelletier worked on the Marvel Comics miniseries War of Kings and Fall of the Hulks.

Some of the writers he has collaborated with are Ron Marz, Tony Bedard, Chris Claremont, and Karl Kesel.

Pelletier was one of the regular artists on Aquaman during DC's The New 52 initiative.

== Bibliography ==
=== DC Comics ===
- Action Comics, vol. 2 #51 (2016)
- Aquaman, vol. 7 #15-19, 21–33, 35-40 (2013–2015)
- Aquaman/Jabberjaw Special #1 (2018)
- Batgirl, vol. 5 #25-32, 34-36 (2018–2019)
- Batman and Robin Eternal #2-3, 19 (2015–2016)
- Batman Beyond vol. 6 #45, 48-49 (2020)
- Cyborg, vol. 2 #1-2, 7-9 (2016–2017)
- Cyborg: Rebirth #1 (2016)
- Darkstars #10 (1993)
- The Flash, vol. 2 #145-159, 161-162 (1999–2000)
- The Flash, vol. 4 #50 (2016)
- The Flash, vol. 5 #27 (2017)
- Green Lantern, vol. 3 #66-68, 70–73, 76–77, 94, 96, 102, 104, 106, 109 (1995–1999)
- Green Lantern/Sentinel: Heart of Darkness #1-3 (1998)
- Justice League, vol. 2 #51 (2016)
- Justice League: Darkseid War Special #1 (2016)
- Justice League United #13-15 (2015–2016)
- Legion of Super-Heroes, vol. 4 #87, 94 (1996–1997)
- Legionnaires Annual #1 (1994)
- Nightwing, vol. 4 #29 (2017)
- The Outsiders, vol. 2 #1-19, 0 (1993–1995)
- Super Sons Annual #1 (2018)
- Superboy and the Ravers #1-9, 13-14 (1996–1997)
- Superman, vol. 2 #159, 163 (2000)
- Superman: The Man of Steel #49 (1995)
- Tangent Comics/Trials of the Flash #1 (1998)
- The Titans 21–29, 31 (2000–2001)
- Titans, vol. 3 #19-22 (2018)
- Titans: The Lazarus Contract Special #1 (2017)
- Titans Hunt #8 (2016)

=== Marvel Comics ===
- Exiles #69-74, 79–80, 85–88, 90-94 (2005–2007)
- Fall of the Hulks: Alpha #1 (2009)
- Fantastic Four #544-553 (2007–2008)
- Fear Itself: The Fearless #1-12 (2011–2012)
- G.L.A. #1-4 (2005)
- Guardians of the Galaxy, vol. 2 #1-7 (2008–2009)
- The Incredible Hulk #407-412, Annual #19, #605-611 (1993, 2009–2010)
- Incredible Hulks #618-622, 630-635 (2010-2011)
- Nova, vol. 4 #11-12 (2008)
- Secret Invasion: War of Kings #1 (2008)
- She-Hulk #5-6, 9-12 (2004–2005)
- She-Hulk, vol. 2 #3 (2005)
- Silver Surfer, vol. 3 #132-133 (1997)
- Uncanny X-Men/Fantastic Four Annual 1998 #1 (1998)
- War of Kings #1-6 (2009)
- War of Kings: Who Will Rule? #1 (2009)
- Wolverine #304-308, 314-317 (2012–2013)
- X-Force #37 (1994)

=== CrossGen ===
- Crux #6 (2001)
- Mystic #40 (2003)
- Negation #1-5, 7–10, 12–16, 18–21, 23-27 (2002–2004)
- Negation Prequel #1 (2001)
- Negation War #1-2 (2004)
- Sigil #15 (2001)

=== Malibu Comics ===
- Demon's Tails #1-4 (1993)
- Ex-Mutants #1-9 (1992)

=== Image Comics ===
- G.I. Joe: A Real American Hero #306-310, 316-320, 322-324 (2024-present)
