= Andrea Di Vito =

Italian comic book artist (born 1971)

- Born: May 28, 1971 (age 55) Rome, Italy
- Area: Artist
- Notable works: Thor, Stormbreaker: The Saga of Beta Ray Bill, Annihilation, The Union, Dungeons & Dragons, Wolverine: Patch

Andrea Di Vito (born May 28, 1971) is an Italian comic book artist.

== Biography ==
Di Vito was born in Rome, and showed a love for drawing from an early age. His first published work appeared in the form of two short stories in the Italian magazine Intrepido. He was first published in America in Marvel Comics' Marvel Shadows and Light, with one of his pinups appearing in the comic book. Di Vito was asked to join the CrossGen staff as an associate penciller and became a fill-in artist for the comic books The First and Scion, becoming the official penciller of the former six months later. On getting his start in comics, Di Vito said, "After years of attempts, I went to San Diego Comic-Con, back in 2000. It was my last shot at finding a gig as a comic book artist. I remember meeting Steve McNiven that day, as we both stood in line to show our samples to Marvel. A few hours later I bumped into Mark Alessi, who at that time was starting up Crossgen. He was the first one to believe I could do something in this business and hired me as an apprentice artist".

After nine issues on The First, Di Vito worked with Chuck Dixon and Rob Schwager on a new project, Brath. After over a year of work on this title, Di Vito decided to expand his horizons, lending his talents to other companies. He has pencilled such high-profile Marvel series as Thor and Young Avengers. He also worked with IDW, becoming the regular penciler for Dungeons & Dragons and Thunder Agents.

He penciled the six-issue miniseries Annihilation and the World War Hulk: X-Men limited series. He then worked on The Union after having penciled The Savage Sword of Conan #12. Later, he penciled the five-issue miniseries Wolverine: Patch.

== Reception ==
Di Vito's run on Thor, also known as Avengers Disassembled: Thor (2004), has been included in multiple lists of top Thor runs: #6 on CBR, #4 on Screen Rant, #4 on Nerdist, and #7 on Wired Italy.

In his review of the ongoing Dungeons & Dragons series, Chris Sims, for ComicsAlliance, wrote that John Rogers's writing is "perfectly complimented [sic] by Di Vito's expressive art" and that "It's fair to say that on some level, we all realize that a comic's protagonists are not really in any danger, but in a world based on D&D [...] the 'threat' of a battle is even lower. So rather than trying to craft battles with a false sense of importance, Rogers and Di Vito focus instead on making them interesting and memorable, and they definitely succeed". Also for ComicsAlliance, Chris Murphy wrote, "I was even more surprised by another licensed book, IDW's new Dungeons and Dragons series, which you would expect to be a completely phoned in book that's only read by diehard D&D fans who failed their intelligence checks. The thing is, apparently no one told writer John Rogers and artist Andrea Di Vito that, and as a result Dungeons and Dragons is way more fun than it has any right to be".

In his 2018 review of Ant-Man and the Wasp: Living Legends #1, Joshua Davison, for Bleeding Cool, wrote, "Like the other Ralph Macchio and Andrea di Vito comics of the sort, it is a good entry point for the characters, especially for younger audiences. [...] Di Vito's artwork is good, if a little simple in some style choices. The inking is often a little heavier than it needs to be, but the overall aesthetic looks good and matches the upbeat nature of the story".

In a 2020 review of The Union #1, The Beat highlighted that "the mini-series from Paul Grist and Andrea Di Vito caught a lot of attention after its initial reveal. [...] Di Vito’s art is rock solid, as always, and makes all of the RB Silva-designed looks pop off the page with appropriately bright and flashy colors from Woodard. While not boundary-pushing, Di Vito’s art is the gold standard for classic house-style superhero comics art and helps to lend a sense of authenticity to the new team".

== Bibliography ==
=== CrossGen Comics ===
- Brath #1-5, 7-14
- Brath Prequel #1
- The First #6, 15–20, 22-24
- Saurians: Unnatural Selection #1-2
- Scion #10, 12, 28

=== IDW Publishing ===
==== Interiors ====
- Dungeons & Dragons: Fell's Five #0–15
- T.H.U.N.D.E.R. Agents #1-4

==== Covers ====
- G.I. JOE: Origins Omnibus, Vol. 1
- G.I. Joe: Snake Eyes & Storm Shadow Vol. 1

=== Marvel Comics ===
==== Interiors ====
- Annihilation #1-6
- Annihilation: Heralds of Galactus #2
- Black Panther #33
- Captain America and the Falcon #8
- Civil War: House of M #1-5
- Marvel Comics Presents #1-7
- Nova #22-24, 26–28, 31–33, 35
- Stormbreaker: The Saga of Beta Ray Bill #1-6
- Thing #1-5
- Thor #80-85
- Young Avengers #7-8
- What If Aunt May Had Died Instead of Uncle Ben?
- World War Hulk: X-Men #1-3
- Avengers: Edge of Infinity
- Avengers: Shards of Infinity
- Black Panther: The sound and the Fury
- Ant-Man & The Wasp: Living legends
- Captain Marvel :Movie prelude
- Guardians of the Galaxy: Living the dream
- Marvel: Future Fight
- Marvel: Strike Force
- Predator vs. Wolverine #2
- Spider-Man: Morning Rush
- The Savage Sword of Conan #12
- The Union #1-5
- Wolverine: Patch #1-5
- Nightcrawlers #2

==== Covers ====
- Annihilation: The Nova Corps Files
- Annihilation Saga
- Stormbreaker: The Saga of Beta Ray Bill #1-6
- Thing #1-8
- X-Factor #19
- Avengers: Infinity Shards
- Black Panther: The Sound and the Fury
