= Mark of Charon =

Comic book series

Publication information
- Publisher: CrossGen
- Schedule: Monthly
- Format: Limited series
- Publication date: April - August 2003
- No. of issues: 5
- Main character(s): Charon; Javi Cobian; Appolyon; Lawbringers; Ligis-bearers

Creative team
- Created by: Mark Alessi
- Written by: Tony Bedard
- Penciller: Joe Bennett
- Inker: Jonathan Glapion
- Colorist: Dave McCaig

Mark of Charon is an American comic book published by CrossGen Entertainment from April to August 2003. It is a five-issue limited series written by Tony Bedard and penciled by Joe Bennett. Taking place in the Sigilverse, it primarily features the characters Charon, Javi Cobian and Appolyon.

== Plot synopsis ==
The story begins with Charon restoring Javi Cobian to life (placing these events sometime after his death in Negation #25) and a subsequent discussion on what evil really means. Charon eventually reveals his plan to place his own Sigil (what he refers to as his "Ligis") on those from the Negation universe but he needs Javi's help.

Charon resurrecting Javi Cobian; preview art by Joe Bennett, Jonathan Glapion, and Dave McCaig.

As Javi has a Sigil and is unique to human physiology, it is impossible for Charon to simply place his mark upon the inhabitants of the Negation. Thus Charon has been attempting to bond human DNA to Negation inhabitants with little progress. After Charon shows Javi a failed experiment he persuades Javi to heal his next subject. Javi successfully heals a female alien and Charon places his mark upon her.

Charon convinces Javi to lead his team of Ligis-bearers (made up of the teleporter Shrakti, the vicious Tibian, the telepathic Trocantor, and the muscle Brevus) which he reluctantly agrees to. On their first away mission Javi hopes to resolves things without resulting to force though he quickly losses control of his team who begin killing the alien troops. Using his Sigil Javi takes their abilities way from them and brings them back under control.

Javi tells the team that they cannot just go around killing people and that they should obey his will for Charon has chosen him to lead them, equating himself with Charon. He is interrupted by a Lawbringer who cries out 'sacrilege'. The Lawbringers question Javi's presumptions and demand to know why they have their 'Fathers' touch on them. Javi proceeds to antagonize the Lawbringers touting that they are their replacements, Charon's Ligis-bearers. Observing the situation on a monitor Charon turns to his men and says that they chose well in Javi.

The Lawbringers become even more angered at Javi and the Ligis-bearers. Javi claims to know of the Lawbringers origins (though he doesn't really). A Lawbringer demands to links minds to find out the truth and without warning Javi's mind is linked with the Lawbringers. As they search his minds for answers Javi sees the memories of the Lawbringers. How they were Charon's first army and how they decimated the galaxy and left nothing for Charon to integrate into his empire because they had no value for life.

The Lawbringers know that Javi lied about knowing their origin though he proposes to use his Sigil to see past the Lawbringer mental blocks and see the truth of their creation. Reluctantly the Lawbringers agree curious themselves of their origins. Javi connects with everyone and the see back millions of years to the time when Charon first arrived in this universe. They witness an argument between Charon and Appolyon which results in Charon dispelling all his rage and creating the Lawbringers. The vision ends with Charon casting Appolyon into limbo. Javi tells the Lawbringers that they are Charon's 'waste', the parts of him he did not want and then leaves on the idea of going to see Appolyon as they are teleported away by Shrakti.

The group suddenly appear in a place they do not know. Surrounded by lava the group come to face with a strange man dressed in a doctor's suit who later turns out to be Appolyon. He takes them to his tower where he explains the origins of himself and Charon and how they first came to the Negation universe.
