= Scion (comics) =

American comic book

- Cover to Scion #1

Publication information
- Publisher: CrossGen Comics Inc.
- Schedule: Monthly
- Publication date: July 2000 – April 2004
- No. of issues: 43
- Main character(s): Ethan of Heron; Skink; Ashleigh of Raven; Exeter; Bron

Creative team
- Created by: Mark Alessi; Gina M. Villa
- Written by: Ron Marz
- Penciller: Jim Cheung
- Inker: Don Hillsman II
- Colorist: Caesar Rodriguez

Scion is an American comic book published by CrossGen Entertainment from July 2000 to April 2004. It was cancelled due to the bankruptcy of Crossgen Comics Inc. in 2004.

== Plot synopsis ==
The story of Scion mainly concerns Ethan, youngest prince of the Heron Dynasty. He is accompanied by Skink, a member of the Lower Races and his best friend. While the Heron and Raven Dynasties have been at war for hundreds of years, there exists at the beginning of the tale a relative peace between the two Kingdoms, but this peace doesn't last.

Ethan is later joined by Ashleigh, the princess of the Raven dynasty, and a bounty hunter named Exeter, who is a genetically modified humanoid. The main antagonist is Prince Bron of the Raven Dynasty, the older brother of Ashleigh. Bron is determined to kill Ethan and Ashleigh.

The group experience many events, most notably a war between the Heron and Raven kingdoms, the establishment of a free nation for the lower races and an invasion by an army of mechanical robots. Skink is secretly an agent of greater powers, being a fragment of Danik. Bron's advisor Mai Shen is really a member of The First.

The final issue ends with Ethan and his father caught in a nuclear explosion. An added short narrative scene, taking place hundreds of years in the future, assures readers that Ethan does escape the blast.

== Characters ==
- Ethan is one of the five original sigil-bearing characters introduced by way of CrossGen's first four flagship titles (Mystic, Sigil, Scion, and Meridian). He is the youngest son of King Dane and Queen Mariella, the ruling monarchs of the Heron Dynasty, a nation inherent to a continent placed in what is considered the western portion of the planet Avalon. He has two older brothers, Artor and Kai, and an older sister, Ylena.
- Bron is a crown Prince of the Raven Dynasty, a ruthless and brutal man who suffers a bad facial scar during a ritual combat with Prince Ethan of the Heron Dynasty. Bron is a dangerous fighter and a ruthless monster of a man.
- Ashleigh is a Princess of the Raven Dynasty and a sister to Bron.
- Bernd Rechts is a mysterious stranger who offers his services as a military advisor to the Heron Dynasty. Secretly one of the self-styled gods known as The First, he is sent to monitor Prince Ethan, the Sigil-Bearer. He appears as a quiet, sober man.
- Nadia is the traveler from the kingdom of Tigris.

== Comics and books ==
Scion ran for 43 issues (from July 2000 till April 2004).

CrossGen also published four trade paperback books collecting the first half of the series. A fifth and sixth volume were announced but never released due to CrossGen's bankruptcy. Checker Book Publishing Group subsequently announced to release volumes five and six after licensing the rights to a number of CrossGen titles from Disney. They only ended up releasing Volume Six, while Volume Five: The Far Kingdom remains unpublished.

Title	Binding	Material collected	Publication date	ISBN
Scion Volume 1: Conflict of Conscience	Trade paperback	Scion #1–7	May 2001	978-1931484022
Scion Volume 2: Blood for Blood	Trade paperback	Scion #8-14, CrossGen Chronicles #2	March 2002	978-1931484084
Scion Volume 3: Divided Loyalties	Trade paperback	Scion #15-21	October 2002	978-1931484268
Scion Volume 4: Sanctuary	Trade paperback	Scion #22-27	March 2003	978-1931484503
Scion Volume 6: The Royal Wedding	Trade paperback	Scion #34-39	January 2008	978-1933160603

== Reception ==
Scion was one of CrossGen Entertainment's first series and received attention upon its release in 2000. John Simcoe of the York Sunday News reviewed Scion, noting that the story was cliched and that the art was the least impressive of the CrossGen lineup, but that "it's an intriguing read and has a lot of potential".

Matthew Price reviewed the series for The Daily Oklahoman in 2003 and stated that it mixes the feel of Arthurian fantasy with the technological elements of Star Wars.

In reviews for several of the trade paperback collections, Publishers Weekly gave the series a positive reception, describing it as "more than the sum of its parts", "a remarkably smart and good-looking comic", and "understated dramatic graphic storytelling at its best".

=== Awards ===
- Harvey Award for Best Writer (2002, Ron Marz, nominated)
- Harvey Award for Best Continuing Series (2002, nominated)
