= Caesar Rodriguez =

Comic artist

- Area: Colourist

Caesar Rodriguez is an artist who has worked as a colorist in the comics industry.

== Biography ==
Rodriguez has been a regular comics reader since he was four years old. In 1989, he opened a comic and magazine shop in Los Angeles. There he met several artists and was doing work painting, creating graphics, sculpture, etc. in a studio in the store. One of these artists included J. D. Smith, a freelance artist who later got work with Dark Horse Comics on their Dracula series.

His first published work was as a penciller for Click Comics, where he worked with Joe Casey on The Chosen. Shortly thereafter, he was working with J. D. Smith as his assistant on Fathom, Spirit of the Tao, and Witchblade as a production artist and background colorist. He also worked with Steve Firchow and Richard Isanove doing production work on Daredevil, Daredevil: Father, X-Men, Ultimate X-Men, Wolverine: Origin, Aphrodite 9, More than Mortal, The Maxx, Marvel 1602, Ant-Man Christmas Special, Conan: Red Nails, Magneto Rex.

In San Diego, he met Brandon Peterson who later hired him at Crossgen. His work there included Scion and Sojourn. Most recently, he has been hired with Richard Isanove as a colorists for Dynamite Entertainment's Red Sonja series. His other published work includes CrossGen Chronicles, Crux, Sojourn, The First, and R. A. Salvatore's DemonWars. He is working with Eric Basaldua, coloring covers for Top Cow, Dynamite Entertainment and Zenescope publications.

He is also currently working with 813 Services & Solutions, a publishing contract firm.
