= Ruse (comics) =

Marvel comic book series

- Cover to Ruse #1

Publication information
- Publisher: Crossgen Entertainment
- Schedule: Monthly
- Publication date: November 2001 – January 2004
- No. of issues: 26
- Main character(s): Simon Archard; Emma Bishop; Miranda Cross; Malcolm Lightbourne

Creative team
- Created by: Mark Alessi; Gina M. Villa
- Written by: Mark Waid
- Penciller: Butch Guice
- Inker: Mike Perkins
- Colorist: Laura DePuy

Ruse is a comic book featuring detectives Simon Archard and Emma Bishop. Originally published by CrossGen, it was revived in 2011 by Marvel Comics as part of its acquisition of CrossGen titles.

== Publication history ==
Ruse ran for twenty-six issues from November 2001 to January 2004 before it was forced to end by the bankruptcy of CrossGen. The first 9 issues of the series were written by Mark Waid. Scott Beatty contributed dialogue to Waid's co-plotting with the Ruse team on issues #10-12, and scripted the rest of the series from issues #13-26. Nearly the entire series featured pencils by Butch Guice. The critically acclaimed series was known for complex plots, the witty repartee between the two protagonists, and being of an unusual genre in comic books (Victorian era detective fiction).

The series also had three spin-off issues, each called Ruse: Archard's Agents and all written by Chuck Dixon.

Marvel Comics revived CrossGen titles in 2011; Ruse, as a four-issue miniseries, was released in March of the same year, written by Mark Waid.

== Setting ==
=== Original series ===
Ruse takes place on the planet Arcadia, primarily in the fictional town of Partington, in a Victorian era setting tinged with elements of magic and fantasy. The most visible difference from real London is that it has living gargoyles which are regarded by the populace as creatures as commonplace as pigeons.

=== Revived series ===
The revived series established the city of Partington as a settlement in Victorian England, and made no mention of the Sigils or Negation characters from the original series. References were made to events and characters from the CrossGen series.

== Characters ==
The series focused on two primary protagonists: Simon Archard and Emma Bishop. The relationship between the two attractive leads is purely professional, although the two share great chemistry and other characters make numerous innuendos about their relationship.

Simon Archard is a detective. He is a master sleuth and extremely competent. He has an eidetic memory. He is feared by the criminals of Partington, and his presence apparently keeps the crime rate low. He is close to emotionless, remaining utterly calm in situations of crisis. He is also emotionally distant from other people. His character is based on Sherlock Holmes. It is implied that Simon Archard is his world's Sigil Bearer, but he does not receive the mark from anyone at the beginning of the series nor does he seem to have any special powers except his mental abilities (he does however wear the Sigil mark upon his tie pin). It is possible that Simon received the mark before the series began, gets his abilities from it and is able to hide it from everyone (and wears the mark on his tie pin as respect for the powers it gives him).

Emma Bishop is Simon Archard's assistant. She has mysterious magical powers which she is not supposed to use. Careful to maintain her identity, she conceals her powers (though it was revealed in the last issue of the series, #26, that Archard had secretly deduced her powers almost from the very beginning). The source of her abilities was never revealed in the series, though a reader familiar with the rest of the CrossGen Universe could deduce from her powers and her orange eyes that she was one of the guides that accompanied Sigil-bearers.

Miranda Cross is the primary antagonist of the series. She initially appears to be a beautiful baroness, but it is revealed that she is evil, many centuries old, and from a different world. She also possesses magical powers, which are at least the equal of and probably stronger than those of Emma Bishop. She is possibly a demon of some sort, though the exact nature of her identity is not resolved by the end of the series. Her dialogue in Ruse #18 (April 2003) possibly hints that she is a Negation Lawbringer.

Malcolm Lightbourne is Simon Archard's former mentor and chief rival. Lightbourne's main goal throughout the series is the retrieval of the Enigmatic Prism, which Archard stole from him at the end of their partnership. Lightbourne also seeks to kill Archard and attempts to achieve both of his goals by destroying the city of Partington.

The Consortium of Aggrieved Man Servants are a group of Butlers that strive to achieve the impossible: to kill Simon Archard. This underground conspiracy has swelled in ranks over the years every time Archard has muttered the phrase "the Butler did it". Even though the consortium has made many (botched) attempts on Archard's life, he seems un-characteristically unaware of their existence or perhaps he just doesn't care.

Archard's Agents are a network of people that Archard uses to gather information on cases. Members of the group include a former prize fighter, a child psychic, and a bearded lady.

== Plot ==
While some issues were standalone issues in which Simon Archard and Emma Bishop solved some small mystery in Partington, most issues were concerned with the larger storyline running throughout the entire series.

This storyline focused on a mysterious artifact called the Enigmatic Prism, which incited evil desires, such as hate, lust, and a need to do violence within people. Miranda Cross wanted the Enigmatic Prism to do evil with, and to use it to return to her homeworld. Simon Archard and Emma Bishop sought to destroy the prism, to prevent the artifact from causing further harm.

== Quotes ==
- Emma, when asked what she has learned: "I've learned that... that Simon Archard shows all the crimeside manner of a cactus".
- Simon: "Begging your pardon, but would you two please repeat that exchange? I can barely hear it over the clamor of mysterious subtext".
- Miranda: "All that you know, all you can conceive... I and others like me are fated to control it".
- Emma: "Wait. Don't speak for a moment. I wish to bask in the warm glow of your praise".

== Collections ==
=== Original series ===
There have been a number of trade paperbacks collecting some of the issues:

- Ruse: Enter the Detective by Mark Waid, Butch Guice and Mike Perkins, collects Ruse #1-6, CrossGen, 160 pages, July 2002, ISBN 1-931484-19-8.
- Ruse: The Silent Partner by Mark Waid, Scott Beatty, Butch Guice, collects Ruse #7-12, CrossGen, 160 pages, February 2003, ISBN 1-931484-48-1

The following collections were solicited, but never published due to CrossGen's bankruptcy:

- Ruse: Criminal Intent by Scott Beatty, Butch Guice, Mike Perkins and Laura DePuy, collects Ruse #13-18, CrossGen, 160 pages, July 2004, ISBN 1-931484-74-0
- Ruse: Collection by Scott Beatty & Butch Guice, collects Ruse #19-26, Checkerbooks, January 2009, ISBN 1-933160-80-2
- Ruse Omnibus by Waid, Beatty, Guice and Perkins, collects Ruse #1-17, Checkerbooks, 500 pages, January 2009, ISBN 1-933160-77-2

=== Revived series ===
- Ruse: The Victorian Guide to Murder (by Mark Waid and Jackson Guice, collects Ruse (Volume 2), #1-4, Marvel Comics, 96 pages, October 2011, ISBN 978-0-7851-5586-7)

== Awards ==
Ruse has been nominated for five Eisners and has won a number of awards, including:

- 2002 Laura DuPuy won the Eisner Award for Best Coloring

== Film ==
A screenwriter Siavash Farahani has written a Ruse film script for Disney while Sam Raimi was attached to direct the project.

== See also ==
- List of steampunk works
