= Frank Darabont's unrealized projects =

Unproduced films by American filmmaker

Throughout his career, American filmmaker Frank Darabont has worked on several projects which never progressed beyond the pre-production stage. Some of these projects fell into development hell, were officially cancelled, or would eventually come to fruition under a different production team.

== 1990s ==
=== Frankenstein ===
Around 1993, Darabont was brought on to write American Zoetrope's bigscreen version of Frankenstein by Mary Shelley. The resulting 1994 film, directed by Kenneth Branagh, bore little to no resemblance to Darabont's adaptation. "[The] movie I saw made me want to walk out into traffic after the premiere and step in front of a bus," Darabont recalled. Guillermo del Toro, who read the draft when he was trying to develop his own version of Frankenstein, considered it to be a "pretty much perfect" expression of the novel, but ultimately not really filmed. Mick Garris concurred that it was "a wonderful script [...] [but] it wasn't really the movie I saw." When asked what went wrong with the production, Darabont responded, "The movie I had in my head—I, the adapter, the writer—and the movie that the director had, in his head, weren't the same movie. [...] And, at the end of the day, the document you hand somebody can only take you as far down the road as you have some shared sensibilities, you know?"

=== Captain Blood remake ===
In 1994, Chuck Russell enlisted Darabont to help revise Jonathan Hensleigh's screenplay for a planned big-budget remake of the classic swashbuckler Captain Blood at Warner Bros. Pictures. They worked on the project, intended as a vehicle for Arnold Schwarzenegger, but it fell apart when studios decided that too many pirate films were under way.

=== Weird Tales TV episode ===
In 1995, it was reported that both Darabont and Clive Barker were among the creatives who would adapt and direct future episodes of the HBO anthology series Weird Tales, based on the pulp horror magazines of the same name. It was "[aimed] to be a sophisticated take on horror for the adult market".

=== Untitled Western sci-fi film ===
In a 1996 issue of Mad Movies magazine, it was indicated that Darabont had written a "Western with a sci-fi twist", about an extraterrestrial that lands in the Wild West, which John Carpenter would direct. Carpenter later corroborated this claim, saying, "I had a western come along that I liked, but they wanted to turn it into a science‑fiction movie!"

=== Mine ===
In 1997, it was reported that Darabont was writing the feature film adaptation of Robert R. McCammon's novel Mine for Castle Rock Entertainment. By 2004, Darabont had taken the project to Paramount Pictures, where he developed it as a possible directing vehicle alongside Tokyo Rose and Rivers in the Desert.

=== Stich in Time ===
Also in 1997, Darabont was writing Stich in Time, an original science fiction film with Joel Silver producing for Warner Bros. Pictures.

=== Doc Savage ===
In 1999, Darabont and Chuck Russell were set to co-direct and co-produce a feature film adaptation of Doc Savage, with David Leslie Johnson-McGoldrick co-developing the story with Darabont and Russell, and Arnold Schwarzenegger in the title role. Castle Rock Entertainment was producing the film, and Universal Pictures agreed to co-distribute with Warner Bros. Pictures. Darabont later moved the project to Paramount.

== 2000s ==
=== Fahrenheit 451 ===
In January 2001, it was reported that Darabont was negotiating to direct and rewrite Terry Hayes' script adaptation of Ray Bradbury's novel Fahrenheit 451, with Castle Rock Entertainment and Icon Productions set to produce and Warner Bros. handling distribution. In June, Bradbury confirmed that Darabont was set to direct.

=== The Martian Chronicles ===
In June 2001, author Ray Bradbury revealed that, in addition to Fahrenheit 451, Darabont would also direct the feature film adaptation of his novel The Martian Chronicles.

=== Indiana Jones and the City of Gods ===
In May 2002, IGN reported that Darabont had been hired to write the fourth installment in the Indiana Jones franchise. The screenplay, entitled Indiana Jones and the City of Gods, was set in the 1950s and featured ex-Nazis pursuing Dr. Jones. Darabont also introduced the prospect of Marion Ravenwood returning as Jones' love interest. Steven Spielberg worked closely with Darabont and conceived the idea because of real-life figures such as Juan Perón, who protected Nazi war criminals. In an April 2007 interview for MTV News promoting The Mist, Darabont said that the experience writing City of Gods showed him "how badly things can go" as the script was favored by Spielberg, but ultimately rejected by George Lucas. "I told [Lucas] he was crazy. I said, 'You have a fantastic script. I think you're insane, George.' You can say things like that to George, and he doesn't even blink. He's one of the most stubborn men I know." Asked if any remnant of his material remained, Darabont candidly responded, "I have no idea if there's a shred of it left. It was a tremendous disappointment and a waste of a year." David Koepp ended up taking over writing duties and the film morphed into Indiana Jones and the Kingdom of the Crystal Skull.

=== The Way of the Rat ===
In October 2002, Darabont was set to executive produce the feature film adaptation of Chuck Dixon, Jeff Johnson and Tom Ryder’s kung fu comic book Way of the Rat, with Chuck Russell set to write & direct the movie, Darabont’s Darkwoods Productions will produce in collaboration with Castle Rock Entertainment and DreamWorks Pictures handling film distribution, until January 29, 2004, when Darabont moved the movie from DreamWorks to Paramount Pictures and may direct instead of Russell.

=== Tokyo Rose ===
On June 12, 2003, Darabont was set to direct and executive produce Tokyo Rose, a biopic about Iva Toguri D'Aquino, with Christopher Hampton in talks to write the screenplay and Anna Garduno and Barbara Trembley producing with Darabont’s Darkwoods Productions, and on January 29, 2004, Paramount Pictures would handle film distribution.

=== Back Roads ===
On October 30, 2003, Darabont was set to executive produce the feature film adaptation of Tawni O’Dell’s novel Back Roads, with Todd Field possibly set to direct the screenplay and Anna Garduno and Barbara Trembley producing with Darabont’s Darkwoods Productions, and on January 29, 2004, Darabont was likely attached to direct instead of Field and Paramount Pictures would handle film distribution. In 2018, actor Alex Pettyfer ended up directing the feature film adaptation.

=== Runt of the Litter ===
On January 29, 2004, Darabont was set to executive produce and possibly set to direct the feature film adaptation of Bo Eason’s autobiographical play Runt of the Litter with Paramount Pictures handling film distribution, and on January 24, 2007, Eason was writing the screenplay for the feature film adaptation, Darabont was likely going to just produce the film and Castle Rock Entertainment will handle film distribution instead of Paramount.

=== Water and Power ===
On January 29, 2004, Darabont was set to executive produce and possibly set to direct an adaptation of Rivers in the Desert: William Mulholland and the Inventing of Los Angeles at Paramount Pictures. On March 5, 2010, Darabont was set to executive produce and direct the movie entitled Water and Power, with Bruce McKenna writing the screenplay, and Phoenix Pictures producing instead of Paramount.

=== Standing Down ===
On January 29, 2004, Darabont was set to executive produce and possibly set to direct the romance film Standing Down, with Paramount Pictures handling film distribution.

=== The Long Walk ===
On April 18, 2007, Darabont acquired the rights to direct the feature film adaptation of Stephen King’s novel The Long Walk, which was eventually directed by Francis Lawrence.

=== The Monkey ===
On April 18, 2007, Darabont acquired the rights to direct the feature film adaptation of Stephen King’s short story "The Monkey"; which was eventually directed by Osgood Perkins.

=== The Wolfman ===
In February 2008, Darabont likely was offered to direct the remake of The Wolf Man, before Joe Johnston was hired to direct the remake.

=== Law Abiding Citizen ===
In May 2008, Darabont was set to direct Kurt Wimmer’s crime thriller screenplay Law Abiding Citizen, until he was replaced by F. Gary Gray because of creative differences with the producers.

== 2010s ==
=== The Huntsman: Winter's War ===
On June 26, 2014, Darabont was offered to direct the Snow White and the Huntsman spinoff film The Huntsman: Winter's War, before Cedric Nicolas-Troyan was attached to direct.

== 2020s ==
=== The Downslope ===
In 2021, during an interview, Darabont revealed that he had written a film treatment based on the former Stanley Kubrick project entitled The Downslope, which was set during the American Civil War. Ridley Scott was to executive produce the film, the project never came to fruition.
