= Trial by Fire (comics) =

Publication information
- Publisher: Code6 (CrossGen)
- Schedule: Monthly
- Format: Limited series
- Publication date: January – May 2003
- No. of issues: 5
- Main character: Andacanavar

Creative team
- Created by: R. A. Salvatore
- Written by: Scott Ciencin
- Artist: Ron Wagner
- Letterer: David Lanphear
- Colorist: Caesar Rodriguez
- Editor(s): Ian Feller; Ron Marz

Collected editions
- Trial by Fire: ISBN 1-931484-62-7

Trial by Fire is a five-issue mini-series published in 2003 by CrossGen. The story was plotted by R. A. Salvatore and Scott Ciencin, scripted by Scott Ciencin, with art by Ron Wagner and colors by Caesar Rodriguez.

It is based on Salvatore's The DemonWars Saga and focuses on the elven trained barbarian ranger Andacanavar.

== Plot ==
In Trial by Fire, a young Andacanavar embarks on one of his earliest adventures. With his Elven-forged blade and improbable allies, the ranger fights to save a world of magic from the ravages of a DemonWar.

== Collected editions ==
The series has been collected into a trade paperback:

- Demon Wars: Trial by Fire (160 pages, CrossGen, May 2003, ISBN 1-931484-62-7)
