= Joshua Middleton =

American artist and designer

Josh Middleton
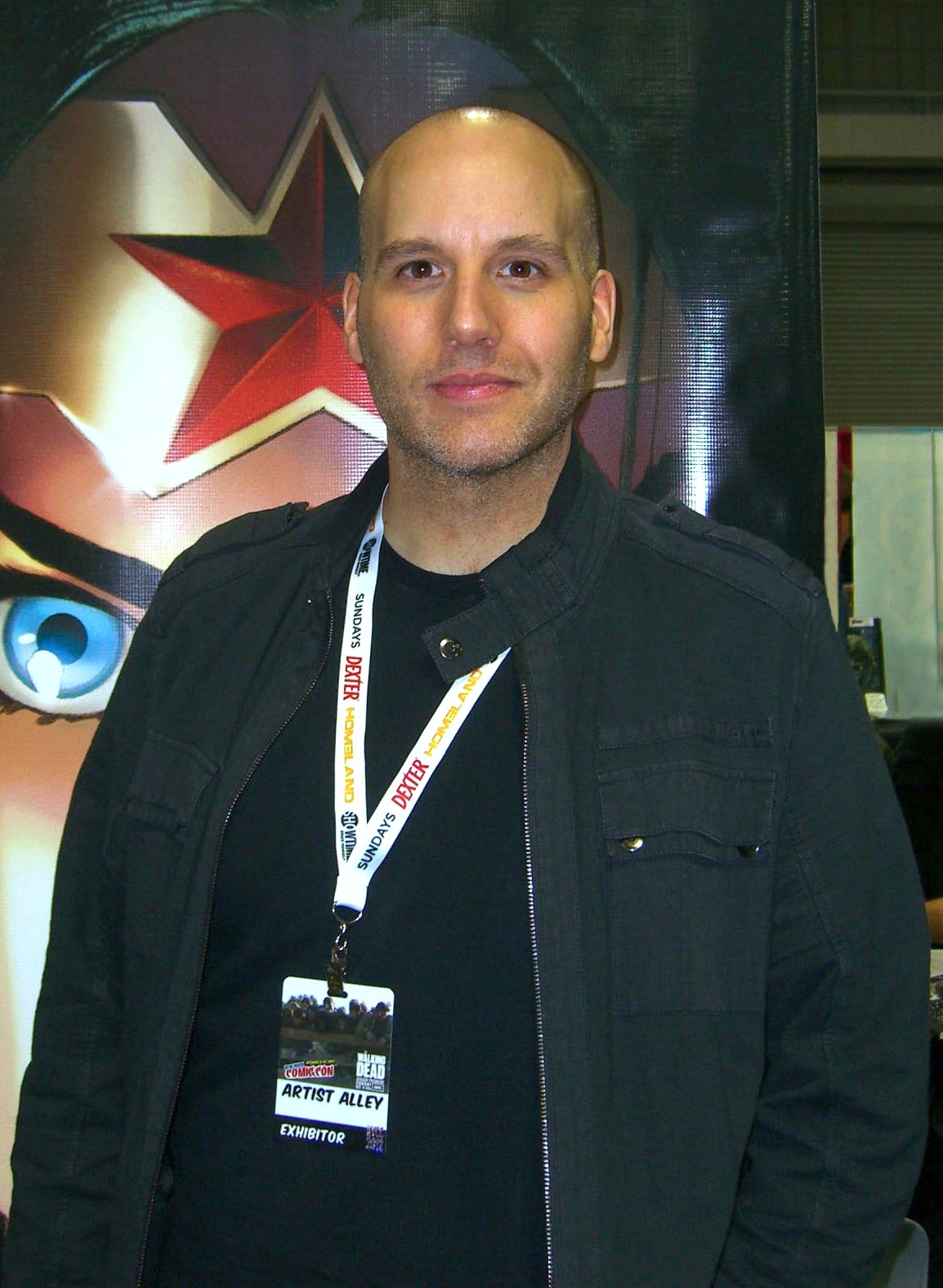
- Middleton at the 2012 New York Comic Con.
- Born: Joshua Middleton Harrisburg, Pennsylvania
- Areas: Penciller, Inker, Colourist

Joshua Middleton (sometimes credited as Josh Middleton) is an artist and designer working in the animation, film, comics, and book industries. In 2004 he was nominated for an Eisner Award as "Best Cover Artist" for his work on Marvel's NYX, X-Men Unlimited, and New Mutants.

== Career ==
Middleton started his career as a comic book artist in 2000 as penciler for CrossGen's Meridian, written by Barbara Kesel. After that, he joined a small independent British publisher, Com.x, planning to release there his creator-owned series Sky Between Branches, but only did a preview issue in early 2002, along with some other work for the publisher.

After contributing covers and short stories to Marvel's X-Men Unlimited series beginning in late 2002, he signed an exclusive contract in 2003, and created NYX with Joe Quesada as writer, but left the title after four issues in 2004 when his contract ran out.

Following his stint at Marvel he signed exclusively with DC Comics in 2004. His first DC series was Superman/Shazam: First Thunder, a miniseries that launched in September 2005. Along with illustrating some short stories and single issues, Middleton also served as regular cover artist for the Vertigo series American Virgin and DC Comics' Supergirl ongoing series.

Middleton worked as one of the conceptual artists on the 2005 science fiction film Serenity. Since then he has been working as an artist for Warner Bros. Animation. Middleton began working for WB Animation in October 2009 as a character designer, but was quickly promoted to be an art director for the Green Lantern: The Animated Series, where he has worked hand-in-hand with Bruce Timm to carve out the look and feel of the first Warner Brothers' CG television series.

In addition to his comic book work, Joshua Middleton has illustrated book covers for several major publishers, including Scholastic, Abrams, Penguin, Viking, Tor, and Disney Press. Middleton has also served as a conceptual artist/illustrator for feature films produced by Universal Studios, Warner Bros., Disney, Marvel Studios, Sony Pictures Entertainment, and Sony Pictures Animation.

In late 2010, Middleton decided to leave animation and return to his work in comics. Middleton has been the cover artist for the Aquaman and Batgirl series for DC Comics. He drew the 1980s variant cover for Action Comics #1000 (June 2018).

== Bibliography ==
- Meridian #1–6 (with Barbara Kesel, CrossGen, 2000)
- Primal #nn (with Russell Uttley and Ben Oliver, Com.x, 2002)
- X-Men Unlimited (Marvel):
  - "Sacrificial Worlds" (with Kaare Andrews, in #37, 2002)
  - "Fear" (with Nunzio DeFilippis and Christina Weir, in #42, 2003)
- Sky Between Branches #0 (script and art, Com.x, 2002)
- NYX #1–4 (with Joe Quesada, Marvel, 2003–2004)
- Street Fighter #11 (with Ken Siu-Chong, UDON, 2004)
- Wildstorm Winter Special: "The Survivor" (with Bruce Jones, one-shot, Wildstorm, 2004)
- Superman/Shazam: First Thunder (with Judd Winick, DC Comics, 2005–2006)
- Fables #53: "Porky Pine Pie" (with Bill Willingham, Vertigo, 2007)
- Outsiders: Five of a Kind: Metamorpho/Aquaman: "Rogue Elements" (with Tony Bedard and G. Willow Wilson, one-shot, DC Comics, 2007)
- Convergence: Wonder Woman #1–2 (with Larry Hama, miniseries, DC Comics, 2015)

=== Covers only ===
- X-Men Unlimited #40, 47, 49 (Marvel, 2003)
- New Mutants #1–6 (Marvel, 2003)
- Runaways #11–12 (Marvel, 2004)
- NYX #5–7 (Marvel, 2004–2005)
- Majestic #1 (Wildstorm, 2005)
- Serenity #3 (Dark Horse, 2005)
- Gotham Central #36 (DC Comics, 2006)
- American Virgin #4–14 (Vertigo, 2006–2007)
- All-Flash vol. 2 #1 (DC Comics, 2007)
- JLA: Classified #50–54 (DC Comics, 2008)
- Supergirl #34, 36–43, 45–51 (DC Comics, 2008–2009)
- Vixen: Return of the Lion #1–5 (DC Comics, 2009)
- The War that Time Forgot #8 (DC Comics, 2009)
- Wonder Woman vol. 3 #30 (DC Comics, 2009)
- Wonder Woman #611, 614 (DC Comics, 2011)
- Green Arrow vol. 5 #13–14 (DC Comics, 2011)
- Aquaman vol. 8 #1-present (DC Comics, 2016–present)
- Action Comics #1000 (DC Comics, 2018)
