= Cecilia Reyes =

Fictional character

Dr. Cecilia Reyes
- Cecilia Reyes

Publication information
- Publisher: Marvel Comics
- First appearance: X-Men (vol. 2) #65 (June 1997)
- Created by: Scott Lobdell (writer); Carlos Pacheco (artist)

In-story information
- Species: Human mutant
- Team affiliations: X-Men; Weapon X New Mutants
- Notable aliases: Forcefield
- Abilities: Ability to create a psioplasmic bio-field; Capable medical doctor and surgeon

Dr. Cecilia Reyes is a fictional character appearing in American comic books published by Marvel Comics. Created by Scott Lobdell and Carlos Pacheco, the character first appeared in X-Men (vol. 2) #65 (June 1997). She belongs to the subspecies of humans called mutants, who are born with superhuman abilities.

Raised in the Bronx by her Puerto Rican family, she is a medical doctor specializing in trauma surgery. She has the mutant ability to project a force field around her body. Unlike most X-Men, she has no interest in superheroics and desires only to live an ordinary life, having been forced into the team by circumstance. Cecilia Reyes was briefly a member of the X-Men and often works to assist them.

The character was portrayed by Alice Braga in the 2020 film The New Mutants.

== Publication history ==
Created by writer Scott Lobdell and artist Carlos Pacheco, she first appeared in X-Men (vol. 2) #65 (June 1997).

== Fictional character biography ==
Cecilia Reyes decided to become a doctor when her father was gunned down in front of her as a child, and she was unable to do anything to help him. The X-Men tried recruiting her when it was discovered that she was a mutant, but Reyes had no interest in being a superhero. She preferred to pursue her trauma surgeon career.

=== Operation Zero Tolerance ===
Following the events of "Operation: Zero Tolerance", Reyes is named an honorary member of the X-Men. She becomes involved in the X-Men's battle with the Neo, a villainous group of mutants who claimed to have evolved beyond the level of other mutants. Reyes is trapped in the Neo's fortress below New York City and uses the street drug Rave to enhance her powers, ensuring her survival. The X-Men rescue Reyes; Professor X helps her overcome her addiction to Rave during a detox period.

=== Neverland ===
Reyes appears as a prisoner at Neverland, a mutant concentration camp run by the Weapon X program. There, she attempts to use her medical expertise to help out the other prisoners. She is apparently killed when a brainwashed Agent Zero destroys the camp.

Cecilia Reyes is revealed to have survived Neverland and now volunteers at local homeless shelters. The NYX teenagers bring an injured Tatiana Caban to her for help. Sometime after these events, Reyes moves to the X-Men's new base of operations, Utopia.

=== The Five Lights ===
After the events of Second Coming, Cecilia Reyes is partnered with Psylocke and sent to Mexico City to locate the second of the Five Lights, the first mutants to manifest powers since M-Day. After sedating Gabriel Cohuelo, Reyes informs his parents of what is transpiring and offers him help from the X-Men. Psylocke comes to the room and explains that Gabriel's ability to slow time around him causes him to appear to be moving so fast that he is invisible to the naked eye. Psylocke taps into Reyes' powers to contain Gabriel until Hope Summers arrives.

=== X-23 ===
Gambit and X-23 arrive in New York City following a lead from London. Gambit is injured, with his wounds reopening later on. They visit Cecilia Reyes at her apartment, and she agrees to give Gambit stitches, but is perturbed at being disturbed and admits she left Utopia to avoid such "stupidity". X-23 picks up the scents of her friends in the apartment, and asks where they are. Reyes states that she gave them permission to stay there before she went to Utopia, but they were gone by the time she returned. X-23 leaves to pursue a lead, and the city is soon hit by a mysterious earthquake. Reyes and Gambit help rescue and treat quake victims. Reyes accompanies Gambit as he searches for X-23, eventually finding her recovering in the care of the Future Foundation.

=== Astonishing X-Men ===
Although she is still more comfortable healing humans than fighting superhumans, Cecilia Reyes is part of the new team composed by Wolverine. Alongside Northstar, Iceman, Beast, Gambit, and Warbird, she assists to Northstar's wedding and tries to help Karma, whose mind has been taken over Ms. Hatchi for yet unknown reasons. She is also carrying on a romantic relationship with Gambit.

== Powers and abilities ==
Cecilia Reyes can generate a force field described as a "psioplasmic bio-field" around her body. This force field provides superhuman durability, increasing her resistance to energy and physical attacks. She also has shown the ability to wield her forcefield as a blunt force, pushing others out of her way. She can create spikes which could punch through a human body.

Additionally, Reyes is a skilled medical doctor and surgeon.

== Reception ==
=== Critical reception ===
Marc Buxton of Den of Geek said, "Dr. Cecilia Reyes has a really cool power, the ability to cast a force field that can protect herself or others, but the true specialness of the character is her desire to be a doctor instead of a superhero. Reyes is the X-Men’s most skilled healer, a woman who seeks true service as a medical professional rather than an adventuring crusader. Reyes is one of the most underutilized but humane of all the X-Men, a woman who has a clear sense of identity and purpose beyond throwing down with Unus, the Untouchable." Karen M. Walsh, in the book Geek Heroines (2019), also commented on Reyes offering a "unique representation of a mutant and an empowering female Puerto Rican doctor" who finds her place based on her medical and intellectual skills instead of her mutant abilities. Walsh opined that while the character is often "peripheral" in the X-Men line, "she is meaningful as a superheroine in many ways". Walsh highlighted Marjorie Liu's inclusion of Reyes in NYX: No Way Home – the X-Men often act as stand-ins for the "struggles marginalized groups face in society" so Liu's portrayal of Reyes as "a mutant defined by something other than her mutant powers offers an important perspective". Walsh commented that token characters from marginalized groups often "exist solely as representations of their cultures. By focusing on Reyes' full self, NYX offered a twice-marginalized character—Latinx and Mutant—whose sense of self arose out of her choices rather than how she was born. By giving her agency, Liu's story expanded the way in which marginalized characters are written".

=== Accolades ===
- In 2014, Entertainment Weekly ranked Cecilia Reyes 95th in their "Let's rank every X-Man ever" list.
- In 2014, BuzzFeed ranked Cecilia Reyes 49th in their "95 X-Men Members Ranked From Worst To Best" list.
- In 2017, Den of Geek included Cecilia Reyes in their "40 X-Men Characters Who Haven’t Appeared in the Movies But Should" list.
- In 2019, CBR.com ranked Cecilia Reyes ranked 10th in their "Ranking All The Members Of NYX" list.
- In 2020, Scary Mommy included Cecilia Reyes in their "Looking For A Role Model? These 195+ Marvel Female Characters Are Truly Heroic" list.
- In 2020, CBR.com ranked Cecilia Reyes 5th in their "Doctors Unite! The Doctors Of Marvel Comics" list and 10th in their "10 Best Superhero Doctors In Marvel & DC" list.
- In 2022, Newsarama included Cecilia Reyes in their "20 X-Men characters that should make the jump from Marvel comics to the MCU" list.
- In 2022, Screen Rant included Cecilia Reyes in their "10 Best Doctors In Marvel Comics" list.
- In 2022, CBR.com ranked Cecilia Reyes 3rd in their "X-Men Who Deserve Their Own Spinoff Films" list.

== In other media ==
Dr. Cecilia Reyes appears in The New Mutants, portrayed by Alice Braga. This version works for the Essex Corporation, who tasked her with monitoring potential recruits, until she is killed by the Demon Bear.
