= Crux (comics) =

American comic book series

- Cover to Crux #1

Publication information
- Publisher: CrossGen
- Schedule: Monthly
- Format: Ongoing series
- Publication date: May 2001 - February 2004
- Main character(s): Capricia; Galvan; Zephyre; Verityn; Tug; Gammid

Crux is an American comic book published by CrossGen Entertainment from May 2001 to February 2004. It was cancelled due to bankruptcy in 2004. Crux was one of the later titles that came first in a sort of second wave of Crossgen titles which included Sojourn and Brath. It detailed the exploits of six Atlanteans who were put into stasis and are awoken 100,000 years later.

== Plot synopsis ==
The main story arc centered on Capricia and the other Atlanteans efforts to revive the remaining Atlanteans still in stasis and to find out what happened to the human race, and perhaps to a latter extent how to go through 'transition' themselves. The group go through a series of battles with Negation forces who eventually attempt a full-scale invasion of Earth.

During this time the group come across Australia hidden from the outside world due to a gigantic tachyon supercollider and find a 'transition' portal with humans getting ready to go through. They are attacked by a Negation squad leaving Tug blind for a time. Tug and Verityn then come across a 100,000-year-old Atlantean named Aristophanes, a legend they had heard stories about as children. The group also feels the loss of Gammid to the Negation Universe via 'transition' portal which was meant to lead him and the remaining humans found in Australia to a "higher plane of existence" but instead takes them to the Negation Universe.

They meet a couple of 'cowboys' who aren't who they appear to be during one of Danik's tests and Terra Cognito feature considerably giving information on Earth and the state of the local galaxy. The twins relationship is explored throughout, detailing their rivalry and their relationship with Zephyre. Capricia and Danik come to an eventual understanding and by the end of the series the motives of Danik are evident throughout all of the Sigilverse titles.

The group eventually revive the remaining Atlanteans just in time to mount an offensive against closing Negation forces. The series ends with the defeat of the Negation invasion of Earth, the mustering of Atlanteans by Danik and Capricia impregnated by Samandahl Rey (from Sigil title).

== Storyline details ==
=== Pre-transition ===
Around 10,000 years before the birth of Christ there existed on Earth a race of human beings called Atlanteans. They were a race that evolved thousands of years before humankind and had finally reached the pinnacle of their civilisation. They inhabited the ancient city known as Atlantis. Atlantis was known as Atlan during an epoch where Atlantean society was of the warrior caste and battle was common. Atlantean society eventually developed into a society based on five disciplines which became the founding principles of Atlantean society. The five disciplines were Mind, Body, Spirit, Passion and Empathy.

As they had become advanced both scientifically and spiritually many Atlanteans thought it time to move onto a higher plane of existence, an event known as "transition". While many agreed others were still tied to their role as caretakers of the human race. Most Atlanteans believed that human beings would one day evolve to a level equal to that of the Atlanteans and that they would eventually be able to undergo a "transition" of their own. Those Atlanteans that would choose to remain behind would undergo "transition" with the human race when they finally achieved that goal.

As the two concepts of "transition" and humankind's well-being were of equal importance to the Atlanteans they choose to address both issues. Some chose to remain behind, to be placed into protective stasis during the process of transition, while most underwent "transition" and ascended to a higher plane of existence, albeit in an overwhelming orgy of energy that would damage all stasis tubes, impeding revival protocols, and also cause the city of Atlantis to sink deep under the sea, lost for 100,000 years.

=== Post-transition ===
100,000 years later an Atlantean known as Capricia is revived underwater by a strange man. Quickly tossed into a battle by this unknown benefactor Capricia is forced to quickly choose which of her fellow Atlanteans she should nominate for revival. Taking into account the five Atlantean disciplines Capricia chooses five Atlanteans, each of whom have mastery over their chosen discipline. Twin brothers Gammid and Galvan each of whom control one end of the electromagnetic spectrum, Zephyre for her super-speed, Verityn for his insight and Tug for his telekinetic expertise. Together they defeat their first foe in 100,000 years.

== Crux members ==
- Capricia, empath, also exhibited as the "Changeling" ability or better, changing to how one feels (student of Empathy)
- Galvan (Orange), Gammid's twin brother, controls one end of the electromagnetic spectrum: Infrared (student of Passion)
- Gammid (Blue), Galvan's twin brother, controls the other end of the electromagnetic spectrum: Ultraviolet (student of Passion)
- Tug, telekinetic, powerhouse (student of the Mind)
- Verityn, seer, powerful telepath, can observe space in time. Youngest member of the team, still a boy (student of the Spirit)
- Zephyre, possesses incredible speed (student of the Body)
- Geromi (suspected real name Jeremy due to pronunciation problems Atlanteans have with English), not an actual member of Crux, nor is he Atlantean, Geromi nevertheless is involved with the team from almost the very beginning and helps out the Atlanteans on numerous occasions.

== Creators ==
- Mark Waid, writer
- Steve Epting, illustrator
- Rick Magyar, illustrator
- Frank D'Armata, illustrator
- Troy Peteri, letterer

== Books ==
CrossGen released three trade paperback books containing the first part of the series:

- Crux Volume 1: Atlantis Rising
- Crux Volume 2: Test of Time
- Crux Volume 3: Strangers in Atlantis

In addition CrossGen announced two more books but these were never published due to CrossGen's bankruptcy:

- Crux Volume 4: Chaos Reborn
- Crux Volume 5: Resurrection
