= Meridian (comics) =

Comic book series

- Cover to Meridian #1

Publication information
- Publisher: CrossGen Comics
- Schedule: Monthly
- Format: Ongoing series
- Publication date: July 2000 – April 2004
- No. of issues: 44
- Main character(s): Sephie of Meridian; Ilahn of Cadador; Turos

Creative team
- Created by: Mark Alessi; Gina M. Villa
- Written by: Barbara Kesel
- Penciller(s): Joshua Middleton; Steve McNiven

Meridian is a comic book series published by CrossGen Comics. It was written by Barbara Kesel, and penciled by a number of artists including Joshua Middleton and Steve McNiven. Meridian ran for 44 issues, from July of 2000 to April of 2004.

== Storyline details ==
Meridian, the series' namesake, is one of many island city-states upon the world of Demetria. At some point in the world's history, a great natural cataclysm threw massive chunks of earth into the sky, creating the current system of floating islands. The islands, as well as the airships crucial to trade and transport, defy gravity due to the mysterious properties of a certain 'ore' which is not named. Each island is headed by a Minister, who has more or less monarchic power over their respective island, and while many communities still survive on the surface, contact and trade between the surface and the islands is rare.

The main character of the series is Sephie, the daughter of Turos, the Minister of Meridian. Her childhood friend Jad Takarty is in love with her. Her father dies at the beginning of the series, and Sephie becomes Minister of Meridian, acquiring at the same time a mysterious Sigil, a mark upon her forehead, which grants her an array of powers. Gradually, she learns to use it to allow her to fly, to heal others, to repair things, and in a handful of other ways. Her uncle Ilahn, Minister of Cadador, another of the floating island city-states, also has a Sigil, which allows him to destroy things and teleport. He attempts to use his powers, and his significant political influence, to seize Meridian from Sephie's control, and to create an economic and industrial empire, demanding tribute from other islands, if not conquering them outright.

Sephie sets out to stop him. After learning more about her powers and her family's past, acquiring equipment and support, and meeting new friends and allies, she sets about perpetrating piracy upon her uncle's trade routes and fights him directly on a number of occasions.

As with most of the core CrossGen titles, Meridian crosses over into the other titles to some extent, and into the underlying 'uberplot' that connects all the core titles together. While not fully central to the conflict between Sephie and her uncle Ilahn, there are appearances by members of The First who are the Gods of the CrossGen universe, as well as by Samandahl Rey, the main hero of the title Sigil, and others. In the end, Sephie and Ilahn join the heroes (and villains) of the other core titles to fight an enemy called "the Negation" in a limited series called Negation War, which was left unfinished when CrossGen filed for bankruptcy in the middle of 2004.

The background of the series is expanded upon in CrossGen Chronicles #3, which concerns the early life of Turos and Ilahn.

== Collections ==
Four trade paperbacks compiling the story arcs of Meridian were released before the bankruptcy of Crossgen:

- Meridian Volume 1: Flying Solo - issues #1-7
- Meridian Volume 2: Going to Ground - issues #8-14
- Meridian Volume 3: Taking the Skies - issues #15-20
- Meridian Volume 4: Coming Home - issues #21-26

The next three collections were solicited, but never published:

- Meridian Volume 5: Minister of Cadador - issues #27-32
- Meridian Volume 6: Changing Course - issues #33-38
- Meridian Volume 7: The Mystery of Sheristan - issues #39-44

There was also a small 5.5in x 8in "Traveller" edition of Volume 1 released.
