= Brath =

Comic Book

- Cover to Brath #1

Publication information
- Publisher: CrossGen Entertainment
- Schedule: Monthly
- Publication date: February 2003 – June 2004
- No. of issues: 14 (plus a prequel)
- Main character(s): Brath Mac Garen; Taniella; Bryllin; S'math; Quintillius Aurelius Galba Rex

Creative team
- Created by: Mark Alessi; Gina M. Villa
- Written by: Chuck Dixon
- Penciller(s): Andrea Di Vito; Enrique Alcatena (6, 11)
- Inker(s): Roland Paris; Brad Vancata
- Letterer: David Lanphear
- Colorist(s): Andrew Crossley; Rob Schwager; Jason Keith

Collected editions
- Hammer of Vengeance: ISBN 1-931484-87-2
- Gladiator Triumphant: ISBN 1593140452

Brath is an American comic book published by CrossGen Entertainment from February 2003 to June 2004. It ran for 15 issues (including the prequel) before the series had to end due to CrossGen's bankruptcy in 2004.

The series is written by Chuck Dixon, and penciled by Andrea Di Vito. Brath is set in the fictional world of Hann Jin, which is also seen in other CrossGen titles such as Way of the Rat and The Path. Dixon and DiVito researched various parts of history when writing Brath. As such, much of Brath's diegesis is akin to films like Gladiator and Braveheart.

== Plot ==
Brath Mac Garen Bradmanacus, who is the tongue of the empire, unites the clans of the Urelanders when the Empire comes to conquer the lands of Ure. Marked with the sign of the Stag god, Brath, and his army defy the legions of the emperor time and again.

The battle of Irisium teaches the empire the cunningness of Brath and his clansmen. Upon defeating the legions of Galba, Brath lets the prisoners of that battle go free, despite the reluctance of his clansmen, returning the banner of the Eagle of the Thirteenth to its First Century Antonius Casta. Upon returning, Casta is asked why he thinks Brath let him and his men go. Casta replies, "Because he knew it was more humiliating to let us live, and we bear witness to his victory".

As the months draw on Brath and the clan of Mac Garen's men conduct lightning raids against the forces of the empire. At the same time Drusus, tribune to General Vala, is attempting to locate Dun Garen, home of Brath Mac Garen. As tension grows between the clans, Brath begins to fear that the alliance may falter. Challenged by A'Dan Mac Dool for the right of leadership, Brath accepts and kills Mac Dool. But the fight between the two sparks the fires of treachery.

While tribesmen argue and legions form, Brath dreams. The advance towards Dun Garen, that Brath sees in his dreams is now a reality. General Vala and three legions march towards the hills that the Mac Garen's call home. Brath is alerted to the armies amassing ashore, and upon seeing the amassing army with his own eyes, he is greeted by that which he has never seen before. Great beasts with long trunks and huge tusks are being escorted ashore, and Brath fears that with no defense against such creatures, Dun Garen will surely fall.

== Setting ==
In the world of Hann Jinn, emperor Quintillius Aurelius Galba Rex rules his empire with an iron will. The lands of the empire stretch from the deserts of Bythium to the cold wastes of the Tandar Steppe. His legions march the lands to enforce his will, taxing the citizens beyond their ability to yield, enforcing his glory and the glory of his great capital city. Yet one land and one people remain beyond the grasp of the emperor, the clans of the Urelanders.

Brath narrates the tale of the Urelanders, who were assembled under the direction of the war chief Brath Mac Garen in an uneasy alliance, as they struggle against the ever-expanding reign of the emperor Quintillius Aurelius Galba Rex.

== Collected editions ==
The series has been collected in a number of trade paperbacks:

1. Hammer of Vengeance (CrossGen, 160 pages, September 2004, ISBN 1-931484-87-2)
2. Gladiator Triumphant (CrossGen, 160 pages, September 2004, ISBN 1-59314-045-2)

== See also ==
- Negation War
