= Jeff Johnson (artist) =

American comic book artist

Johnson's cover for Wonder Man #9 (May 1992)

Jeffrey Johnson is an American comic book artist, known for his work on publications such as Marvel Comics' Wonder Man, The Amazing Spider-Man, and Weapon X. Earlier in his career, he illustrated Malibu Comics' Solitaire and Crossgen's Way of the Rat, and has also illustrated books for DC Comics, including Green Lantern.

== Career ==
Jeff Johnson was about to begin a collaboration with Ron Marz on The Dragon Prince but he was hired by an animation studio. He subsequently worked on animated television series including Boondocks, Spectacular Spider-Man, Batman: The Brave and the Bold, Young Justice and Transformers: Prime.

Johnson's book Draw Fight Scenes Like a Pro was published by Watson-Guptill in 2006.

== Personal life ==
On March 15, 2008, Johnson married novelist Megan Crane at the Laguna Cliffs Marriott Resort and Spa in Dana Point, California. The ceremony was performed by Johnson's fellow comics artist, Dan Panosian, and Panosian's wife, Elena, who became Universal Life ministers for the event.
