= Negation War =

Comic book series

Publication information
- Publisher: CrossGen Comics
- Publication date: 2004
- No. of issues: 2
- Main character: Sigil-Bearers (including Mighty Man)

Negation War is a comic book series published by CrossGen Comics, and serving as a culmination of the metaplots of nearly all of CrossGen's other titles. It was cancelled after only two issues, in spring 2004, before the company declared bankruptcy and ended production on all their titles. It was intended to answer many, if not all, of the questions surrounding CrossGen's metaplot, allowing the company to move on to new titles and perhaps a new company-wide metaplot.

== Plot ==
The events of Negation War revolve around the invasion of CrossGen's Sigilverse, i.e. the mainstream universe where all the other titles take place, by the forces of an alternate universe known as the Negation. The Sigil-Bearers, the protagonists of the core titles, led by the Atlantean Danik, are brought together to serve the purpose for which the Sigil was created: to fight off the Negation, led by the god-emperor Charon and his new consort/queen Evinlea.

Negation War reveals some of the key mysteries of the CrossGen metaplot, continuing from the revelations of the later issues of Negation. Charon and his opposite counterpart Appolyon, are revealed to have been the human scientists who organized the Great Transition as seen in Crux. Charon secretly engineered the device to impart him with incredible god-like power, even as the rest of the human race ascended to a higher form themselves. The transition also sent the pair into another universe, which came to be known as the Negation; Charon took command of this universe, building it into a massive intergalactic empire, and imprisoning the slightly less powerful Appolyon.

After meeting Appolyon, several of the characters from the Negation title travel to Han-Jin, the world depicted in Brath, Way of the Rat and The Path. Meanwhile, Samandahl Rey, hero of Sigil, is sent by Danik to gather the Sigil-Bearers.

The series ends with a cliffhanger, as Evinlea leads the Negation assault on Elysia, home of The First. There, the first god to die is Raamia, Altwaal's former consort.

Information concerning what was to occur in the remaining issues to tie up the plot has not been released.
