= Chimera (CrossGen) =

2003 American comic book

- Chimera #1

Publication information
- Publisher: CrossGen Entertainment, inc.
- Schedule: Bi-monthly
- Format: Limited series
- Publication date: March - July 2003
- No. of issues: 4

Creative team
- Created by: Ron Marz and Brandon Peterson
- Written by: Ron Marz and Brandon Peterson
- Artist(s): Brandon Peterson

Chimera is an American comic book published by CrossGen from March to July 2003. It is a miniseries that ran for four issues. Produced by Brandon Peterson, the artwork is a blend of traditional and computer-enhanced techniques.

== Plot ==
Sara Janning is an adult woman living on the planet Serevan. She grew up on an agricultural outpost on Yamivol Prime, a world which was targeted for habitation by the Chimeran Imperium when Sara was young. Her home was destroyed, her family killed, and her dog was vaporized before her eyes. The trauma from this event caused Sara to release the power of her Sigil, which wiped out all the Chimeran forces on Yamivol Prime.

Since this incident, she has been hiding from the Chimeran Imperium on Serevan, where she works cutting gigantic blocks out of the ice. One day, returning from work, Sara is approached by a new arrival to the planet, Jason Bryce, with whom she has an intense conversation.

Sara returns home where her friend Isaiah, a scientist who helped her to hide from the Imperium, has been working on a robot called a Carapoid. The robot was left behind by an ancient race called The Progenitors. Sara names it 'Rover' and treats it as a pet.

The next day when she arrives at work, Sara is again approached by Jason Bryce. When clocking in, Bryce's DNA is detected by the Chimeran Imperium, which results in the Imperium mobilizing a fleet to head to Serevan.

Unaware of the approaching fleet, Sara heads out onto the ice with Jason Bryce as her partner. While searching for tritium, Rover unexpectedly unleashes a laser from its optical lens. As the laser begins to burn a hole in the ice, the ground starts to shake. With the ground giving way, the trio falls into a dark hole. When they wake up, they find themselves in front of a buried ship, later revealed to be a ship of The Progenitors.
