= NYX (2003 series) =

Comic book series

- Cover to NYX #7 by Josh Middleton. Clockwise from top left: X-23, Tatiana and Kiden.

Publication information
- Publisher: Marvel Comics
- Format: (vol. 1); Limited series; (No Way Home)
- Genre: Superhero
- Publication date: (vol. 1); 2003 – 2005; (No Way Home); 2008 – 2009
- No. of issues: (vol. 1); 7; (No Way Home); 6
- Main characters: List: (vol. 1); Cameron Palmer; Hector Morales; Kara; Kiden Nixon; Laura Kinney; Nick Nixon; Tatiana Caban; Zebra Daddy; (No Way Home); Bobby Soul; Cameron Palmer; Kiden Nixon; Lil' Bro; Nick Nixon; Tatiana Caban

Creative team
- Written by: (vol. 1); Joe Quesada; (No Way Home); Marjorie Liu
- Pencillers: List: (vol. 1); Joshua Middleton (#1–4); Rob Teranishi (#5–7); (No Way Home); Kalman Andrasofszky; Sara Pichelli (#3–4)
- Inkers: List: (vol. 1); Joshua Middleton (#1–4); Chris Sotomayor (#5–7); Mark Nelson (#5, 7); (No Way Home); Kalman Andrasofzsky (#1); Ramón Pérez (#2–6); Sara Pichelli (#3–4, 6)
- Letterers: List: (vol. 1); Chris Eliopoulos (#1); Randy Gentile (#3); (No Way Home); Joe Caramagna; Chris Eliopoulos (#4)
- Colorists: List: (vol. 1); Jean-Francois Beaulieu (#1, 3–4); Joshua Middleton (#2); Chris Sotomayor (#5–7); Felix Serrano (#5, 7); (No Way Home); John Raunch
- Editors: List: (vol. 1); Jean-Francois Beaulieu; MacKenzie Cadenhead; (No Way Home); John Barber; Michael Horwitz

NYX is a limited series of comic books by Marvel Comics, consisting of seven issues, published between 2003 and 2005. It is written by Joe Quesada with art by Joshua Middleton (issues #1–4) and Rob Teranishi (issues #5–7). NYX stands for District X, New York City.

The series features homeless teenage mutants in New York City: time-freezing Kiden, shape-shifting Tatiana, body-shifting Bobby, his mysterious brother Lil Bro, the female clone of Wolverine (X-23), and Cameron, a woman with no powers. The third issue of the series featured the first comic book appearance of X-23, who was created for the animated series X-Men: Evolution. Although the series was cancelled in 2005, a sequel 6-issue miniseries titled NYX: No Way Home was released in 2009.

A second volume was published from July 2024 to April 2025 as part of the X-Men: From the Ashes event which relaunches the X-Men line. The series focuses on former X-Men students and Kamala Khan as they adapt to life in New York City in the post-Krakoan Age, where mutants are hated and feared even more due to the actions of Orchis. Laura Kinney (formerly X-23) and Kiden Nixon are the only returning characters.

== Publication history ==
In 2001, writer Brian Wood developed a concept of the series for Marvel with artist David Choe that was to launch Marvel's MAX imprint. The ongoing series, focusing on the characters and how their powers affect their lives, friends and family, was to star Gambit, Rogue, and Jubilee, as well as Angie and Purge, two new characters Wood had created for the series. After Marvel aborted the project, deeming it not suitable for their audience, Wood used parts of this concept for his series Demo.

The series ended up being developed and written by Joe Quesada with art by Joshua Middleton (issues #1–4) and Rob Teranishi (issues #5–7). Quesada told Dana Jennings of The New York Times that "almost everything you see in NYX is based on something I know or have seen firsthand". Jennings highlighted that Quesada's "idea for NYX came the way lots of New York writers used to get their ideas, outside a saloon":

''I was at the Ace Bar in Alphabet City,'' he says, ''and I saw these 15-year-old squatters eating discarded bread.'' The scene haunted him, and evolved into NYX. ''With comic books, you look at real-life situations and try to find the right metaphor,'' Mr. Quesada says. ''You ask yourself, 'What if we took the world of the X-Men and shrunk it down?' What if your concern was, 'When am I going to eat next,' even if you do have superpowers?''

NYX was planned as an ongoing series, but later was shortened to a miniseries. Throughout the entire publication, there were often long delays between issues because Quesada had always been late with scripts. The first five issues of the series were reprinted in two Marvel Must Haves issues in the summer of 2005, before the sixth issue was released in July. The seventh and last issue was released in September 2005.

=== Failed spin-off ===
A second series of NYX was planned for release in 2007, but never materialized.

=== NYX: No Way Home ===
At the 2008 New York Comic Con, a new NYX series was officially announced to launch in August 2008. NYX: No Way Home is written by Marjorie M. Liu, with art by Kalman Andrasofszky.

Cecilia Reyes makes an appearance in NYX: No Way Home #4.

== Synopsis ==
=== Wannabe ===
The series starts with a flashback during which Kiden's father is killed during a drive-by shooting while he and Kiden are getting ice cream. Switching to the present, Kiden is an emotionally disturbed teenager who gets into an altercation with another student who is a Latin King gangbanger. She manifests her mutant power during a fight and unintentionally breaks the student's arm. He returns with a gun and she freezes time again before the bullet hits her, but it hits her teacher, Mrs. Cameron, instead. Several months later Cameron, whose life has fallen apart as a result of the incident, attempts to commit suicide. Kiden shows up and rescues her after receiving a warning from the ghost of her father. A second vision tells them to visit the Hotel Brasil, where they find X-23, who is working as a prostitute, in a compromising position: standing over her john whose suicide she has just witnessed. The three escape together, but X-23's pimp is upset and sends a hit squad to Cameron's apartment. Again, the ghost of Kiden's father warns them, just in time, to leave. Later they bump into Tatiana, who has turned into a dog-beast after touching a puppy that was hit by a car. Tatiana is able to scare away a mob after killing a cat and turning into a werecat. The runaways form a crew and live on the streets, begging for money and dumpster diving for food. Eventually they decide to return to Cameron's apartment to find money and leave town. X-23's pimp, Zebra Daddy, tracks them down with the help of a banger named Felon, but again Kiden's father appears and warns them. During the confrontation at Cameron's apartment, X-23 kills most of the pimp's gang before getting gunned down by Zebra Daddy. Cameron falls out her apartment window, and Kiden then must decide whether to kill Zebra Daddy (who it turns out was her father's shooter) or save Cameron. Remembering how Cameron had taken a bullet for her, she opts to save her. Zebra Daddy is about to kill them but X-23 heals from her wounds and executes him. The team leaves together. In the denouement, it turns out Felon's little brother is also a mutant, and it was he who created the apparitions of Kiden's father. Kiden sends a letter to her mother, but the postman just misses her as she is moving out of NYC.

=== No Way Home ===
This series starts with Kiden, Tatiana, Bobby, and Lil' Bro living with Mrs. Cameron. Kiden is still looking for her parents. They come home one day to find Cameron's apartment empty, ransacked, and covered in blood. They escape before the police arrive, but Kiden returns and finds clues to local gang banger D'Sean. While investigating his apartment, a scuffle breaks out. Tatiana bites D'Sean and shapeshifts into his likeness, then gets shot by D'Sean. Bobby knocks him out, but his gang comes in and starts a shoot-out. Kiden freezes time while holding Bobby, Lil' Bro, and Tatiana, who are able, then, to join her in the time-freeze. They take Tatiana to a hospital. The doctors realize she is a mutant when a blood transfusion makes her change shape into the donor, then call S.H.I.E.L.D. Kiden and Bobby find the gang leader. Bobby is forced to use his power to subdue him, but then loses most of his memories. Kiden, Bobby, and Lil' Bro then return to the hospital to rescue Tatiana. She hasn't fully recovered from her injuries, so they turn to Cecilia Reyes for help, but run away after they grow suspicious of her. Kiden then decides to track down Mrs. Palmer on her own after confronting a mysterious lady who is immune to Kiden's time-freezing powers. It turns out that Mrs. Palmer was used as bait to trap the team and exploit their mutant powers, assisted by the ghost of Kiden's dead father. As her father died, he saw into the future and realized that there is only one possible future in which Kiden survives, so he comes back to Earth as a ghost. He makes a deal with a mysterious organization to ensure her survival, but their plan is that only Kiden will survive. Tatiana is able to sneak out by drinking the blood of a mysterious "Sniper Chick" and posing as her. Lil' Bro kills her using one of his apparitions. It turns out the mysterious woman is also the daughter of the leader of the secret facility. Mr. Nixon's ghost apologizes for Kiden killing his daughter, and the man seems indifferent to his own daughter's death since he was able to see Lil' Bro's apparitions cause physical harm. He promises not to hurt Kiden, but will continue to monitor the team. The team escapes the facility and drops Mrs. Palmer at a hospital. They then vow to stay together and to "keep surviving".

== Main characters ==
=== Volume 1 and No Way Home ===
- Kiden Nixon – Mutant with the ability to slow down time and speed up her personal time line. Also sometimes thought to have precognitive abilities because Felon's "lil bro" used his abilities of projection to manipulate her during the story.
- Tatiana Caban – Mutant with the ability to shapeshift into any animal or human whose blood she touches.
- Cameron Palmer - Kiden Nixon's former teacher. She is a human. When she attempted suicide, Kiden saved her and roped her into the X-23 situation.
- Bobby Soul – Mutant with the ability to project his consciousness into other individuals and take control of their bodies. A side effect is that he suffers from varying degrees of amnesia after returning to his own body. He is also known as Felon.
- Lil' Bro – Bobby Soul's mute, autistic little brother. He is shown to have unknown psionic abilities that are somehow connected to Kiden's visions of the ghost of her dead father. It is insinuated that he became non-responsive after having been sexually abused by one of his mother's boyfriends.
- X-23 – Mutant with adamantium claws and regenerative healing factor. She works as a prostitute who specializes in cutting masochistic patrons. She rarely speaks and is known to engage in self-abuse (specifically, cutting).
- Zebra Daddy – X-23's pimp. He claims to love her more than any of his other 'merchandise', but he doesn't even know her name and ultimately views her as disposable property.
- Hector Morales – Kiden's school enemy, who repeatedly attacks her, though always failing to make an impact, and even tries (and fails) to kill her. He winds up in prison.
- Sniper Chick – A new character introduced in the second volume. Not much is known about her except that she is immune to Kiden's time-freezing powers and is the daughter of the head of the organization that attempts to kidnap the team.
- Nick Nixon – Kiden's police officer father, killed during a drive-by. He returns from the dead and initiates the events that bring the teens together; some of the visions of him are as a ghost, as explained in No Way Home, and some are Lil' Bro's psychic projections (in Wannabe).
- Kara – Kiden's best friend before she ran away.

== Reception ==
Joshua Middleton was nominated for the 2004 "Best Cover Artist" Eisner Award for his work on Marvel's NYX, X-Men Unlimited, and New Mutants. The New York Times reported that the series debut had "strong reviews in the fan press".

The series' initial portrayal of Laura Kinney as an underage prostitute was poorly received by fans and critics, with the character's creator Craig Kyle also criticizing the creative decision. Matthew Peterson, in a 2020 retrospective review of NYX #3 for Major Spoilers, opined that the issue "desperately wants to have the grittiness and reality of 'The Wire', but ended up a poorly conceived Christi MacNicol after-school special, and no amount of Middleton talent could make this script work, culminating in a disappointing and skeeved-out 1.5 out of 5 stars overall". Peterson commented that "the creative decisions of 2000s Marvel were aimed more at creating controversy and outrage" instead of "storytelling, which is why we see cartoon hero X-23 debuting as an underage prostitute in a skeevy hotel in New York City" where the introduction sequence is "distasteful for a number of reasons, even if you're sex-work-positive, but the most off-putting part of it is how matter-of-fact and dull it is, as though the only point to including the sequence was to create pearl-clutching moments and get people talking".

In 2008, critics from IGN reviewed the series NYX: No Way Home. Daniel Crown gave issue #1 a score of 6.3 out of 10. Jesse Schedeen gave issue #2 a score of 7.8 out of 10 and issue 3 a score of 8.5 out of 10. Schedeen commented that the original volume of NYX "is remembered more for dragging X-23 kicking and screaming into the comics than for its hard-hitting glimpse into the lives of mutant outcasts, even if it did the latter reasonably well" and, given the issues with X-Men line, "the time is ripe for a small series like NYX to return and surprise readers. Much to her credit, writer Marjorie Liu has wasted no time in doing just that". Schedeen viewed Liu's greatest "strength" as portraying "the main characters as believable teens without resorting to the Juno treatment" and that "Kalman Adrasofzsky continues to impress, thanks to a style that both hearkens back to Josh Middelton's work while also striking its own tone. [...] NYX may be the only one of the books that I would unequivocally recommend to all readers". Karen M. Walsh, in the book Geek Heroines (2019), highlighted Liu's inclusion of Cecilia Reyes in the series – "within the Marvel universe, the X-Men often represent the struggles marginalized groups face in society. Liu's representation, therefore, of a mutant defined by something other than her mutant powers offers an important perspective". Walsh commented that token characters from marginalized groups often "exist solely as representations of their cultures. By focusing on Reyes' full self, NYX offered a twice-marginalized character—Latinx and Mutant—whose sense of self arose out of her choices rather than how she was born. By giving her agency, Liu's story expanded the way in which marginalized characters are written".

== Collected editions ==
Title	Material collected	Published date	ISBN
NYX: Wannabe	NYX #1-7	May 2006	978-0785112433
NYX: No Way Home	NYX: No Way Home #1-6	June 2009	978-0785139966
NYX: The Complete Collection	NYX #1-7, NYX: No Way Home #1-6	July 2016	978-0785195986
NYX: Gallery Edition	NYX #1-7, NYX: No Way Home #1-6	September 2024	978-1302959067
