= The Crossovers =

Standing against corruption and poverty

Publication information
- Publisher: CrossGen Comics; Code6 Comics
- Schedule: Monthly
- Genre: Humor/comedy
- Publication date: Feb. 2003 - Dec. 2003
- No. of issues: 9
- Main character(s): Carter Crossover (Archetype); Calista Crossover; Cris Crossover; Clifford "Cliff" Crossover

Creative team
- Created by: Robert Rodi
- Written by: Robert Rodi
- Penciller(s): Mauricet (#1-6); Joe Staton (#7-9)
- Inker: Ernie Colón
- Letterer: Troy Peteri
- Colorist: Mark Mcnabb
- Editor(s): Chuck Dixon; Ian M. Feller

The Crossovers is a comic book series created in 2003 by Robert Rodi (writer), Mauricet (penciller #1-6) and Ernie Colón (inker), and published by CrossGen. The comics are self-referential and multi-genre satire.

== Publication history ==
The series is composed of two storylines: "Cross Current" (The Crossovers #1-6) and "Cross Your Hearts" (The Crossovers #7-9). The illustrator Joe Staton substitutes the Belgian penciller Mauricet in the second storyline.

A third storyline named "Cross Path" (The Crossovers #10-12) was scheduled to be released in October to December 2003.

== Plot ==
The stories center around a singular family, the Crossovers, all four members of whom are involved in different genres of sci-fi/fantasy. Carter, the father, is a typical superhero named Archetype, with strength and flight. Calista, the mother, fights vampires and other supernatural menaces. Cris, the daughter, through a portal in the basement, visits a sword and sorcery land to become the warrior princess Eradika and lead her forces into and out of battles. Clifford, the 10-year-old son, disgruntled, becomes involved with a small alien force. Eventually, all four aspects of their secretive lives come crashing together, sometimes literally, endangering many.

=== Cross Currents ===
The Crossovers family lives in Crosstown. Carter is a top executive, his wife Calista, a home hospice worker. They have two children, Cris, 15, and Cliff, 10 and a dachshund Cubby. They begin their day with breakfast like all normal families. Each member has a secret life that none of the others know. Carter is Archetype, a superhero created by Biotix with enemies such as Mountebank, a droïd creator. Calista is a vampire slayer trying to save the young Andata Enfier from Baron Arcan Corpescu, a vampire. Cris knows a secret passage in the basement which can lead her to another world where she is warrior princess Eradika who fights with the Bellekosin, a rebel group, against the evil Imperatrix Tyranna. Cliff is a UFO abductee and alien collaborator whom Perry Noia, the neighbor, tries to reveal as a traitor. These things begin to change with four events. Mountebank discovers Archetype's alter ego during a fight between the super-hero and a droïd, who passes as Gargantujuan. Baron Arcan Corpescu, old enemy of Calista, learns that she is married and declares that it wants to meet her family. Eradika's general Gash is a traitor who is plotting against her. Cliff is helping to infiltrate two aliens P:pc and S[s] from an alien race Uù.

Calista gives crucifix sheets to everyone in the house. The Crossovers parents speak about safety, but none of them, parents and children, could fully talk about the subject without revealing their secret identities. Carter is afraid that his wife suspects him to be Archetype while she worries he has realized she is hunting vampires. Mountebank decides to send an automaton against Cliff, the more vulnerable. P:pc and S[s] disintegrate the robot with their ray gun. Then Mountebank decides to concentrate on Calista instead. Archetype asked the Biotix staff for family protection. They decide to call "the old man". Cris disappears, one day, into the other world. Eradika lost a battle against the Imperatrix. Gash is among the missing. The wizard Hocus announces that her defeat was foretold in a prophecy. Corpescu succeeded in drinking more blood from Andata Enfier after seducing her so she leaves the room. He is targeting Calista and her family. After a strange dream, Calista awakes with the Baron's bite on her neck.

Calista treats her wounds with a crucifix. Prototype, Archetype's predecessor, comes back in service to help protect Carter's family. Mountebank sent a robot beast against Calista. She works in the Enfier Manor, treating Andata for vampirism when he makes interruption. She wins the battle with her crossbow. In Hocus' prophecy, Eradika will defeat Tyranna by transforming herself and with a dragon's help. P:pc and S[s] try to avoid Perry Noia who enters the house. Hiding in the basement, the senior scout, P:pc fell into Eradika's world where he is captured by Gash, the traitor. Perry Noia, chased by Cubby, caught sight of S[s] from outside the house. The Archetype exited the house from the same room. Perry thinks that Archetype is an alien shape-shifter. In the high school science lab, Clifford invented a device for dispersing alien mind control spores. Before he could use it, the Baron Corpescu attacks him.

The vampire left him alive as he could not drink the boy's blood because it has been changed by the aliens. Unmarked, the young boy is transported by Prototype—while Archetype goes searching for Cris—to Enfier Manor where his mother could look after him. Cliff meets Andata Enfier and falls in love. Corpescu attacks Cris. Archetype is delayed by an encounter with two villains, Strum and Drang. Wounded, Cris reaches her portal to the other dimension. Carter, unable to find her in the house sent Cubby—who is also Barketype, a super-dog—on her trail. Cubby jumps into the portal. Perry Noia helps Mountebank by offering his garage as a base of operations. At S[s]'s request, the Uù sent warships to encircle Earth. P:pc joins forces with the evil Imperatrix. Eradika arrives during the battle between the army and the Bellekosin. Gash abducted her and took her to Tyranna. Eradika, infected by Corpescu's bite, begins to change into a vampire.

Cliff protects Andata from Baron Corpescu by giving her some of his alien serum. From the neighbor's garage, Mountebank launches a large group of automatons at the Crossover house. Cris Crossover, in her vampiric form, defeats the Imperatrix army with the help of the "dragon" Barketype. For unknown reasons, she recovers her human form. As Calista and Mr. Enfier argue about the way to treat Andata, Cliff's serum cures her completely. The Crossovers leave the Enfier home; Andata is then called outside by Baron Corpescu who bites her but he can not drink her now protected blood. Tyranna, with the help of P:pc, leads a squadron into the earth reality. The alien warships are descending on Crosstown to destroy the town. Corpescu sent his wives, Hemata, Pulmona and Aorta against the Crossover clan. All enemies converge on the unsuspecting Crossovers.

Finally the four forces engage in battles against each other, thinking the others are the enemies in front of the Crossovers' house. Alerted by Cubby's incessant barking, the surprised Crossover family watch as the four forces finish destroying each other. Cris is bereft over Gash's betrayal. P:pc and S[s] are left for dead by the aliens. Mountebank and Tyranna survive and escape the battle. The Baron Corpescu is waiting for his revenge. Nobody says anything to each other about the identities of the attacking forces; Carter orders them to come back to the house as the police arrive.

=== Cross Your Hearts ===
In the aftermath of the convergence of villains, the Crossovers deal with the recently unleashed Discord deity Eris, summoned by mistake by a lonely wizard who hoped to summon Eros. This results in trust issues between Calista and Carter, as well as appearances of the Goddess Afrodite (who is an old ally of Archetype) and of Archetyke, Carter's youthful clone.

== Collected editions ==
- The Crossovers Vol. 1: Cross Currents, a traveler-sized trade paperback, collecting The Crossovers #1-6, was scheduled to be on sale in September 2003.
- Les Crossovers is a French paperback, traducted by Nicolas Meylaender, published by Semic Comics, which collects The Crossovers #1-6 released in January 2004, in France (ISBN 9782848570495).

== Notable facts ==
- The comic book writer, Robert Rodi, is known to use gay topics in his fictional work. In The Crossovers #4 (May 2003), he writes a gay joke about "Kent" and "Wayne", two domestic partner superheroes. The names refer to Clark Kent and Bruce Wayne.
- CrossGen was in negotiations for a live-action, prime-time television series with Davis Entertainment.
