= Way of the Rat =

- Cover to issue #1. Main character Boon Sai Hong is featured. Art by Jeff Johnson and Tom Ryder.

Publication information
- Publisher: CrossGen Entertainment
- Schedule: Monthly
- Format: Ongoing (cancelled)
- Publication date: June 2002 – June 2004
- No. of issues: 24
- Main character: Boon Sai Hong

Creative team
- Written by: Chuck Dixon

Way of the Rat is an American comic book series published by CrossGen Entertainment in wuxia sub-genre of martial arts adventure. Written by Chuck Dixon, with artwork by Jeff Johnson and Tom Ryder, the series ran for a total of twenty-four issues before its publication was stopped due to CrossGen's bankruptcy.

The series is set in CrossGen's Sigilverse shared universe in the Empire of Shinacea, on the planet Hann Jinn. This planet is also the setting for two other Sigilverse series, The Path and Brath.

== Publication history ==
The twenty-four published issues of Way of the Rat were dated from June 2002 to June 2004.

Silken Ghost, one of the series' supporting characters received her own five-issue limited series in 2003.

== Characters ==
- Boon Sai Hong: A thief from the city of Zhumar, known as the Jade Rat and the series main character, he is named and nicknamed after famous thief Boon Sai Hong, who lived in the 15th century and stole an artifact called "The Jade Rat" that has never been found.
- Po Po: A sapient monkey and Boon's advisor.
- Tei Su: The daughter of one of Zhumar's prominent scholars, she is secretly the masked warrior known as the Silken Ghost.

== Plot synopsis ==
=== Issues #1-6 ===
The series begins with Boon Sai Hong, a local thief in the northern city of Zhumar breaking into the house of the scholar Wing Tei. He finds Tei already dead and steals two objects he later discovers to be the Ring of Staffs (which turns the wearer into an instant master of Bōjutsu) and the Book of the Hell of the Hungry Dragons. He fails to find the third object he intended to steal, the Phoenix Heart, which he later discovers was stolen before his arrival by fellow thieves, Jao and Yan. Discovered in the act, Boon must fight his way past agents of Zhumar's corrupt ruler Judge X'ain.

As he runs he gains an advisor, the sapient monkey Po Po and discovers the ring he now wears gives him the ability to be a master of any art using any type of staff weapon. He also learns that the scroll is the gateway to a hell dimension populated by dragons who devour the souls of all those unlucky enough to fall into their realm.

As all of this goes on, Bhuto Khan, the leader of the nomadic tribes to the west of Zhumar prepares his army to attack the city. Khan bears a ring known as the Ring of Blades, giving him the ability to use any bladed weapon at a master level of skill.

=== Issues #7-12 ===
Having beaten Bhuto Khan in combat and now in possession of the Ring of Blades, Boon is carried through the streets of Zhumar by a celebrating populace. They ask him his name, but mishear him and begin to chant the name Poon Fei Lhong. The celebration reaches the house of Judge X'ain who invites Boon to dinner that night. There Judge X'ain takes possession of the Book of the Hell of the Hungry Dragons.

Using his new toy, Judge X'ain releases the dragons intending to use them for some unknown purpose. He quickly loses control when they begin to devour one another and grow bigger until there is only one singular huge dragon left. It kills Judge X'ain and his agents and breaks free into Zhumar itself.

Boon, with help from the Silken Ghost and the Emperor's daughter, Princess Zheng Mai Lo (with secret aide from Tiger Mah and Old Mother, the leaders of Zhumar's thieves guild—The Brotherhood of Scoundrels) defeats this huge dragon by slicing its belly and releasing all of the smaller dragons inside. He recovers the Book of the Hell of the Hungry Dragons and the Silken Ghost reads the scroll to send the dragons back. Princess Zheng Mai Lo is dragged back with them.

In the aftermath of the battle, Boon gives the Ring of Blades to the Silken Ghost.

=== Issues #13-18 ===
In the wake of the fight with the Dragons, a mass exodus from Zhumar begins to occur. This is quickly stopped when the newly appointed ruler, Minister Hyun orders the city gates closed.

Inside, Boon and his allies seek a way to free Princess Zhend Mai Lo from the Hell of the Hungry Dragons using the Phoenix Heart. This effort fails but results in the return of the ghost of Judge X'ain to the land of the living. Old Mother uses the Phoenix Heart and Judge X'ain is pulled inside, but he almost immediately returns having released all the trapped ghosts inside.

As a result of this event, all the dead in Zhumar begin to rise and the city is quickly filled with ghosts. This attracts the attention of a being known as Kung Kung Yi, a spirit that devours other spirits. Kung Kung Yi begins to feast and eventually gains enough power to allow it the ability to rip the souls from the bodies of living beings.

Tei Su's grandfather, one of the ghosts who have returned, shows her where she can find Ghost Slayer, a sword capable of destroying any spirit, including Kung Kung Yi. As all of the released ghosts flee into the safety of the Phoenix Heart to escape Kung Kung Yi, Boon and the Silken Ghost engage the evil spirit in battle.

=== Issues #19-24 ===
As the Silken Ghost takes care of the evil spirits that remain in Zhumar, the ghost of Judge X'ain discovers how to possess the living and uses this ability to once again take control of Zhumar.

In the headquarters of the Brotherhood of Scoundrels, Boon searches for the missing Jao and Yan. Unknown to Boon, the two had stolen a powerful cursed object from Old Mother's room. This object is a wishing doll, a small porcelain statuette that grants any wish, but twists the words used for the wish in the evilest ways it can. Jao and Yan had wished for riches and the doll had sent them inside a sealed treasure chamber with no way to escape and no food or water. Boon picks up the doll and wishes to know where they are and the doll sends him and Po Po to Jao and Yan's location.

As this is happening a stranger arrives at the front gates of the city. He identifies himself as Poon Fei Lhong and declares that he has come to Zhumar to seek out the man who has stolen his name. He wears a third magic ring—the Ring of Fists. He is confronted by the Silken Ghost who, after a short battle, convinces him that Boon did not mean to steal his name. He decides to leave Zhumar and takes a new name Nung Boa—No Name.

In the treasure vault Boon, Po Po, Jao and Yan encounter the vault's guardian monsters. As they fight for their lives Old Mother discovers the wishing doll sitting in the middle of Jao and Yan's room and quickly figures out what happened to them. After working a great deal of time crafting a wish for which the wording cannot be twisted by the wishing doll she wishes Boon, Po Po, Jao and Yan home.

== Collections ==
The series has been collected in a number of trade paperbacks:

1. Walls of Zhumar (CrossGen, 160 pages, March 2003, ISBN 1-931484-51-1, April 2004, ISBN 1-59314-032-0)
2. The Dragon's Wake (CrossGen, 192 pages, July 2004, ISBN 1-931484-77-5)
3. Haunted Zhumar (CrossGen, 160 pages, September 2004, ISBN 1-59314-042-8, Checker Book Publishing Group, 172 pages, April 2007, ISBN 1-933160-59-4)

== Film adaptation ==
In 2002, DreamWorks Pictures tried to do a film based on the book, but it never materialized. In May 2011, Disney and CrossGen were developing a film based on the comic book series.
