= Sigil (comics) =

Comic book series

- Cover to Sigil #1

Publication information
- Publisher: CrossGen Entertainment
- Schedule: Monthly
- Format: Ended
- Publication date: July 2000 – December 2003
- No. of issues: 42
- Main character(s): Samandahl Rey; Roiya Sintor; JeMerik Meer; Zanniati Oribatta

Creative team
- Created by: Mark Alessi; Gina M. Villa
- Written by: Barbara Kesel; Mark Waid; Chuck Dixon
- Penciller: Ben Lai
- Inker: Ray Lai
- Colorist: Wil Quintana

Sigil is an American comic book series published by CrossGen from July 2000 to December 2003, ending at issue #42. Sigil was one of the publisher's first four titles (alongside Mystic, Scion, and Meridian), originally created by Mark Alessi and Gina M. Villa. The book is one of several from the same publisher that took place in the Sigilverse, or the Cross Generation Universe.

In 2011, Sigil was part of Marvel Comics' relaunch of the Cross Generation Universe.

== Setting ==
Sigil has multiple worlds and civilizations linked by mysterious marks called Sigils. The comic focuses on a futuristic world where humanity has expanded across several planets, forming an alliance known as the Planetary Union. Across the galaxy, humanity faces an ancient enemy, the reptilian Saurians, whose war with the Union defines the political and military power shifts. The characters in Negation are from varied worlds and universes.

The bulk of Sigil takes place on and around the worlds of the Planetary Union, a group of five human-inhabited planets: Gaia (believed to be humanity's home world), Brejhur, Delassia, Kayseecay, and Victor. Humans had also colonized the neutral world of Tanipal, which seceded from the Union sometime before the start of the series. Tanipal is ruled by the Sultan Ronolo.

As the series opens, the Planetary Union has been at war with the Saurians, a starfaring race of reptilian humanoids, for several centuries. The extent of the Saurian empire is unknown, but it is known that the planet of Tcharun serves as its centre of power.

== Plot synopsis ==
Samandahl "Sam" Rey was a former soldier for the Planetary Union. He and his good friend Roiya Sintor were laid off from the army due to cutbacks and became mercenaries. The pair were "vacationing" in the pleasure world of Tanipal when the series begins. While on Tanipal, Sam and Roiya meet the beautiful Zanniati Oribatta and her bodyguard, an orange-eyed man named JeMerik Meer, joining their team permanently.

During that initial meeting, a Saurian assassin squad arrived looking for Sam who had previously made an enemy of Tchlusarud, the youngest Saurian prince, who now desperately wants him dead. In the ensuing fight, Sam was tackled by an odd Saurian with glowing orange eyes. That Saurian said to Sam, "You shall find them, gather them, and lead them" before branding him with a swirling red and yellow mark: the sigil. After which the Saurian then disappeared. While Sam was distracted, one of the attacking Saurians impaled Roiya with his weapon, fatally injuring her.

The four retreated to Sam's ship, The Bitterluck, where they failed to save Roiya's life. In a fit of rage, Sam activated his sigil, destroying a large part of the city in the process.

== Relaunch ==
Sigil was relaunched by Marvel Comics in March 2011 with an entirely different storyline, now focused on Samantha Rey, a 16-year-old girl from South Carolina who wakes up one day to find herself branded with a strange symbol, and eventually becomes embroiled in a temporal war.

The run is four issues long. It was written by Mike Carey and primarily pencilled by Leonard Kirk. The first issue sets up Sam's character as someone strong and witty with a strong moral compass. It also establishes the comic's cast and plot. IGN rated it 7.5/10. The second issue begins with Sam aboard a pirate ship that's under attack. IGN praised its pacing, dialogue, and intrigue, rating it an 8/10. The third issue begins addressing some of the mysteries the series has set up. IGN continued praising the story but found some faults with the art, rating the issue 8/10. The fourth and final issue brings the plot to a close while leaving the door open for future stories. IGN commended how well Samantha and the female pirate, Captain Sin, were written, as well as the issue's dialogue, action, and artwork. They gave it a rating of 8.5/10.

== Creative teams ==
Sigil was created by Mark Alessi and Gina M. Villa. The original creative team consisted of writer Barbara Kesel, the brothers Ben Lai on pencils and Ray Lai on inks, and Wil Quintana coloring. Over the years, this line-up changed several times.

Other notable writers on the series included Mark Waid, Chuck Dixon, and Mike Carey (under the relaunched Marvel Comics CrossGen imprint). Other pencillers included Steve McNiven, Scot Eaton, Dale Eaglesham, and Leonard Kirk.

== Books ==
CrossGen published four trade paperback books containing the first part of the series:

- Sigil Volume 1: Mark of Power, ISBN 1-931484-01-5, ISBN 978-1-931484-01-5
- Sigil Volume 2: The Marked Man, ISBN 1-931484-07-4, ISBN 978-1-931484-07-7
- Sigil Volume 3: The Lizard God, ISBN 1-931484-28-7, ISBN 978-1-931484-28-2
- Sigil Volume 4: Hostage Planet, ISBN 1-931484-53-8, ISBN 978-1-931484-53-4

CrossGen also announced a further two books, but went bankrupt before they were published. Checker Books released them in July 2007:

- Sigil Volume 5: Death Match, ISBN 1-933160-58-6, ISBN 978-1-933160-58-0
- Sigil Volume 6: Planetary Union, ISBN 1-933160-67-5, ISBN 978-1-933160-67-2

== See also ==
- Mark Alessi
- CrossGen
- Negation War
