= Negation (comics) =

Comic book series

Publication information
- Publisher: CrossGen
- Format: Ongoing series
- Publication date: January 2002 – March 2004
- No. of issues: 27 (and a prequel)
- Main character(s): Obregon Kain; Mercer Drake; Evinlea; Shassa; Charon

Creative team
- Created by: Mark Waid; Tony Bedard; Paul Pelletier

Negation is a comic book series published by CrossGen. Tony Bedard was the writer for the entire run. Paul Pelletier was the artist for most of the issues, with an occasional fill-in artist on some issues.

== Publication history ==
Negation started with the Negation Prequel in December 2001, followed by 27 regular issues in the series. The story concerned a group of different alien races that had been taken prisoner and brought to the Negation universe. A number of the prisoners had innate superhuman powers while many, like Obregon Kaine, were ordinary humans. His tactical military experience made him able to lead the prisoners. He masterminded the plan that allowed a number of his fellow prisoners to escape the prison planet all of them were being held in. The series details the adventures which Kaine and the rest had in Negation space. The series ended with issue #27. CrossGen tried to wrap up all the dangling storylines in the Negation War miniseries. CrossGen had to declare bankruptcy before the series could be finished. Only two issues of Negation War were published.

In October 2004, writer Tony Bedard was quoted laying out a design for the future of the characters in an interview.

CrossGen released two trade paperback books which contained the first part of the series:

- Negation Volume 1: BOHICA
- Negation Volume 2: Baptism of Fire

Two more books were released on May 25, 2007:

- Negation Volume 3: Hounded
- Negation Volume 4: Shock and Awe

CrossGen Chronicles #7, Negation: Lawbringer, and the Mark of Charon miniseries were Negation-related books that CrossGen published. All stories were written by Tony Bedard and expand the universe created in the main Negation series.

== Characters ==
=== Prisoners/Fugitives ===
- Obregon Kaine AKA "The Pest". Occupation: Captain of the Paladins; 24th armored air cavalry. Kaine is a de facto leader of the group of fugitives due to his military and tactical expertise.
- Evinlea is one of the race of gods known as The First from House Sinister. She eventually struck a deal with Charon, the god-emperor of the Negation Universe, to get back home and conquer it.
- Lizard Lady is a female reptilian/humanoid scout (from the Sigil worlds) who stayed with Kaine until the end of the series. At the end of the Negation series she, Kaine and Zaida are alone on a spaceship; the others having left them on a different ship hoping to hide in some planet in Negation Space. She provides the key to unlock the power of Zaida and her baby. Her real name is Khlystek (from Know Your Negation, a character guide found in Negation TPB, vol II: Baptism of Fire).
- Iress is halfbreed goddess, born from a member of The First of House Dexter and a mortal. She hates Evinlea with good reason and she does not have nearly the power of Evinlea.
- Matua - Home Planet: Ciress. Of the Djinn Guild (from the Mystic world) Matua is a skilled sorcerer and a master of a number of "djinn" spirits. He died valiantly fighting Lawbringer LKQR, sacrificing himself with a deadly spell in order to kill the creature.
- Corrin - Origin: City/State of Atlantis, Earth. She believes that she sleeps in a stasis tube under the sea, and that being in the Negation universe is only a vivid dream. She is woken up to the reality of her life in Negation Space by Gammid (a fellow Atlantean).
- Gammid is a member of the Atlantean Race from Earth. Gammid and his brother Galvan first appeared in the comic book series Crux. Gammid came to Negation Space to guide a tribe of humans to a higher plane of existence. He was imprisoned by Charon for some time before being freed by the group as they rescued Zaida's baby Memi. Gammid was able to return all the powers of all the Sigil bearers (plus Evinlea) and he woke Corrin up to the reality of her situation. Gammid helped to kill Javi (after he returned from the dead) but was in turn sliced in half by one of Charon's elite inverse Sigil bearers.
- Fluxor is a native to Negation Space and a member of the near-extinct kremmin race. During the Negation occupation, seven worlds within the Kremmin Continuum were wiped out by Lawbringers. Fluxor is a captain of the kremmin ship, the Outreach. Not very competent as a Captain, his character is much a spoof of Captain Kirk/William Shatner from Star Trek.
- Exor is native to Negation Space. First Officer to Captain Fluxor, he compensates for his captain's deficiencies as a leader and an officer. He is killed on planet Senkiem along with the rest of the crew of the Outreach.
- Calyx - Home: Torbel. Occupation: Seamstress. Pet: a vermin-like creature she calls "Foonie".
- Thustra is a silent elf-like beauty, and she does little in the series.
- Thalia is a mortal woman, and is given powers by Lord Kohm of The First, from House Dexter. She dies early.
- Monchito is a strange little creature that was part of the group that was abducted into Negation Space. He is called "Monchito" because that is all he seems to say. He grows to enormous size in one episode of the comic.
- Zaida is an orange-eyed modest young woman abducted from Lita City. She gave birth to a baby girl named Memi after being abducted into the Negation Universe and holds a secret.
- Memi is an inexplicably indestructible infant and a daughter of Zaida and a man named Cobi.
- Zamida: A combination of mother-daughter pair Zaida and Memi, Zamida is a part of a powerful entity living in the Crossgen Universe named Danik. This is the same entity who helped facilitate (through suggestion) the creation of the Sigil-bearers in order to fight the impending Negation invasion. She appears as a little girl in this state, resembling Zaida.

==== Sigil Bearers ====
It was revealed in the series that there were five Sigil-Bearers taken by the Negation, though apparently only four survived the "Extinction Wave", a weapon which rendered the prison planet into a burnt husk. The survivors are as follows:

- Javi Cobian is a Sigil Bearer with the ability to empower others and repair any damage done to their bodies. Home Planet: Larrinaga in the Hatorei System. Occupation: Doctor. Cobian is a man of faith, a member of the church of Dedition. Thought to have been killed by Lawbringer QZTR, Javi later resurfaced and lead the first of Charon's inverse Sigil (LIGIS) bearers. He is killed by Gammid and Kaine working together.
- Mercer Drake is a Sigil-bearer with the power to overcome any physical obstacle to attain a location or object. This power is immensely powerful though bizarre to contemplate. Occupation: self-proclaimed pirate. Mercer Drake is described as a "scourge of the skies... Most wanted man in the Kazrath System".
- Westin is a Sigil-bearer with the ability to see how technology is operated. Later it is revealed that he can see backwards in time. Occupation: Thief/Con Artist. He is not the most trusted member of the group.
- Shassa is a Sigil-bearer whose powers enable her to combat any enemy by feeding off portions of their strengths, though it only affects her and does not seem to weaken her opponents in any way. Her powers allowed her to hold her own in battle against both Evinlea and Lawbriner Qztr. Occupation: Constable

The fifth Sigil-bearer, a blue-skinned, blue-haired individual with the Sigil marked on the right side of his neck, was shown in the Negation Prequel, though his name and his abilities were never mentioned. He was apparently slain at the prison planet, possibly either by one of the warden's tests or during the deployment of the Extinction Wave weapon, which effectively annihilated the prison planet.

There was also a character in the prequel that bore a sigil on his shoulder.

=== Negation Military ===
- Charon is a God Emperor of the Negation. Called the "Mad God", he occupied the "negation" universe in 10,000 years with the Core Negation. He is currently assembling armies to conquer the "bright" universe, the motive being to restore order, as he claims he did for his current universe.
- Qztr is said to be the first Lawbringer (the enforcer gods of Negation space) and Charon's most favored child.
- Kryzorr is a military Regent General SectorCom G1 of the Negation Imperium. He is a member of Core Negation, the initial group who followed Charon during his occupation of the "negation" universe, and themselves acquired differing degrees of power; Kryzzor's power is recognized by the aquamarine energy taking up the top half of his head.
- Komptin is a High Castellan in the Negation Imperium, a position separate from the Core Negation. Home Planet: Kalima, native to Negation space. He becomes obsessed with capturing and destroying Obregon Kaine, much like Ahab obsesses over the white whale.
- Murquade is Negation General of the Battle Group Clarion and of Core Negation. He fought off and hunted "Transitioned" humans who came, from Earth's continent of Australia, to Negation space via a portal machine, giving them a bit of power (not unlike Murquade's own), marked by the jagged, light green energy emitting from various parts of their bodies. He is eventually destroyed by the Australians.
