= Mystic (comics) =

Comic book series (2000 – 2004)

- Mystic #43 (Jan. 2004), cover art by Aaron Lopresti and Matt Ryan

Publication information
- Publisher: CrossGen
- Schedule: Monthly
- Format: Ongoing series
- Genre: Science fantasy
- Publication date: July 2000 – January 2004
- No. of issues: 43
- Main character(s): Genevieve Villard; Giselle Villard

Creative team
- Created by: Ron Marz; Brandon Peterson
- Written by: Ron Marz; Tony Bedard
- Penciller(s): Brandon Peterson; Fabrizio Fiorentino; Aaron Lopresti; Steve McNiven; Paul Pelletier; Al Rio; Paul Ryan; Kevin Sharpe
- Inker(s): Jason Baumgartner; Mark Farmer; Marco Galli; Drew Geraci; Drew Hennessy; Rob Hunter; Mark Lipka; Victor Llamas; Pablo Marcos; Roland Paris; Matt Ryan; Rob Stull; Joe Weems

Mystic is a comic book from the Florida-based CrossGen Comics. It was created by writer Ron Marz and artist Brandon Peterson and was one of five flagship titles in the company's Sigilverse shared universe. Mystic ran for 43 issues (July 2000 – January 2004).

== Plot summary ==
=== Overview ===
Magic on the planet Ciress is an apprenticed profession organized by guilds specializing in one field of practice. The story centers on sisters Genevieve and Giselle Villard, nicknamed "Gis". The former had devoted her life to sorcery within the Nouveau Guild; the latter is a spoiled socialite who, against her wishes, is granted great power and responsibility as a Sigil-Bearer. Gis, formerly indifferent to sorcery, can now master not one, but all of the extant schools of magic.

=== Story ===
The first six issues of Mystic describe Giselle's gaining of the Sigil and the efforts of the guild leaders to regain her power. Giselle gains her Sigil in the first issue and without intending to, steals the spirits of the ancient (and long dead) guild leaders. She also gets a guide in the form of a talking cat-like creature with yellow eyes and a love interest named Thierry Chevailier (an artist but without any magical ability). Starting in issue #4, Giselle gains the attention of one of The First who goes by the name Darrow. At first Darrow seems to help Giselle but he is under orders from Ingra to sway Giselle to the side of House Sinister.

The efforts of the other guild leaders to strip Giselle of the spirits of the long dead guild leaders fail (issue #6) but the leaders of all but two of the magic guilds regard the situation as unacceptable. To destroy Giselle the guild leaders (with the exception of Astral and Nouveau) break the prison which confined Animora. This sets in motion a conflict which lasts for the next 12 issues between Giselle (and her sister Genevieve, the leader of the Nouveau guild) against Animora and the other guild leaders. Darrow rapidly switches sides and supports Animora also. With the reluctant aid of the spirits of the former guild leaders, Giselle is able to defeat all her enemies (issue #14 and again in issue #20) but at a cost.

After her second defeat, Animora was able to establish a psychic link to Giselle and over time this turned into a form of possession. As this control was growing, Giselle alienated her good friend Thierry Chevailier and he fell in love with the older sister Genevieve (issue #24). Eventually Giselle meets Ingra and after a battle - in which Ingra easily defeats Giselle - Ingra breaks Animora's hold over Giselle and imprisons Animora (issue #23). Part of the reason why Ingra is able to defeat Giselle is that due to Giselle's recent behavior, the spirits of the guild leaders refuse to help her. Giselle, without their aid, finds that her knowledge of magic is very poor. She resolves to become a master of magic and starts with learning the magic of the Nouveau guild from her sister Genevieve, before moving on to the Shaman guild, the Djinn guild and the Astral guild (issues #25–28).

In CrossGen Chronicles #5 it is revealed that an eighth guild named Taroc had existed but vanished centuries ago. The Taroc guild leader sacrificed herself to imprison Animora, one of The First, who had been banished by Ingra, the leader of House Sinister.

It is later revealed that a secret guild exists (issue #33) called the Geometer guild, the members of which are allied with the Dark Magi guild and the Tantric guild. The Geometers believe themselves to be manipulators of all the other guilds; the guildmaster is named Archemus.

== Characters ==
- Giselle ("Gis") Villard is one of the many Sigil-Bearers. She was the younger sister who spent her time going to parties and socializing while her older sister Genieveve studied hard and moved up rapidly in the ranks of the Nouveau Mages Guild. The series begins on the day of Genevieve's ascension to the rank of Guild master for the Nouveau guild where she is to receive the spirit of the Nouveau guild. On that day, Giselle is given the Sigil on her hand and consequently absorbs the spirit of the Nouveau guild as well as the six other spirits of the guilds.
- Genevieve Villard is the older sister, and the Sigil-Bearer of Ciress. Genevieve studied hard and moved up rapidly in the ranks of the Nouveau Mages' Guild. When the old guild leader died, Genevieve was chosen to be the new guild master. The Mystic series begins on the day of Genevieve's ascension to the rank of Guild master. On that day, Genevieve's younger sister Giselle is given a sigil on her hand and she then absorbs all the spirits of the long-dead guild masters of the seven magic guilds, including the spirit Genevieve was supposed to obtain.
- Animora is the main antagonist of Mystic, and she is a banished member of The First. Her goal is to kill Ingra any way possible. Animora was one of House Sinister, but she tried to take over the House Sinister Seat from Ingra, and Ingra banished her and reduced her powers. When Animora came to Ciress, she tried to conquer it, but the eight main Guild masters retaliated and trapped her in an abyss.

== Collections ==
=== Published ===
- Mystic 1: Rite of Passage
- Mystic 2: The Demon Queen
- Mystic 3: Siege of Scales
- Mystic 4: Out All Night

=== Unpublished ===
- Mystic 5: Master Class
- Mystic 6: The Mathemagician

==== Note ====
The bankruptcy of CrossGen prevented the publication of these previously-announced collections.

== Marvel limited series ==
Mystic

Publication information
- Publisher: Marvel Comics
- Schedule: Monthly
- Format: Limited series
- Genre: Science fantasy
- Publication date: October 2011 – January 2012
- No. of issues: 4
- Main character(s): Genevieve Villard; Giselle Villard

Creative team
- Created by: G. Willow Wilson and David Lopez
- Written by: G. Willow Wilson
- Artist: David López

In 2011, Marvel Comics relaunched Mystic as a four-issue limited series, written by G. Willow Wilson with art by David López. In this continuity reboot, Giselle and Genevieve are now poor orphan sisters in the steampunk world of Hyperion. They secretly teach themselves the Noble Arts, a magical technology which only the nobility are allowed to study. Wilson described the series as "high-fantasy Mean Girls meets Les Misérables". It was collected as The Tenth Apprentice in the same year.

== Sources ==
- The 11th Hour #16 (Oct. 2000): Mystic (review of CrossGen series)
- The CrossGen Creator Watch (Feb. 28, 2005)
- Mystic (CrossGen) at the Grand Comics Database
- Mystic (CrossGen) at the Comic Book DB (archived from the original)
- Mystic (Marvel limited series) at the Grand Comics Database
- Mystic (CrossGen) at the Comic Book DB (archived from the original)
