= Sojourn (comics) =

CrossGen comic book series

- Cover to Sojourn #1

Publication information
- Publisher: CrossGen Comics Inc.
- Schedule: Monthly
- Format: Ongoing series
- Publication date: August 2001 – May 2004
- No. of issues: 35
- Main character(s): Arwyn; Gareth; Kreeg; Cassidy; Mordath; Bohr; Gustavus; Neven; Ayden; Shiara

Creative team
- Created by: Mark Alessi; Gina M. Villa
- Written by: Ron Marz; Ian Edginton
- Penciller: Greg Land

Sojourn is a fantasy comic book series published by American company CrossGen. The series follows the adventures of the archer Arwyn and her companions as they battle undead dictator Mordath. Unlike other CrossGen comics, Sojourn does not center on a Sigil-Bearer, but instead depicts a villainous Sigil-Bearer whom the heroes are tasked with defeating. It ran for 35 issues from 2001 to 2004 until it was forced to end by the bankruptcy of CrossGen. For a time, this series was CrossGen's highest grossing comic.

== Premise ==
Sojourn takes place in the world of Quin, which comprises five lands inhabited by different races. The lands were ruled by the human dictator Mordath, who conquered Quin with an army of trolls, until he was killed in battle with the mysterious Ayden. After Mordath's death, Ayden fragmented the arrow used to kill him into five shards for each land, pledging to return in a time of peril if the shards are united.

Peril returns to Quin 300 years later when Mordath is resurrected, allowing him to again conquer the five lands with his troll army. When archer Arwyn loses her husband and daughter to Mordath's army, she goes on a quest to unite the five arrow shards in order to defeat the undead dictator. Among other allies, she is accompanied by one-eyed archer Gareth and the thief Cassidy in her travels through the five lands.

Due to the series' cancellation, the comic ends on an unresolved cliffhanger.

== Races of the Five Lands ==
- Humans have a distinctly European look in Middelyn, and a Middle-Eastern look in Oudubai. Distinct Medieval and Arab cultures depend on area and are most concentrated in Middelyn and Oudubai.
- Trolls have greenish skin, glowing green eyes and some form of horns sprouting from their foreheads. Long lived, with barbarian-like culture and are most concentrated in Grinbor.
- Ankharans have distinct African look but with bird-like wings, with Egyptian-like culture.
- Iskani or Snow Trolls are relatives of the Trolls, long lived, with nordic-like culture and are most concentrated in Skarnhime. They have some form of tusks sprouting from their chins.
- Urnethi are underground dwellers, insect-like and are most concentrated in Oudubai.
- Dragons are mostly concentrated in Middelyn and islands in the oceans of Quin.
- Carvers of the Glade are small green creatures, and are most concentrated in the Glade of Heroes.

== Collections ==
Sojourn had four trade paperbacks (TPBs) released by CrossGen before their bankruptcy, with two more released later by Checker Books:

- TPB #1 "From The Ashes" – issues #0–6
- TPB #2 "The Dragon's Tale" – issues #7–12
- TPB #3 "The Warrior's Tale" – issues #13–18
- TPB #4 "The Thief's Tale" – issues #19–24
- TPB #5 "The Sorcerer's Tale" – issues #25–30 (ISBN 1-933160-44-6) released by Checker Books in February 2007
- TPB #6 "The Berserker's Tale" – issues #31–34 released by Checker Books in October 2007.

There was also one collected edition not included above because it was merely a reprint of the prequel and issue #1 put into one comic.

== Creators ==
- Ron Marz - writer for the prequel issue and issues #1 through #24.
- Greg Land - the penciler for the prequel issue and most of the issues between #1 and #33.
- Ian Edginton - writer for issues #25 through #34.
- Sergio Cariello - the penciler who took over for Greg Land starting in issue #34, the issue that became the final one.
- Chuck Dixon - co-writer for issue #34, he was responsible for writing the cliffhanger ending.
- Stuart Immonen - guest penciler for issue #7.
- June Brigman - guest penciler for issue #12.
- Aaron Lopresti - guest penciler for issue #17.
- Luke Ross - guest penciler for issue #21. He would team up with Ron Marz again for the Dark Horse comic Samurai: Heaven and Earth.
- Lewis LaRosa - guest penciler for pages 1–9, and 21–22 of issue #26.
- Tom Derenick - guest penciler for pages 10–20 of issue #26.
- Cliff Richards - guest penciler for issue #30.
- Greg Land did covers for all issues penciled by himself. The other covers were done by their respective pencilers except for issues #30 and #34 which were done by Land.
