= CrossGen =

American comic book publisher

Cross Generation Comics
- The CrossGen Comics logo utilized before being re-designed by Marvel Entertainment.
- Industry: Publishing
- Genre: Science fiction; Science fantasy
- Founded: 1998; 28 years ago (as Cross Generation Comics); 2010; 16 years ago (as CrossGen)
- Founder: Mark Alessi
- Defunct: 2012; 14 years ago
- Fate: Assets acquired by The Walt Disney Company, re-branded as a label for Marvel Comics
- Headquarters: 135 W. 50th Street, New York City, New York, U.S.
- Key people: Mark Alessi; Gina M. Villa; Barbara Kesel; Mark Waid; Ron Marz
- Products: Comics
- Owner: Marvel Comics

Cross Generation Comics or CrossGen Comics was an American comic book publisher and entertainment company that operated from 1998 to 2004. The company's assets were acquired by The Walt Disney Company in 2004, and designated to Disney Publishing Worldwide. In July 2010, Disney re-established the brand through Marvel Comics, who announced plans to revive CrossGen titles, though it was short-lived.

== History ==
CrossGen Comics, Inc., was founded in 1998 in Tampa, Florida, by entrepreneur Mark Alessi.

In 1999, the company acquired the Orlando-based multi-genre fan convention MegaCon from founder James Breitbiel, who became CrossGen's marketing and distribution director.

In January 2000, CrossGen Comics, Inc. debuted with CrossGenesis, a sneak-peek at the CrossGen universe. It provided an outline of the universe, worlds, and characters of CrossGen's flagship titles that would be released six months later. Gina M. Villa, head of creative departments, and Mark Alessi wrote a history of the Sigilverse before any comics were written. The head creative team consisted of Barbara Kesel, Mark Waid and Ron Marz. Unlike other comics publishers such as DC Comics and Marvel Comics, which rely mainly on freelance writers and artists, most of CrossGen's talent were salaried employees of the company and worked out of its headquarters in Oldsmar, Florida. Later creators such as J. M. DeMatteis worked freelance, with CrossGen publishing finished properties. The company's publications covered a variety of genres with characters inhabiting a single shared universe.

Waid has described Alessi as "the biggest bully I've ever met in my life" and has said that:

[Alessi's] idea of creative guidance was to; quite literally, scream until he was red in the face that there wasn't enough detail on the page and that he wanted to see every single blade of grass, Goddamnit! He'd punish guys who drew perfectly well without his help by focusing on some detail or another on one of 22 pages--some face that somehow wasn't exactly what he saw in his head, whatever the hell that was--by berating them at the top of his lungs and then sending them home for the day, "and don't come back until you can draw it right!"

The cover to CrossGenesis #1

=== First wave ===
The first wave of CrossGen titles included: Sigil, a military science fiction space opera; Mystic, a magical fantasy; Meridian, flavored by traditional folklore; Scion, an adventure series inspired by tales of King Arthur; and CrossGen Chronicles, a series detailing the "untold" history of the CrossGen universe.

The protagonists of the first wave of CrossGen comics were linked in commonality by the Sigil each character had received. It was a branding on their body, a marking that granted them unusual powers. The Sigil, and the story of the Sigil-Bearers, was a prominent aspect of the narrative.

=== Following titles ===
In November 2000, the Homeric myth The First was released and, steadily over the next three years, CrossGen released many more titles.

The following were released in 2001: Crux (based on the Atlantean myth); Sojourn (an epic fantasy in the style of The Lord of the Rings); Ruse (a Victorian detective story); and Negation.

In the following year, these titles were released: the horror story Route 666; the wuxia comedy Way of the Rat; and the samurai drama The Path.

The company enjoyed great initial success, with fifteen Harvey Award nominations in 2002.

In 2003, other titles were released expanding the fictional universe: the sword and sorcery epic Brath; Chimera, a limited series about a Sigil-bearer on the far reaches of the Universe; the pirate adventure El Cazador; and two other titles that explain the origin of the Sigil-bearers, Solus and Mark of Charon.

Titles such as Negation and Crux blended genres. Although most CrossGen titles shared common elements (such as a Sigil, the presence of a Mentor and a member of the god-like First), the titles rarely crossed over with each other. The major example of crossing over was Sam of Sigil, who spent four issues in the world of Brath and part of one issue in the world of Meridan, with the latter period also being told from Sephie's perspective in issue #20 of Meridan. There was one company-crossover event, the Negation War, but was never concluded.

=== CrossGen Entertainment, Inc. (CGE) ===
CrossGen Entertainment logo

In 2003, CrossGen Comics, Inc. changed its name to CrossGen Entertainment, Inc. (CGE), and formed eleven wholly owned subsidiary companies, which represented its broad-based entertainment products and offerings. These companies were to act independently of CGE, functioning as interior business units while all working towards CGE's overall goals. With this arrangement, all current and future projects would be managed and guided by Crossgen's founding principles. These projects consisted of:

- CrossGen Intellectual Property, LLC: CGIP held all CGE content intellectual property (IP).
- CrossGen Technologies, LLC: CGT held all CGE technology IP and managed technology IP creation, development, production, and application.
- CrossGen Publishing, LLC: CGPub published all print projects, including CGE Ancillary, Code 6, CrossGen Universe, and foreign publishing.
- Code 6 Comics, LLC: A subsidiary of CGPub, C6C published Code 6 publications.
  - CrossGen Comics, LLC: A subsidiary of CGPub, CGC published CGU print publications.
- CrossGen Media, LLC: CGM was responsible for feature films, television programs, video games, websites, merchandise, and additional interactive products.
- CrossGen Productions, LLC: A subsidiary of CGM, CGP was to produce feature films and television programs.
- CrossGen Interactive, LLC: A subsidiary of CGM, CGI was responsible for interactive publishing, video games, and role-playing games.
- MegaCon, LLC: MGC managed the MegaCon convention.
- CrossGen Education, LLC: CGEd published educational materials.
- Comics On The Web, LLC: COW was responsible for Internet publishing, including Comics On The Web.

Crossgen Entertainment logo

CrossGen Comics Entertainment, Inc.(CGE) was set up to take over the publishing of all existing comics properties. Its logo would appear on anything that came from CrossGen. CGE acted as a publisher for affiliated companies that would retain full ownership and control of their property and would reap the benefits of joining with a larger company.

==== Code6 ====
Code6 Logo

Code6 was another imprint of CrossGen Entertainment created to publish titles set outside of the Sigilverse, such as The Red Star, DemonWars, and The Crossovers. All titles published with the Code6 logo would be owned by both the creator and CrossGen Entertainment, Inc. with the majority of ownership resting with CGE. CrossGen would pay an upfront page rate and then split all rights and revenues 75%-25%.

Code6 is the Florida Police signal code for an escaped prisoner. It was used to describe the attitude of the creators working at Code6.

==== Comics on the Web (COW) ====
One of Crossgen's innovations was the sale of comic subscriptions via the Internet. Subscribers could view all of Crossgen's titles through a web browser. The web comics reproduced the fine color of the original, but the lettering was sometimes not quite legible; hovering over the word or thought bubble caused it to enlarge to a readable size, a feature developed in Flash by Gabo Mendoza of Gabocorp Studios. The online library was estimated to contain 160 issues and 4,400 pages by the end of 2002. CrossGen was among the first comics companies to publish online.

=== Bankruptcy ===
In 2003, CrossGen found itself in a scandal over freelancer payments, exposing systemic financial problems. As the news reached comics fans, sales were affected and creative staff, such as Gina Villa, Brandon Peterson, and Ron Marz, began to abandon the company.

Some industry observers noted that the company's difficulties became apparent shortly after the Borders and Barnes & Noble bookstore chains discontinued stocking CrossGen's trade paperback collections, and returned huge numbers of unsold books for credit/refund, more than wiping out the publisher's optimistically low reserves against returns. In an interview with Marc Alessi on the Dollar Bin podcast, the root cause of CrossGen's financial collapse was said to be the result of a large decrease in the value of Perot Systems stock that was largely backing the company's financing. The financial plan was to lose money in the first six years before earning profits in the seventh year through film and television deals.

In late 2003 the company restructured, selling MegaCon to show organizer Elizabeth Widera.

CrossGen filed for bankruptcy in June 2004 and ceased publishing, leaving titles such as Sojourn, Negation War, Brath, and many others cancelled mid-story.

In July 2004, Disney Publishing was interested in licensing CrossGen content but, upon discovering the company's bankruptcy, began seeking to acquire its assets instead. Founder Alessi loaned the company $75,000, but was unable to prevent the company's takeover. On November 15, Disney purchased CrossGen's assets for $1 million with plans to publish four prose hardcover novels based on writer J. M. DeMatteis and artist Mike Ploog's Abadazad.

CGCreators.net was created to attempt to track the subsequent doings of various staff associated with the company. It has since ceased operations.

As of 2008, various CrossGen domain names and URLs were held by cybersquatters.

=== Checker Books ===
In 2006, Checker Books obtained the rights to publish trade collections of various CrossGen series, starting with Sojourn. A total of nine collected editions were part of the agreement: two each for Sojourn, Negation, and Scion, and single volumes for The Way of the Rat, Sigil, and The Path. There are no plans by Checker Books for more traveler-sized collections.

Mark Thompson, the publisher of Checker Books, traveled to New York in 2007 and spoke with Disney representatives about reprinting further collections. No agreement has been made at the time, but according to Mark Thompson, he indicated that this would happen. In a quick follow-up interview he expanded on things, explaining how difficult it has been to pin down what is considered 'full distributed' and to solve this they are: "planning to propose to Disney that we 'catch up' by putting out omnibus collections".

In 2008, Checker Books published three CrossGen titles. These were:

- Negation Hounded, Vol. 3 (writer Tony Bedard, illustrator Paul Pelletier, ISBN 978-1-933160-63-4, 172 pages)
- Sigil V. 6 Planetary Union (writer Chuck Dixon, illustrator Scot Eaton, ISBN 978-1-933160-67-2, 172 pages)
- Sojourn Volume 6 - The Berzerker's Tale (writer Ian Edginton, illustrator Greg Land, ISBN 978-1-933160-72-6, 172 pages)

=== Revival ===
In July 2010, Marvel Comics (also a Disney-owned company) announced a plans to revive a number of CrossGen titles.

Marvel began to publish Ruse and Sigil in March 2011 as four-issue miniseries. Both completed their run, and a third Crossgen title, Mystic, premiered in August 2011. Two more books, Route 666 and Kiss Kiss Bang Bang, were announced during Fan Expo Canada in late August, and were set to start in February 2012, but were never published due to low interest in the previously released series.

In 2022, Marvel Comics released CrossGen Tales #1, a trade paperback collection that contains the reprinted original first issues of Mystic, Sigil, Ruse, and Soujourn. An omnibus collection of the original Sigil series was released in 2023.

In September 2024, every issue of Mystic appeared within the Marvel Unlimited app. Each issue displays the Marvel logo in the place where the CrossGen logo used to be. The series was also released in omnibus trade format that month.

== Titles ==
=== Sigilverse ===
The majority of CrossGen's titles took place within a shared universe, informally dubbed the Sigilverse by CrossGen fans. CrossGen published the following titles in the Sigilverse. Most titles are listed in order of appearance. Miniseries and one-shots associated with an ongoing title are listed thereunder.

Title	Prequel	Issue #1	Final issue #	Final issue
CrossGenesis	-	Jan 2000	1	Jan 2000
CrossGen Chronicles	-	June 2000	8	July 2002
Mystic	-	July 2000	43	Jan 2004
Sigil	-	July 2000	42	Dec 2003
Saurians: Unnatural Selection		Feb 2002	2	March 2002
Scion	-	July 2000	43	April 2004
Meridian	-	July 2000	44	April 2004
The First	-	Nov 2000	37	Dec 2003
Crux	-	May 2001	33	Feb 2004
Sojourn	July 2001	Aug 2001	34	May 2004
Ruse	-	Nov 2001	26	Jan 2004
Archard's Agents: A Most Convenient Murder	-	Jan 2003	1	Jan 2003
Archard's Agents: The Case of the Puzzled Pugilist	-	Nov 2003	1	Nov 2003
Archard's Agents: Deadly Dare	-	April 2004	1	April 2004
Negation	Dec 2001	Jan 2002	27	March 2004
Negation: Lawbringer	-	Nov 2002	1	Nov 2002
Mark of Charon	-	April 2003	5	Aug 2003
Negation War	-	April 2004	2	June 2004
The Path	March 2002	April 2002	23	April 2004
Way of the Rat	-	June 2002	24	June 2004
The Silken Ghost	-	June 2003	5	Oct 2003
Route 666	-	July 2002	22	June 2004
Brath	Feb 2003	March 2003	14	June 2004
Chimera	-	March 2003	4	July 2003
Solus	-	April 2003	8	Dec 2003
El Cazador	-	Oct 2003	6	June 2004
El Cazador: The Bloody Ballad of Blackjack Tom	-	April 2004	1	April 2004
Kiss Kiss Bang Bang	-	Feb 2004	5	June 2004

CrossGen collected several of the above titles in trade paperback format.

=== Compendia ===
CrossGen published two monthly anthologies, referred to as compendia, that reprinted several titles from the main shared continuity. Each issue contained between 6 and 11 issues.

- Forge (13 issues, reprints of Crux, Meridian, Negation, Sojourn, The Path, Route 666)
- Edge/Vector (13 issues, reprints of The First, Mystic, Ruse, Scion, Sigil, Way of the Rat, and Solus)

After 12 issues, Edge was renamed Vector due to a trademark conflict with another company. A third compendium called Caravan was never released.

Roughly halfway through the run of the compendia, their format changed from standard comic size to a half-page sized digest format, usually with a higher page count. CrossGen later used this compendium format to collect runs of single titles, such as Meridian and The Path, to reported success.

=== Promotional and related titles ===
- CrossGen Sampler (a free promotional comic which included several pages from each of CrossGen's first five titles)
- CrossGen Primer (a promotional comic bundled with an issue of Wizard magazine)
- Wizard CrossGen Special (a later promotional comic bundled with Wizard magazine)
- CrossGen Illustrated (softcover book with art and information on several Sigilverse titles)
- Pre-release Reader review copies of the first issue of several series, some in black and white.

=== Additional titles ===
In addition to its Sigilverse comics, CrossGen published a number of additional titles:

Title	Issue #1	Final issue #	Issue count
Abadazad	March 2004	May 2004	3
R.A. Salvatore's Demon Wars: Trial by Fire	January 2003	May 2003	5
R.A. Salvatore's Demon Wars: Eye for an Eye	June 2003	Nov 2003	5
The Crossovers	Feb 2003	Dec 2003	9
Lady Death: A Medieval Tale	March 2003	April 2004	12
Lady Death: Wild Hunt	April 2004	May 2004	2
The Red Star	Feb 2003	July 2004	5
Space Ace	Sep 2003	Nov 2003	3
Dragon's Lair	August 2003	Nov 2003	3
Masters of the Universe	-	-	-
Masters of the Universe: Icons of Evil	Aug 2003	Oct 2003	3
Masters of the Universe: Rise of the Snakemen	Oct 2003	Jan 2004	3
Masters of the Universe: Encyclopedia	Jan 2004	Jan 2004	1
John Carpenter's Snake Plissken Chronicles	June 2003	Feb 2004	4
American Power	N/a - never published	-	-
Tales of the Realm	Oct 2003	May 2004	5
Snake Plissken Chronicles	June 2003	Feb 2004	4
Rob Zombie's Spookshow International	Nov 2003	July 2004	3
