= Mark Alessi =

American businessman (1953–2019)

- Born: August 28, 1953
- Died: March 29, 2019 (aged 65)
- Occupation: CEO
- Organization(s): Crossgen; TOA Solutions

Mark Albert Alessi (August 28, 1953 – March 29, 2019) was an American businessman who was the CEO of a number of companies, most notably as the founder of comic publisher CrossGen where he created a number of the titles.

== Biography ==
Alessi's first major company was Technical Resource Connection, Inc, which he founded in 1986. He was CEO of this company until 1996, at which time the company was sold to Perot Systems Corporation. He later, in 1998, became founder and publisher of CrossGen comics, which subsequently liquidated in 2004 and the company and its assets were sold to Disney. He then became the CEO of TOA Solutions, Inc., a company that he founded in 2004. He died of a sudden massive coronary arrest on March 29, 2019, at the age of 65.
