= R. A. Salvatore bibliography =

This is a complete bibliography of the written works of American fantasy author R. A. Salvatore.

== Forgotten Realms ==
Series name	sub-series	Book name	Publication date	Start DR	End DR	Author	Co-author	Notes
The Legend of Drizzt	The Icewind Dale Trilogy	The Crystal Shard	1988	1351	1356	R. A. Salvatore	-	
The Legend of Drizzt	The Icewind Dale Trilogy	Streams of Silver	1989	1356	1356	R. A. Salvatore	-	
The Legend of Drizzt	The Icewind Dale Trilogy	The Halfling's Gem	1990	1356	1357	R. A. Salvatore	-	
The Legend of Drizzt	The Dark Elf Trilogy	Homeland	1990	1297	1328	R. A. Salvatore	-	
The Legend of Drizzt	The Dark Elf Trilogy	Exile	1990	1338	1340	R. A. Salvatore	-	
The Legend of Drizzt	The Dark Elf Trilogy	Sojourn	1991	1340	1347	R. A. Salvatore	-	
The Cleric Quintet	N/A	Canticle	1991	1361	1361	R. A. Salvatore	-	
The Cleric Quintet	N/A	In Sylvan Shadows	1992	1361	1361	R. A. Salvatore	-	
The Cleric Quintet	N/A	Night Masks	1992	1361	1361	R. A. Salvatore	-	
The Cleric Quintet	N/A	The Fallen Fortress	1993	1361	1362	R. A. Salvatore	-	
The Cleric Quintet	N/A	The Chaos Curse	1994	1362	1362	R. A. Salvatore	-	
The Legend of Drizzt	Legacy of the Drow	The Legacy	1992	1357	1357	R. A. Salvatore	-	
The Legend of Drizzt	Legacy of the Drow	Starless Night	1993	1357	1357	R. A. Salvatore	-	
The Legend of Drizzt	Legacy of the Drow	Siege of Darkness	1994	1358	1358	R. A. Salvatore	-	
The Legend of Drizzt	Legacy of the Drow	Passage to Dawn	1996	1364	1364	R. A. Salvatore	-	
The Legend of Drizzt	Paths of Darkness	The Silent Blade	1998	1364	1364	R. A. Salvatore	-	
The Legend of Drizzt	Paths of Darkness	The Spine of the World	1999	1365	1369	R. A. Salvatore	-	
The Legend of Drizzt	Paths of Darkness	Sea of Swords	2001	1369	1370	R. A. Salvatore	-	
The Legend of Drizzt	The Sellswords	Servant of the Shard	2000	1366	1366	R. A. Salvatore	-	
The Legend of Drizzt	The Sellswords	Promise of the Witch-King	2005	1370	1370	R. A. Salvatore	-	
The Legend of Drizzt	The Sellswords	Road of the Patriarch	2006	1370	1371	R. A. Salvatore	-	
The Legend of Drizzt	The Hunter's Blades Trilogy	The Thousand Orcs	2002	1370	1370	R. A. Salvatore	-	
The Legend of Drizzt	The Hunter's Blades Trilogy	The Lone Drow	2003	1370	1370	R. A. Salvatore	-	
The Legend of Drizzt	The Hunter's Blades Trilogy	The Two Swords	2004	1370	1371	R. A. Salvatore	-	
War of the Spider Queen	N/A	Dissolution	2002	1372	1372	Richard Lee Byers	-	Each novel in the series is written by a different author with Salvatore overseeing the development of the overall project.
War of the Spider Queen	N/A	Insurrection	2002	1372	1372	Thomas M. Reid	-	Each novel in the series is written by a different author with Salvatore overseeing the development of the overall project.
War of the Spider Queen	N/A	Condemnation	2003	1372	1372	Richard Baker	-	Each novel in the series is written by a different author with Salvatore overseeing the development of the overall project.
War of the Spider Queen	N/A	Extinction	2004	1372	1372	Lisa Smedman	-	Each novel in the series is written by a different author with Salvatore overseeing the development of the overall project.
War of the Spider Queen	N/A	Annihilation	2004	1372	1372	Philip Athans	-	Each novel in the series is written by a different author with Salvatore overseeing the development of the overall project.
War of the Spider Queen	N/A	Resurrection	2005	1372	1372	Paul S. Kemp	-	Each novel in the series is written by a different author with Salvatore overseeing the development of the overall project.
The Legend of Drizzt	Transitions	The Orc King	2007	1371	1471	R. A. Salvatore	-	Published in September; Only the Prologue and epilogue are in 1471
The Legend of Drizzt	Transitions	The Pirate King	2008	1376	1377	R. A. Salvatore	-	Published in October
The Legend of Drizzt	Transitions	The Ghost King	2009	1385	1385	R. A. Salvatore	-	Published in October
Stone of Tymora	N/A	The Stowaway	2008	1350	1362	R. A. Salvatore	Geno Salvatore	Young adult novel; published with son
Stone of Tymora	N/A	The Shadowmask	2009	1356	1362	R. A. Salvatore	Geno Salvatore	Young adult novel; published with son
Stone of Tymora	N/A	The Sentinels	2010	1357	1362	R. A. Salvatore	Geno Salvatore	Young adult novel; published with son
The Legend of Drizzt	Neverwinter Saga	Gauntlgrym	2010	1409	1462	R. A. Salvatore	-	Published in October
The Legend of Drizzt	Neverwinter Saga	Neverwinter	2011	1462	1463	R. A. Salvatore	-	Published in October
The Legend of Drizzt	Neverwinter Saga	Charon's Claw	2012	1463	1463	R. A. Salvatore	-	Published August 7th
The Legend of Drizzt	Neverwinter Saga	The Last Threshold	2013	1463	1484	R. A. Salvatore	-	Published March 5th
The Legend of Drizzt	The Sundering	The Companions	2013	1462	1484	R. A. Salvatore	-	Published August 6th
The Legend of Drizzt	Companions Codex	Night of the Hunter	2014	1484	1484	R. A. Salvatore	-	Published March 14th
The Legend of Drizzt	Companions Codex	Rise of the King	2014	1484	1484	R. A. Salvatore	-	Published in November
The Legend of Drizzt	Companions Codex	Vengeance of the Iron Dwarf	2015	1484	1485	R. A. Salvatore	-	Published March 3rd
The Legend of Drizzt	Homecoming	Archmage	2015-9-1	1485	1486	R. A. Salvatore	-	
The Legend of Drizzt	Homecoming	Maestro	2016-4-5	1487	1487	R. A. Salvatore	-	
The Legend of Drizzt	Homecoming	Hero	2016-10-25	1487	1487	R. A. Salvatore	-	
The Legend of Drizzt	Generations	Timeless	2018-9-4	1488	1488	R. A. Salvatore	-	
The Legend of Drizzt	Generations	Boundless	2019-9-10	1488	1488	R. A. Salvatore	-	
The Legend of Drizzt	Generations	Relentless	2020-7-28	1296	1488	R. A. Salvatore	-	
The Legend of Drizzt	The Way of the Drow	Starlight Enclave	2021-8-3	1490	1490	R. A. Salvatore	-	
The Legend of Drizzt	The Way of the Drow	Glacier's Edge	2022-8-9	-	-	R. A. Salvatore	-	
The Legend of Drizzt	The Way of the Drow	Lolth's Warrior	2023-8-15	1490	-	R. A. Salvatore	-	
The Legend of Drizzt	N/A	The Dao of Drizzt	2022-9-20	-	-	R. A. Salvatore	-	Consists of journal entries by Drizzt
The Legend of Drizzt	(A brand-new series featuring Breezy Do'Urden)	The Finest Edge of Twilight	2025-10-07			R. A. Salvatore		

== Corona ==
=== First Trilogy ===
- The Demon Awakens (1997)
- The Demon Spirit (1998)
- The Demon Apostle (1999)

==== Bridge novel ====
- Mortalis (2000)

=== Second Trilogy ===
- Ascendance (2001)
- Transcendence (2002)
- Immortalis (2003)

=== Saga of the First King ===
- The Highwayman (2004)
- The Ancient (2008)
- The Dame (2009)
- The Bear (2010)

=== The Coven ===
- Child of a Mad God (2018)
- Reckoning of Fallen Gods (2019)
- Song of the Risen God (2020)

=== The Buccaneers ===
- Pinquickle's Folly (2024)
- Witch of Whispervale (2025)

== Other series ==
=== The Spearwielder's Tale ===
- The Woods Out Back (1993)
- The Dragon's Dagger (1994)
- Dragonslayer's Return (1995)

=== Chronicles of Ynis Aielle ===
- Echoes of the Fourth Magic (completed 1987, published 1990)
- The Witch's Daughter (1991)
- Bastion of Darkness (2000)

=== Crimson Shadow series ===
- The Sword of Bedwyr (1995)
- Luthien's Gamble (1996)
- The Dragon King (1996)

== Star Wars ==
- Star Wars Episode II: Attack of the Clones (film novelization, 2002)

=== Star Wars: The New Jedi Order ===
- Vector Prime (1999)

== Other novels ==
- Tarzan: The Epic Adventures

== Short stories ==
- "The First Notch" (in Dragon magazine #152, 1989)
- "A Sparkle for Homer" (in Halflings, Hobbits, Warrows, and Weefolk, 1991)
- "Dark Mirror" (in Realms of Valor, 1993)
- "The Third Level" (in Realms of Infamy, 1994)
- "Guenhwyvar" (in Realms of Magic, 1995)
- "The Coach With Big Teeth" (in Otherwere, 1996 and Unfettered, 2013)
- "Gods' Law" (in Tales of Tethedril, 1998)
- "Mather's Blood" (in Dragon magazine #252, 1998)
- "That Curious Sword" (in Realms of Shadow, 2002)
- "Three Ships" (in Demons Wars: Trial By Fire Comic TP, 2003)
- "Empty Joys" (in The Best of the Realms, 2003)
- "The Dowry" (in The Highwayman, 2004)
- "Wickless In the Nether" (in Realms of Dragons, 2004)
- "Comrades at Odds" (in Realms of the Elves, 2006)
- "If Ever They Happen Upon My Lair" (in Dragons: World Afire, 2006)
- "Bones and Stones" (in Realms of War, 2008)
- "Iruladoon" (in Realms of the Dead, 2010)
- "Hugo Mann's Perfect Soul" (in The Guide to Writing Fantasy and Science Fiction: 6 Steps to Writing and Publishing Your Bestseller, 2010)
- "To Legend He Goes" (in Legend of Drizzt Anthology, 2011)

== Graphic novel adaptations ==
- Homeland
- Exile
- Sojourn
- The Crystal Shard
- Streams of Silver
- Trial by Fire (2001)
- The Halfling's Gem
- Eye for an Eye
- Legacy
- Starless Night (Incomplete, only 1 of 3 issues published)

== Comics ==
- Spooks (with co-authors Larry Hama and Ryan Schifrin, and art by Adam Archer, Devil's Due Publishing, 2008)
- Dungeons & Dragons: The Legend of Drizzt: Neverwinter Tales (with art by Agustín Padilla, IDW Publishing, 2011)
- Dungeons & Dragons: The Legend of Drizzt: Cutter (with Geno Salvatore)

== Other media ==
- The Accursed Tower, A 2nd Edition AD&D Module
- Demon Stone role-playing Game released on PS2, Xbox, and PC
- In collaboration with Seven Swords, R A Salvatore created the bot chat responses for the computer game Quake 3 Arena
- Kingdoms of Amalur: Reckoning; role-playing game released for Xbox 360, PS3, and PC February 2012
