= Corona (fictional world) =

Fictional world, setting of works of R.A. Salvatore

Corona is the name of the fantasy world in which R. A. Salvatore's The DemonWars Saga, The Highwayman and The Coven series are all set.

== Geography ==
It can be noted that the world of Corona bears a striking resemblance to Eastern Canada. Major rivers as well as landmasses are shown. The area titled as Alpinador is in the same location and has the same basic shape as Labrador.

Several populated areas of Corona have been introduced in the novels to date.

=== Alpinador ===
Alpinador is the home of the Alpinadorans, a somewhat barbaric race of tall, strong men and women. The ranger Andacanavar is an Alpinadoran. This is the northernmost and most mountainous known nation of Corona. As a result, it is bitingly cold most of the year.

=== Andur'Blough Inninness ===
Also known as the "Valley of Mists" or the "Forest of Cloud", Andur'Blough Inninness is the hidden home of the Touel'alfar, the winged elves who raise and train the few human rangers of the world. The land is ruled by Lady Dasslerond, the queen of the Touel'alfar. It is the place where Elbryan Wyndon, the Nightbird, was raised and trained after his home, Dundalis, was destroyed. After the events of the novel Immortalis, Lady Dasslerond is replaced by Belli'mar Juraviel as ruler.

=== The Barbican ===
The Barbican is a region of dangerous mountainous wilderness in the northwest of Corona.

==== Mount Aida ====
In The Demon Awakens, this volcanic mountain is the unholy lair of the demon dactyl Bestesbulzibar, but becomes a site of holy power after Avelyn Desbris slays the monster.

Avelyn's mummified arm, which extends out of the flattened mountaintop, has significant magical power. Whenever any evil creature sets foot upon the plateau, waves of holy power turn the creature to dust. As of the events of the novel Mortalis and the spreading of the smallpox-like "rosy plague", a small amount of blood can always be found oozing from Avelyn's palm. Anyone who touches his or her lips to the blood is cured of the rosy plague and is forever after immune to the disease. After news of the arm's power had spread across Corona, pilgrims have travelled regularly to the site, and (in the novel Immortalis) Avelyn was canonized as a saint of the Abellican Church.

=== Behren ===
Behren is the southernmost kingdom in the world of Corona; however, it is known that impenetrable jungles exist to the south of that land. Behren is ruled by religious clerics called Yatols, the most important of them being the Chezru Chieftain, Yakim Douan. However, the ruling system of Behren begins to break down after the events of the novel Transcendence. Behren's key city is Jacintha, the largest known city in Corona.

=== The Belt-and-Buckle ===
The Belt-and-Buckle mountain range is one of the most distinctive physical landmarks in Corona. It divides Honce-the-Bear to the north from Behren and To-Gai to the south. Bogs and dark forests cover the northern foothills of the westernmost known part of the mountain range.

==== Tymwyvenne ====
Tymwyvenne is a city in the darkest part of the bogs of the Belt-and-Buckle. So dense is the canopy that no light penetrates to the ground. This city is the home of the Doc'alfar, the dark elves. These elves have long been separated from the Touel'alfar, after a plague devastated the Doc'alfar population, doing virtually nothing to the Touel'alfar. In meeting a member of their fabled cousin race, the Touel'alfar, they were at first suspicious, but eventually befriended Juraviel since the events of the novel Transcendence. The ruler of Tymwyvenne is King Eltiraaz.

=== Honce-the-Bear ===
Honce-the-Bear is the preeminent kingdom in the DemonWars Saga. It is ruled by the Ursal line of kings, specifically Danube Brock Ursal and then his brother, Midalis Ursal, in the Saga. The most important cities in the kingdom are Ursal, the capital of the kingdom; Palmaris; and Entel. Finally, there is St.-Mere-Abelle, the most important monastery in the Abellican Church. St.-Mere-Abelle holds perhaps the greatest collection of magical gemstones in the world.

==== All Saints Bay ====
This body of water is a wedge-shaped extension of the Bay of Corona, which juts into Honce-the-Bear just south of the Masur Delaval. Docks on this bay constitute the second of two entrances to St.-Mere-Abelle.

==== Gulf of Corona ====
The Gulf of Corona is an extension of the Mirianic Ocean. Invaders from the Julianthes typically attack throughout the gulf's coastal region. The gulf is defended from those and other attackers by seaside forts defended by the Coastpoint Guards, three contingents of Kingsmen: Pireth Vanguard on the northern coast, Pireth Tulme on the southern coast, and Pireth Dancard on an island directly between the other two.

==== Masur Delaval ====
The Gulf of Corona is fed by the Masur Delaval. The Masur Delaval's mouth is in the northwestern corner of the Gulf of Corona. The Masur Delaval extends straight southwest to the city of Ursal. The city of Palmaris sits on northern bank of the Masur Delaval, near its mouth on the Gulf of Corona. On the opposite bank from Palmaris is the smaller city of Amvoy.

=== Mirianic Ocean ===
The only known ocean allows for travel between Alpinador, Honce-the-Bear, the Julianthes, Pimaninicuit, and Behren. It extends into Honce-the-Bear as the Bay of Corona.

==== The Julianthes ====
These islands, located in the distant northwest of the known Mirianic Ocean, are also known as "the Weathered Isles". They are home to the powrie dwarves, also known as "bloody caps".

==== The Pirate Shoals ====
This collection of islands off the southern coast of Behren is home to many pirates, as its name implies.

=== The Mountains of Fire ===
This volcanic mountain range exists along the southernmost part of the border between To-Gai and Behren. The Walk of Clouds monastery is here.

==== The Walk of Clouds ====
The monastery home of the Jhesta Tu mystics rests on the edge of the Mountains of Fire.

=== Pimaninicuit ===
This equatorial island is where the brothers of St.-Mere-Abelle retrieve the gemstones with which they work their magic. The stones fall onto the island from the sky in dangerous showers approximately once every 173 years, and the monks must retrieve and prepare the gems before they can be used. If the monks fail to do so within a short period of time, the gems lose their magical potential and become ordinary (if valuable) jewels.

The location of the island is a secret even to most of the Abellican Order. Only the Father Abbot, the order's leader, has the authority to share the secret. Those that learn of or share knowledge of Pimaninicuit's existence or location without the express approval of the Father Abbot face death by order of the Church.

=== The Timberlands ===
Made up of the villages of Dundalis, End o' the World and Weedy Meadow, this area is still a wild land inhabited by hardy folk. It is the land from which Elbryan Wyndon and Jilseponie Ault came.

=== To-gai ===
To-gai is the home of the nomadic To-gai-ru, who were under the heel of the Behrenese until the arrival and subsequent actions of Brynn Dharielle. The region consists primarily of vast plains and steppes.

=== The Wilderlands ===
'The Wilderlands' is the name given to a vast, unclaimed, and inhospitable land. It lies to the north and west of Honce-the-Bear and the Timberlands, and to the west of Alpinador. It is west of Andur'Blough Inninness, and south and west of the Barbican.

==== The Moorlands ====
The Moorlands lie directly between Andur'Blough Inninness and the Timberlands. The region is covered with shallow, stagnant water.

== History ==
Corona's timeframe is recorded in the novels according to the reckoning of the Abellican Church. Time is recorded as "God's Year" followed by the year, counted as the number of years since the death of Saint Abelle. For example, God's Year 74 would be the 74th year after Saint Abelle's death. The current year as of the chronologically latest novel, Immortalis, is God's Year 857.

- 47 - Brother Bran Dynard of the Abellican Church begins his Journey Proselyt, leaving Pryd Town in the land of Honce for Behren.
- 54 - Brother Bran Dynard leaves the Walk of Clouds monastery with his wife, Sen Wi, to return to his church in Pryd Town.
- Late 1st century - Laird Deleval names himself the first King of Honce. This begins a civil war which ends with the city of Deleval renamed Ursal and Dame Gwydre and Laird Bannagran become the first true King and Queen of Honce-the-Bear
- 111 - King Bannagran dies. An abbey in his honor is declared and planned in the capital, establishing the Abellican church as the dominant religion
- c. 516 - Bestesbulzibar, a demon dactyl, awakens. It initiates a war (called Co'awille or 'Endwar' by the elves) that decimated the elf population and leads to the self-seclusion of the elves. Terranen Dinoniel dies while defeating the dactyl.
- 6th century - King Archibald the Red incites a bloody five-year civil war after upsetting the aristocracy. (Precise dates unknown)
- c. 700 - Brother Allarbarnet wanders unsettled parts of the Wilderlands and Honce-the-Bear, planting apple groves.
- 796 - Avelyn Desbris is born.
- 804 - Elbryan Wyndon and Jilseponie Ault are born; Jilseponie is the younger of the two by five months.
- 808 - Avelyn Desbris begins his theological education.
- 816 - Bestesbulzibar awakens again. Avelyn Desbris enters St.-Mere-Abelle. The town of Dundalis is destroyed.
- 821 - A Ring Stone shower occurs on Pimaninicuit.
- 823 - Elbryan Wyndon is initiated as a ranger, taking the name "Nightbird".
- 827 - The rosy plague begins ravaging the population of Honce-the-Bear.
- 828 - Abbot Je'howeth of St. Honce dies. Merwick Pemblebury Ursal is born.
- 829 - Torrence Pemblebury Ursal is born.
- 830 - Brother Francis Delacourt dies from the rosy plague, helping its victims against the will of the Abellian Church who had closed its monasteries to prevent the plague from infecting monks.
- 831 - The Second Miracle of Avelyn occurs, when blood begins to flow from Avelyn's mummified hand. (Any person who partakes of the blood directly from Avelyn's palm is totally cured of and protected against the rosy plague.)
- 834 - The rosy plague ends. Jilseponie Wyndon is appointed Baroness of Palmaris.
- 839 - The Chapel of Avelyn Desbris is founded in Caer Tinella, with Braumin Herde presiding as Parson. Baroness Jilseponie Wyndon of Palmaris becomes Bishop of Palmaris.
- 840 - Bishop Jilseponie Wyndon marries King Danube Brock Ursal, becomes Queen Jilseponie Wyndon Ursal. Braumin Herde becomes Bishop of Palmaris.
- 841 - Father Abbot Agronguerre dies. Master Fio Bou-Raiy is elected the new Father Abbot.
- 846 - Aydrian Wyndon murders King Danube Brock Ursal and his heirs Merwick and Torrence. Aydrian takes the title King Aydrian Baudabras, initiating a civil war against the rightful heir to the throne, Prince Midalis Dan Ursal. Lady Dasslerond sacrifices her life in a spell to hide Andur'Blough Inninness. (See Tel'ne'kin Dinoniel, below.) Belli'mar Juraviel becomes leader of the now dispossessed Touel'alfer.
- 847 - Father Abbot Fio Bou-raiy is killed by Aydrian. Prince Midalis officially claims his rightful place as King of all Honce-the-Bear.
- 857 - Aydrian Wyndon breaks Lady Dasslerond's spell and cleanses Bestesbulzibar's stain, leaving Andur'Blough Inninness free and untainted for the Touel'alfar to reclaim. Jilseponie Wyndon Ursal dies; she is given the title of ranger and is buried in the same grove as Elbryan and Mather.

== Magic ==
=== Gemstone magic ===
In this world, most magic is done by the monks of the Abellican Church using the 'sacred' gemstones collected from Pimanincuit. Each stone has a unique set of powers that is related to its type. Larger stones have more power, although the effect created also depends upon the stamina and natural talent of the stone's user. The gems are also known as 'Ring Stones'.

==== Common stones ====
Most magical gemstones fit into these categories, both by type and by function, but a few do not. (See Unique stones, below.)

- Amber: allows the user to walk on water.
- Cabochon garnet: allows the user to detect the use of stone magic. It is sometimes called a 'carbuncle' or 'Dragon's Sight'.
- Celestine: can be thrown to create a firecracker-like explosion. Unlike other stones, a celestine is destroyed in creating its effect.
- Chrysoberyl: allows the user to see in the dark. It is often called a 'cat's-eye'.
- Clear quartz: allows the user to see as if he were in another place.
- Diamond: projects light.
- Emerald: allows the user to walk faster.
- Graphite: creates a blast of lightning.
- Hematite: the most powerful and versatile common stone, can create a variety of effects relating to the soul. It can be used to perform astral projection, letting the user's soul float free of its physical body. In that state, the user can instinctively possess the bodies of others or attack others in a sort of combat involving only sheer will power. Possessing a body is a difficult task especially if the host has a strong will. The hematite can also be used to heal injuries or fight diseases with a touch. However, fighting disease is dangerous to the user because the disease can very easily infect him. A hematite is often called a 'soul stone'.
- Magnetite: allows the user to detect metal, repel metal, or create an incredibly strong attraction between the stone and any one metal object. The last function allows the magnetite to be used as a projectile weapon.
- Malachite: creates an intangible energy field within which any matter becomes as light as air.
- Ruby: creates a spherical blast of fire. The user is no less vulnerable to the fire than any other person.
- Serpentine: creates an intangible green barrier that blocks fire and heat.
- Smoky quartz: creates a false image that the user has imagined.
- Sunstone: can nullify or diminish all other magic within an area. A sunstone can neutralize poison if the user is touching the poison victim. Inversely, it can inflict a magical poison upon someone if the user touches or uses the stone to touch broken skin on the victim.
- Tiger's paw: turns the user partially into a tiger. Most users can only turn one arm into a tiger's foreleg, but some masters can make other changes, including turning entirely into an animal.

==== Unique stones ====
A rare few magical gemstones do not fit into the categories mentioned above, generally possessing far more power than normal.

- Avelyn's amethyst: could only be activated by destroying it. Avelyn Desbris used Tempest, Elbryan Wyndon's sword, to break the amethyst in order to slay Bestesbulzibar. The stone, the largest magical gemstone yet recorded, unleashed incredible magical energy: it blasted clean many square miles of land and obliterated the peak of Mount Aida. Avelyn and Bestesbulzibar died in the blast, and Avelyn's body was encased in rock and mummified, so that only his arm was left above the surface. As his last act, the monk preserved Tempest and his collection of magical gemstones above the rock for his companions to claim.
- Tel'ne'kin Dinoniel: is an emerald larger than a fist, known as the 'gem of the precious land'. It is held by the leader of the Touel'alfar. The stone lacks the typical power of an emerald, but has been known to allow its user to teleport, control plants, create impenetrable earthen barriers, and hide areas (making them harder or impossible to locate, even if one knows the way).
- A'bu'kin Dinoniel: is a sapphire larger than a fist, known as the 'gem of the air and mists'. It is held by the leader of the Doc'alfar. Tel'ne'kin Dinoniel and A'bu'kin Dinoniel share a mystical link of some sort.

==== Gemstone-empowered magic items ====
Magical items have been created by attaching Ring Stones to other objects. Sometimes, an item enchanted this way can make magic without requiring its user to know how to use gemstone magic.

- Dosey's brooch: is a large piece of golden jewelry. The center is a large hematite, ringed by tiny clear-crystal quartz stones. The quartz guides the hematite; if a person who knows how to use gemstone magic uses the hematite to separate his spirit from his body, his spirit is propelled by the brooch almost instantaneously to the presence of Bestesbulzibar, the demon dactyl. The brooch was destroyed in The Demon Awakens.
- Sadye's lute: is a jewel-encrusted instrument. The lute creates subtle emotional effects on those who hear it when it is used to play music. It has differing powers dependent upon what song it is used to play.
- Aydrian's Armor: a hematite is set in the center, over his heart. Around the hematite is a circle of magnetite stones for added protection against metallic weapons and projectiles
- Elbryan Wyndon's sword, Tempest: the sunstone in the sword's pommel is able to nullify magic with the sword blade to cut through magical defenses
- Jilseponie Wyndon's sword, Defender: the magnetite in the pommel can be activated to deflect metallic weapons to the sword rather than at the bearer
- Brynn Dharielle's sword, Flamedancer: can be activated to engulf the blade in flame
- Chezru Chieftain Yakim Douan's Chalice: contains a hematite in the base which allows the user to heal himself or spirit walk
- Cat's Eye Head band: allows the wearer to see in the dark
- Marcalo De'Unnero's hematite ring: allows for constant regeneration.

=== Earth magic ===
Demon dactyls work magic through the power of earth, and has also been described as hell magic. Specifically, they draw power from magma, and their magic grows more powerful when they are closer to it. The only known demon dactyl, Bestesbulzibar, has been known to attack enemies with waves of lava and magically animated stone statues. He also had the power to fire out black or red (the red were more powerful and presumably he needed to near magma to use them) bolts of lightning that he could guide with his own will.

==== Demon-forged magic items ====
Demons have created magic items by instilling them with power while they are being forged.

- Bestesbulzibar's bracers: were forged for his mortal generals. These bracers prevented their wearers from suffering any harm from weapons. How they worked was that any weapon aimed at them would miss regardless of the users skill with it. The bracers, however, had their limitations and couldn't protect the wearer from a large fire, since a constantly burning flame was too much for it to ward off. A sunstone's antimagic effect could also nullify the protection.
- Bestesbulzibar's spike: glowed with the heat of liquid magma constantly and was made to home in on Elbryan and his group. The heat from it could melt rock and create a constant flow of magma.

=== Innate magic ===
Some creatures, such as centaurs, demons, and elves, have shown the ability to cast spells and use other sorts of magic without intermediary tools such as Ring Stones. Although such creatures can work magic without intermediary tools, they are usually more powerful when they do use such tools.

== Novels published ==
Listed in order of publication

=== First Trilogy ===
- The Demon Awakens (1997)
- The Demon Spirit (1998)
- The Demon Apostle (1999)

=== Bridge ===
- Mortalis (2000)

=== Second Trilogy ===
- Ascendance (2001)
- Transcendence (2002)
- Immortalis (2003)

=== Saga of the First King ===
- The Highwayman (2004)
- The Ancient (2008)
- The Dame (2009)
- The Bear (2010)

=== Tale of the Coven ===
- Child of a Mad God (2018)
- Reckoning of Fallen Gods (2019)
- Song of the Risen God (2020)

=== The Buccaneers ===
- Pinquickle's Folly (2024)
- The Witch of Whispervale (2025)
