= List of fantasy worlds =

This is a list of fictional fantasy worlds and lands. The best-known lands or worlds, not necessarily the most encompassing, are listed. For example, Middle-earth is only a region of Arda in J. R. R. Tolkien's fictional universe, but it is far better known.

Media key:

Listed chronologically.
A: anime and manga
C: comics and graphic novels
F: films
G: tabletop games
N: novels and short stories
O: other
P: plays
R: radio
T: television
V: video games

Fantasy worlds
Setting	Creator	Description	First appearance	Year	Media
Abeir-Toril	Ed Greenwood	The planet that serves as the setting of the Dungeons & Dragons campaign setting Forgotten Realms.	Darkwalker on Moonshae	1987	G N C V F
Adventure Time world (Land of Ooo)	Pendleton Ward	A world composed of a vast ocean and a single continent, as well as some planets and several parallel universes. Is later revealed to be set after the Mushroom War, a war which destroyed civilization a thousand years prior to the series' events.	Adventure Time	2007	T
Archipelago	Katherine Rundell	A series of islands in the North Atlantic Ocean.	Impossible Creatures Book	2023	N
Alagaësia	Christopher Paolini	A continent in Christopher Paolini's The Inheritance Cycle and in The Fork, the Witch, and the Worm (Tales from Alagaësia).	Eragon	2003	N F
Albion	Lionhead Studios	Primary setting of the Fable series.	Fable	2004	V N
Almea	Mark Rosenfelder	A fantasy world built in part to house Rosenfelder's many artistic constructed languages.	zompist.com	2006	O
Asgard	Stan Lee, Larry Lieber, Jack Kirby	Marvel Comics realm based on Norse mythology.	Journey into Mystery	1962	C T F V
Avalon	Stan Lee, Jack Kirby	Marvel Comics realm based on Welsh mythology.	Fantastic Four	1966	C
Averoigne	Clark Ashton Smith	A fictional French province.	The End of the Story	1930	N
Azeroth	Blizzard Entertainment	Primary setting of the Warcraft franchise.	Warcraft: Orcs & Humans	1994	A C F G V N
Barsoom	Edgar Rice Burroughs	A version of Mars inhabited by various species of intelligent life	Under the Moons of Mars	1912	N C F G
Bas-Lag	China Miéville	Setting of several China Miéville novels, a world where magic and steampunk technology exist and many intelligent races live. It is influenced by tropes of science fiction, fantasy, and horror.	Perdido Street Station	2000	N
Blue Planet	Eiichiro Oda	A world composed of a vast ocean and a single continent.	One Piece	1997	A V N
Continent	Andrzej Sapkowski	The fantasy setting of The Witcher franchise.	The Witcher	1986	C F G N T V
Corona	R. A. Salvatore	World of The DemonWars Saga and The Highwayman	The Demon Awakens	1997	N
Darkover	Marion Zimmer Bradley	A science fantasy series set on a planet colonized by humans, inhabited by native intelligent races.	The Planet Savers	1958	N G
Deltora	Emily Rodda	The setting for the Deltora Quest series of children's novels	The Forests of Silence	2000	N A V
Destiny Islands and other worlds	Square	Various worlds that make up the setting of the Kingdom Hearts franchise. Some worlds, like Destiny Islands, are original worlds created for the series, while others are based on Disney films.	Kingdom Hearts	2002	V M
Dinotopia	James Gurney	An island where humans and dinosaurs peacefully coexist.	Dinotopia: A Land Apart from Time	1992	N T F V
Discworld	Terry Pratchett	A vast disc of land resting on four elephants which stand on a giant turtle. Setting of the Discworld series.	The Colour of Magic	1983	N V M G T
Draenor (Outland)	Blizzard Entertainment	Homeworld of the orcs and ogres in the Warcraft franchise. Connected to Azeroth via the dark portal.	Warcraft: Orcs & Humans	1994	A C F G V N
Dragon World	Akira Toriyama	The setting of Toriyama's works, mainly Dragon Ball.	Wonder Island	1979	A C F T V
Dreamlands	H. P. Lovecraft and others	An alternate dimension entered only via dreams.	Polaris	1918	N G
Dying Earth	Jack Vance	A worn-out Earth with a dying Sun in the far distant future where magic prevails.	The Dying Earth	1950	N G
Earthsea	Ursula K. Le Guin	A planet consisting of numerous islands.	The Word of Unbinding	1964	N T R A
Eberron	Keith Baker	A campaign setting for Dungeons & Dragons.	Eberron Campaign Setting	2004	G N C V
Emelan	Tamora Pierce	Setting of the Emelan series of novels	Sandry's Book	1997	N
Encantadia	Suzette Doctolero	A realm that serves as the setting for the Encantadia Filipino franchise.	Encantadia	2005	T F V
Equestria	Lauren Faust	The setting of the fourth and fifth generations of the My Little Pony franchise.	My Little Pony: Friendship Is Magic	2010	T C V
Eternia	Roger Sweet	The home world of the Masters of the Universe animated series.		1981	O C N V T F
Etheria	Larry DiTillio; J. Michael Straczynski	The mythical world of the She-Ra: Princess of Power animated series.	She-Ra: Princess of Power	1985	T O C
Exandria	Matt Mercer	Setting for the Dungeons & Dragons games played on the web series Critical Role.	Critical Role	2018	O G T
Filgaia	Media.Vision	Multiple worlds sharing the same name. The main setting of the Wild Arms series.	Wild Arms	1996	A V
The Four Lands	Terry Brooks	A post-apocalyptic Pacific Northwest following a nuclear holocaust and the setting for the Shannara novel series	The Sword of Shannara	1977	N V T
The Four Nations	Michael Dante DiMartino; Bryan Konietzko	The setting of the Avatar: The Last Airbender franchise	Avatar: The Last Airbender	2005	T F C V
Gielinor	Jagex Limited	Primary setting for RuneScape and Old School RuneScape.	RuneScape Classic	2001	V M
Glorantha	Greg Stafford	The setting of numerous tabletop games, including RuneQuest and HeroQuest	White Bear and Red Moon	1975	G V N C
Gor	John Norman	A planet in the Solar System	Tarnsman of Gor	1966	N F
Green–sky	Zilpha Keatley Snyder	Setting of the Green Sky Trilogy of novels	Below the Root	1975	N V
Greyhawk	Gary Gygax	A campaign setting for Dungeons & Dragons.	World of Greyhawk Fantasy Game Setting	1980	G N
Halkeginia	Noboru Yamaguchi	A world whose social structure is similar to that of medieval Europe.	The Familiar of Zero	2004	N A
Fictional universe of Harry Potter	J. K. Rowling	The Wizarding World co-exists with and is mainly hidden from the mundane world of the non-magical Muggles.	Harry Potter and the Philosopher's Stone	1997	N F G P
The Homelands	Bill Willingham	Setting of the Fables comics and spin-offs based on fairy tales, folklore, and nursery rhymes.	Legends in Exile	2002	C V
Hyborian Age	Robert E. Howard	A fictional prehistoric period of Earth's history placed by most around 10,000 BC, in which Conan the Barbarian rampaged.	The Phoenix on the Sword	1932	N C G F V T
Hyrule	Shigeru Miyamoto; Takashi Tezuka	A kingdom that is the main setting of The Legend of Zelda franchise.	The Legend of Zelda	1986	A C N T V
Ivalice	Yasumi Matsuno	Setting of multiple video games, including Final Fantasy Tactics, Vagrant Story, Final Fantasy Tactics Advance, and Final Fantasy XII.	Final Fantasy Tactics	1997	A R V
Krynn	Margaret Weis, Tracy Hickman, and numerous others	Setting of the Dragonlance games and novels, Dungeons & Dragons RPG.	Dragons of Despair	1984	G N V C F
Kulthea (Shadow World)	Terry K. Amthor	Setting of the Rolemaster RPG.	The Iron Wind	1980	G N
The Land	Stephen R. Donaldson	Location of The Chronicles of Thomas Covenant series of novels.	Lord Foul's Bane	1977	N
Magic Kingdom of Landover	Terry Brooks	Setting for six novels and two short stories	Magic Kingdom for Sale—Sold!	1986	N
Lankhmar	Fritz Leiber	A city on the primitive world of Nehwon, home of the rogues Fafhrd and the Gray Mouser.	Two Sought Adventure	1939	N G C
Malazan World	Steven Erikson	Setting of the Malazan Books of the Fallen novels	Gardens of the Moon	1999	N
Magic: The Gathering multiverse	Richard Garfield	A collection of planes, including Dominaria, where most of the action occurs.	Magic: The Gathering	1993	G N C V
Magnamund	Joe Dever, Ben Dever and Vincent Lazzari	Lone Wolf gamebooks and d20 system.	Flight from the Dark	1984	N V G
Melniboné	Michael Moorcock	Island homeland of Elric of Melniboné.	The Dreaming City	1961	N C G
Middle-earth	J. R. R. Tolkien	The setting for The Lord of the Rings and The Hobbit. See also Arda, which Middle-earth is part of.	The Hobbit	1937	N P F R C G V
Mid-World	Stephen King	The setting for King's The Dark Tower novel series	"The Little Sisters of Eluria"	1998	N C V F
Mushroom Kingdom	Shigeru Miyamoto	Primary setting of the Mario franchise.	Super Mario Bros.	1985	A C N T V
Myst worlds	Rand Miller; Robyn Miller	Various worlds, referred to as "Ages", featured in the Myst franchise.	Myst	1993	V N C G
Mystara	Lawrence Schick, Tom Moldvay et al.	Setting of the Dungeons & Dragons RPG, initially the Known World.	The Isle of Dread	1981	G N V
Narnia	C. S. Lewis	Setting for The Chronicles of Narnia series of children's novels.	The Lion, the Witch and the Wardrobe	1950	N T R P F
Neverland	J. M. Barrie	A fictional island, home to Peter Pan.	Peter Pan; or, the Boy Who Wouldn't Grow Up	1904	P F T V R
Nirn	Bethesda Game Studios	The primary setting of The Elder Scrolls franchise.	The Elder Scrolls: Arena	1994	N V G
Norrath	Daybreak Games	The primary setting of the Everquest franchise	Everquest	1999	V N
Land of Oz	L. Frank Baum	A magical country in which fourteen Baum children's novels are set.	The Wonderful Wizard of Oz	1900	N P F T
Pellucidar	Edgar Rice Burroughs	Another world located 500 miles underneath the Earth's surface.	At the Earth's Core	1914	N C F T
Pern	Anne McCaffrey	A planet settled by humans using spaceships. Setting for the science fantasy Dragonriders of Pern series. Note that McCaffrey considered herself a writer of science fiction, not fantasy.	Weyr Search	1967	N G C V
Planescape Multiverse	TSR, Inc.	The planes of existence beyond the standard worlds of the Dungeons & Dragons game, most detailed in the Planescape setting.	Manual of the Planes	1987	G N V
Prydain	Lloyd Alexander	The country of The Chronicles of Prydain, consisting of five children's novels and assorted short stories.	The Book of Three	1964	N F
Rifts	Kevin Siembieda	Setting of the Rifts role playing game by Palladium Books.	Rifts: Role-Playing Game	1990	G N V
Rokugan	John Zinser et al.	Setting of Legend of the Five Rings, based on historical East Asian cultures.	Legend of the Five Rings collectible card game	1995	G N
Sanctuary	Blizzard Entertainment	Setting for the dark fantasy video game series Diablo	Diablo	1997	C N V
Sartorias-deles	Sherwood Smith	Setting for many of the books by Sherwood Smith	Crown Duel	1997	N
Spira	Yoshinori Kitase, Motomu Toriyama	The world in which Final Fantasy X and Final Fantasy X-2 take place.	Final Fantasy X	2001	V
Star Wars	George Lucas	The main setting for the Star Wars franchise	Star Wars: Episode IV – A New Hope	1977	F C T N V
Temerant	Patrick Rothfuss	The setting for The Name of the Wind and The Wise Man's Fear.	The Name of the Wind	2007	N
Tékumel	M. A. R. Barker	A technological world is suddenly cast into a "pocket dimension". Reversing the usual sequence of events, Barker spent decades building his elaborate, detailed world before designing the initial tabletop role-playing game.	Empire of the Petal Throne	1974	G N
Thedas	BioWare	The primary setting of the Dragon Age franchise.	Dragon Age: Origins	2009	V N C A G
Thieves' World	Robert Asprin	A collective setting for stories by numerous authors.	Thieves' World	1979	N T C
Titan	Marc Gascoigne, Steve Jackson, Ian Livingstone	Fighting Fantasy gamebooks and RPG.	Titan: The Fighting Fantasy World	1986	G N
Tortall	Tamora Pierce	Setting of the Tortall series of books.	Alanna: The First Adventure	1983	N
Tyria	ArenaNet	Setting for the Guild Wars series.	Guild Wars	2005	V N
Uresia	S. John Ross	Anime-inspired setting for Big Eyes, Small Mouth and d20 system RPGs.	Uresia: Grave of Heaven	2003	G
Warhammer	Bryan Ansell, Richard Halliwell, Rick Priestley	The setting of the Warhammer franchise.	Warhammer The Mass Combat Fantasy Role-Playing Game	1983	G N V C
Westeros	George R. R. Martin	The continent in which most of the A Song of Ice and Fire series takes place.	A Game of Thrones	1996	N T C V
Witch World	Andre Norton	A world in a parallel universe where magic works.	Witch World	1963	N G
Wheel of Time World	Robert Jordan	A world and the setting where the novel series The Wheel of Time takes place	Eye of the World	1990	N T G V
Wonderland	Lewis Carroll	An underground realm accessed through a rabbit hole.	Alice's Adventures in Wonderland	1865	N P F C T
World of Two Moons	Wendy and Richard Pini	An Earth-like world, the setting of the Elfquest comic book series.	"Fire and Flight"	1978	C G
World of Darkness	Mark Rein-Hagen	Setting of the series of tabletop role-playing games of the same name, where "vampires, werewolves, and wizards lurking behind our mundane reality."	Vampire: The Masquerade	1991	G V T C O
Xanth	Piers Anthony	Locale for forty-four novels and counting.	A Spell for Chameleon	1977	N G V
Yonderland	Mathew Baynton; Simon Farnaby; Jim Howick; Martha Howe-Douglas; Ben Willbond; Laurence Rickard	Nation within the world of The Twelve Realms where most of the eponymous series takes place.	Yonderland	2013	T
Yrth	Steve Jackson Games	GURPS Fantasy setting	Orcslayer	1985	G
Zothique	Clark Ashton Smith	Setting of the Zothique cycle of short stories.	The Empire of the Necromancers	1932	N

== See also ==
- Imaginary world
- Simulated reality
- Planets in science fiction
- List of fictional shared universes in film and television
