= Maternal mortality in fiction =

Maternal death in fiction is a common theme encountered in literature, film, and other media.

The death of a mother during pregnancy, childbirth or immediately afterwards is a tragic event. The chances of a child surviving such an extreme birth are compromised. In literature, the death of a new mother is a powerful device: it removes one character and places the surviving child into an often hostile environment which has to be overcome.

== Literature ==
=== 11th century ===
- In Murasaki Shikibu's novel The Tale of Genji, Genji's first wife, Aoi no Ue, was suffering from an attack of Lady Rokujō's spirit during her pregnancy. She died after giving birth to her son Yūgiri.

=== 18th century ===
- In Cao Xueqin's novel Dream of the Red Chamber, Xiang Ling, the maid and concubine of Xue Pan, dies in childbirth, giving birth to her daughter Ning Xiner. However, this plot only appears in Gao E's continuation; the original author only demonstrates her fate is death in a poem.

=== 19th century ===
- In the Grimm Brothers' Snow White, Snow White's mother died in childbirth. Soon afterwards, her father married a new wife who was beautiful, but very vain, and possessed supernatural powers.
- In Leo Tolstoy's War and Peace, Liza Bolkonskaya, wife of Prince Andrei, dies giving birth to a son called Nikolai.
- In Charles Dickens' novel Oliver Twist, the title character's mother, Agnes, dies giving birth to him.
- In the 1891 play Spring Awakening by Frank Wedekind and the contemporary musical of the same name, Wendla dies from a botched abortion.
- In Jane Austen's Northanger Abbey, Austen ridicules the convention of heroines having mothers who die in childbirth, by beginning the novel: "No one who had ever seen Catherine Morland in her infancy would have supposed her born to be a heroine. Her situation in life, the character of her father and mother... were all equally against her... Her mother was a woman of useful plain sense, with a good temper, and, what is more remarkable, with a good constitution. She had three sons before Catherine was born; and instead of dying in bringing the latter into the world, as anybody might expect, she still lived on."
- In Emily Brontë's Wuthering Heights, Catherine Earnshaw goes into early labor and dies after giving birth to her daughter, Catherine Linton.
- In Elizabeth Gaskell's Mary Barton, when the heroine is a young girl, her mother dies in childbirth along with the baby, after being deeply affected by the grief of her sister Esther's disappearance, leaving Mary to be brought up by her father John.
- Fanny Robin in Thomas Hardy's Far From the Madding Crowd dies in childbirth along with the child, who was fathered by Frank Troy, Bathsheba's husband.
- In Henry James' Washington Square, Catherine Sloper's mother dies shortly after her birth, and the death of his beautiful and talented wife permanently alters Dr. Sloper and causes him to be cold and unfeeling towards Catherine.
- Lucetta Farfrae, formerly Lucette Le Sueur, in Thomas Hardy's The Mayor of Casterbridge has a miscarriage and dies, following a seizure induced by the public revelation of her love affair with Michael Henchard.
- In The Brothers Karamazov, published in 1880 by Fyodor Dostoevsky, Stinking Lizaveta dies from childbirth complications.
- In the novella René by François-René de Chateaubriand, the eponymous protagonist's mother dies giving birth to René. This contributes to René's difficult relationship with his estranged father and intense friendship with his sister, and also begins his 'mal du siècle' melancholy which is considered to have defined French Romanticism.

=== 20th century ===
- Catherine Barkley, the nurse and principal supporting character in Ernest Hemingway's A Farewell to Arms, dies in childbirth shortly after her son is stillborn.
- In Bibhutibhushan Bandopadhyay's 1932 Bengali novel Aparajito, Aparna dies giving birth to her son Kajal, after which the despairing father Apu abandons his child. It was later adapted into the film, The World of Apu.
- In Thornton Wilder's play Our Town, Emily Webb dies in childbirth.
- In Vladimir Nabokov's novel The Real Life of Sebastian Knight, Knight's first love, Clare Bishop, later bleeds to death in childbirth "next to an empty cradle".
- The title character dies in childbirth in Nabokov's Lolita, as does Humbert Humbert's first wife.
- In Gabriel García Márquez's novel One Hundred Years of Solitude, Amaranta Ursula Buendía dies while giving birth to Aureliano, the child she has with her nephew Aureliano Babilonia.
- In Barry Hughart's novel The Bridge of Birds, Li Kao's mother dies immediately after giving birth to him. She lives only long enough to ask for Kaoliang wine, which is misinterpreted by those in attendance as naming the child Li Kao.
- In Patricia MacLachlan's Sarah, Plain and Tall, Anna's mother dies a day after Caleb's birth. Afterwards, the two children and their father place an ad in the newspaper for a mail-order bride.
- In Marion Zimmer Bradley's Lady of Avalon, Viviane's mother, Ana, dies while giving birth to her fifth child, Morgause, who is fed and raised by her older sister.
- In Ken Follett's novel The Pillars of the Earth, Tom Builder's wife Agnes dies in childbirth in the woods.
- In the Harry Potter saga, Merope Gaunt-Riddle, the mother of the series' chief antagonist, Lord Voldemort, dies after giving birth to him, living just long enough to name him Tom Marvolo Riddle.
- In Gregory Maguire's novel Wicked, Melena dies giving birth to her third child, Shell.
- In P.D. James' mystery novels, her central detective, Adam Dalgliesh, loses his wife and child in childbirth.
- In Revolutionary Road, the female protagonist dies after inducing a miscarriage.
- In the Star Wars novel Darth Bane: Path of Destruction, Darth Bane's unnamed mother died giving birth to him, and his father Hurst abused him after blaming him for her death.
- In the Redwall book Outcast of Redwall, a ferret named Bluefen dies giving birth to her son Veil Sixclaw, while her husband Swartt Sixclaw left him for dead.
- In Lao She's novel Rickshaw Boy, Tiger girl, the wife of the main character Xiangzi, dies while giving birth, and her child died too.

=== 21st century ===
- In the final book of Lemony Snicket's A Series of Unfortunate Events book series, the character Kit Snicket dies after giving birth to her daughter, the father of whom is never revealed.
- In the 2003 novel The Kite Runner by Khaled Hosseini, the mother of the protagonist Amir dies during his birth.
- In the Nicholas Sparks novel At First Sight, the female protagonist Lexie Darnell dies giving birth to her daughter, Claire.
- In R.A. Salvatore's novel The Highwayman, Sen Wi, realizing that her newborn son will die, uses a healing art to save him at the cost of her own life.
- In George R. R. Martin's series A Song of Ice and Fire, the mother of Tyrion Lannister, Joanna Lannister, dies giving birth to him. He is considered responsible for her death by his father and sister throughout his life. In the series, there is also Daenerys Targaryen, whose mother Queen Rhaella Targaryen died during her birth, and Mance Rayder's wife, Dalla, dies in childbirth as well.
- In George R. R. Martin's novel Fire and Blood, multiple members of the royal family by birth and marriage die in childbirth over successive generations. These include Queen Alyssa Velaryon, mother to King Jaehaerys I, whose eighth and last child is cut alive from her body; Princess Daella Targaryen, eighth child of Jaehaerys I, who dies after giving birth to her only child; and Queen Aemma Arryn, daughter of Daella, who dies after giving birth to her final child by King Viserys I, Prince Baelon Targaryen, who survives his mother by only one day.

== Film ==
=== 20th century ===
- In The Keeper of the Bees, Alice Louise Cameron, portrayed by Clara Bow, dies from childbirth complications.
- In Satyajit Ray's Bengali film, Apur Sansar (The World of Apu) (1959), Apu's wife Aparna dies during childbirth, after which Apu falls into despair and abandons their child Kajal. Years later, Apu eventually acknowledges Kajal as his son and takes responsibility for his upbringing. It is based on the 1932 Bengali novel Aparajito.
- In Purana Mandir, a family line of women dies from childbirth across two centuries.
- In the motion picture The Mask of Zorro (1998), the antagonist Don Rafael Montero, enemy of Zorro, lied that Esperanza de la Vega died in childbirth, but Esperanza de la Vega was actually gunned down instead. Then Montero raised her daughter Elena.
- In the science fiction film Contact (1997), a woman died giving birth to the film's protagonist Eleanor Ann "Ellie" Arroway, portrayed by actress Jodie Foster. Arroway's father died when she was nine years old.
- In Mi Familia/My Familia (1995), the wife of the character played by Jimmy Smits dies while giving birth to their son.
- In the Canadian film The Red Violin (1998), Anna Bussotti dies after a stillbirth in the opening act, leading to the creation of the Red Violin as a tribute.
- In the motion picture Mary Shelley's Frankenstein (1994), Victor Frankenstein's mother dies giving birth to William. She dies of illness in the original novel.
- In the horror film The Seventh Sign (1988), Demi Moore's character dies as a result of giving birth to her child. She offers her soul because "she finds out that the prophecies lead up to the birth of her child who may not survive because there will be no more souls left for the newborns unless someone offers their own."
- In the film adaptation of Interview with the Vampire, the wife of Louis de Pointe du Lac dies in childbirth.
- In the coming-of-age film My Girl (1991), Vada Sultenfuss' mother died a few days after giving birth to her.
- In Fantaghirò, the queen dies after giving birth to the title character of the film series.
- In Disney's 1994 version of The Jungle Book, Mowgli's mother is said to have died giving birth to him, and Mowgli's father Nathoo is later killed by Shere Khan.
- In the supernatural horror film The Craft (1996), Sarah Bailey's mother died while giving birth to her.
- In the Chinese movie To Live (1994), Fengxia, the daughter of the main character Fugui, died while giving birth to her son.
- In City Slickers (1994), a severely weak cow gave birth to a calf that Mitch would claim ownership of and name Norman, and Curly executed her afterwards to put her out of her misery.

=== 21st century ===
- In the film Whale Rider (2002), the main character's mother and twin brother die while she lives.
- In the film Saint Ange (2004), Anna Jurin (Virginie Ledoyen) dies from giving birth to a stillborn child.
- In the film Jersey Girl (2004), Gertrude Steiney, the character of actress Jennifer Lopez, dies during childbirth.
- In the film Star Wars: Episode III – Revenge of the Sith (2005), Padmé Amidala dies after the birth of her twins Luke Skywalker and Leia Organa on Polis Massa, not because of poor health, but because of the complete loss of will to live and a broken heart. Her husband and the father of her children, Anakin Skywalker, turned to the dark side of the Force and became Darth Vader.
- In the film Pan's Labyrinth (2006), Ofelia's mother, Carmen, dies during the birth of her and Captain Vidal's son.
- In the film Babylon A.D. (2008), Aurora died after giving birth to twins that Hugo Toorop ended up taking care of. Aurora was "designed to breed", not to live, so her death after childbirth was preprogrammed.
  - In a scene that is only present in the theatrical cut but was removed from the director's cut, the twins are shown to resemble Aurora and Toorop.
- In the film Sherlock Holmes (2009), Lord Henery Blackwood, the main antagonist's mother, died giving birth to him.
- In the film Kick-Ass (2010), Mindy McCready's mother committed suicide by overdose while pregnant, but the doctors managed to keep her alive long enough for Mindy to be born; in the original comic, this is presented as a false backstory invented by Mindy's father to motivate her.
- In the film Space Between Us (2017), Gardner Eliot, the main protagonist's mother, died during childbirth shortly after landing on Mars.
- In the film Blood Quantum, Joseph's pregnant girlfriend Charlie is bitten by a zombie. After giving birth, she asks Joseph to kill her before she turns into a zombie.
- In the animated film Nahuel and the Magic Book (2020), Consuelo, the protagonist's mother, died by giving birth to the protagonist, Nahuel, in the fishing boat during the middle of a storm with her husband who was headed to the hospital.

== Other media ==
=== Anime, comics, and video games ===
- In the manga and anime series One Piece, Ace's mother Portgas D. Rouge died from exhaustion after giving birth to Ace, due to bearing him for 20 months.
- In the 1980s manga and anime series Kimagure Orange Road, Kyosuke's mother Akemi died shortly after giving birth to his twin sisters Manami and Kurumi.
- In the 1989 manga Berserk, Guts was born from the corpse of his lynched mother underneath a hanging tree, where he was left to die alone in a mire of blood and afterbirth.
- Square Enix's Dragon Quest and Final Fantasy series of video games have mentioned maternal death in several games:
  - In Dragon Quest V (1993), Martha, the mother of the game's protagonist, was rumored to have died in childbirth.
  - In Final Fantasy VI (1994), Gau's mother dies from childbirth, which causes his father to lose his sanity and leave Gau in the Veldt.
  - In the 2007 remake of Final Fantasy IV, Cecil's mother died giving birth to him.
  - In Final Fantasy VIII (1999), Raine died giving birth to protagonist Squall Leonhart.
- In SNK's King of Fighters video game series, the Yagami bloodline is cursed with maternal death. The mothers of the Yagami clan heirs are cursed to die giving birth to the clan heirs.
- In the 1997 manga series Mobile Suit Gundam Wing: Episode Zero, Quatre Raberba Winner's mother Quatrina died giving birth to him.
- In the manga and anime series Naruto, Gaara's mother Karura dies giving birth to him.
- In the 1998 video game Metal Gear Solid, Psycho Mantis' mother died in childbirth, prompting his father to blame him for her death.
- In Key's 2004 visual novel Clannad, Nagisa Furukawa dies of a constant fever while giving birth to Ushio, after which the father Tomoya Okazaki falls into depression and gives his daughter away to Nagisa's parents. Five years later, Tomoya eventually takes responsibility for Ushio's upbringing, but the latter catches her mother's fever and dies as well. However, time is altered to where Nagisa survives giving birth and lives a happier life with her husband and daughter. It was later adapted into a film and anime series.
  - In the film adaptation, Nagisa does not come back to life.
- In the video game Jade Empire, Sky's wife dies giving birth to their daughter, Pinmei, years before he meets the player.
- In the webcomic, Kevin and Kell, Wanda Woolstone dies giving birth to Corrie Dewclaw. Her death causes the otherwise very skilled Ralph Dewclaw, Corrie's father, to lose the will to hunt, and causes him to mistakenly believe that predator-prey relationships inevitably end tragically.
- In the game Fallout 3, the player's mother dies giving birth to him/her.
- In this anime Kiddy Girl-and, Eclipse was Q-Feuille's mother, who died giving birth to her.
- In the 2017 video game What Remains of Edith Finch, the titular character Edith Finch dies from giving birth to Christopher.
- In Marvel Comics, N'Yami, T'Challa's mother, dies as a result of his birth.
- In the video game Fire Emblem: Three Houses, Byleth's mother, Sitri, gave them her Crest Stone to save their life shortly after giving birth to them.
- In the video game Fire Emblem Warriors: Three Hopes, Rodrigue Achille Fraldarius mentions that Dimitri Alexandre Blaiddyd's mother died shortly after his birth.
- In the light novel series High School DxD, Gasper Vladi's human mother died shortly after giving birth to Gasper, who was born as a mass of darkness which accidentally cursed his mother and several servants to death.
- In the anime and manga Yu-Gi-Oh!, Marik Ishtar's mother died after giving birth to him.
- In the comic book series The Boys, Billy Butcher's wife Becky Saunders was raped by Black Noir dressed as the Homelander, and she eventually died giving birth to his son.
- In the manga and anime series Fairy Tail, Rita died giving birth to Makarov Dreyar.
- In the manga and anime series Beastars, it is implied that Toki died due to complications giving birth to Leano, the mother of Legoshi.

=== Live-action television ===
- In the MTV series Teen Wolf, it is revealed that Jackson Whittemore's birth parents, Gordon and Margret Miller, died in a car crash on June 14, 1995, and the doctors kept Margret on life support long enough to deliver Jackson via emergency c-section.
- In an episode of House, a woman 26 weeks pregnant dies after doctors perform an emergency c-section. Another one dies from eclampsia following delivery.
- In the television series Lost, the character Ben Linus' mother died while giving birth to him and his father blames him for it.
- In the series one ER episode "Loves Labours Lost", Mark Greene oversees a patient who dies in childbirth due to pre-eclampsia. Mark is subsequently sued for negligence by her partner.
- In the soap opera spin-off General Hospital: Night Shift, HIV-positive pregnant woman Stacey Sloan dies after complications of placental abruption.
- In Gossip Girl, the anti-hero Chuck Bass' mother allegedly died after giving birth to him.
- In Empresses in the Palace, there are two characters who die after childbirth. Empress Chunyuan dies after giving birth to a stillborn son, but she only appeared in the dialogues of the Emperor's memories. Shen Meizhuang, also known as Consort Hui, dies after giving birth to her daughter Princess Jinghe as well.
- In Mad Men, the protagonist Don Draper's mother died while giving birth to him.
- In Downton Abbey, Lady Sybil Branson dies from eclampsia after giving birth to her daughter Sybil.
- In the Filipino drama, Kadenang Ginto, Jessa Trinidad dies immediately after a vaginal birth.
- In the Australian drama, McLeod's Daughters, Prudence Lachlan dies after giving birth to Adam John McLeod who died with her.
- In the TV show Game of Thrones, it is revealed that Jon Snow's mother, Lyanna Stark, dies from birth complications shortly after giving birth to him.
- In the Netflix series Chilling Adventures of Sabrina, Lady Constance Blackwood dies in childbirth.
- In the sitcom television series The Golden Girls, and its spin-off The Golden Palace, Ingrid Kerklavoner died giving birth to Rose Nylund.
- In the Moon Lovers-Scarlet Heart : Ryeo, Hae Soo dies shortly after giving birth to a baby girl.

== Animated series and films ==
- In Rugrats, Melinda Finster is implied to have died of an unknown illness soon after giving birth to her son Chuckie, as it was mentioned in "Mother's Day" that she was hospitalized and kept a journal, the final entry of which she had written a poem.
- The film Khumba features Lungisa, who died the next day from an illness after giving birth to Khumba.
- In Steven Universe, Steven's mother Rose Quartz died giving birth to him. Her husband Greg Universe, Steven's father, stated that she "gave up her physical form to bring Steven into the world". It is later elaborated that Rose and her son could not exist at the same time, with Steven inheriting her gemstone and abilities.
- In Sofia the First, Princess Amber and Prince James' mother dies after giving birth to them.
- In the Annecy-nominated film Nahuel and the Magic Book (2020), Consuelo, the protagonist's mother, dies after giving birth of Nahuel in a fishing boat during the middle of a storm with her husband, who was heading to the hospital.

== See also ==
- Maternal death
