= The Ancient (disambiguation) =

The Ancient is a novel by R. A. Salvatore. The name may also refer to:

- "The Ancient (poem)", a poem by Mary Gilmore (1917)
- "The Ancient", from Yes's Tales from Topographic Oceans (1973)
- "The Ancient", from Catamenia's Winternight Tragedies (2005)
