= Immortalis =

Immortalis may refer to:

- Immortalis (novel), a novel within The DemonWars Saga, a series of high fantasy novels
- Immortalis, a series of graphics processing units; see Mali (processor)
- Immortalis, a video game formerly published by Aeria Games
