= Matthew Hansen =

Canadian screenwriter, author and editor

Matthew Hansen (born October 19, 1976) is a Canadian screenwriter, author and editor. A former competitive cyclist, Hansen lives in Toronto, Ontario.

His full-time cycling career in 1996. During his active time, he rode for the Canadian Jet Fuel Coffee team from 1999 to 2005.

Hansen began his publishing career as a cycling journalist. Following that, he worked as an editor for Dreamwave Productions, publishers of several comic titles including The Transformers, before moving on to become the Editor in Chief of Marvel Comics/Dabel Brothers Productions.

Hansen adapted R.A. Salvatore's novel The Highwayman through Marvel Comics. Hansen also adapted Ted Dekker's Circle Trilogy of novels into graphic novels.

Hansen wrote the film Zoom, which premiered at the Toronto International Film Festival in 2015. In 2016, Hansen was nominated for a Canadian Screen Award for Zoom, for Best Original Screenplay.
