= The Sundering =

Fictional event from Dungeons & Dragons

- Event logo
- The Companions; The Godborn; The Adversary; The Reaver; The Sentinel; The Herald
- Author: R. A. Salvatore, Paul S. Kemp, Erin Evans, Richard Lee Byers, Troy Denning, Ed Greenwood
- Country: United States
- Language: English
- Genre: Epic fantasy
- Publisher: Wizards of the Coast
- Published: 2013 - 2014
- Media type: Print
- No. of books: 6

The Sundering refers to two events that occurred in the fictional timeline of the Forgotten Realms campaign setting of the Dungeons & Dragons role-playing game. It is also the title of both a series of novels published by Wizards of the Coast and a multimedia project Wizards of the Coast used to transition Dungeons & Dragons from 4th Edition to 5th Edition. This project explored the Second Sundering story and included the aforementioned book series, the free-to-play mobile game Arena of War developed by DeNA and an adventure series for the 4th Edition D&D Encounters program.

== Plot summary ==
The First Sundering occurred in ancient times (around -17,600 DR) before humans came into Toril, at a time when elven high mages united to create the Evermeet lands. As a consequence of their powerful magic, the supercontinent of Merrouroboros was torn apart, creating what is now known as the Trackless Sea and the continents of Faerûn, Maztica and Katashaka, among other physical changes.

The Second Sundering was equally cataclysmic, but occurred in recent times. Beginning in 1484 DR, about one hundred years after the onset of the Spellplague, natural disasters and calamities flashed across the planet Toril. Earthquakes, vast floodings, wars, droughts and volcanic eruptions tore the world apart, and by 1489 DR this Second Sundering had changed the world dramatically, both physically and culturally. The Spellplague had caused huge changes to the planet, but The Second Sundering reversed most of them.

=== The Companions ===
At the end of The Last Threshold, Drizzt Do'Urden is left mortally wounded and The Companions continues that story. The Companions of the Hall are reincarnated by the power of Mielikki in order to save Drizzt. However, Catti-brie, Regis, Bruenor Battlehammer, and Wulfgar must first live through 21 years of their new lives before they can attempt to save Drizzt. The book follows these characters through their new lives, their rediscovery of each other and their eventual coming together to save Drizzt in 1484 DR. While the Sundering story continues in The Godborn, the next series that follows these characters is the Companions Codex.

=== The Godborn ===
The Godborn acts as a sequel to The Twilight War trilogy by Paul S. Kemp. The books follows Vasen, son of Erevis Cale, who was born 70 years in the future after his mother was sent forward in time by Mask, the god of shadows and thieves. Erevis was a Chosen of Mask who had previously carried part of the god's divine essence. However, Vasen is raised under the faith of Amaunator, god of sun and law, and serves as a paladin. In 1484 DR, Vasen is discovered by companions of his father's and pulled into their conflict with Mephistopheles, an archdevil of the Nine Hells. Vasen and his companions rescue Erevis from Cania, the eighth layer of the Nine Hells, where Mephistopheles had imprisoned him. Vasen and Erevis then work together to stop Shar, goddess of darkness, from destroying the world by preventing the Cycle of Night. They succeed when Vasen uses the power of Amaunator to strip several characters (Rivalen, Riven and Mephistopheles) of Mask's divine essence with the expectation that Erevis would take on this power of godhood. Afterwards, Riven convinces Erevis that it would be better for him to take on the power instead so Riven is then reborn as Mask.

=== The Adversary ===
The Adversary by Erin M. Evans is both the third novel of the Sundering series and the third novel of the Brimstone Angels series. In 1479 DR, as a result of a deal the tiefling warlock Farideh made with the cambion Sairché, Farideh and her twin sister Havilar were placed into a magical stasis on Malbolge (the sixth layer of the Nine Hells) for seven and a half years. In 1486 DR, Farideh and Havilar are sent back to Toril — to uphold the deal she made, Farideh infiltrates a Netheril internment camp on the Lost Peaks. Once inside the camp, Farideh is forced to use her unique powers to identify which people, who are trapped in the village that surrounds the camp, are Chosen of the gods. The Netherese plan is to gather the divine sparks of the Chosen and transfer them to Shar, however, Asmodeus wants to interfere and capture the sparks for himself. Meanwhile, Havilar ends up allied with a group of Harpers and works with them to liberate the camp. As Farideh and her new companion Dahl (also of the Harpers) try to escape, Havilar arrives with her companions to help liberate the prisoners before the camp is destroyed by Thayan forces. Throughout the Sundering, Farideh and Havilar develop powers as Chosen of Asmodeus — this is what allows Farideh to identity the Chosen of other gods. What they did not realize is that these powers were actually meant for their ancestor Bryseis Kakistos, as payment for Kakistos's assistance in Asmodeus's ascension to godhood. While the Sundering story continues in The Reaver, the next book that follows these characters is Fire in the Blood.

== Publication history ==
The First Sundering was mentioned in Lost Empires of Faerûn (2005) and The Grand History of the Realms (2007), and again in Forgotten Realms Campaign Guide (2008). The first two books are supplements written for D&D v3.5 and the later book is the official Forgotten Realms Campaign Guide for D&D 4th Edition.

The Second Sundering was first announced at Gen Con 2012 in anticipation of the upcoming version of the game, known at the time as D&D Next. Wizards of the Coast described it as a "cataclysm", and campaign setting creator Ed Greenwood further elaborated on the event as "war, gods, and plain folks trying to get by". At Gen Con 2013, Wizards of the Coast announced additional details of the Sundering event: six Forgotten Realms novels, an official adventure series for the 4th Edition D&D Encounters program with a corresponding social network app called "The Sundering Adventurer's Chronicle" developed by Crown Social, the free-to-play mobile game Arena of War developed by DeNA, a comic book series titled Thieves of Calimport, and a line of miniatures depicting characters from the event. The first novel, The Companions (2013) by R.A. Salvatore, was released the week before Gen Con 2013. Subsequent novels about the Second Sundering (just referred to as the Sundering) were published between 2013 and 2014, and became known as the Sundering series. The novels and adventures were released in a staggered, overlapping fashion and the adventures included the rules for the public D&D Next playtest. However, the announced comic book series was never released.

During Gen Con 2013, the public 5th Edition playtest was in full swing and saw the release of three Sundering themed adventures. Ghosts of Dragonspear Castle (2013) was the big public release adventure since it included the 5th Edition playtest rules followed by the Murder in Baldur’s Gate (2013), the adventure for the 15th season of the 4th Edition D&D Encounters program, which became available for purchase shortly after the convention. While the third tie-in adventure, Confrontation at Candlekeep (2013), acted as a prequel to the sixth novel The Herald (2014), it did not become well known because it was originally only released to Dungeon Masters participating in the RPGA convention playthrough. Wizards of the Coast "reserved much of Hall D at the Indiana Convention Center so that the RPGA could run Confrontation at Candlekeep. [...] The two-hour adventure was scheduled for 28 separate sessions, the first running from 8am to 10am on Thursday, August 15th and the last running from 2pm to 4pm on Sunday, August 18th. Each session could seat up to 176 players, which meant that Wizards had the capability to run almost 5,000 players through the D&D 5e adventure — enough to generate a great seed of interest when those players brought word of the new edition home to their own gaming groups". Confrontation at Candlekeep was then available at Pax Prime 2013 in a similar format and at a limited number of game stores as an event after the two conventions. The adventure only became available to the general public in October 2015.

The first adventure labeled as part of the Sundering adventure series, Murder in Baldur’s Gate, was also the first big change to the 4th Edition D&D Encounters program. Previously, Encounters seasons had distributed a limited amount of books for free. This new season allowed anyone to purchase the product which included 12 weeks of planned content. "The adventure itself was system-neutral, but Wizards included stats for D&D 3.5e, 4e, and 5e in the 'Monster Statistics' book. [...] This move toward 5e saw one other big change in the Encounters program: it was the first Encounters program that was largely gridless, moving away from the extensive tactical maps that had defined the earlier seasons of Encounters play".

The second Sundering adventure, Legacy of the Crystal Shard, is set in 1485 DR and ran concurrently with The Adversary (2013), the third novel of the Sundering. While Murder in Baldur’s Gate continued the style of weekly content in the Encounter program, Legacy of the Crystal Shard "totally broke away from Encounters' traditional style of play. There are no encounters; instead GMs are told to break up the adventure as they see fit over the ten weeks of play. The style of adventure is also quite different. [...] Part of this is done through its inclusion of three different power brokers who are advancing evil agendas. Depending on which villains the players oppose, they might have to fight, politic, or roleplay". The third and fourth Sundering adventures, Dreams of the Red Wizards: Scourge of the Sword Coast and Dead in Thay, continued "the revamping of the D&D Encounters program". Both of these adventures were exclusively released in PDF form rather than as a physical product. While these adventures referenced the events of Ghosts of Dragonspear Castle as setup for their adventure story, the connection to specific events of the Sundering storyline were not explicit.

Dead in Thay also included two specific changes for the D&D Encounter program. First, it reintroduced the weekly encounter style that was removed in Legacy of the Crystal Shard by adding "specific encounters for the first and last week and confined plays to individual zones of a dungeon during each other week of play". Second, Dead in Thay added the Event Coordinator role which had previously been limited to convention adventures such as Vault of the Dracolich (2013). "The Event Coordinator managed the interactions of multiple groups of players, all playing the same adventure. In Dead in Thay they might directly interact during the first and last weeks of play, but as they adventured through the dungeon, they could also change its state for subsequent parties. [...] It allowed multiple groups in a game store to all interact in a meaningful way, really taking advantage of the environment that the Encounters programs was played in". Dead in Thay was designed for 6th to 8th level characters and was one of the few high level D&D Encounters adventures. An updated version of the adventure was published in the 5th Edition adventure anthology Tales from the Yawning Portal (2017).

The result of The Second Sundering, in game terms, was the transition from 4th Edition rules to 5th Edition rules of Dungeons & Dragons, published in 2014. Liz Schuh, Head of Publishing and Licensing for Dungeons & Dragons, said:

The Sundering is the last of a series of ground-shaking events. It really affects the whole world of the Forgotten Realms in a major way. You may remember when the Spell Plagues began, the two worlds of the Forgotten Realms, Abeir and Toril, crashed together. That created both geographic changes (the map of the Forgotten Realms and Faerun actually changed due to that collision), and also changed the way magic works. It changed the pantheon of the gods. The Sundering is all about those two worlds separating—coming apart—and the process of that separation is really the story that we’re telling over the next year. At the end of this story arc, Abeir and Toril will be separate again, and many of the things that happened when they crashed together will go back to the way they were before. So magic will be much like it was before the Spell Plague. Markings that marked spell-plagued people and animals will fade and go away. It’s really about moving the Forgotten Realms forward, but also about bringing it around to the most beloved and most fondly remembered Forgotten Realms.

The 5th Edition campaign guide Sword Coast Adventurer's Guide (2015) describes the events of the First Sundering, the Spellplague, and the Second Sundering (the 2013 Sundering event) and the consequences of these events in game terms and lore. The term "Sundering" is now used indiscriminately to refer to either the original First Sundering or Second Sundering, when used in official game materials.

== Reception ==
Curtis D. Carbonell, in the book Dread Trident: Tabletop Role-Playing Games and the Modern Fantastic, highlighted that the Sundering event used the transition to 5th edition to undo changes 4th edition brought to the Forgotten Realms. He wrote: "A new sundering was needed to return FR to its pre-Spellplague state. Such complexities are often beyond the interest of many players, but those who choose to unravel them face a historiography and an archive-building challenge of great magnitude. The latest articulation of FR, though, provides a workable solution because it has adjusted itself through the editions, enough so that even 4e can be situated into the multiverse".

=== Novels ===
Jules-Pierre Malartre, for Den of Geek, wrote "I don’t think I’ve enjoyed reading a collaborative writers series as much since Thieves World, decades ago".

The Companions, the first book in The Sundering series, by R.A. Salvatore was nominated for the 2013 Goodreads Choice Awards Best Fantasy. The book was on the USA Today Best-Selling Books list for 1 week, with #68 as its best week. Kelly Jensen, for SF Crowsnest, wrote that the book "is utterly absorbing, surprising and wonderful. I have never read anything like it and I’ve been reading R.A. Salvatore’s books for years. There are stories within the story, threads of past and future. The book can be taken as both a beginning and an ending. It’s an ode to Drizzt and the bond of friendship, honour and loyalty. [...] ‘The Companions’ is everything a fan of Salvatore and the Legend of Drizzt could hope for and more".

The Adversary, the third book in The Sundering series, was included in the December 2013 Bookseller's Picks for Tor by Barnes & Noble buyer Jim Killen. The Kobold Press review highlighted Evans’ ability to convey interpersonal relationships. Since the book is the third book of the Brimstone Angels series, the review states "Evans does a good job of filling the reader in as the story progresses, but without that prior knowledge, the reader will be lost and possibly feel a bit overwhelmed. To top that off, the book jumps around quite a bit between the past and present, inside the keep and internment camp, and even within the Nine Hells. In Evans’ defense, she handles this well and includes dates and locations at the beginnings of each chapter—to really follow the action, I recommend paying attention to these. [...] This book is a must for Evans fans as well as fans of the Realms, but the cost of admission is reading the Brimstone Angels series if you really want to get the most out of this book". In contrast, Kelly Jensen, for SF Crowsnest, wrote "Evans does a fantastic job of catching up the casual reader. Being familiar with her characters would make ‘The Adversary’ more compelling…maybe. Having being [sic] introduced at the beginning of this book, I found the journey of all the characters very satisfying. [...] What impresses me the most is the author’s confidence in shifting events on Toril, messing with the grand order, while advancing her own story arc".

The Sundering Saga appeared on the 2025 Screen Rant "10 Best Forgotten Realms Book Series, Ranked" list at #10.

=== Adventures ===
Alex Lucard, for Diehard GameFAN, wrote negatively on Ghosts of Dragonspear Castle release as a convention exclusive. He commented that the adventure "is pretty well done. It’s not great, and as the first physical beta test of D&D Next I’m pretty happy with it and would happily recommend it to everyone at the MSRP on the cover. [...] Wizards could have made so much more money by making this publicly available while also making D&D fans everywhere happy by letting them have unfettered access to this release and keeping the secondary market gougers from making a mint off the people who really love and care about the game but couldn’t go to a four day convention for whatever reason. At least the contents of Ghosts of Dragonspear Castle will keep you and your gaming troupe busy for months as you play through the adventures, read through the weighty tome and get a real sense of where Wizards of the Coast is heading with D&D Next".

Lucard, for Diehard GameFAN, highlighted the physical pieces of the first official adventure, Murder in Baldur’s Gate, including a "a sixty-four page Campaign Guide which gives an incredibly in-depth look at Baldur’s Gate, the people who live there and nearby locations" and "a sturdy and glossy four piece DM screen". Lucard wrote "definitely consider Murder in Baldur’s Gate a must buy for any D&D fan, regardless of edition wars". Shannon Appelcline, author of Designers & Dragons, highlighted that it was the first time Baldur's Gate was "the main setting of a tabletop adventure". Appelcline commented that by selling the adventure instead of releasing a limited number of books for free "it gave D&D some much needed attention on gaming store shelves during a year where Wizards' schedule was otherwise filled with reprints of classic rule books and adventures. Second, it allowed Wizards to produce a much more comprehensive supplement".

Lucard's review, for Diehard GameFAN, of the second adventure, Legacy of the Crystal Shard, highlighted again the physical pieces included in the adventure such as the DM screen, the 31 page adventure and the 63 page campaign guide to Icewind Dale and called it "an amazing collection". Lucard wrote "like the first Sundering adventure, the best part of Legacy of the Crystal Shard is by far the campaign guide. These campaign guides have been some of the best offering from Wizards in the past two editions and they are by far the most comprehensive pieces in the history of Dungeons & Dragons for the locations they cover. [...] I know the package says adventure on the cover and in the description, but it’s actually a full campaign, similar to how Murder in Baldur’s Gate was actually comprised of ten adventures. It will take you roughly a dozen sessions to play out Legacy of the Crystal Shard to its end".

On the third adventure, Scourge of the Sword Cost, Lucard wrote: "while it’s not as good as Ghosts of Dragonspear Castle, Murder in Baldur’s Gate or Legacy of the Crystal Shard, the campaign is better than any of the D&D Encounters pieces I’ve gone through in the past few years and it’s definitely a better experience than most published fourth edition adventures". Lucard commented that, unlike the first two adventures, Scourge of the Sword Cost was a pdf only product and was not system neutral. Lucard highlighted that the adventure "comes with a whopping 220 pages of various PDFs provided all the rules you will need to play D&D Next".

On the fourth adventure, Dead In Thay, Lucard wrote: "Unfortunately for the adventure side of the Sundering event, each adventure has been a step down (or more) from the previous one. [...] Unfortunately, Dead in Thay not only continues this downward spiral. But the end result is a chaotic mess that is little more than a pure hack and slash experience [...] and because the adventure is designed for multiple parties and DMs, Dead In Thay becomes a very hard piece to even be able to play in the first place much less pull it off in a way that it will be enjoyable to all who participate".

== List of related products ==
The Second Sundering is composed of the following:

Title	Creator(s)	Type	Date	ISBN
The Companions	R. A. Salvatore	Novel	August 6, 2013	978-0786963713
The Godborn	Paul S. Kemp	Novel	October 1, 2013	978-0786963737
The Adversary	Erin Evans	Novel	December 3, 2013	978-0786963751
The Reaver	Richard Lee Byers	Novel	February 4, 2014	978-0786965427
The Sentinel	Troy Denning	Novel	April 1, 2014	978-0786964598
The Herald	Ed Greenwood	Novel	June 3, 2014	978-0786964604
Arena of War	DeNA	Free-to-play mobile game	August 2013	N/A
Ghosts of Dragonspear Castle	Greg Bilsland, Bruce R. Cordell, Jeremy Crawford	Adventure	August 15, 2013	978-0786965311
Confrontation at Candlekeep	Teos Abadia, Greg Bilsland, Shawn Merwin	Adventure	August 15, 2013	N/A
Sundering Adventure I: Murder in Baldur's Gate	Greg Bilsland, Matthew Sernett, Steve Winter	Adventure	August 15, 2013	978-0786964635
Sundering Adventure II: Legacy of the Crystal Shard	R.A. Salvatore with Jeffrey Ludwig, James Wyatt, and Matthew Sernett	Adventure	November 2013	978-0786964642
Sundering Adventure III: Dreams of the Red Wizards: Scourge of the Sword Coast	Tito Leati, Matt Sernett, and Chris Sims	Adventure	February 2014	N/A
Sundering Adventure IV: Dreams of the Red Wizards: Dead in Thay	Scott Fitzgerald Gray	Adventure	April 2014	N/A
