= Mortalis =

2001 novel by R.A. Salvatore

- Author: R.A. Salvatore
- Cover artist: Alan Pollock
- Language: English
- Series: The DemonWars Saga
- Genre: Fantasy
- Publisher: Del Rey
- Publication date: April 3, 2001
- Publication place: United States
- Pages: 576
- ISBN: 0-345-43039-5
- OCLC: 44086039
- Dewey Decimal: 813/.54 21
- LC Class: PS3569.A462345 M67 2000
- Preceded by: The Demon Apostle
- Followed by: Ascendance

Mortalis is a fantasy novel by American writer R. A. Salvatore. Spanning the gap between the first and second DemonWars Saga trilogies, it is also the fourth out of seven books in the combined DemonWars Saga.

== Plot summary ==
Mortalis tells of Pony's life after the war: her fight against the crushing grief of her husband Elbryan's death and her fight to stop a plague infecting the people of the kingdom. At the same time, the characters of Aydrian Wyndon, Elbryan's and Pony's child, and Brynn Dharielle, a To-Gai girl turned ranger, are introduced to the story.

== Background ==
This book was written while the author's older brother and closest friend, Gary, was dying of pancreatic cancer. He finally passed within months of the publishing of this book in 2000. He considers this book his finest work in large part to the grieving process he suffered through which mirrored a similar aspect of the book in which the previous hero of the story, Elbryan Wyndon, is killed.
