= The Dragon King =

(The) Dragon King may refer to:

- Dragon King, a deity in Chinese mythology commonly regarded as the divine ruler of the ocean
- The Dragon King (novel), a novel in the Crimson shadow series
- The Dragon King (Decide Your Destiny), a Doctor Who gamebook
- The Dragon King (TV series), an upcoming spin-off series to the animated fantasy television series The Dragon Prince (2018–2024)
- Dark Kingdom: The Dragon King, a fantasy mini-series
- Druk Gyalpo, title of the King of Bhutan
- Bahamut (Dungeons & Dragons), King of Dragons in Pathfinder / Dungeons and Dragons
- Onaga, also called the Dragon King, from the Mortal Kombat series

== See also ==
- Dragon Kings (disambiguation)
