= Bedwyr (given name) =

Bedwyr is the Welsh name for Bedivere, a character in the Arthurian legend. Notable people with the given name include:

- Bedwyr Lewis Jones (1933–1992), Welsh scholar, literary critic and linguist
- Bedwyr Williams (born 1974), Welsh artist

== See also ==
- The Sword of Bedwyr (1994), the first book in the Crimson Shadow series of fantasy novels by R. A. Salvatore
