= Earth magic =

Earth magic may refer to:

- Earth Magic, a 1978 book about megaliths by Francis Hitching
- Earth Magic, a 1978 novel by Alexei Panshin and his wife Cory
- Earth magic (Corona fictional world), a form of magic in R. A. Salvatore's fictional world, Corona
- Earth magic (Hollows series), a form of magic in Kim Harrison's works
- Earth magic, a form of magic in Terry Brooks' 1993 novel, The Talismans of Shannara

== See also ==
- Heaven and Earth Magic, a 1962 animated film by Harry Everett Smith
- Chthonic deities, in Greek mythology, gods or spirits who inhabited the underworld or existed in or under the earth
- Earth (classical element)
- Earth religion, a system of religion based on the veneration of natural phenomena
- Geomancy (lit. 'earth divination'), any method of divination or spiritual practice related to the Earth
- Goetia (magic), a type of European sorcery or witchcraft encompassing divination, spells, and magical spirits
