= Dragon Kings (disambiguation) =

Dragon Kings or dragon kings may refer to:

- Druk Gyalpo, meaning "Dragon King", the official title of the head of state of Bhutan
- Dragon Kings of the Four Seas, oceanic rulers in Chinese mythology
- The eight hachidai ryuuou of the Lotus Sutra
- Dragon Kings (Dark Sun), a 1992 accessory book for a role-playing game
- Dragon King Theory in systems theory
- Ryūō, (竜王, lit. "Dragon King"), an annual Japanese professional shogi tournament and the title of its winner.

== See also ==
- The Dragon King (disambiguation)
