= The Demon Apostle =

2000 novel by R. A. Salvatore

- Author: R. A. Salvatore
- Cover artist: Alan Pollock
- Language: English
- Series: The DemonWars Saga
- Genre: Fantasy
- Publisher: Del Rey
- Publication date: April 4, 2000
- Publication place: United States
- Pages: 544
- ISBN: 0-345-39153-5
- OCLC: 40150654
- Dewey Decimal: 813/.54 21
- LC Class: PS3569.A462345 D45 1999
- Preceded by: The Demon Spirit
- Followed by: Mortalis

The Demon Apostle a 2000 fantasy novel by R. A. Salvatore. It is the third book in the first DemonWars Saga trilogy. The book is also the third out of seven books in the combined DemonWars Saga.

== Plot summary ==
The final novel in the first trilogy begins with the mopping up of Bestesbulzibar's army and the battle against the demon's spirit, which has possessed the highest levels of power within the Abellican Church. Again, it is up to Elbryan and Pony, along with their friends, to combat the corruption and attempt to end its terrible hold forever.
