= The Cleric Quintet =

Novel series by R. A. Salvatore

The Cleric Quintet Collector's Edition cover

The Cleric Quintet is a series of five fantasy novels by American writer R. A. Salvatore, set in the Forgotten Realms campaign setting of the Dungeons & Dragons fantasy role-playing game. They follow the story of Cadderly Bonaduce, a scholar-cleric, as he attempts to stop the "Chaos Curse" unleashed upon the world. It is also a spiritual journey for Cadderly, where he begins to see things in a new light and becomes closer to his god.

Recurring characters in this series include Cadderly Bonaduce, Danica Maupoissant, the dwarven brothers Ivan and Pikel Bouldershoulder, and Shayleigh, an elf maiden of Shilmista Forest.

== Novels ==
Title	Fictional date	Original publishing	Current publisher
Canticle	1361 DR	October 1991	Wizards of the Coast
In Sylvan Shadows	1361 DR	April 1992	Wizards of the Coast
Night Masks	1361 DR	August 1992	Wizards of the Coast
The Fallen Fortress	1361–1362 DR	June 1993	Wizards of the Coast
The Chaos Curse	1362 DR	June 1994	Wizards of the Coast

== Plot summary ==
The evil wizard Aballister has spent two years collecting and brewing a potion of power, as told to him by the imp, Druzil, sent by the Goddess of Poison, Talona. When he reveals it to his evil fellowship at the hidden stronghold Castle Trinity, the priest Barjin takes control of it and sets off to the major stronghold of the Snowflake Mountains — the Edificant Library. He finds an innocent, intelligent, and young, low-ranking priest, to open the potion, the Chaos Curse, which makes all who breathe it lose self-control. Cadderly must fight a memory-blocking spell in order to lift the curse and save the Library.

== Creation ==
The character of Cadderly was created specially for the Cleric Quintet, after six Drizzt books were completed – as Salvatore wrote in his introduction, "We were done with Drizzt. Or at least, we thought we were". The new protagonist was originally planned to be a monk, but it got rejected due to changes in Dungeons & Dragons 2nd Edition, where the class of monks was absent. Mary Kirchoff proposed that the protagonist should be a cleric. Salvatore invented a concept of spiritual journey for his character, who initially treats his religion as just a lifestyle, but gradually becomes more tied to his god, Deneir.

== Reception ==
The Cleric Quintet appeared on the 2024 Game Rant "31 Best Dungeons & Dragons Novels, Ranked" list at #24.

The Cleric's Quintet appeared on the 2025 Screen Rant "10 Best Forgotten Realms Book Series, Ranked" list at #4.

== Reviews ==
- Science Fiction Chronicle
