= Chronicles of Ynis Aielle =

R.A. Salvatore fantasy trilogy of novels

Chronicles of Ynis Aielle is a fantasy trilogy by American author R. A. Salvatore, published between 1990 and 2000. It comprises Echoes of the Fourth Magic (1990), The Witch's Daughter (1991), and Bastion of Darkness (2000).

The first of the trilogy was the first manuscript that R. A. Salvatore submitted to publishers, although not his first to be published. He started writing it in 1982 and completed it in 1987. He created the setting of Ynis Aielle for the novel, which he wrote in longhand by candlelight.

== Echoes of the Fourth Magic ==
The first book of the trilogy opens in science-fiction style. The research submarine Unicorn is caught in a storm while passing through the Bermuda Triangle. It drifts through time and arrives in a post-apocalyptic future, which resembles a fantasy world. After a nuclear war has wiped out humanity, a magical utopia populated by elves has arisen on the Isle of Hope, Ynis Aielle. The island's peace is threatened by a sinister master of the mystical arts who has embraced the forbidden third magic, the most deadly sorcery of all.

Captain Mitchell, Doc Brady, Billy Shank, Reinheiser, and Jeffry "Del" DelGiudice of the Unicorn find themselves regarded as the ancient ones of prophecy, destined to change the world, and ally themselves with Brielle, the Emerald Witch of the Woods, and Ardaz, the Silver Mage.

== The Witch's Daughter ==
The Witch's Daughter is set 20 years after the conclusion of Echoes of the Fourth Magic. The new characters include Del's and Brielle's daughter, Rhiannon, and the half-elf Bryan of Corning.

With the revival of the Black Warlock, the enchanted peace of Ynis Aielle is once more threatened. Rhiannon must learn to deal with her own frightening new powers in order to defeat him.

== Bastion of Darkness ==
The third book, published almost a decade after the second, echoes earlier themes. Morgan Thalasi, the Black Warlock, returns with even greater power than before: with the Staff of Death, he can raise an unstoppable army of the dead. His dark wraith general, the former Hollis Mitchell, captures Rhiannon, the daughter of the Emerald Witch. To defeat him, a mixed company sets out for Talas-dun, to retrieve a mysterious treasure guarded by a dragon.
