= The Demon Spirit =

1999 novel by R.A. Salvatore

- Author: R.A. Salvatore
- Cover artist: Alan Pollock
- Language: English
- Series: The DemonWars Saga
- Genre: Fantasy
- Publisher: Del Rey
- Publication date: January 30, 1999
- Publication place: United States
- Pages: 544
- ISBN: 0-345-39152-7
- OCLC: 40732362
- Preceded by: The Demon Awakens
- Followed by: The Demon Apostle

The Demon Spirit is a fantasy novel by American writer R. A. Salvatore, the second book in the first DemonWars Saga trilogy. It is also the second of seven books in the combined DemonWars Saga.

== Plot summary ==
Even with the destruction of the dactyl, all is not well in the kingdom of Honce-the-Bear. The servants of Bestesbulzibar still roam the land, creating havoc while, at St.-Mere-Abelle, the centaur Bradwarden is held captive. It is up to Elbryan and Pony, with help from friends, to attempt a rescue while fighting the enemy. It is during this time that Elbryan teaches Pony Bi'nelle dasada, the sword-dance of the Touel'alfar, the short-winged elves of Corona. It is also at this time that Father Abbot Markwart, head of the Church of St. Abelle, begins his spiral downward. In this novel, the reader meets Andacanavar, a northern ranger from Alpinador. Also, the character of Marcalo De'Unnero becomes more fully developed.
