= The Ancient =

2008 novel by R. A. Salvatore

- Author: R. A. Salvatore
- Language: English
- Series: Corona
- Genre: Fantasy
- Publisher: CDS Books
- Publication date: 2008
- Publication place: United States
- Pages: 384 (hardcover)

The Ancient is a 2008 fantasy novel by R. A. Salvatore. The setting is Salvatore's world of Corona, The Ancient is the sequel to The Highwayman. It is about a crippled man named Bransen Garibond, also known as the Highwayman. After being kicked out of Pryd Holding, Bransen is searching for his long-lost father, traveling with his wife Cadayle, and her mother Callen.

He gets tricked into fighting a war against the Samhaist leader, Ancient Badden. On a lake just below Badden's Magical Ice Castle, there are societies in the middle of their own conflicts, unaware of Badden's plan to destroy them. Bransen becomes the only person able to save all of the lake's inhabitants and stop all of northern Honce from being under Badden's Control.

== Publication history ==
- Salvatore, R. A. (2008). The Ancient: A Novel of Corona. CDS Books.
