= Stone of Tymora =

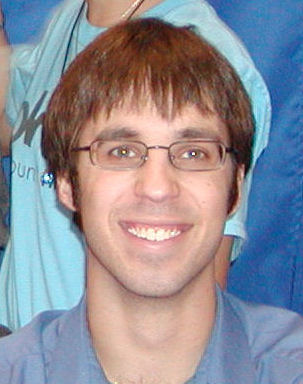
Geno Salvatore at book signing

Stone of Tymora is a series of fantasy novels for teens written by scifi and fantasy author R. A. Salvatore and his son, Geno Salvatore. The series is R. A. Salvatore's first collaboration with his son, and features Salvatore's drow character Drizzt Do'Urden. The first book in the series is The Stowaway. It was released in October 2008.

== Stowaway ==
=== Plot ===
Barely a teen and already guarding a secret that could jeopardize his young life, Maimun is marked for death. With the help of a mysterious stranger, the boy escapes his village and flees out to sea, stowing away on the pirate hunting ship, Sea Sprite, where he comes across a most unlikely ally: the dark elf Drizzt Do'Urden. With a half-demon determined to destroy him, and a crew of sailors resentful of the trouble he's caused, Maimun must find the courage to prove his worth, both to his friends and to himself.

=== Reception ===
Science Letter gave the novel a positive review, writing, "The Stowaway features all the suspense, action, and compelling characters that Salvatore fans have come to expect."

Kirkus Reviews states "Light on explicit violence, gore or death despite plenty of opportunities for all three, this makes sturdy fare for younger fans of D&D or sword-and-sorcery fantasy in general."

== Notes ==
- The character of Maimun is featured in Salvatore's novel The Pirate King, released the same year as Stowaway.
