= Fictional universe =

Self-consistent fictional setting

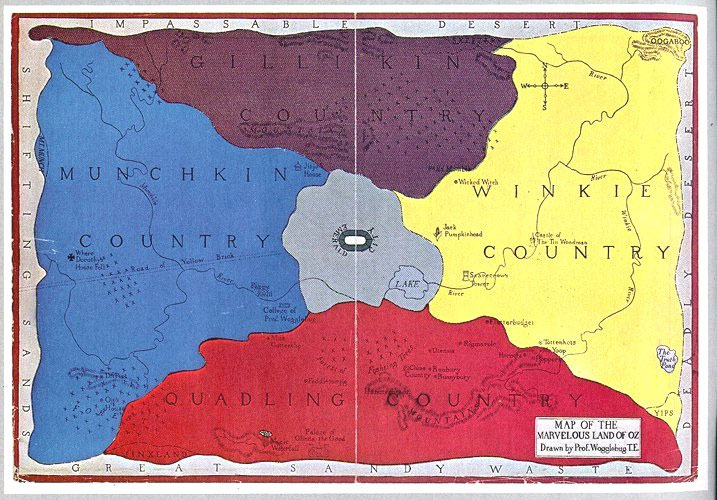
Map of the Land of Oz, the fictional realm that is the setting for L. Frank Baum's Oz series

A fictional universe, also known as an imagined universe, constructed universe, or diegetic world, is the internally consistent fictional setting used in a narrative or a work of art. This concept is most commonly associated with works of fantasy and science fiction, and can be found in various forms such as novels, comics, films, television shows, video games, and other creative works.

In science fiction, a fictional universe may be a remote alien planet or galaxy with little apparent relationship to the real world (as in the Star Wars universe). In fantasy, it may be a greatly fictionalized or invented version of Earth's distant past or future (as in The Lord of the Rings).

== Fictional continuity ==
In a 1970 article in CAPA-alpha, comics historian Don Markstein defined the fictional universe as meant to clarify the concept of fictional continuities. According to the criteria he imagined:

1. If characters A and B have met, then they are in the same universe; if characters B and C have met, then, transitively, A and C are in the same universe.
2. Characters cannot be connected by real people—otherwise, it could be argued that Superman and the Fantastic Four were in the same universe, as Superman met John F. Kennedy, Kennedy met Neil Armstrong, and Armstrong met the Fantastic Four.
3. Characters cannot be connected by characters "that do not originate with the publisher"—otherwise it could be argued that Superman and the Fantastic Four were in the same universe, as both met Hercules.
4. Specific fictionalized versions of real people—for instance, the version of Jerry Lewis from DC Comics' The Adventures of Jerry Lewis, who was distinct from the real Jerry Lewis in that he had a housekeeper with magical powers— can be used as connections; this also applies to specific versions of public-domain fictional characters, such as Marvel Comics' version of Hercules or DC Comics' version of Robin Hood.
5. Characters are only considered to have met if they appeared together in a story; therefore, characters who simply appeared on the same front cover are not necessarily in the same universe.

== Collaboration ==
Fictional universes are sometimes shared by multiple prose authors, with each author's works in that universe being granted approximately equal canonical status. For example, Larry Niven's fictional universe Known Space has an approximately 135-year period in which Niven allows other authors to write stories about the Man-Kzin Wars. Other fictional universes, like the Ring of Fire series, actively court canonical stimulus from fans, but gate and control the changes through a formalized process and the final say of the editor and universe creator.

== See also ==
- Alternate history
- Alternate universe
- Campaign setting
- Continuity
- Diegesis
- Expanded universe
- Shared universe
- Fantasy world
- Fictional country
- Fictional location
- Future history
- Lists of fictional locations
- List of fantasy worlds
- Mythical place
- Paracosm
- Parallel universe
- Planets in science fiction
- Roman-fleuve
- Setting
- Simulated reality
- Virtual reality
- Worldbuilding
- Multiverse
