= The Demon Awakens =

1998 novel by R.A. Salvatore

- Cover
- Author: R.A. Salvatore
- Cover artist: Alan Pollock
- Language: English
- Series: The Demon Wars Saga
- Genre: Fantasy
- Publisher: Del Rey
- Publication date: February 28, 1998
- Publication place: United States
- Pages: 624
- ISBN: 0-345-39149-7
- OCLC: 35885984
- Dewey Decimal: 813/.54 21
- LC Class: PS3569.A462345 D46 1997
- Followed by: The Demon Spirit

The Demon Awakens is a fantasy novel by American writer R.A. Salvatore, the first book in the first Demon Wars Saga trilogy. It is also the first out of seven books in the combined Demon Wars Saga.

== Plot summary ==
Elbryan Wyndon and his childhood friend Jilseponie Ault (nicknamed Pony), whose lives are irrevocably changed by the destruction of their home town Dundalis, and Avelyn Desbris who is a very religious man that enters a group of monks that go to a monastery by the name of St. Mere Abelle to study and serve under God. While Elbryan and Pony try to sort out their lives, Avelyn comes to terms with the all-too human brothers of the church and the myriad of injustices he watches them cause. After the destruction of Elbryan's home town, he is taken in by the Touel'alfar and to their home Andur'Blough Inninnes (The Forest of Cloud) and teaches him to not just train his body, but also his mind in the ways of philosophy to become a formidable ranger. While Elbryan is training his childhood friend Pony cannot remember her past and is trying to ease the pain of her forgotten past. While all this is happening Avelyn has problems of his own and soon has to leave the church in a most unexpected way. It is not until years later when they all meet each other and fight an evil by the name of Bestesbulzibar who is a mighty demon that was reawakened by the humans weakness to rule all the realm with an army of goblins, "powries" (dwarfs), and Fomorian Giants and not only that the church is after Avelyn, too. So now this ragtag group of friends, with the help of some unlikely allies, must stop the demon and save the entire realm from its impending doom.

== Reception ==
Reviews:

- Hamburger S. The Demon Awakens. Library Journal. 1997;122(7):124. Accessed May 29, 2025. https://search.ebscohost.com/login.aspx?direct=true&db=lkh&AN=9704272669&lang=ru&site=eds-live&scope=site
- Steinberg SS, Zaleski J. Forecasts: Fiction. Publishers Weekly. 1997;244(17):55. Accessed May 29, 2025. https://search.ebscohost.com/login.aspx?direct=true&db=lkh&AN=9705091192&lang=ru&site=eds-live&scope=site
