= Ascendance (novel) =

2001 novel by R. A. Salvatore

- Author: R. A. Salvatore
- Illustrator: Laura Maestro
- Language: English
- Series: The Second Demonwars Saga
- Genre: Fantasy
- Publisher: The Random House Publishing Group
- Publication date: May 2001
- Media type: Hardcover, Paperback, Kindle, audio
- ISBN: 978-0-345-43043-4
- Followed by: Transcendence

Ascendance is the first novel in the second DemonWars Saga trilogy by R. A. Salvatore. The book is also the fifth out of seven books in the combined DemonWars Saga.

== Plot summary ==
The novel Ascendance begins the tale of Aydrian Wyndon, a tortured and lonely young man raised by the Touel'alfar to be a ranger even greater than his father and to, hopefully, be the salvation of the elves. The plans of the Touel'alfar go awry due to Aydrian's own arrogance, cultivated by a dark force. When he leaves the home of the elves, events occur which bring about great sorrow for himself, his mother and the kingdom.
