= Fantasy world =

Imaginary world created for fictional media

A fantasy world or fictional world is a world created for fictional media, such as literature, film or games. Typical fantasy worlds feature magical abilities. Some worlds may be a parallel world connected to Earth via magical portals or items (like Narnia); an imaginary society hidden within the Earth (like the Wizarding World); a fictional Earth set in the remote past (like Middle-earth) or future (like Dying Earth); an alternative version of our History (like Lyra's world); or an entirely independent world set in another part of the universe (like the Star Wars Galaxy).

Many fantasy worlds draw heavily on real world history, geography, sociology, mythology, and folklore.

== Plot function ==
The setting of a fantasy work is often of great importance to the plot and characters of the story. The setting itself can be imperiled by the evil of the story, suffer a calamity, and be restored by the transformation the story brings about. Stories that use the setting as merely a backdrop for the story have been criticized for their failure to use it fully.

Even when the land itself is not in danger, it is often used symbolically, for thematic purposes, and to underscore moods. For readers, fantasy worlds offer a "place...[where] assumptions and desires [about the genre] are confirmed" and emotional satisfaction that comes from various elements of the world fulfill readers' expectations for quality.

== History ==
Early fantasy worlds appeared as fantasy lands, part of the same planet but separated by geographical barriers. For example, Oz, though a fantasy world in every way, is described as part of this world. Although medieval peasants who seldom if ever traveled far from their villages could not conclusively say that it was impossible that, for example, an ogre could live a day's travel away, distant continents were necessary from the Renaissance onwards for such fantastic speculation to be plausible, until finally, further exploration rendered all such terrestrial fantasy lands implausible. Even within the span of mere decades, Oz, which had been situated in a desert in the United States when first written about in 1900, was relocated to a spot in the Pacific Ocean.

An early example of the fantasy land/world concept can be seen in the One Thousand and One Nights (Arabian Nights), where places of which little was known, but where the occurrence of marvels was thus more credible, had to be set "long ago" or "far away". This is a process that continues and finally culminates in the fantasy world having little connection, if any, to actual times and places. A more recent example of a fantasy land with definite connections to the actual world is Austin Tappan Wright's Islandia. Islandia's remoteness and aura of mystery, as well as its preservation of an arcadian society, are explained by means of a law that allows only limited contact with foreigners.

Dream frames were also once common for encasing the fantasy world with an explanation of its marvels. Such a dream frame was added to the story of The Wonderful Wizard of Oz for the movie version; in the book, Oz is clearly defined as an actual place. H. P. Lovecraft made active use of the dream frame, creating elaborate geographies accessible to humans only when they were asleep and dreaming. These dream settings have been criticized, and are far less frequent today. This change is part of a general trend toward more self-consistent and substantive fantasy worlds. This has also altered the nature of the plots; earlier works often feature a solitary individual whose adventures in the fantasy world are of personal significance, and where the world clearly exists to give scope to these adventures, and later works more often feature characters in a social web, where their actions are to save the world and those in it from peril.

== Common elements ==
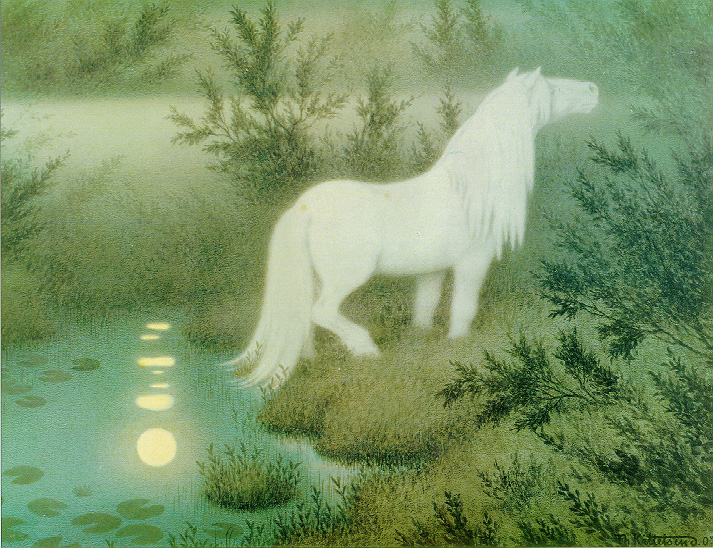
"The Nix as a brook horse" by Theodor Kittelsen: folklore transformed into a fantasy world

The most common fantasy world is one based on medieval Europe, and has been since William Morris used it in his early fantasy works, such as The Well at the World's End, and particularly since the 1954 publication of J.R.R. Tolkien's The Lord of the Rings. Such a world is often called "pseudo-medieval"—particularly when the writer has snatched up random elements from the era, which covered a thousand years and a continent, and thrown them together without consideration for their compatibility, or even introduced ideas not so much based on the medieval era as on romanticized views of it. When these worlds are copied not so much from history as from other fantasy works, there is a heavy tendency to uniformity and lack of realism. The full width and breadth of the medieval era is seldom drawn upon. Governments, for instance, tend to be uncompromisingly feudal-based, or evil empires or oligarchies, usually corrupt, while there was far more variety of rule in the actual Middle Ages. Fantasy worlds also tend to be economically medieval, and disproportionately pastoral.

Careful world-building plus meticulous attention to detail is often cited as the reason why certain fantasy works are deeply convincing and contain a magical sense of place. Heavy and faithful use of real-world setting for inspiration, as in Barry Hughart's Bridge of Birds, clearly derived from China, or Lloyd Alexander's use of real-world cultures such as Welsh for The Chronicles of Prydain or Indian for The Iron Ring, make the line between fantasy worlds and alternate histories fuzzy. The use of cultural elements, and still more history and geography, from actual settings, pushes a work toward alternative history.

Conversely, the creation by an author of an imaginary country—such as Ruritania or Graustark—does not automatically transform that imaginary country into a fantasy world, even if the location would be impossible in reality owing to a lack of land to contain it; but such Ruritanian romances may be pushed toward the category of fantasy worlds by the introduction of figures such as witches and wise women, where it is not clear if their magic is effectual.

According to Lin Carter in Imaginary Worlds: The Art of Fantasy, fantasy worlds, by their nature, contain some element of magic. This element may be the creatures in it (dragons, unicorns, genies and so on) or the magical abilities of the people inhabiting the world. These are often drawn from mythology and folklore, frequently that of the historical country also used for inspiration.

== Constructed worlds ==
Fantasy worlds created through a process called world building are known as a constructed world. Constructed worlds elaborate and make self-consistent the setting of fantasy work. World building often relies on materials and concepts taken from the real world.

Despite the use of magic or other fantastic elements such as dragons, the world is normally presented as one that would function normally, one in which people could actually live, making economic, historical, and ecological sense. It is considered a flaw to have, for example, pirates living in lands far from trade routes, or to assign prices for a night's stay in an inn that would equate to several years’ income.

Furthermore, the fantastic elements should ideally operate according to self-consistent rules of their own; for example, if wizards' spells sap their strength, a wizard who does not appear to suffer this must either be putting up a facade or have an alternative explanation. This distinguishes fantasy worlds from Surrealism and even from such dream worlds as are found in Alice's Adventures in Wonderland and Through the Looking-Glass.

=== Examples ===
- L. Frank Baum created the Land of Oz for his novel The Wonderful Wizard of Oz and its original sequels. He was one of the few authors before Tolkien to use consistent internal geographies and histories to enrich his world.
- C. S. Lewis, author of The Chronicles of Narnia, set that series' novels mostly in a magical land called Narnia. Lewis was a colleague of Tolkien, and their fictional worlds share several key elements.
- Terry Pratchett created Discworld, a large disc resting on the backs of four huge elephants, which are in turn standing on the back of an enormous turtle, as it slowly swims through space.
- J. R. R. Tolkien created Middle-earth, a famous fantasy world. He introduced several revolutionary concepts to fantasy fiction and popularized the idea of intricately detailed fantasy worlds. He wrote at some length about the process, which he called "sub-creation". Middle-earth is intended to be Earth's Old World in a fictional ancient era.
- George R. R. Martin created a fictional world for his novel series A Song of Ice and Fire. Martin said in 2003 that complete world maps were deliberately not made available so that readers may better identify with people of the real Middle Ages who were unilluminated about distant places. Most of the story is set in the western continent of Westeros, though some are set in the Eastern continent Essos. The Southern continent of Sothoryos is also shown on maps, with a possible fourth continent, Ulthos, to its East. A map of the world is shown in the title sequence of the HBO TV adaptation, Game of Thrones.
- Robert Jordan created unnamed fictional world for his opus magnum The Wheel of Time.

Due to the fuzzy boundary between fantasy and science fiction, it is sometimes difficult to make a hard-and-fast distinction between "fantasy worlds" and planets in science fiction. For example, the worlds of Barsoom, Darkover, Gor, and the Witch World combine elements of both genres and fantasy worlds may have nonexistent, powerful technology.

== Fairytale and comic fantasy ==
Fairytale fantasy may ignore the normal world-building in order to present a world operating by the same logic as the fairytales from which they are derived, though other works in this subgenre develop their worlds fully. Comic fantasy may ignore all possible logic in search of humor, particularly if it is parodying other fantasies' faulty world-building, as in Diana Wynne Jones's Dark Lord of Derkholm, or the illogic of the setting is integral to the comedy, as in L. Sprague de Camp's Solomon's Stone, where the fantasy world is populated by the heroic and glamorous figures that people daydream about being, resulting in a severe shortage of workers in the more mundane, day-to-day industries. Most other subgenres of fantasy suffer if the world-building is neglected.

== Retreat of magic ==
Rather than creating their own fantasy world, many authors choose to set their novels in Earth's past. In order to explain the absence of miraculous elements, authors may introduce "a retreat of magic" (sometimes called "thinning") that explains why the magic and other fantastic elements no longer appear: For example, in The Lord of the Rings, the destruction of the One Ring defeated Sauron, but also destroyed the power of the Three Rings of the elves, resulting in them sailing to the West at the end of the story. A contemporary fantasy necessarily takes place in what purports to be the real world, and not a fantasy world. It may, however, include references to such a retreat. J. K. Rowling's Fantastic Beasts and Where to Find Them explains that wizards eventually decided to conceal all magical creatures and artifacts from non-magic users.

== Role-playing games ==
Dungeons & Dragons, the first major role-playing game, has created several detailed and commercially successful fantasy worlds (called "campaign settings"), with established characters, locations, histories, and sociologies. The Forgotten Realms is perhaps the most extensively developed of these worlds.

== See also ==
- List of fantasy worlds
- List of fictional universes
- Mythopoeia
- Paracosm
- Worldbuilding
- Planets in Science Fiction
