= The Highwayman (novel) =

2004 novel by R. A. Salvatore

- Cover
- Author: R. A. Salvatore
- Language: English
- Series: Corona
- Genre: Fantasy/Ethnic
- Publisher: CDS books
- Publication date: 2004
- Publication place: United States
- Pages: 405 (paperback)

The Highwayman is a 2004 fantasy novel by American writer R. A. Salvatore, set in his world of Corona, shared with his Demon Wars Saga. The Highwayman tells the story of a young crippled boy named Bransen Garibond. The orphaned son of the Jhesta Tu mystic Sen Wi and the Abellican priest Brother Dynard, he eventually is able to move normally by learning to center his body to become the hero known as the Highwayman.

== Plot ==
Pryd Holding, where much of the story is set, is troubled by the threat of powrie dwarves, domination by other kingdoms and religious conflicts between the brutal Samhaists, led by the cruel and evil Bernivvigar and the seemingly more benevolent brothers of Blessed Abelle, to which Brother Bran Dynard belongs. Also complicating matters is that Prince Prydae, the last of his line, suffers an injury in battle that leaves him impotent. Brother Dynard has recently returned from the south, where he was sent to enlighten the people, but instead became fascinated and enlightened by the people, and took a wife, the beautiful Jhesta Tu mystic Sen Wi. Sen Wi has come to Pryd holding with Dynard to help explain the ways of her people to the brothers of Blessed Abelle.

One night, a beautiful young woman, Callen Duwornay, is sentenced to death for adultery. Forced to endure sexual humiliation as part of her punishment, she is stripped completely naked in front of the community, is bitten by a poison snake and then left for dead, hung over the road that is being constructed to connect Pryd Holding with the other kingdoms as a warning to others. Sen Wi and Dynard find her hanging naked and rescue her from the dwarves that are beating her. Sen Wi uses her training to heal Callen and they take her to Dynard's friend, Garibond, to heal. After recovering, an apparently still naked Callen leaves Garibonds home and disappears. Some time later, after changing her name, Callen gives birth to a daughter, whom she names Cadayale.

Brother Dynard and Sen Wi go before the brothers of Abelle, but they are appalled to find that he was "enlightened" by the "beasts of Behr" rather than enlightening them as he was supposed to. Additionally, the brothers refuse to recognize Sen Wi as his wife, referring to her instead dismissively as his concubine. Sen Wi realizes that she is pregnant and that her baby is suffering within her due to her having taken the poison and pain from Callen into herself. Sen Wi later dies giving birth in Garibond's home, using the last of her strength to save her son, whom Garibond names Bransen, combining his parents name. Dynard himself is later killed by a dwarf on the highway when he is sent to see the higher order of Abelle.

Adopted by Garibond, Bransen is a constant source of ridicule, mockery and abuse in the town by local bullies due to his disfigurement, shown kindness only by Cadayale, daughter of Callen. With old age overtaking him and suffering a terrible injury to himself due to the cruel machinations of Bernivvigar, who wishes to sacrifice Bransen, Garibond makes a deal with the brothers of Abelle to take in Bransen should he die. Garibond himself is later burned to death for heresy and for harboring the Book of Jhest, written by Dynard. After this, Bransen is taken in by the monks, but most of them treat him cruelly as well.

Bransen utilizes both sides of his heritage in the novel to overcome his crippled state and become the Highwayman. With help from a soul stone, the hematite, combined with his knowledge of The Book of Jhest, Bransen overcomes his physically weak form by centering his chi, which greatly increases his mobility. With his newfound ability, he rescues Cadayale from the bullies who wished to rape and beat her for helping him, killing the lead bully, Tarkus Breen. After weeks of robbing from the tax collectors to give back to the poor, becoming a local Robin Hood, Bransen risks everything to rescue Cadayale and Callen from Bernivvigar and Prydae, who sought to rape Cadayale to beget an heir, leading to the deaths of both men. Afterward, Bransen, Cadayale and Callen are banished from Pryd Holding by Bannagran, Prydae's closest friend and temporary ruler. With hope in their hearts, the three depart for the south to seek a better life.

In 2007, Matthew Hansen of Marvel Comics/Dabel Brothers Productions adapted The Highwayman to a comic book.
