= The Crimson Shadow series =

Fantasy novel series by R. A. Salvatore

The Crimson Shadow series is a fantasy novel series created by R. A. Salvatore. It consists of three books:

- The Sword of Bedwyr, published in 1994
- Luthien's Gamble, published in 1996
- The Dragon King, published in 1996

In 2006, the series was re-published as an omnibus under the title The Crimson Shadow.

== The Sword of Bedwyr ==
The Sword of Bedwyr is the first book in the series.

=== Plot summary ===
Luthien Bedwyr lives on Isle Bedwydrin, an island where they are bred as soldiers and fight in an arena for pleasure. When Viscount Aubrey, cousin of Duke Morkney of Montfort, visits the island, Luthien's world is turned upside down. After defeating Garth Rogar, a rival in the arena, but a friend in life, Luthien is told to kill him by Viscount Aubrey. When he doesn't, one of the Viscount's cyclopian guards kills Garth instead. Luthien swears on his dead mother that he will avenge Garth in front of Katerin O'Hale, his lover. He runs away alone after killing the cyclopian who murdered his friend and on the road meets Oliver deBurrows, a highway-halfling that steals from rich merchants which cross his path, and his mutated donkey, Threadbare. Together, Luthien and Oliver cross the Dorsal Sea and go to the mainland, where they are saved from numerous cyclopians by a wizard named Brind'Amour. In return, he tasks them with finding his staff in a cave. Inside the cave, they find a crimson cape that renders the wearer invisible and a folding bow, and are attacked by the dragon Balthazar. Ultimately, Brind'Amour acquires the staff inside the cave and saves the two bandits from the dragon. The wizard then gives Oliver a "housbreaker" and a magical grapnel. Luthien and Oliver go to Montfort where they commit a dozen thefts. However, the magical cape from the cave casts a crimson shadow that cannot be removed. Seeing the shadow, merchants declare the second coming of the Crimson Shadow, a legendary, ancient thief, though in reality it is actually Luthien. Along the way, Luthien falls for a half-elf slave in the market. He tries to free her from her master, but finds that she is also a thief. Later, she is captured by Duke Morkney because she is Luthien's love interest. He goes to free her, and a revolt starts after he fires upon Morkney. He chases the Duke to the top of a giant chapel called the Ministry, where Duke Morkney becomes the demon Praehotec and is ultimately slain by Luthien. In the epilogue, Katerin O'Hale returns from Isle Bedwydrin with news and a gift. She says that Luthien's father Gahris has revolted and not a single cyclopian lives on Isle Bedwyrdin. He gives the Sword of Bedwyr - Blind Striker - to Luthien, now the Crimson Shadow and the leader of a ragtag insurgency in Montfort that has taken control of half the city.

=== Characters ===
Luthien Bedwyr
Luthien Bedwyr is the main character of the series (along with Oliver deBurrows, Katerin O'Hale, and Brind'Amour). The youngest son of the Eorl of Bedwydrin (the island where he grew up), he lived his life in ignorance to the evils of King Greensparrow, spending his days training to fight in the arena. Eventually he is forced to flee when he takes revenge for the unjust killing of his friend, Garth Rogar (by killing the Cyclopian that had done the deed). Luthien eventually meets up with Oliver deBurrows on the road and the two travel together. Through a series of events perpetuated by the wizard Brind'Amour, Luthien and Oliver find themselves in the city of Montfort where Luthien soon begins to take on the title of the Crimson Shadow. He originally wields an undistinguished sword and bow, which are eventually replaced by the sword Blind Striker (a family heirloom), and a folding bow.

Oliver deBurrows
Oliver Burrows aka Oliver deBurrows is a "highway-halfling" from Gascony. He is first seen robbing a stagecoach. Luthien, seeing that Oliver was in trouble, rushes out to save him. An incorrigible thief, Oliver travels with Luthien to Montfort where they start a life of stealing from the corrupt and wealthy and occasionally helping out the meager and impoverished. Oliver is one of Luthien's closest companions and is always there for Luthien. Oliver wields a rapier and main gauche and is given the "House-Breaker", a magically enchanted harness with useful and equally magical tools in its pouches, by the wizard Brind'Amour.

== Luthien's Gamble ==
Luthien's Gamble (1996) is the second book in the series.

This is another tale of Luthien Bedwyr who has become the warrior-thief known as the "Crimson Shadow". This time he must rouse the peasants and fierce tribes of Eriador to fight the demonic wizard-king Greensparrow and his bloodthirsty warriors.

== The Dragon King ==
The Dragon King (1996) is the third and final book in the series.

Luthien Bedwyr, leader of the peasant armies, refuses to admit certain defeat even though the situation appears hopeless. He faces the wizard-king Greensparrow. The Crimson Shadow will aid the young warrior, but even this unquenchable force of magic may falter against Greensparrow's ultimate weapon.
