= The DemonWars Saga =

Series of high-fantasy novels by R. A. Salvatore

- Author: R. A. Salvatore
- Country: United States
- Language: English
- Genre: High fantasy; Adventure
- Published: 1997–2003
- Media type: Print (hardback and paperback); Ebook

The DemonWars Saga is a series of high fantasy novels by R. A. Salvatore. It is set in the world of Corona, primarily in the kingdoms of Honce-the-Bear and Behren, and amongst the nomadic To-gai-ru. The series is separated into two trilogies connected by a single book, Mortalis. The saga has an accompanying roleplaying game entitled Demon Wars.

== The first trilogy ==
=== The Demon Awakens ===
Divided by the catastrophe and the destruction of their village, Dundalis, Elbryan Wyndon and Jilseponie "Pony" Ault struggle to sort out their lives. Elbryan is taken in by the Touel'alfar, the winged elves of Corona, while Pony makes her way to the city of Palmaris where she is raised by the Chilichunks, a husband and wife who own a tavern in the city. Meanwhile, Avelyn Desbris comes to terms with the all-too-human brothers of the Abellican Church and the myriad injustices he witnesses them cause.

During their time apart, Elbryan is trained by the Touel'alfar as a ranger and takes on the name Nightbird, while Pony becomes a barmaid at the Chilichunk's tavern, Fellowship Way, and eventually enters into the military after marrying the nobleman Conner Bildeborough, before rejecting him on their wedding night, annulling it. Avelyn learns to use powerful gemstone magic, but leaves the Church after finding it to not be the holy place he had hoped for and receiving a vision of the awakened Demon Dactyl.

Elbryan and his friends recruit the people of the Timberlands, whose homes have been destroyed by the demon's army, and train them into a guerrilla fighting force. With them, the three attack the enemy, but it becomes apparent that the only way to truly stop the encroaching darkness is to defeat the dactyl itself. They journey to the Barbican and Mount Aida to face the dactyl, and it is defeated at the cost of Avelyn sacrificing himself.

=== The Demon Spirit ===
Even with the destruction of the Dactyl Bestesbulzibar, its servants continue to roam the land wreaking havoc. Elbryan, Pony, and the small group of fighters they have recruited, defeat the demon's army as best they can. They discover that their friend Bradwarden, who they thought was dead, is still alive and taken by the Church. The Chilichunks are also captured as a means to lure Pony out so that Father Abbot Markwart can take back the Ring Stones stolen by Avelyn.

The Church no longer has a solid foundation; Master Jojonah is a high-ranking member of the Church and a former teacher of Avelyn. He sees the rot in his beloved institution and works quietly to bring about Avelyn's truth, which leads to his death as Elbryan and his companions free Bradwarden.

=== The Demon Apostle ===
Elbryan travels north to reclaim the Timberlands while Pony heads south to the city of Palmaris. Eventually, Elbryan, Pony and their companions confront Markwart, his lackey Marcalo De'Unnero, and the spirit of Bestesbulzibar. In the end De'Unnero is defeated, Markwart is slain, and Bestebulzibar's spirit flees again. Elbyran succumbs to wounds inflicted in his battle with Marcalo.

== Mortalis ==
Pony copes with Elbryan's death and fights against a plague infecting the people of the kingdom. Aydrian Wyndon, Elbryan's and Pony's child, and Brynn Dharielle, a To-Gai girl turned ranger, are introduced to the story.

== The second trilogy ==
=== Ascendance ===
The plans of the Touel'alfar go awry due to Aydrian's own arrogance, cultivated by a dark force.

=== Transcendence ===
Brynn Dharielle embarks on a quest to free her people from the tyranny of the Behrenese kingdom.

=== Immortalis ===
The final novel of the DemonWars Saga brings all of the main characters from the previous two books together to combat the evil still residing in the land.

== Characters ==
=== Elbryan Wyndon ===
The nephew of ranger Mather Wyndon, he was taken in and trained by the Touel'alfar, the winged elves of Corona. After several years of training under his mentor and close friend Belli'mar Juraviel, he is given the name Nightbird and is charged to defend the lands of the North against the armies of Bestesbulzibar, the Demon dactyl. Alongside his mate and later wife Pony and her mentor, former Abellican Brother Avelyn Desbris, Elbryan goes to Mount Aida and defies the dactyl.

After this victory, Elbryan leads the resistance against the remaining evil forces and takes the fight to the corrupt leadership of the Abellican Church that betrayed Avelyn. He is killed in the final battle against the Church after fighting the Bishop of Palmaris Marcalo De'Unnero. He is given a national funeral and recognized as a ranger even greater than his uncle was.

During the final days of the war between Pony and her son Aydrian (who was also possessed by the demon), the young man summons his father's zombie-spirit to defeat his mother. Pony awoke Elbryan's consciousness from within the zombie and they banish Bestesbulzibar from Aydrian's body. After Pony's death, Aydrian breaks the spell protecting Andur'Blough, the hidden valley of the elves, and destroys what remains of Bestesbulzibar.

=== Jilseponie "Pony" Wyndon Ursal ===
Pony is Elbryan's childhood friend. The destruction of their village breaks her mind and she was unable to remember what had happened. She isadopted by a family of Palmaris, the Chilichunks, and slowly regains her memory. She marries a young nobleman named Connor but all her attempts to love him make the dark memories of her past return. Although patient at first, Connor tries to rape her, but he stops and ends the marriage. He gives Pony a way out by offering to let her join the army, which she accepts. After joining the army, she meets former Abellican Brother Avelyn Desbris, who had run away from the Church with hundreds of gemstones, the source of their power. Pony and Avelyn ran away together and the monk trains her in the ways of the stones. She becomes a powerful magician and is reunited with Elbryan.

After the dactyl's destruction and Avelyn's death, Pony helps the resistance against the advance of goblin and powrie forces in the North of Corona. However, the Abellican Church wants the gemstones back sends two monks after her. The monks are defeated but Father Abbot Markwart captures her family. When she finds them dead, she vows revenge against the Church. She later becomes pregnant with Elbryan's child but it was seemingly killed during a duel with Markwart. In her rage, she kills Markwart.

Years later, Pony discovers her son Aydrian is alive and had been trained by the elves like his father. Around this time, she falls in love with and marries King Danube Brock Ursal becoming Queen of Honce-The-Bear. Aydrian, who had been corrupted by Bestesbulzibar's spirit, kills her new husband and usurps the throne. Allying with her brother-in-law, Prince Midalis, Pony declares war on her son. In the final battle against Aydrian's army, Pony fights against her son, her husband's zombie-spirit, and Bestesbulzibar's spirit. She summons Elbryan's consciousness from within the zombie and they release Aydrian from the demon's hold. Ten years later, Pony dies after spending the last decade with her son. After her death, Aydrian seeks to release Andur'Blough from Bestesbulzibar's control and succeeds with help from the spirits of the dead rangers.

=== Avelyn Desbris ===
Brother Avelyn Desbris is an Abellican monk and Pony's mentor in the art of the Stones' magic. Devoted to God, Avelyn works hard to join the Abellican Church and succeeds. He becomes a center of great attention when he crosses the Gauntlet of Pain without flinching. Father Abbot Dalebert Markwart, the supreme leader of the Church, and Master Jojonah think highly of him and start to groom him to be one of the four monks to travel to the island of Pimaninicuit where the gemstones fall from the skies.

After having collected the greatest number of gemstones ever and losing one brother, Avelyn and his companions return to St. Mere Abelle. During the trip, Avelyn falls in love with Dansally Comerwick, a woman who is on the ship for the crew's pleasure. After returning, the Abellican monks kill the crew, including Dansally. Avelyn steals the gemstones and runs away after killing Master Siherton. As he escapes, he has a vision of the Demon Dactyl and realizes that the great evil has returned to Corona.

For the next ten years, Avelyn wanders around Coron to warn the people of the Dactyl's return but also falling progressively into a brawler and an alcoholic. After meeting Pony, the two form a strong bond and ran away together. During this time, Avelyn teaches her how to use the gemstones he had stolen and she became a powerful magician herself.

However, the Church had not forgotten about Avelyn and, using his fellow student Quintall as their tool, their Brother Justice, they try to reclaim the gemstones and assassinate Avelyn for his heresy. After Jilseponie was captured by Brother Justice and used as bait, Avelyn allies with Elbryan Wyndon to release her. Avelyn remains with the resistance run by Elbryan and Pony, using his magic to defeat the hordes of goblins, giants and powries that served as the Dactyl's armies.

Avelyn is killed during his duel with the Dactyl in Mount Aida where he destroys the Demon's physical form. Bishop Francis Delacourt of Palmaris, once the Father Abbot's most trusted advisor and staunch anti-Avelynist, recommends to Bishop of Honce-the-Bear, Je'howeth, that Avelyn be canonized as a saint of the Abellican Church. His teachings help change the Abellican Church for the better.

=== Aydrian Wyndon ===
Aydrian Wyndon is Elbryan and Pony's son. He was taken and raised secretly by Lady Dasselrond, the Queen of the Touel'alfar. The elves had allowed Pony to believe her child had died in the womb in her spirit battle with Markwart. Also kept secret from all, including the elves, was that the Demon Dactyl's spirit had infected the child's soul and left a piece of itself there.

Aydrian is raised under the harsh tutelage of the elves. From a very young age he begins his ranger training, and Lady Dasselrond also trains him to use the magic gemstones, being the only elf to possess a stone and have any knowledge with using them.

Aydrian demonstrates he is as good of a fighter as his father and as powerful as his mother with the magic gemstones, if not more. Under the guidance of the Demon Dactyl's spirit, he is able to tap deeper into the magic gemstones than anyone in history besides the legendary St. Abelle, who was the founder of the entire Abellican Order.

Aydrian leaves the elves after overpowering the queen in a magical test of wills. During his journeys he meets his parents' sworn enemy Marcalo De'Unnero (who had become a weretiger). They join forces and began to plot until Aydrian kills King Danube and takes the throne for himself. As king he threw the lands into war and is defeated by Midalis.

During the battle Aydrian displays his gemstone power by bringing his father's corpse back to life. However, as his father became whole he regains control of himself and with Pony they use a soul stone to attack their son's spirit and find the Demon Dactyl there. They fight the demon as they had before and free their son. During the spiritual battle Aydrian is physically rendered frozen and has his heart pierced by Brynn Dharielle, dying shortly after being freed from the demon. Pony uses her soul stone, and with Elbryan's help they bring Aydrian back to life at the expense of Elbryan's life.

== Publication ==
- Salvatore, R. A. (1997). The Demon Awakens: The DemonWars Saga vol. I. Del Rey. ISBN 0-345-39149-7.
- Salvatore, R. A. (1998). The Demon Spirit: The DemonWars Saga vol. II. Del Rey. ISBN 0-345-39152-7.
- Salvatore, R. A. (1999). The Demon Apostle: The DemonWars Saga vol. III. Del Rey. ISBN 0-345-39153-5.
- Salvatore, R. A. (2000). Mortalis. Del Rey. ISBN 0-345-43039-5.
- Salvatore, R. A. (2001). Ascendance: The Second DemonWars Saga vol. I. Del Rey. ISBN 0-345-43040-9.
- Salvatore, R. A. (2002). Transcendence: The Second DemonWars Saga vol. II. Del Rey. ISBN 0-345-43041-7.
- Salvatore, R. A. (2003). Immortalis: The Second DemonWars Saga vol. III. Del Rey. ISBN 0-345-44122-2.

== Critical reception ==
The series has been reviewed positively by the sources that have critiqued it. When critiquing the series, Aiden Moher gave it a positive review, noting that "By mixing philosophical themes about power, corruption, religion and free will with typical adventurous tropes and set pieces, Salvatore delivers a heady mix that manages to bring together so many elements of what makes secondary world fantasy so wonderful... in DemonWars the true villains are greed and corruption, fear, desire and anger. All the characters... succumb to these weaknesses" McLaurin, when writing for SF Site also reviewed the first novel positively, noting "If Salvatore's goal is to write books that are fun to read, he achieves it with The Demon Awakens." Publishers Weekly, however, when reviewing the later installment Child of a Mad God, criticised Salvatore's worldbuilding as "lacklustre".

== Other media ==
=== Audiobooks ===
The audio entertainment publisher GraphicAudio has produced all seven books of The DemonWars Saga with a full cast of voice actors, narrator, sound effects and original music.
