= R. A. Salvatore =

American writer (born 1959)

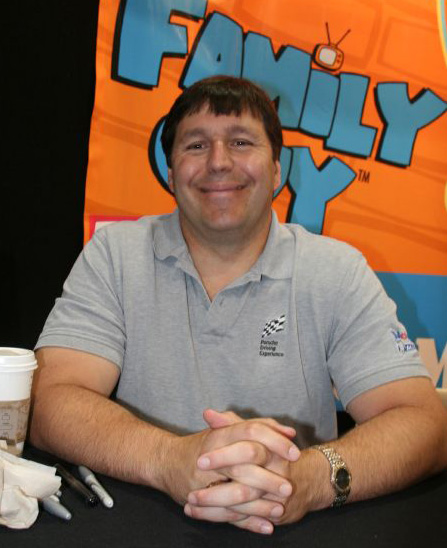
- Salvatore in 2006
- Born: Robert Anthony Salvatore; January 20, 1959 (age 67); Leominster, Massachusetts, U.S.
- Education: Fitchburg State University (BS, BA)
- Occupation: Novelist
- Spouse: Diane Salvatore
- Writing career
- Language: English
- Period: 1982–present
- Genres: Fantasy, science fiction
- Notable works: The Legend of Drizzt; The DemonWars Saga
- Website: rasalvatore.com

Robert Anthony Salvatore (born January 20, 1959) is an American author best known for The Legend of Drizzt, a series of fantasy novels set in the Forgotten Realms and starring the character Drizzt Do'Urden. He has also written The DemonWars Saga, a series of high fantasy novels; several other Forgotten Realms novels; and Vector Prime, the first novel in the Star Wars: The New Jedi Order series. He has sold more than 15 million copies of his books in the United States alone, and 22 of his titles have been New York Times best-sellers.

== Early life and education ==
Salvatore was born in Leominster, Massachusetts, the youngest of a family of seven. A graduate of Leominster High School, he has said his high-school English teacher was instrumental in his development as a writer. During his time at Fitchburg State College, he became interested in fantasy after reading J. R. R. Tolkien's The Lord of the Rings, given to him as a Christmas gift. He developed an interest in fantasy and other literature, and changed his major from computer science to journalism, earning a Bachelor of Science in communications/media in 1981. Later he earned a Bachelor of Arts in English. Before taking up writing full-time, he worked as a bouncer. He attributes his fierce and vividly described battle scenes to his experience as a bouncer.

In 1997, Salvatore's letters, manuscripts, and other professional papers were donated to the R. A. Salvatore collection at Fitchburg State.

== Career ==
=== 1980s–1990s ===
In 1982, Salvatore started writing more seriously, developing a manuscript, Echoes of the Fourth Magic, about a submarine sucked into a post-apocalyptic future that resembled a fantasy world. He created the setting of Ynis Aielle for the novel, writing it in longhand by candlelight. Salvatore sent the work to several publishers from 1983 to 1987, including TSR, Inc. Mary Kirchoff, then working for TSR's book department in reviewing the slush pile of unsolicited submissions, did not like the story much, but did like Salvatore's writing. TSR was then looking for an author to write the second book in the Forgotten Realms line and asked Salvatore to audition. In July 1987, he won the assignment. Much of the Realms setting was then undeveloped and waiting to be fleshed out, giving Salvatore relatively free rein. He wrote his first published novel, The Crystal Shard, in just two months, and TSR published it in 1988. Salvatore's Icewind Dale trilogy (The Crystal Shard, Streams of Silver, and The Halfling's Gem) was a huge hit, with over 1.5 million copies sold of the first two novels, and the third book hitting The New York Times list of paperback bestsellers. Salvatore's first novel published in hardcover was another Drizzt book, The Legacy (1992). It reached the number 9 slot on The New York Times list of bestsellers in September 1992. In 1994, Salvatore branched out beyond working for TSR; he signed a three-book deal with Warner Books for what became The Crimson Shadow series. He and TSR engaged in a dispute afterward. TSR's managing editor of the fiction department, Brian Thomsen, wanted Salvatore to write six additional novels when renewing the contract, rather than the three that Salvatore offered. Salvatore, who had just agreed to write three novels for Warner and had written 14 in the previous six years, was unwilling to commit to write so many novels in such a short time at the rate TSR offered; he would have to write three novels a year to honor all his obligations to TSR and Warner had he taken TSR's contract as written. Thomsen suggested that Salvatore find a ghostwriter, a suggestion Salvatore found distasteful. Negotiations ultimately fell through; TSR was unwilling to budge on its demands and unwilling to put the Drizzt brand on hold while Salvatore finished books for other publishers. TSR also possibly believed that the "brand" was more valuable than any specific author, as Thomsen said he would find another author to write Drizzt (TSR owned the rights to the Forgotten Realms and all its characters). For his part, Salvatore felt bullied by the company to which he had contributed such a valuable property, and signed a three-novel deal with Del Rey instead for what became The DemonWars Saga. His last Drizzt novel for some time was 1996's Passage to Dawn, fulfilling his previous contract. Salvatore publicly said that if TSR assigned another author to write Drizzt, he would never write Drizzt again and would consider Drizzt dead. TSR followed through with its threat and chose a new author to write Drizzt stories; Mark Anthony completed the Drizzt novel The Shores of Dusk. After Wizards of the Coast acquired TSR in 1997, one of its first actions was to fire Thomsen and attempt to mend broken bonds with TSR's authors. Wizards shelved Anthony's novel to lure Salvatore back. Salvatore returned to the Drizzt series with The Silent Blade (1998), which won the Origins Award that year. He published several more series of books in the Forgotten Realms campaign world.

Salvatore wrote Vector Prime, which was published in 1999 as the first novel in the Star Wars: The New Jedi Order series. Vector Prime was controversial among Star Wars fans because its plot included the death of Chewbacca, who became the first major character from the original trilogy to be killed in the Star Wars expanded universe novels. Many fans thought that Salvatore had made this decision, but in fact Lucasfilm and Del Rey's editors had decided they needed to kill a character to sell the new threat of the Yuuzhan Vong; the editors wanted to kill Luke Skywalker, but were refused permission by Lucasfilm. Randy Stradley, then an editor at Dark Horse Comics, suggested killing Chewbacca, and the decision was made. Much later, after Disney bought the rights to Star Wars in 2012, it declared in 2014 that all Expanded Universe works released before 2014 were non-canon. Chewbacca's death in Vector Prime was cited as a major reason for revoking the canonical status of so many works.

=== 2000s–present ===
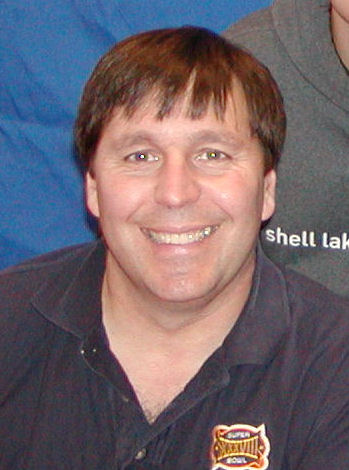
Salvatore at a book signing in 2008

In February 2008, Devil's Due Publishing published Spooks, a comic book about a U.S. government anti-paranormal investigator/task force created by Larry Hama and Salvatore. Hama created the military characters and plots, and Salvatore covered the monster characters.

In addition to his novels, Salvatore has written for video games. He wrote the story for the PlayStation 2, Xbox and PC video game Forgotten Realms: Demon Stone (2004), working with the design team at Stormfront Studios. The game was published by Atari and was nominated for awards by the Academy of Interactive Arts & Sciences and BAFTA. CDS books commissioned him to edit a four-book series based on the interactive online EverQuest game. He also wrote the bot chat lines for the Quake III bots.

Salvatore was hired as creative director for the newly created game developer 38 Studios, owned by former baseball player Curt Schilling. He wrote the dialogue and created a backstory spanning 10,000 years for the fantasy game Kingdoms of Amalur: Reckoning, which was released in 2012 and sold over one million units. But three months later, 38 Studios declared bankruptcy and ceased operations. The company laid off its entire staff, including Salvatore, with the $2 million fee for his services never paid. Salvatore said he harbored no ill will toward Schilling, who "didn't do anything nefarious" and also suffered losses.

In 2010, Wizards of the Coast announced a new deal with Salvatore to write six more books featuring Drizzt; the books were released between 2011 and 2016.

== Bibliography ==
Salvatore is best known for The Legend of Drizzt, a series of fantasy novels set in the Forgotten Realms and starring the character Drizzt Do'Urden. He has also written several other Forgotten Realms novels; The DemonWars Saga (a series of high fantasy novels); Vector Prime (the first novel in the Star Wars: The New Jedi Order series); and several other novels and series (see bibliography for full list).
