= List of Marvel Comics publications (S) =

Marvel Comics is an American comic book company dating to 1961. This is a list of the publications it has released in its history under the "Marvel Comics" imprint. The list does not include collected editions; trade paperbacks; digital comics; free, promotional giveaways; sketchbooks; poster books or magazines, nor does it include series published by other Marvel imprints such as Epic, Icon or Star. It also does not include titles published by Marvel's pre-1961 predecessors Timely Comics and Atlas Comics.

- List of Marvel Comics publications (A)
- List of Marvel Comics publications (B–C)
- List of Marvel Comics publications (D–E)
- List of Marvel Comics publications (F–G)
- List of Marvel Comics publications (H–L)
- List of Marvel Comics publications (M)
- List of Marvel Comics publications (N–R)
- List of Marvel Comics publications (T–V)
- List of Marvel Comics publications (W–Z)

== S ==
Title	Series	Issues	Dates	Notes	Reference
Saban's Mighty Morphin Power Rangers		#1–7	Oct 1995 – May 1996		
Saban's Mighty Morphin Power Rangers	Ninja Rangers/VR Troopers	#1–5	Dec 1995 – Apr 1996		
Sable & Fortune		#1–4	Mar 2006 – Jun 2006	limited series	
Sabretooth	vol. 1	#1–4	Aug 1993 – Dec 1993	limited series	
Sabretooth	vol. 2	#1	Jan 1998	one-shot; also known as Sabretooth: Back to Nature	
Sabretooth	vol. 3	#1–4	Dec 2004 – Feb 2005	limited series	
Sabretooth	vol. 4	#1–5	Apr 2022 – Sep 2022	limited series	
Sabretooth	Classic	#1–15	May 1994 – Jul 1995		
Sabretooth	Mary Shelley Overdrive	#1–4	Aug 2002 – Nov 2002	limited series	
Sabretooth	Special	#1	Jan 1995	one-shot	
Sabretooth	The Dead Don't Talk	#1–5	Feb 2025 – Jun 2025	limited series	
Sabretooth & The Exiles		#1–5	Jan 2023 – May 2023	limited series	
The Saga of Crystar, Crystal Warrior		#1–11	May 1983 – Feb 1985		
The Saga of the Original Human Torch		#1–4	Apr 1990 – Jul 1990	limited series	
Saga of Squadron Supreme		#1	Jan 2006	one-shot	
Saga of the Sub-Mariner		#1–12	Nov 1988 – Oct 1989	limited series	
Sai: Dimensional Rivals		#1–5	Mar 2026 – Jul 2026	limited series	
Saint Sinner		#1–7	Oct 1993 – Apr 1994		
Sam Wilson, Captain America		#1–5	Mar 2025 – Jul 2025	limited series	
Samurai: Legend		#1–4	Sep 2008 – Dec 2008	limited series	
Saturday Morning: The Comic		#1	Mar 1996	one-shot; tie-in with the Saturday Morning: Cartoons' Greatest Hits album	
Savage Avengers	vol. 1	#0–28	Jul 2019 – Mar 2022		
Savage Avengers	vol. 1	Annual #1	2019		
Savage Avengers	vol. 2	#1–10	Jul 2022 – Apr 2023		
The Savage Axe of Ares		#1	Jun 2010	one-shot	
Savage Fists of Kung Fu		#1	1975	one-shot; also known as Special Collector's Edition Featuring Savage Fists of Kung Fu	
The Savage Hulk	vol. 1		Jan 1996	one-shot	
The Savage Hulk	vol. 2	#1–6	Aug 2014 – Jan 2015		
The Savage Return of Dracula		#1	1992	one-shot	
The Savage She-Hulk		#1–25	Feb 1980 – Feb 1982		
Savage Spider-Man		#1–5	Apr 2022 – Sep 2022	limited series	
The Savage Sword of Conan	vol. 1	#1–235	Aug 1974 – Jul 1995		
The Savage Sword of Conan	vol. 2	#1–12	Apr 2019 – Feb 2020		
Savage Tales	vol. 1	#1–12	May 1971 – Aug 1975		
Savage Tales	vol. 2	#1–8	Oct 1985 – Dec 1986		
Savage Wolverine	vol. 1	#1–23	Mar 2013 – Nov 2014		
Savage Wolverine	vol. 2	#1	Sep 2025	one-shot	
Scarlet Spider	vol. 1	#1–2	Nov 1995 – Dec 1995	between issues 63 and 64 of Spider-Man vol. 1	
Scarlet Spider	vol. 2	#1–25; 12.1	Mar 2012 – Feb 2014		
Scarlet Spider Unlimited		#1	Nov 1995	one-shot	
Scarlet Spiders		#1–3	Jan 2015 – Mar 2015	limited series	
Scarlet Witch	vol. 1	#1–4	Jan 1994 – Apr 1994	limited series	
Scarlet Witch	vol. 2	#1–15	Feb 2016 – Apr 2017		
Scarlet Witch	vol. 3	#1–10	Mar 2023 – Jan 2024		
Scarlet Witch	vol. 3	Annual #1	Aug 2023		
Scarlet Witch	vol. 4	#1–10	Aug 2024 – May 2025		
Scarlet Witch & Quicksilver		#1–4	Apr 2024 – Jul 2024	limited series	
Scooby-Doo		#1–9	Oct 1977 – Feb 1979		
Scorpio Rising: Wolverine/Nick Fury			Oct 1994	one-shot; also known as Wolverine & Nick Fury: Scorpio Rising	
Scourge of the Gods		#1–3	Jan 2009 – Mar 2009	limited series	
Scourge of the Gods	The Fall	#1–3	Jul 2009 – Sep 2009	limited series	
Scream: Curse Of Carnage		#1–6	Jan 2020 – Aug 2020	issue #6 released digitally-only	
The Screwtape Letters			Jun 1994	graphic novel adaptation	
Season One	Ant-Man		2012	graphic novel	
Season One	Avengers		2012	graphic novel	
Season One	Daredevil		2012	graphic novel	
Season One	Doctor Strange		2012	graphic novel	
Season One	Fantastic Four		2012	graphic novel	
Season One	Hulk		2012	graphic novel	
Season One	Iron Man		2013	graphic novel	
Season One	Spider-Man		2012	graphic novel	
Season One	Thor		2013	graphic novel	
Season One	Wolverine		2013	graphic novel	
Season One	X-Men		2012	graphic novel	
Season's Beatings		#1	Feb 2019	one-shot	
Secret Avengers	vol. 1	#1–37; 12.1, 21.1	Jul 2010 – Apr 2013		
Secret Avengers	vol. 2	#1–16	Apr 2013 – Apr 2014		
Secret Avengers	vol. 3	#1–15	May 2014 – Jun 2015		
The Secret Defenders		#1–25	Mar 1993 – Mar 1995		
Secret Empire		#0–10	Jun 2017 – Oct 2017	limited series	
Secret Empire	Brave New World	#1–5	Aug 2017 – Oct 2017		
Secret Empire	Omega	#1	Nov 2017	one-shot	
Secret Empire	Underground	#1	Aug 2017	one-shot	
Secret Empire	United	#1	Aug 2017	one-shot	
Secret Empire	Uprising	#1	Jul 2017	one-shot	
Secret Invasion (2008)		#1–8	Jun 2008 – Jan 2009	limited series	
Secret Invasion (2008)	Dark Reign	#1	Feb 2009	one-shot	
Secret Invasion (2008)	Fantastic Four	#1–3	Jul 2008 – Sep 2008	limited series	
Secret Invasion (2008)	Front Line	#1–5	Sep 2008 – Jan 2009	limited series	
Secret Invasion (2008)	Inhumans	#1–4	Oct 2008 – Jan 2009	limited series	
Secret Invasion (2008)	Requiem	#1	Jan 2009	one-shot	
Secret Invasion (2008)	Runaways/Young Avengers	#1–3	Aug 2009 – Nov 2009	limited series	
Secret Invasion (2008)	Saga	#1	Mar 2008	one-shot	
Secret Invasion (2008)	The Amazing Spider-Man	#1–3	Oct 2008 – Dec 2008	limited series	
Secret Invasion (2008)	Thor	#1–3	Oct 2008 – Dec 2008	limited series	
Secret Invasion (2008)	War of Kings	#1	Mar 2009	one-shot	
Secret Invasion (2008)	Who Do You Trust?	#1	Aug 2008	one-shot	
Secret Invasion (2008)	X-Men	#1–4	Oct 2008 – Jan 2009	limited series	
Secret Invasion (2022)		#1–5	Jan 2023 – May 2023	limited series	
Secret Invasion Aftermath: Beta Ray Bill – The Green of Eden		#1	Jun 2009	one-shot	
Secret War		#1–5	Apr 2004 – Dec 2005	limited series	
Secret War	From the Files of Nick Fury	#1	Jul 2005	one-shot	
Secret Warps	Arachknight	Annual #1	Sep 2019	one-shot	
Secret Warps	Ghost Panther	Annual #1	Sep 2019	one-shot	
Secret Warps	Iron Hammer	Annual #1	Sep 2019	one-shot	
Secret Warps	Soldier Supreme	Annual #1	Sep 2019	one-shot	
Secret Warps	Weapon Hex	Annual #1	Sep 2019	one-shot	
Secret Warriors	vol. 1	#1–28	Apr 2009 – Sep 2011	Dark Reign tie-in initially; continued as on-going series	
Secret Warriors	vol. 2	#1–12	Jul 2017 – Mar 2018	Secret Empire tie-in initially; continued as on-going series	
Secret Wars		#1–9	Jul 2015 – Mar 2016	limited series	
Secret Wars	2099	#1–5	Jul 2015 – Nov 2015	limited series	
Secret Wars	Agents of Atlas	#1	Dec 2015	one-shot	
Secret Wars	Battleworld	#1–4	Jul 2015 – Oct 2015	limited series	
Secret Wars	Journal	#1–5	Jul 2015 – Nov 2015	limited series	
Secret Wars	Official Guide to the Marvel Multiverse	#1	Dec 2015	one-shot	
Secret Wars	Secret Love	#1	Oct 2015	one-shot	
Secret Wars	Too	#1	Jan 2016	one-shot	
Secret Wars II		#1–9	Jul 1985 – Mar 1986	limited series	
Secret X-Men		#1	Apr 2022	one-shot	
Secrets of the House of M			Sep 2005	one-shot	
Sectaurs		#1–8	Jun 1985 – Sep 1986		
Seeker 3000		#1–4	Jun 1998 – Sep 1998	limited series	
Semper Fi		#1–9	Dec 1988 – Aug 1989		
The Sensational She-Hulk	vol. 1	#1–60	May 1989 – Feb 1994		
The Sensational She-Hulk	vol. 2	#1–10	Dec 2023 – Oct 2024		
The Sensational She-Hulk	Ceremony	#1–2	1989	limited series	
The Sensational Spider-Man	vol. 1	#0–33 -1	Jan 1996 – Nov 1998		
The Sensational Spider-Man	vol. 1	#33.1–33.2	Oct 2012		
The Sensational Spider-Man	vol. 1	'96	Nov 1996	Annual	
The Sensational Spider-Man	vol. 2	#23–41	Apr 2006 – Dec 2007	continued from Marvel Knights Spider-Man vol. 1	
The Sensational Spider-Man	vol. 2	Annual #1	2007		
The Sensational Spider-Man	Self-Improvement	#1	Oct 2019	one-shot	
Sense & Sensibility		#1–5	Jul 2010 – Nov 2010	limited series	
Sentinel	vol. 1	#1–12	Jun 2003 – Apr 2004		
Sentinel	vol. 2	#1–5	Jan 2006 – May 2006	limited series	
Sentinel Squad O*N*E		#1–5	Mar 2006 – Jul 2006	limited series; Decimation tie-in	
Sentinels		#1–5	Dec 2024 – Apr 2025	limited series	
Sentry	vol. 1	#1–5	Sep 2000 – Jan 2001	limited series; titled "The Sentry"	
Sentry	vol. 2	#1–8	Nov 2005 – Jun 2006	limited series	
Sentry	vol. 3	#1–5	Aug 2018 – Dec 2018	limited series	
Sentry	vol. 4	#1–4	Feb 2024 – May 2024	limited series	
Sentry	vol. 5	#1–4	May 2026 – Aug 2026	limited series	
Sentry	Fallen Sun	#1	Jul 2010	one-shot	
The Sentry/	Fantastic Four	#1	Feb 2001	one-shot	
The Sentry/	Hulk	#1	Feb 2001	one-shot	
The Sentry/	Spider-Man	#1	Feb 2001	one-shot	
The Sentry/	The Void	#1	Feb 2001	one-shot	
The Sentry/	X-Men	#1	Feb 2001	one-shot	
Sergio Aragonés Massacres Marvel		#1	Jun 1996	one-shot	
Sex, Lies and Mutual Funds of the Yuppies From Hell		#1	Jan 1992	one-shot	
Sgt. Fury		#1–120	May 1963 – Jun 1974	continued as Sgt. Fury and his Howling Commandos	
Sgt. Fury		Annual #1–7	1965 – 1971		
Sgt. Fury and his Howling Commandos	vol. 1	#121–167	Sep 1974 – Dec 1981	continued from Sgt. Fury	
Sgt. Fury and his Howling Commandos	vol. 2	#1	Jul 2009	one-shot	
Shadow Riders		#1–4	Jun 1993 – Sep 1993	limited series	
Shadowland		#1–5	Sep 2010 – Jan 2011	limited series	
Shadowland	After the Fall	#1	Feb 2011	one-shot	
Shadowland	Blood on the Streets	#1–4	Oct 2010 – Jan 2011	limited series	
Shadowland	Bullseye	#1	Oct 2010	one-shot	
Shadowland	Daughters of the Shadow	#1–3	Oct 2010 – Dec 2010	limited series	
Shadowland	Elektra	#1	Nov 2010	one-shot	
Shadowland	Ghost Rider	#1	Nov 2010	one-shot	
Shadowland	Moon Knight	#1–3	Oct 2010 – Dec 2010	limited series	
Shadowland	Power Man	#1–4	Oct 2010 – Jan 2011	limited series	
Shadowland	Spider-Man	#1	Dec 2010	one-shot	
Shadowmasters		#1–4	Oct 1989 – Jan 1990	limited series	
Shadows & Light		#1–3	Feb 1998 – Jul 1998	limited series	
Shame Itself		#1	Jan 2012	one-shot	
Shang-Chi	vol. 1	#1–5	Nov 2020 – Mar 2021	limited series	
Shang-Chi	vol. 2	#1–12	Jul 2021 – Jul 2022		
Shang-Chi and the Ten Rings		#1–6	Sep 2022 – Feb 2023	concluded as Shang-Chi: Master of the Ten Rings	
Shang-Chi: Master of Kung Fu	vol. 1	#1–6	Nov 2002 – Apr 2003	limited series	
Shang-Chi: Master of Kung Fu	vol. 2	#1	Nov 2009	one-shot	
Shang-Chi: Master of the Ten Rings		#1	Mar 2023	one-shot; continued from Shang-Chi and the Ten Rings	
Shanna the She-Devil	vol. 1	#1–5	Dec 1972 – Aug 1973		
Shanna the She-Devil	vol. 2	#1–7	Apr 2005 – Oct 2005	limited series	
Shanna the She-Devil	Survival of the Fittest	#1–4	Oct 2007 – Jan 2008	limited series	
Shatterstar		#1–5	Dec 2018 – Apr 2019	limited series	
She-Hulk	vol. 1	#1–12	May 2004 – Apr 2005		
She-Hulk	vol. 2	#1–38	Dec 2005 – Apr 2009		
She-Hulk	vol. 3	#1–12	Apr 2014 – Apr 2015		
She-Hulk	vol. 4	#159–163	Jan 2018 – May 2018	continued from Hulk vol. 5; numbering continued from The Savage She-Hulk vol. 1	
She-Hulk	vol. 5	#1–15	Mar 2022 – Sep 2023		
She-Hulk	Annual	#1	Oct 2019	one-shot	
She-Hulk	Cosmic Collision	#1	Feb 2009	one-shot	
She-Hulk	Sensational	#1	May 2010	one-shot	
She-Hulks		#1–4	Jan 2011 – Apr 2011	limited series	
Sheena		#1–2	Dec 1984 – Feb 1985	limited series; adaptation of the 1984 film	
Shi/Daredevil: Honor Thy Mother		#1	Jan 1997	one-shot; co-published with Crusade Comics	
S.H.I.E.L.D.	vol. 1	#1–5	Feb 1973 – Oct 1973	titled SHIELD without the periods; also known as Nick Fury and His Agents of SHIELD	
S.H.I.E.L.D.	vol. 2	#1–6	Jun 2010 – Apr 2011		
S.H.I.E.L.D.	vol. 3	#1–6	Aug 2011 – Feb 2018	six-year delay between issues 4 & 5	
S.H.I.E.L.D.	vol. 4	#1–12	Feb 2015 – Jan 2016		
S.H.I.E.L.D.	Infinity	#∞	Jun 2011	one-shot connecting vols. 2 & 3	
Shogun Warriors		#1–20	Feb 1979 – Sep 1980		
The Shroud		#1–4	Mar 1994 – Jun 1994	limited series	
Shuri		#1–10	Dec 2018 – Sep 2019		
Siege	vol. 1	#1–4	Mar 2010 – Jun 2010	limited series	
Siege	vol. 2	#1–4	Sep 2015 – Dec 2015	limited series; Secret Wars (2015) tie-in	
Siege	Captain America	#1	Jun 2010	one-shot	
Siege	Embedded	#1–4	Mar 2010 – Jul 2010	limited series	
Siege	Loki	#1	Jun 2010	one-shot	
Siege	Secret Warriors	#1	Jun 2010	one-shot	
Siege	Spider-Man	#1	Jun 2010	one-shot	
Siege	Storming Asgard - Heroes & Villains	#1	Mar 2010	one-shot	
Siege	The Cabal	#1	Feb 2010	one-shot	
Siege	Young Avengers	#1	Jun 2010	one-shot	
Sif		#1	Jun 2010	one-shot	
Silent War		#1–6	Mar 2007 – Aug 2007	limited series	
Silk	vol. 1	#1–7	Apr 2015 – Nov 2015		
Silk	vol. 2	#1–19	Jan 2016 – Jun 2017		
Silk	vol. 3	#1–5	May 2021 – Oct 2021	limited series	
Silk	vol. 4	#1–5	Mar 2022 – Jul 2022	limited series	
Silk	vol. 5	#1–5	Jul 2023 – Nov 2023	limited series	
Silver Sable and the Wild Pack		#1–35	Jun 1992 – Apr 1995		
Silver Sable and the Wild Pack		#36	Jan 2018	one-shot; part of Marvel Legacy event	
Silver Surfer	vol. 1	#1–18	Aug 1968 – Sep 1970		
Silver Surfer	vol. 2	#1	Jun 1982	one-shot	
Silver Surfer	vol. 3	#1–146 -1	Jul 1987 – Nov 1998		
Silver Surfer	vol. 3	'97	1997	Annual	
Silver Surfer	vol. 3	Silver Surfer/Thor '98	1998	Annual	
Silver Surfer	vol. 3	Annual #1–7	1988 – 1994		
Silver Surfer	vol. 4	#1–14	Sep 2003 – Dec 2004		
Silver Surfer	vol. 5	#1–5	Apr 2011 – Aug 2011	limited series	
Silver Surfer	vol. 6	#1–15	May 2014 – Jan 2016		
Silver Surfer	vol. 7	#1–14	Mar 2016 – Dec 2017		
Silver Surfer	vol. 8	Annual #1	Nov 2018	one-shot	
Silver Surfer	Black	#1–5	Aug 2019 – Dec 2019	limited series	
Silver Surfer	Dangerous Artifacts	#1	Jun 1996	one-shot	
Silver Surfer	Ghost Light	#1–5	Apr 2023 – Aug 2023	limited series	
Silver Surfer	In Thy Name	#1–4	Jan 2008 – Apr 2008	limited series	
Silver Surfer	Loftier Than Mortals	#1–2	Oct 1999 – Nov 1999	limited series	
Silver Surfer	Parable	#1–2	Dec 1988 – Jan 1989	limited series; also known as The Silver Surfer	
Silver Surfer	Requiem	#1–4	Jul 2007 – Oct 2007	limited series	
Silver Surfer	The Ultimate Cosmic Experience!		1978	graphic novel; co-published with Fireside Books	
Silver Surfer/	Superman	#1	Nov 1996	one-shot; co-published with DC	
Silver Surfer/	Warlock: Resurrection	#1–4	Mar 1993 – Jun 1993	limited series	
Silver Surfer/	Weapon Zero	#1	Apr 1997	one-shot; co-published with Top Cow Productions and Image Comics	
Silver Surfer: Rebirth		#1–5	Mar 2022 – Aug 2022	limited series	
Silver Surfer: Rebirth	Legacy	#1–5	Nov 2023 – Mar 2024	limited series	
Silver Surfer vs. Dracula		#1	Feb 1994	one-shot	
Sinister War		#1–4	Sep 2021 – Nov 2021	limited series	
Sinister's Six		#1–3	Dec 2025 – Feb 2026	limited series; Age of Revelation tie-in	
Sins of Sinister		#1	Mar 2023	one-shot	
Sins of Sinister	Dominion	#1	Jun 2023	one-shot	
Six Guns		#1–5	Jan 2012 – Apr 2012	limited series	
Skaar	King of the Savage Land	#1–5	Jun 2011 – Sep 2011	limited series	
Skaar	Son of Hulk	#1–12	Aug 2008 – Aug 2009	continued as Son of Hulk	
Skaar	Son of Hulk Presents - Savage World of Sakaar	#1	Nov 2008	one-shot	
Skeleton Warriors		#1–4	Apr 1995 – Jul 1995	limited series	
Skrull Kill Krew	vol. 1	#1–5	Sep 1995 – Jan 1996	limited series	
Skrull Kill Krew	vol. 2	#1–5	Jun 2009 – Dec 2009	limited series; Dark Reign tie-in	
Skrulls!		#1	Jul 2008	one-shot; Secret Invasion tie-in	
Skrulls vs. Power Pack		#1–4	Sep 2008 – Dec 2008	limited series	
Skull the Slayer		#1–8	Aug 1975 – Nov 1976		
Sky Doll		#1–3	May 2008 – Jul 2008	limited series	
Sky Doll	Doll's Factory	#1–2	Jan 2010 – Feb 2010	limited series	
Sky Doll	Lacrima Christi Collection	#1–2	Sep 2010 – Oct 2010	limited series	
Sky Doll	Space Ship	#1–2	Jul 2010 – Aug 2010	limited series	
Slapstick	vol. 1	#1–4	Nov 1992 – Feb 1993	limited series	
Slapstick	vol. 2	#1–6	Feb 2017 – Jul 2017	limited series	
Sledge Hammer!		#1–2	Feb 1988 – Mar 1988	based on the TV series	
Sleepwalker		#1–33	Jun 1991 – Feb 1994		
Sleepwalker		Holiday Special #1	Jan 1993		
Slingers		#1–12	Dec 1998 – Nov 1998		
Smurfs		#1–3	Dec 1982 – Feb 1983		
Snow White		#1	Jan 1995	one-shot; also known as Walt Disney's Snow White and the Seven Dwarfs	
Solarman		#1–2	Jan 1989 – May 1990		
Soldier X		#1–12	Sep 2002 – Aug 2003		
Solo	vol. 1	#1–4	Sep 1994 – Dec 1994	limited series	
Solo	vol. 2	#1–5	Dec 2016 – Apr 2017	limited series	
Solo: A Star Wars Story Adaptation		#1–7	Dec 2018 – Jun 2019	limited series; film tie-in	
Solo Avengers		#1–20	Dec 1987 – Jul 1989	continued as Avengers Spotlight	
Solomon Kane		#1–6	Sep 1985 – Jul 1986	limited series	
Son of Hulk		#13–17	Sep 2009 – Jan 2010	continued from Skaar: Son of Hulk	
Son of M		#1–6	Feb 2006 – Jul 2006	limited series; Decimation tie-in	
Son of Satan		#1–8	Dec 1975 – Feb 1977		
Son of Yuppies from Hell			1990	one-shot	
Sorcerer Supreme		#1–10	Feb 2026 – Nov 2026		
Soviet Super-Soldiers		#1	Nov 1992	one-shot	
Space: Punisher		#1–4	Sep 2012 – Dec 2012	limited series	
Spaceknights		#1–5	Oct 2000 – Feb 2001	limited series	
Special Edition X-Men		#1	Feb 1983	one-shot	
Special Marvel Edition		#1–16	Jan 1971 – Feb 1974	continued as Master of Kung Fu vol. 1	
Spectacular Scarlet Spider		#1–2	Nov 1995 – Dec 1995	limited series	
Spectacular Spider-Girl		#1–4	Jul 2010 – Oct 2010	limited series	
Spectacular Spider-Man	vol. 1	#1–2	Jul 1968 – Nov 1968		
Spectacular Spider-Man	vol. 2	#1–263	Dec 1976 – Nov 1998	also known as Peter Parker, The Spectacular Spider-Man	
Spectacular Spider-Man	vol. 2	Annual #1–14	1979 – 1994	also known as Peter Parker, The Spectacular Spider-Man	
Spectacular Spider-Man	vol. 2	Super Special #1	Sep 1995	also known as Peter Parker, The Spectacular Spider-Man	
Spectacular Spider-Man	vol. 3	#1–27	Sep 2003 – Jun 2005		
Spectacular Spider-Man	vol. 4	#1000	Jun 2011	one-shot	
Spectacular Spider-Man	Brand New Day	#1–5	Jul 2026 – Nov 2026	limited series	
The Spectacular Spider-Men		#1–15	May 2024 – Jul 2025		
Speed Demon		#1	Apr 1996	One-shot; published under the Amalgam Comics imprint in association with DC	
Speedball		#1–10	Sep 1988 – Jun 1989		
Spellbinders		#1–6	May 2005 – Oct 2005	limited series	
Spellbound	vol. 2	#1–6	Jan 1988 – Apr 1988	limited series vol 1 was published by Atlas Comics	
Spider-Boy		#1–20	Jan 2024 – Aug 2025		
Spider-Boy		Annual #1	2024		
Spider-Boy [Amalgam Comics]		#1	Apr 1996	One-shot; published under the Amalgam Comics imprint in association with DC	
Spider-Boy Team-Up		#1	Jun 1997	One-shot; published under the Amalgam Comics imprint in association with DC	
Spider-Force		#1–3	Dec 2018 – Feb 2019	limited series; Spider-Geddon tie-in	
Spider-Geddon	vol. 1	#0–5	Nov 2018 – Jan 2019	limited series	
Spider-Geddon	Handbook	#1	Feb 2019	one-shot	
Spider-Girl	vol. 1	#0–100	Oct 1998 – Sep 2006		
Spider-Girl	vol. 1	1999	1999	Annual	
Spider-Girl	vol. 2	#1–8	Jan 2011 – Sep 2011		
Spider-Girl	vol. 3	#1–7	Aug 2025 – Feb 2026		
Spider-Girl	Battlebook: Streets of Fire		Nov 1998	one-shot	
Spider-Girl	The End!	#1	Oct 2010	one-shot	
Spider-Girls		#1–3	Dec 2018 – Feb 2019	limited series; Spider-Geddon tie-in	
Spider-Gwen	vol. 1	#1–5	Apr 2015 – Aug 2015		
Spider-Gwen	vol. 2	#0–34	Dec 2015 – Sep 2018		
Spider-Gwen	vol. 2	Annual #1	2016		
Spider-Gwen	vol. 3	Annual #1	2023	one-shot	
Spider-Gwen	Ghost-Spider	#1–10	Dec 2018 – Sep 2019	Spider-Geddon tie-in initially; continued as on-going series	
Spider-Gwen	Gwenverse	#1–5	May 2022 – Oct 2022	limited series	
Spider-Gwen	Shadow Clones	#1–5	May 2023 – Sep 2023	limited series	
Spider-Gwen	Smash	#1–4	Feb 2024 – May 2024	limited series	
Spider-Gwen	The Ghost-Spider	#1–15	Jul 2024 – Sep 2025		
Spider-Ham		#1–5	Feb 2020 – Aug 2020	limited series	
Spider-Ham 25th Anniversary Special		#1	Aug 2010	one-shot	
Spider-Island		#1–5	Sep 2015 – Dec 2015	limited series; Secret Wars (2015) tie-in	
Spider-Island	Cloak & Dagger	#1–3	Oct 2011 – Dec 2011	limited series	
Spider-Island	Deadly Foes	#1	Oct 2011	one-shot	
Spider-Island	Deadly Hands of Kung Fu	#1–3	Oct 2011 – Dec 2011	limited series	
Spider-Island	Emergence of Evil - Jackal & Hobgoblin	#1	Oct 2011	one-shot	
Spider-Island	Heroes for Hire	#1	Dec 2011	one-shot	
Spider-Island	I Love New York City	#1	Nov 2011	one-shot	
Spider-Island	Spider-Woman	#1	Nov 2011	one-shot	
Spider-Island	Spotlight		Sep 2011	one-shot	
Spider-Island	The Amazing Spider-Girl	#1–3	Oct 2011 – Dec 2011	limited series	
Spider-Island	The Avengers	#1	Nov 2011	one-shot	
Spider-Man	vol. 1	#1–98 -1	Aug 1990 – Dec 1998	also known as Peter Parker: Spider-Man beginning with issue #75	
Spider-Man	vol. 1	'97	1997	Annual	
Spider-Man	vol. 1	Holiday Special 1995	1995		
Spider-Man	vol. 1	Peter Parker: Spider-Man/Elektra '98	1998	Annual	
Spider-Man	vol. 1	Super Special #1	Jul 1995		
Spider-Man	vol. 2	#1–21	April 2016 – Dec 2017		
Spider-Man	vol. 3	#234–240	Jan 2018 – Jul 2018	numbering continued from Ultimate Spider-Man vol. 1	
Spider-Man	vol. 4	Annual #1	Oct 2018	one-shot	
Spider-Man	vol. 5	#1–5	Nov 2019 – Feb 2021	limited series	
Spider-Man	vol. 6	#1–11	Dec 2022 – Oct 2023		
Spider-Man	vol. 6	Annual #1	2023		
Spider-Man	'94	#1–5	Nov 2025 – Mar 2026	limited series	
Spider-Man	1602	#1–5	Dec 2009 – Apr 2010	limited series	
Spider-Man	Adventures	#1–15	Dec 1994 – Mar 1996	Based on the 1994 TV Series	
Spider-Man	Annual	#1	Aug 2019	one-shot; subtitled Peter Porker, The Spectacular Spider-Ham	
Spider-Man	Battlebook: Streets of Fire		1998	one-shot	
Spider-Man	Black and Blue and Read All Over	#1	Nov 2006	one-shot; also known as Spider-Man Special: Black and Blue and Read All Over	
Spider-Man	Black Suit & Blood	#1–4	Oct 2024 – Jan 2025	limited series	
Spider-Man	Blue	#1–6	Jul 2002 – Apr 2003	limited series	
Spider-Man	Brand New Day Yearbook	#1	2008	one-shot	
Spider-Man	Breakout	#1–5	Jun 2005 – Oct 2005	limited series	
Spider-Man	Carnage		Jun 1993	one-shot	
Spider-Man	Chapter One	#0–12	Dec 1998 – Oct 1999	limited series	
Spider-Man	Classics	#1–16	Apr 1993 – Jul 1994		
Spider-Man	Collectors' Preview	#1	Dec 1994	one-shot	
Spider-Man	Dead Man's Hand	#1	Apr 1997	one-shot	
Spider-Man	Death and Destiny	#1–3	Aug 2000 – Oct 2000	limited series	
Spider-Man	Enter the Spider-Verse	#1	Jan 2019	one-shot	
Spider-Man	Fairy Tales	#1–4	Jul 2007 – Oct 2007	limited series	
Spider-Man	Fear Itself	#1	Mar 2009	one-shot; also known as The Amazing Spider-Man: Fear Itself	
Spider-Man	Fever	#1–3	Jun 2010 – Aug 2010	limited series	
Spider-Man	Friends and Enemies	#1–4	Jan 1995 – Apr 1995	limited series	
Spider-Man	Funeral for an Octopus	#1–3	Mar 1995 – May 1995	limited series	
Spider-Man	Get Kraven	#1–6	Aug 2002 – Jan 2003	limited series	
Spider-Man	Giant-Size vol. 1	#1–6	Jul 1974 – 1975		
Spider-Man	Giant-Size vol. 2	#1	Jul 2014	one-shot	
Spider-Man	Grim Hunt -- The Kraven Saga		May 2010	one-shot	
Spider-Man	Hobgoblin Lives	#1–3	Jan 1997 – Apr 1997	limited series	
Spider-Man	Holiday Spectacular	#1	Jan 2026	one-shot	
Spider-Man	Homeroom Heroes	#1–4	Nov 2024 – Feb 2026		
Spider-Man	House of M	#1–5	Aug 2005 – Dec 2005	limited series	
Spider-Man	Legacy of Evil	#1	Jun 1996	one-shot	
Spider-Man	Legend of the Spider-Clan	#1–5	Dec 2002 – Apr 2003	limited series	
Spider-Man	Life Story	#1–6	May 2019 – Oct 2019	limited series	
Spider-Man	Life Story	Annual #1	2021		
Spider-Man	Lifeline	#1–3	Apr 2001 – Jun 2001	limited series	
Spider-Man	Long Way Home	#1–5	Aug 2026 – present	limited series	
Spider-Man	Made Men	#1	Aug 1998	one-shot	
Spider-Man	Master Plan	#1	Sep 2017	one-shot	
Spider-Man	Meals to Astonish	#1	May 2026	one-shot	
Spider-Man	Origin of the Hunter	#1	Jun 2010	one-shot	
Spider-Man	Power of Terror	#1–4	Jan 1995 – Apr 1995	limited series	
Spider-Man	Quality of Life	#1–4	Jul 2002 – Oct 2002	limited series	
Spider-Man	Redemption	#1–4	Sep 1996 – Dec 1996	limited series	
Spider-Man	Reptilian Rage	#1	Aug 2019	one-shot	
Spider-Man	Revenge of the Green Goblin	#1–3	Oct 2000 – Dec 2000	limited series	
Spider-Man	Shadow of the Green Goblin	#1–4	Jun 2024 – Sep 2024	limited series	
Spider-Man	Special Edition	#1	Nov 1992	one-shot; mail-order exclusive	
Spider-Man	Spectacular	#1	Aug 2014	one-shot	
Spider-Man	Spider's Shadow	#1–5	Jun 2021 – Oct 2021	limited series	
Spider-Man	Sweet Charity	#1	Aug 2002	one-shot	
Spider-Man	The Arachnis Project	#1–6	Aug 1994 – Jan 1995	limited series	
Spider-Man	The Clone Journal	#1	Mar 1995	one-shot	
Spider-Man	The Clone Saga	#1–6	Nov 2009 – Apr 2010	limited series	
Spider-Man	The Final Adventure	#1–4	Dec 1995 – Mar 1996	limited series	
Spider-Man	The Jackal Files	#1	Aug 1995	one-shot	
Spider-Man	The Lost Hunt	#1–5	Jan 2023 – May 2023	limited series	
Spider-Man	The Lost Years	#0–3	Aug 1995 – Jan 1996	limited series	
Spider-Man	The Mutant Agenda	#0–3	Feb 1992 – May 1994	limited series	
Spider-Man	The Official Movie Adaptation	#1	Jun 2002	one-shot; adaptation of the 2002 film	
Spider-Man	The Osborn Journal	#1	Feb 1997	one-shot	
Spider-Man	The Parker Years	#1	Nov 1995	one-shot	
Spider-Man	The Short Halloween	#1	Jul 2009	one-shot; also known as The Amazing Spider-Man: The Short Halloween	
Spider-Man	The Venom Agenda	#1	Jan 1998	one-shot	
Spider-Man	Universe	#1–21	Mar 2000 – Oct 2001		
Spider-Man	Unmasked	#1	Dec 1996	one-shot	
Spider-Man	Web of Doom	#1–3	Aug 1994 – Oct 1994	limited series	
Spider-Man	With Great Power...	#1–5	Mar 2008 – Sep 2008	limited series	
Spider-Man	With Great Power Comes Great Responsibility	#1–7	Jun 2011 – Dec 2011		
Spider-Man/	Badrock	#1A–B	Mar 1997	one-shot; co-published with Maximum Press	
Spider-Man/	Black Cat: The Evil That Men Do	#1–6	Aug 2002 – Mar 2006	limited series; three-year gap between publication of issues 3 & 4	
Spider-Man/	Daredevil	#1	Oct 2002	one-shot	
Spider-Man/	Deadpool	#1–50 1.MU	Mar 2016 – Jul 2019		
Spider-Man/	Doctor Octopus: Out of Reach	#1–5	Jan 2004 – May 2004	limited series	
Spider-Man/	Doctor Octopus: Year One	#1–5	Aug 2004 – Dec 2004	limited series	
Spider-Man/	Dr. Strange: The Way to Dusty Death		1992	one-shot	
Spider-Man/	Fantastic Four	#1–4	Sep 2010 – Dec 2010	limited series	
Spider-Man/	Gen13		Nov 1996	one-shot; co-published with Image Comics	
Spider-Man/	Hulk: Fire and Brimstone	#1–4	Oct 2026 – present	limited series	
Spider-Man/	Human Torch	#1–5	Mar 2005 – Jul 2005	limited series	
Spider-Man/	Punisher: Family Plot	#1–2	Feb 1996	limited series	
Spider-Man/	Red Sonja	#1–5	Oct 2007 – Feb 2008	limited series; co-published with Dynamite Entertainment	
Spider-Man 2		#1	Aug 2004	one-shot; movie adaptation	
Spider-Man 3 Movie Prequel			Jun 2007	one-shot; movie tie-in	
Spider-Man 2099	vol. 1	#1–46	Nov 1992 – Aug 1996		
Spider-Man 2099	vol. 1	Annual #1	1994		
Spider-Man 2099	vol. 1	Special #1	Nov 1995		
Spider-Man 2099	vol. 2	#1–12	Sep 2014 – Jul 2015		
Spider-Man 2099	vol. 3	#1–25	Dec 2015 – Sep 2017		
Spider-Man 2099	vol. 4	#1	Feb 2020	one-shot	
Spider-Man 2099	Dark Genesis	#1–5	Jul 2023	weekly limited series	
Spider-Man 2099	Meets Spider-Man		Nov 1995	one-shot	
Spider-Man 2099: Exodus		#1–5	Jul 2022 – Oct 2022	limited series	
Spider-Man 2099: Exodus	Alpha	#1	Jul 2022	one-shot	
Spider-Man 2099: Exodus	Omega	#1	Nov 2022	one-shot	
Spider-Man and (&)	Araña Special: The Hunter Revealed	#1	May 2006	one-shot	
Spider-Man and (&)	Batman		Sep 1995	one-shot; co-published with DC	
Spider-Man and (&)	Daredevil Special Edition	#1	Mar 1984	one-shot	
Spider-Man and (&)	His Amazing Friends	#1	Dec 1981	one-shot; based on the 1980s animated TV show	
Spider-Man and (&)	Mysterio	#1–3	Jan 2001 – Mar 2001	limited series; also known as Spider-Man: The Mysterio Manifesto	
Spider-Man and (&)	Power Pack	#1–4	Jan 2007 – Apr 2007	limited series	
Spider-Man and (&)	The Fantastic Four	#1–4	Jun 2007 – Sep 2007	limited series	
Spider-Man and (&)	The Human Torch in... Bahia De Los Muertos!	#1	May 2009	one-shot	
Spider-Man and (&)	The Secret Wars	#1–4	Jan 2010 – May 2010	limited series	
Spider-Man and (&)	The X-Men	#1–6	Feb 2015 – Jun 2015	limited series	
Spider-Man and (&)	Venom: Double Trouble	#1–4	Jan 2020 – Apr 2020	limited series	
Spider-Man and (&)	Wolverine vol. 1	#1–4	Aug 2003 – Nov 2003	limited series	
Spider-Man and (&)	Wolverine vol. 2	#1–10	Jul 2025 – Apr 2026		
Spider-Man and (&)	X-Factor: Shadowgames	#1–3	May 1994 – Jul 1994	limited series	
Spider-Man Family	vol. 1	#1	Dec 2005	one-shot	
Spider-Man Family	vol. 2	#1–9	Apr 2007 – Aug 2008		
Spider-Man Family	Featuring Spider-Clan	#1	Jan 2007	one-shot	
Spider-Man Family	Featuring Spider-Man's Amazing Friends	#1	Oct 2006	one-shot	
Spider-Man: India	vol. 1	#1–4	Jan 2005 – Apr 2005	limited series	
Spider-Man: India	vol. 2	#1–5	Aug 2023 – Dec 2023	limited series	
Spider-Man Loves Mary Jane		#1–20	Feb 2006 – Sep 2007		
Spider-Man Loves Mary Jane	Season 2	#1–5	Oct 2008 – Feb 2009		
Spider-Man: Maximum Clonage	Alpha	#1	Aug 1995	one-shot	
Spider-Man: Maximum Clonage	Omega	#1	Aug 1995	one-shot	
Spider-Man Noir	vol. 1	#1–4	Feb 2009 – May 2009	limited series	
Spider-Man Noir	vol. 2	#1–5	May 2020 – Dec 2020	limited series	
Spider-Man Noir	vol. 3	#1–5	Dec 2025 – Apr 2026	limited series	
Spider-Man Noir	Eyes Without a Face	#1–4	Feb 2010 – May 2010	limited series	
Spider-Man, Punisher, Sabretooth: Designer Genes			1993	graphic novel	
Spider-Man: Reign		#1–4	Feb 2007 – May 2007	limited series	
Spider-Man: Reign	2	#1–5	Sep 2024 – Jan 2025	limited series	
Spider-Man Saga	vol. 1	#1–4	Nov 1991 – Feb 1992	limited series	
Spider-Man Saga	vol. 2		Dec 2010	one-shot	
Spider-Man Team-Up	vol.1	#1–7	Dec 1995 – Jun 1997		
Spider-Man Team-Up	vol. 2	Special #1	May 2005	one-shot	
Spider-Man Unlimited	vol. 1	#1–22	May 1993 – Nov 1998		
Spider-Man Unlimited	vol. 2	#1–5	Dec 1999 – Apr 2000	based on the 1999 TV series	
Spider-Man Unlimited	vol. 3	#1–15	Mar 2004 – Jul 2006		
Spider-Man vs.	Dracula	#1	Jul 1994	one-shot	
Spider-Man vs.	Punisher	#1	Jul 2000	one-shot	
Spider-Man vs.	The Sinister Sixteen	#1	Sep 2025	one-shot	
Spider-Man vs.	Vampires	#1	Dec 2010	one-shot	
Spider-Man vs.	Wolverine	#1	Feb 1987	one-shot	
Spider-Man's Tangled Web		#5–22	Oct 2001 – Mar 2003	continued from Tangled Web: The Thousand	
Spider-Men		#1–5	Aug 2012 – Nov 2012	limited series	
Spider-Men	II	#1–5	Sep 2017 – Feb 2018	limited series	
Spider-Punk		#1–5	Jun 2022 – Nov 2022	limited series	
Spider-Punk	Arms Race	#1–4	Apr 2024 – Jul 2024	limited series	
Spider-Society		#1–4	Oct 2024 – Jan 2025	limited series	
Spider-Verse	vol. 1	#1–2	Jan 2015 – Mar 2015	limited series	
Spider-Verse	vol. 2	#1–5	Jul 2015 – Nov 2015	limited series; Secret Wars (2015) tie-in	
Spider-Verse	vol. 3	#1–6	Dec 2019 – May 2020	limited series	
Spider-Verse	Team-Up	#1–3	Jan 2015 – Mar 2015	limited series	
Spider-Verse vs. Venomverse		#1–5	Jul 2025 – Nov 2025	limited series	
Spider-Woman	vol. 1	#1–50	Apr 1978 – Jun 1983		
Spider-Woman	vol. 2	#1–4	Nov 1993 – Feb 1994	limited series	
Spider-Woman	vol. 3	#1–18	Jul 1999 – Dec 2000		
Spider-Woman	vol. 4	#1–7	Nov 2009 – May 2010		
Spider-Woman	vol. 5	#1–10	Jan 2015 – Oct 2015		
Spider-Woman	vol. 6	#1–17	Jan 2016 – May 2017		
Spider-Woman	vol. 7	#1–21	May 2020 – May 2022		
Spider-Woman	vol. 8	#1–10	Jan 2024 – Oct 2024		
Spider-Woman	vol. 9	#1–	Jan 2027 – present		
Spider-Woman	50th Anniversary Special	#1	Nov 2026		
Spider-Woman	Giant-Size	#1	Sep 2005	one-shot	
Spider-Woman	Origin	#1–5	Feb 2006 – Jun 2006	limited series	
Spider-Women	Alpha	#1	Jun 2016	one-shot	
Spider-Women	Omega	#1	Aug 2016	one-shot	
Spidey		#1–12	Feb 2016 – Jan 2017		
Spidey/Marrow		#1	Feb 2001	one-shot	
Spidey and His Amazing Friends		#1–	Oct 2024 – present		
Spidey and the Mini-Marvels		#1	May 2003	one-shot	
Spidey Sunday Spectacular!		#1	Jul 2011	one-shot	
Spidey Super Stories		#1–57	Oct 1974 – Mar 1982		
Spin Angels		#1–4	Aug 2009 – Dec 2009	limited series	
Spine-Tingling Spider-Man		#0–4	Nov 2023 – Mar 2024	limited series	
Spirits of Ghost Rider: Mother of Demons		#1	Apr 2020	one-shot	
Spirits of Vengeance	vol. 1	#1–5	Dec 2017 – Apr 2018	limited series	
Spirits of Vengeance	vol. 2	#1–6	Nov 2024 – Apr 2025	limited series	
Spirits of Vengeance	Spirit Rider	#1	Oct 2021	one-shot	
Spirits of Violence		#1–5	Dec 2025 – Apr 2026	limited series	
Spitfire		#1	Sep 2010	one-shot	
Spitfire and the Troubleshooters		#1–9	Oct 1986 – Jun 1987	continued as Codename: Spitfire	
Spoof		#1–5	Oct 1970 – May 1973	two-year publishing gap between issues 1 and 2	
Spotlight		#1–4	Sep 1978 – May 1979		
Squadron Sinister		#1–4	Aug 2015 – Jan 2016	limited series; Secret Wars (2015) tie-in	
Squadron Supreme	vol. 1	#1–12	Sep 1985 – Aug 1986	limited series	
Squadron Supreme	vol. 2	#1–7	May 2006 – Nov 2006		
Squadron Supreme	vol. 3	#1–12	Sep 2008 – Aug 2009		
Squadron Supreme	vol. 4	#1–15	Feb 2016 – Mar 2017		
Squadron Supreme	Hyperion vs. Nighthawk	#1–4	Mar 2007 – Jun 2007	limited series	
Squadron Supreme	New World Order	#1	Sep 1998	one-shot	
Stan Lee Meets...	Dr. Doom	#1	Dec 2006	one-shot	
Stan Lee Meets...	Dr. Strange	#1	Dec 2006	one-shot	
Stan Lee Meets...	Silver Surfer	#1	Jan 2007	one-shot	
Stan Lee Meets...	Spider-Man	#1	Nov 2006	one-shot	
Stan Lee Meets...	The Thing	#1	Dec 2006	one-shot	
The Stand	American Nightmares	#1–5	May 2009 – Oct 2009	limited series	
The Stand	Captain Trips	#1–5	Dec 2008 – Mar 2009	limited series	
The Stand	Hardcases	#1–5	Aug 2010 – Jan 2011	limited series	
The Stand	No Man's Land	#1–5	Apr 2011 – Aug 2011	limited series	
The Stand	Soul Survivors	#1–5	Dec 2009 – May 2010	limited series	
The Stand	The Night Has Come	#1–6	Oct 2011 – Mar 2012	limited series	
Star		#1–5	Mar 2020 – Nov 2020	limited series	
Star Brand		#1–19	Oct 1986 – May 1989		
Star Brand		Annual #1	Oct 1987		
Star-Lord	vol. 1	Special Edition #1	Feb 1982	one-shot	
Star-Lord	vol. 2	#1–3	Dec 1996 – Feb 1997	limited series; titled Starlord	
Star-Lord	vol. 3	#1–8	Jan 2016 – Aug 2016		
Star-Lord	vol. 4	#1–6	Feb 2017 – Jun 2017		
Star-Lord	vol. 4	Annual #1	2017		
Star-Lord & Kitty Pryde		#1–3	Sep 2015 – Nov 2015	limited series; Secret Wars (2015) tie-in	
Star Trek		#1–18	Apr 1980 – Feb 1982		
Star Trek	Deep Space Nine	#1–15	Nov 1996 – Mar 1998		
Star Trek	Early Voyages	#1–17	Feb 1997 – Jun 1998		
Star Trek	First Contact	#1	Nov 1996	one-shot; movie adaptation	
Star Trek	Mirror Mirror	#1	Feb 1997	one-shot	
Star Trek	Operation Assimilation	#1	Apr 1997	one-shot	
Star Trek	Starfleet Academy	#1–19	Dec 1996 – Jun 1998		
Star Trek	Telepathy War	#1	Nov 1997	one-shot	
Star Trek	The Next Generation: Riker	#1	Jul 1998	one-shot	
Star Trek	Unlimited	#1–10	Nov 1996 – Jul 1998		
Star Trek	Untold Voyages	#1–5	Mar 1998 – Jul 1998	limited series	
Star Trek	Voyager	#1–15	Nov 1996 – Mar 1998		
Star Trek	Voyager – Splashdown	#1–4	Apr 1998 – Jul 1998	limited series	
Star Trek/X-Men		#1	Dec 1996	one-shot	
Star Trek: The Next Generation/X-Men: Second Contact		#1	May 1998	one-shot	
Star Wars (Note: See also the following related series that have the Star Wars logo on their covers, but do not include "Star Wars" in their official titles: Chewbacca (2015); Darth Vader vol. 1 (2015); Darth Vader vol. 2 (2017); Han Solo (2016); Kanan/Kanan: The Last Padawan (2015); Lando (2015); Obi-Wan and Anakin (2016); Princess Leia (2015))	vol. 1	#1–107	Jul 1977 – Jul 1986		
Star Wars	vol. 1	#108	Jul 2019	one-shot	
Star Wars	vol. 1	Annual #1–3	1979 – 1983		
Star Wars	vol. 2	#1–75	Mar 2015 – Jan 2020		
Star Wars	vol. 2	Annual #1–4	2016 – 2019		
Star Wars	vol. 3	#1–50	Mar 2020 – Nov 2024		
Star Wars	vol. 4	#1–10	Jul 2025 – Apr 2026		
Star Wars	A New Legacy	#1	Mar 2025	one-shot	
Star Wars	Ahsoka	#1–8	Sep 2024 – Apr 2025	limited series; television series adaptation	
Star Wars	Beckett	#1	Oct 2018	one-shot	
Star Wars	Boba Fett – Black, White & Red	#1–4	Nov 2025 – Feb 2026	limited series	
Star Wars	Bounty Hunters	#1–42	May 2020 – Mar 2024		
Star Wars	C-3PO	#1	Jun 2016	one-shot; also known as Star Wars Special: C-3PO	
Star Wars	Crimson Reign	#1–5	Feb 2022 – Aug 2022	limited series	
Star Wars	Darth Maul	#1–5	Apr 2017 – Sep 2017	limited series	
Star Wars	Darth Maul - Black, White & Red	#1–4	Jun 2024 – Sep 2024	limited series	
Star Wars	Darth Vader	#1–50	Apr 2020 – Nov 2024		
Star Wars	Darth Vader - Black, White & Red	#1–4	Jun 2023 – Sep 2023	limited series	
Star Wars	Droids Unplugged	#1	Aug 2017	one-shot	
Star Wars	Empire Ascendant	#1	Feb 2020	one-shot	
Star Wars	Ewoks	#1–4	Dec 2024 – Mar 2025	limited series	
Star Wars	Han Solo & Chewbacca	#1–10	May 2022 – May 2023		
Star Wars	Hidden Empire	#1–5	Jan 2023 – Jun 2023	limited series	
Star Wars	Inquisitors	#1–4	Sep 2024 – Dec 2024	limited series	
Star Wars	Jango Fett	#1–4	May 2024 – Aug 2024	limited series	
Star Wars	Jar Jar	#1	Apr 2026	one-shot	
Star Wars	Jedi Fallen Order - Dark Temple	#1–5	Nov 2019 – Feb 2020	limited series; video game tie-in	
Star Wars	Jedi Knights	#1–10	May 2025 – Feb 2026		
Star Wars	Lando - Double or Nothing	#1–5	Jul 2018 – Sep 2018	limited series	
Star Wars	Life Day	#1	Jan 2022	one-shot	
Star Wars	Phantom Menace 25th Anniversary Special	#1	Jul 2024	one-shot	
Star Wars	Poe Dameron	#1–31	Jun 2016 – Nov 2018		
Star Wars	Poe Dameron	Annual #1–2	2017 – 2018		
Star Wars	Saga	#1	Feb 2020	one-shot	
Star Wars	Sana Starros	#1–5	Apr 2023 – Aug 2023	limited series	
Star Wars	Shadow of Maul	#1–5	May 2026 – Sep 2026	limited series	
Star Wars	Tag & Bink Were Here	#1	Jul 2018	one-shot	
Star Wars	Target Vader	#1–6	Sep 2019 – Feb 2020	limited series	
Star Wars	The Acolyte - Kelnacca	#1	Nov 2024	one-shot	
Star Wars	The Book of Boba Fett	#1–7	Nov 2026 – present	limited series; television series adaptation	
Star Wars	The Fall of Kylo Ren	#1–5	Oct 2026 – present	limited series	
Star Wars	The Force Awakens	#1–6	Aug 2016 – Jan 2017	limited series; movie adaptation	
Star Wars	The Halcyon Legacy	#1–5	Apr 2022 – Oct 2022	limited series	
Star Wars	The Legacy of Vader	#1–12	Apr 2025 – Mar 2026	also known as Star Wars: Legacy of Vader	
Star Wars	The Rise of Kylo Ren	#1–4	Feb 2020 – May 2020	limited series	
Star Wars	The Rise of Skywalker Adaptation	#1–5	Apr 2025 – Aug 2025	limited series	
Star Wars	The Screaming Citadel	#1	Jul 2017	one-shot	
Star Wars	TIE Fighter	#1–5	Jun 2019 – Oct 2019	limited series	
Star Wars	Vader — Dark Visions	#1–5	May 2019 – Aug 2019	limited series	
Star Wars	Vader Down	#1	Jan 2016	one-shot	
Star Wars	Yoda	#1–10	Jan 2023 – Oct 2023	limited series	
Star Wars: Age of Rebellion	Boba Fett	#1	Jul 2019	one-shot	
Star Wars: Age of Rebellion	Darth Vader	#1	Aug 2019	one-shot	
Star Wars: Age of Rebellion	Grand Moff Tarkin	#1	Jun 2019	one-shot	
Star Wars: Age of Rebellion	Han Solo	#1	Jul 2019	one-shot	
Star Wars: Age of Rebellion	Jabba the Hutt	#1	Jul 2019	one-shot	
Star Wars: Age of Rebellion	Lando Calrissian	#1	Jul 2019	one-shot	
Star Wars: Age of Rebellion	Luke Skywalker	#1	Aug 2019	one-shot	
Star Wars: Age of Rebellion	Princess Leia	#1	Jun 2019	one-shot	
Star Wars: Age of Rebellion	Special	#1	Jun 2019	one-shot	
Star Wars: Age of Republic	Anakin Skywalker	#1	Apr 2019	one-shot	
Star Wars: Age of Republic	Count Dooku	#1	Apr 2019	one-shot	
Star Wars: Age of Republic	Darth Maul	#1	Feb 2019	one-shot	
Star Wars: Age of Republic	General Grievous	#1	May 2019	one-shot	
Star Wars: Age of Republic	Jango Fett	#1	Mar 2019	one-shot	
Star Wars: Age of Republic	Obi-Wan Kenobi	#1	Mar 2019	one-shot	
Star Wars: Age of Republic	Padmé Amidala	#1	May 2019	one-shot	
Star Wars: Age of Republic	Qui-Gon Jinn	#1	Feb 2019	one-shot	
Star Wars: Age of Republic	Special	#1	Mar 2019	one-shot	
Star Wars: Age of Resistance	Captain Phasma	#1	Sep 2019	one-shot	
Star Wars: Age of Resistance	Finn	#1	Sep 2019	one-shot	
Star Wars: Age of Resistance	General Hux	#1	Oct 2019	one-shot	
Star Wars: Age of Resistance	Kylo Ren	#1	Nov 2019	one-shot	
Star Wars: Age of Resistance	Poe Dameron	#1	Oct 2019	one-shot	
Star Wars: Age of Resistance	Rey	#1	Nov 2019	one-shot	
Star Wars: Age of Resistance	Rose Tico	#1	Nov 2019	one-shot	
Star Wars: Age of Resistance	Special	#1	Sep 2019	one-shot	
Star Wars: Age of Resistance	Supreme Leader Snoke	#1	Nov 2019	one-shot	
Star Wars: Battle of Jakku	Insurgency Rising	#1–4	Dec 2024 – Jan 2025	limited series	
Star Wars: Battle of Jakku	Last Stand	#1–4	Feb 2025 – Mar 2025	limited series	
Star Wars: Battle of Jakku	Republic Under Siege	#1–4	Jan 2025 – Feb 2025	limited series	
Star Wars: Dark Droids		#1–5	Oct 2023 – Feb 2024	limited series	
Star Wars: Dark Droids	D-Squad	#1–4	Nov 2023 – Feb 2024	limited series	
Star Wars: Doctor Aphra	vol. 1	#1–40	Feb 2017 – Feb 2020		
Star Wars: Doctor Aphra	vol. 1	Annual #1–3	2017 – 2019		
Star Wars: Doctor Aphra	vol. 2	#1–40	Jul 2020 – Mar 2024		
Star Wars: Doctor Aphra	Chaos Agent	#1–5	Aug 2025 – Dec 2025		
Star Wars: Galaxy's Edge		#1–5	Jun 2019 – Oct 2019	limited series	
Star Wars: Galaxy's Edge	Echoes of the Empire	#1–5	Jun 2026 – Oct 2026	limited series	
Star Wars: Han Solo	Hunt for the Falcon	#1–5	Nov 2025 – Mar 2026	limited series	
Star Wars: Han Solo	Imperial Cadet	#1–5	Jan 2019 – May 2019	limited series	
Star Wars: Mace Windu	vol. 1	#1–5	Oct 2017 – Feb 2018	limited series	
Star Wars: Mace Windu	vol. 2	#1–4	Apr 2024 – Jul 2024	limited series	
Star Wars: Obi-Wan Kenobi	vol. 1	#1–5	Jul 2022 – Nov 2022	limited series; also known as Star Wars: Obi-Wan	
Star Wars: Obi-Wan Kenobi	vol. 2	#1–6	Nov 2023 – May 2024	limited series; television series adaptation	
Star Wars: Return of the Jedi		#1–4	Oct 1983 – Jan 1984	limited series; movie adaptation	
Star Wars: Return of the Jedi	Ewoks	#1	Jun 2023	one-shot	
Star Wars: Return of the Jedi	Jabba's Palace	#1	May 2023	one-shot	
Star Wars: Return of the Jedi	Lando	#1	Jul 2023	one-shot	
Star Wars: Return of the Jedi	Max Rebo	#1	Oct 2023	one-shot	
Star Wars: Return of the Jedi	The 40th Anniversary Covers by Chris Sprouse	#1	Jan 2024	one-shot	
Star Wars: Return of the Jedi	The Empire	#1	Aug 2023	one-shot	
Star Wars: Return of the Jedi	The Rebellion	#1	Sep 2023	one-shot	
Star Wars: Revelations	vol. 1	#1	Jan 2023	one-shot	
Star Wars: Revelations	vol. 2	#1	Feb 2024	one-shot	
Star Wars: Rogue One		#1–6	Jun 2017 – Nov 2017	limited series; movie adaptation	
Star Wars: Rogue One	Cassian & K-2SO Special	#1	Oct 2017	one-shot	
Star Wars: Rogue One	Cassian Andor	#1	Jul 2026	one-shot	
Star Wars: Rogue One	Chirrut & Baze	#1	Dec 2026	one-shot	
Star Wars: Rogue One	Darth Vader	#1	Dec 2026	one-shot	
Star Wars: Rogue One	Jyn Erso	#1	Aug 2026	one-shot	
Star Wars: Rogue One	Saw Gerrera	#1	Sep 2026	one-shot	
Star Wars: The High Republic	vol. 1	#1–15	Mar 2021 – May 2022		
Star Wars: The High Republic	vol. 2	#1–10	Dec 2022 – Jul 2023		
Star Wars: The High Republic	vol. 3	#1–10	Jan 2024 – Oct 2024	limited series	
Star Wars: The High Republic	Eye of the Storm	#1–2	Mar 2022 – May 2022	limited series	
Star Wars: The High Republic	Fear of the Jedi	#1–5	Apr 2025 – Aug 2025	limited series	
Star Wars: The High Republic	Shadows of Starlight	#1–4	Dec 2023 – Mar 2024	limited series	
Star Wars: The High Republic	The Blade	#1–4	Feb 2023 – May 2023	limited series	
Star Wars: The High Republic	The Finale	#1	Sep 2025	one-shot	
Star Wars: The High Republic	Trail of Shadows	#1–5	Dec 2021 – Apr 2022	limited series	
Star Wars: The Last Jedi		#1–6	Jul 2018 – Dec 2018	limited series; movie adaptation	
Star Wars: The Last Jedi	DJ - Most Wanted	#1	Mar 2018	one-shot	
Star Wars: The Last Jedi	The Storms of Crait	#1	Feb 2018	one-shot	
Star Wars: The Mandalorian		#1–8	Sep 2022 – May 2023	limited series; television series adaptation	
Star Wars: The Mandalorian	Season Two	#1–8	Aug 2023 – Mar 2024	limited series; television series adaptation	
Star Wars: Thrawn		#1–6	Apr 2018 – Sep 2018	limited series	
Star Wars: Thrawn	Alliances	#1–4	Mar 2024 – Jun 2024	limited series	
Star Wars: Visions		#1	Dec 2022	one-shot	
Star Wars: Visions	Peach Momoko	#1	Jan 2024	one-shot	
Star Wars: Visions	Takashi Okazaki	#1	May 2024	one-shot	
Star Wars: War of the Bounty Hunters		#1–5	Aug 2021 – Dec 2021	limited series	
Star Wars: War of the Bounty Hunters	4-Lom & Zuckuss	#1	Oct 2021	one-shot	
Star Wars: War of the Bounty Hunters	Alpha	#1	Jul 2021	one-shot	
Star Wars: War of the Bounty Hunters	Boushh	#1	Nov 2021	one-shot	
Star Wars: War of the Bounty Hunters	IG-88	#1	Dec 2021	one-shot	
Star Wars: War of the Bounty Hunters	Jabba The Hutt	#1	Sep 2021	one-shot	
Starblast		#1–4	Jan 1994 – Apr 1994	limited series	
Starbrand and Nightmask		#1–6	Feb 2016 – Jul 2016	limited series	
Starjammers	vol. 1	#1–4	Oct 1995 – Jan 1996	limited series	
Starjammers	vol. 2	#1–6	Sep 2004 – Jan 2005	limited series	
Starmasters		#1–3	Dec 1995 – Feb 1996	limited series	
Starr the Slayer		#1–4	Nov 2009 – Feb 2010	limited series	
Starriors		#1–4	Nov 1984 – Feb 1985	limited series	
Startling Stories	Banner	#1–4	Jul 2001 – Oct 2001	limited series	
Startling Stories	Fantastic Four – Unstable Molecules	#1–4	Mar 2003 – Jun 2003	limited series	
Startling Stories	The Megalomaniacal Spider-Man	#1	Jun 2002	one-shot	
Startling Stories	The Thing	#1	2003	one-shot	
Startling Stories	The Thing – Night Falls on Yancy Street	#1–4	Jun 2003 – Sep 2003	limited series	
Steeltown Rockers		#1–6	Apr 1990 – Sep 1990	limited series	
Stephen King's N.		#1–4	May 2010 – Aug 2010	limited series	
Steve Rogers: Super-Soldier		#1–4	Sep 2010 – Dec 2010	limited series	
Steve Rogers: Super-Soldier		Annual #1	Jun 2011		
Stoker's Dracula		#1–4	Oct 2004 – May 2005	limited series	
Storm	vol. 1	#1–4	Feb 1996 – May 1996	limited series	
Storm	vol. 2	#1–6	Apr 2006 – Sep 2006	limited series	
Storm	vol. 3	#1–11	Sep 2014 – Jul 2015		
Storm	vol. 4	#1–5	Jul 2023 – Nov 2023	limited series	
Storm	vol. 5	#1–12	Dec 2024 – Nov 2025		
Storm	Battlebook: Streets of Fire		Dec 1998	one-shot	
Storm	Earth's Mightiest Mutant	#1–5	Apr 2026 – Aug 2026	limited series	
Storm	Lifedream	#1	Mar 2025	one-shot	
Storm & The Brotherhood of Mutants		#1–3	Apr 2023 – Jun 2023	limited series; Sins of Sinister tie-in	
Stormbreaker: The Saga of Beta Ray Bill		#1–6	Mar 2005 – Aug 2005	limited series	
Strange	vol. 1	#1–6	Nov 2004 – Jul 2005	limited series	
Strange	vol. 2	#1–4	Jan 2010 – Apr 2010	limited series	
Strange	vol. 3	#1–10	May 2022 – Mar 2023		
Strange Academy		#1–18	May 2020 – Sep 2022		
Strange Academy	Amazing Spider-Man	#1	Dec 2023	one-shot; Strange Academy: The Deadly Field Trip part 3 of 3	
Strange Academy	Blood Hunt	#1–3	Jul 2024 – Sep 2024	limited series	
Strange Academy	Finals	#1–6	Dec 2022 – Jun 2023	limited series	
Strange Academy	Miles Morales	#1	Oct 2023	one-shot; Strange Academy: The Deadly Field Trip part 1 of 3	
Strange Academy	Moon Knight	#1	Nov 2023	one-shot; Strange Academy: The Deadly Field Trip part 2 of 3	
Strange Academy Presents: The Death of Doctor Strange		#1	Jan 2022	one-shot	
Strange Days		#1	Dec 1995	one-shot; movie adaptation	
Strange Tales	vol. 1	#86–168	Jul 1961 – May 1968	previous issues published by Atlas Comics; continued as Doctor Strange vol. 1	
Strange Tales	vol. 1	#169–188	Sep 1973 – Nov 1976		
Strange Tales	vol. 1	Annual #1–2	1962 – 1963		
Strange Tales	vol. 2	#1–19	Apr 1987 – Oct 1988		
Strange Tales	vol. 3	#1	Nov 1994	one-shot	
Strange Tales	vol. 4	#1–2	Sep 1998 – Oct 1998	limited series	
Strange Tales	vol. 5	#1–3	Nov 2009 – Jan 2010	limited series	
Strange Tales	vol. 6	#1–4	Dec 2025 – Mar 2026	limited series	
Strange Tales	Dark Corners	#1	May 1998	one-shot	
Strange Tales	II	#1–3	Dec 2010 – Feb 2011	limited series	
Street Poet Ray		#1–4	1990	limited series	
Strikeforce		#1–9	Nov 2019 – Oct 2020		
Strikeforce: Morituri		#1–31	Dec 1986 – Jul 1989		
Strikeforce: Morituri	Electric Undertow	#1–5	Dec 1989 – Mar 1990	limited series	
Strong Guy Reborn		#1	Sep 1997	one-shot	
Stryfe's Strike File		#1	Jan 1993	one-shot	
Sub-Mariner	vol. 2	#1–72	May 1968 – Sep 1974	vol. 1 was published by Atlas Comics	
Sub-Mariner	vol. 2	Special #1–2	Jan 1971 – Jan 1972		
Sub-Mariner	vol. 3	#1–6	Aug 2007 – Jan 2008	limited series; The Initiative tie-in	
Sub-Mariner	The Depths	#1–5	Nov 2008 – May 2009	limited series	
Sub-Mariner Comics 70th Anniversary Special		#1	Jun 2009	one-shot	
Suburban Jersey Ninja She-Devils		#1	Jan 1992	one-shot	
Sunfire & Big Hero Six		#1–3	Sep 1998 – Nov 1998	limited series	
Superior Avengers		#1–6	Jun 2025 – Nov 2025	limited series; One World Under Doom tie-in	
Superior Carnage		#1–5	Sep 2013 – Jan 2014	limited series	
Superior Carnage		Annual #1	Apr 2014		
The Superior Foes of Spider-Man		#1–17	Sep 2013 – Jan 2015		
Superior Iron Man		#1–9	Jan 2015 – Aug 2015		
Superior Octopus		#1	Dec 2018	one-shot; Spider-Geddon tie-in	
Superior Spider-Man	vol. 1	#1–33 #6AU	Mar 2013 – Nov 2014		
Superior Spider-Man	vol. 1	Annual #1–2	Jan 2014 – May 2014		
Superior Spider-Man	vol. 2	#1–12	Feb 2019 – Dec 2019		
Superior Spider-Man	vol. 3	#1–8	Jan 2024 – Aug 2024	limited series	
Superior Spider-Man	Returns	#1	Dec 2023	one-shot	
Superior Spider-Man Team-Up		#1–12	Sep 2013 – Jun 2014		
Superior Spider-Man Team-Up		Special #1	Dec 2013		
Superman/Fantastic Four			Apr 1999	one-shot; co-published with DC	
Superman vs. The Amazing Spider-Man			1976	one-shot; co-published with DC	
The Supernaturals		#1–4	Dec 1998	limited series	
Supernatural Thrillers		#1–15	Dec 1972 – Oct 1975		
Super Soldiers		#1–8	Apr 1993 – Nov 1993		
Super-Villain Classics		#1	May 1983	one-shot	
Super-Villain Team-Up	vol. 1	#1–17	Aug 1975 – Jun 1980		
Super-Villain Team-Up	vol. 1	Giant-Size #1–2	Mar 1975 – Jun 1975		
Super-Villain Team-Up	vol. 2	#1–5	Sep 2007 – Jan 2008	limited series; also known as Modok's 11	
Supreme Power	vol. 1	#1–18	Oct 2003 – Oct 2005		
Supreme Power	vol. 2	#1–4	Aug 2011 – Nov 2011	limited series	
Supreme Power	Hyperion	#1–5	Nov 2005 – Mar 2006	limited series	
Supreme Power	Nighthawk	#1–6	Nov 2005 – Apr 2006	limited series	
Survive!		#1	May 2014	one-shot	
Sweet XVI		#1–6	May 1991 – Oct 1991		
Sweet XVI	Back to School Special	#1	Nov 1992	one-shot	
S.W.O.R.D.	vol. 1	#1–5	Jan 2010 – May 2010		
S.W.O.R.D.	vol. 2	#1–11	Feb 2021 – Feb 2022		
Sword Master		#1–12	Sep 2019 – Jan 2021		
Symbiote Spider-Man		#1–5	Jun 2019 – Oct 2019	limited series	
Symbiote Spider-Man	2099	#1–5	May 2024 – Sep 2024	limited series	
Symbiote Spider-Man	Alien Reality	#1–5	Feb 2020 – Sep 2020	limited series	
Symbiote Spider-Man	Crossroads	#1–5	Sep 2021 – Jan 2022	limited series	
Symbiote Spider-Man	King In Black	#1–5	Jan 2021 – May 2021	limited series	
