= Captain Trips =

Captain Trips may refer to:

- The first part of Stephen King's novel The Stand, named for the fictional disease outbreak described therein
  - The Stand: Captain Trips, the first volume of The Stand comic adaptation
- A virus appearing in Stephen King's 1969 short story "Night Surf".
- A nickname of American musician Jerry Garcia (1942–1995)
- The nickname of a hippie character in Stephen King's miniseries Golden Years
- Alfred Matthew Hubbard (1901–1982), proponent for the drug LSD
- "Captain Trips", a 2014 episode of the TV series Revolution
