= Spellbinder (comics) =

Spellbinder, in comics, may refer to:

- Spellbinder (DC Comics), two characters, both of which are foes of Batman
- Spellbinders, a Marvel Comics limited series, published in 2005

== See also ==
- Spellbinder (disambiguation)
