= The Stand: American Nightmares =

American comic book series

- Cover of the first issue

Publication information
- Publisher: Marvel Comics
- Publication date: March 11, 2009 - August 19, 2009
- No. of issues: 5
- Main character(s): Randall Flagg, Stu Redman, Fran Goldsmith, Larry Underwood

Creative team
- Created by: Stephen King
- Written by: Roberto Aguirre-Sacasa
- Artist: Mike Perkins

The Stand: American Nightmares is a five-issue comic book miniseries, the second of five The Stand series by Marvel Comics, adapting Stephen King's 1978 novel of the same name. It was overseen by King, written by Roberto Aguirre-Sacasa, illustrated by Mike Perkins, and colored by Laura Martin.

== Publisher's summary ==
The deadly super flu Captain Trips has devastated the country and now the few survivors must pick up the pieces and go on. Larry Underwood seeks escape from New York City. Lloyd contemplates an extremely unsavory dinner option in jail, and Stu Redman makes a desperate bid for freedom from his interrogators. Most ominous of all, the strange being called Randall Flagg continues his dreadful journey across the devastated landscape of America.

== Issues ==
#	Release dates	Description
1	Mar 11, 2009	The deadly super flu Captain Trips has devastated the country and now the few survivors must pick up the pieces and go on. Larry Underwood seeks escape from New York City. Lloyd contemplates an extremely unsavory dinner option in jail, and Stu Redman makes a desperate bid for freedom from his interrogators. Most ominous of all, the stranger being called Randall Flagg continues his dread journey across the devastated landscape of America.
2	Apr 15, 2009	The dead are still dead and the living are still finding their way through this horribly altered landscape of America. Randall Flagg performs his first act of magic and begins his cross country journey in a souped-up Buick. And then, there's the strangest addition to the cast yet... Donald Merwin Elbert, the Trashcan Man, a pyromaniac who suddenly has no one to curb his unhealthy obsession with blowing things up. All this plus Rita suggests to Larry Underwood that they should start making their way out of New York, perhaps via the Lincoln Tunnel...
3	May 28, 2009	When Larry Underwood and his new companion Rita Blakemoor decide to escape from New York, they head for the Lincoln Tunnel, little knowing that they are embarking on a nightmare journey that will unleash their deepest, darkest fears and demons, both real and imagined. Meanwhile, Harold and Frannie set off on their own great adventure (on mopeds!), and Stu Redman meets another survivor.
4	Jul 8, 2009	The penultimate chapter of the second volume based on Stephen King's horror epic! The survivors of the Captain Trips plague have started to team-up. Stu Redman and Glen Bateman trade origin stories—and horror stories about their mutual nightmares—while Randall Flagg sets out to recruit his first soldier in the ultimate battle between Good and Evil: Lloyd Henreid. But will the starving madman accept the dark man's offer? And either way, will he or his soul survive?
5	Aug 19, 2009	It's the Fourth of July, the first holiday post-plague, but none of the survivors are celebrating. While Nick Andros hovers between life and death—and between the influence of Randall Flagg and Mother Abigail—Larry Underwood makes a shocking discovery in his tent... And Stu Redman's path intersects with Harold and Frannie's, but immediately a conflict (that will have enormous ramifications for all our players) erupts among the three.
