= Bowkett =

Bowkett is a surname. Notable people with this surname include:

- Alan Bowkett (born 1951), British businessman
- Jane Maria Bowkett (1837–1891), British painter
- Len Bowkett (1906–1976), English rugby footballer
- Steve Bowkett, British writer and hypnotherapist

== Other uses ==
- Bowkett v Action Finance Ltd
- Starr-Bowkett Society, a financial institution
- Spellbinder (Bowkett novel)
