= Spellbinder =

Spellbinder may refer to:

== Film and television ==
- The Spellbinder, a 1939 American drama film
- Spellbinder (film), a 1988 American supernatural thriller film
- Spellbinder (TV series), a 1995 Australian-Polish science fiction series
- Spellbinder, a sorcerer or sorceress in the animated series Tara Duncan
- Spellbinder, a character in The Adventures of Letterman, a segment from the television series The Electric Company
- Spellbinder, a character in the animated series Batman Beyond

== Games ==
- Spellbinder (board game), a 1980 game published by Task Force Games
- Spellbinder (paper-and-pencil game), a 1977 simultaneous game by Richard Bartle
- Spellbinder (video game), a 1987 computer game for the BBC Micro and Acorn Electron
- Spellbinder: The Nexus Conflict, a 1999 video game by Mythic Entertainment

== Literature ==
- Spellbinder (Bowkett novel), a 1985 novel by Stephen Bowkett
- Spellbinder, a 2006 novel by Melanie Rawn
- Spellbinder (DC Comics), four supervillains
- Spellbinders, a Marvel Comics limited series

== Music ==
- The Spellbinders, a 1960s American soul group
- Spellbinder (album) or the title song, by Gábor Szabó, 1966
- "Spellbinder", a song by Foreigner from Double Vision, 1978

== Other uses ==
- Spellbinder, a 1978 word processing program for the CP/M and CP/M-86 operating system; see Eagle Computer § Spellbinder word processor
- Spellbinder (wrestler), Harry Del Rios (born 1972), American professional wrestler
