= Rowans Ruin =

American comic book

- Issue one cover

Publication information
- Publisher: Boom! Studios
- Genre: Horror
- Publication date: October 2015 - January 2016
- No. of issues: 4

Creative team
- Written by: Mike Carey
- Artist: Mike Perkins
- Colorist: Andy Troy

Rowans Ruin is a 2015 American comic book four issue miniseries was written by Mike Carey and drawn by Mike Perkins. The two developed the idea after Perkins expressed interest in telling "a creepy supernatural story with a lot of twists and fake-outs" and came up with the idea of a story about "two young women doing a house-swap – only to find that one of the houses has some unsettling history to it."

== Synopsis ==
The comic opens with Katie making an emergency phone call as she tries to escape Rowans Rise. While fleeing she makes mention of several murders that took place during the course of the house's history and refers to an unnamed evil that was born at the house. She emphasizes that if she dies before the police arrive, that it shouldn't be considered anything other a murder. Just as she's getting ready to tell the dispatcher about what or who is committing the murders, Katie is attacked by a male figure with glowing red eyes.

The comic then flashes back to six months prior, showing Katie talking with her parents about advertising her apartment on a house swap website. Despite her parents' misgivings, she agrees to swap houses with Emily, a young woman living in England. Upon arrival Katie is extremely taken with both England and Emily's home, Rowans Rise, and features it heavily in her blog "New Adventures of Katie". During a video she makes mention of a nearby dule tree where they hung purported witches and odd things she noticed about the house, such as bird bones set in the mortar of some of the doors. She also comments on an animal trap she found in the house and repeated blackouts. Some time after she settles into the house Katie enters Emily's room (despite requests that she not enter), where she discovers that Emily's bed is surrounded by a ring of salt and other supernatural paraphernalia. She shrugs this off, however, and decides to continue her stay at Rowans Rise.

Katie later meets PC Hallam at a bar and the two strike up a romance. Through Hallam she discovers that the house is rumored to be haunted, especially as multiple animals have been killed on the property. Katie confesses to him that when she was younger she would receive strong feelings about places, and that while this was thought to have been a kind of mental illness that went away on its own, she has started to have bad experiences and feelings upon waking. The first issue ends with Katie briefly seeing an image of a strange man in her bathroom mirror, but dismissing it as a figment of her imagination.

== Reception ==
Critical reception for the series has been positive and the first issue has a rating of 7.7 on Comic Book Roundup, based on 7 reviews. Shock Till You Drop wrote a favorable review for Rowans Ruin, stating "Mixing classic horror with modern technologies, the work offers up a story of isolation that preys on the creeping fear that we are never really alone and, with a mini-series format, promises a limited work that won’t over stay its welcome." Comic Book Resources gave the first issue four stars, as they felt that it was "a rare combination of great characterization and heart-stopping horror that doesn't resort to clichés, instead focusing on the characters and their 21st century influences."
