= Kiss Kiss Bang Bang (comics) =

American comic book series

Publication information
- Publisher: CrossGen Entertainment; Marvel Comics
- Schedule: Monthly
- Format: Ongoing series
- Genre: Spy
- Publication date: February – June 2004
- No. of issues: 5
- Main character(s): Charles Basildon; Stephanie Shelly; Lazarus Bale; Pippa Westlake

Creative team
- Created by: Mark Alessi; Gina M. Villa; Mike Perkins
- Written by: Tony Bedard
- Penciller: Mike Perkins
- Inker: Andrew Hennessy
- Letterer: David Lanphear
- Colorist: Laura Vilari

Kiss Kiss Bang Bang is an American comic book series originally published by CrossGen Entertainment from February to June 2004. It ran five issues before ceasing publication due to the bankruptcy of CrossGen.

== Publication history ==
Kiss Kiss Bang Bang was the brainchild of penciller Mike Perkins who was also influenced by the 1960s show The Avengers, with Tony Bedard fleshing out other aspects of the series.

The series ended prematurely when CrossGen went bankrupt, but the company was bought by Marvel Comics. Marvel then announced in August 2011 that Kiss Kiss Bang Bang was one of several CrossGen titles returning as a five-issue limited series, with Peter Milligan writing the story and Ramon Rosanas as the artist.

As of 2026, the miniseries has yet to be published.

== Plot synopsis ==
Charles Basildon is the name given to the best spy working for MI6. His name has garnered a reputation over the years for invoking fear in those who hear it, with the current incarnation adding to the mythos in his own way. The title "Sir" is added to the name.

With little regard for his partner's well-being, the current Charles Basildon, described as an amoral snake "among other things, has gone through six partners, each of who ended up dead". The Prime minister, concerned with his fitness for duty, requests that Basildon be assessed. In response to this, the director of MI6, Sir Richard Pilchard, aware of Basildon's attitudes, assigns him a new apprentice, Stephanie Shelly, hoping she might curb Basildon's flagrant disregard for danger and the safety of civilians. Also, Shelly was to eventually become the next Sir Charles Basildon.

The two are partnered up and are sent on their first mission to Siberia. On the search for a prisoner, the couple are attempting to verify a connection the prisoner may have to a Lazarus Bale, deemed "Alpha" level threat by MI6. As the pair arrive, they find that the prisoner's hands have been cut off, his tongue has been removed, and that there is a bomb strapped to his chest. Shelly suggests she can cease the bomb from going off, but Basildon is only worried about for himself. Annoyed by this remark, Shelly hits Basildon in the nose with the back of her head. They both fall backwards through a grate and into the prison's fuel tunnels. With no time left, the pair makes a run for it as the bomb explodes. Later, what seems like Adolf Hitler, Stalin, and an albino character later identified as Lazarus Bale, are leaving the prison as the bomb explodes. Bale is confident that the agents have been handled.
