= The Stand =

1978 novel by Stephen King

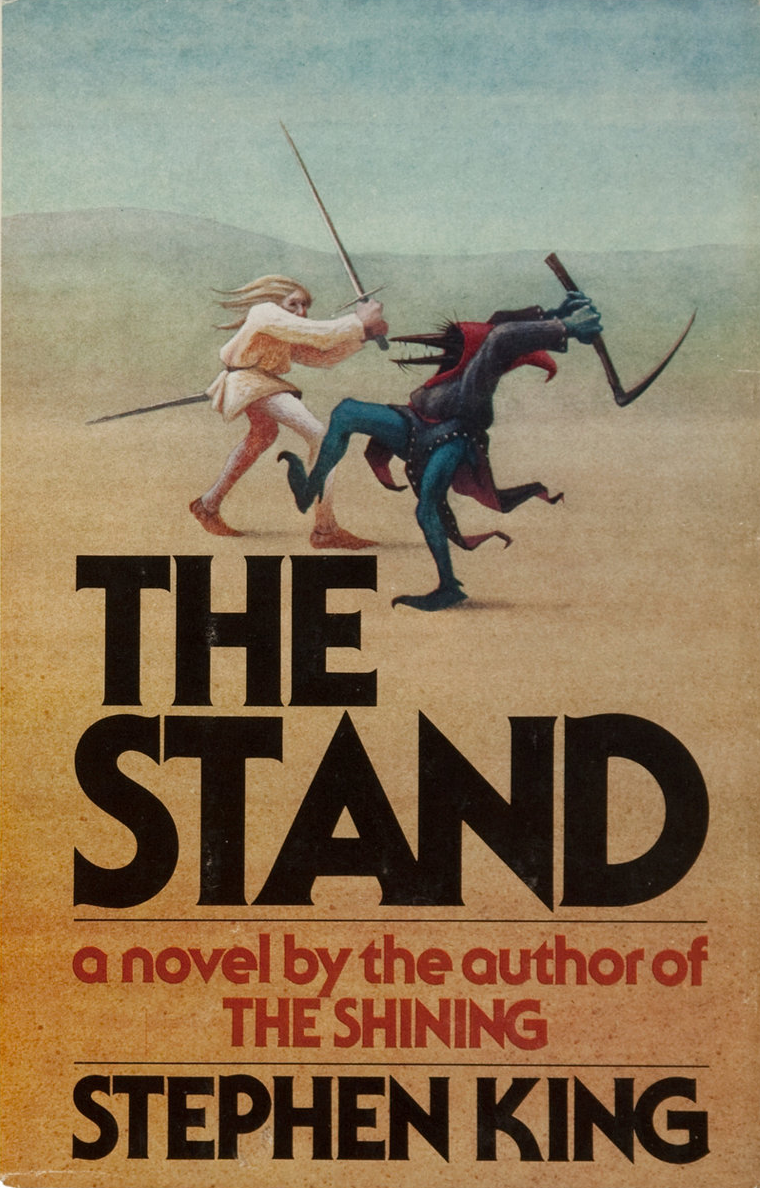
- First edition cover
- Author: Stephen King
- Cover artist: John Cayea
- Language: English
- Genre: Post-apocalyptic, Dark fantasy
- Publisher: Doubleday
- Publication date: October 3, 1978
- Publication place: United States
- Media type: Print (hardcover and paperback)
- Pages: 823 (1,152 in the uncut version)
- ISBN: 978-0-385-12168-2

The Stand is an epic post-apocalyptic dark fantasy novel written by American author Stephen King and first published in 1978 by Doubleday. The plot centers on a deadly pandemic of weaponized influenza and its aftermath, in which some of the few surviving humans gather into factions that are each led by a personification of either good or evil and seem fated to clash with each other. King started writing the story in February 1975, seeking to create an epic in the spirit of The Lord of the Rings. The book was difficult for him to write because of the large number of characters and storylines. The novel marks the first appearance of Randall Flagg, King's recurring antagonist, whom King would reintroduce several times in his later writings.

In 1990, The Stand was reprinted as The Complete & Uncut Edition. King restored over 300 pages of text that had been removed from his original manuscript, revised the order of the chapters, shifted the novel's setting ten years forward from 1980 to 1990, and accordingly corrected a number of cultural references. The Complete and Uncut Edition of The Stand is Stephen King's longest stand-alone work at 1,152 pages, surpassing It, a novel of 1,138 pages. The book became a #1 bestseller and sold 4.5 million copies.

The Stand was highly acclaimed by critics and is considered one of King's best novels. It has been included in lists of the best books of all time by Rolling Stone, Time, the Modern Library, Amazon and the BBC. A television miniseries of the same name based on the novel was broadcast on ABC in 1994. From 2008 to 2012, Marvel Comics published a series of comics written by Roberto Aguirre-Sacasa and illustrated by Mike Perkins. Another miniseries debuted on CBS All Access in December 2020, and finished airing in February 2021.

== Plot ==
An extremely contagious and lethal strain of influenza, resistant to antibodies and vaccines, is developed as a biological weapon within a secret DoD installation in the Mojave Desert, and is accidentally released. The laboratory staff dies, but security guard Charles Campion manages to escape and takes his family out of state. After a couple of days, his car crashes at a gas station in Arnette, Texas. All of those involved at the scene – the gas station owner and his visitors, plus the ambulance attendants – are exposed to the virus. The gas station owner infects his cousin, a traffic cop, and the virus rapidly spreads from there.

The US Army attempts to isolate Arnette, going as far as to execute unarmed civilians. Still, the efforts are in vain – the virus, christened by journalists as the "superflu", "tubeneck", or, most commonly, "Captain Trips", spreads across the country and travels beyond its borders, triggering a global pandemic of apocalyptic proportions. Approximately 99.4% of the world's population is infected and killed within a month. A prism of several personal tragedies describes the collapse of society, explosions of violence, the inability of the government and martial law to stop the pandemic, and the near-extinction of humanity. Many survivors of the virus also die, unable to accept the loss of their loved ones or survive in a world where they must fend for themselves.

Stuart Redman, one of the people present at the gas station when Campion crashes his car, proves immune to the virus. He is forcibly held in specialized centers at Atlanta, Georgia, then Stovington, Vermont, in the hope that a treatment can be made. Redman escapes after the virus disables the Stovington center's staff, and he is forced to kill one of the members in self-defense. He meets with sociology professor Glen Bateman and his Irish Setter Kojak, pregnant college student Frannie Goldsmith, and teenage outcast Harold Lauder. Larry Underwood, a disillusioned pop singer, joins the group in the wake of his mother's death, along with Nadine Cross, a teacher from New Hampshire, and a young boy she found alone, whom she calls "Joe" due to his refusal to speak. Stuart and Frannie are drawn to each other and become lovers, to Harold's disappointment and resentment.

The group shares a common dream of a 108-year-old woman living in Hemingford Home, Nebraska. The woman, Abagail Freemantle – better known as "Mother Abagail" – becomes the group's spiritual leader. Upon arriving in Nebraska and meeting Abagail, "Joe" introduces himself as Leo Rockway, which upsets Nadine, whom Mother Abagail deems to have a dark presence within her. Mother Abagail guides the group to Boulder, Colorado, where other survivors are drawn by her telepathic appeals. New additions to the group include Nick Andros, a deaf-mute deputy from Shoyo, Arkansas; Tom Cullen, a kind-hearted, intellectually disabled man from May, Oklahoma; and Ralph Brentner, a good-natured farmer from Oklahoma. The group attempts to build a new society. They call their land the "Free Zone", organize funeral brigades, and restore electricity.

Meanwhile, in Las Vegas, Randall Flagg, the "dark man", who possesses supernatural abilities, creates his own society from people called by his visions. The people worship Flagg as a messiah and joyfully submit to his fascist dictatorship, in which undesirables are crucified. Flagg rescues spree killer Lloyd Henreid from prison and makes him his lieutenant. A pyromaniac nicknamed "The Trashcan Man", after destroying oil tanks in Gary, Indiana and meeting a power-hungry madman named "The Kid", joins Flagg's group and becomes a weapons specialist. Flagg prepares for war with Boulder.

Mother Abagail, believing she has been too prideful in watching the Zone grow, goes into self-imposed exile. During her absence, the Free Zone's leadership committee secretly sends three people to Flagg's territory to act as spies: Dayna Jurgens, a woman rescued from a group of armed men kidnapping and raping women; Judge Farris, a retired judge from Illinois; and Tom. Harold and Nadine, who have both been tempted by Flagg through their dreams, stage an attack on the committee with a bomb. The explosion kills several people, including Nick, but most of the committee members avoid the explosion thanks to Mother Abagail's return. Before dying of exhaustion, Mother Abagail reports God's will: Stuart, Glen, Larry, and Ralph must go to Las Vegas and destroy Flagg.

As Harold and Nadine flee, Flagg causes Harold's motorcycle to crash, and he falls over the edge of a cliff, severely breaking his leg. As his leg turns gangrenous, he realizes the harm he has done, writes a note of apology, and commits suicide. Nadine leaves Harold for dead and meets Flagg in the desert, where he rapes and impregnates her while revealing his true demonic form, an experience that leaves her semi-catatonic. The Trashcan Man has a psychotic episode and destroys Flagg's air force before Flagg can destroy Boulder. He then leaves Las Vegas to atone by finding a more powerful weapon for Flagg. When Tom's fleeting presence in Las Vegas as the sole surviving spy belatedly comes to light, Nadine takes advantage of Flagg's unsettled state to goad him into killing her and her unborn child.

Stuart breaks his leg en route and persuades the others to go on without him, telling them that God will provide for him if that is what is meant to happen. Leaving Kojak with Stu, the remaining three are soon taken prisoner by Flagg's army. Lloyd kills Glen for refusing to grovel before Flagg, who gathers his entire collective to witness the execution of Ralph and Larry. Moments before they are to be killed, the Trashcan Man arrives with a nuclear warhead. Flagg conjures a magical ball of energy to silence a dissenter. Still, it is transformed into a giant glowing hand – "the Hand of God" – which detonates the bomb, destroying Las Vegas and killing all of Flagg's followers, along with Larry and Ralph.

Tom finds Stu near death, but hears Nick's voice directing him to a supply of antibiotics, and saves his life. After nursing Stu back to health and helping his leg heal, the two travel back to Boulder, where Frannie has given birth to her son after a caesarean section. The baby, named Peter after Frannie's late father, manages to fight off the superflu. Four months later, Stuart and Frannie decide to leave Boulder and move to Ogunquit as society slowly reestablishes itself.

The extended edition includes an epilogue in which Flagg wakes up somewhere in the Southern Hemisphere. Regaining his former strength and calling himself Russell Faraday, he begins recruiting adherents among a preliterate, dark-skinned people.

== Background ==
In Danse Macabre, King writes about the origins of The Stand at some length. One source was Patty Hearst's case. The original idea was to create a novel about the episode because "it seemed that only a novel might really succeed in explaining all the contradictions". The author also mentions George R. Stewart's novel Earth Abides, which describes the odyssey of one of the last human survivors after the population is nearly annihilated by a plague, as one of the main inspirations:

With my Patty Hearst book, I never found the right way in... and during that entire six-week period, something else was nagging very quietly at the back of my mind. It was a news story I had read about an accidental CBW spill in Utah. (...) This article called up memories of a novel called Earth Abides, by George R. Stewart.

(...) and one day while sitting at my typewriter, (...) I wrote—just to write something: The world comes to an end but everybody in the SLA is somehow immune. Snake bit them. I looked at that for a while and then typed: No more gas shortages. That was sort of cheerful, in a horrible sort of way.

The Stand was also planned by King as an epic story akin to The Lord of the Rings in a contemporary American setting:

For a long time—ten years, at least—I had wanted to write a fantasy epic like The Lord of the Rings, only with an American setting. I just couldn't figure out how to do it. Then . . . after my wife and kids and I moved to Boulder, Colorado, I saw a 60 Minutes segment on CBW (chemical-biological warfare). I never forgot the gruesome footage of the test mice shuddering, convulsing, and dying, all in twenty seconds or less. That got me remembering a chemical spill in Utah, that killed a bunch of sheep (these were canisters on their way to some burial ground; they fell off the truck and ruptured). I remembered a news reporter saying, 'If the winds had been blowing the other way, there was Salt Lake City.' This incident later served as the basis of a movie called Rage, starring George C. Scott, but before it was released, I was deep into The Stand, finally writing my American fantasy epic, set in a plague-decimated USA. Only instead of a hobbit, my hero was a Texan named Stu Redman, and instead of a Dark Lord, my villain was a ruthless drifter and supernatural madman named Randall Flagg. The land of Mordor ('where the shadows lie,' according to Tolkien) was played by Las Vegas.

While writing The Stand, King nearly stopped because of writer's block. Eventually, he reached the conclusion that the heroes were becoming too complacent, and were beginning to repeat all the same mistakes of their old society. In an attempt to resolve this, he added the part of the storyline where Harold and Nadine construct a bomb, which explodes in a Free Zone committee meeting, killing Nick Andros, Chad Norris, and Susan Stern. Later, Mother Abagail explains on her deathbed that God permitted the bombing out of dissatisfaction with the heroes' focus on petty politics, and not on the ultimate quest of destroying Flagg. King sardonically observed that the bomb saved the book, and that he only had to kill half of the core cast to do this. According to King, Blue Öyster Cult's 1976 song "(Don't Fear) The Reaper" also served as a source of inspiration for the novel.

== Publication history ==
The novel was originally published in 1978 in hardcover, with a setting date of 1980, in abridged form. The first paperback release in 1980 changed the setting date to 1985.

The Stand: The Complete and Uncut Edition
- Author: Stephen King
- Cover artist: John Cayea
- Language: English
- Genre: Postapocalyptic
- Publisher: Doubleday
- Publication date: May 1990
- Publication place: US
- Media type: Print
- Pages: 1,152
- ISBN: 978-0-385-19957-5

In 1990, an unabridged edition of The Stand was published, billed as The Complete and Uncut Edition. Published in hardcover by Doubleday in May 1990, this became the longest book published by King at 1,152 pages. When the novel was originally published in 1978, Doubleday warned King that the book's size would make it too expensive for the market to bear.

As a result, he cut about 400 pages (around 150,000 words) from the original manuscript. This edition reinstates most of the deletions (as selected by King) and updates the setting from the 1980s to the 1990s. This new edition features a new preface by King and illustrations by Bernie Wrightson, which were later released as a portfolio. Doubleday published a deluxe edition of The Stand: The Complete and Uncut Edition, limited to 1,250 numbered copies and 52 lettered copies. This edition, known as the "Coffin Box" edition due to the book being housed in a wooden case, was signed by King and Wrightson.

== Reception ==
The Stand received critical acclaim and was nominated for the World Fantasy Award for Best Novel in 1979. In 2003, the novel was listed at number 53 on the BBC's The Big Read poll.

== The End of the World as We Know It ==
The End of the World as We Know It is a collection of 34 short stories authorized by King for publication, with contributions by numerous authors and editors, inspired by the events of The Stand; more specifically, the 1990 rerelease The Complete & Uncut Edition. Taking place either during or after the events of the novel, it makes frequent references to the happenings of the original. Authors were asked to not write from the point of view of any of the established major characters, but were able to write about their actions and dialogue; additionally, they had "no restrictions on geography", with some stories taking place outside of the United States, where the original novel had taken place.

It was published in August 2025 by Gallery Books and edited by Christopher Golden and Brian Keene. Keene announced the development of the anthology in October 2023.

The novel includes a foreword by Golden and an afterword by Keene, as well as an introduction by King himself. The audiobook was released the same day as the hardcover and paperback, narrated by Sean Patrick Hopkins and Adenrele Ojo.

The 800-page book is split into four parts:

1. Down with the Sickness: (stories 01–17) taking place during the initial spread of the Superflu.
2. The Long Walk: (stories 18–26) taking place between the time that survivors were migrating to Boulder, Colorado and Las Vegas, Nevada, and the detonation of the Nuclear bomb at the climax of The Stand.
3. Life Was Such a Wheel: (stories 27–32) taking place immediately after the events of the novel, and the decades that follow.
4. Other Worlds than These: (stories 33–34) undisclosed by the authors.

| # | Title | Author |
|---|---|---|
| 01 | "Room 24" | Caroline Kepnes |
| 02 | "The Tripps" | Wrath James White |
| 03 | "Bright Light City" | Meg Gardiner |
| 04 | "Every Dog Has Its Day" | Bryan Smith |
| 05 | "Lockdown" | Bev Vincent |
| 06 | "In a Pig's Eye" | Joe R. Lansdale |
| 07 | "Lenora" | Jonathan Janz |
| 08 | "The Hope Boat" | Gabino Iglesias |
| 09 | "Wrong Fucking Place, Wrong Fucking Time" | C. Robert Cargill |
| 10 | "Prey Instinct" | Hailey Piper |
| 11 | "Grace" | Tim Lebbon |
| 12 | "Moving Day" | Richard Chizmar |
| 13 | "La Mala Hora" | Alex Segura |
| 14 | "The African Painted Dog" | Catriona Ward |
| 15 | "Till Human Voices Wake Us, and We Drown" | Poppy Z. Brite |
| 16 | "Kovach's Last Case" | Michael Koryta |
| 17 | "Make Your Own Way" | Alma Katsu |
| 18 | "I Love the Dead" | Josh Malerman |
| 19 | "Milagros" | Cynthia Pelayo |
| 20 | "The Legion of Swine" | S. A. Cosby |
| 21 | "Keep the Devil Down" | Rio Youers |
| 22 | "Across the Pond" | V Castro |
| 23 | "The Boat Man" | Tananarive Due and Steven Barnes |
| 24 | "The Story I Tell Is the Story of Some of Us" | Paul Tremblay |
| 25 | "The Mosque at the End of the World" | Usman T. Malik |
| 26 | "Abagail's Gethsemane" | Wayne Brady and Maurice Broaddus |
| 27 | "He's a Righteous Man" | Ronald Malfi |
| 28 | "Awaiting Orders in Flaggston" | Somer Canon |
| 29 | "Grand Junction" | Chuck Wendig |
| 30 | "Hunted to Extinction" | Premee Mohamed |
| 31 | "Come the Last Night of Sadness" | Catherynne M. Valente |
| 32 | "The Devil's Children" | Sarah Langan |
| 33 | "The Unfortunate Convalescence of the SuperLawyer" | Nat Cassidy |
| 34 | "Walk on Gilded Splinters" | David J. Schow |

== Adaptations ==
=== Television ===
A film adaptation of The Stand was in development hell for over 10 years. During the 1980s, Stephen King had planned a theatrical film, with George A. Romero directing and himself writing, not trusting anybody else with the project. In the 1990 Complete and Uncut edition of the book, King admitted he had in mind a few fan castings for his characters, those being Robert Duvall as Randall Flagg and Marshall Crenshaw as Larry Underwood. Writing a workable screenplay proved difficult, due to the novel's length. King talked about adapting it for television, but was informed that the television networks did not "want to see the end of the world, particularly in prime time." Eventually King allowed screenwriter Rospo Pallenberg, who was a fan of The Stand, to write his own adaptation of the novel. Pallenberg's script was for an approximately three hour film which King felt was true to the novel. After the script was written, Warner Bros. backed out of the project. ABC eventually offered Stephen King the chance to make The Stand into an eight-hour miniseries. King wrote a new screenplay, omitting some parts for television broadcast. The miniseries, directed by Mick Garris, was broadcast in 1994.

Between 2011 and 2016, Warner Bros. Pictures and CBS Films were developing a feature-length film adaptation of The Stand. In August 2011, director David Yates and screenwriter Steve Kloves, known for their collaboration on the Harry Potter films, were hired to write and direct a multi-movie version of The Stand, but left the project in October 2011, as Yates felt it would work better as a miniseries. Both Ben Affleck and Scott Cooper dropped out over creative differences with the studio. On February 25, 2014, Josh Boone was hired to write and direct the adaptation. He later revealed that he wanted Christian Bale to play Randall Flagg and Matthew McConaughey for the role of Stu Redman.

By September 10, 2014, the script had been completed and pre-production was underway. In November, Boone planned to split his adaptation into four full-length feature films in an effort to remain true to the breadth of King's sprawling novel. In June 2015, Warner Bros. proposed an eight-part Showtime miniseries to set up the story, which would culminate in Josh Boone's film. In February 2016, The Stand project was put on hold and the rights reverted to CBS Films.

In September 2017, King talked of doing an extended TV series on Showtime or CBS All Access. In January 2019, a 10-hour limited series was ordered by CBS Television Studios to be broadcast on CBS All Access. Alexander Skarsgard, James Marsden, Amber Heard, Whoopi Goldberg, Greg Kinnear, Odessa Young, and Henry Zaga were all in consideration for the roles of Randall Flagg, Stu Redman, Nadine Cross, Mother Abagail, Glen Bateman, Frannie Goldsmith, and Nick Andros, respectively. The production was filmed in and near Vancouver, British Columbia, Canada, from September 2019 to March 2020; filming was completed a few days before it would have been shut down due to the COVID-19 pandemic. The production features Stephen King's son Owen King as a producer and writer, and a new ending written by Stephen King. The miniseries was first broadcast in December 2020, to mixed reviews.

=== Comics ===
Marvel Comics adapted The Stand into a series of six five-issue comic book miniseries. The series was written by Roberto Aguirre-Sacasa and illustrated by Mike Perkins. Colorist Laura Martin, letterer Chris Eliopoulos, and cover artist Lee Bermejo were also on the staff. The first issue of The Stand: Captain Trips was released on September 10, 2008.

=== Music ===
The novel is cited as an inspiration for Abba's song "The Piper" on their 1980 album Super Trouper.

Metallica derived the title for their second album, Ride the Lightning, from a quote in The Stand in which a character uses the phrase to refer to execution by electric chair.

The Alarm had a song on the 1984 album Declaration entitled "The Stand (Prophecy)" as an homage to the book. The song contained lyrics directly related to the book, such as "I met the walking dude, religious, with his worn out cowboy boots", and "Hey Trashcan, where you going boy?" The main chorus of the song was "Come on down and meet your maker, come on down and make the stand."

In 1987, Anthrax released their third studio album, Among the Living, which is based on the novel. Lyrics which include "I'm the walking dude", are reference to novel antagonist Randall Flagg.

=== Film ===
In 2025, a new film adaptation was reported to be in development with Doug Liman to direct.

== See also ==
- "Night Surf"
