= The Stand (comics) =

Comic book series by Marvel Comics

- Cover of Captain Trips #1
- Created by: Stephen King

Publication information
- Publisher: Marvel Comics
- Formats: Original material for the series has been published as a set of ongoing series.
- Genre: Post-apocalyptic, horror
- Publication date: September 10, 2008 – January 11, 2012
- Number of issues: 31

Creative team
- Writer(s): Roberto Aguirre-Sacasa
- Artist(s): Mike Perkins; Laura Martin

The Stand, published from 2008 to 2012, is a series of comic books by Marvel Comics based on Stephen King's 1978 novel of the same name. Based on the 1990 Complete & Uncut version of the novel, the comic adaptation was written by Roberto Aguirre-Sacasa with art by Mike Perkins and Laura Martin. Its thirty-one issues, divided into six story arcs, completed the telling of the unabridged novel. Stephen King served as Creative and Executive Director of the project.

On March 11, 2009, Marvel began publishing collections for each story arc, and on September 19, 2012, it published a hardcover omnibus edition collecting the adaptation in its entirety, with bonus materials not contained in the original releases.

== Story arcs ==
Arc #	Title	Issue(s)	Date(s)
1	Captain Trips	5	September 10, 2008 – January 28, 2009
2	American Nightmares	5	March 11 – August 19, 2009
3	Soul Survivors	5	October 21, 2009 – March 24, 2010
4	Hardcases	5	June 3 – November 17, 2010
5	No Man's Land	5	February 2 – May 25, 2011
6	The Night Has Come	6	August 10, 2011 – January 11, 2012

== Companion releases ==
Title	Issue(s)	Date(s)
The Stand Sketchbook	1	July 9, 2008

== Collections ==
=== Story arc collections ===
Vol #	Title	Format	ISBN	Release date	Collected material
1	The Stand: Captain Trips	Hardcover	0785136207	March 11, 2009	The Stand: Captain Trips #1–5 and The Stand Sketchbook
1	The Stand: Captain Trips	Paperback	0785135219	August 31, 2011	The Stand: Captain Trips #1–5 and The Stand Sketchbook
2	The Stand: American Nightmares	Hardcover	0785142746	November 11, 2009	The Stand: American Nightmares #1–5
2	The Stand: American Nightmares	Paperback	0785135227	January 18, 2012	The Stand: American Nightmares #1–5
3	The Stand: Soul Survivors	Hardcover	0785136223	July 20, 2010	The Stand: Soul Survivors #1–5
3	The Stand: Soul Survivors	Paperback	0785135235	June 13, 2012	The Stand: Soul Survivors #1–5
4	The Stand: Hardcases	Hardcover	0785136231	March 2, 2011	The Stand: Hardcases #1–5
4	The Stand: Hardcases	Paperback	0785135243	September 19, 2012	The Stand: Hardcases #1–5
5	The Stand: No Man's Land	Hardcover	078513624X	August 10, 2011	The Stand: No Man's Land #1–5
5	The Stand: No Man's Land	Paperback	0785135251	January 15, 2013	The Stand: No Man's Land #1–5
6	The Stand: The Night Has Come	Hardcover	0785136452	February 22, 2012	The Stand: The Night Has Come #1–6
6	The Stand: The Night Has Come	Paperback	0785136460	May 21, 2013	The Stand: The Night Has Come #1–6

=== Omnibus collections ===
Vol #	Title	Format	ISBN	Release date	Collected material
1	The Stand Omnibus	Hardcover	0785153314	September 19, 2012	Story arc collections 1–6
1	The Stand Omnibus Companion	Hardcover	0785153314	September 19, 2012	Bonus material not included in the original individual collections (1–6)

== See also ==
- The Dark Tower (comics)
