= Spellbinder (Bowkett novel) =

Novel by Stephen Bowkett published in 1985

Spellbinder is a novel by Stephen Bowkett published in 1985.

== Plot summary ==
Spellbinder is a novel in which the teenaged protagonist uses actual magic to perform tricks of conjuration.

== Reception ==
Dave Langford reviewed Spellbinder for White Dwarf #67, and stated that "magic and fantasy do not conveniently depart from the hero's life the moment he's been taught some cheap moral lesson: here the poor sod has to learn to live with a responsibility which is his for the next sixty years. Right on."

== Reviews ==
- Review by Nik Morton (1985) in Vector 126
- Review by Anne Gay (1985) in Fantasy Review, August 1985
