= The Stand: Captain Trips =

Comic book series

Publication information
- Publisher: Marvel Comics
- Publication date: September 2008 - January 2009
- No. of issues: 5
- Main character(s): Randall Flagg, Stu Redman, Fran Goldsmith, Larry Underwood

Creative team
- Created by: Stephen King
- Written by: Roberto Aguirre-Sacasa
- Artist: Mike Perkins

The Stand: Captain Trips is a five-issue comic book miniseries, the first of six The Stand series by Marvel Comics, adapting Stephen King's 1978 novel of the same name. It was overseen by King, written by Roberto Aguirre-Sacasa, illustrated by Mike Perkins, and colored by Laura Martin. "Captain Trips" refers to both the title of the first third of The Stand and of a slang term used within the novel for a viral biological weapon that obliterates a significant portion of the world's human population.

A promotional sketchbook for the series was released in July 2007.

== Issues ==
#	Release dates	Description
1	Sep 10, 2008	On a secret army base in the Californian desert, something has gone horribly, terribly wrong. Something that will send Charlie Campion, his wife, and his daughter fleeing in the middle of the night. Unfortunately for the Campion family - and the rest of America - they are unaware that all three of them are carrying a deadly cargo: A virus that will spread from person to person like wildfire, triggering a massive wave of disease and death, prefacing humanity's last stand.
2	Oct 8, 2008	The story continues in this issue as the unseen killer, the super-flu Captain Trips, spreads a tide of disease and death across the entire country. Meanwhile, at the CDC in Atlanta, the US government has taken a keen interest in Stuart Redman, who seems to be the only person immune to the Captain Trips infection. They are determined to find out why - with or without Stu's cooperation. And what do the recurring nightmares Stu's been having - about a dark man with red eyes standing in a cornfield - mean? Plus: Frannie Goldsmith and her father; Larry Underwood in New York; and Nick Andros takes a wrong turn in Shoyo, Arkansas.
3	Nov 12, 2008	As the superflu known as "Captain Trips" continues to spread across America, the lives of major characters such as Larry Underwood and Frannie Goldsmith begin to be affected. As the media begins to catch wind of rumors about chemical warfare and bubonic plague, the actions of the American government begin to devolve, local and global legal systems start to deteriorate, and two wild and crazy outlaws - Lloyd Henreid and Poke Freeman - decide to take advantage of the situation, wreaking a path of destruction through the American southwest.
4	Dec 31, 2008	For Larry Underwood, Nick Andros, and Frannie Goldsmith, the deadly superflu has immediate - and devastating - consequences, striking down people near and dear to their hearts. Meanwhile, Lloyd Henreid gets some grim news from his attorney, and General Starkey is relieved of his duties - in the most definitive way possible. And somewhere far away, but getting closer, the Walkin' Dude is making his presence known...
5	Jan 28, 2009	The violently contagious superflu Captain Trips has now encompassed the entire country in its deadly embrace, and there's no turning back. America is rapidly becoming a country of the sick, the dead, and the damned. Against that ever-darkening backdrop, Randall Flagg, the Walking Dude, the Dark Man, at long last saunters onto the scene. Abandon hope all ye who enter here...

A collected edition of the mini-series was released on March 11, 2009. It included all five issues of the series, as well as the previously released Sketchbook, a comprehensive cover gallery, and additional pages on the series's development (e.g., character sketches, script pages, sketch pages).

== Promotion ==
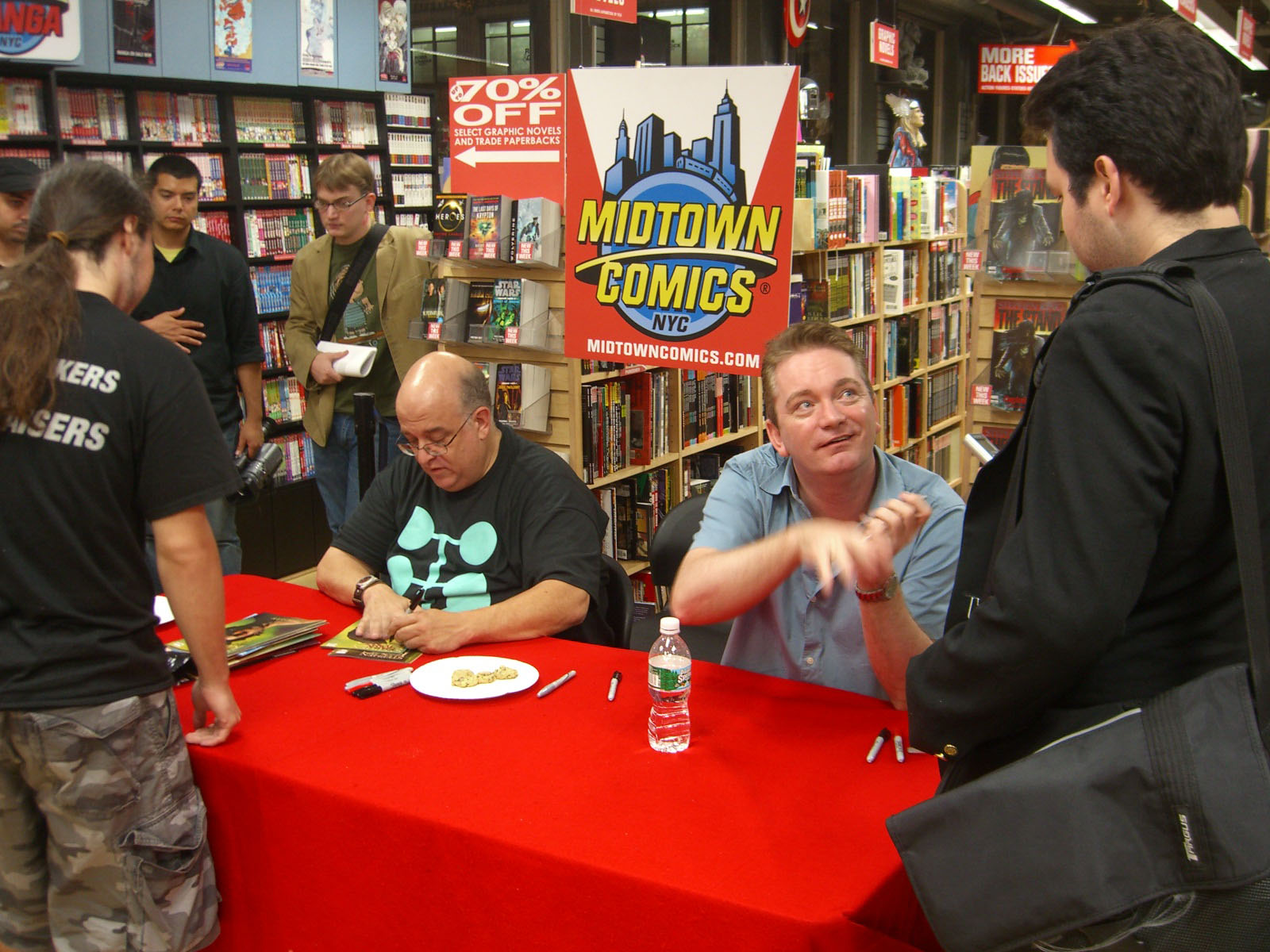
Writer Peter David and artist Mike Perkins, at the midnight signing of The Dark Tower: Treachery and The Stand: Captain Trips at Midtown Comics in Times Square, Manhattan, September 10, 2008. At far right is Alan Kistler of ComicMix, interviewing Perkins.

Artist Mike Perkins appeared at a midnight signing at Midtown Comics in Times Square, Manhattan to promote the book. Perkins appeared with Peter David, the co-writer of Marvel's Dark Tower comics, who was present to promote the publication of The Dark Tower: Treachery.
