= Mike Perkins =

British comic book artist

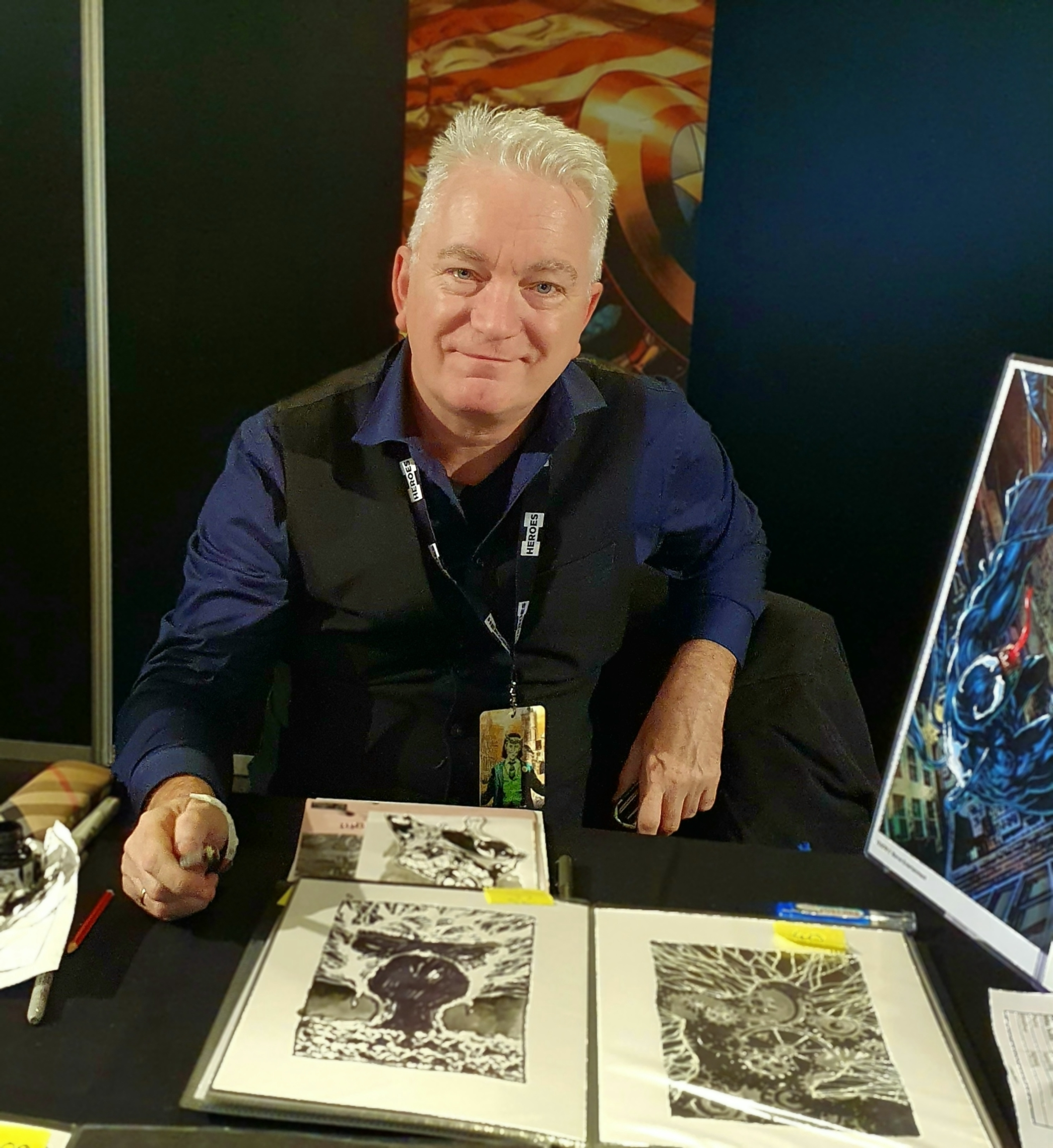
- Perkins at the Belgian convention FACTS on 22 October 2023
- Born: Michael Perkins; 20 November 1969 (age 57) Wolverhampton, United Kingdom
- Areas: Penciller, Artist, Inker
- Notable works: Carver Hale; Kiss Kiss Bang Bang; House of M: Avengers; The Stand

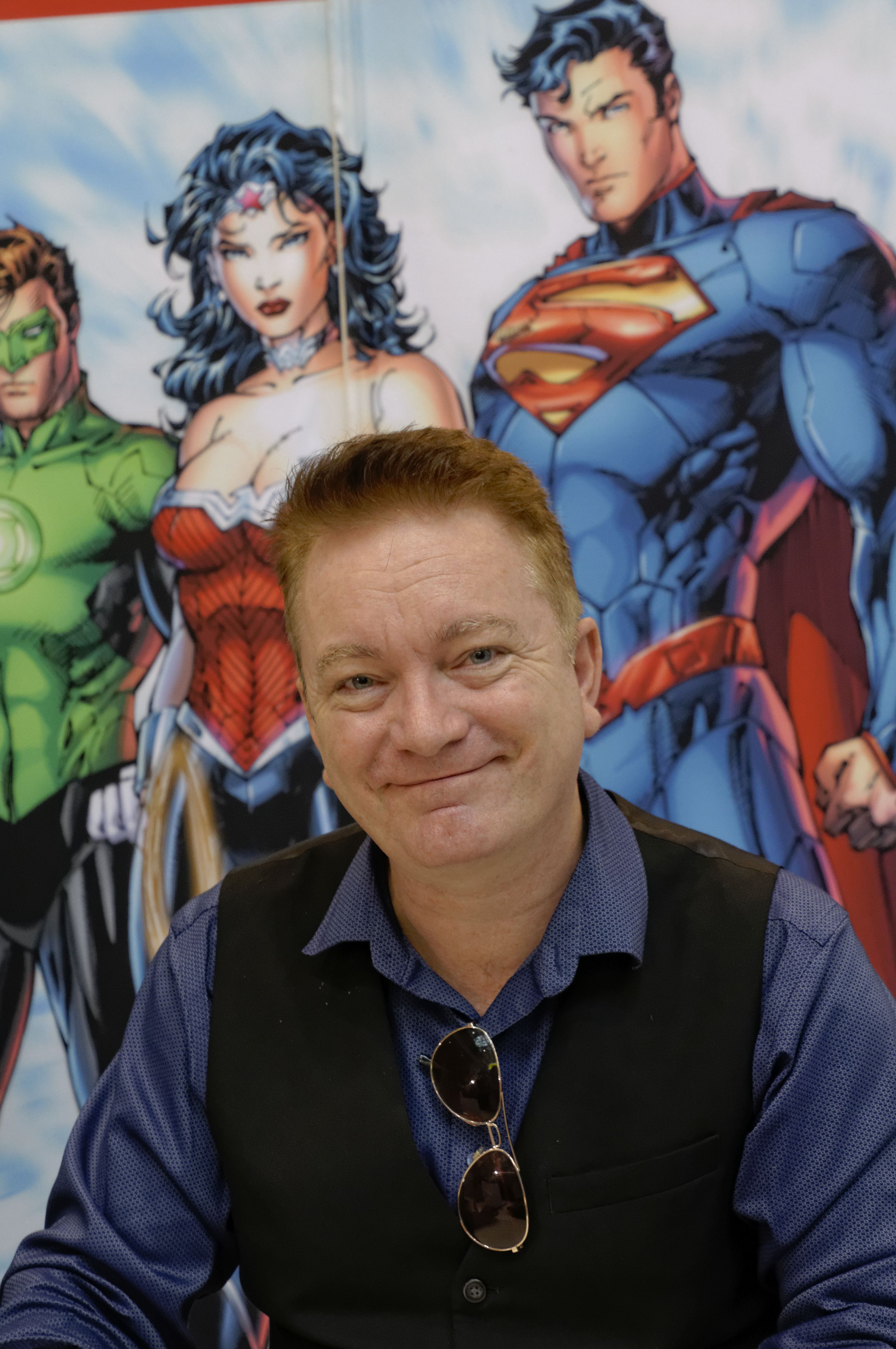
Mike Perkins 2019

Michael Perkins (born 20 November 1969) is a British comic book artist known for his inking work and full art duties on comic books such as Ed Brubaker's run on Captain America, Ruse, Stephen King's The Stand and The Swamp Thing.

== Career ==
Mike Perkins began drawing at a very early age. After attending the Bournville College of Art, Birmingham, England he set himself up as a self-employed artist and pursued work in comics.

As well as illustrating children's books and educational literature, Perkin's career has encompassed computer game design, album covers and business-centered graphic design, although it is probably for his comic book work that he is more widely known.

Perkins' early professional work included work for the British anthology 2000 AD, Marvel UK, Ginn Publishing, Dorling Kindersley and Oxford University Press.

This led to further work in the American market with both DC Comics and Caliber Comics; where he worked on Kilroy is Here, Black Mist, Amongst The Stars, Negative Burn, St. Germaine, Brian Lumley's Necroscope and an adaptation of Doctor Faustus. The latter being a collaboration with Mike Carey, with whom he has worked with throughout his career – most notably on the co-created Carver Hale for 2000 AD and Spellbinders for Marvel Comics.

His first sole inking job, over the pencils of Phil Winslade, led to other inking opportunities at DC and Dark Horse Comics which in turn opened the doors to being asked to join the then new Florida-based comic company CrossGen.

While there, he primarily inked the series Ruse, and worked alongside Mark Waid, Butch Guice and Laura Martin. He also pencilled and inked Archard's Agents and co-created Kiss Kiss Bang Bang with Tony Bedard. He subsequently signed exclusively with Marvel Comics, where he continued to work until May 2018.

At Marvel he has worked on books such as Spider-Man, Fantastic Four, X-Men, Spellbinders, Annihilation: Conquest, House of M: Avengers and Union Jack, but has most notably been part of the artistic team (alongside Steve Epting) on the Ed Brubaker run of Captain America.

From 2008 to 2009, Perkins worked on illustrating The Stand: Captain Trips, Marvel Comics' adaptation of Stephen King's novel The Stand, on which he collaborated once more with colourist Laura Martin.

Since May 2018, Perkins has been working at DC Comics. He has illustrated the limited comic book series Lois Lane: Enemy of the People, and the 16-issue limited series The Swamp Thing with author Ram V from March 2021 to August 2022.

In June 2026, Perkins exhibited original artwork from The Bat-Man: First Knight and The Bat-Man: Second Knight at Swan Hill Studios in Shrewsbury as part of an exhibition entitled Dana, Dana, Dana, Dana... BATMAN!, which explored the influence of local Shropshire landmarks on his depiction of Gotham City.

== Bibliography ==
- Tharg's Future Shocks:
  - "It's a Cold World" (with James Oswald, in 2000 AD No. 865, 1993)
  - "The Star!" (with Peter Hogan, in 2000 AD No. 938, 1995)
- Judge Dredd: "Lethal Response" (with Gordon Rennie, in Judge Dredd Yearbook 1995, 1994
- Tharg's Terror Tales: "A Man Called Fear" (with Martin Conaghan, in 2000AD Yearbook 1995, 1995)
- Negative Burn No. 28, 31, 38–41 (1995–1996)
- Vector 13:
  - "Case Nine: Blackout" (with Dan Abnett, in 2000 AD No. 973, 1996)
  - "Case Five: Patent Pending" (with Gordon Rennie, in 2000 AD #1028, 1997)
- Big Book of (with Jonathan Vankin, Paradox Press):
  - Big Book of Scandal: "...The Ice Cream Blonde" (1998)
  - Big Book of Grimm: "Three Snake Leaves" (1999)
  - Big Book of the 70s: "'Jiggle' Shows" (2000)
- Superman vs. The Terminator: Death to the Future (inks, with writer Alan Grant and pencils by Steve Pugh, 4-issue mini-series, DC Comics and Dark Horse Comics, 2000)
- Green Lantern vs. Aliens (inks, with writer Ron Marz and pencils by Rick Leonardi, DC Comics and Dark Horse Comics, 2000)
- Aliens versus Predator: Xenogenesis (inks, with writer Andi Watson and pencils by Mel Rubi, Dark Horse Comics, 2000)
- Aliens vs. Predator/Witchblade/Darkness: Mindhunter (inks, with writer David Quinn, and pencils by Mel Rubi, Dark Horse Comics, 4-issues miniseries, 2000, trade paperback, 96 pages, 2001, ISBN 1-56971-615-3)
- Carver Hale: Twisting the Knife (with writer Mike Carey and some inks by Dylan Teague, in 2000 AD #1236–1240, 1247–1249, 2001, trade paperback, 2005, ISBN 1-904265-62-6)
- Ruse #1–5, 7–14, 16–19, 21–24, 26 (inks, with writer Mark Waid, and pencils by Jackson Guice, CrossGen, 2001–2004)
- The Life and Time of Ulli & Marquand and Their Misadventures in Mordheim, City of the Damned (with Gordon Rennie, Gavin Thorpe, and Karl Kopinski, Black Library, 80 pages, 2002, ISBN 1-84154-211-3)
- Kiss Kiss Bang Bang (pencils, with writer Tony Bedard and inks by Andrew Hennessy, CrossGen, 2004)
- Spellbinders: Signs and Wonders (pencils, with Mike Carey and inks by Andrew Hennessy, Marvel Comics, 6-issue mini-series, trade paperback, 144 pages, 2005, ISBN 0-7851-1756-3)
- Captain America No. 8, 10–17, 19, 22–24, 26–30, 34–36 (inks, with Ed Brubaker and pencils by Mike Perkins & Steve Epting, Marvel Comics, 2005-ongoing)
- X-Men: Deadly Genesis No. 2 (inks, with Ed Brubaker and pencils by Trevor Hairsine, Marvel Comics, 2006)
- Union Jack: London Falling (pencils, with writer Christos Gage and inks by Andrew Hennessy, 4-issue mini-series, February 2007 – July 2007, trade paperback, 96 pages, July 2007, ISBN 0-7851-2181-1)
- Annihilation: Conquest – Prologue (with Dan Abnett/Andy Lanning, one-shot, Marvel Comics, August 2007)
- House of M: Avengers (with writer Christos Gage, 5-issue mini-series, Marvel Comics, 2008)
- The Stand (with Roberto Aguirre-Sacasa, Marvel, October 2008)
- Origins of Marvel Comics (with Fred Van Lente, one-shot, Marvel Comics, July 2010) short stories:
  - "Moon Knight"
  - "Captain America"
- Rowans Ruin (with Mike Carey)
- Deathlok (with Nathan Edmondson, Marvel Comics, December 2014-September 2015)
- Lois Lane: Enemy of the People (12 issues; 304 pages, 2020, ISBN 1-77950-474-8, with Greg Rucka)
- The Swamp Thing (16 issues; March 2021–August 2022, with Ram V)
- Judge Dredd: "Death of a Judge" (with John Wagner, in 2000 AD # 2464-2469, 2026)
