= Spellbinders =

American comic book series

- Cover to Spellbinders #1. Picture from left to right Mason, Renata, Paul, Kim, Foley, Mink, and Liza Beth. Art by Mike Perkins.

Publication information
- Publisher: Marvel Next (Marvel Comics)
- Schedule: Monthly
- Format: Limited series
- Publication date: March - October 2005
- No. of issues: 6
- Main character: Kimberly "Kim" Vesco

Creative team
- Created by: Mike Carey; Mike Perkins
- Written by: Mike Carey
- Penciller: Mike Perkins
- Inker: Drew Hennessy
- Colorist: GuruFX

Spellbinders is a comic book published by Marvel Comics as part of the Marvel Next comic book branding. Created by writer Mike Carey and artist Mike Perkins, the six-issue limited series debuted in March 2005. It is part of the Marvel Universe but does not feature obvious links to other comic books.

The series is set around John Hathorne High School, a fictional high school in Salem, Massachusetts, where magic is accepted as a fact. There are rivalries between magical students ("wicks") and non-magical students ("blanks"), and between the various covens. The story centers around Kim Vesco, a girl who has strange dreams and an interest in sculpture.

== Development ==
=== Concept and creation ===
At the time Mike Carey was primarily associated with DC Comics, particularly their mature readers Vertigo Comics line and the title Lucifer, he hoped that the series would help him get away from being pigeonholed as a "dark" writer. He referred to the title as a "magical horror fantasy." While Mike Carey was an avowed fan of Joss Whedon television series Buffy the Vampire Slayer and Angel, he stated most of the ideas for the Spellbinders comic book series came from brainstorming sessions with editor Mackenzie Cadenhead, and his recent reading of Garth Nix's Abhorsen fantasy novels. He also denied any similarities to Disney Italy's W.I.T.C.H. or WildStorm's The Intimates.

=== Publication history ===
The first issue of Spellbinders was released on March 23, 2005. Subsequent issues followed monthly, with the second issue released on April 27, the third on May 25, the fourth on June 22, the fifth on July 27, and the sixth on August 24.

The Spellbinders Signs & Wonders Digest trade paperback was released on October 12.

== Synopsis ==
Kim Vespa and her family move to Salem from Chicago. On her first day she meets neighbour Chad Barrow, who tells her she'll be fine in school - as long as she is not a nerd or a 'wick'. Her first day at school is rough; she is attacked by an air elemental, but is saved by two wicks, Mink and Liza Beth. Later at home, she is attacked by a wall. After the wall attacks her Kim discovers that she can talk to ghosts when she spirit-walks and accidentally summons a horde of ghosts. One of the ghosts tells her that she has to weld the Salem covens into a single unit, a Seven. Another ghost warns her 'not to go to the pillar'. At a science class, the bunsen burners explode and the lab catches fire. Kim saves herself by making a mora poultice that smothers the fire. Chad asks her to go to a party; when he asks her about her parents, she mentions that she is adopted. The Salem witches reason that if Kim is adopted, she may be one of them. On the night of the party, they secretly guard her against all forms of magical attack.

At the party, the lights go out and someone attacks Kim with a knife. Realising they have not protected Kim against physical attack, the Salem witches rush to the party just in time to see Kim running from a wolf-monster. Shapeshifter Renata changes into another wolf creature, and the two fight until the thing sees the rest of the witches arriving, turns into a flock of birds and flies away. The Salem witches drag Kim away from the party before the police arrive, and explain the secret history of the witch families of Salem - they are descendants of refugees from 'somewhere else' who came to Salem fleeing the Thief, an occult being. They brought an artifact called the Pillar of Smoke with them, and certain families can work certain kinds of magic. When they offer to take her to the Pillar, Kim declines on the grounds that the ghost told her not to. She goes home, to discover that something trashed her sculpture tools. Meanwhile, Chad is revealed as the one from the party who tried to kill Kim.

Kim finally agrees to go to the Pillar of Smoke and the witches take her to the woods near Salem. They meet Apocaledon, the guardian of the pillar. Along the way, Kim realises that witches have been dying in unusual circumstances involving their powers backfiring and killing them. The group gets to the Pillar, unaware that Chad is following them, and discovers that Kim is a witch - but have no idea what her powers are. Suddenly, the wrecked body of Apocaledon falls into the clearing followed by Chad, who reveals that he is a new version of the Thief, a witch who can copy the powers of other Salem witches. He explains that mutations within the humans of Salem built up over years of interbreeding with the witches eventually culminated in a new Thief. He then easily defeats the group and destroys the Pillar.

When the group wakes up, they find themselves in a washed-out world where their magic does not work fully. They realise that this must be the 'somewhere else' the Salem witches came from. Kim and seer Foley make contact with a ghost, who tells them to apologise to the Pillar. Kim does so; magical energy shoots out of the remains of the Pillar and the pair find themselves in a white space where a line of corpses are guarded by flying skeletons. Meanwhile, the rest of the group encounters the original Thief but escape by pooling their powers and teleporting back to Salem. While they were away Chad has stolen the powers of every witch in town and is using their powers to bring his girlfriend back to life. In the land of the dead Kim and Foley are confronted by the flying skeletons. They tell Kim that she is the Gatekeeper, chosen by the Pillar to guard the way between the lands of the living and dead and mend breaches made by magic. Back in Salem, Chad has resurrected his girlfriend and has Kim's friends trapped within one of their own spells. They break free just as Kim and Foley arrive. The whole group confronts with Chad; using her necromancy powers, Kim first frees Chad's girlfriend from his control and then lets her die again. Because she is bound to him, Chad dies as well. In the afterlife, Chad is punished by the skeletons for raising the dead and the girlfriend is taken to the next life.

The group of witches leave the school. Before she leaves, Kim notices a small lizard - one of the first witch casualties, a wick boy who died the night Kim was summoned to Salem. She tells it to hold on, as things are starting to work out.

== Literary reception ==
=== Critical response ===
Mario McKellop of FanSided highlighted the Spellbinders comic book series in their ""5 Obscure Marvel Comics that Could Be Great TV Shows" list as a potential standout for adaptation into television, noting its blend of young adult genre elements such as secretly malevolent romantic interests, coming-of-age drama, and high school events set against apocalyptic backdrops.

=== Sales ===
According to Diamond Comic Distributors, Spellbinders #1 ranked as the 97th best-selling comic book in March 2005. The following issue was the 122nd best-selling comic in April 2005. The third one was the 133rd best-selling comic in May 2005. Furthermore, the Spellbinders Signs & Wonders Digest TPB was the 82nd best-selling graphic novel in October 2005.

=== Accolades ===
The Spellbinders comic book series was nominated for the Great Graphic Novel Award at the 2006 Young Adult Library Services Association.

== Collected editions ==
Title	Material collected	Published date	ISBN
Spellbinders: Signs and Wonders	Spellbinders #1-6	October 26, 2005	9780785117568
Spellbinders: Signs and Wonders	Spellbinders #1-6	July 11, 2012	9780785164883
