= List of Shippensburg University alumni =

This is a list of notable alumni of Shippensburg University in Shippensburg Township, Cumberland County, Pennsylvania.

== Athletics ==
- Carl Barger, founding president of the Miami Marlins
- Rob Davis, former National Football League long-snapper; current assistant head coach for the Dallas Cowboys
- Chris Flook, former Bermuda Olympic swimmer, 1992 Summer Olympics
- Phil Galiano, assistant special teams coach for the New Orleans Saints
- Dave Geyer, university swim team coach for Louisiana State University
- Brent Grimes, former National Football League cornerback for the Tampa Bay Buccaneers
- Ron Johnson, former National Football League defensive end, Philadelphia Eagles
- John Kuhn, former National Football League fullback, New Orleans Saints, Green Bay Packers
- Dustin Sleva, professional basketball player for Beşiktaş of the Turkish Basketbol Süper Ligi
- Steve Spence, former United States Olympic long-distance runner, 1992 Summer Olympics; bronze medalist, 1991 IAAF World Championships in Athletics

== Government ==
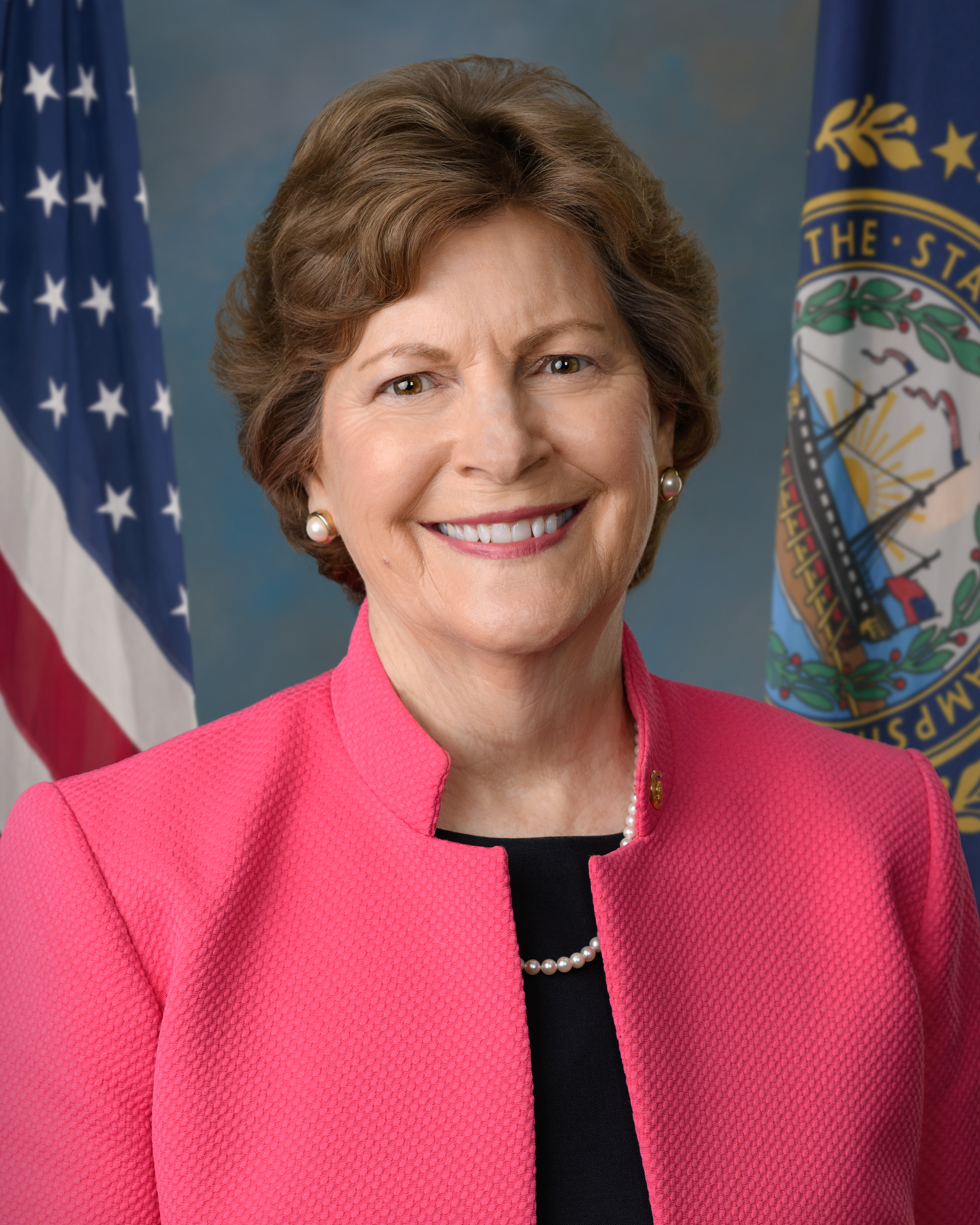
Jeanne Shaheen

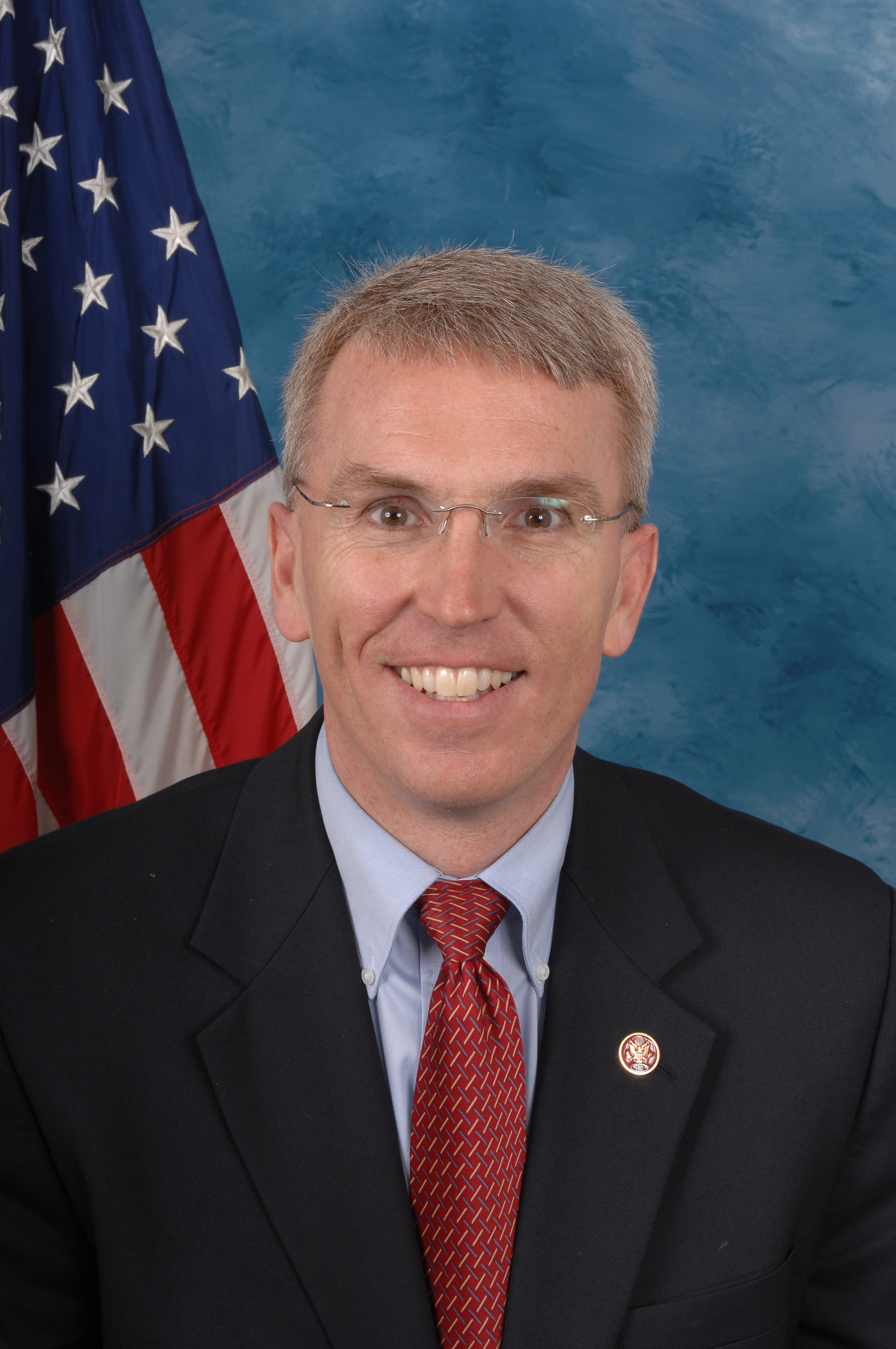
Todd Platts

- Richard Alloway, Pennsylvania state senator
- Lisa Baker, Pennsylvania state senator
- Ray Boland, secretary of the Wisconsin Department of Veterans Affairs
- Jeffrey W. Coy, former member, Pennsylvania House of Representatives; commissioner, Pennsylvania Gaming Control Board (2004–2018)
- Ronald Crimm, member, Kentucky House of Representatives
- Dell L. Dailey, ambassador, coordinator for counterterrorism, United States Department of State
- Richard Dietz, justice, Supreme Court of North Carolina
- Cindy Adams Dunn, secretary, Pennsylvania Department of Conservation and Natural Resources
- Clay Ford, former member of the Arkansas House of Representatives (1975–1976), and the Florida House of Representatives (2007–2013)
- Ruth E. Hodge, retired archivist, U.S. Army and Pennsylvania State Archives
- John Kline, U.S. congressman from Minnesota (2003–2017)
- Robert L. Myers (1862–1943), member of the Pennsylvania House of Representatives
- Todd Platts, U.S. congressman from Pennsylvania 19th District (2001–2013), judge, York County Court of Common Pleas (2014–present)
- Andrew A. Serafini, member, Maryland House of Delegates (2008–present)
- Jeanne Shaheen, first woman to be elected governor of New Hampshire (1997–2003) and U.S. senator from New Hampshire (2009–present)
- Todd Stephens, Pennsylvania House of Representatives 151st District (2010–present)

== Entertainment and media ==
- Don Falcone, musician and producer
- John Hamilton, actor
- Jonathan Koch, producer
- Chris Raab a.k.a. "Raab Himself", television personality
- Lil Skies, hip hop artist
- Jordan White, rock musician

== Military ==
- General John N. Abrams, commanding general of the United States Army's Training and Doctrine Command
- Brigadier General John Bahnsen, Vietnam War veteran, recipient of the Distinguished Service Cross and 5 Silver Stars
- Lieutenant General William G. Boykin, United States deputy undersecretary of Defense for Intelligence (retired)
- Colonel Eugene R. Brady, Navy Cross recipient
- Brigadier General Ralph T. Browning, former commander of 58th Fighter Wing, USAF and a POW of the Vietnam War
- Lieutenant General Hasan Mashhud Chowdhury, 11th commander of the Bangladesh Army
- Lieutenant General George R. Christmas, commander of I Marine Expeditionary Force and Navy Cross recipient
- Lieutenant General Johnnie H. Corns, commander of United States Army Pacific
- Lieutenant General James W. Crysel, commander Second United States Army and 25th Infantry Division
- Brigadier General Pat Foote, first female brigade commander in Europe, first female inspector general for Army, first female commander of Fort Belvoir
- General John William Foss, commanding general of the United States Army's Training and Doctrine Command
- General Tommy Franks, commander of the U.S. Central Command, American occupation forces in Iraq (retired)
- Lieutenant General Jay Garner, director of Reconstruction and Humanitarian Assistance for Iraq
- General Ronald Houston Griffith, vice chief of staff of the United States Army (VCSA) from 1995 to 1997
- Lieutenant General James R. Hall, final commanding officer of the Fourth United States Army
- Lieutenant General William Hardin Harrison, commander of I Corps and 7th Infantry Division
- Major General Orris E. Kelly, 14th chief of Chaplains of the United States Army
- Lieutenant General Guy A. J. LaBoa, commanded the 4th Infantry Division and First United States Army
- Lieutenant General John M. LeMoyne, commander 3rd Infantry Division, U.S. Army Infantry Center, contributed to the quick end of the Persian Gulf War
- General David D. McKiernan, four-star general, U.S. Army commander, International Security Assistance Force (ISAF)
- Lieutenant General David Melcher, former president and CEO, The Aerospace Industries Association, USAA Bank board of directors
- Major General Patrick A. Murphy, Adjutant General of New York
- Lieutenant General Burton D. Patrick, commander of the 101st Airborne Division
- Lieutenant General Kenneth L. Peek Jr., commander of Strategic Air Command
- General Dennis Reimer, 33rd chief of staff of the Army, Distinguished Flying Cross recipient
- General Thomas C. Richards, chief of staff, Supreme Headquarters Allied Powers Europe
- Lieutenant General Michael Rochelle, Army deputy chief of staff
- Major General Charles Calvin Rogers, Medal of Honor recipient of the Vietnam War
- Lieutenant General Roger C. Schultz, lieutenant general and director of the Army National Guard, 1998–2005
- Brigadier General Andrew M. Schuster, U.S. National Guard brigadier general
- Major General Sidney Shachnow, United States Army, twice awarded the Silver Star, Holocaust survivor
- Lieutenant General Robert L. Schweitzer, Distinguished Service Cross recipient
- John W. Shannon, U.S. secretary of the Army, 1984–1989, U.S. under secretary of the Army, 1989–1993
- General Carl Stiner, commander, United States Special Operations Command
- Lieutenant General Herbert R. Temple Jr., chief of the National Guard Bureau, 1986–1990
- Lieutenant General Michael S. Tucker, commanding general of the First United States Army
- Major General Abraham J. Turner (retired), former executive director for the Department of Employment and Workforce in South Carolina
- Lieutenant General Clyde A. Vaughn, director of the Army National Guard
- General Carl E. Vuono, commanding general of the United States Army's Training and Doctrine Command
- Lieutenant General Calvin Waller, former commander of military operations for CENTCOM during the Persian Gulf War
- Major General Kevin R. Wendel, commanding general of First United States Army
- Lieutenant General Robert M. Collins, Director of the United States Army Acquisition Corps

== Literature ==
- Jessica James, historical fiction author
- Justin Jordan, comics writer
- Dean Koontz, author, New York Times best seller

== Business and education ==
- Michele Buck, chairman, president and CEO, The Hershey Company
- Candace Introcaso, president, La Roche College
- Tom Jackson Jr., Ph.D., president, California State Polytechnic University, Humboldt
- Samuel A. Kirkpatrick, president emeritus of the University of Texas at San Antonio
- William E. Klunk, psychiatrist and Alzheimer's researcher at the University of Pittsburgh
- Jesús E. Maldonado, geneticist at the Smithsonian Institution
- Kevin J. Manning, Ph.D., president, Stevenson University
