= Robert Myers =

Robert or Bob Myers may refer to:

== Politics ==
- Robert Myers Jr. (born 1983), American state senator in Alaska
- Robert L. Myers (1862–1943), American politician from Pennsylvania
- Robert L. Myers (politician) (1928–1993), American politician in Pennsylvania
- Robert Edward William Myers (1947–2008), Canadian politician in Saskatchewan
- Robert Hill Myers (1856–1922), Canadian politician and judge in Manitoba

== Sports ==
=== American football ===
- Robert Myers (offensive lineman) (born 1991), American offensive lineman
- Robert L. Myers (coach) (1887–1953), American football coach
- Bobby Myers (American football) (born 1976), American football player

=== Other sports ===
- Bob Myers (born 1975), sports executive and former college basketball player
- Bob Myers (footballer) (1930–2020), Australian rules footballer
- Bobby Myers (racing driver) (1927–1957), American stock car driver

== Others ==
- Robert Myers (physicist), theoretical physicist
- Robert J. Myers (1912–2010), American actuary who co-created the American Social Security program
- Robert E. Myers (record producer) (1912–1976), classical producer and artists & repertoire specialist
- Robert ÆOLUS Myers, American composer, performer and producer
- Robert Manson Myers, author; winner of a National Book Award

== See also ==
- Robert Meyer (disambiguation)
- Robert Meyers (disambiguation)
