= Kevin Manning =

Kevin Manning may refer to:

- Kevin Manning (bishop) (born 1933), Bishop Emeritus of Roman Catholic Diocese of Parramatta, Australia
- Kevin Manning (jockey) (born 1967), Irish jockey
- Kevin J. Manning (born 1944), President of Stevenson University
