= Route 666 (comics) =

Series of horror comic books

- Cover of first issue, published in July 2002

Publication information
- Publisher: CrossGen
- Schedule: Monthly
- Format: Ongoing series
- Publication date: July 2002 - June 2004
- No. of issues: 22
- Main character(s): Cassie; Sheriff Cisco; The Adversary; Chairman Suvorov (Pinky); Too-Too; Special Agent Gunnar Melchior; J. Elgar Purvis; Braathwaate; Tenebrion; Helene Mengert; Dr. Malachi Waterman; Doctor Melchior; Beasely; Berkely (Railsplitter)

Creative team
- Created by: Mark Alessi; Gina M. Villa
- Written by: Tony Bedard
- Penciller: Karl Moline

Route 666 is a comic book series published by American company CrossGen Entertainment starting from July 2002. Written by Tony Bedard and drawn by Karl Moline, it was CrossGen's first horror comic venture, and contained a blend of action, menace and humor. It ended at issue #22 in June 2004, as part of CrossGen's bankruptcy.

== Setting ==
Route 666 takes place on the fictional planet of Erebus in a country called The United States of Empyrean, which mimics the innocent feel and the actual mindset, lifestyles and technology of the USA in the 1950s. A feud with the People's Republic of Rodina, presumably a combination of Russia and China, mirrors the Cold War between capitalism and communism (Rodina is Russian for "motherland").

== Plot summary ==
The lead character, Cassie Heloise Starkweather, had been able to see dead people from childhood but repressed the ability. As a college student, Cassie had inadvertently caused the death of her college roommate and teammate, Helene, through carelessness. Helen's ghost appears to her and tells her that spirits from another world, agents of "The Adversary", possess the bodies of people in this world and kidnap the souls of those who die violently, which is a food source to them. Two of these dark spirits overhear this conversation and drag her friend away. Cassie can see past the disguises and to her these agents appear as B-movie monsters or creatures of local legend. To others, they appear human. People find it difficult to accept the existence of a world of soul-stealing monsters and refuse to believe her.

Riddled with guilt and declared unstable by a Doctor Melchior, Cassie is dispatched to Melchior Asylum where she learns that half the staff is made up of these soul-stealers. Cassie escapes while killing a few of these agents. These deaths and murders the agents themselves commit are all attributed to Cassie, making her appear to be a serial killer.

She has problems finding allies. One person who does believe her is a serial killer known as the "Railsplitter".

As Cassie flees from local, state and federal law enforcement authorities, she brings misfortune to the small county of Gossmer. Cisco, the local sheriff, recognizes her as the accused murderer reported on the news. Cassie steals his squad car; Cisco wants to give chase in his son's truck, but his son Miguel insists he is the only one who can drive it. While in pursuit, her car loses control and they all crash, leading to Miguel's death.

Cisco becomes her most supportive "compadre", and he even shelters her. She also encounters a circus, finds her hometown infested with agents, moves through the bayou country of the Deep South, into the midwestern heartland, and is taken to the capital city of Rodina.

Completion of the story arc was interrupted by the bankruptcy of the comic's publisher, CrossGen.
