= Green Lantern: New Guardians =

2011–2015 American comic book series

- Cover for Green Lantern: New Guardians #1 (November 2011), art by Tyler Kirkham, Batt and Rod Reis.

Publication information
- Publisher: DC Comics
- Schedule: Monthly
- Genre: Superhero
- Publication date: September 2011 – March 2015
- Main character(s): Arkillo; Atrocitus; Fatality; Larfleeze; Kyle Rayner; Saint Walker; Bleez

Creative team
- Written by: Tony Bedard, Justin Jordan
- Penciller(s): Tyler Kirkham, Amilcar Pinna, Andrei Bressan, Aaron Kuder, Andres Guinaldo and Brad Walker
- Inker(s): Matt Banning and Andrew Hennessey
- Colorist(s): Neil Ruffino and Rod Reis

Green Lantern: New Guardians is an American comic book series originally written by Tony Bedard with art by Tyler Kirkham and Batt and published by DC Comics.

The team consists of representatives of each of the Corps that tap into a particular portion of the emotional spectrum. Its original members were Kyle Rayner (Green Lantern Corps), Arkillo (Sinestro Corps), Bleez (Red Lantern Corps), Glomulus (Orange Lantern Corps), Munk (Indigo Tribe), Saint Walker (Blue Lantern Corps) and Fatality (Star Sapphires). The group disbands in issue #0 (September 2012), and reforms in issue #13 with Kyle, Arkillo, and new members Carol Ferris and Atrocitus. Larfleeze joins in issue #15.

== Publication history ==
In September 2011, The New 52 rebooted DC's continuity. In this new timeline, Green Lantern: New Guardians debuted as part of the new "Green Lantern" family of titles. Other titles initially included in the family were Green Lantern, Green Lantern Corps and Red Lanterns. Larfleeze was added to the group from August 2013 to June 2014, and Sinestro was added in April 2014.

The series crossed over with Blue Beetle (vol. 9) #9 in May 2012, and was part of the "Rise of the Third Army" storyline running through the Green Lantern titles from October 2012 to January 2013.

Andrei Bressan and Amilcar Pinna handled the art duties from issue #13 to #14, while Aaron Kuder and Andres Guinaldo contributed to issues #15 to #20. Beginning with issue #21 in June 2013, the creative team became Justin Jordan and Brad Walker. The title also was part of the "Lights Out" crossover.

== Plot ==
After Lanterns from various Corps are suddenly and mysteriously decommissioned, their rings seek a replacement. They fly to Earth, where Green Lantern Kyle Rayner is selected by the rings to join the six other Corps. He is immediately attacked by Sinestro Corps member Arkillo, Red Lantern Bleez, Indigo Tribesman Munk and Star Sapphire Fatality, who think Kyle is a "ring thief". Blue Lantern Saint Walker arrives and aids Kyle. The two flee to Oa seeking answers, and they are pursued by their attackers. Assuming he acquired the rings by foul play, Kyle is attacked by the Guardians. He briefly holds them at bay by utilizing the power of his new rings, but is only able to escape with the aid of Saint Walker, the Lanterns who had been pursuing him, and Orange Lantern Larfleeze.

The group recovers at Larfleeze's home, where he tells them he identified the source of the rings' attraction to Kyle. Bleez returns to the headquarters of the Red Lanterns, and the other five leave Larfleeze to investigate, accompanied by one of Larfleeze's constructs. They locate a space station the size of a solar system, and during their investigation they are attacked by Archangel Invictus, the ruler of the space station. He accuses them of conspiring with "the Beast", referring to a statue of Larfleeze.

As Saint Walker faces him, Invictus reveals that he is the last of a species of angelic beings who sought to bring the light to the universe before Larfleeze attacked them. Unable to absorb the rapidly ascending spirits of the angels into his Corps, Larfleeze hunted Invictus's race to extinction, trapping him on the other side of the other-universal portal that Invictus sought to use to banish Larfleeze. Having returned, Invictus intends to kill Larfleeze and destroy the Vega system, replacing it with the Orrery he has constructed, containing duplicates of the worlds that were lost and "corrupted" by Larfleeze. He also reveals that he had nothing to do with their vanishing rings, suggesting that Larfleeze set the event up to trick the other Corps into doing his work for him. Despite Kyle protesting that Larfleeze alone was not responsible for what has happened to the Vega system since Invictus's time, citing the current teamwork of the seven ring-wielders as proof that miracles can happen, Invictus only agrees to let the 'New Guardians' go if Kyle kills Larfleeze.

With their power running low after they depart the Orrery, the 'team' split up to recharge. Bleez accompanies Kyle to Earth to recover his power battery, wondering at his continued ownership of a green ring and access to the Green Lantern database despite his "expulsion", while Fatality and Walker return to their Corps' respective homeworlds. Meanwhile, Munk is recalled to the Indigo Tribe, leaving Arkillo, now one of the last Sinestro Corps members after Sinestro captured and destroyed the Central Power Battery, to receive an independent but potentially unstable new battery from the Weaponer of Qward.

While Kyle recharges his ring on Earth, he and Bleez are attacked by a bounty hunter who is trying to collect a reward the Guardians have put on Kyle. Although Glomulus is apparently destroyed, Kyle and Bleez are aided by Blue Beetle, who tells them Odym, the homeworld of the Blue Lanterns, is under siege by the Reach. Saint Walker rallies the other Blue Lanterns to repel the Reach while Kyle contacts the other New Guardians for help. Despite aid from Kyle, Arkillo and Fatality (Bleez having returned to the Red Lanterns and Munk being presumably occupied back on Nok), Odym falls to the Reach. Saint Walker believes its secret location was revealed to the Reach by Larfleeze, and the New Guardians go to confront him. However, upon confronting Larfleeze, who has just regenerated the previously dispersed Glomulus, he reveals that he had no part in the attack on the Blue Lanterns, before attempting to consume the New Guardians himself. Munk is able to disrupt the Orange Lanterns by tapping into the Orange light, but the fight is ended when Invictus attacks the Vega system, forcing the Guardians to focus on the more immediate threat.

They defeat Invictus by relocating his ship while he is fighting them on Vega, depriving him of his power source. Sayd reveals she was responsible for the rings of weaker Lanterns abandoning their bearers to travel to Kyle, intending for Kyle to unite the Corps to save Ganthet. Sayd claims her actions were performed in a moment of stress-induced insanity. The team disperses, disgusted by her method to unite the Corps.

At Ferris Aircraft, Carol Ferris is looking for signs of Hal Jordan's return and encounters Thomas Kalmaku working late, and the two decide to search Hal's locker to see if he stopped by to recharge his ring. Just as they find an engagement ring inside, Kyle arrives in search of Hal in order to ask for advice about the Guardians of the Universe. Thomas brings the two's attention to a news report about Hal and Sinestro's fight with Black Hand. Kyle and Carol leave, with the latter transforming into Star Sapphire. They arrive at Coast City Cemetery and help the police dispatch zombies left by Black Hand. After sensing the explosion of Sinestro's Power Battery, the dead attack again and as they overwhelm the two, Kyle is able to channel the powers of green and blue energy and dispatch them. Kyle's ring informs him the Hal is dead but Carol's feelings for him and her abilities as a Star Sapphire reveal he is alive. She connects with Kyle and they witness his future, which shows the latter in various different uniforms of the other Lantern Corps. Kyle is skeptical about his ability to combine all the colors of the Emotional Spectrum but Carol believes that he can save Hal with it. Halfway across the universe, the Guardians of the Universe meet with the Zamarons who have discovered the former's schemes. Instead of trying to stop them, the Zamarons decide to aid the Guardians.

Having already mastered hope, Kyle begins his training with Atrocitus in order to harness the power of rage. Atrocitus fights Kyle at Green-Wood Cemetery, believing that the latter will be able to access his rage powers if he is being fought at the location of Alexandra DeWitt's grave. Kyle instead feels sad and Atrocitus decides to take him to a war-torn country. Atrocitus holds Kyle back and forces him to watch a man being murdered in front of his son. Kyle unlocks rage and transforms into a Red Lantern, killing all the soldiers. He tries to fight Atrocitus but is knocked down by the latter and reverts into a Green Lantern. Atrocitus leaves to attend to his own business and Kyle uses the blue energies of hope to heal the nearby citizens. Kyle returns to the cemetery to find that Carol has restored Alex's grave. Kyle shows indifference to Carol and Alex's grave and decides to leave to harness the orange light of avarice. In Sector 2189, the Guardian's Third Army begins converting more people into their ranks. In Sector 538, Indigo-1 is able to help Kyle harness the indigo light of compassion. Carol returns to Planet Zamaron where she is scolded for not obeying their orders. She counters that she was doing her duty as a Star Sapphire and is helping Kyle. The Zamarons allow her to continue but unbeknownst to Carol, she is being used by the Guardians to track Kyle since they can no longer tack his ring. On Planet Vorn, Kyle arrives to seek training from Arkillo. Arkillo's worshipers point him to the forest where Kyle finds Arkillo. After baiting him with constructs of Sinestro, Kyle fights Arkillo. Kyle is able to harness the yellow light of fear when he admits that he is always scared and transforms into a Yellow Lantern. Once Carol arrives, Kyle reverts into a Green Lantern and the duo head to Okaara, with Arkillo joining them so that he may kill Sinestro and become the greatest fear Lantern of all. In Sector 2828, a group of Zamarons witness the Guardian's Third Army assimilate members of the Spider Guild. Kyle and the group arrive at Okaara where they are greeted by Sayd. Larfleeze initially refuses to help Kyle unlock avarice but when Carol uses her powers to discover Larfleeze's heartache and that his family is still alive, Larfleeze agrees to help. Larfleeze tells Kyle that if he wants to unlock avarice, he must take the Orange Lantern Central Power Battery from him and charge his ring with it. Kyle uses the various other powers he's unlocked to help him but everyone is surprised by the arrival of the Third Army. Carol and the others decide to fend them off and Kyle takes the Power Battery and charges his ring, unlocking the orange light of avarice. Larfleeze tries the pry the Power Battery from Kyle's grasp just as he is being consumed by avarice. Carol succeeds in separating Kyle from it and he's returned to his senses by a Star Sapphire construct of Alex DeWitt. Sayd holds off the Third Army as Kyle and the others teleport away. At their sanctum, the Guardians watch as Sayd is seemingly killed by the Third Army. Ganthet, unfazed by this, decides he will deal with Kyle personally. On Planet Zamaron, Kyle is trying to unlock the violet light of love through a dream-like experience as he encounters several moments in his past such as: his father leaving him, a date with Alex, and celebrating Ganthet's one billionth birthday. The Zamaron Queen reveals to a fellow Star Sapphire that their alliance with the Guardians is a ruse in order to find a weakness in them. Kyle is awakened and heads off to rendezvous with Carol and the others. However, he is confronted by Ganthet and the two battle, with Kyle trying to use the various powers of the Emotional Spectrum to beat him. The Zamarons and Star Sapphires arrive to aid Kyle just as Carol and the others do. While momentarily distracted by the arrival of the Third Army, Kyle is fatally struck by Ganthet. Kyle begins to accept that love is not a weakness and is able to access the power of love. As he does, Kyle has mastered all seven colors of the emotional spectrum and transforms into a White Lantern, destroying the Third Army on Zamaron and causing Ganthet to flee. With his new powers, Kyle decides to take the fight to Oa.

An unmasked Kyle wakes up in his apartment to find himself confronted by Volthoom, the First Lantern. Volthoom is intrigued about Kyle and begins to unravel is timeline, sending Kyle to an alternate reality where Alex is alive and Kyle gave Ganthet the Green Lantern Power Ring back. Kyle's White Lantern Power Ring manifests and Kyle does not accept the new reality Volthoom created. Volthoom creates a second reality for Kyle where he left with his father and the two work together at a father-son auto shop. When Kyle confronts a police officer that his father paid off, Kyle is met by Volthoom who sends him to another reality where Earth was ravaged by the Sinestro Corps and it is somehow Kyle's fault. Just as that realities Guy Gardner is about to fire on Kyle, Volthoom freezes reality and allows Kyle to choose which reality he wishes to live in. Kyle chooses the first reality but Volthoom refuses to and leaves him with the knowledge that things could've been better. Volthoom begins to warp reality with Kyle's allies: he puts Carol in a reality where she is still a pilot, two realities for Larfleeze in which in one he rejoins his family and in another he took Hal Jordan's Blue Power Ring and became a Blue Lantern, and a reality where Saint Walker became a Green Lantern. Despite it, all three remember their true reality and push back.

In Sector 1417, Kyle and Carol find the remains of the planet Korugar. Three hours earlier, Carol finds Kyle in his apartment after his encounter with Volthoom. Kyle tries to contact Arkillo, Saint Walker, and Indigo-1 in order to warn them of Volthoom but they have already encounter him. Kyle's ring reveals it has located Sinestro and the two head to Korugar. The two are then confronted by Sinestro who believes that Kyle is working for Volthoom as he began to accuse the White Lantern. He reveals that Hal Jordan is dead, and is restrained by the newly arrived Green Lanterns B'dg and Simon Baz. Kyle tries to resurrect Korugar and its people with the white ring but fails to. Sinestro takes the white ring for himself but it leaves him because he was deemed as an unsuitable host and chooses Simon Baz. Simon tries to resurrect Korugar but fails as he was also deemed as an unsuitable host, while the ring returns to Kyle. Sinestro retrieves his Yellow Lantern Power Battery and departs to kill Volthoom as a revenge.

During the final fight against Volthoom, Kyle arrives with the Blue Lanterns, Indigo Tribe, and Star Sapphires to aid in the fight. When Hal Jordan returns as a Black Lantern, Carol is shocked by this and asks Kyle if he can resurrect him but he doubts he can since he can only heal people, not resurrect them. Kyle and the other New Guardians watch as Volthoom is defeated once and for all. In a possible future, the Bookkeeper reveals that Kyle will be visited by millions of people in order to by healed by his powers, and he is content with his new civic duty. After the events of Wrath of the First Lantern, Kyle is painting artworks of every member of the New Guardians. Six hours before that, he is met by Saint Walker and the two recount the events that brought them all together. After using his powers to bring peace and healing to various different locations, Kyle heads to Arizona where he reconciles with his father. Outside the galaxy, Ganthet and Sayd begin their second chance at life as the former reflects on how he and Kyle brought out the best in one another.

== Reception ==
New Guardians was ranked as the eleventh best selling book in September 2011 by units, and received mostly positive reviews.

== Collected editions ==
Title	Collects	Pages/ Cover	Published	ISBN
Green Lantern: New Guardians Vol. 1: The Ring Bearer	Green Lantern: New Guardians #1-7	160 pages, Hardcover 160 pages, Paperback	October 23, 2012 August 6, 2013	ISBN 1-4012-3707-X ISBN 1-4012-3708-8
Green Lantern: New Guardians, Vol. 2: Beyond Hope	Green Lantern: New Guardians #8-12 Blue Beetle (Vol.9) #9	144 pages, Hardcover 144 pages, Paperback	August 6, 2013 February 4, 2014	ISBN 1-4012-4077-1 ISBN 1-4012-4293-6
Green Lantern: New Guardians, Vol. 3: Love & Death	Green Lantern: New Guardians #0, #13-20,	288 pages, Hardcover 288 pages, Paperback	February 4, 2014 July 8, 2014	ISBN 1-4012-4406-8 ISBN 1-4012-4710-5
Green Lantern: New Guardians, Vol. 4: Gods and Monsters	Green Lantern: New Guardians #21-27	200 pages, Paperback	September 2, 2014	ISBN 1-4012-4746-6
Green Lantern: New Guardians, Vol. 5: Godkillers	Green Lantern: New Guardians #28-34, Annual #2	200 pages, Paperback	February 24, 2015	ISBN 1-4012-5088-2
Green Lantern: New Guardians, Vol. 6: Storming The Gates	Green Lantern: New Guardians #35-40	160 pages, Paperback	August 25, 2015	ISBN 1-4012-5477-2

Other Appearances

Title	Collects	Pages/ Cover	Published	ISBN
Blue Beetle Vol. 2: Blue Diamond	Green Lantern: New Guardians #9 and Blue Beetle vol. 9 #7-12	240 pages, Paperback,	April 30, 2013	ISBN 1-4012-3850-5
Green Lantern : Rise of the Third Army	Green Lantern (Vol.5) Annual #1, #13-16 Green Lantern Corps (Vol.3) #13-16, Annual #1, Green Lantern: New Guardians #13-16 Red Lanterns #13-16	416 pages, Hardcover 416 pages, Paperback	September 10, 2013 March 25, 2014	ISBN 1-4012-4499-8 ISBN 1-4012-4613-3
Green Lantern: Wrath of the First Lantern	Green Lantern (Vol.5) #17-20 Green Lantern Corps (Vol.3) #17-20 Green Lantern: New Guardians #17-20 Red Lantern #17-20	416 pages, Hardcover 416 pages, Paperback	February 25, 2014 August 19, 2014	ISBN 1-4012-4409-2 ISBN 1-4012-4693-1
Green Lantern: Lights Out	Green Lantern (Vol.5) #24, Annual #2, #23.1 Relic Green Lantern Corps (Vol.3) #24 Green Lantern: New Guardians #23-24 Red Lanterns #24	192 pages, Hardcover 192 pages, Paperback	June 24, 2014 December 30, 2014	ISBN 1-4012-4816-0 ISBN 1-4012-4943-4
