= Justin Jordan =

American comics writer

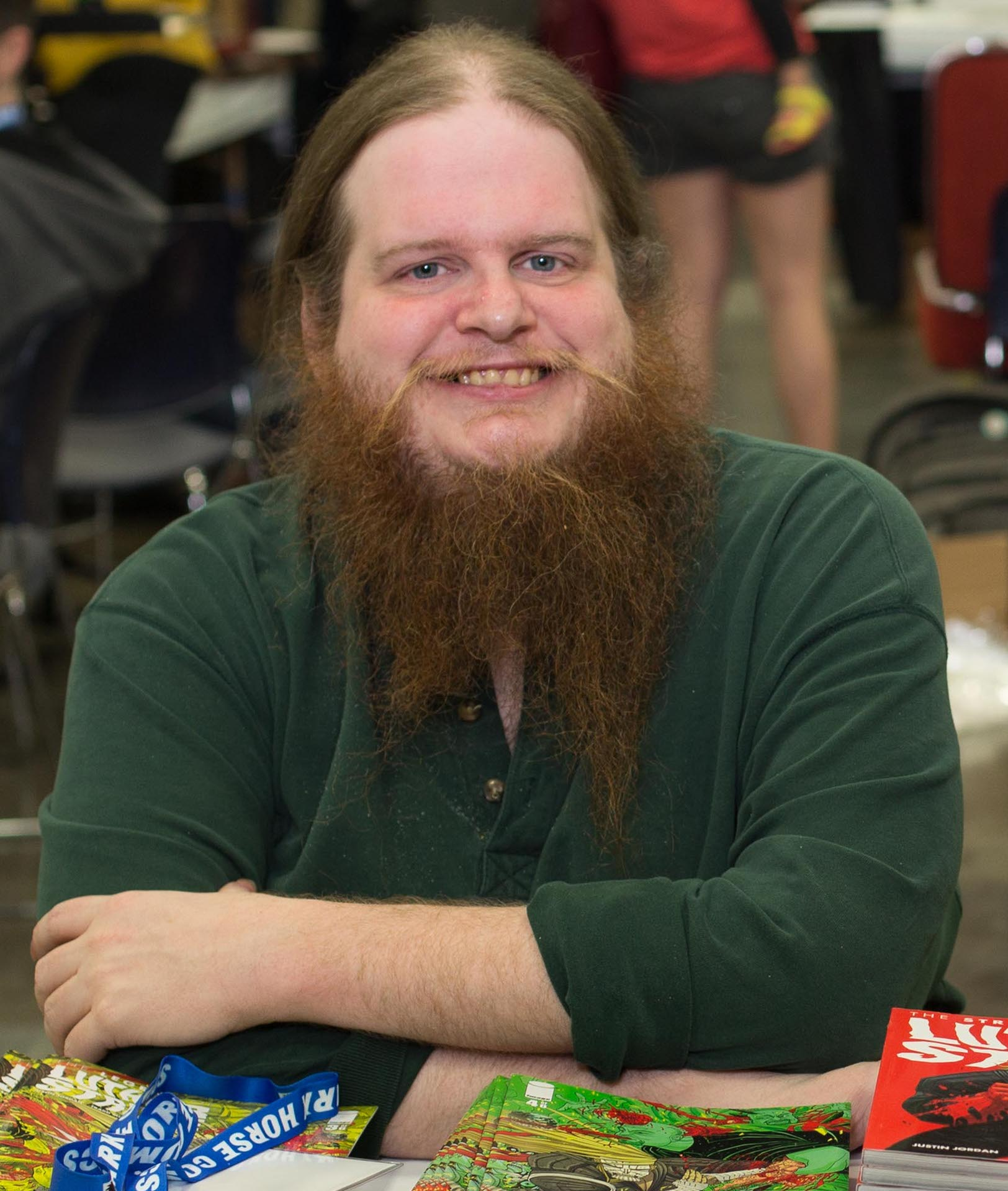
- Justin Jordan at Stumptown Comics Fest 2013
- Born: 1978 (age 47–48)
- Occupation: Comics writer
- Writing career
- Genres: Superhero, horror, science fiction
- Notable works: The Strange Talent of Luther Strode; Green Lantern: New Guardians

Justin Jordan (born 1978) is an American comics writer. He is known for co-creating (with artist Tradd Moore) The Strange Talent of Luther Strode and its two sequels (published by Image Comics), and for writing 22 issues of Green Lantern: New Guardians (DC Comics).

== Biography ==
Jordan's other work includes writing 6- to 9-issue "New 52" runs on Superboy, Deathstroke, and Team 7 (DC); relaunching and writing 10 issues of Shadowman (Valiant Comics); and co-creating series such as Deep State (Boom! Studios), Spread (Image), Dead Body Road (Image), Dark Gods (Avatar Press), and Savage Things (Vertigo), Breaklands (ComiXology), and Reaver (Image).

In 2012, he was nominated for the Harvey Award for Most Promising New Talent. He is one of the writers of the Eisner-nominated In the Dark: A Horror Anthology (IDW).

Jordan, Dan DiDio, and Kenneth Rocafort launched the Sideways series in 2018 as part of DC's "Dark Matter" line.

== Bibliography ==
=== AfterShock Comics ===
- Backways #1-5 (2017-2018)
- Strayer #1-5 (2016)

=== Avatar Press ===
- Crossed Special 2014 (2014)
- Crossed: Badlands #57-61 (2014)
- Dark Gods #1-6 (2014-2015)
- God is Dead: The Book of Acts Omega (2014)

=== BOOM! Studios ===
- Adventure Time Comics #14 (2017)
- Deep State #1-8 (2014-2015)
- Harrower #1-4 (2023)
- John Flood #1-6 (2015-2016)
- Planet of the Apes / Green Lantern #1-6 (2017)
- Sombra #1-4 (2016)

=== Comixology ===
- Breaklands #1-5 (2019-2020)
- Breaklands Season Two #1-5 (2020-2021)
- Breaklands Season Three #1-5 (2023)

=== Dark Horse Comics ===
- The Beast of Boriken #1 (2026-)
- Call of Duty: Zombies #1-6 (2016-2017)
- Call of Duty: Zombies 2 #1-4 (2018-2019)
- Eerie Comics #8 (2015)

=== DC Comics ===
- Adventures of Superman vol 2. #1 (2013)
- The Curse of Brimstone #1-12, Annual 1 (2018-2019)
- Dark Knights: Death Metal - The Last 52: War of the Multiverses #1 (2020)
- Deathstroke vol 2. #15-20 (2012-2013)
- Green Lantern/New Gods: Godhead #1 (2014)
- Green Lantern: New Guardians #21-40, Annual 2 (2013-2015)
- Green Lantern: New Guardians - Futures End #1 (2014)
- The Ruff and Reddy Show #5 (2018)
- Savage Things #1-8 (2017)
- Sideways #1-5 (2018)
- Superboy vol 5. #20-25 (2013)
- Supergirl vol 6. #25 (2013)
- Team 7 vol 2. #0-8 (2012-2013)
- Trinity vol 2. #17 (2018)

=== Dynamite ===
- Evil Ernie: Godeater #1-5 (2016-2017)

=== Image Comics ===
- Dead Body Road #1-6 (2013-2014)
- Dead Body Road: Bad Blood #1-6 (2020)
- Death of Love #1-5 (2018)
- The Family Trade #1-5 (2017-2018)
- Hack/Slash #16-17 (2012)
- The Legacy of Luthor Strode #1-6 (2015-2016)
- The Legend of Luthor Strode #1-6 (2012-2013)
- Malevolent #1- (2026-)
- Reaver #1-11 (2019-2020)
- Skullkickers #18 (2012)
- Spread #1-25 (2014-2018)
- The Strange Talent of Luthor Strode #1-6 (2011-2012)
- Summoners War: Awakening #1-6 (2023)
- Summoners War: Legacy #1-6 (2021)

=== Heavy Metal ===
- Heavy Metal vol 36. #295, 297, 300 (2019, 2020)
- Heavy Metal vol 37. #2 (2025)

=== Mad Cave Comics ===
- Gunpowder Prophets #1-5 (2025-2026)

=== Marvel Comics ===
- A+X #12 (2013)
- Monsters Unleashed #9-12 (2017-2018)

=== Oni Press ===
- Mine is a Long, Lonesome Grave #1-4 (2025)
- Xino #3 (2023)

=== Valiant ===
- Archer & Armstrong vol 2. #25 (2014)
- Bloodshot vol 2. #25 (2014)
- Harbinger vol 2. #25 (2014)
- Shadowman vol 2. #0-10 (2012-2013)
- Unity #25 vol 2. #25 (2015)
- X-O Manowar vol 2. #25 (2014)

Preceded by Dan Abnett; Andy Lanning	Shadowman writer 2012–2013	Succeeded by Peter Milligan
Preceded by Rob Liefeld	Deathstroke writer 2013	Succeeded by Tony Daniel
Preceded by Tom DeFalco	Superboy writer 2013–2014	Succeeded by Marv Wolfman
Preceded by Tony Bedard	Green Lantern: New Guardians writer 2013–2015	Succeeded by n/a
