= Robert Meyers =

Robert Meyers may refer to:

- Robert Meyers (politician) (1914–2007), American politician and judge
- Robert Meyers (ice hockey) (1924–2014), Canadian ice hockey player
- Bob Meyers (journalist), past president of the National Press Foundation

== See also ==
- Robert Meyer (disambiguation)
- Robert Myers (disambiguation)
