= Elliot Hirshman =

American psychologist and academic (born 1961)

Elliot Lee Hirshman (born February 21, 1961) is an American psychologist and academic who is the president of Stevenson University in Owings Mills, Maryland, since July 3, 2017. Prior to Stevenson University he served as president at San Diego State University (SDSU) and served as the provost and senior vice president of the University of Maryland, Baltimore County.

== Early life and education ==
Hirshman was born in 1961 and grew up in a Jewish family in New Brunswick, New Jersey. His father was Harold Hirshman and his mother was Edna May Hirshman.

Hirshman earned a bachelor's degree in economics and mathematics from Yale University in 1983. He received a master's degree (1984) and a PhD in cognitive psychology (1987) from UCLA. While at UCLA he was a member of the Bjork Learning and Forgetting Lab and Cogfog. He then took a two-year post-doctoral fellowship at New York University.

== Career ==
He taught in the psychology department at the University of North Carolina at Chapel Hill from 1989 to 2000. He chaired the psychology departments at the University of Colorado at Denver (2000–2002) and at George Washington University (2002–2005), where he later served as chief research officer (2005–2008). From 2008 to 2011 he was provost and senior vice president for academic affairs at the University of Maryland, Baltimore County. He became the eighth president of SDSU in 2011. SDSU, founded in 1897, is a part of the California State University system; it has 36,000 students and a faculty and staff of 7,000. It offers undergraduate, master's and doctoral degrees through eight academic colleges and is an NCAA Division One school offering 19 sports. During his tenure he is credited with greatly improving the university's reputation and rankings, fundraising, and graduation rates. In March 2017 he announced his intention to resign from SDSU, effective June 2017, to become president of Stevenson University in Maryland.

== Personal ==
He is married to Jeri Hirshman; they have a son and a daughter.
