= Fatality (character) =

Character in DC Comic universe

- Fatality as depicted in Green Lantern Secret Files and Origins #1 (July 1998). Art by Darryl Banks and Romeo Tanghal.

Publication information
- Publisher: DC Comics
- First appearance: Green Lantern (vol. 3) #83 (February 1997)
- Created by: Ron Marz; Darryl Banks

In-story information
- Alter ego: Yrra Cynril
- Species: Xanshian
- Team affiliations: Indigo Tribe; New Guardians; Star Sapphires; Secret Society of Super Villains; Injustice League; Sinestro Corps
- Notable aliases: Proselyte
- Abilities: Skilled martial artist and weapons master. Formerly: Sinestro corpsmen Wears a yellow power ring Star Sapphire corpsmen Wears a violet power ring

Fatality (Yrra Cynril) is a supervillain in the DC Comics universe. She was created by Ron Marz and first appeared in Green Lantern (vol. 3) #83 in February 1997.

== Publication history ==
After debuting in a three-part storyline in Green Lantern (vol. 3) #83-85 (February–April 1997), the character returned for many additional appearances. She joined the title team in Green Lantern: New Guardians #1 (September 2011).

== Fictional character biography ==
The eldest child of the planet Xanshi's ruling family, Yrra Cynril was sent off-world to be educated by the Warlords of Okaara. Xanshi is destroyed due to a miscalculation by Green Lantern John Stewart, making Yrra her world's sole survivor. Learning of Xanshi's fate, she leaves Okaara and dedicates herself to becoming the deadliest warrior in the entire universe. Remaining ignorant of Stewart's identity, she swears vengeance on all Green Lanterns. When the Green Lantern Corps is rendered powerless, Fatality views the last Green Lantern, Kyle Rayner, as her ultimate prize. Their conflict takes them from Earth to a desolate planetoid, where during combat she discovers Stewart was to blame for Xanshi's destruction. Fatality seemingly perishes in the battle, though no body (save a severed arm) is recovered. Fatality later appears on Earth, having acquired a prosthetic arm and a yellow power ring from Qward. She again fights Kyle Rayner, who convinces her to remove the yellow ring. However, the ring explodes and teleports away after being removed, destroying Fatality's remaining arm.

Fatality later became a member of the Earth-based Secret Society of Super Villains. She is employed as a guard at a torture facility for superhumans under the directorship of the Crime Doctor. While in battle, she loses an ear to Vandal Savage's daughter, Scandal, one of the doctor's escaping victims.

Fatality as Star Sapphire

Fatality appears as a member of the new Injustice League, with a new Sinestro Corps yellow power ring. Later, she is captured by the Zamarons and experimented upon, and became the Star Sapphire of Sector 1313. Influenced by the violet light of love, she is now set on forgiving her nemesis, John Stewart, for whom she claims to have romantic feelings. She finds Stewart on Okaara fighting Larfleeze and encourages him to forgive himself, having overcome her survivor guilt.

Fatality represents the Star Sapphires in the title Green Lantern: New Guardians, serving as a provisional member of a makeshift 'team' consisting of one representative from each of the seven Corps. Having learned of Larfleeze's role in banishing the Archangel Invictus into another dimension, Fatality returns to Zamaron to recharge, where the Zamarons tell her that someone in this universe must have created the opportunity for Invictus to return.

When Fatality learns the Reach has invaded the Blue Lantern homeworld, she immediately rushes to aid the Blue Lanterns. She then helps the fragments of Mogo bring themselves back to life after Stewart was forced to destroy Mogo during Krona's temporary takeover of the Corps. Following the villainous First Lantern being destroyed and the unemotional Guardians killed off by Sinestro, Fatality begins a relationship with Stewart.

After the Durlan invasion, it is revealed that a Durlan secretly impersonated Fatality throughout the last few months. After permanently gaining the powers of a Daxamite, the Durlan destroys her Star Sapphire ring. John Stewart defeats the imposter and searches for the real Fatality. When Stewart locates and reunites with her, Fatality attacks him, furious at her transformation into a Star Sapphire and Stewart not noticing that she had been replaced. After Stewart refuses to fight, Fatality leaves, telling Stewart that he and the Star Sapphires are her enemies.

== Powers and abilities ==
Fatality possesses superhuman physical abilities and is an expert in various forms of combat and the use of many weapons. Additionally, she has wielded yellow and violet power rings at various points in time.

== Other versions ==
In a possible future, the Book of Oa shows that Yrra would one day marry John Stewart.

== In other media ==
- A six-inch toy of Fatality as Star Sapphire was included as part of a four-pack in the "Blackest Night" toyline in 2010.
- Fatality appears in DC Universe Online.
