= Tradd Moore =

Comic book artist

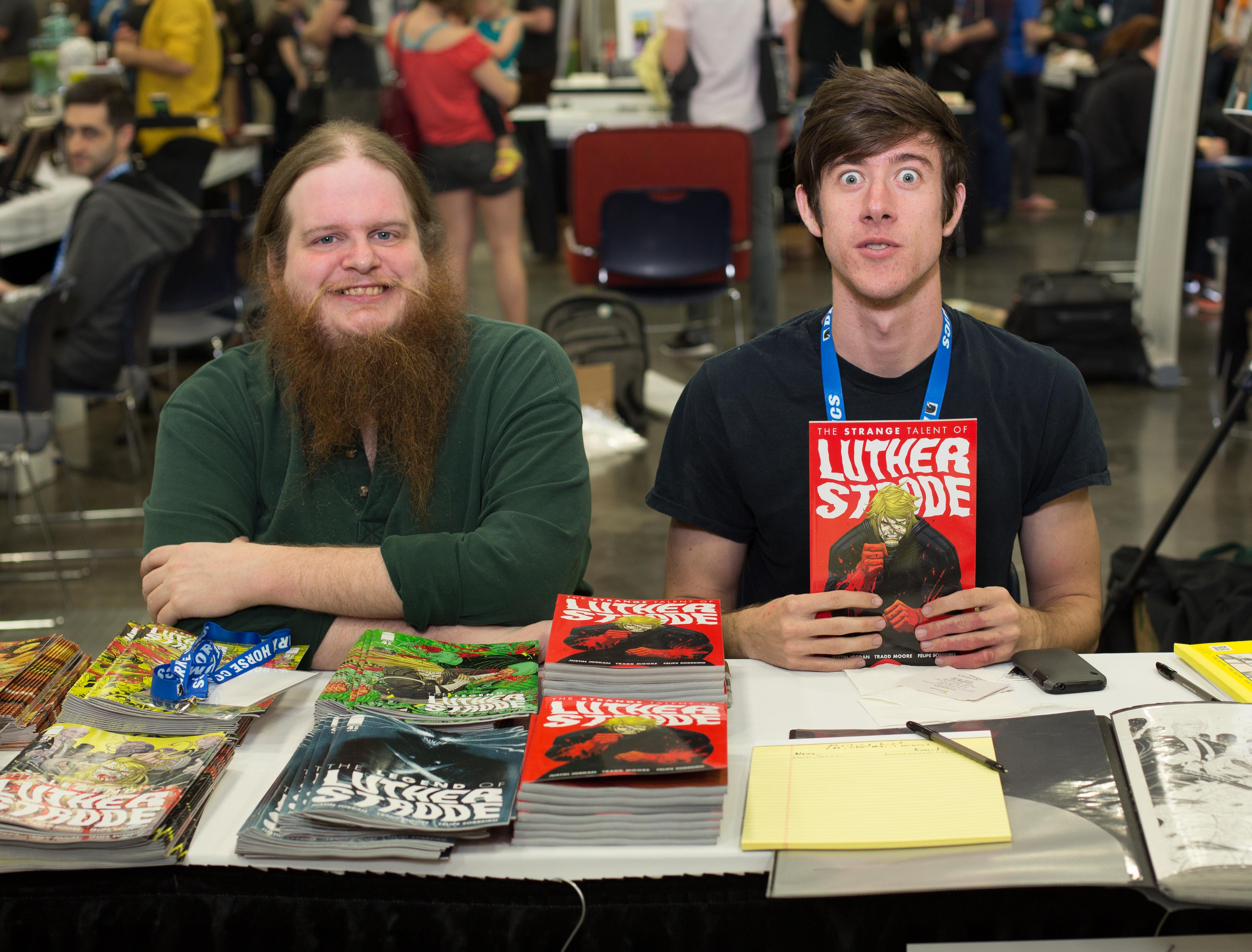
- Moore (right) with writer Justin Jordan at Stumptown Comics Festival 2013
- Born: October 31, 1987 (age 39) Snellville, Georgia
- Areas: Cartoonist, Writer, Penciller, Inker
- Notable works: Silver Surfer: Black; Doctor Strange: Fall Sunrise; Luther Strode; All-New Ghost Rider; The New World
- Awards: Lucca Comics & Games Award for Best Artist (2024)

Tradd Moore (born October 31, 1987) is an American comic book artist. His work has appeared in series published by Marvel Comics, Image Comics and DC Comics.

== Comics career ==
Moore graduated from Savannah College of Art and Design in 2010. While still in college he was discovered on DeviantArt by writer Justin Jordan, who pitched him the script for a new comic. Their first collaboration, the six-issue action-horror series The Strange Talent of Luther Strode, was published in 2011 by Image Comics. A sequel, The Legend of Luther Strode was released the following year.

Moore was then noticed by DC Comics, who asked him to illustrate an issue of the Batman anthology Legends of the Dark Knight. In 2013 he also started working for Marvel Comics, drawing several covers for Deadpool. The same year he drew the second issue of writer Aleš Kot's espionage thriller Zero for Image Comics. In 2014 Moore drew the first five issues of All-New Ghost Rider for Marvel's All-New, All-Different relaunch. He also contributed covers for Kot's whole run on Secret Avengers.

The following year he reunited with writer Justin Jordan for the last installment in the Luther Strode trilogy, The Legacy of Luther Strode. He also returned to Ghost Rider with a backup story in the first issue of the relaunch, and to Deadpool, creating the covers for the Deadpool vs. Thanos mini series.

In 2017 he illustrated the landmark issue #150 of Venom, and continued to contribute covers for Marvel's Secret Warriors and IDW's Revolutionaries.

Moore returned to Image comics in 2018, co-plotting, penciling and inking the five-issue sci-fi action romance series The New World with writer Aleš Kot.

In 2019 Moore collaborated with fellow Savannah College of Art alumnus Donny Cates on the five-issue series Silver Surfer: Black. It was released to critical acclaim.

In early 2020 it was revealed that The New World would be adapted into a movie by Warner Bros., with Jeremy O. Harris on screenwriting duties. Later that year he wrote and illustrated a short story for the milestone issue #850 of The Amazing Spider-Man. At 2022 San Diego Comic-Con it was announced that Moore's next project will be Doctor Strange: Fall Sunrise, a four-issue miniseries that he will be both writing and illustrating.

In June 2024, the Islay whisky distillery Ardbeg released a new whisky in collaboration with Tradd Moore.

In July 2026, it was announced that Moore would be writing/drawing his first ever creator-owned comic, Touch Me Someplace Nowhere. The series, published by Oni Press, will be released in 2027.

== Bibliography ==
=== Interior work ===
==== DC Comics ====
- Legends of the Dark Knight #8 (art, with writers Paul Tobin and Ricardo Sanchez, 2013)
- Batman Black and White #1 (art, with writer James Tynion IV, 2020)

==== Image Comics ====
- The Strange Talent of Luther Strode #1–6 (art, with writer Justin Jordan, 2011–12)
- The Legend of Luther Strode #1–6 (art, with writer Justin Jordan, 2012–13)
- Zero #2 (art, with writer Aleš Kot, 2013)
- The Legacy of Luther Strode #1–6 (art, with writer Justin Jordan, 2015–16)
- The New World #1–5 (art, with writer Aleš Kot, 2018)

==== Marvel Comics ====
- All-New Ghost Rider #1–5 (art, with writer Felipe Smith, 2014)
- Ghost Rider #1 (backup story art with writer Felipe Smith, 2016)
- Venom #150 (art, among other artists with writer Mike Costa, 2017)
- Silver Surfer: Black #1–5 (art and story, with writer Donny Cates, 2019)
- Guardians of the Galaxy #12 (art, among other artists with writer Donny Cates, 2019)
- The Amazing Spider-Man #850 (art and story, among other writers and artists, 2020)
- Doctor Strange: Fall Sunrise #1–4 (art and story, 2022–23)
