= Robert Meyer (disambiguation) =

Robert Meyer (born 1945) is a Norwegian art photographer, professor, photo historian, collector, writer and publicist.

Robert Meyer may also refer to:

- August Meyer (August Robert Meyer, 1851–1905), American engineer
- Robert René Meyer-Sée (1884 – after 1947), French art dealer and critic
- Jack Meyer (John Robert Meyer, 1932–1967), American baseball player
- Bob Meyer (logician) (1932–2009), Australian professor
- Bob Meyer (born 1939), American baseball player
- Bobby Meyer, American soccer player
- Robert Meyer, American engineer and husband of pilot Marta Bohn-Meyer (1957–2005)
- Robert Meyer (pathologist) (1864–1947), German pathologist
- Robert J. Meyer (1935–1984), American politician in the New Jersey General Assembly
- Robert B. Meyer (1943–2023), American physicist
- Robert L. Meyer (1923–1972), American attorney

== See also ==
- Robert Meyer Burnett (born 1967), American film producer
- Robert Meier (1897–2007), formerly Germany's oldest living man
- Bob Maier (1915–1993), American baseball player
- Robert Meyers (disambiguation)
- Robert Myers (disambiguation)
- Robert H. Meyer Memorial State Beach, state beach of California
