= The Strange Talent of Luther Strode =

American comic book

- The Strange Talent of Luther Strode Issue #6

Publication information
- Publisher: Image Comics
- Schedule: Monthly
- Format: Complete
- Genre: Action, horror
- Publication date: October, 2011 - March, 2012
- No. of issues: 6
- Main character: Luther Strode

Creative team
- Created by: Justin Jordan; Tradd Moore; Felipe Sobreiro
- Written by: Justin Jordan
- Penciller: Tradd Moore
- Inker: Tradd Moore
- Colorist: Felipe Sobreiro

The Strange Talent of Luther Strode is an American comic book published by Image Comics written by Justin Jordan and with art by Tradd Moore and colors by Felipe Sobreiro. It debuted in October 2011. It features historical, horror, pop culture, and Judeo-Christian references weaved through the narrative.

== Premise ==
Luther Strode, a skinny teenager living alone with his mother, acquires enhanced physical abilities from Charles Atlas analog The Hercules Method. The creators intended the story as a slasher movie combined with the premise of Spider-Man—in layman's terms, "What if Peter Parker didn't have the moral anchor of his Uncle Ben to guide him?"

== Plot ==
Luther comes home with his best friend Pete to find his mail order exercise manual for the Hercules Method has come in. He starts planning to use it immediately after Pete has left for the day. Luther trains by himself that night, but to his disappointment there are no visible results. A man bound from head to toe in a mysterious location is confronted by a bald man, identified as the Librarian; he approaches and tells the bound man they've found a candidate. Luther, meanwhile, has gained inhuman reflexes and speed, as seen when he catches a falling dish. At school, Pete pushes Luther into Petra, a girl who he's been pining for. Later at P.E. Pete is hit during a game of dodge ball; a bully, named Paul, takes a cheap throw at Luther, who isn't seemingly paying attention. Luther's reflexes kick in and he catches it and throws it back with enough force that it's later revealed he broke Paul's nose. Aboard a ship in an unknown location a single crewman is hunted and seemingly killed by the Librarian. Back at school, Pete and Luther are cornered by Paul and his friends in the bathroom; Luther, at first, takes the beating from Paul until the latter mentions Petra. Luther responds with a single punch that shatters Paul's jaw and disgusts everyone else.

A few weeks later, Luther returns to school after being suspended for the punch. Paul again tries to pick a fight. Uncharacteristically, as he stops Paul from going after Pete, Luther starts having visions of him starting a school massacre with just his bare hands. After relaxing and letting Paul go on his way, he begins to notice he is starting to see people as their musculature, but it appears to stop. Petra approaches, and after some talk that makes Pete leave her alone with Luther, Petra admits she mutually has feelings for Luther. Later that night, Paul is attacked and killed by the Librarian, who has already slaughtered his parents. Luther is training when Petra comes into his room, catching him in just his underwear. An unknown amount of time later, Luther recounts the night with Petra to Pete as they go to a liquor store, which gets held up. Luther uses his abilities to stop the robbery and Pete declares him a superhero.

A few nights later, Pete gives Luther a makeshift costume consisting of all black clothing and a homemade mask. After debating about the costume and his powers with Pete, it's revealed that Luther's father abused his mother and he felt helpless to stop it. After trying to slip out of the house and being caught by his mother, he tells her he'll protect her if his father does find them. He goes on patrol in costume, but finds nothing until he discovers a man pulling a woman with him forcefully after leaving a club; he tries to intervene but the woman defends the man before Luther can do much. Luther decides to visit Petra but, after a brief talk, her father catches her and he has to leave. It's shown later that the robbers that Luther stopped are killed by the Librarian. When Pete talks to Luther about it they're interrupted by Petra, who's been physically abused but is hiding and being evasive about it. Luther, in his frustration, visits the guy who was defended by the woman the previous night and beats him half to death. After throwing the beaten man across the room, the Librarian enters and tells Luther to finish it.

Luther believes it's finished, but the Librarian attacks saying he's wrong and telling Luther how he's been cleaning up behind him. Luther loses the brawl and is knocked out, when he awakens, he finds his father being offered to him by the Librarian. It is only when Luther asks why he was chosen that it's revealed the story starts with Biblical Cain, who passed down his teachings of unlocking power through the years in the form of a manual from which only some can unlock the potential; one such person is revealed to be the serial killer Jack the Ripper. It's revealed that Luther's father had the potential but he wasted it. Luther refuses to kill his father and the Librarian kills the elder Strode. After Luther recovers, the Librarian tells him that he sent the friends of the man Luther had beaten to attack someone he cares for. Believing that person to be his mother, Luther runs back home to save her, only to find her safe and talking with Pete. It's only then when it occurs that it was Petra the Librarian was talking about.

Luther goes after Petra's father for information on where they took her and beats him bloody. Pete however is stuck explaining everything to Mrs. Strode; the Librarian comes and kidnaps Mrs. Strode leaving Pete for dead after pinning him to a cabinet with knives. At the same time, Luther mounts a rescue for Petra, but gets shot by the kidnappers. Fortunately, Luther manages to survive thanks to his newly acquired power, making him impervious to small arms fire. Luther then proceeds to slaughter the kidnappers in front of Petra, the shock of which causes her to pass out. When she wakes up she finds she's in Luther's home where Pete's barely alive as Luther deduces the truth. Pete dies and Luther goes after the Librarian while telling Petra to warn the police. The Librarian is holed up in an old wooden fishery as he explains his work of spreading the "Hercules Method" to Luther's mother, revealing that Luther is the first in decades to be gifted enough. Then the Librarian pulls Luther out of a hiding place, which begins their final fight; however it's interrupted as Luther accidentally kills his own mother as the Librarian dodges in a way that puts her in the path of Luther's attack. After lamenting his loss, Luther continues fighting, even after being disemboweled. Their fighting destroys the fishery revealing the cops have arrived with Petra as the building comes down. At first, the Librarian appears victorious, but then Luther suddenly appears to rip his spine and head out of his back. Luther, seeing no way out of this, charges at the police and they gun him down. However, after being placed in the morgue, Luther punches his way out of the body bags before cutting away to the man who is bound giving a chuckle.

== Sequels ==
=== The Legend of Luther Strode (2012-2013) ===
The story begins 5 years after the events of first comic book, featuring Luther taking on the forces behind the Librarian's attack. It ran for 6 issues.

=== The Legacy of Luther Strode (2015-2016) ===
The last chapter in the trilogy, with Luther now taking the fight to the source responsible for putting him on the path, ran for 6 issues.

== Film adaptation ==
On October 29, 2020, The Hollywood Reporter broke the news that the production studio Allnighter, with the blessing of Justin Jordan, optioned a film adaptation of Luther Strode.
