= Helen Rose Dawson =

American professor (1927–2022)

- fair use image
- Born: December 16, 1927; Washington, D.C.
- Died: July 14, 2022 (aged 94); Madison, Connecticut
- Occupations: Religious sister, college professor, college administrator

Helen Rose Dawson (December 16, 1927 – July 14, 2022) was an American religious sister, college professor and college dean. From 1965 to 1999, she was academic dean and vice president of Villa Julie College, now Stevenson University.

== Early life ==
Dawson was born in Washington, D.C., and raised on a farm in Rockville, Maryland, one of the five daughters of Lawrence Dawson and Helen Jenkins Dawson. She attended St. Martin's Parochial School in Gaithersburg, and graduated from Notre Dame High School in Media, Pennsylvania in 1945. While she was a religious sister, she earned a bachelor's degree from Trinity Washington University, a master's degree from Fordham University and a doctorate in education from Nova Southeastern University in Florida.

== Career ==
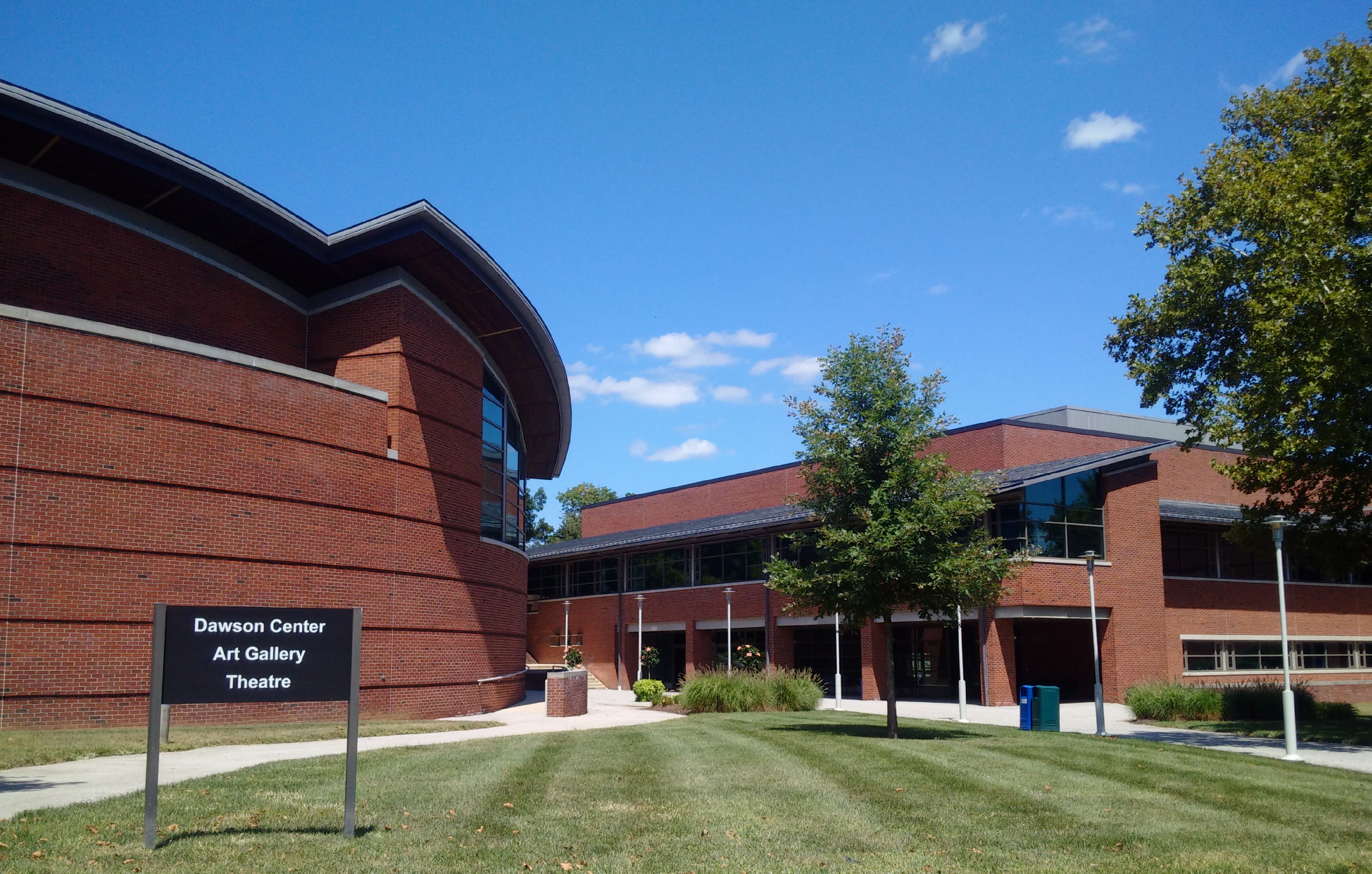
The Dawson Center at Stevenson University, named for Rose Dawson in 2008

From 1945 to 1980, Dawson was a Sister of Notre Dame de Namur. She taught in Roman Catholic schools. She was founding principal of Holy Rosary School when it opened on Staten Island in 1955. From 1960 to 1965, she was on the faculty at Trinity Washington University.

In 1965, Dawson became academic dean at Villa Julie College, a small Catholic junior college in Maryland. She worked with the college's president, lawyer Carolyn Manuszak, from 1965 until both retired in 1999. During their tenure, the college grew significantly in both enrollment and campus size, becoming a four-year college with a master's degree program; it also became co-educational, and separated from the Roman Catholic Church. Dawson promoted programs that kept Villa Julie students current on technological advances through the 1980s and 1990s. The college was renamed Stevenson University in 2008.

Dawson held several state-wide posts, including work with the Maryland State Advisory Council for Vocational-Technical Education, the Maryland Association of Community and Junior Colleges, and the Middle Atlantic States Evaluation Committee. She was on the advisory board of the Union Memorial Hospital Nursing School, and Maryvale Preparatory School. On the occasion of her 25th year at Villa Julie, congresswoman Helen Delich Bentley honored in remarks on the floor of the House of Representatives, saying that Dawson "must be regarded as nothing short of a national treasure".

== Personal life ==
In 2022, Dawson died after a stroke at her home in Madison, Connecticut, at the age of 94. The Rose Dawson Center on the campus of Stevenson University is named in her memory, as are the school's Rose Dawson Excellence in Teaching Awards.
