= Ales Kot =

Czech-American comic book writer

Aleš Kot
- Born: September 27, 1986 (age 40)
- Area: Writer
- Notable works: Zero; Secret Avengers; Bucky Barnes: The Winter Soldier; Bloodborne; Devlin Waugh

Ales (Aleš) Kot (born September 27, 1986) is a Czech-American comic book writer known for their psychedelic spy series Zero published by Image and their work for Marvel, as well as brief controversy involving fellow comics writer Nathan Edmondson.

== Bibliography ==
=== Image Comics ===
- Wild Children (with Riley Rossmo, graphic novel, 64 pages, 2012, ISBN 1-60706-581-9)
- Change #1–4 (with Morgan Jeske, 2012–2013) collected as Change (tpb, 128 pages, 2013, ISBN 1-60706-682-3)
- Zero (with Michael Walsh (#1), Tradd Moore (#2), Mateus Santolouco (#3), Morgan Jeske (#4), Will Tempest (#5), Vanesa del Rey (#6), Matt Taylor (#7), Jorge Coelho (#8), Tonči Zonjić (#9), Michael Gaydos (#10), Ricardo López Ortiz (#11), Adam Gorham (#12), Alberto Ponticelli (#13), Marek Oleksicki (#14), Ian Bertram (#15), Stathis Tsemberlidis (#16), Robert Sammelin (#17) and Tula Lotay (#18), 2013–2015) collected as:
  - An Emergency (collects #1–5, tpb, 172 pages, 2014, ISBN 1-60706-863-X)
  - At the Heart of It All (collects #6–10, tpb, 160 pages, 2014, ISBN 1-63215-105-7)
  - Tenderness of Wolves (collects #11–14, tpb, 128 pages, 2015, ISBN 1-63215-252-5)
  - Who by Fire (collects #15–18, tpb, 128 pages, 2015, ISBN 1-63215-345-9)
- Quiet (with Morgan Jeske, unproduced graphic novel — announced in 2013)
- The Darkness (one-shots, Top Cow):
  - The Darkness: Vicious Traditions (with Dean Ormston, 2014)
  - The Darkness: Close Your Eyes (with Marek Oleksicki, 2014)
- Thought Bubble Anthology #4: "A Letter to the Sixteen-Year-Old" (with Alison Sampson, 2014) collected in Thought Bubble Anthology Collection (tpb, 136 pages, 2016, ISBN 1-5343-0067-8)
- The Surface #1–4 (with Langdon Foss, 2015) collected as The Surface (tpb, 128 pages, 2015, ISBN 1-63215-322-X)
- Material #1–4 (with Will Tempest, 2015) collected as Material (tpb, 128 pages, 2015, ISBN 1-63215-474-9)
- Wolf (with Matt Taylor and Ricardo López Ortiz, 2015–2016) collected as:
  - Blood and Magic (collects #1–4, tpb, 144 pages, 2015, ISBN 1-63215-502-8)
  - Apocalypse Soon (collects #5–9, tpb, 128 pages, 2016, ISBN 1-63215-715-2)
- Antistar (with Christian Ward, unreleased graphic novel — announced in 2013, solicited for 2016; 64 pages, ISBN 1-63215-110-3)
- Generation Gone #1–5 (with André Lima Araújo, 2017) collected as Generation Gone (tpb, 176 pages, 2018, ISBN 1-5343-0470-3)
- The New World #1–5 (with Tradd Moore, 2018) collected as The New World (tpb, 176 pages, 2019, ISBN 1-5343-0872-5)
- Days of Hate (with Danijel Žeželj, 2018–2019) collected as:
  - Act One (collects #1–6, tpb, 176 pages, 2018, ISBN 1-5343-0697-8)
  - Act Two (collects #7–12, tpb, 168 pages, 2019, ISBN 1-5343-1045-2)
- Lost Soldiers #1–5 (with Luca Casalanguida, 2020) collected as Lost Soldiers (tpb, 168 pages, 2021, ISBN 1-5343-1820-8)
- Gunslinger Spawn #1: "A Small Gift" (with Kevin Keane, co-feature, Todd McFarlane Productions, 2021) collected in Spawn's Universe Collection (tpb, 144 pages, 2022, ISBN 1-5343-2429-1)

=== Marvel Comics ===
- Secret Avengers (with Butch Guice, Luke Ross (vol. 2 #15–16) and Michael Walsh; issues #12–16 of the second volume are co-written by Kot and Nick Spencer, 2014–2015) collected as:
  - How to MA.I.M. a Mockingbird (collects vol. 2 #12–16, tpb, 112 pages, 2014, ISBN 0-7851-8482-1)
  - Let's Have a Problem (collects vol. 3 #1–5, tpb, 144 pages, 2014, ISBN 0-7851-9052-X)
    - Includes the digital-only 2-issue limited series Original Sin: Secret Avengers (written by Kot, art by Ryan Kelly, 2014)
  - The Labyrinth (collects vol. 3 #6–10, tpb, 112 pages, 2015, ISBN 0-7851-9053-8)
  - God Level (collects vol. 3 #11–15, tpb, 112 pages, 2015, ISBN 0-7851-9710-9)
- Iron Patriot #1–5 (with Garry Brown, 2014) collected as Iron Patriot: Unbreakable (tpb, 120 pages, 2014, ISBN 0-7851-9028-7)
- Bucky Barnes: The Winter Soldier (with Marco Rudy, Michael Walsh (#3 and 11) and Langdon Foss, 2014–2015) collected as:
  - Volume 1: The Man on the Wall (collects #1–5, tpb, 112 pages, 2015, ISBN 0-7851-8929-7)
  - Volume 2 (collects #6–11, tpb, 136 pages, 2015, ISBN 0-7851-8930-0)

=== Other publishers ===
- DC Comics:
  - Suicide Squad vol. 4 #20–23 (with Patrick Zircher and Rick Leonardi (#23), 2013) collected in Suicide Squad: Discipline and Punish (tpb, 144 pages, 2014, ISBN 1-4012-4701-6)
  - The Witching Hour: "Little Witch" (with Morgan Jeske, anthology one-shot, Vertigo, 2013)
- Black Mask Studios:
  - Occupy Comics #1: "Citizen Journalist" (with Tyler Crook, anthology, 2013) collected in Occupy Comics (tpb, 160 pages, 2014, ISBN 1-62875-007-3)
  - Liberator: Rage Ignition: "Misericordia" (with Morgan Jeske — story created for the collected edition; tpb, 144 pages, 2014, ISBN 1-62875-008-1)
- TOME Volume 1 (interview with Riley Rossmo conducted by Kot, anthology graphic novel, 200 pages, IDW Publishing, 2013, ISBN 1-63140-459-8)
- Valiant:
  - Shadowman vol. 4 #12: "Deadside Blues" (with CAFU, co-feature, 2013) collected in Shadowman: Deadside Blues (tpb, 112 pages, 2014, ISBN 1-939346-16-9)
  - Dead Drop #1–4 (with Adam Gorham, 2015) collected as Dead Drop (tpb, 112 pages, 2015, ISBN 1-939346-85-1)
- Eerie vol. 2 #4: "Ickstarter" (with Sloane Leong, anthology, Dark Horse, 2013) collected in Eerie: Experiments in Terror (tpb, 168 pages, 2016, ISBN 1-61655-880-6)
- Think of a City page 49 (with Langdon Foss, Internet art project, 2015)
- James Bond: The Body #1–6 (with Luca Casalanguida, Dynamite, 2018) collected as James Bond: The Body (hc, 152 pages, 2018, ISBN 1-5241-0756-5)
- Bloodborne (with Piotr Kowalski, Titan, 2018–2019) collected as:
  - The Death of Sleep (collects #1–4, tpb, 112 pages, 2018, ISBN 1-78586-344-4)
  - The Healing Thirst (collects #5–8, tpb, 112 pages, 2019, ISBN 1-78586-953-1)
  - A Song of Crows (collects #9–12, tpb, 112 pages, 2019, ISBN 1-78773-014-X)
  - The Veil, Torn Asunder (collects #13–16, tpb, 112 pages, 2020, ISBN 1-78773-015-8)
- Judge Dredd Megazine (anthology, Rebellion):
  - Devlin Waugh:
    - Devlin Waugh: Blood Debt (tpb, 176 pages, 2021, ISBN 1-78108-767-9) includes:
      - "Call Me by Thy Name" (with Mike Dowling, in #400, 2018)
      - "A Very Large Splash" (with Mike Dowling, in #415–420, 2020)
    - Devlin Waugh: The Reckoning (tpb, 160 pages, 2023, ISBN 1-78618-776-0) collects:
      - "The Wolves of Saint Vitus" (with Patrick Goddard, in #422, 2020)
      - "When I Was a Young Demon (I Did a Bad, Bad Thing)" (with Patrick Goddard, in #423, 2020)
      - "A Question of Trust" (with Mike Dowling, in #430, 2021)
      - "The Lord of Lies" (with Mike Dowling, in #431, 2021)
      - "The Reckoning" (with Mike Dowling, in #432–438, 2021)
    - "Karma Police" (with Rob Richardson, in #449–455, 2022–2023)
    - "Night Clubbing" (with Steven Austin, in #465–466, 2024)
    - "Home Away from Home" (with P. J. Holden, in #467, 2024)
    - "Two Months Off" (with P. J. Holden, in #449–455, 2024–2025)
- YT Savior (with Robert Sammelin, unreleased series intended for publication by AWA Studios, announced in 2019)

Preceded by Adam Glass	Suicide Squad writer 2013	Succeeded by Matt Kindt
Preceded by Nick Spencer	Secret Avengers writer 2014–2015	Succeeded by n/a
