= Tony Bedard =

American comics writer

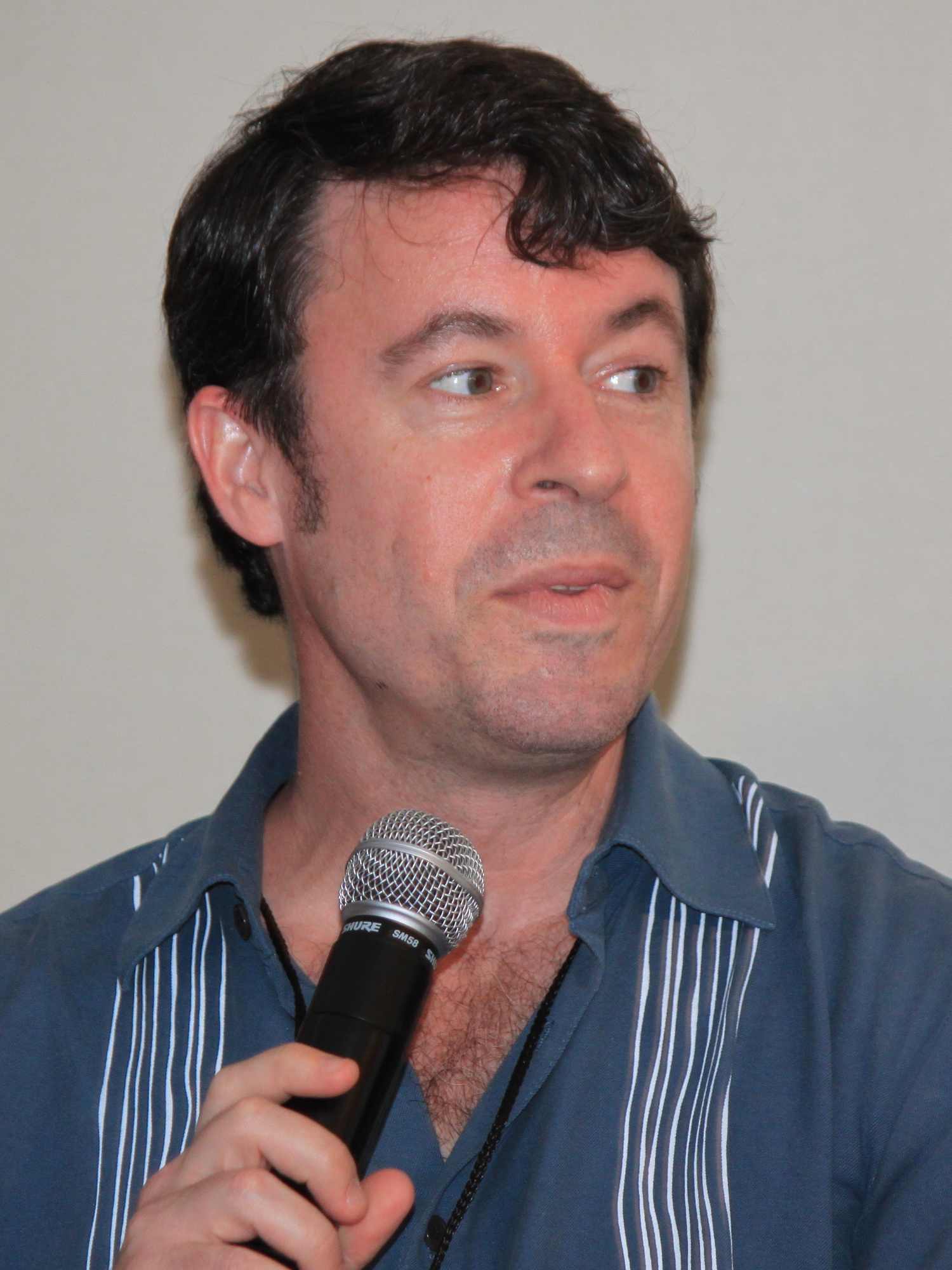
- Bedard at the Florida Supercon in 2012
- Born: Antony J. L. Bedard
- Areas: Writer, editor
- Notable works: Negation; Exiles; Call of Duty; Birds of Prey; Green Lantern: New Guardians; Supergirl; Turok: Son of Stone

Antony J. L. Bedard is an American writer and editor who has worked in the comic book industry since 1992, and in the video game industry since 2012. His best known video game works include several installments in the Call of Duty franchise, such as Black Ops 4, Black Ops Cold War, Vanguard, and Modern Warfare III. As a writer, he is known for the co-creation of Negation and his writing for Route 666 for CrossGen Comics, as well as his run on Marvel Comics X-Men spin-off Exiles, and multiple series for DC Comics including Birds of Prey, Green Lantern: New Guardians, Supergirl, and a trilogy of San Diego Comic-Con exclusive comics involving Colonel Sanders. He also wrote the screenplay to the 2008 animated feature Turok: Son of Stone.

== Background ==
When Bedard was in college, he was a member of the Alpha Gamma chapter of the Delta Sigma Phi Fraternity. While a member, he started writing comics about his friends in the fraternity, using "Tonan The Barbarian" as a nickname.

== Career ==
Tony began his work in the comics industry by working at Valiant Comics as an intern in 1992. There he worked his way up, first by lettering some of Valiant's comics and eventually becoming the editor and writer of several titles including Rai, Psi-Lords and Magnus Robot Fighter. His early work is credited by his full name: Antony J.L. Bedard. After Valiant, Tony moved to freelance work for Broadway, Malibu and Crusade Comics. With Crusade, he wrote the first two issues of Shi: The Series.

In 1997, Tony took an editorial position at DC Comics, where he worked on a number of projects, including JLA, Aquaman, Wonder Woman, and the Hourman monthly. He eventually moved into the Vertigo imprint, where he edited several monthly titles, including Transmetropolitan, Garth Ennis's War Stories, and Vertigo's longest-running title, Hellblazer.

In 2001 Bedard signed an exclusive contract with CrossGen Comics. Bedard provided editorial knowledge to the company and took over writing CrossGen's launch title Mystic. He went on to co-create Negation with Mark Waid and Paul Pelletier. He wrote a number of series for CrossGen, including the horror comic Route 666 and the spy spoof Kiss Kiss Bang Bang. Bedard was writing the crossover mini-series Negation War when CrossGen filed for bankruptcy; as a result, only two issues of the series were ever published, and Bedard became the last writer of the Sigilverse.

After CrossGen, Bedard began work on the Marvel Comics series Exiles, which he wrote for 44 issues and an annual. Originally announced as leaving Exiles with #83, his run was extended by six issues due to Chris Claremont being diagnosed with cardiac stress. Bedard also scripted Uncanny X-Men #472-473 and Annual #1, with plots from Claremont, and was the sole writer of Uncanny X-Men #474. Apart from Exiles he had a number of side projects, including the mini-series Spider-Man: Breakout and the final 6 issues of the Rogue monthly comic book.

Bedard then started writing for other comic publishers. With Image Comics, Bedard put out a mini-series he created called Retro Rocket, and he co-wrote three issues of DC Comics' Supergirl and the Legion of Super-Heroes, helping out his former CrossGen co-worker Mark Waid.

After wrapping up his run on Exiles, Tony returned to DC Comics and worked on a story in JSA: Classified. At the Wondercon Convention, Bedard announced that he had signed on to a two-year exclusive contract with DC Comics. His first announced projects included writing portions of the new weekly series Countdown, a six issue arc on Supergirl and the Legion of Super-Heroes, and a four issue Black Canary mini-series. Bedard then went on to write arcs on both Supergirl and Birds of Prey as well as contributing to The Outsiders fifth week event in August. He was the regular writer for Birds of Prey from #118 until the series' end with #127.

In 2007, Bedard wrote the screenplay for the animated feature Turok: Son of Stone, released in 2008. The film is notable for its inclusion of Native American and First Nations actors in its cast, such as Adam Beach, Irene Bedard, Adam Gifford, Graham Greene, Russell Means, Tatanka Means, and Cree Summer.

In 2009, Bedard moved on to a number of projects at DC, the first of those being an all-new monthly series called R.E.B.E.L.S. with artist Andy Clarke, which began in February. In 2010, Bedard became the ongoing writer for Green Lantern Corps starting with issue 48, coinciding with the beginning of the "Brightest Day" crossover event, and in 2011 he launched the bi-weekly DC Universe Online: Legends series, co-written with Marv Wolfman and Tom Taylor.

As part of DC's 2011 New 52 initiative, Bedard became the ongoing writer for Green Lantern: New Guardians and Blue Beetle. Blue Beetle lasted for 16 issues and a Zero Issue, and was cancelled in January 2013. Bedard left Green Lantern: New Guardians when all of the Green Lantern books changed creative teams with the departure of Geoff Johns from the main title in May 2013. When DC relaunched the Sword of Sorcery fantasy anthology title in 2012, Bedard wrote the first backup story, featuring Beowulf. In December 2013, Bedard returned to Supergirl as the ongoing writer from issue 26.

In 2012, Bedard became a writer at Volition Games, contributing to Saints Row IV and Agents of Mayhem. In 2017, he joined Treyarch, where he contributed scripts, storylines, and character designs to various Call of Duty games, such as Black Ops 4, Black Ops Cold War, Vanguard, and Modern Warfare III. He is currently a Senior Writer II at Treyarch, developing Zombies Mode content for upcoming Call of Duty releases.

== Writing bibliography ==
=== Valiant ===
- Valiant Reader (1993) #1
- Magnus Robot Fighter #32, #35-46, #49-54 (1994–95).
- Rai and the Future Force #18, #20-23 (1994).
- Rai #24-30, #33 (1994–95).
- Psi Lords #1-10 (1994–95)
- Shadowman #25 (1994).
- Turok: Dinosaur Hunter #17-19 (1994–95)
- Solar, Man of the Atom #55-59 (1996).

=== Broadway ===
- Powers That Be #6 (1996).
- Starseed #7 (1996).

=== Crusade ===
- Shi: The Series #1-2, #7-8 (1997–98).
- Tomoe: Unforgettable Fire #1 (1997).

=== DC/Vertigo ===
- Flinch #10 (3rd Story) (1999).

=== CrossGen ===
- Mystic #18-43 (2001–2003).
- Negation Prequel One-Shot (2001). Co-Writer with Mark Waid
- Negation #1-27 (2001–2004). Note: #1 & #2 Co-Written by Mark Waid
- CrossGen Chronicles #7 (2002).
- Route 666 #1-22 (2002–2004).
- Negation: Lawbringer #1 (2002).
- Mark of Charon #1-5 (2003).
- Kiss Kiss Bang Bang #1-5 (2004).
- Negation: War #1-2 (2004).

=== Marvel ===
- Exiles #46-89, Annual #1 (2004–2006).
- X-Men Unlimited Vol. 2 #6 (1st Story) (2005).
- Rogue vol.3, #7-12 (2005).
- X-Men: Age of Apocalypse One-Shot (2nd Story) (2005).
- Spider-Man: Breakout #1-5 (2005).
- What If...? Featuring Captain America #1 (2005).
- Untold Tales of the New Universe: Psi-Force #1 (2006).
- Uncanny X-Men #472-473 (scripts only), #474, Annual #1 (2006).
- Marvel Adventures: The Avengers #5 - #8 (2006).

=== DC ===
- DCU: Brave New World #1 ("Look to the Skies" framing sequence only) (2006).
- Supergirl and the Legion of Superheroes #20-22 (2006). Co-writer with Mark Waid
- Birds of Prey #100 (Black Canary story only), #109 - 112, #118-127 (2006, 2007, 2008–2009).
- DC: Infinite Holiday Special (Trials of Shazam Story Only, Gift of the Magi) (2006).
- JSA Classified #17-18, #25 (2006, 2007).
- Countdown #49, #45, #40, #36, #32, #28, #22, #19, #17-13 (2007–2008).
- Supergirl and the Legion of Superheroes #29, #31 - 36 (2007).
- Black Canary #1 - #4 (2007).
- Supergirl #20 - #22 (2007).
- Outsiders: Five of A Kind - Week 3: Thunder/Martian Manhunter (2007).
- Outsiders #50 (2007).
- DC Infinite Halloween Special - (Aquaman Story Only, Children of the Deep) (2007).
- Batman Confidential #13 - 16 (2008).
- R.E.B.E.L.S #1-28 (2009–2011).
- R.E.B.E.L.S Annual: Starro the Conqueror #1 (2009).
- The Great Ten #1-9 (2009–2010).
- Catwoman #83 (2010).
- Adventure Comics #7 (2010).
- Gotham City Sirens #12-15 (2010).
- Green Lantern Corps #48-63 (2010–2011).
- DC Universe Online Legends #1-2, #4, #6, #8, #12, #14 (2011). Co-writer with Marv Wolfman
- Flashpoint: Emperor Aquaman #1-3 (2011).
- Green Lantern: New Guardians #1-20, #0 (2011-2013).
- Blue Beetle #1-16, #0 (2011-2013).
- Sword of Sorcery (Beowulf story) #1-3, #0 (2012-2013)
- The Ravagers #10-12 (2013). Co-writer with Michael Nelson
- DC Universe Presents #19 (2013).
- Supergirl vol. 6 #26-35 (2013-2014).
- Supergirl: Futures End #1 (2014).
- Convergence: Aquaman #1-2 (2015).
- Convergence: Green Lantern/Parallax #1-2 (2015).
- Convergence: Speed Force #1-2 (2015).
- Teen Titans vol. 5 #20-24 (2016).

=== Image ===
- Retro Rocket #1-4 (2006–2007).

== Editing bibliography ==
=== Valiant ===
- Darque Passages #1 (1994)
- Harbinger #27-34 (1994)
- Ninjak #3-8 (1994)
- Turok, Dinosaur Hunter #11-16 (1994)

=== Crusade ===
- Angel Fire #1 (1997)

=== DC ===
- DC One Million #1-4 (1998)
- JLA #24 - 26, #28 - 42, #1,000,000 (1998–2000)
- Hourman #1-25 (1999–2001)
- Fanboy #1-6 (1999)
- All Star Comics 80 Page Giant #1 (1999)
- Day of Judgement Secret Files and Origins #1 (1999)
- Aquaman Vol. 5 #61 - #75 (1999–2001)
- Batman: No Man's Land Secret Files and Origins #1 (1999)
- Batman: Gotham City Secret Files and Origins #1 (2000)
- Wonder Woman #164 - 165 (2000)
- The Spectre #1 (2001)

=== DC\Vertigo ===
- Codename: Knockout #1-5 (2001)
- Hellblazer #158-165 (2001)
- Transmetropolitan #43-48 (2001)
- Adventures in the Rifle Brigade: Operation Bollock #1-2 (2001)

== Gameography ==
- Saints Row IV (2013)
- Agents of Mayhem (2017)
- Call of Duty: Black Ops 4 (2018)
- Call of Duty: Modern Warfare (2019)
- Call of Duty: Black Ops Cold War (2020)
- Call of Duty: Vanguard (2021)
- Call of Duty: Modern Warfare II (2022)
- Call of Duty: Modern Warfare III (2023)
- Call of Duty: Black Ops 6 (2024)
- Call of Duty: Black Ops 7 (2025)

Preceded by Joe Kelly	Supergirl writer 2007	Succeeded by Kelley Puckett
Preceded by Mark Waid	Legion of Super-Heroes writer 2007	Succeeded by Jim Shooter
Preceded by Gail Simone	Birds of Prey writer 2007-2009	Succeeded by Gail Simone
Preceded by Tom Peyer	R.E.B.E.L.S. writer 2009—2011	Succeeded by none
Preceded by Will Pfeifer	Catwoman writer 2010	Succeeded by Judd Winick
Preceded by Paul Dini	Gotham City Sirens writer 2010	Succeeded by Peter Calloway
Preceded by Michael Alan Nelson	Supergirl writer 2013–2014	Succeeded by Kate Perkins & Mike Johnson
