= Stevenson University =

Private university in Baltimore County, Maryland, US

- Former name: Villa Julie College (1947–2008)
- Motto: Pro Discendo, Pro Vivendo
- Motto in English: For Learning, For Living
- Type: Private university
- Established: 1947; 79 years ago
- Endowment: $89,906,530 (June 2018)
- President: Elliot Hirshman
- Faculty: 224
- Administrative staff: 344
- Students: 3,615 (Fall 2018)
- Undergraduates: 2,708
- Postgraduates: 502
- Other students: 405 (adult undergraduates)
- Location: Owings Mills and Stevenson, Maryland, United States; 39°25′17.37″N 76°42′4.87″W
- Campus: Stevenson: 60 acres (24 ha) Owings Mills: 221 acres (89 ha); Suburban
- Colors: Green and White
- Nickname: Mustangs
- Website: stevenson.edu

Stevenson University is a private university in Baltimore County, Maryland, United States, with two campuses, one in Stevenson and one in Owings Mills. The university enrolls approximately 3,615 undergraduate and graduate students. Formerly known as Villa Julie College, the name was changed to Stevenson University in 2008.

== History ==
=== Founding ===
Stevenson University was founded in Maryland as Villa Julie College in 1947 by the Roman Catholic women's religious order Sisters of Notre Dame de Namur as a one-year school training women to become medical secretaries. The college was named for Saint Julie Billiart, foundress of the Sisters of Notre Dame.

Stevenson's Greenspring Valley campus is in the Green Spring Valley area within northwestern portion of Baltimore County. It is located on the 60-acre (240,000 m^{2}) former estate of the George Carroll Jenkins family. The estate's name was "Seven Oaks", a reference to huge old oak trees planted on the property. They were thought to mark a traditional Lenni Lenape burial ground. One of these seven oaks still survived on campus until August 2007, when it was deemed potentially hazardous and cut down.

=== Accreditation and expansion (1950s–1990s) ===
School logo until 2008

Villa Julie was approved as a two-year college by the Maryland State Department of Education in 1954 and received its first Middle States Association of Colleges and Schools accreditation in 1962. In 1967, the college established a board of trustees and became independent of the Sisters of Notre Dame de Namur and the Roman Catholic Church. Villa Julie became coeducational in 1972, admitting its first male student that year.

Bachelor's degree programs were added in 1984, starting with degrees in computer information systems and paralegal studies.

Traditionally a commuter college for local residents, by the early 1990s Villa Julie started attracting students interested in college housing. Without the proper zoning for such an addition to the Stevenson campus, the college leased off-campus apartments in Pikesville and later in the county seat of Towson, where resident students began living in 1993. Villa Julie was granted admission to the National Collegiate Athletic Association and its NCAA Division III in 1994.

It started offering master's degrees in 1995. A major 1997 campus expansion more than doubled the amount of instructional space on campus, including expanded athletic facilities.

=== Continued growth ===
On October 28, 2000, Villa Julie College inaugurated its fourth president Kevin J. Manning, who succeeded Carolyn Manuszak. Under Manning, enrollment continued to increase and the demand for college-owned student housing intensified. The college broke ground on a second campus in Owings Mills in August 2003, opening it a year later. The Owings Mills campus included several major residence complexes. In 2006 Rockland Center, a new student union and dining hall, was completed. The Caves Sports and Wellness Center also opened that same year.

=== Stevenson University (2007–present) ===
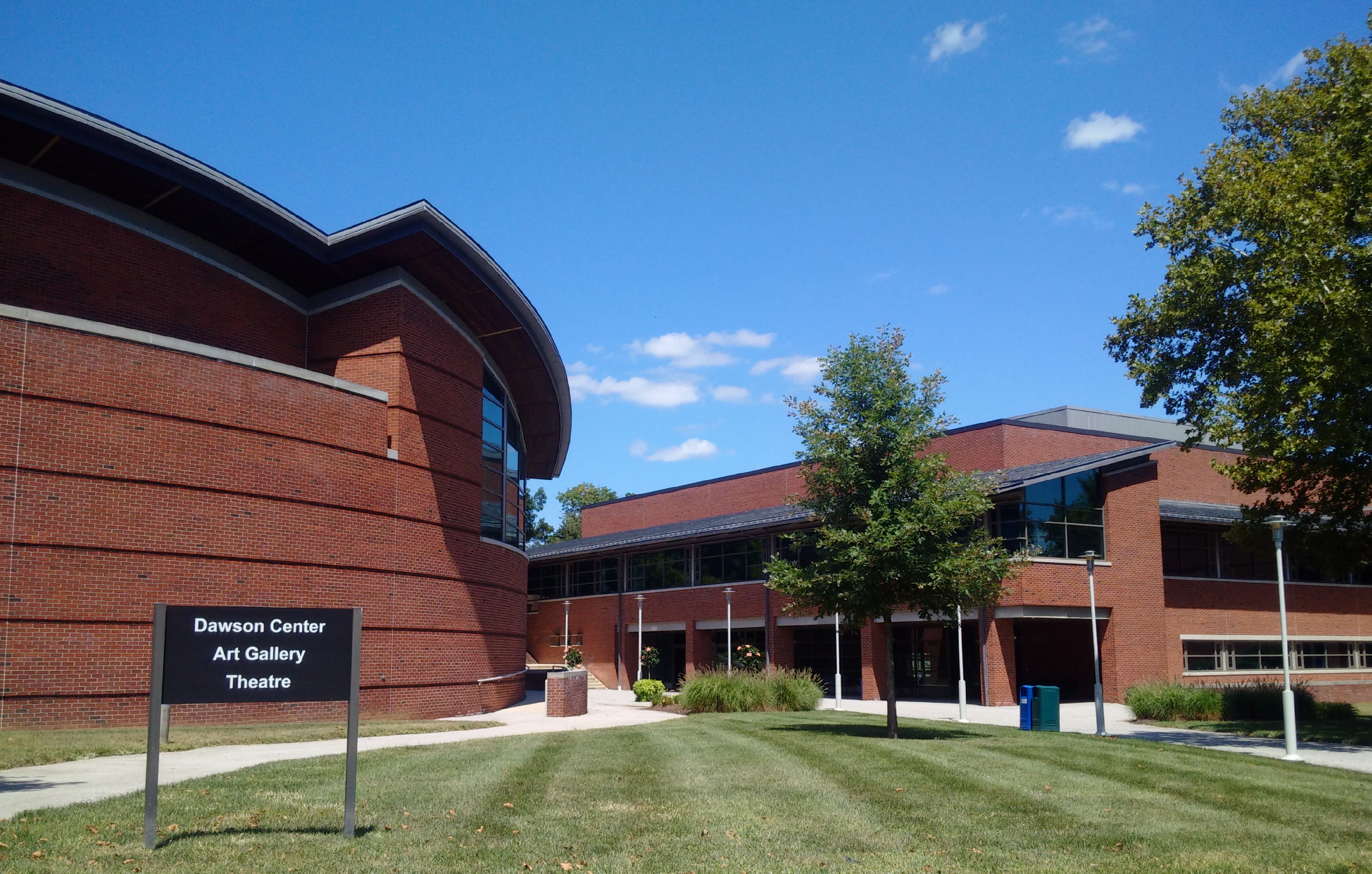
Dawson Center, Greenspring campus, named for longtime dean and college vice-president, Helen Rose Dawson

In late 2007, the school's leaders decided to make changes needed to attain university status. Meetings were held to help determine whether the name should be changed to Villa Julie University, or something different, given its broader reach. Other names considered were Great Oaks University, Tufton University, Greenspring University, Rockland University, Sagamore University, and Billiart University. On June 11, 2008, the university's board of trustees voted to name the school Stevenson University: it referred to the original location of Villa Julie College and Robert Stevenson, a prominent Baltimore grain merchant who married Deborah Owings, the granddaughter of the founder of Owings Mills.

Today, Stevenson University is composed of seven schools. The Howard S. Brown School of Business and Leadership opened for the fall 2008 semester and houses the school's Accounting, Business Administration, Business Information Systems, Computer Information Systems, Marketing, and Cybersecurity and Digital Forensics programs. Formerly housed on the Greenspring campus, the School of Design moved to a new building on a property purchased from Shire Pharmaceuticals in 2013 to create what is now the Owings Mills North location of the Owings Mills campus. In September 2016, the 200,000 sq ft (19,000 m^{2}) Kevin J. Manning Academic Center opened and today houses the Beverly K. Fine School of the Sciences, the Sandra R. Berman School of Nursing and Health Professions, and additional facilities for the School of Design. Facilities in Garrison Hall on the Owings Mills campus serve as the headquarters for Stevenson University Online, the university's online school for working professionals seeking master's degrees or to complete a bachelor's degree. The School of Humanities and Social Sciences and School of Education remains on the Greenspring campus.

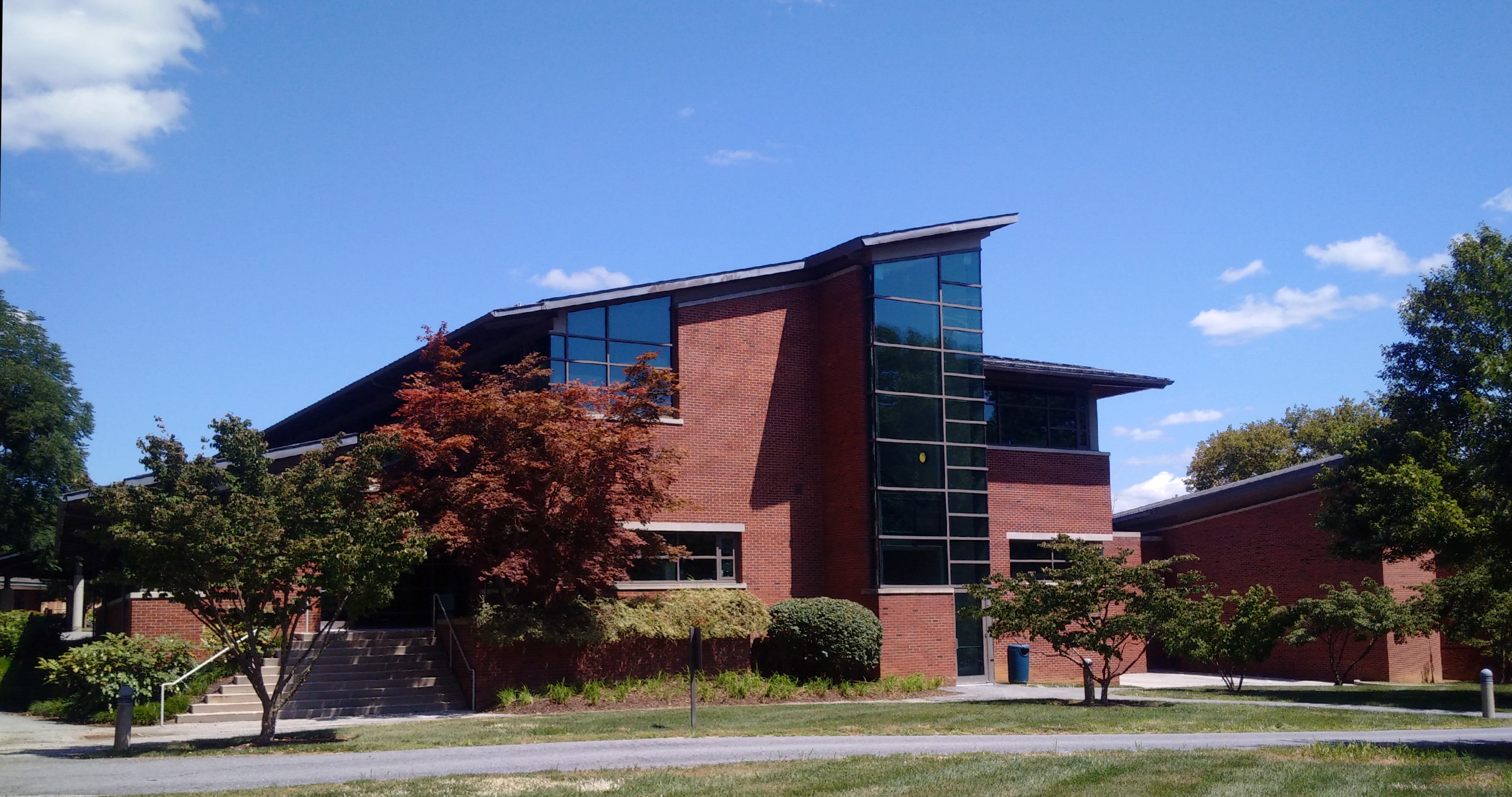
Greenspring campus buildings

On July 3, 2017, Stevenson University's sixth president, Elliot Hirshman, joined the university after serving as president of San Diego State University since 2011 and previously as provost and senior vice president for Academic Affairs at the University of Maryland, Baltimore County.

The university expanded its athletic facilities in 2010 with the opening of a 35,000 sq ft (3,300 m^{2}) gymnasium and the 3,500-seat Mustang Stadium on the Owings Mills Campus. In summer 2017, Stevenson University reached an agreement with the state of Maryland to acquire the former Rosewood Center property in Owings Mills. The 117-acre site is adjacent to Stevenson's existing Owings Mills campus and nearly doubles the total acreage of the university. The Rosewood project has included remediation and demolition of 20 buildings on the site in spring 2018. Grading of the site began in summer 2018.

== Academics ==
=== Undergraduate programs ===
Stevenson offers over 90 majors, minors, tracks, and concentrations. All degree programs have a core curriculum in the liberal arts and a career emphasis. In 2018, the university introduced five professional minors—Applied Management, Entrepreneurship and Small Business Development, Human Resources, Real Estate, and Software Design and Coding. The school reported that 92 percent of graduates were employed or started graduate school within six months of graduation.

Traditional undergraduate students can also complete a master's degree program through the university's bachelor's to master's option, designed to allow completion of both degrees in five years.

=== Leadership, Service, and Honors Scholars programs ===
Stevenson offers Leadership, Service, and Honors Scholars programs for students who wish to engage in leadership education, extend their civic engagement with the community, or partake in rigorous academic opportunities.

=== Online programs ===
Stevenson University Online, formerly the School of Graduate and Professional Studies, offers online master's, bachelor's, and certificate programs for working professionals. Admission is granted on a rolling basis, and courses are offered year-round in 8-week sessions. Areas of study include nursing and healthcare; forensics, cyber forensics, law, and criminal justice; business & technology management and business communications; community-based education and leadership; and STEM-focused teaching.

=== Enrollment ===
Stevenson University enrolls approximately 3,600 undergraduate and graduate students in more than 40 bachelor's and master's degree programs. Stevenson's total enrollment has more than doubled since 2001.

== Student life ==
=== Residence life and activities ===
The freshman enrollment and housing enrollments rose dramatically between 2009–2010 and 2010–2011. In the fall semester 2010, there were over 900 freshman students, around 700 of whom were residents. In 2013, nearly 2,000 students lived in 13 residence halls on the Owings Mills campus.

In February 2018, Stevenson opened a Student Activities Commons in Garrison Hall on the Owings Mills campus to serve as a student club and activities center. The Commons include club sports offices, three meeting rooms, a fitness center, and a console video gaming room. It also serves as the home for Stevenson's esports team, which has its own esports arena. In fall 2018, a reading room and the university's fourth fitness center were also opened in Garrison Hall.

From community services and the arts to education and religion, there are more than 80 clubs and extracurricular activities for students. Mustang Activities and Programming (MAP) hosts over 40 student events a year, popular events include: Homecoming, Founders Day Talent Show, Rockland Blowout, and Food Truck Rally.

=== Athletics ===
Stevenson athletics wordmark

The university's athletic facilities include the Caves Sports and Wellness Center (formerly the training facility of the Baltimore Colts), the Owings Mills gymnasium, and Mustang Stadium. In 2017, purchase of the Rosewood property has been further developed into what is now known as East Campus. The newest campus features spaces for field hockey, soccer, baseball, softball, and track and field.

Stevenson teams participate as a member of the National Collegiate Athletic Association's Division III. The Mustangs are a member of the Middle Atlantic Conference (MAC). Stevenson used to compete in the Capital Athletic Conference(now the Coast-to-Coast Conference [C2C]) from 2007–08 to 2011–12.

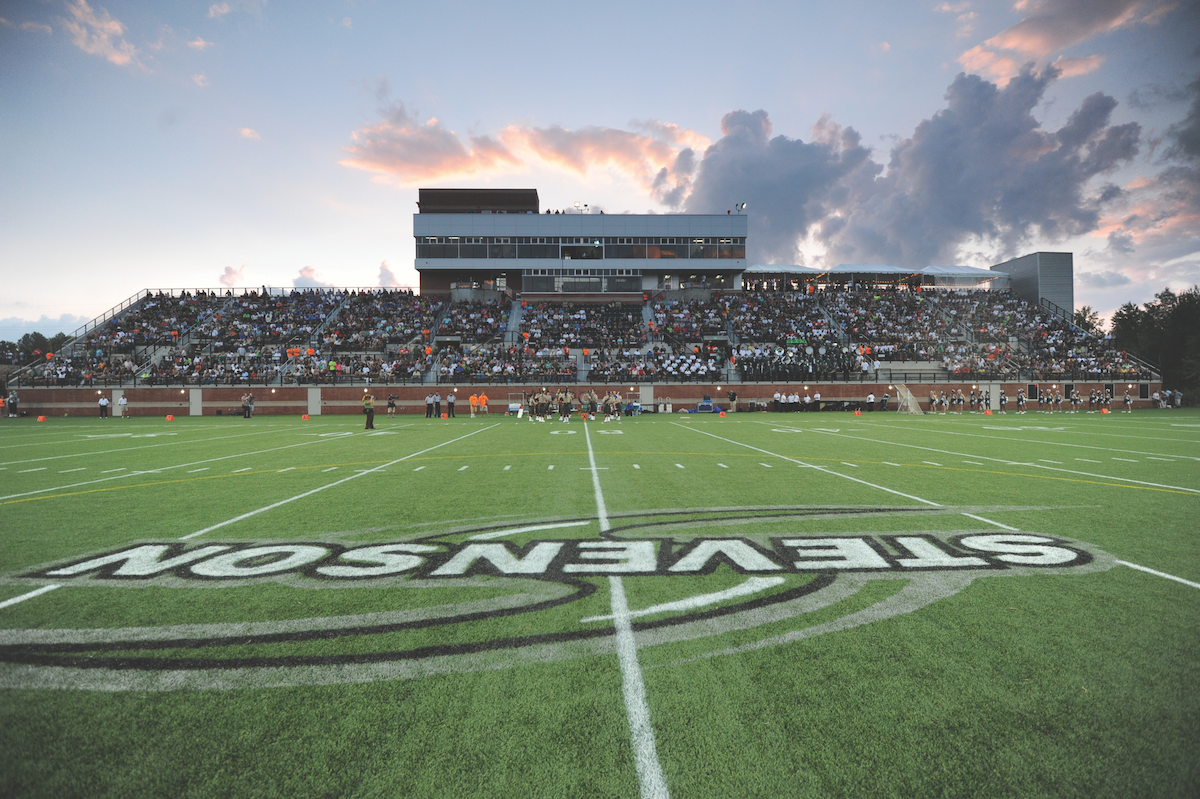
Mustang Stadium

Men's sports include baseball, basketball, cross country, football, golf, ice hockey, lacrosse, soccer, tennis, track & field, volleyball and swimming. Women's sports include basketball, cross country, field hockey, golf, ice hockey, lacrosse, soccer, softball, tennis, track & field (indoor and outdoor), volleyball (indoor and beach), and swimming. Men's and women's ice hockey compete in the United Collegiate Hockey Conference.

In 2016, Stevenson University became the first NCAA Division III Institution to add Women's Beach Volleyball as a collegiate sport. This is also the same year men's ice hockey began their first season of competition. In Spring of 2022, Stevenson broadened their sport count to 28 with the addition of Acrobatics & Tumbling, a competitive sport with similarities to cheer, gymnastics, and stunt. In September of that same year, Stevenson began their first season of competition for their 29th sport, Men's Beach Volleyball, hosting the USA Volleyball Men's Beach Collegiate Challenge tournament for the first time that year.

In 2013, the Stevenson Mustangs men's lacrosse team took home the 2013 Division III national championship, the first national championship of any kind for the school. They advanced to the finals after defeating their rival Salisbury University. Overall, as of Fall 2018, Stevenson has won 39 conference championships.

=== Greek life ===
In Spring 2018, the university invited two national fraternities, Phi Mu Delta and Phi Beta Sigma, to colonize on campus. The university has three sororities, Alpha Kappa Alpha, Phi Mu and Phi Sigma Sigma.

=== Marching band ===
With the induction of the football team in 2011, the university added a marching band. The Stevenson University Marching 100 is a modern-style marching band that plays both contemporary and traditional marching band music. The band uses woodwind, brass, and percussion instruments along with synthesizers, guitars, and color guard. The band plays at football games, open houses, and other university events. It is directed by Mark Lortz.

== Arts and culture ==
Since 2006, Stevenson University has sponsored the Baltimore Speakers Series, which takes place at the Joseph Meyerhoff Center in Baltimore City. Speakers have included former President Bill Clinton, electronics engineer Steve Wozniak, former FBI director James Comey, television journalist Tom Brokaw, Monty Python actor John Cleese, former First Lady Laura Bush, author and radio personality Garrison Keillor, and author/historian Doris Kearns Goodwin.

Through its Arts Alive! initiative, the university offers a year-round calendar of cultural programs, including art exhibitions, theatre productions, film screenings, musical performances, and guest speakers. Arts Alive is a way for students, faculty and staff, and members of the art community to showcase their work.

== Notable alumni ==
- Christine Michel Carter, author, writer, and marketing strategist
- Martha Scanlan Klima, former member of Maryland House of Delegates
