= Andrew M. Schuster =

United States Army general

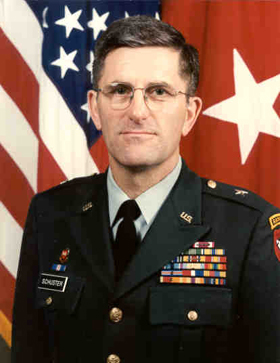
Brigadier General Andrew M. Schuster

Andrew M. Schuster is a retired brigadier general in the National Guard of the United States and former Assistant Adjutant General of Readiness and Training in Wisconsin.

== Education ==
- B.S., Business/Economics - Mount Senario College
- M.S., Public Administration - Shippensburg University of Pennsylvania

== Career ==
Schuster originally enlisted in the military in 1965 and was commissioned a second lieutenant in 1969 as a member of the 32nd Infantry Brigade of the Wisconsin Army National Guard. In 1970 he would become a member of the elite United States Army Rangers. Schuster's duties included mobilizing and deploying Wisconsin Army National Guard units to serve in the Gulf War, Kosovo War, and Bosnian War, as well and humanitarian missions to Germany, Panama, and Central America.

Awards he has received include the Meritorious Service Medal with three oak leaf clusters, the Army Commendation Medal, the Air Force Commendation Medal, the Army Reserve Components Achievement Medal with silver oak leaf cluster and two bronze oak leaf clusters, the National Defense Service Medal, the Humanitarian Service Medal, the Armed Forces Reserve Medal with gold hourglass device, the Army Service Ribbon, and the Army Reserve Components Overseas Training Ribbon with award numeral 6.
