= Robert L. Myers (1862–1943) =

American politician and educator (1862–1943)

Member of the Pennsylvania House of Representatives from the Cumberland County district
- In office 1899–1904

Personal details
- Born: November 16, 1862 Round Hill, Adams County, Pennsylvania, U.S.
- Died: March 23, 1943 (aged 80) Camp Hill, Pennsylvania, U.S.
- Spouse: Joanna Bowman (m. 1887)
- Children: 4
- Education: Cumberland Valley State Normal School
- Occupation: Politician; educator

Robert L. Myers (November 16, 1862 – March 23, 1943) was an American politician and educator from Pennsylvania. He served as a member of the Pennsylvania House of Representatives from 1899 to 1904.

== Early life ==
Robert L. Myers was born on November 16, 1862, in Round Hill, Adams County, Pennsylvania, to Margaret (née Berkheimer) and Adam Smyser Myers. His father was a farmer and owned a country store. He attended public schools in Adams County and Baugher's Academy. He graduated from Cumberland Valley State Normal School (later Shippensburg University of Pennsylvania) in 1885.

== Career ==
Myers worked as a carpenter's apprentice. He was a teacher and school supervisor in Adams County. He also supervised at White Hall Soldiers' Orphans School and in Dauphin County and Wiconisco. In 1890, he moved to Camp Hill, where he was a school director. He was founder and manager of the National Educational Bureau and was a publisher at Myers, Fishel and Company. He organized R. L. Myers & Company, a publishing house. He served on the Camp Hill School Board for ten years and was a member of the council of Camp Hill.

Myers was elected as a Democrat to the Pennsylvania House of Representatives, representing Cumberland County from 1899 to 1904. He opposed the continuation of the building commission, which was charged with construction of the state capitol. He introduced a bill to consolidate rural schools. He organized Cumberland Valley Bank of Lemoyne with John F. Dapp in 1905. He remained president when it was renamed Lemoyne Trust Company in 1911. He remained president until around 1942.

== Personal life ==
Myers married Joanna Bowman, daughter of John D. Bowman, of Camp Hill on October 31, 1887. They had two daughter and two sons, Mrs. Howard F. Sigler, Mrs. James McDonald, John E. and Robert L. Jr.

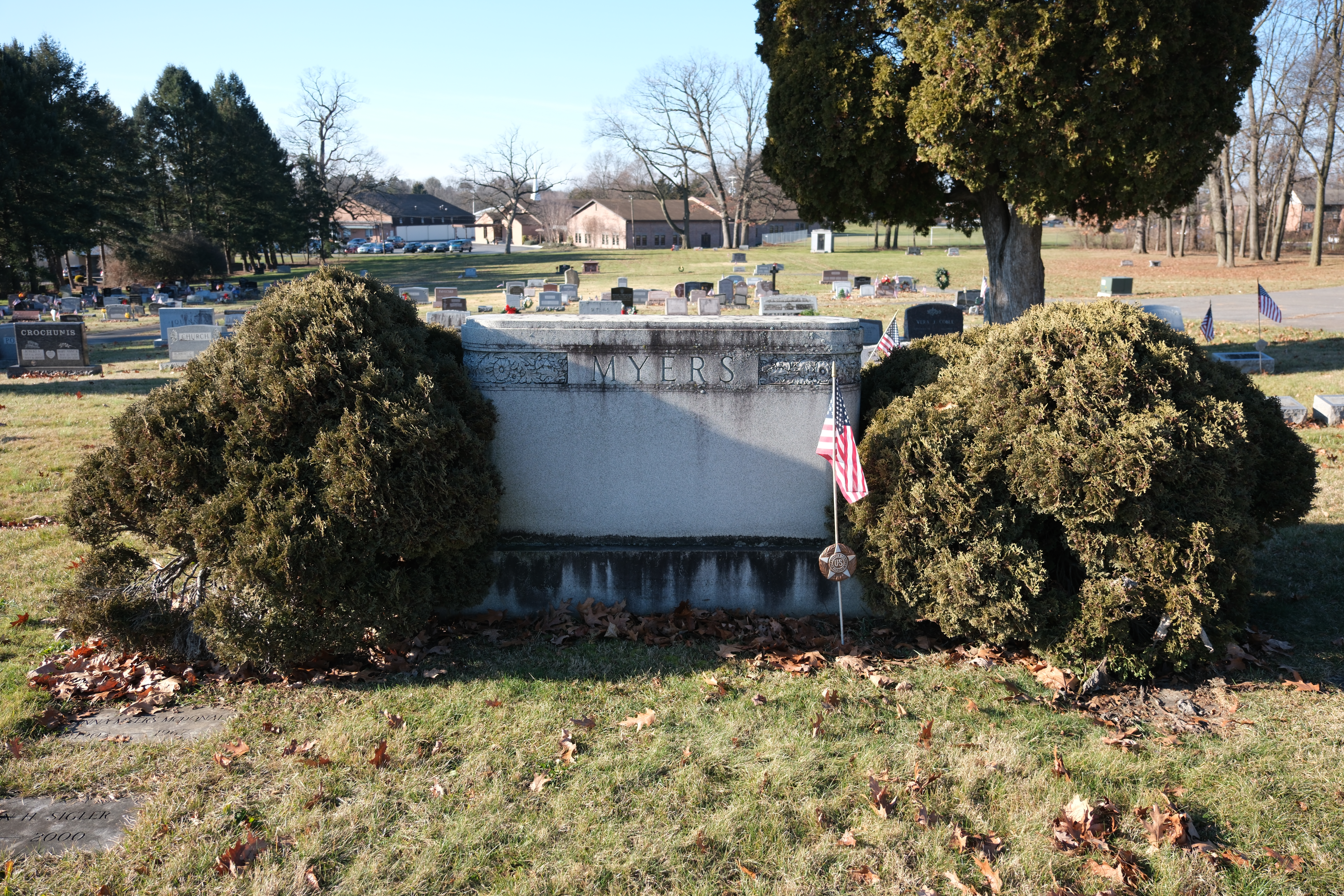
Grave of Myers in Saint John's Cemetery

Myers died on March 23, 1943, at his home on Market Street in Camp Hill. He was buried in Saint John's Cemetery in Shiremanstown.
