= Kevin J. Manning =

American university administrator

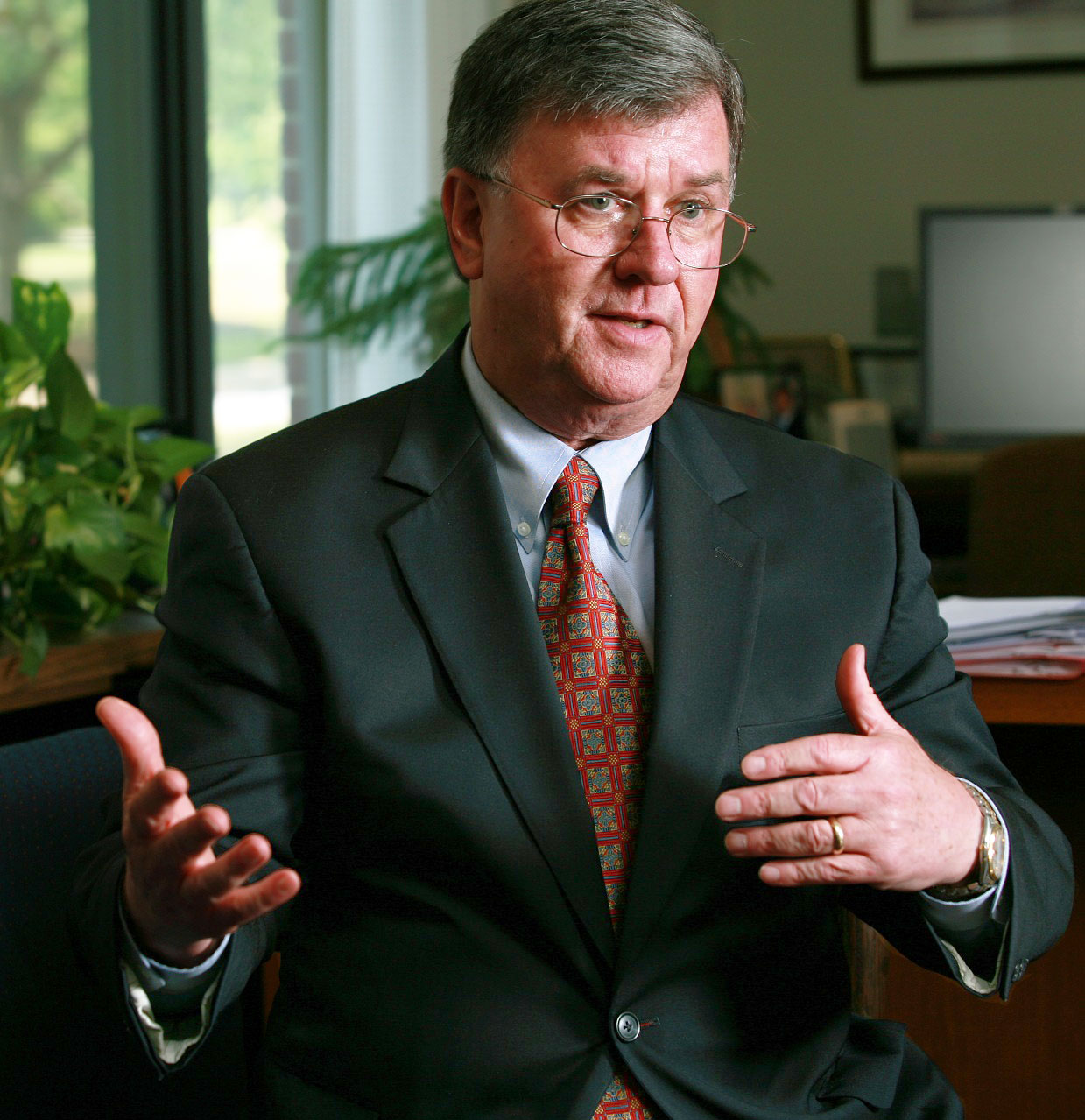
- Born: November 8, 1944 (age 81)
- Education: Webster University
- Occupation: University President
- Website: Bio

Kevin J. Manning (born November 8, 1944, in New York, New York) is the former president of Stevenson University, the former Villa Julie College and the third largest independent university in Maryland. He was inaugurated as the fourth president of Villa Julie College on October 28, 2000, succeeding Carolyn Manuszak. He resigned from Stevenson University on November 29, 2016.

== Academic career ==
Manning graduated from of Webster University in St. Louis, Missouri in 1967, and earned his M.S. in Counseling and Student Personnel from Shippensburg University in 1976. He received a Ph.D. in Higher Education Administration from Ohio State University in 1982. Prior to his service at Stevenson, Manning held administrative positions at Washington University in St. Louis, Missouri; Elizabethtown College in Elizabethtown, Pennsylvania; and Immaculata University in Malvern, Pennsylvania.

== Stevenson presidency ==
After assuming the presidency of Villa Julie College in 2000, Manning led the institution through its transition to university status and its name change to Stevenson University in June 2008.

In December 2011, the Chronicle of Higher Education listed Manning among the highest-paid college presidents in the country based on his 2009 salary of $1,493,655, although nearly two-thirds of the salary was a one-time deferred compensation payment accumulated during his first nine years as president of Stevenson. Manning's salary that year represented almost 2 percent of Stevenson's budget and was 16.1 times the university's average faculty salary of $92,500.

In 2004, Manning established the institution's second campus in Owings Mills, Maryland, a move critical to transitioning the former commuter college into a residential university. Manning has focused on growing the 100-plus acre Owings Mills campus by adding additional residences, a student community center, a dining and student center, the Brown School of Business and Leadership, the Caves Sports and Wellness Center, a gymnasium, and Mustang Stadium to host the university's field sports. In 2009, he announced that Stevenson would be adding football to its roster of NCAA Division III sports programs. In November 2011, Manning oversaw the purchase of the Shire Plc property in Owings Mills, Maryland, which increased the Owings Mills campus by 29 acres of land and 170,000 square feet of laboratory, classroom, and office space.

In March 2009, Manning approved a university restructuring plan for the formal creation of the university's six schools led by deans: the Brown School of Business and leadership; the School of Design; the School of Education; the School of Humanities and Social Sciences; the School of the Sciences; and the School of Graduate and Professional Studies.

Manning's presidency has played a pivotal role in building Stevenson University's reputation as a national leader in career education. U.S. News & World Report’s America’s Best Colleges ranking named Stevenson a “Best Value” college in 2005. Stevenson was named one of the nation's “Up-and-Coming Schools” in the 2012 edition of America's Best Colleges.

== Awards ==
Manning was recognized as a Maryland Innovator of the Year by The Daily Record in September 2003 for the creation of Stevenson's Career Architecture approach to undergraduate education. In 2007, he received the Ernst & Young Entrepreneur of The Year Award in the education category in Maryland.

In February 2011, Manning was appointed to the Board of Directors of the National Association of Independent Colleges and Universities (NAICU), representing NAICU Region II member institutions from Maryland, Delaware, the District of Columbia, New Jersey, and New York. He was also named an "Influential Marylander" by the editorial board of the Daily Record (Maryland) business and legal newspaper.
