= Descent into the Depths of the Earth =

Dungeons & Dragons adventure module

- The cover of the 1981 Descent into the Depths of the Earth compilation module, with art by Jim Roslof. The artwork depicts a party of adventurers fighting a band of kuo-toa.
- Code: D1–2, D3
- TSR product code: 9059, 9021
- Rules required: Advanced Dungeons & Dragons 1st edition
- Character levels: 9–14, 10–14
- Campaign setting: Greyhawk
- Authors: Gary Gygax
- First published: 1978

Linked modules
- G1 G2 G3 D1 D2 D3 Q1

Descent Into the Depths of the Earth is an adventure module for the Dungeons & Dragons (D&D) fantasy roleplaying game coded D1–2. It was written by Gary Gygax, and combines two previously published modules from 1978, the original Descent into the Depths of the Earth and Shrine of the Kuo-Toa. A sequel to the first two modules, Vault of the Drow, was also published in 1978. All of these D-series modules were produced for use with the 1st edition Advanced Dungeons & Dragons (AD&D) rules.

The D-series itself is part of a larger overall campaign of adventures set in the World of Greyhawk campaign setting. The overall campaign begins with the three modules in the Against the Giants series, continues through the D-series, and concludes with module Q1 Queen of the Demonweb Pits. The latter segments of the campaign, including the D-series and module Q1, are set in a vast network of caverns and tunnels called the Underdark.

== Plot summary ==
The plot of the original modules Descent Into the Depths of the Earth and Shrine of the Kuo-Toa places a party of player characters (PCs) on the trail of the drow priestess Eclavdra through the Underdark, a vast subterranean network of interconnected caverns and tunnels, battling various creatures on their journey.

In the last module in the preceding G-series, Hall of the Fire Giant King, the PCs were supposed to have discovered that the drow had instigated the alliance between the races of giants and their attacks on neighboring humans. The drow that survived the party's incursion have fled into tunnels leading deep into the earth. The characters will have reached the bottom of the dungeon beneath the cave-castle of King Snurre. In D1 Descent Into the Depths of the Earth, the PCs seek the home of the drow by traveling through an underground world of caves and passages. In the tunnels, the characters first major fight is against a well-armed drow patrol, and the next is against a raiding party composed of mind flayers and wererats, who are torturing a drow that they captured while patrolling. The characters also find a grand cavern populated by drow soldiers, purple worms, a lich, a group of undead, a giant slug, sphinxes, trolls, bugbears, troglodytes, wyverns, and fungi.

D2 Shrine of the Kuo-Toa continues with the party still in pursuit of the drow. The party encounters a kuo-toan rogue monitor who helps them cross a large river for a fee. A party of Svirfneblin (or deep gnomes) approaches the player characters on the other side, and the party has a chance to convince them to help them fight against the drow. As the party travels, signs of the drow are all around; the drow are allowed to pass through these subterranean areas, even though they are hated and feared by the other local intelligent races. The party then moves through kuo-toa territory, ruled by the Priest-Prince Va-Guulgh. If the PCs appease the kuo-toa and respect their customs, the evil kuo-toa are not openly hostile to the party, but will attack if the party gives them a reason. The party learns that the drow and kuo-toa trade with each other openly, but the kuo-toa hate and fear the drow, resulting in frequent skirmishes between the two peoples.

D3 Vault of the Drow is set in Erelhei-Cinlu, an underground stronghold of the drow, and the Fane of Lolth, their evil spider-goddess. After traveling for league after league into the Underdark, the adventurers come upon Erelhei-Cinlu, the vast subterranean city of the drow. The adventure is written in a very open-ended fashion, giving the Dungeon Master (DM) free rein to script any number of mini-campaigns or adventures taking place inside the drow capital. An extensive overview of the drow power structure is given for just this purpose. Eventually, the players may discover an astral gate leading to the plane of the Abyss, leading into the Q1 module.

== Publication history ==
The original modules Descent Into the Depths of the Earth and Shrine of the Kuo-Toa were both written by Gary Gygax and published by TSR, Inc. in 1978. Gygax had recently finished writing the Player's Handbook (1978), and according to Gygax, he authored the D series "as sort of a relaxation to get away from writing rules". Descent Into the Depths of the Earth, the first module of the D-series, was printed as a sixteen-page booklet, and Shrine of the Kuo-Toa, second of the three-part D-series was twenty pages; both featured an outer folder. Both modules were released before the Dungeon Masters Guide and Players Handbook. Both modules were reprinted in the omnibus collection D1-2 Descent Into the Depths in 1981, as a 32-page booklet with an outer folder. The original versions of the D1 and D2 modules both featured monochrome cover artwork by David C. Sutherland III, but the 1981 compilation was released with a color cover illustrated by Jim Roslof. Sutherland's interior artwork from the original two publications was included in the compilation, as was that of David A. Trampier. Other artists whose work appears inside the compilation include Jeff Dee, Erol Otus, David S. LaForce, Bill Willingham and Roslof.

Vault of the Drow, also by Gygax and the last of the D-series, was also originally published in 1978 as a 32-page booklet with a two-color outer cover. The original printing featured monochrome cover artwork by David C. Sutherland III. In 1981, TSR re-issued the adventure with a new color cover. D3 was re-released to coincide with the release of the D1-2 compilation Descent into the Depths of the Earth. Since the D1-2 compilation featured color cover artwork, Erol Otus was tasked with creating a new color cover for D3 as well. Sutherland's interior artwork was retained, and other interior artists for the module include Jeff Dee, David S. LaForce, David A. Trampier, and Otus. The entire campaign was eventually combined into a supermodule GDQ1-7 - Queen of the Spiders.

The modules were intended to function as a sequel for the G-series adventures. At the time these modules were released, each Dungeons & Dragons module was marked with an alphanumeric code indicating the series to which it belonged. The D in the module code represents the first letter in the word Drow. According to a Wired.com article, the D-series "introduced the world to the concept of the dark elves." Game statistics for the Drow first appear in the module, although the 1977 edition of the Monster Manual does mention the Drow.

The D-series is part of a larger overall campaign of adventures set in the World of Greyhawk campaign setting. The overall campaign begins with the three modules in the G1–3 Against the Giants series, continues through the D-series, and concludes with module Q1 Queen of the Demonweb Pits. The latter segments of the campaign, including the D-series and module Q1, are set in a vast network of caverns and tunnels called the Underdark. The entire campaign was eventually combined into a supermodule GDQ1-7 Queen of the Spiders. Descent into the Depths of the Earth was the basis for a 2000 novel of the same title by Paul Kidd.

The original TSR product codes for modules D1, D2, and D3 are 9019, 9020, and 9021 respectively (9021 being reused for the new Erol Otus cover with the blue background).

== Reception ==
When combined with the G-series and Q module as the Queen of the Spiders, the D-series was voted the single greatest adventure of all time by Dungeon magazine in 2004. Reviewer Alan Kohler said, "The Underdark has become a classic place to set adventures... This is where it all got started." According to the editors, Vault of the Drow would have made the top five if it had been considered as a single module. They felt the Drow city detailed in the module offered "more intrigue" than any module previously. Judge Clark Peterson compared it favorably to City State of the Invincible Overlord, which also had a complicated city environment, saying "this was an underground city of evil monsters—the Drow, who, then, were new and mysterious as opposed to tired and overused as they are today." Dungeon Master for Dummies lists Descent into the Depths of the Earth as one of the ten best classic adventures, noting that it takes "the player characters into the underground world of the Drow—the wildly popular dark elves of D&D lore."

The series has received considerable praise. It was reviewed by Don Turnbull in British RPG magazine White Dwarf No. 11, who gave it 10 out of 10. He compared the series favorably to the G series of modules, which he also liked. Turnbull commented that the scope was large, and that the modules were of good value. Although D3 can be played by itself, he speculated that the party of characters may need the magic items that can be acquired in the first two to not be put at a disadvantage. Turnbull did lament that the series was designed for parties of a high level, making it difficult to use with a group of lower level characters. He concluded the review by saying "don't be surprised if they eclipse in quality most of the material you already have." All three modules are also profiled in Heroic Worlds, Lawrence Schick's 1991 guide to role-playing games.

The D-series of modules was also given an extensive overview review by Turnbull in issue No. 15 of White Dwarf, wherein he cautioned DMs that running these modules was unlike any they had run before. He commented that the adventure would be too difficult for most groups of player characters, and speculated that buyers wouldn't actually play the modules because it would take a lot of sessions to finish. He did run the adventure himself, though. He recommended using miniatures on a grid, because some of the battles involved so many characters and monsters. He also recommended rolling the dice for various encounters in advance. Although some such work would be wasted when the players chose one route over another, "it will be worth the effort." He also thought that planning enemy tactics in advance was a good idea, providing an example of how to do so using the Drow outpost from D1, as well as other encounters.

He noted that while some DMs may ban psionics in their games, if they don't allow the creatures in section M12 of D1 to use them, the game will be unbalanced in favor of the players. Although he hadn't run D3 at the time of writing the article, he wrote that the thought of planning some of its encounters "brings me out in perspiration." The power levels of his regular players' characters were insufficient for the adventure, so he gave them pre-generated ones. Although he felt the magical weapons he gave these characters were too powerful, he warned that giving weapons that are too weak would be a bigger problem. He also recommended many healing spells and potions.

Overall, he enjoyed playing the modules, despite wishing he had prepared more, and thought that his players also enjoyed the experience. He hoped that people would not be scared to use the modules because of their difficulty. In summary, he said "I can give no higher praise to these designs than to say they are as good as anyone is likely to meet, and better than almost everything else I've seen."

Reviewer Anders Swenson reviewed the D1–2 Descent into the Depths of the Earth compilation in 1982 for Different Worlds #21. Swenson noted that purchasers of adventure publications had come to expect longer texts for the given price, so that the two adventures had been combined into one format; redundant text was eliminated, and new illustrations were added to fill the resultant gaps in layout. He was perplexed by all of the creatures found in the grand cavern area originally found in module D1: "All these creatures are apparently expected to do nothing but sit in their caves and wait to be attacked, for they would certainly defeat any moderately tough adventurer party specified by the author if they all tried a massed and well-coordinated attack." He also wondered about the placement of the kuo-toan shrine: "There is great hostility between the Kuo Toa and the Drow, so it is surprising to find the main Kuo Toa stronghold in the middle of a thoroughfare used by the Drow as a main route. It is also surprising to find the Kuo Toa still in business, given the seeming superior military power of the Drow, but who knows?" Anders felt that the adventures contained a great deal of imaginative material, "but while the writing style is by no means poor, the combination of florid prose and new ideas makes a text which is relatively difficult to read. Gygax does not make a regular practice of organizing his text to help the poor GM pick out the important information quickly." However, Swenson concluded that this is overall a worthwhile adventure. "The plot is interesting, and everything is well detailed. Aside from the problems I have already noted, the adventures are interesting and generally of superior quality."

Francesco Cacciatore for Polygon commented in 2025 that "This natural dungeon/ecology factor is on full display in D1 and D2, where the real antagonist is the Underdark. However, modern players should not expect something as detailed and nuanced as Out of the Abyss. This is essentially a hexcrawl populated with deadly random encounters, as well as some fixed encounters designed to advance the story."
