= Against the Giants =

Role-playing game adventure by Gary Gygax

- Cover of the Against the Giants compilation module with art by Bill Willingham
- Code: G1-2-3
- TSR product code: 9058
- Rules required: Advanced Dungeons & Dragons 1st edition
- Character levels: 8–12
- Campaign setting: Greyhawk
- Authors: Gary Gygax
- First published: 1981

Linked modules
- G1 G2 G3 D1 D2 D3 Q1

Against the Giants is an adventure module written by Gary Gygax and published by TSR in 1981 for the Dungeons & Dragons fantasy role-playing game. It combines the G series of modules previously published in 1978: Steading of the Hill Giant Chief, Glacial Rift of the Frost Giant Jarl, and Hall of the Fire Giant King. All three were produced for use with the 1st edition Advanced Dungeons & Dragons rules. In 1999, to recognize the 25th anniversary of TSR, the company released an updated version, Against the Giants: The Liberation of Geoff. Later in 1999, Wizards of the Coast published a novelization of Against the Giants by Ru Emerson.

The plot of each of the three original modules focuses on a different type of evil giant. Each can be played as a standalone adventure, or as a series. In Steading of the Hill Giant Chief, a tribe of hill giants have been raiding lands occupied by humans, and the humans hire the player characters to defeat them. Glacial Rift of the Frost Giant Jarl pits the player characters against the evil Jarl of the frost giants. Hall of the Fire Giant King concludes the series, this time against a group of fire giants. The first two modules disclose the existence of a secret force behind the giants, which in the third module is revealed to be evil drow elves. The plot involving the drow continues in four additional modules printed between 1978 and 1980.

The modules were well received by contemporary critics. In 1978, they earned a 9/10 overall rating from a White Dwarf magazine reviewer, who was impressed that Gygax found time to write them while also working on the Advanced Dungeons & Dragons (AD&D) rulebooks. White Dwarf also reviewed the re-released G module series in 1982, giving it a 10 out of 10. The Queen of the Spiders supermodule, which consisted of the three modules combined with the subsequent modules in the "D" series and Q1 Queen of the Demonweb Pits, was voted the single greatest adventure of all time by Dungeon magazine in 2004, on the 30th anniversary of the Dungeons & Dragons game.

== Plot summary ==
Each of the original three modules is a dungeon crawl. The player characters focus on battling first hill giants, then frost giants, and finally fire giants, three of the original evil giant types used in Dungeons & Dragons.

=== G1 Steading of the Hill Giant Chief ===
The module begins with a prologue explaining that giants of different types have been raiding lands occupied by humans. Angered by this, the human rulers hire a group of adventurers (the player characters) to "punish the miscreant giants." The players' party is informed that they must defeat the giants, or have their heads placed on the chopping block. The human nobles equip the party with weapons and horses, along with a guide and a map that shows the location of the hill giants. The players are informed that the hill giants are led by Nosnra, a sly hill giant chieftain who loves to set up ambushes; there is an unknown force binding together different giant groups. The player characters are informed that they may keep any spoils they find, but must return at once if they determine what "sinister hand" is behind the alliance.

The bulk of the adventure takes place in two locations: the upper level fortress of the hill giants' lair, and the dungeon level beneath it. In the upper level there are halls, barracks and common rooms. These rooms house Chief Nosnra and other hill giants, ogres, and servants. The dungeon level consists of slave quarters, torture chambers, and caverns. These house troglodytes, bugbears, and carrion crawlers. The majority of the treasure can be found by searching the dungeons. The chief's treasure room contains a map of the glacial rift from Glacial Rift of the Frost Giant Jarl, and a magic chain that automatically transports the party there.

=== G2 Glacial Rift of the Frost Giant Jarl ===
This module starts in one of two ways. If the players have finished Steading of the Hill Giant Chief, they have been transported to the glacial rift via the magic chain. They will know that they are searching for some force behind the giant alliance. If the players are starting with Glacial Rift of the Frost Giant Jarl, then they have been hired by nobles to destroy the frost giants. Either way, a safe, hidden cave is easily found for a base of operations.

As in Steading of the Hill Giant Chief, the bulk of this adventure takes place in two locations: an upper area consisting of caves and the rift floor, and a lower area consisting of natural caverns. In the upper area there are ice caves, barracks, and a dome of ice. These are inhabited by yeti, frost giants, ogres, and winter wolves. The dome of ice houses a remorhaz. In the lower area there are caverns that house the servants, serve as a prison, and contain the Jarl Grugnur and emissaries who have come to meet with him. The main inhabitants are frost giants and ogres. The prison contains an attractive storm giantess. There are also polar bears; pets of the jarl. After defeating the jarl, the adventurers have a chance to pull an iron lever which will transport them near to Snurre's hall from Hall of the Fire Giant King.

=== G3 Hall of the Fire Giant King ===
If this module is played as a continuation of the first two modules, the players know that they are searching for the force behind the giants' alliance; otherwise, they have been hired by nobles to destroy the fire giants. This module is twice as long as the previous two: sixteen pages instead of eight. Unlike the two previous modules where the giant's complex consists of two levels, the fire giant hall contains three levels. The giants live in a hot, smoky barren area made of rock; as in the previous module, the party is able to find a safe location for forays against the giants. The leader of the fire giants is King Snurre Iron Belly, and his hall is made of obsidian and natural caverns.

The first (top) level includes the queen's rooms, barracks, and kennels. Creatures encountered here include fire giants, gnolls, and in the kennels, hell hounds. The second level is also made of obsidian rocks and natural caverns. It houses chambers of spiritual interest to the fire giants. There is a hall that houses the dead fire giant kings, and rooms for worship. There are also rooms that contain drow clerics. This is where the party learns that the drow are behind the giant alliance, led by Eclavdra, a high level drow fighter/cleric. The third level consists of natural caverns and contains a great treasure guarded by a red dragon. There are also more fire giants and drow; to exterminate the fire giants, the adventurers must penetrate deep into the active volcano where they live. If the DM wishes, there is a tunnel that leads deep into the earth; to the home of the drow. This allows the adventure to be continued in Descent into the Depths of the Earth.

== Publication history ==
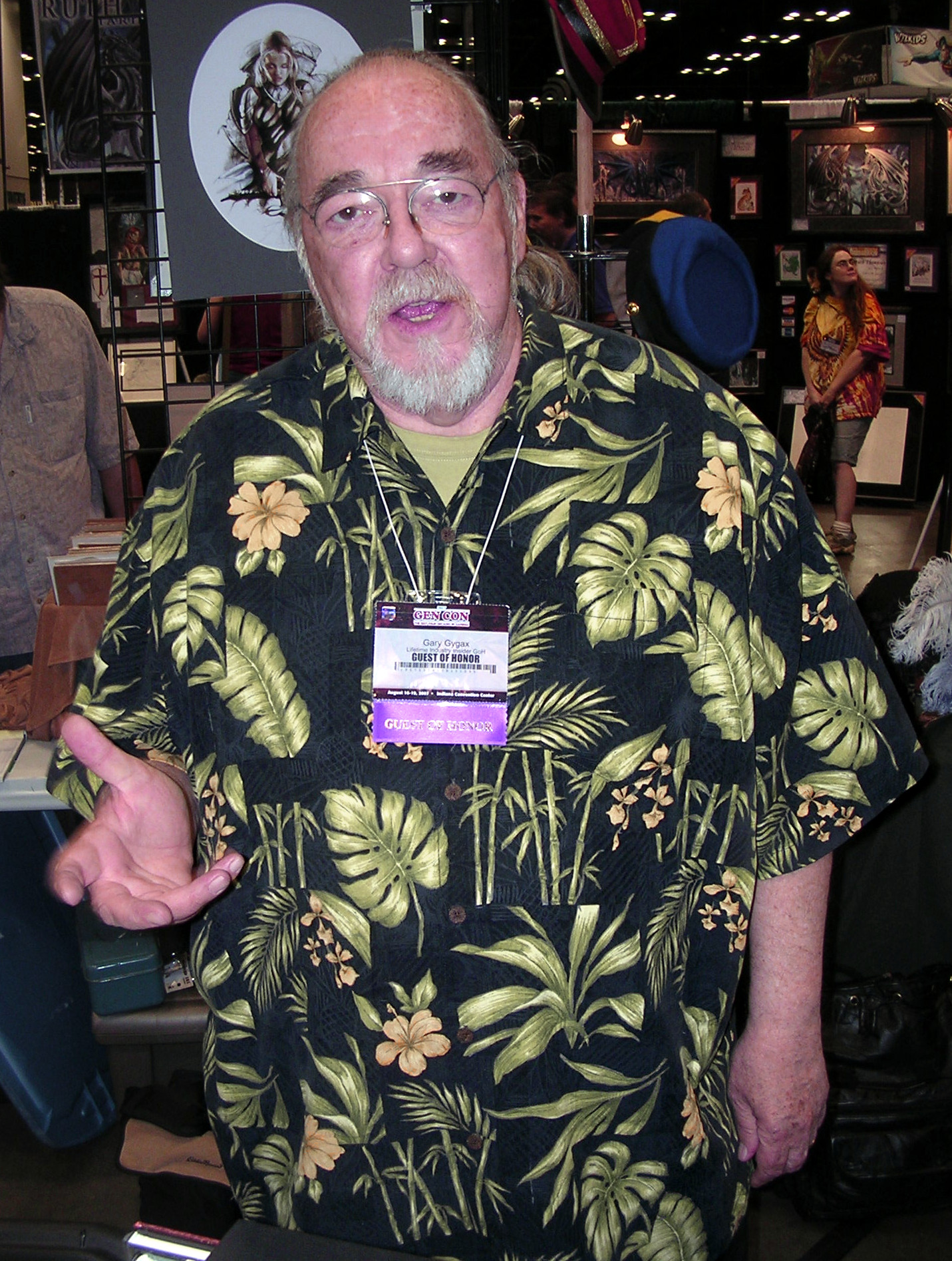
Author Gary Gygax in 2007 at the GenCon game convention

Steading of the Hill Giant Chief, Glacial Rift of the Frost Giant Jarl, and Hall of the Fire Giant King were written by Gary Gygax. In 1978, Steading of the Hill Giant Chief became the first adventure module published by TSR. Gygax wrote them to take a break between writing the original Monster Manual (1977) and Player's Handbook (1978). The covers for Steading and Hall featured drawings by David C. Sutherland III. David A. Trampier drew the Glacial Rift cover. The cover of Against the Giants features a painting by Bill Willingham. Interior art was provided by David A. Trampier, Jeff Dee, David S. LaForce and Erol Otus.

The "Giant" modules were set in the Greyhawk campaign setting, and formed the lead-in to an overall campaign that then continued on an odyssey into the Underdark. These adventures included the "Drow" series of modules, Descent into the Depths of the Earth, Shrine of the Kuo-Toa, and Vault of the Drow. The campaign finally culminated with module Queen of the Demonweb Pits. Steading and Glacial Rift were eight pages long, while Hall was 16 pages in length, and each featured an outer folder. The omnibus collection combination module Against the Giants was 32 pages long, and featured two outer folders. Against the Giants was revised and reprinted in the 128-page supermodule Queen of the Spiders in 1986 in combination with the three "Drow" series modules, and Queen of the Demonweb Pits. Hall of the Fire Giant King marked the first time that Dungeons & Dragons players encountered the drow; game statistics for the drow first appear in the module, although drow are mentioned in the 1977 edition of the Monster Manual. At the time these modules were released, each Dungeons & Dragons module was marked with an alphanumeric code indicating the series to which it belonged. The earlier modules have module codes G1, G2, and G3 respectively, and the combined module's code is G1–3. The "G" in the module code represents the first letter in the word "giant". The Original TSR Product Codes for these 3 modules are 9016, 9017, and 9018 respectively. Released in 1999 to commemorate the 25th anniversary of TSR, Against the Giants: The Liberation of Geoff provided a set of adventuring materials that expanded on the original three modules. 1999 also featured a reprinting of the three modules made available in the Dungeons & Dragons Silver Anniversary Collector's Edition boxed set, with slight modifications to make it distinguishable from the original (for collecting purposes).

The concepts and characters from Against the Giants have made appearances in other media. It was made into a novel of the same name by Ru Emerson for the Greyhawk Classics series. In May 2006, Wizards of the Coast's website released new versions of the maps for the Hill Giant Stronghold. In July 2006, they released new maps for the Fire Giant Hall. In 2004, Wizards of the Coast released a miniature figure of King Snurre from Hall of the Fire Giant King, and in 2007, they released a large Frost Giant Jarl miniature inspired by Glacial Rift of the Frost Giant Jarl. In 2009, Wizards released the boxed super-adventure Revenge of the Giants, intended as an Against the Giants homage, for the game's fourth edition. In 2012, Wizards re-released each module in Dungeon issues 197–200, updated for Fourth Edition by Chris Perkins, including a new fourth adventure, Warrens of the Stone Giant Thane. In 2017, Wizards re-released Against the Giants updated to Fifth Edition rules as part of the Tales from the Yawning Portal collection.

== Reception ==
When combined as a single adventure with the rest of GDQ series, this module was voted the single greatest adventure of all time by Dungeon magazine in 2004, on the 30th anniversary of the Dungeons & Dragons game. According to Dungeon's editors, the drow remain popular villains in part because of their "exciting introduction" in the module. Judge Andy Collins felt the "hack-and-slash" classic was "packed with action" and has run the module more than any other. Judge John Rateliff said that Against the Giants was the module that showed gamers how to create a themed adventure with a mystery and clues that are periodically provided.

Kurt Butterfield reviewed Hall of the Fire Giant King for The Space Gamer, commenting that "the scenario is well thought out and nicely detailed," and includes "some intriguing special instructions given for deviously playing several of the intelligent inhabitants of the dungeon". Butterfield felt that the dungeon was not an easy challenge, especially with the strong and numerous monsters (such as the roughly eighty trolls on one level). In conclusion, he stated, "I advise all DMs who are looking for an exciting, worthwhile adventure for their players to pick this one up. You won't be disappointed."

Don Turnbull of White Dwarf magazine gave the three separate modules comprising the G-series 9/10 overall. Turnbull was impressed that Gygax was able to find time to write them while also creating AD&D's rules, saying "Things are really buzzing at TSR." He felt the presentation of the modules was done well, with easily read maps, although he preferred the black and white maps of the first module to the blue and white maps of the later two. Turnbull found the module's level of detail to be an improvement over previous Dungeons & Dragons scenarios which gave the Dungeon Master (DM) too little information. The review declared the modules "very tough", stating that "the notes suggest nine characters or so, each of ninth level or better and each with two or three relevant magic items."

Turnbull commented on several points that he felt went unnoticed by the module's proofreader. The maps did not contain a scale, which he assumed was 10 feet (3.0 m) per square. It is unclear what triggers one of the traps in the first module. In the second module, an exit from map level one does not have an entrance marked on the second level map. Ultimately he found the errors minor, and easily fixed. Turnbull's most major criticism was that the adventure was aimed at parties of too high a level. Summing up, he said "No DM should be without them, for even if he never gets a chance to run them, they are a source of much excellent design quality."

Jim Bambra reviewed the re-released G module series very positively in issue 35 of White Dwarf magazine, awarding 10 out of 10. Bambra liked the reprinting of the modules, stating that "their printing under one cover has reduced the price at no detriment to the quality." He noted that the original tournament characters are included, although they were not included in the original three separate modules, and that not all of them conform to the rules in the Players Handbook. Two spells were also added, which had been absent from the original modules. Bambra says that he "would suggest not playing these unless you have been playing for a few years, success depends more on player skill than on high character levels and DMing adventures of this level can be a nightmare unless you have had plenty of experience."

Anders Swenson also reviewed dungeon module G-1-2-3, for Chaosium's Different Worlds magazine. Swenson notes that the lower level of the hill giant steading "is a conventional underground dungeon, populated with slaves, guards, and the odd monsters", but that the relatively small space occupied by the revolting slaves seems unrealistic. Swenson also calls the well-constructed dungeon complex of the fire giants "a tough nut for the adventurers" as the giants are in a place constructed for defense; Swenson did feel that the scale of the map was too small. Swenson comments that the reprinting shows the progress TSR has made since these adventures were first published, such as how single products had become longer. Swenson does note that the individual room descriptions were lacking a consistent format, and that important monsters can become lost in the middle of a room's description. Swenson felt that, although the lower levels can degenerate into a random monster mix, the strong points of these adventures outweigh their flaws. Swenson concludes by stating that "Against the Giants is a solid adventure," and that "this would be a worthwhile purchase".

Dungeon Master for Dummies lists Steading of the Hill Giant Chief as one of the ten best classic adventures. Stephen Colbert, who played Dungeons & Dragons as a child, reminisced about these modules: "Those old "Giants" modules, those were tremendous. Those are some of my favorite memories: working my way through fire giant, frost giant, and storm giant castles." Ken Denmead of Wired said the first module is a "pretty easy crash-and-grab," the second contains "some really excellent treasure," but the third is "the end-all, be-all of hack-fests". According to Denmead, the hill giant adventure does not prepare players for the later adventures. Describing the difficulty of battling the fire giants he said, "remember Bambi Versus Godzilla? You're Bambi".

In a retrospective review of Against the Giants in Black Gate, Scott Taylor said "These modules are true pieces of history, the artwork involved stemming from a time when the gaming world was new and truly inventive. The art, expanded from the original 1978 modules into a combined 1981 edition of G-1-2-3 Against the Giants, included the talents of David C. Sutherland III, David A. Trampier, Jeff Dee, David S LaForce, Erol Otus, and Willinghan, their images have capturing my imagination for thirty years."

Francesco Cacciatore for Polygon commented in 2025 that "What I always found interesting about this premise is that it's surprisingly brutal. The party is not tasked to investigate the raids, nor is a diplomatic solution ever presented or remotely possible. The introduction to Steading of the Hill Giant Chief makes it clear that this is a punitive expedition. You have to hit the giants so hard that they will dread even the thought of bothering the territory again. It's as classic D&D as it gets, even in its 5e version: find the monsters, kill them, explore the dungeon, get the treasure. It's not for everyone, of course, but it's interesting to compare it to modern modules to see how the game has changed over the decades."
