= Jim Roslof =

American artist and graphic designer

- Born: James Paul Roslof; November 21, 1946; Chicago, Illinois, U.S.
- Died: March 19, 2011 (aged 64); Elkhorn, Wisconsin, U.S.
- Known for: Fantasy art
- Spouse: Laura Roslof

James Paul Roslof (November 21, 1946 – March 19, 2011) was an American artist who produced cover art and interior illustrations of fantasy role-playing games published by TSR, Inc. during the "golden age" of Dungeons & Dragons. As Art Director at TSR in the early 1980s, he was also responsible for hiring many of the young artists who would go on to careers in the fantasy role-playing industry.

Roslof created the cover for The Keep on the Borderlands, of which more than one million copies were sold.

== Early life and career ==
Jim Roslof was born November 21, 1946, in Chicago, Illinois, to Edward E. and Gertrude (Kibitlewski) Roslof.

Early in his career in the late 1960s, Jim Roslof was a contributor of cover art to the counterculture underground newspaper Chicago Seed.

== At TSR ==
By 1979, Roslof had joined Erol Otus, Bill Willingham, Jeff Dee, Paul Reiche, and Evan Robinson as a staff artist at TSR, Inc. in Lake Geneva, Wisconsin. Over the next year, he provided interior art for:

- Lawrence Schick's White Plume Mountain (1979)
- Gary Gygax's Slave Pits of the Undercity (1980) and Expedition to the Barrier Peaks (1980)
- the hardcover rule book Deities & Demigods, in which he provided illustrations of the entire Greek pantheon (1980)
- various issues of TSR's Dragon magazine, commencing with issue #42 (October 1980)

Roslof also provided the cover art for some of AD&D's greatest adventures:

- Queen of the Demonweb Pits (voted the single greatest adventure of all time, in compilation with the rest of the GDQ series, by Dungeon magazine in 2004)
- The Ghost Tower of Inverness (ranked 30th greatest adventure in the same Dungeon article)
- Secret of the Slavers Stockade
- Keep on the Borderlands (ranked 7th greatest adventure in the same Dungeon article)

B2 Keep on the Borderlands: Cover art by Jim Roslof

The last of these is perhaps Jim's best known work, since the adventure was included in later printings of the Dungeons & Dragons Basic Set, of which over one million copies were sold.

In May 1981, despite the significant amount of artwork needed for an ever-increasing number of company products, TSR manager Kevin Blume fired two of the six staff artists, Paul Reiche and Evan Robinson, on what TSR editor Steve Winter described as "trumped-up charges of insubordination". When Bill Willingham and Jeff Dee complained, they were also fired, leaving only Roslof and Erol Otus as the art department. Roslof was promoted to Art Director, but instead of simply staying with the style of art that had defined TSR products since 1975, Roslof hired a cadre of brilliant artists whose artwork would define TSR to a generation, and who would all go on to successful careers as fantasy artists: Jim Holloway, Larry Elmore, Jeff Easley, Harry Quinn, Keith Parkinson, Tim Truman, and Clyde Caldwell. Parkinson recalled how he was hired: "I drove up one day to see if I could do some freelance work. Jim Roslof, who was the Art Director, hinted that I could join the staff full-time, but I missed the hint. A few days later, I called him about a job, and he had just hired somebody else the day before, but he’d keep me in mind. The next day, he called back, and had an opening."

The artists gathered in what TSR staffers called "the pit". As Scott Taylor recalled, the pit was "a place of creation for all the onsite artists of the growing company. Here countless worlds were born among rubber-band wars and constant deadline pressure. Still, the pit was a place of ultimate creation, a venue where artists worked together for inspiration, guidance, and commiseration in a time before the internet gave purchase to a web of greater connection."

In addition to giving direction to many disparate projects, Roslof also continued to provide artwork for TSR, including illustrations for In the Dungeons of the Slave Lords, Fiend Folio, Descent into the Depths of the Earth, Dwellers of the Forbidden City, and the Dungeoneer's Survival Guide. He also provided artwork for the first issue of Dungeon in 1986, as well as some of the illustrations for TSR's Monster Cards, including original depictions for monsters such as the wemic. In 1996, some of his art was used in the Blood Wars Card Game.

== After TSR ==
After leaving TSR, Roslof moved to Elkhorn, Wisconsin, and continued to produce illustrations for the fantasy industry. In 2005, Goodman Games began to publish a series of D&D adventures called "Dungeon Crawl Classics"; although they used an up-to-date version of rules, they were a deliberate throwback in content and style to TSR's "dungeon crawl" adventures of the 1970s and early 1980s. Several authors from TSR's heyday, including Monte Cook and Dave Arneson, were hired to write adventures, and artists such as Roslof, Jeff Dee, and Jim Holloway provided artwork. Roslof contributed cover art to two of the adventures, Dungeon Crawl Classics #29: The Adventure Begins (2006) and Dungeon Crawl Classics # 43: Curse of the Barrens (2007).

In 2010, Roslof's last illustrations were created for Goodman Games' Dungeon Crawl Classic Role Playing Game rules manual. (The manual, which was published after Roslof's death, is dedicated to him.)

As well as creating fantasy artwork, Roslof was also a professional graphic designer and inventor, with several patent applications for merchandising systems he worked on for DCI Marketing, Inc., the retail marketing subsidiary of IMI plc.

== Personal life ==
Jim Roslof married Laura S. Miller on April 25, 1968, in Aptos, California; they had three children and four grandchildren at the time of his death.

Laura Roslof was also involved in the creation of artwork for Dungeons & Dragons products, including the recalled version of Palace of the Silver Princess. At the time of her husband's death, she ran a stained glass art studio in Elkhorn, Wisconsin.

Roslof died at his home in Elkhorn, Wisconsin, on Saturday March 19, 2011. Laura Roslof died on April 2, 2018.
