= Monster Cards =

- Genre: Role-playing game
- Publisher: TSR
- Publication date: 1981

Monster Cards is an accessory for the Dungeons & Dragons fantasy role-playing game.

== Contents ==
The Monster Cards were sets of twenty 3" by 5" cards intended as a Dungeon Master's aid, with each card having a color illustration of a monster on one side and game statistics for the monster on the other side.

== Publication history ==
The Monster Cards Sets 1 through 4 were designed by the TSR Design Staff, with art by Jeff Dee, Erol Otus, Jim Roslof, Darlene Pekul, and Bill Willingham, and were published by TSR in 1981 as sets of 20 color cards in a small clear plastic box. Additional contributing artists included Jim Holloway, Harry Quinn, Steve Sullivan, and Dave LaForce.

A second group of four sets was tentatively scheduled for release in 1983, according to Harold Johnson, and those sets would have included several monsters from the Fiend Folio book.

== Reviews ==
- Games #32
