= Drow =

Fictional Dungeons & Dragons creature

- An illustration of a drow from Fiend Folio, 1981; Art by Bill Willingham
- First appearance: G3 Hall of the Fire Giant King (1977)
- Based on: Dark elf, Drow

In-universe information
- Type: Humanoid or fey humanoid
- Alignment: Usually Chaotic Evil or Neutral Evil (1st–3rd Editions); Any alignment (4th–5th Editions)

In the Dungeons & Dragons fantasy roleplaying game, drow (/draʊ/ or /droʊ/) or dark elves are a dark-skinned and white-haired subrace of elves connected to the subterranean Underdark. The drow have traditionally been portrayed as generally evil and connected to the evil spider goddess Lolth. However, subsequent editions of Dungeons & Dragons have moved away from this portrayal and preassigned alignment, while later publications have explored drow societies unconnected to Lolth.

== Creative origins ==
The word "drow" originates from the Orcadian and Shetland dialects of Scots, an alternative form of "trow", which are folklorical terms inherited from the Norn language. While interchangeable, drow ultimately derive from Old Norse draugr ("malevolent revenant"; cf. older Norwegian: drau, modern Norwegian: drauv, drøv, drov), with trow deriving from Old Norse troll – see Trow (folklore) § Etymology. Stemming from draugrs and trolls, trow/drow was used to refer to a wide variety of evil sprites. Dungeons & Dragons co-creator Gary Gygax invented everything about the drow in the game except for the basic concept of "dark elves". However, in the Prose Edda, Snorri Sturluson wrote about the black elves: "... the dark elves however live down below the ground. ... [and] are blacker than pitch."

Gygax stated that "Drow are mentioned in Keightley's The Fairy Mythology, as I recall (it might have been The Secret Commonwealth—neither book is before me, and it is not all that important anyway), and as Dark Elves of evil nature, they served as an ideal basis for the creation of a unique new mythos designed especially for the AD&D game." Gygax later stated that he took the term from a listing in the Funk & Wagnall's Unexpurgated Dictionary, and no other source at all. "I wanted a most unusual race as the main power in the Underdark, so used the reference to 'dark elves' from the dictionary to create the Drow." There seems to be no work with this title. However, the following entry can be found in abridged editions of Funk & Wagnall's Standard Dictionary of the English Language, such as The Desk Standard Dictionary of the English Language: "[Scot.] In folk-lore, one of a race of underground elves represented as skillful workers in metal. Compare TROLL. [Variant of TROLL.] trow".

== Publication history ==
=== Advanced Dungeons & Dragons 1st edition ===
The drow were first mentioned in the Dungeons & Dragons game in the 1st Edition 1977 Advanced Dungeons & Dragons Monster Manual under the "Elf" entry, where it is stated that "The 'Black Elves,' or drow, are only legend." No statistics are given for the drow in this book, apart from the statistics for normal elves. The drow are described as purportedly dwelling deep beneath the surface world, in strange subterranean realms. They are said to be evil, "as dark as faeries are bright", and pictured in tales as poor fighters but strong magic-users. From 1978 to 1980, the Greyhawk adventure module series explored the drow in depth, including statblocks for drow and an introduction to their Underdark society.

The first hardcover D&D rulebook featuring statistical information on the drow was the original Fiend Folio (1981). Gygax wrote this entry, listed under "Elf, Drow", according to the book's credits section. The text is a slightly abridged version of the text originally found in modules G3 and D3. Likewise, Lolth's description from module D3 is reprinted in the Fiend Folio under the "Demon" heading.

The drow were first presented as a player character race in Unearthed Arcana (1985), also written by Gygax. Several elven sub-races are described in the book, including gray elves, wood elves, wild elves, and valley elves; the dark elves are described as the most divergent sub-race, and dark elf player characters are considered outcasts from their homeland, either by choice, differing from the standard chaotic evil alignment of the race, or having lost in some family-wide power struggle.

==== Greyhawk module storyline ====
The drow are central to the "GDQ" series. It is hinted in G1 Steading of the Hill Giant Chief (1978) that there is a "secret force, some motivational power behind this unusual banding of different races of giants." G2 The Glacial Rift of the Frost Giant Jarl (1978) mentions this guiding force again in its introduction. The third module in the series, G3 Hall of the Fire Giant King (1978) again mentions the party's need to find out whatever is behind the giants' alliance, and this time mentions the drow specifically by name. In the adventure, the player characters can discover the first hint of drow involvement in the fire giant king's council room, on a scroll which promises "powerful help from the Drow", signed by Eclavdra. Actual drow can be encountered starting on level #2 of the king's hall, beginning with a group of drow priests, and then other drow later.

Having discovered that the drow instigated the alliance between the races of giants and its warfare against mankind, in D1 Descent into the Depths of the Earth (1978) the party follows the fleeing drow into the tunnels leading northwest and deep into the earth, to eliminate the threat they pose. Examining a golden spider pin found on one of the drow priestesses, the party can discover runes in the drow language reading "Lolth, Death Queen Mother". The party continues to pursue the drow in D2 Shrine of the Kuo-Toa (1978). In D3 Vault of the Drow (1978), the adventurers eventually make it to Erelhei-Cinlu, the vast subterranean city of the drow, which is thoroughly described in the module. An extensive overview of the drow power structure is given for the purpose of creating any number of mini-campaigns or adventures taking place inside the drow capital. The characters travel on to the Egg of Lolth, where they must enter the dungeon level and fight the demoness herself. The statistics and information for drow are reprinted from Hall of the Fire Giant King in the back of this module, along with statistics for Lolth herself.

The story concludes in module Q1 Queen of the Demonweb Pits (1980). The astral gate from D3 leads to the Abyssal realm of Lolth, goddess of the drow elves and Demon Queen of Spiders; Lolth is the architect of the sinister plot described in the two previous series of modules. At the very end of the module, the players face a final confrontation with Lolth, an exceptionally difficult challenge. The G1-G3 modules were later published together in 1981 as a single combined module as G1-2-3 Against the Giants, and the entire series of modules in which the drow originally appeared were later published together in Queen of the Spiders (1986).

=== Novels ===
Gary Gygax's 1986 novel for TSR's "Greyhawk Adventures" series, Artifact of Evil, was the first novel to feature the drow prominently. Gygax's subsequent Gord the Rogue novels, published by New Infinities, Inc., continued the story and the involvement of the drow, in the novels Sea of Death (1987), Come Endless Darkness (1988), and Dance of Demons (1988).

R. A. Salvatore's 1988–1990 The Icewind Dale Trilogy featured the unlikely hero Drizzt Do'Urden as one of the protagonists, and the 1990–1991 followup The Dark Elf Trilogy focused on Drizzt and the drow of the Forgotten Realms setting. Salvatore continued the story of Drizzt and the drow in his subsequent series Legacy of the Drow (1992–1996), Paths of Darkness (1998–2001), and The Hunter's Blades Trilogy (2002–2004). Other works continuing the story of the drow in the Forgotten Realms include Elaine Cunningham's Starlight and Shadows series (1995–1996, 2003), the War of the Spider Queen series (2002–2005, various authors), and Lisa Smedman's The Lady Penitent series (2007–2008).

Keith Baker's The Dreaming Dark trilogy (2005–2006) featured the drow of the Eberron campaign setting, particularly those of Xen'drik.

=== Advanced Dungeons & Dragons 2nd edition ===
The drow appear first for this edition in the Monstrous Compendium Volume Two (1989), which expands the information on drow society. Also included in the entry for drow is a description and statistics for the drider. This entry is reprinted with some minor modifications in the Monstrous Manual (1993). The 1992 boxed set Menzoberranzan details the largest city of the drow and offers a detailed description of drow society.

Drow society, religion, history, magic, craftwork, and language for the Forgotten Realms campaign setting is detailed significantly in The Drow of the Underdark (1991), by Ed Greenwood. Greenwood appears in the book's introduction as a narrator, explaining how he came across the information in the book: a discussion with Elminster, and chance encounter with a former apprentice of Elminster—the drow lady, Susprina Arkhenneld—as the two explain the drow of the world to the narrator.

The drow are presented as a player character race for 2nd edition in The Complete Book of Elves (1992). Drow deities Lolth, Kiaransalee, Vhaeraun, and Zinzerena are described in Monster Mythology (1992). The drow are later presented as a playable character race again in Player's Option: Skills & Powers (1995).

=== Dungeons & Dragons 3rd edition ===
The drow appears in the Monster Manual for this edition (2000). The drow of the Forgotten Realms setting appear in the hardcover Forgotten Realms Campaign Setting (2001), and in Races of Faerûn (2003). The drow also appears in the revised Monster Manual for the 3.5 edition (2003).

The Underdark hardcover for the Forgotten Realms setting (2003) features the drow yet again as a player character race, as does the Player's Guide to Faerûn (2004). Lost Empires of Faerûn describes the drow werebat (2005). The drow paragon 3-level prestige class appears in Unearthed Arcana (2004).

In 2004, the new Eberron campaign setting introduced drow in a world where Lolth doesn't exist; various drow societies were then explored in more detail in Secrets of Xen'drik (2006). Additionally, the umbragen for the setting appeared as a player character race in Dragon #330 (April 2005).

The arcane guard drow, the dark sniper drow, the drow priestess, the Lolth's sting, and the Lolth-touched drow ranger appear in Monster Manual IV (2006). The deepwyrm drow is presented as a player character race in Dragon Magic (2006).

The drow are presented as a player character race for the 3.5 edition in Expedition to the Demonweb Pits (2007) and Drow of the Underdark (2007). Drow of the Underdark also features the arcane guard, the drow assassin, the house captain, the house wizard, the drow inquisitor, the favored consort, the drow priestess, the drow slaver, the spider sentinel, the albino drow (szarkai), the szarkai fighters, the szarkai druids, and the drow warrior, along with numerous prestige classes and other monsters related to drow.

==== Open gaming ====
The release of the Open Game License and the System Reference Document's inclusion of the drow race also led to a number of books related to drow being published by companies not affiliated with Wizards of the Coast, such as The Quintessential Drow, The Complete Guide to Drow, Encyclopaedia Arcane: Drow Magic, and Rise of the Drow.

=== Dungeons & Dragons 4th edition ===
The drow appear in the Monster Manual for this edition (2008), including the drow warrior, the drow arachnomancer, the drow blademaster, and the drow priest. The drow appear as a playable race in the Forgotten Realms Player's Guide (2008) and the Essentials rulebook Heroes of the Forgotten Kingdoms (2010).

The drow feature in a pre-written playable module called Demon Queen's Enclave (2008) which takes adventurers from levels 14 through 17 into the Underdark to battle the forces of Orcus and possibly ally with members of the treacherous dark elves and/or their minions. The drow of Xen'drik are also outlined in the 4E Eberron Campaign Guide (2009).

=== Dungeons & Dragons 5th edition ===
The drow appear as a playable elf subrace in the Player's Handbook (2014) for this edition. They also appear in the Monster Manual (2014) for this edition. In the adventure module Out of the Abyss (2015), the players are captured by the drow at the beginning of the adventure. The floodgate to the Abyss is opened by Gromph Baenre, the Archmage of Menzoberranzan, when he tries to harnesses a specific form of power in the Underdark; designer Chris Perkins commented that Gromph is "arguably the most powerful male drow spellcaster in the Forgotten Realms, yet he feels subjugated and betrayed by Lolth and her priestesses". Perkins also said the drow are "iconic D&D villains" with a matriarchal society that "is part of their core identity", adding they are "not looking to fundamentally change that" so there should not be expectations for "drow males to supplant their female superiors any time soon". The drow are also discussed in the Sword Coast Adventurer's Guide (2015) and in the Mordenkainen's Tome of Foes (2018) supplements.

The drow of Xen'drik are again outlined in Eberron: Rising From The Last War (2019). The new Exandria campaign setting added a non-Lolth based society of drow which was introduced in the Explorer's Guide to Wildemount (2020). Per Wizards of the Coast, the drow of these settings are presented as more "morally and culturally complex". On June 26, 2020, Netflix and Hulu removed the "Advanced Dungeons & Dragons" episode of the TV series Community from their platforms due to scenes with Chang playing a dark elf by wearing elf ears and makeup resembling blackface. A statement from Sony Pictures Television said that the studio supported the decision to remove the episode.

Christian Hoffer, for ComicBook.com, highlighted a May 2021 update on Drizzt Do'Urden by Wizards of the Coast and wrote, "it also notes one major change to D&D canon that relates to the drow culture that Drizzt ultimately abandoned. The website points out that while Drizzt grew up in a 'cult of Lolth' [...], there are two other entire cultures of drow who have no ties to Lolth whatsoever. [...] The reveal of the Lorendrow and Aevendrow seem to suggest that Dungeons & Dragons is officially moving past some long-held canon about the drow". Tika Viteri, for Book Riot, commented that Salvatore's Starlight Enclave (2021) "contains a singular shift in the narrative of the story of the drow; Salvatore reveals that drow are not, in fact, the only dark-skinned elves in the Forgotten Realms". In December 2021, Wizards of the Coast released an errata for the Player's Handbook (2014) which updated the lore description of drow to emphasize their environmental connection to the Underdark and decouple them for Lolth. Designer Jeremy Crawford explained that the errata clarifies a description which "confused the culture of Menzoberranzan [...] with drow themselves" and that "drow are united by an ancestral connection to the Underdark, not by worship of Lolth–a god some of them have never heard of".

==== 2024 revision ====
The backward compatible Player's Handbook (2024), as part of the 2024 revision to the 5th Edition ruleset, updates preexisting player options while introducing new content to the game; player races are now described as player species. Drow appear as an Elven Lineage option in this sourcebook. Screen Rant highlighted that mechanically drow are "largely unchanged, save for better spell selection and the removal of sunlight sensitivity". Polygon commented that the changes to the drow reflect a shift in design philosophy by Wizards of the Coast, noting that they were often "portrayed in the past as evil". Polygon highlighted that the 2024 sourcebook describes elves as impacted by their "environment in ways that imbue them with magic and change their appearance" with the drow "being marked by the Underdark without necessarily being aligned with the evil deity Lolth"; this sourcebook "also draws attention to the rainforest-dwelling drow found in the Eberron campaign setting".

== Reception ==
Made famous by R. A. Salvatore's Drizzt novels, these dark elves from the game influenced subsequent works of fantasy. Drow have a gender-based caste system that one author claims says "a great deal about attitudes towards gender roles in the real world".

The drow originally created by Gary Gygax are now "essentially the drow of fantasy fiction today", according to Ed Greenwood, who believes them to be "arguably Gary Gygax's greatest, most influential fantasy creation" after the D&D game itself. Designer James Jacobs considers the drow to be a rare example of a D&D-invented monster becoming mainstream, with even non-gamers recognizing them. Rob Bricken, for Io9, named the drow as the eighth most memorable D&D monster. In the 1990s, products which featured drow produced higher sales. While Paizo Publishing was printing Dragon and Dungeon, covers featuring drow often sold better than other issues in the same year. Academic Steven Holmes noted that drow "remain highly visible in successful media projects".

Holmes highlighted that Gygax created drow as "perfect villains—endpoints on a divide of good and evil". However, Holmes thought R. A. Salvatore's depiction was more complicated than Gygax's and Salvatore's work "in many ways" ended up as the definitive portrayal of the drow. In the Io9 series revisiting older Dungeons & Dragons novels, in his review of Homeland by Salvatore, Bricken says that "its greatest strength is how it explores drow society, which up to that point was best summarized as 'very evil.' Prior to Drizzt, in the vein of orcs, trolls, and primary-colored dragons, the Drow were essentially categorized as more monsters for players to battle and defeat. Their skin was obsidian black, earning them the alternate name of dark elves, and marking them as the evil counterpart to the good and heroic lighter-skinned elves of the surface."

=== As player characters ===
The drow, especially when used as player characters, are surrounded by much controversy, especially after the release of Salvatore's novel, The Crystal Shard. Game designer James Jacobs has said that the drow player characters often spark arguments, with some players refusing to play in a campaign that allows drow PCs. Jacobs says that "even the name" is controversial, having at least two pronunciations. Rob Bricken, for Kotaku, wrote that there "has been one good Drow in the history of D&D, and that's Drizzt Do'Urden, who is one of the Mary Sue-iest characters in all of fiction—and he's been the star of countless novels and is the only reason any D&D player has even been interested in the Drow, of which now there is a terrifying amount of material".

Matthew Beilman, for CBR, highlighted multiple reasons to play as a drow character:

You will love playing a drow if you enjoy making others uncomfortable. In most D&D settings, the drow civilization is evil. [...] This makes them excellent campaign villains but also gives them great potential as antiheroes who lack traditional heroic attributes [...]. Playing a drow can also present an opportunity to play against traditional gender norms. [...] The drow are outsiders, even in settings that do not include Lolth and her corruptive influence. These campaigns might not have evil societies of dark elves, but they still tend to make them into foreigners with strange customs [...]. Playing a misunderstood, feared yet potentially heroic character can be great fun.

In contrast, in his review of Menzoberranzan: City of Intrigue for DieHard GameFan, Alex Lucard wrote, "I'll be honest: I've never understood the appeal of the Drow at all. They just seemed overly angsty and dark for the sake of being dark. I've been bored by the novels where they are the featured race and I've generally avoided them unless someone is making fun of them".

=== Inherent characteristics ===
Some critics have highlighted that the drow are "dark skinned and inherently evil", and are connected to the "racist idea that non-white people are inherently bad". In the academic journal Mythlore, Holmes argued that the depiction of drow was an example of various creators using "negative estrangement" within the narrative "to create a 'more evil' antagonist to serve as a foil for narrative protagonists" and this narrative process "warps" and "strips" stereotypes "of their context in order to use them like ingredients in a recipe for a compelling villain". Holmes also highlighted the inconsistent artistic portrayal over time as "the black skin of the drow is not" consistently used across all products—this meant that when "some saw the drow as a fantastical race of spider-themed elves, others saw them as one of the very few depictions of black-skinned people in Dungeons & Dragons" and the inconsistent "visual representation" then "further compounds the complexity of discussing the relationship of the drow to real world race, given that some players may see the drow as obviously modeled on real world black bodies, and others seeing them as a fantasy race with no realworld analogue".

In 2010, scholar Cory Lowell Grewell found that in the Baldur's Gate video game series, "issues of contemporary race relations are brought to the fore in the player-Character's interactions with the dark-skinned Drow Elves." In the book Dungeons and Dragons and Philosophy (2012), author James Rocha states that the difference between drow and dark elves in the Forgotten Realms setting is rooted in racist stereotypes: "an acceptable lighter skinned dark race side by side with only the most rare exceptions in the darker race, which is thought to be inherently evil, mirrors American history in a very uncomfortable fashion". In a retrospective on the legacy of Dungeons & Dragons, academic Daniel Heath Justice also commented that the "Forgotten Realms was explicitly based on the civilized-versus-savage binary and leaned in hard on racial essentialism in its sadistic black-skinned drow led by vicious matriarchs and their terrible spider goddess, firmly melding anti-Blackness with misogyny, a once-civilized people gone feral under the debased rule of women".

In response to this criticism in 2020, Wizards of the Coast stated: "we present orcs and drow in a new light in two of our most recent books, Eberron: Rising from the Last War and Explorer's Guide to Wildemount. In those books, orcs and drow are just as morally and culturally complex as other peoples. We will continue that approach in future books, portraying all the peoples of D&D in relatable ways and making it clear that they are as free as humans to decide who they are and what they do". Christian Hoffer, for ComicBook.com, highlighted a 2021 Forgotten Realms lore update on the Wizards of the Coast website:

While Drizzt himself is proof that all drow aren't inherently evil, many fans still think that Dungeons & Dragons lore needs major updates when it comes to the drow. The main issue is that the drow (like other 'evil' races) are presented as a large monolithic society dedicated to evil instead of a group with multiple competing interests and beliefs. It's not that some drow, or even a city or country of drow, are seen as evil—it's that Dungeons & Dragons lore has traditionally considered evil drow to be the default. [...] By bringing in two entirely new cultures of drow that have rejected Lolth, it seems that the lore will show that drow are just as complex and multi-faceted as the many other elven subraces in the game.

Holmes commented that "to some extent, the current revisions being applied to race, half races, and the drow specifically reflect longstanding tensions in gaming spaces" and how audience views around "narrative subjects change over time". Holmes thought Wizards of the Coast appears to be aiming for a "middle ground" where "drow are not intrinsically evil" by allowing players to decide if they want to play as an evil drow who adheres to Lolth or play as a "good drow" who deals with "overcoming the racism of the world based on the violence of Lolth-sworn drow. This allows Wizards of the Coast to retain the brand identity of the drow that drove sales of drow-related products for thirty years, while shifting emphasis away from an implied endorsement of naturalized racism".

== Fictional description ==
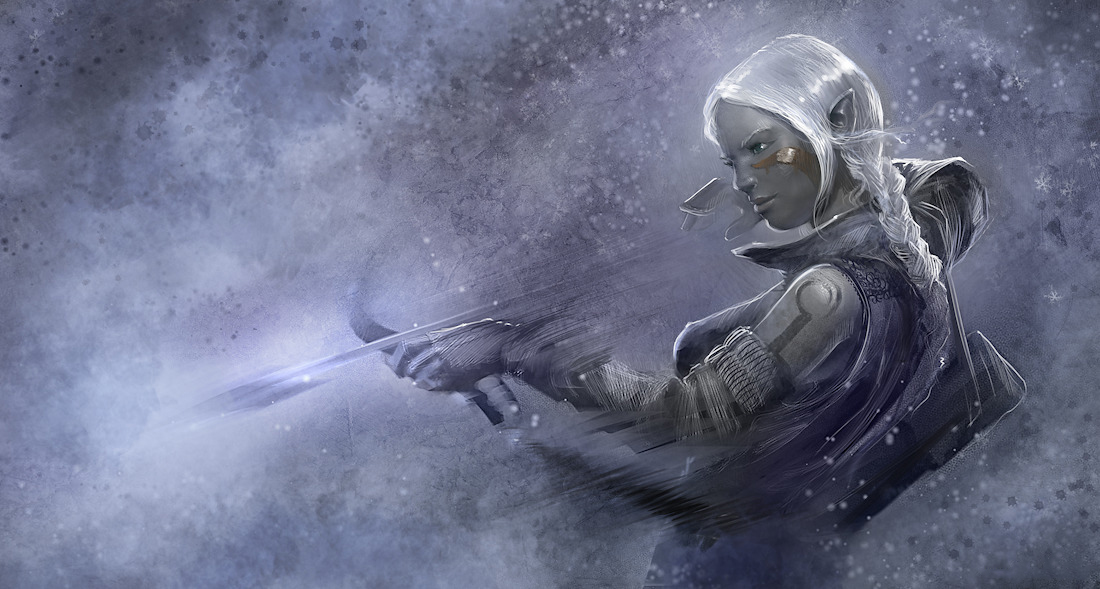
A drow, illustrated by David Revoy

The drow made their first statistical appearance in the Greyhawk adventure module Hall of the Fire Giant King (1978) at the end of the module, and received a lengthy writeup. The history of the drow within the game is revealed; in ages past, the elves were torn by discord and warfare, driving out from their surface lands their selfish and cruel members, who sought safety in the underworld. These creatures, later known as the "dark elvenfolk" or drow, grew strong in the arcane arts over the centuries and content with their gloomy fairyland beneath the earth, though they still bear enmity towards and seek revenge against their distant kin, the elves and faeries who drove them down. They are described as chaotic evil in alignment, and highly intelligent. They are described as black-skinned and pale haired in appearance, around 5-feet tall and slight of build with somewhat sharp features, with large eyes and large pointed ears. Drow are difficult to surprise as they are able to see very well in the dark, have an intuitive sense about their underground world similar to that of dwarves, and can detect hidden or secret doors as easily as other elves do. Drow are highly resistant to magic, while all drow have the ability to use some inherent magical abilities even if they are not strictly spellcasters. The module also reveals that there are rumors of vast caverns housing whole cities of drow which exist somewhere deep beneath the earth, and now that the drow have dwelled in these dark labyrinthe places they dislike daylight and other forms of bright light as it hampers their abilities. They are able to communicate using a silent language composed of hand movements, and when coupled with facial and body expression, movement, and posture, this form of communication is the equal of any spoken language.

The Advanced Dungeons & Dragons game's second edition product Monstrous Compendium Volume Two (1989) describes the world of the drow, where violent conflict is part of everyday life, so much so that most drow encountered are ready for a fight. Their inherent magic use comes from training in magic, which all drow receive. Not long after the creation of the elves, they were torn into rival factions, one evil and one good; after a great civil war, those who followed the path of evil and chaos were driven far from the world's forests and into the bleak, lightless caverns and tunnels of the underworld. Drow society is fragmented into opposing noble houses and merchant families, and they base their rigid class system on the belief that the strongest should rule. Female drow tend to fill many positions of great importance, with priests of the dark goddess Lolth holding a very high place in society. Drow fighters are required to go through rigorous training in their youth, and those who fail are put to death. Drow constantly war with other underground neighbors such as dwarves and deep gnomes (svirfneblin), and keep slaves of all types—including allies who fail to live up to drow expectations.

The Complete Book of Elves (1993) by Colin McComb focuses some of its attention on the drow. The Elfwar is presented, an elven myth in which the elves were one people until the Spider Queen Lolth used the dissent among the elves to gain a foothold; the elves of Lolth took the name Drow to signify their new allegiance, but as they massed to conquer the other elves, Corellon Larethian and his followers drove Lolth and her people deep into the earth, where they chose to remain. The dark elves who became the drow were originally simply elves who held more with the tenets of might than those of justice, and as they quested for power they became corrupted and turned against their fairer brethren. Any elf character of good or neutral alignment, even drow, is allowed into the realm of Arvanaith where elves go upon reaching old age. The book notes that drow player characters have a large number of benefits while suffering few disadvantages, but that "the major disadvantage to being a drow is being a drow." Drow characters are extraordinarily dexterous and intelligent, but have the typically low elf constitution; also, their personalities are described as grating at best, and all other elves hate the drow which affects their reactions to a drow character.

In the 5th Edition Basic Rules, drow are described as a subrace of elves with a connection to Underdark magic. Additionally, it states, "the cult of the god Lolth, Queen of Spiders, has corrupted some of the oldest drow cities, especially in the worlds of Oerth and Toril. Eberron, Krynn, and other realms have escaped the cult's influence—for now. Wherever the cult lurks, drow heroes stand on the front lines in the war against it, seeking to sunder Lolth's web". Mordenkainen's Tome of Foes (2018) retells the story of Corellon and Lolth; the elves who supported Lolth were cast "into darkness. They became a people wholly dedicated to Lolth and her scheming and for many, many centuries were viewed in the multi-verse as a people of evil". However, since all elves are descended from Corellon, the drow have the ability to "break free of Lolth's influence" and turn to "the light within themselves".

== Fictional ecology ==
=== Abilities ===
With the ability to resist magic and powerful darkvision, drow are more powerful than many of Dungeons & Dragons' races. Drow possess natural magical abilities which enables them to summon globes of darkness, outline targets in faerie fire which causes no harm but makes the target brightly visible to everyone who sees them, and create magical balls of light. They can also levitate for short periods of time. They live to extraordinarily long ages if not killed by violence first, over a thousand years in some cases. Their hearing and vision are better than that of a human being and they are difficult to sneak up on because of this. They naturally excel at moving silently. Drow also employ the unusual hand crossbow, firing small, though very lethal, darts.

In Lolth based societies, noble drow males are commonly wizards or fighters. Female nobles are almost always clerics and almost never wizards.

=== Alignment ===
As a race, drow were traditionally portrayed evil. There were unusual exceptions, the most notable being Drizzt Do'Urden, Jarlaxle Baenre, and Liriel Baenre. Originally, drow were chaotic evil in alignment. Beginning with 3rd edition D&D, drow were usually neutral evil. There have been encounters with non-evil drow, but these are distrusted as much as their brethren, due to their reputation. In the Forgotten Realms setting, the Drow followers of Eilistraee were originally the largest group of good Drow, as Eilistraee is the patron goddess of all Drow that have a good alignment.

The 4th Edition Heroes of the Forgotten Kingdoms (2010) does not suggest any typical alignment for drow player characters; however, it highlights the drow that break away from the evil Lolth based societies. The 5th Edition Player's Handbook (2014) described drow as "more often evil than not". In 2021, official errata removed the suggested alignments for playable races, including drow, in all 5th Edition sourcebooks. As of Mordenkainen Presents: Monsters of the Multiverse (2022), creature stat blocks that also have playable races "now state that they can be any alignment".

=== Environment ===
Within the context of many Dungeons & Dragons campaign settings, the drow were forced underground in what is now known as the Underdark after the great war amongst the elves, a vast system of caverns and tunnels spanning much of the continent. The drow live in city-states in the Underdark, becoming one of the most powerful races therein.

The drow are well adapted to seeing in the dark, and they loathe, are terrified of, and are easily blinded by the light of the surface. Some magic weapons, armor, and various other items of the drow disintegrate or lose their magical properties if exposed to the sun.

=== Typical physical characteristics ===
Drow characters are extremely intelligent, charismatic and dexterous, but share surface elves' comparative frailty and slight frames. Females tend to be bigger and stronger than males. Drow are characterized by white or silver hair and obsidian black skin. Their eyes are red (or rarely gray, violet, or yellow) in darkness and can be many different colors in normal light. In 5th Edition, drow typically have "white hair and grayish skin of many hues" along with better darkvision and a sensitivity to sunlight.

Drow have several kinds of innate spell powers and spell resistance. This is balanced by their weakness in daylight. Half-drow are the result of crossbreeding between another race and a drow, and share characteristics of both.

=== Society ===
Lolth based drow society is primarily matriarchal, with priestesses of their evil spider goddess Lolth in the highest seats of power. This society is based upon violence, murder, cunning, and the philosophy that only the strong survive. Hence, most drow plot endlessly to murder or otherwise incapacitate their rivals and enemy drow using deceit and betrayal. Drow, particularly in higher positions, are constantly wary of assassins and the like. One of the quirks of this constant infighting is the relatively short lifespan of the average drow. While being just as long lived as their surface cousins, living as long as a thousand years, elderly drow are rarely encountered. Consequently, they are the only race of elves that matches the fertility of 'lesser' races, such as humans. Their society, as a whole, is seemingly nonviable. The only reason they do not murder themselves to extinction is by the will of Lolth, working primarily through her clergy. Lolth does not tolerate any drow that threaten to bring down her society, and the clergy make certain that perpetrators cease their destructive actions by either threatening or killing them. Matron mothers lead the various noble houses and act as "high priestesses of Lolth". Matthew Beilman, for CBR, highlighted that Lolth based "drow society is a lethal cloak-and-dagger affair—like a constant Game of Thrones but if every character were playing by Lannister/Bolton rules. That is to say, playing dirty and playing to win".

There are exceptions to the rule, of course. Some communities of drow worship other gods (like Vhaeraun or Eilistraee), and thus, their hierarchy changes, reverses the roles of males and females, or (such as in the case of Eilastree) even approaching something like a workable, progressive society. Drow societies can also vary vastly depending on the Dungeons & Dragons campaign setting.

== In various campaign settings ==
Different campaign settings portray drow in various ways.

=== In Eberron ===
Inhabiting the jungles and Underdark in the continental isle of Xen'drik, the drow in Eberron have a much more tribalistic culture than their other Dungeons & Dragons counterparts. They are not an offshoot of the elven race like in many other worlds but rather a separate, if similar, race. Instead of the spider goddess Lolth, most tribes worship a male scorpion deity known as Vulkoor, though exceptions are common. It is believed that Vulkoor is actually one of the forms of the Mockery (a member of the Dark Six). The tribes are often xenophobic, and the social structure varies from tribe to tribe. It is known that the drow mastered elemental binding before gnomes did – including a cultural group of fire-elemental binders called the Sulatar. There is also a subgroup called the umbragen, or shadow elves, who worship the Mockery in the form of a scorpion god and Khyber or the Umbra, the Consuming Shadow, for whom the umbragen are named; the umbragen dwell underground beneath Xen'drik and are noted for producing many warlocks and soulknives.

Drow in Eberron run the gamut from almost feral in nature to being fully civilized and on par with the cultural level of Khorvaire, varying from tribe to tribe.

=== In Exandria ===
The region of Xhorhas, the eastern side of the Wildemount continent in the Exandria setting, is governed by the Kryn Dynasty and ruled by the Bright Queen Leylas Kryn. The Dynasty was founded by drow who escaped to surface after rejecting Lolth for a god of light known as the Luxon. The nation is now home to many creatures others in Wildemount would see as monstrous or evil. Due to the Luxon, the Kryn Dynasty also established a new source of magic called dunamancy which "involves the manipulation of entropy, gravity, and time". Known as dunamancers, people accessing this power draw it "from alternate timelines and unseen realities, subtly affect the flow of time, and even tighten or loosen the grip of gravity". Compared to their neighboring country, the human-run monarchy of the Dwendalian Empire, "the Dynasty is freer, both politically and culturally. They accept anyone and everyone while the Empire is restrictive and nearly inaccessible to outsiders". The Kryn Dynasty was first explored in depth in the second campaign of the web series Critical Role before being added to the Dungeons & Dragons canon in the Explorer's Guide to Wildemount (2020).

Critics have highlighted that this setting breaks from traditional fantasy tropes especially around evil races. James Grebey, for Syfy Wire, highlighted "it's a country of cast-offs and scrappy upstarts who are simply trying to thrive in a world that's prejudiced toward them. Due in no small part to a religion that allows for souls to be reborn in another body, the Kryn society is race-neutral in a way that's rarely seen in fantasy lore. It's borderline progressive, even. Crucially, while there are bad actors among the Kryn, they're not evil solely because of their race". Academics Lisa Horton and David Beard, in the book The Routledge Handbook of Remix Studies and Digital Humanities, viewed the Kryn Dynasty and Xhorhasian culture as "a departure and significant extension of D&D lore surrounding drow" and highlighted that their religion is centered on "the physical manifestation of light itself, the Luxon, and the pursuit off immortality". In contrast, Dan Arndt of The Fandomentals opined that the setting's attempt at subverting the evil drow trope was not "the biggest step up" since he viewed the Wildemount drow as "religious nutjobs with suicidal tendencies".

=== In the Forgotten Realms ===
1991's The Drow of the Underdark, a 128-page sourcebook all about the drow, expanded the drow significantly for the Advanced Dungeons & Dragons second edition version of the Forgotten Realms setting. In the Forgotten Realms, the dark elves were once ancient tribes of Ilythiir and Miyeritar. They were transformed into drow by the Seldarine and were cast down and driven underground by the light-skinned elves because of the Ilythiirian's savagery during the Crown Wars. The drow had fallen under the influence of Araushnee, who was transformed into Lolth and was cast down into the Demonweb Pits along with her son Vhaeraun by the elven god Corellon Larethian because of Lolth's and Vhaeraun's attempt to take control of the elven pantheon (which included Araushnee's seduction of Corellon Larethian). Drow society, being strongly matriarchal, allows the females to hold all positions of power in the government, and to choose and discard mates freely. Social station is the most important thing in drow society, making ascension to greater power a drow's ultimate goal. Drow have a strong affinity for arachnids, as most worship the spider goddess Lolth, and spiders dwell freely among drow communities. The largest drow civilization is the subterranean city of Llurth Dreier. However, Menzoberranzan is featured most prominently in the novels.

Prior to the Spellplague descendants of the Miyeritar, dark elves later succeed in reversing their transformation and are recreated as a distinct dark elf race. According to The Complete Book of Elves, drow are not welcome in Evermeet and are turned away. Drow could also worship Ghaunadaur, Kiaransalee, Selvetarm or Vhaeraun. A special case is Eilistraee, the only drow goddess who is chaotic good instead of chaotic evil; she wants the drow to return to the light. However, all of these alternative deities (except perhaps Ghaunadaur) were killed or forgotten in the last years before the Spellplague, but they managed to return to life and regain their followers, about a century later, during the Sundering.

Amongst the most infamous of drow are the members of House Baenre, while Abeir-Toril is also home to some famous benevolent drow including Drizzt Do'Urden and his deceased father Zaknafein (both of House Do' Urden), Liriel Baenre (formerly of Menzoberranzan's aforementioned House Baenre), and Qilué of the Seven Sisters. The drow Jarlaxle is also well-known, as he is one of the few males in Menzoberranzan to obtain a position of great power. He is the founder and leader of the mercenary band Bregan D'aerthe. These characters are from The Dark Elf Trilogy (1990–1991), a series of books by R. A. Salvatore (except for Liriel Baenre and Qilue). The six drow in the War of the Spider Queen series have also gained some renown since the novels have been published.

In 2021, two new Underdark based drow societies, the Lorendrow and the Aevendrow, were introduced; both of these societies have rejected Lolth and are not evil. The Lolth based society of Menzoberranzan is now referred to as Unadrow. This retcon "suggests that the beliefs and evil practices once seen as common to all drow are specifically related to the 'Unadrow,' the culture of drow who have become corrupted by the evil spider goddess".

=== In Dragonlance ===
In the Dragonlance setting, Drow are not a native race. However, a colony of them exists in a connected pocket dimension called the Valley of Perfect Silence. These arrived by means of a crashed Spelljammer vessel, and are now worshippers of Jiathuli, an evil daughter of Takhisis. "Dark Elves" is a separate term in Dragonlance, referencing elves who have been cast out by the other elves for various crimes, such as worship of the evil deities. Dalamar, a student of Raistlin Majere, is the most notable of Krynn's dark elves. However, over the years Drow have accidentally appeared in a few Dragonlance modules and novels. Similar mistakes have occurred with other standard AD&D races, such as orcs and lycanthropes, which are not part of the Dragonlance setting. Some theories say that these rare Drow may have accidentally been sent there during a plane shifting spell or related magic, a misfire as like as not that is corrected before the respective timelines are tampered with too drastically.

=== In Greyhawk ===
In the world of Greyhawk, the drow were driven underground by their surface-dwelling relatives because of ideological differences. There they eventually adapted to their surroundings, especially by attracting the attention of the goddess Lolth, "Queen of Spiders". The center of drow civilization is the subterranean city Erelhei-Cinlu, and its surrounding Vault, commonly called the Vault of the Drow. Drow rank structure was based much more on personal experience level and proven personal abilities rather than on gender. Males were just as likely to have positions of authority over both males and females, and the tradition of matriarchy, where the highest-ranking member was always a female, was not a special directive of the Demon Queen Lolth. The vast majority of Drow Elves both male and female in the original campaign setting of Greyhawk have no authority or ranking at all and live an idle and degenerate life in the great city of the Drow.

Known drow of Greyhawk include Clannair Blackshadow, Derken Gale, Jawal Severnain, and Landis Bree of Greyhawk City; Eclavdra of House Eilserv; and Edralve of the Slave Lords. In the drow city Erelhei-Cinlu, player characters may freely enter the city and spend time there, unless they attempt to organize any escaped slave groups for open warfare against the drow; the threat of a slave uprising will bring the chaotic drow into full cooperation.

Some drow worship a nameless Elder Elemental God (said to have ties to Tharizdun) instead of Lolth. The module Vault of the Drow showcases that the House of Eilservs, led by Eclavdra in Erelhei-Cinlu, turned from worship of Lolth to the Elder Elemental God when the city's other noble houses allied against them after proclaiming that their mistress should be the Queen of All Drow. Eilservs attempted to establish a power base through a puppet kingdom in the surface world dedicated to the worship of their new deity, so that their demands of supreme power in the Vault can no longer be denied, but this scheme was ruined.

=== In other campaign settings ===
- In the Mystara / "Known World" setting, shadow elves are a race of subterranean elves who have been mutated via magic. Aside from living underground, they have nothing in common with Drow and are not known as Dark elves.
- In Mongoose Publishing's Drow War trilogy, the drow are recast as lawful evil villains and likened to the Nazis. The author of the series has stated that this was a deliberate reaction to the prevalence of renegade, non-evil drow characters.
- Drow appear as a playable race in Urban Arcana, which is a d20 Modern setting based on Dungeons & Dragons. They are shown as very fashionable, often setting new trends. The symbol for most drow is a spider, and they often take the mage or acolyte classes.
- A supplement book about the drow was produced by Green Ronin Publishing called Plot & Poison: A Guidebook to Drow in 2002 and is based on the d20 System. It introduces several drow subtypes including aquatic drow and vupdrax (or winged drow) plus fleshes out drow life, such as how they treat slaves of the various fantasy types like elves and humans. Wizards of the Coast, seeing the heavy sales of the GRP supplement, released their own supplement book called Drow of the Underdark in May 2007.
- Drow in the Pathfinder Chronicles Campaign Setting used to be elves but stayed on Golarion when the other elves left the world. Over time, the remaining elves turned into drow by powerful magic, and at this time any elf who is evil enough can spontaneously turn into a drow. The existence of drow in Golarion is virtually unknown to non-elves. Drow are also the main antagonists in the Second Darkness Adventure Path and the Rise of the Drow Trilogy. In 2023, Paizo announced that drow would be retconned out of Golarion's lore and replaced by serpentfolk as the publisher transitions away from Wizard of the Coast's Open Game License.

== Drow pantheon ==
=== Lolth ===
Lolth
- Dungeons & Dragons character
- First appearance: Descent into the Depths of the Earth (1978)
- Created by: Gary Gygax

In-universe information
- Aliases: (Forgotten Realms only): Araushnee, Lloth (Menzoberranzan and Uluitur), Megwandir, Moander, Zinzerena
- Race: Deity
- Gender: Female
- Title(s): The Spider Queen, Queen of Spiders, Demon Queen of Spiders, Demon Queen of the Abyss, Spider Bitch, Queen of the Demonweb Pits, Weaver of Chaos, the Hunted, the Mother of Lusts, Dark Mother of All Drow, Lady of Spiders
- Alignment: Chaotic Evil
- Home: Demonweb Pits
- Power level: Intermediate/Greater
- Portfolio: Spiders, evil, darkness, chaos, assassins, drow
- Domains: Chaos, Darkness, Drow, Evil, Destruction, Spider, Trickery

Lolth is a fictional goddess in Dungeons & Dragons. Lolth (Lloth in the Drow language), the Demon Queen of Spiders, is the chief goddess of the Drow. She is also known as the Spider Queen and the Queen of the Demonweb Pits; her realm in the Abyss is referred to as the Demonweb Pits. Lolth usually appears in two forms: drow and arachnid. In drow form, the Spider Queen appears as an "exquisitely beautiful" female dark elf, sometimes covered in clinging spiders. In her arachnid form, Lolth takes the appearance of a giant black widow spider with the head of a female drow or human peering from between the eight spider-eyes. Sometimes, the two foremost pair of her spider-legs are actually humanoid arms. In third edition, her arachnid form has taken more of a drider-like appearance, due to the events of the War of the Spider Queen novel series.

==== Conception and creation ====
Lolth was created by Gary Gygax for the World of Greyhawk campaign setting, so that this world has long been associated with the deity. Later she appeared in the Forgotten Realms setting, and in the 3rd edition became a member of the default pantheon of D&D gods. In those various settings, the drow pantheon of gods consists of the leader Lolth, as well as Kiaransalee, Vhaeraun, and Zinzerena and also the one good goddess Eilistraee. Other drow gods may be present in different campaign settings.

According to the Forgotten Realms storyline, Lolth began as an intermediary goddess abiding in the sixty-sixth layer of the Abyss, the Demonweb Pits. Through the events that transpired in War of the Spider Queen series, she transformed herself into a greater goddess as depicted in 4th Edition, the Demonweb Pits becoming its own plane.

==== Publication history ====
Lolth was first mentioned in the modules Descent into the Depths of the Earth (1978) and more fully described in Vault of the Drow (1978), and was the main antagonist of the module Queen of the Demonweb Pits (1980). These modules were later reprinted as part of the Queen of the Spiders collection in 1986. Lolth's role as a deity was first explored in Deities & Demigods (1980). Her game statistics were reprinted in the Fiend Folio (1981).

Lolth's role in the Forgotten Realms campaign setting was first detailed in Ed Greenwood's second edition AD&D sourcebook, Drow of the Underdark (1991). Lolth was detailed as a deity in the book Monster Mythology (1992), including details about her priesthood. Her role in the cosmology of the Planescape campaign setting was described in On Hallowed Ground (1996). Lolth received a very detailed description of her role in the Forgotten Realms in Demihuman Deities (1998).

Lolth is detailed in Defenders of the Faith (2000), and Deities & Demigods (2002), and her role in the Forgotten Realms is revisited in Faiths and Pantheons (2002). Lolth's priesthood is detailed for this edition in Complete Divine (2004), and her role in the Abyss is detailed in the Fiendish Codex I: Hordes of the Abyss (2006). Lolth and the Drow are further detailed in both Drow of the Underdark (2007), and the adventure Expedition to the Demonweb Pits (2007).

Lolth appears as one of the evil deities described in the Dungeon Master's Guide (2008) for the 4th Edition of Dungeons & Dragons. The story of her dissent from and war against Corellon and Sehanine is fleshed out in the supplements Underdark and The Plane Above: Secrets of the Astral Sea. A slightly different (and arguably more powerful) version of Lolth is presented in the Forgotten Realms Campaign Guide. Lolth in the Forgotten Realms has a different appearance, dogma and personality than the core Lolth. Wizards of the Coast's D&D Compendium and D&D Character Builder record the core Lolth and the Realms Lolth as separate entities. Lolth (Demon Queen of Spiders) appears in the 4th Edition's Monster Manual 3 (2010). She is the mascot for this volume, which includes statistics for Lolth in both drow and spider form.

In 2021, Lolth was featured on two cards as a "legendary planeswalker" in the Adventures in the Forgotten Realms line from the Magic: The Gathering collectible card game. Lolth was featured on the alternative cover edition of the 2024 Revised 5th Edition Dungeon Master's Guide with art by Olena Richards.

==== Reception ====
Dragon #359 (September 2007), the final print issue of the magazine, described Lolth as one of the 20 most memorable villains of the Dungeons & Dragons game. Witwer et al., in the book Dungeons & Dragons Art & Arcana, considered Lolth one of the "iconic D&D characters", present throughout the decades of the game.

Lolth was #10 on Screen Rant's 2018 "Dungeons & Dragons: The 15 Most Powerful Villains, Ranked" list—the article states "The War of the Spider Queen series would show Lolth's transformation into a greater goddess, making her one of the most powerful beings in the Dungeons & Dragons multiverse. [...] Lolth can appear in the form of a monstrous spider, which many fans have mocked, due to the fact that it only has sixty-six hit points. You likely won't get a chance to get close enough to harm Lolth, due to the fact that you are battling her in her home dimension, which is filled with an army of demonic spiders. Lolth can also transform into the form of a high-level magic-user/cleric, which gives her access to a wide-range of powerful spells. This is to say nothing of her psionic abilities, though these are given to her at the discretion of the dungeon master". Lolth was #8 on CBR's 2020 "Dungeons & Dragons: 10 Endgame Bosses You Need To Use In Your Next Campaign" list—the article states "the DMs can even get rather creative with the stage; since Lolth is a creature of the Underdark, the fight leading up to her and the boss herself can take place in a dark and nightmarish cave that requires some spelunking and vertical maneuvers. Bonus points if the fight happens in a web network suspended midair with an abyssal drop".

=== Eilistraee ===
Eilistraee
- Forgotten Realms character
- First appearance: The Drow of the Underdark (1991)
- Created by: Ed Greenwood

In-universe information
- Race: Deity
- Gender: Female
- Title(s): The Dark Maiden, The Dark Dancer, Lady of the Dance, Lady Silverhair, Moon Maiden, Dancing Goddess, Dark Lady, The Masked Lady( (Note: After the 1489 DR, Eilistraee no longer holds this last title, which she earned when she took over her brother Vhaeraun's portfolio. As described in the history section, both of them are alive, but separate entities once again))
- Alignment: Chaotic Good
- Home: Arvandor
- Power level: Lesser
- Portfolio: Song, beauty, dance, swordwork, hunting, moonlight
- Superior: Lolth

Eilistraee, also referred to as "The Dark Maiden", is a fictional deity in the Forgotten Realms campaign setting. Eilistraee's name is pronounced as EEL-iss-TRAY-yee, eel-ISS-tray-ee, eel-iss-tray-yee or eil-iss-tray-yee. In the game world, she is a goddess in the drow pantheon, and her portfolios are song, dance, swordwork, hunting, moonlight and beauty.

==== Creative origins and Forgotten Realms storylines ====
Eilistraee was first created for the original home campaign run by Ed Greenwood himself, appearing by manifestation, dream vision, and in person. At the behest of editor Newton Ewell, who wanted a deity for good drow in the game, Greenwood used the opportunity to make the Dark Dancer official and added Eilistraee to The Drow of the Underdark (1991) and thus to the official Forgotten Realms. He meant for Eilistraee to take the role of a nurturing and protecting mother-goddess for the whole drow race. Greenwood denies a connection to Artemis/Diana of Greek and Roman mythology.

In the Forgotten Realms campaign setting, Eilistraee is the daughter of Corellon Larethian and of Araushnee (who later took the name Lolth after being punished by Corellon), a free-spirited and kind-hearted goddess, with a fiery streak in her personality. When, during her youth, a host of evil deities assaulted Arvandor (her home), Araushnee's treachery almost made her slay her own father. Even though she was cleared from any guilt, Eilistraee chose to share her mother's exile, because she knew that the drow would need her light and help in the dark times to come. Since after the descent of the drow, in the present era of the setting, Eilistraee tries her best to be a mother goddess to her people and bring them the hope of a new life: she fights to lead them back to the lands of light, helping them to flourish and prosper in harmony with all other races, free from Lolth's tyranny. Hers is an uphill battle, however, as her power is little and she is opposed by all the gods of the Dark Seldarine. But, despite having to overcome many hardships and setbacks, Eilistraee has never given up fighting for her people. In the 1370s DR, her conflict with her mother over the souls of the drow race ultimately led to Eilistraee's defeat and disappearance. It lasted for about a century, until The Sundering (c. 1480s DR), when Eilistraee returned to life and to her followers. (Note: As said here, in answer to this question, only the following lines of text in the reference No. 11 are to be considered official: "After Flamerule 1489, Vhaeraun and Eilistraee are separate deities with the same powers and portfolios they had before 1375, but a new understanding, respect, and even friendship for each other. Some of their followers still war with each other, but the two deities do not. Thus far, Eilistraee’s teachings after the Sundering are the same as before the Sundering")

==== Publication history ====
Eilistraee was first detailed in The Drow of the Underdark (1991). Her role in the cosmology of the Planescape campaign setting was described in On Hallowed Ground (1996). Eilistraee received a very detailed description in Demihuman Deities (1998). She is described as one of the good deities that celestials can serve in the supplement Warriors of Heaven (1999). Eilistraee then appears in 3rd edition in the Forgotten Realms Campaign Setting book (2001), and was further described in Faiths and Pantheons (2002).

Eilistraee is one of the Forgotten Realms deities that made a reappearance during the event known as The Sundering which transitioned Dungeons & Dragons from 4th Edition to 5th Edition. She is mentioned as such in the novels Spellstorm (2015) and Death Masks (2016) by Greenwood. In the 5th Edition sourcebook Sword Coast Adventurer's Guide (2015), Eilistraee receives a brief description, and is listed as one of the deities active in the post-Sundering era of the Forgotten Realms. Mordenkainen's Tome of Foes (2018) includes a full entry for Eilistraee.

==== Reception ====
Scholar Michael Blume posited that the inclusion of Eilistraee as a benign counterpart to her evil mother Lolth in D&Ds mythology of the elves contributed to bringing a complexity to the fantasy drow, beyond racist and antifeminist stereotypes perceived in the writings of J.R.R. Tolkien and Gary Gygax. Rob Bricken of Kotaku identified Eilistraee as one of "The 13 Strangest Deities in Dungeons & Dragons", commenting: "To know Eilistraee, you have to know the Drow. The Drow are a race of evil elves who live underground and basically spend all their days murdering each other because they're so damn evil. There has been one good Drow in the history of D&D, and that's Drizzt Do'Urden, who is one of the Mary Sue-iest characters in all of fiction—and he's been the star of countless novels and is the only reason any D&D player has even been interested in the Drow, of which now there is a terrifying amount of material. Anyways, Eilistraee is apparently the goddess of good Drow, which means she has one worshipper on the planet. This is nonsense."

=== Other deities ===
The drow deities Ghaunadaur, Kiaransalee, Selvetarm, Vhaeraun, and Zinzerena were primarily introduced during the Advanced Dungeons & Dragons 2nd Edition era. Ghaunadaur first appeared in The Drow of the Underdark (1991) and was expanded upon in Demihuman Deities (1998) and 3rd Edition's Faiths and Pantheons (2002). Kiaransalee debuted in Monster Mythology (1992), was further detailed in On Hallowed Ground (1996), Demihuman Deities (1998), and Faiths and Pantheons (2002); she also appears in module City of the Spider Queen (2002) and Forgotten Realms novels. Selvetarm's lore was expanded in Faiths and Pantheons (2002) and novels such as Lisa Smedman's Sacrifice of the Widow (2007). Vhaeraun was also introduced in Monster Mythology (1992) and was featured in On Hallowed Ground (1996), Demihuman Deities (1998), and Faiths and Pantheons (2002), with additional narrative developments in Forgotten Realms novels. Zinzerena appeared in Monster Mythology (1992) and On Hallowed Ground (1996), but later lore relegated her to a minor or deceased status under Lolth's dominance. As part of the world restructuring of the Forgotten Realms in preparation for D&D 4th Edition, many deities were removed from the game to simplify the pantheons.

Ghaunadaur, also known as That Which Lurks and The Elder Eye, is a chaotic god of oozes, rebels, and outcasts, known for his capricious nature and ancient origins from primordial slimes. Kiaransalee, the vengeful Lady of the Dead, is a goddess of undead and retribution who rose from mortal royalty to godhood, only to later fall from power through epic magic. Selvetarm, the Spider that Waits, embodies mindless battle and bloodlust, having been corrupted and enslaved by Lolth after a tragic manipulation. Vhaeraun, the Masked Lord, champions drow males, surface raiding, and rebellion against Lolth's matriarchy; it is believed he was killed by Eilistraee during a failed assassination attempt. Zinzerena, a chaotic goddess of assassins and trickery, ascended through theft of divine power and embodies stealth, betrayal, and ruthless survival, though her influence waned under Lolth's supremacy.

== Related creatures ==
Like elves, drow have other creatures associated with them either by environment or by blood. The drider, a drow transformed into a half-drow half-spider creature as a punishment, is one of the most often cited examples.

=== Drider ===
Only high-level priestesses in good standing with Lolth are able to initiate the transformation of a dark elf into a drider. This transformation is very painful, and lasts at least 12 hours. Driders develop a poisonous bite. Their digestion changes and they must drink blood of living creatures for sustenance. Driders still maintain the spells and special abilities they had developed as a drow. There can exist any character class of drider. They retain intelligence and memories. This usually makes them bitter, spiteful creatures. Some hunt for magic powerful enough to undo the transformation.

In previous editions, driders appear sexless due to bloating, but able to magically reproduce. In Dungeons & Dragons edition 3.5, driders seem to retain their gender and characteristics after the transformation, but fertility is debatable.

Driders play many roles in drow society. The dark elves both fear and are revolted by driders. After transformation, they are usually pushed to the wild area around a drow city. Driders are usually found in company with tiny, huge and giant spiders. Driders speak Common, Elvish, and Undercommon. In the first and second editions of the game, Driders spoke Drow. Driders are almost always Chaotic Evil.

In the Fourth Edition of Dungeons & Dragons, becoming a drider is actually considered holy and a blessing from Lolth.

=== Draegloths ===
Draegloths are half-demon, half drow monstrosities. Found in any campaign setting, they are particularly numerous in the Forgotten Realms. They are created by the unholy union between an ascending high priestess of the drow goddess Lolth and a glabrezu.

Draegloths are about ten feet tall and have four arms, the upper pair being much larger than the lower. They have large claws on the upper arms and they use them for hand-to-hand combat, for they usually prefer the feeling of tearing flesh and sinew under their claws and fangs. Their face is stretched so it resembles that of a dog. Their flesh is as dark as a drow's, and they are covered in a fine coat of fur; they also have a white mane. They are sacred creatures to the Lolthites and are usually treated with respect.

Triel Baenre of Menzoberranzan, in the Forgotten Realms, had a draegloth son, Jeggred.

V3.5 statistics for the draegloth can be found in Drow of the Underdark.

=== Chitines and choldriths ===
"The chitine and the choldrith are part-elf, part-spider abominations created by magic as servitors of the spider goddess Lolth" appearing in the Forgotten Realms setting. Chitine resembles a sickly, white, four-foot tall humanoid with vaguely spider-like features. They are depicted with wavy hair and sly faces with a set of spider's fangs protruding from their mouths. Chitines also have four arms which feature an additional joint (compared to a human), giving them great flexibility and dexterity. They were created inadvertently by the drow as a result of failed experiments on normal humanoids.

Chitines typically hate their former masters, the drow, but keep worshipping Lolth. The role of priests in their society is taken up by a closely related but completely separate race, the choldriths. Chitines strongly live up to their spider heritage; in their underground cities and villages, they build with webs in the same way that humans build with wood and stone. They build everything out of it, homes, traps, clothing, weapons, and more.

== See also ==
- Dark elf (disambiguation)
