= Expedition to Undermountain =

Dungeons & Dragons adventure module

- Rules required: Dungeons & Dragons version 3.5
- Character levels: 01–10
- Campaign setting: Forgotten Realms
- Authors: Eric L. Boyd, Ed Greenwood, Christopher Lindsay, Sean K. Reynolds
- First published: 2007
- ISBN: 978-0-7869-4157-5

Expedition to Undermountain is a generic setting adventure module for the Dungeons & Dragons (D&D) roleplaying game published by Wizards of the Coast in 2007. The book contains a 221-page adventure campaign setting designed for 1st- to 10th-level player characters using the D&D version 3.5 rule set.

== Plot summary ==
Expedition to Undermountain presents an adventure campaign designed to cover a number of levels of play. Undermountain, as it is presented here, is a huge adventuring area for any D&D campaign, containing nine main levels and more than twenty sublevels, connecting to more extensive dungeons and caverns, and ultimately to the Underdark. The book treats Undermountain as an unexplored underground region, and provides plots, power groups, and lore to enable a Dungeon Master to detail any corner of Undermountain to create a long-term adventure setting. Encounters are presented in the book, which are designed to take a party of player characters from 1st level to 10th level. With an appendix it also describes a set of new creatures, such as the Eyeball Swarm, and new items, such as the Crown Adamant.

== Publication history ==
The book was published in 2007, and was written by Eric L. Boyd, Ed Greenwood, Christopher Lindsay, and Sean K. Reynolds, with cover art by Michael Komarck and interior art by Thomas M. Baxa, Steven Belledin, Ed Cox, Ralph Horsley, Ron Spencer, and Beth Trott.
