= Underdark =

Fictional location in Dungeons & Dragons

The Underdark is a fictional setting which has appeared in Dungeons & Dragons role-playing campaigns and Dungeons & Dragons-based fiction books, including the Legend of Drizzt series by R. A. Salvatore. It is described as a vast subterranean network of interconnected caverns and tunnels, stretching beneath entire continents and forming an underworld for surface settings. Polygon called it "one of D&D's most well-known realms".

== Use in campaign settings ==
The Underdark featured prominently in the campaign settings World of Greyhawk and the Forgotten Realms. The concept of a dungeon that spanned a planet was first introduced by Gary Gygax in his D-series of game modules and at the end of the G-series. The Underdark was described in detail in the 1986 manual Dungeoneer's Survival Guide, by Doug Niles. It was also part of the Eberron campaign setting, in which it was called Khyber and was home to evil beings driven deep into the caverns at the end of the age of demons. Wolfgang Baur, who previously wrote the Underdark adventure Kingdom of the Ghouls for the Greyhawk setting, also introduced the Underdark in Empire of the Ghouls to the third-party Midgard setting from Kobold Press.

A review for Pyramid refers to the Underdark as "one of the most well known facets of the Forgotten Realms". Much of the literary attention for this deep underworld stemmed from the sourcebooks and accessories for the Forgotten Realms setting, including R.A. Salvatore's novels about the fictional character Drizzt Do'Urden.

The Underdark was also the setting for the expansion pack to the computer game Neverwinter Nights called Hordes of the Underdark, which featured the port city of Lith My'athar, and the mysterious Seer.

== Features ==
The Underdark is a subterranean realm of enormous size inhabited by many different types of creatures such as drow, mind flayers, and aboleths. It extends far beyond the dungeons created by surface dwellers, and consists of caverns, tunnels and large complexes.

=== Environment ===
The fictional Underdark's physical characteristics are based upon conditions in real-world caverns deep underground, except at immense size. Within the context of a game, the Underdark is extremely dangerous, especially to non-native characters and creatures. There are also the usual dangers associated with caverns: claustrophobia, poor air circulation, floor/ceiling collapses and getting lost.

There is no light except for occasional patches of phosphorescent fungus; most Underdark inhabitants either have highly developed senses other than sight or have developed darkvision. (Note: This was infravision before the 3rd edition of the game rules.) Food can be extremely difficult to find, and much of the natural vegetation is poisonous. In addition, potable water is hard to locate.

In the Forgotten Realms setting, the Underdark is permeated with a magical energy the drow call faerzress, which is used as a source of energy by the native plant life and which interferes with scrying and teleportation spells.

=== Araumycos ===
In the Forgotten Realms setting, Araumycos (Dwarvish, literally meaning "Great Fungus") is an enormous fungal growth in the Upper Underdark under the continent of Faerûn. It is a single organism living beneath the High Forest between one and three miles under the surface, immune to magic and resistant to psionic energy. Araumycos will sometimes attack intruders with poison, spores, and manifestations that resemble oozes and slimes.

Araumycos houses many other fungal creatures. Travel within it is difficult since many passages and caves are blocked by it and damage regenerates quickly.

=== Inhabitants ===
The Underdark is home to many predators, races and fantasy monsters, most of which are hostile. These include:

- Aboleths
- Beholders
- Drow (dark elves)
- Duergar (gray dwarves)
- Dwarves
- Fomorian
- Illithids (Mind Flayers)
- Hook horrors
- Kuo-toa
- Myconids (Fungus-men)
- Pech
- Svirfneblin (Deep Gnomes)
- Troglodyte

There is no unified underground government since each individual city-state has a different form of rule. The Underdark economy deals primarily in armor, exotic goods, magic, slaves, timber and weapons. The ethical code of many indigenous races tends toward evil or neutral.

In the Forgotten Realms campaign setting, R.A. Salvatore created the drow Underdark city Menzoberranzan.

== Media ==
=== Source books ===
- Boyd, Eric L. (November 1999). Drizzt Do'Urden's Guide to the Underdark. TSR, Inc. ISBN 0-7869-1509-9.
- Greenwood, Ed (July 1991). The Drow of the Underdark. TSR, Inc. ISBN 1-56076-132-6.
- Niles, Douglas (1986). Dungeoneer's Survival Guide. TSR, Inc. ISBN 0-88038-272-4.
- Wyatt, James (2007). Lost Caverns of The Underdark: Dungeon Tiles. Wizards of the Coast. ISBN 978-0-7869-4709-6.
- Greenwood, Ed; Niles, Douglas; Salvatore, R. A. (December 1992). Menzoberranzan. TSR, Inc. ISBN 1-56076-460-0.
- James, Brian R.; Menge, Eric (August 2012). Menzoberranzan: City of Intrigue. Wizards of the Coast. ISBN 9780786960361.
- Cordell, Bruce R.; Kestrel, Gwendolyn F. M.; Quick, Jeff (2003). Underdark. Wizards of the Coast. ISBN 0-7869-3053-5.
- Heinsoo, Rob; Collins, Andy (2010). Underdark. D&D 4th edition supplement. Wizards of the Coast. ISBN 978-0-7869-5387-5.

=== Game modules & adventures ===
- Wyatt, James (2002). City of the Spider Queen. Wizards of the Coast. ISBN 0-7869-2874-3.
- Williams, Skip (2001). Deep Horizon. Wizards of the Coast. ISBN 0-7869-1855-1.
- Noonan, David; Sims, Chris (2008). Demon Queen's Enclave. Wizards of the Coast. ISBN 978-0-7869-4977-9.
- Gygax, Gary (1978). Descent into the Depths of the Earth (9059 ed.). TSR, Inc. ISBN 0-935696-60-1.
- Green, Richard; Baur, Wolfgang (2020). Empire of the Ghouls. Kobold Press. ISBN 978-1-936781-97-3.
- Boyd, Eric L.; Greenwood, Ed; Lindsay, Christopher; Reynolds, Sean K. (2007). Expedition to Undermountain. Wizards of the Coast. ISBN 978-0-7869-4157-5.
- Baur, Wolfgang (1998). "Kingdom of the Ghouls". Dungeon. No. 70. TSR, Inc.
- Sargent, Carl (1995). Night Below: An Underdark Campaign. TSR, Inc. ISBN 0-7869-0179-9.
- Perkins, Christopher; Lee, Adam; Whitters, Richard (2015). Out of the Abyss. Wizards of the Coast. ISBN 978-0-7869-6581-6.
- Sutherland III, David C; Gygax, Gary (1980). Queen of the Demonweb Pits. TSR, Inc. ISBN 0-394-51541-2.
- Cordell, Bruce R.; Marmell, Ari (2007). The Sinister Spire. Wizards of the Coast. ISBN 978-0-7869-4357-9.
- Gygax, Gary (1978). Vault of the Drow (9021 ed.). TSR, Inc. ISBN 0-935696-07-5.

=== Video games ===
Parts of Baldur's Gate II: Shadows of Amn and Baldur's Gate 3 take place in the Underdark, and Icewind Dale II featured journeys through the Underdark. An expansion pack based on the Underdark setting was released for the Neverwinter Nights game series, titled Neverwinter Nights: Hordes of the Underdark. The tilesets which came with the Hordes of the Underdark expansion pack were used in several persistent worlds, most notably Escape from the Underdark.
