= Deities & Demigods =

Dungeons & Dragons supplement

- Deities & Demigods, first edition cover artwork by Erol Otus
- Author: Various
- Genre: Role-playing game
- Publisher: TSR
- Publication date: 1980
- Media type: Print (Hardcover)
- Pages: 144 (1980 edition); 128 (1981 edition)
- ISBN: 0-935696-22-9 (first edition)
- OCLC: 14001409
- Dewey Decimal: 794 19
- LC Class: GV1469.62.D84 W37 1984

Deities & Demigods (abbreviated DDG), alternatively known as Legends & Lore (abbreviated L&L or LL), is a reference book for the Dungeons & Dragons fantasy role-playing game (D&D). The book provides descriptions and game statistics of gods and legendary creatures from various sources in mythology and fiction, and allows dungeon masters to incorporate aspects of religions and mythos into their D&D campaigns.

The first Deities & Demigods was published in 1980 by TSR, Inc. while another book called Deities and Demigods was published in 2002 by Wizards of the Coast, which acquired the D&D brand with their purchase of TSR in 1998.

The original 1980 edition was the first print appearance of various fictional non-human deities, such as Corellon Larethian, Moradin, Gruumsh, and others, many of which have become standard features of the D&D game and its derivatives. These deities were the creation of Jim Ward. Later printings of Deities & Demigods, beginning in 1981, removed some material present in the 1980 printings.

== Printings ==
=== 1st Edition Advanced Dungeons & Dragons ===
TSR published the first version of Deities & Demigods in 1980 as a 144-page hardcover for the first edition Advanced Dungeons & Dragons rules. This edition, by James M. Ward and Robert J. Kuntz, served to update the material they had earlier included in 1976's Supplement IV: Gods, Demi-Gods & Heroes for the original D&D ruleset. The book presents the game statistics and background information for gods and legendary heroes and creatures taken from various mythologies. The original edition included 12 pantheons of gods taken from both myth and folklore, as well as gods for various nonhuman races, and four groups taken from fictional works: the Arthurian heroes, the Nehwon mythos from Fritz Leiber, the Melnibonéan mythos from Michael Moorcock, and the Cthulhu Mythos from H. P. Lovecraft. These statistics are presented in a fashion similar to that of the Monster Manual, and illustrations accompany the statistics, as well as a short description that details what circumstances might cause the god to personally appear and what actions the god might take in such an instance, and what responsibilities and penchants that god may have. The book also details the mythoi of these religions, as well as what behaviors are expected of clerics, and describes the known planes of existence and how characters may find themselves in the afterlife. Interior illustrations were submitted by Jeff Dee, Eymoth (Kenneth Rahman), Jennell Jaquays, (Note: Credited as Paul Jaquays.) Dave S. LaForce, Jeff Lanners, Erol Otus, Darlene Pekul, Jim Roslof, David C. Sutherland III, and D. A. Trampier.

The original Deities & Demigods includes a nine-page chart for clerics, as well as an entire chapter about the various planes of existence.

For the first 1980 printing, TSR obtained permission from Michael Moorcock for inclusion of Melnibonéan material (from his Elric series of books), and from Arkham House, which claimed to hold the copyrights on a number of works by H. P. Lovecraft, for inclusion of characters from the Cthulhu Mythos. However, Arkham House had already licensed the Cthulhu property to the game company Chaosium. Furthermore, Chaosium had also licensed the Melnibonéan copyright from Moorcock. When Chaosium threatened legal action, the first printing was halted and the two companies agreed on a compromise: TSR could continue to use the material but must provide a credit to Chaosium to do so. TSR added the credit for the second printing of the book.

The Cthulhu and Melnibonéan sections were removed from the 1981 edition, making it a 128-page hardcover (which resulted in the original edition having a high collector's value). TSR felt its material should not contain such an overt reference to one of its competitors and removed the two pantheons altogether, thus negating the need for the credit. For this reason, the first and second printings have generally been in greater demand by D&D fans and collectors. The credit to Chaosium and incorrect page and pantheon counts were still included in some of the subsequent printings.

For the 1985 printing, the book was repackaged and its name was changed to Legends & Lore. This sixth printing featured the name change to avoid potential conflicts with fundamentalist Christian groups such as Patricia Pulling's BADD. Despite the name change and new cover artwork (by Jeff Easley), the interior material was nearly identical to the fifth printing.

In 1999, a paperback reprint of the first edition was released.

=== 2nd Edition Advanced Dungeons & Dragons ===
When the second edition of the Advanced Dungeons & Dragons game was released, a new Legends & Lore was written for it. Cover art is by Jeff Easley, with interior illustrations by George Barr, Terry Dykstra, Erol Otus, Erik Olsen, Jean Elizabeth Martin, Jeff Easley, Carol Heyer, Roger Loveless, John and Laura Lakey, and Keith Parkinson. Legends & Lore was expanded, completely revised from the 1st Edition AD&D volume, and rewritten for the 2nd Edition rules. This edition had pared-down content in comparison to the original; the sections on Babylonian, Finnish, Sumerian and non-humanoid deities were wholly excised. The Central American mythos was renamed the Aztec mythos while the Nehwon mythos was retained. A separate sourcebook, Monster Mythology, later covered the non-human deities in much greater detail than any previous source, introducing several new deities in the process. Furthermore, the late 2nd Edition Planescape book, On Hallowed Ground, gave a virtually comprehensive look at the various pantheons present in the D&D shared universe up to that point, and a level of detail not since exceeded.

=== 3rd Edition Dungeons & Dragons ===
Deities and Demigods
- Authors: Rich Redman, Skip Williams, and James Wyatt
- Genre: Role-playing game
- Publisher: Wizards of the Coast
- Publication date: April 2002
- Media type: Print (Hardcover)
- Pages: 224
- ISBN: 978-0-7869-2654-1

For the third edition of Dungeons & Dragons, the name was changed back to Deities & Demigods and the cover artwork was changed again to bring it more in line with other third edition D&D manuals. The interior material bears little resemblance to the previous printings of the book (first through sixth). Additionally, this edition presents only a few historical pantheons and in something of a vacuum, without any reference to or inclusion of their development in previous D&D sources, choosing instead to detail them as one-off campaign options.

The third edition volume was written by Rich Redman, Skip Williams, and James Wyatt. The cover illustration was by Sam Wood, with interior illustrations by Kyle Anderson, Glen Angus, Matt Cavotta, Dennis Cramer, Tony DiTerlizzi, Jeff Easley, Donato Giancola, Lars Grant-West, Rebecca Guay, Matt Mitchell, Eric Peterson, Wayne Reynolds, Darrell Riche, Richard Sardinha, and Brian Snoddy, with Justin Norman, Arnie Swekel, and Sam Wood.

James Wyatt comments on the book's relationship to similar books from earlier editions: "This book owes a lot to the 1st Edition Deities and Demigods/Legends and Lore book, more so than the 2nd Edition version. However, the new material we introduced meant that we had a lot less room to include the variety of pantheons included in the earlier version. So we chose the pantheons that we felt were (a) most popular and (b) most ensconced in the popular culture of fantasy: the Greek, Norse, and Egyptian. It stung a bit to leave out the Celtic deities, but we just didn't have the space."

=== 4th Edition Dungeons & Dragons ===
Rather than a separate sourcebook, Deities & Demigods is the name of a semi-regular column in Dragon and Dungeon magazines. Deities & Demigods articles in Dragon offers options for players and tips on roleplaying worshippers of a particular god, while articles in Dungeon offer backstory and monsters that DMs can use in a campaign. Starting with Dragon #380, the column was renamed Channel Divinity, though it continues to appear under its original name in Dungeon.

== Artwork ==
The artwork for the first several printings of this "cyclopedia" was created by artists Jeff Dee, Erol Otus, Eymoth, Darlene Pekul, Jennell Jaquays, Jim Roslof, David S. LaForce, David C. Sutherland III, Jeff Lanners, and David A. Trampier, with each artist usually providing all the artwork for an entire pantheon. Erol Otus produced the cover artwork.

The most recent printings of the book contain illustrations from numerous artists and are more in line with the Wizards of the Coast modern treatment of Dungeons & Dragons. These illustrations are in full color, as compared to the black and white art of the original.

== Legal history ==
Deities & Demigods was one of many items named in a 1992 lawsuit between TSR and Game Designers' Workshop regarding the Dangerous Journeys role-playing game and various rulebooks/sourcebooks designed for that game. One section of this lawsuit argued that "The Plane of Shadow in MYTHUS (pages 190 and 402) and MYTHUS MAGICK (pages 21–22, ...) is derived from the Plane of Shadow in the AD&D DEITIES & DEMIGODS book (Appendix 1, page 129); ..."

== Reception ==
=== 1st Edition ===
Kevin Frey reviewed the supplement in The Space Gamer No. 34. He commented that "If you like a wide variety of deities, this is for you. The gods range from Greek to Chinese to Newhon." He noted that "The problem with this book is that worshippers' alignments are too restricted. For example, in the Melnibonean mythos, there are no gods for the alignments of lawful-evil, chaotic-good, lawful-neutral, or neutral-good; the majority were chaotic-evil. What good is a godless lawful-evil cleric?" Frey concluded his review by saying, "On the whole, it's worth [the price]. Any AD&D DM should get this book."

Patrick Amory reviewed Deities and Demigods for Different Worlds magazine and stated that "Deities and Demigods contains monsters, not religions. What is included here is not of the slightest use to anyone in the FRP market and should be avoided like leprosy. The careless butchering of ancient legends, the lack of any details useful for creation of religion in a normal campaign, and the encouragement of the insertion of yet more higher-level monsters for the worst kind of fantasy gaming makes Deities and Demigods fit only for the trashcan."

The original Deities & Demigods was reviewed by Andy Slack in issue #23 of the magazine White Dwarf (February/March 1981), who gave the book a rating of 8 out of 10. Slack called the book "an integral part of the rules", and he found the quick reference chart for clerics particularly worthwhile, which describe items such as what a cleric should wear, what his holy colors and animals are, when and where he should worship, and what he should sacrifice. Slack felt that the book provides an alternative to the approach of inventing one's own religions, "which I expect most AD&D DMs will employ".

In Issue 32 of Abyss, Dave Nalle reviewed Legends & Lore. He had hoped that TSR would correct some of the errors and omissions that had been made in Deities & Demigods, but was disappointed, pointing out that it "is just the same old stuff, with more omissions than can be counted, glaring errors, incalculable inaccuracies, and a dominating attitude which lowers deities to the levels of big monsters and make religion nothing more than another magic item." As an example, Nalle pointed to the description of Odin, commenting, "there are at least 7 major errors which would come clear from reading a single book on Norse myth ... there is no more than a superficial resemblance between the being described and anything found in actual myth or legend." Nalle concluded, "If the goal of TSR is to encourage ignorance and disseminate misinformation, Legends & Lore is a landmark. As mythology or a role-playing aid, it is a crime."

Lawrence Schick, in his 1991 book Heroic Worlds, was critical of the format used for the original Deities and Demigods: "Unfortunately, the book is usually used merely as a sort of Monster Manual that describes very high-powered monsters. This usage is encouraged by the book's format, which emphasizes the gods' physical abilities over their religious significance."

In a retrospective review of Deities & Demigods in Black Gate, Nick Ozment said "One of the most fun, crazy, and controversial tomes to come out of Advanced Dungeons & Dragons was, without a doubt, Deities and Demigods (1980)." Ozment later commented on the artwork by Erol Otus, calling it "some of the oddest, most bizarre, and original illustrations in his D&D oeuvre. This stuff looks like it burst straight out of the most trippy Cthulhu for underground comics of the '70s."

Scott Taylor for Black Gate in 2014 listed Deities & Demigods by Erol Otus as #5 in The Top 10 TSR Cover Paintings of All Time.

Scott Taylor of Black Gate listed the Legends & Lore as #7 on the list of "Top 10 'Orange Spine' AD&D Hardcovers By Jeff Easley, saying "it is hard to recover an Erol Otus, but this image of Odin is probably one of the best you will ever see. Jeff truly knocked this one out of the park in my opinion."

In his 2023 book Monsters, Aliens, and Holes in the Ground, RPG historian Stu Horvath called it a "beguiling book. Much of its initial promise is delivered in the contours of Erol Otus's epic wraparound cover painting." However, Horvath noted by listing the deities' hit points and other game statistics, the book tacitly encouraged high-level power gamers to take on the deities in combat. Nonetheless, Horvath felt the lasting effect of this book was that it may have "encouraged a generation of players to embrace an abiding interest in mythology."

=== 2nd Edition ===
Keith Eisenbeis reviewed the manual in the June–July 1991 issue of White Wolf. His overall view was generally negative while he noted details about priests as a positive. He rated it overall at a 2 out of 5 possible points, qualifying it as "a substandard product".

Schick calls the second edition of Legends & Lore for the 2nd edition rules "a vast improvement... with a much greater emphasis on mythology and the duties of each deity's priesthood".

=== 3rd Edition ===
The reviewer from Pyramid commented on the art for the third edition Deities and Demigods, stating that the book "uses a broader mix of styles than earlier books; some art is done is a more abstract fashion that stands in stark contrast to the crisp look of the veteran Wizards of the Coast artists".

James Voelpel from mania.com commented: "The rulebook's mix of excellent artwork, rules and layout makes Deities and Demigods a real winner. Once again, it is a bit pricey for the average gamer at $29.95, but well worth it for the contents."

The third edition Deities and Demigods won the 2002 Ennie Award for "Best Art (Interior)".

== Reviews ==
- Backstab #39
- Backstab #43 (as "Dieux et demi-dieux")
- Dragão Brasil
- Dragão Brasil
