= Warlord's Tactical Manual =

Warlord's Tactical Manual is a book about Blood Wars published by TSR in January 1996.

== Contents ==
Warlord's Tactical Manual is a book which presents several variations on how to play the game, as well as new official rules for the game and a full listing with pictures of the cards used in the game.

== Reception ==
Chris Baylis reviewed Warlord's Tactical Manual for Arcane magazine, rating it a 4 out of 10 overall. Baylis comments that "In all, this offers nothing to interest players who are not familiar with the Planescape setting, and for owners of Blood Wars its only redeeming factors are the hints on deck building, the tournament rules and the clarification of some of the original obscurities. And even these are probably not enough to justify the steep asking price."
