= Dungeoneer's Survival Guide =

Dungeons & Dragons supplement

- Author: Douglas Niles
- Genre: Role-playing game
- Publisher: TSR
- Publication date: 1986
- Media type: Print (Hardcover)
- Pages: 128
- ISBN: 0880382724

Dungeoneer's Survival Guide is a supplement to the Dungeons & Dragons fantasy role-playing game. The book was written by Douglas Niles, and published by TSR, Inc. in 1986.

== Contents ==
Dungeoneer's Survival Guide is a supplement which details how to run adventures in underground settings with specialized game rules for underground activities such as movement, combat, mining, and skill proficiencies. The book contains a section for Dungeon Masters that provides details on the ecology and the cultures of the underground inhabitants. It includes information on making three-dimensional maps, and presents a campaign area called "Deepearth".

The book includes special game rules for underground activities, combat, travel, and mining, in addition to descriptions of the Underdark and the ecology and cultures of its underground inhabitants, as well as a set of Battlesystem rules for mass-combat in underground settings.

The Dungeoneer's Survival Guide presents new proficiencies, as well as ideas on how to design underground adventures. Characters gain proficiencies by way of "non-weapon proficiency slots", which can be used towards a variety of secondary skills. This book also provides rules on actions such as how well characters aside from thieves climb walls and trees, distances that characters can jump, and the length of time characters can hold their breath.

The book details the types of caverns, how player characters may find and access them, and what may be found there along with the effects of natural hazards like cave-ins, floods, underground streams, poisonous gases, volcanoes and insufficient oxygen. The book describes the history and relationships of the races that live underground, and provides advice on how to run adventuring campaigns underground.

== Publication history ==
Dungeoneer's Survival Guide was written by Douglas Niles, with cover art by Jeff Easley, and was published by TSR in 1986 as a 128-page hardcover. It also features interior illustrations by Doug Chaffee, Greg Harper, Jim Roslof, and Jeff Easley.

The book was re-packaged with the Dark and Hidden Ways adventure pack in 1990 to clear out the remaining stock of Dungeoneer's Survival Guide, a first edition AD&D title rendered out-of-date with the release of second edition AD&D.

In 1999, a paperback reprint of the first edition was released.

== Reception ==
Jim Bambra reviewed Dungeoneer's Survival Guide for White Dwarf #82, commenting that the book "deserves the attention of all 'AD&D' players – even those who prefer the freedom of the wilderness to the depths of the dungeon". Bambra noted that while the book covers the Underdark in detail, it is also a major expansion of the AD&D rules. He felt that the new proficiencies "add a whole new dimension to 'AD&D' gaming", as PCs "can now do more than just fight and cast spells". He also noted that, with proficiencies, characters "are able to make armour and weapons, train animals, cut gems, fight effectively in the dark, climb mountains, swim, and perform many other activities that were simply impossible before ... A skill system is something 'AD&D' has been lacking for a long time, and it is good to see that this one ... fits smoothly and easily into the game." Bambra praised author Doug Niles for creating a sourcebook that "proves that underground adventures can be a lot more than simply killing the monster and grabbing its treasure ... the underground has been transformed from a bleak and dirty dungeon to an exciting and intriguing underground fairyland". He adds that the suggestions on how to run underground campaigns form one of the best discussions on designing adventures, finding it relevant for any campaign, even those belonging to other game systems. Bambra concludes the review by stating "Dungeoneer's Survival Guide is an excellent product which opens many new and exciting opportunities to adventurers everywhere. Don't be put off by the title - 'DSG' contains plenty for ... even the most adamant of wilderness adventurers."

In Issue 2 of the game magazine Gateways, Patricia Travis found "Some new rules are nice, but most are incomplete or far too subjective for practical use." Travis also pointed out that the author "has a habit of mentioning drawbacks and limitations without hinting at solutions", using as an example the section on rope bridges, which "should have included at least one method for building them." Travis called the players' half of the book "an overpriced hint sheet for players" but called the gamemaster section "required reading for all gamemasters, experienced and novice." Travis concluded, "This is the kind of book that should be purchased by a group and shared, allowing the players to look up rock formations, game designers to draw beautiful maps, and gamemasters to learn good technique."

Scott Taylor of Black Gate listed the Dungeoneer's Survival Guide as #10 on the list of "Top 10 'Orange Spine' AD&D Hardcovers By Jeff Easley, saying "[Easley] painted this one before he even came to TSR but they decided to buy it and use it for this cover."

In his 2023 book Monsters, Aliens, and Holes in the Ground, RPG historian Stu Horvath called this book with its myriad rules "a reaction to the contemporaneous movement to lighten rules (à la Ghostbusters, for instance), offering ever more layers of optional systems to frustrate players and slow play ... The rules seem expressly designed to get players to whine, "When do we get to hit things?"

== Reviews ==
- Casus Belli #34 (Aug 1986)
