= Plot & Poison: A Guidebook to Drow =

Plot & Poison: A Guidebook to Drow is a 2002 role-playing game supplement about drow, a race in the world of Dungeons & Dragons, published by Green Ronin Publishing.

== Contents ==
Plot & Poison: A Guidebook to Drow is a supplement in which a drow sourcebook is packed with subraces, prestige classes, feats, poisons, equipment, and cultural lore to expand both mechanical options and roleplay.

== Reviews ==
- Pyramid
- Fictional Reality (Issue 11 - Mar 2003)
- Legions Realm Monthly (Issue 9 - May 2003)
