= Out of the Abyss (Dungeons & Dragons) =

Dungeons & Dragons adventure module

- Rules required: Dungeons & Dragons, 5th edition
- Character levels: 1–15
- Campaign setting: Forgotten Realms
- First published: September 15, 2015
- Pages: 256
- ISBN: 978-0786965816

Out of the Abyss is an adventure module for the 5th edition of the Dungeons & Dragons fantasy role-playing game.

== Plot summary ==
The adventure takes place in the Underdark, and begins when the players are captured by Drow Elves. They escape with a group of other prisoners to find that demons have a stronger influence in the Underdark than expected. As they travel between locations searching for an exit from the Underdark, they discover that various demon lords including Demogorgon, Zuggtmoy, and Juiblex, have been unleashed. They escape, but are called back by leaders in the Dwarven settlement of Gauntlgrym. The players are then tasked to lead a war band through the Underdark in an effort to stop the demons from destroying the world. The adventure ends when the players pit the demon lords against each other before finishing off the remaining wounded ones.

== Publication history ==
Out of the Abyss was released in September 2015 for the Dungeons & Dragons story line "Rage of Demons". The adventure was created by Green Ronin under commission from Wizards of the Coast.

In an interview on Out of the Abyss, Chris Perkins discussed the story inspiration: "We've depicted the Underdark many times before but I don't think we've ever depicted it in an Alice in Wonderland sort of way, where the Underdark becomes the Wonderland of D&D; this crazy weird place that you have to fall down a hole to enter, and it's full of crazy deranged characters. The more you hang around them, the more you begin to understand them, and the more you realize you're going crazy yourself. That became our hook for this Underdark story".

== Reception ==
In Boing Boing's review, Jason Louv wrote that "it's probably the best adventure we've yet seen for the new edition of D&D, improving in many ways upon Princes of the Apocalypse, the previous adventure release, which in itself was a marked improvement over the Tyranny of Dragons story". However, the story does have an "NPC glut" and "while the actual artwork in the book is quite good, a lot of it has been very, very poorly laid out".

In Kotaku's review, Cecilia D'Anastasio wrote that her group of players had initial enthusiasm when playing this story but that couldn't be sustained. She wrote that "soon, after six or so NPC introductions, and an aborted escape attempt from my players, I noticed that, what was enthusiasm an hour ago had become sadness or boredom. There was too much shit. There were too many NPCs. The map was creative as hell but, when navigated, arduous to wrap D&D's ruleset around. All of these plot hooks, role-playing cues and environmental prompts were overwhelming—stifling, even. [...] The content of Out of the Abyss's first chapter was enticing, but the mass of it was paralyzing. My players couldn't discern an entry point of the several dozen provided. We didn't pick it back up".

DieHard GameFan said that "more than the previous 5e campaigns, Out of the Abyss's success really depends on the organization, storytelling and improvisational skills of the DM. This is a fantastic piece and one of the best campaigns D&D has had in at least ten (possibly twenty) years. You just have to be willing to do a lot of work to make it happen."

Out of the Abyss was one of the Judges' Spotlight Winners at the 2016 ENnie Awards.
