= Blood Wars (card game) =

Collectible card game by TSR

- Artwork that appeared on the back of each card
- Designers: Steven Schend
- Publishers: TSR, Inc.
- Players: 2-8
- Playing time: approx 90 min.
- Chance: Some
- Age range: 12+
- Skills: Card playing Arithmetic; Basic Reading Ability

Blood Wars is an out-of-print collectible card game produced by TSR, based on the Planescape campaign setting from Dungeons & Dragons.

== Publication history ==
The game was released in March 1995 as part of TSR's 20th anniversary. The original release contained 334 cards in the set, sold in 15-card booster packs and two 50-card dual decks. Card art was designed by various artists, including Tony DiTerlizzi, Newt Ewell, Henry Higgenbotham, Jennell Jaquays, (Note: Credited as Paul Jaquays.) Dana Knutson, Rob Lazzaretti, Robin Raab, Robh Ruppel, and Dave Sutherland.

A series of expansion sets called escalation packs were scheduled for publication.

Set	Release date	Cards in set	Packaging	Notes
Factols & Factions	June 1995	134	15-card booster packs	
Powers & Proxies	August 1995	125	15-card booster packs	
Insurgents of the Inner Plane	March 1996			This set was not released.
Weapons & Warmongers	1996			This set was cancelled.
Hand of Fate	1996			This set was cancelled.

Insurgents of the Inner Planes never materialized and was halted at the printer in February 1996.

The player guide Warlord's Tactical Manual was published in January 1996.

== Gameplay ==
Players use cards representing Warlords and Legions for combat to claim Battlefield cards.

== Reception ==
The game was said to play "pretty well as a multi-player game, and it's much better than TSR's Spellfire" according to Allen Varney of The Duelist.

== Reviews ==
- The Duelist #5
- Coleção Dragão Brasil

== Legacy ==
Blood Wars was notable for the aggressive stance TSR took against fan websites displaying artwork from the game. The result was to suppress popularity of the game while it was still being published. This was in contrast to Wizards of the Coast, which allowed fair use reproduction of Magic: The Gathering copyrighted images online. The collectability of its chase cards was also notable across collectible card games, especially "The Lady of Pain."

The card game is not associated with the Blood Wars Polish online MMORPG, which is not based on Planescape.
