= Expedition to the Demonweb Pits =

Adventure module for Dungeons & Dragons

- Code: 955687200
- Rules required: D&D 3.5
- Character levels: 9–12
- Campaign setting: Planescape
- Authors: Wolfgang Baur; Gwendolyn F.M. Kestrel
- First published: April 2007

Linked modules
- Queen of the Demonweb Pits; Expedition to the Demonweb Pits

Expedition to the Demonweb Pits is a super-adventure module for the 3.5 edition of the Dungeons & Dragons roleplaying game. The adventure is designed for characters of levels 9–12. It involves the machinations of the demon lords Lolth and Graz'zt and was heavily influenced by the 1980 adventure module Queen of the Demonweb Pits.

== Plot summary ==
Expedition to the Demonweb Pits revolves around the reading of the Dark Pact. The demon lord Graz'zt seeks to form an alliance with Lolth against Orcus. Lolth spurns his offer, and Graz'zt, not taking rejection lightly, now schemes to undermine Lolth. With the aid of his cambion son, Rule-of-Three, Graz'zt plans a Demon Council within the Abyss. While he is doing this, Rule-of-Three spreads word among the drow that their goddess is coming to the Prime Material Plane to wage the eternity war against their hated cousins, the surface elves and their god, Corellon Larethian. After the Demonic Council is arranged, Rule-of-Three and Graz'zt involve a group of mortals (the PCs) about Lolth's coming. Their goal is to bring attention to Lolth in her own Demonweb and then use the mortals to embarrass her in the eyes of the other demon lords, while at the same time, sealing the Dark Pact of planar binding using the divine spark Lolth gives it. It is the PC's goal to prevent the reading of that pact.

=== Items ===
Expedition to the Demonweb Pits offers the characters many items, including two new legend items: Thaas and Spidersilk. Thaas is an ancient magical elven bow dedicated to slaying demons. Spidersilk is a suit of fine armor for arcane spell casters that grants many spider-oriented benefits.

== Publication history ==
The adventure was written by Wolfgang Baur and Gwendolyn F.M. Kestrel, and was published in April 2007 by Wizards of the Coast. Cover art was by David Hudnut, with interior art by David Bircham, Miguel Coimbra, Ed Cox, Carl Critchlow, Eric Deschamps, Wayne England, Erik Gist, Brian Hagan, Ralph Horsley, Howard Lyon, Ted Pendergraft, Arnie Swekel, and James Zhang.

When asked whether this adventure was influenced by module Q1: The Demonweb Pits, designed as a revision, or a completely new expedition, Wolfgang Baur explained: "Of course Expedition was influenced by Q1, since there would be no Demonweb Pits without that classic module. But we took the plot in a new direction, focusing on Planescape elements such as the cities of Sigil and Zelatar, plus a wider web than the first one. Many elements carry across the history of the Demonweb: from 1st edition's Q1, from "The Harrowing" in Dungeon magazine #84, and from 2nd edition's Planes of Chaos. It's a place that has grown over time, and we're continuing that exploration. Possibly with more demons than usual."

== Critical reception ==
Expedition to the Demonweb Pits received a mixed reaction on its release. Wayne Tonjes described it as "very convoluted", with "a few too many places where the plot requires the players to make one specific choice to access key phases of the campaign." However, he did also say it "fulfill[ed] its goal of introducing a whole new spin on a classic module for old school gamers and new players alike."

Nickolas Davis of The Gamer named it the second best adventure published for 3.5, after Eyes of the Lich Queen.

== Reviews ==
- Coleção Dragon Slayer
