= Kevin Llewellyn =

American painter (born 1978)

- Born: 1978 (age 47–48); Ohio, U.S.
- Education: Ringling School of Art and Design
- Known for: Painting
- Notable work: 'Life is Temporary Death is Forever', 'Lacrimosa', 'Foetal Skull of Nascency', 'Lust for Life'

Kevin Llewellyn (born 1978) is an American painter.

== Early life and education ==
Llewellyn was born in Ohio. His family is from Columbiana, Ohio; his sister Kristen is also an artist. He graduated from the Ringling College of Art and Design.

== Career ==
Llewellyn is known for his realistic portraits, full-body portraits, and paintings that feature dark subject matter. He frequently utilizes techniques of 17th-century painting masters.

Kevin has taught art workshops at Gnomon, Wonderland LA, ConceptArt.org events and at colleges around the United States and Europe.

He was the opening artist for Kat Von D's art gallery, Wonderland LA, and has had his artwork accepted in the National Midyear Show of the Butler Institute of American Art. He has additionally done illustrations for Cradle of Filth.

Llewellyn does commercial artwork under the professional name "Puddnhead". This includes artwork for Magic: The Gathering and Dungeons & Dragons. His commercial clients have also included Madonna and Guy Ritchie.

== Publications ==
Llewellyn illustrated the cover Nikki Sixx's album, This Is Gonna Hurt, as well as the cover of his photography book, This is Gonna Hurt: Music, Photography and Life, Through the Distorted Lens of Nikki Sixx.

Llewellyn's work was also the subject of a solo exhibition, called "The Unsaid," at LA's Wonderland Gallery. A catalogue was produced for the exhibition.
