= David S. LaForce =

American artist

David "Diesel" S. LaForce is an American artist who worked on Dungeons & Dragons adventures published by TSR. His artwork and cartography appeared in many TSR products produced from 1979 to 1984 including the classic adventures Q1 Queen of the Demonweb Pits, A1 Slave Pits of the Undercity, and B2 Keep on the Borderlands (the most published roleplaying adventure of all time). LaForce became known for his meticulous and creative approach to adventure maps, and eventually became TSR's staff cartographer. He continued to produce maps for many TSR publications until he left the company in 1997 following its takeover by Wizards of the Coast.

== Before TSR ==
David LaForce grew up in Lake Geneva, Wisconsin at the time when Gary Gygax was co-developing the role-playing game Dungeons & Dragons (D&D). LaForce's circle of friends included Gygax's son Ernie, Skip Williams, and Rob Kuntz. Kuntz was one of the first people after Gygax to run a D&D game, and LaForce, who was rooming with Kuntz, became a regular player in Kuntz's game.

== TSR ==
=== Shipping department ===
In 1978, TSR had outgrown their original headquarters, and the company's managers decided to move into a larger building. LaForce's best friend Ken Reek had a job in the shipping department, and LaForce, who was unemployed, volunteered to help Reek during the move. Company president Kevin Blume was impressed by LaForce's initiative, and hired him to work in the shipping department.

=== Art department ===
By this time, several of TSR's first generation of artists were leaving, and artistic director David Sutherland was looking for replacements. Hearing that LaForce drew pictures in his spare time, Sutherland asked him to create some art for the new Advanced Dungeons and Dragons Dungeon Masters Guide. LaForce produced three sketches, and Sutherland bought two of them for $35 each. Both sketches subsequently appeared in the new publication. LaForce was moved to the art department. His first assignment there was to produce some artwork for a booklet included with the adventure C1: The Hidden Shrine of Tamoachan. Jim Bambra, writing a generally favourable review for the British RPG magazine White Dwarf, noted that "the accompanying booklet of black and white illustrations enhance the atmosphere even more."

He was subsequently assigned to produce artwork for other new projects. It was during this time that Mike Carr gave LaForce his nickname "Diesel", based on LaForce's initials "DSL", which he used as his artistic signature.

As part of his staff activities, LaForce became one of the organizers of the Gen Con art show in 1979, and continued to be involved even after he left TSR.

=== Staff cartographer ===
Detail of isomorphic map of Xak Tsaroth, from DL1 Dragons of Despair

One of the tasks that most of the staff artists disliked was drawing maps for the adventures. LaForce had taken a drafting class in high school, and discovered that he enjoyed the meticulous, detailed work required to produce maps. Within a few years, he was producing most of the maps for TSR product lines.

Scott Taylor, art director of Gygax Magazine, emphasized of the importance of creative cartography during this period: "During my time in the industry I’ve heard various stories concerning maps and their creation, most being that artists hated doing them or having them assigned to them when there was ‘real’ art to be done. I’m not sure this was always the case, but I can say that for particularly ‘old school’ gamers the designs of David ‘Diesel’ LaForce and Steve Sullivan are just as integral and important to the game, and probably more so, as any cover painting by [Larry] Elmore or [Jeff] Easley."

By 1984, most of LaForce's output was map-related, and he was given the staff title of "cartographer".

LaForce's approach to map-making was creative. In DL1 Dragons of Despair, the first adventure of TSR's new Dragonlance product line, the city of Xak Tsaroth was described by author Tracy Hickman as descending over the side of a canyon. Rather than attempt to portray using standard two-dimensional ("bird's eye") maps, LaForce recreated the city as a series of interlinked isomorphic maps.

== After TSR ==
When TSR ran into financial difficulties in 1997, it was taken over by Wizards of the Coast (WotC). TSR staff were given the choice of staying with WotC and moving from Lake Geneva to WotC's headquarters in Renton, Washington, or resigning. LaForce left the company and stayed in Lake Geneva. After unsuccessfully trying to make a living as a freelance artist, he turned to manual labour, becoming a groundsman for a drilling crew.

In 2006, he returned to creative work, taking up sculpture for a living. He occasionally does creative work for the fantasy gaming community; in February 2013, he was listed as a contributing artist in the first issue of Gygax Magazine.

== Select bibliography ==
As contributing illustrator

- Ghost Tower of Inverness (1979)
- Keep on the Borderlands (1979)
- The Hidden Shrine of Tamoachan (1980)
- Queen of the Demonweb Pits (1980)
- Slave Pits of the Undercity (1980))
- Expedition to the Barrier Peaks (1980)
- Deities and Demigods (1980)
- The Rogues Gallery (1980)
- The World of Greyhawk (1980)
- Palace of the Silver Princess (1981, original orange edition)
- D&D Basic Rulebook
