= Queen of the Demonweb Pits =

Dungeons & Dragons adventure module

- Cover, with a group of adventurers confronting Lolth and her minions (art by Jim Roslof)
- Code: Q1
- TSR product code: 9035
- Rules required: Advanced Dungeons & Dragons 1st edition
- Character levels: 10–14
- Campaign setting: Greyhawk
- Authors: David Sutherland; Gary Gygax
- First published: October 1980

Linked modules
- G1 G2 G3 D1 D2 D3 Q1; Expedition to the Demonweb Pits

Queen of the Demonweb Pits (Q1) is an adventure module for the Dungeons & Dragons roleplaying game written by David Sutherland. The "Q" in the module code is an abbreviation for "queen". The module, a sequel to the D series of modules, was novelized in 2001.

It is the seventh module in an epic series of adventures set in the World of Greyhawk, beginning with raids by local hill giants and other events described in the G1-3 Against the Giants modules. The series becomes an odyssey into the Underdark, as described in the "Drow" series of modules: D1 (Descent into the Depths of the Earth), D2 (Shrine of the Kuo-Toa) and D3 (Vault of the Drow). D1 and D2 were later compiled into a single adventure, D1-2: Descent into the Depths of the Earth. This module brings the player characters to the Abyss to fight the evil drow demigod Lolth.

== Plot summary ==
At the end of Vault of the Drow, the characters find an astral gate leading to the Abyssal realm of Lolth, Demon Queen of Spiders, goddess of the drow elves and architect of the plot involving hill giants, frost giants, fire giants, kuo-toa and drow. Her realm, the 66th layer of the Abyss, is known as the Demonweb Pits. The player characters are sent to another plane and trapped in a labyrinth known as the Demonweb, and must escape the web and defeat Lolth in her lair to return home.

The Q1 module was the first to offer a glimpse into the Abyss, home to the D&D race of demons. It features a map of the Demonweb Pits, a series of interweaving passageways through a maelstrom of lost souls in the Abyss. Characters who venture off the path are probably lost, and many spells work differently (or not at all). In the maze there are portals to other worlds, some to which Lolth sends minions to invade (such as a winter world and a world of permanent night). Queen of the Demonweb Pits is an open-ended adventure; each portal can lead to a large area, from which the dungeon master can launch a new campaign.

The player characters make their way through Lolth's webs, where her minions, slaves, guards and captives all challenge the characters. At the end of the module the players face a final, difficult confrontation with Lolth, and a giant, mechanical spider which she can control. The dungeon introduces Lolth's handmaidens, the demonic Yochlol.

== Publication history ==
After the publication of the first six modules in the series, there was a delay in this module's development and release. According to Gary Gygax, he found it difficult to write; Sutherland proposed an outline which impressed Gygax so much that he decided to use it.

Queen of the Demonweb Pits was the tournament dungeon for the 1979 Origins game convention. Sutherland and Gygax designed the module, which was published in 1980 as a 32-page booklet and map folder. The module had two outer folders, with a cover by Jim Roslof and interior illustrations by Erol Otus and Jeff Dee. Queen of the Demonweb Pits was intended as the final adventure in a series of seven adventures by Gygax.

The module, the D-series' sequel, was later republished as part of the Queen of the Spiders supermodule (coded GDQ1-7) with the entire saga. Queen of the Demonweb Pits was published by Wizards of the Coast as a novel of the same name by Paul Kidd for the Greyhawk Classics series in 2001. In 2007 its setting was revisited in the Wizards of the Coast adventure module, Expedition to the Demonweb Pits.

When Queen of the Demonweb Pits was released, each Dungeons & Dragons module was marked with an alphanumeric code indicating its series. The "Q" in its module code represents "queen".

== Reception ==
Elisabeth Barrington reviewed Queen of the Demonweb Pits in 1981 as part of a review in the 35th issue of The Space Gamer. According to Barrington, players and the Dungeon Master need to be fairly experienced because some spell effects have been altered: "It takes skill, courage, and ingenuity to make your way into (and possibly, if you're lucky, out of) the pits. A good challenge for experienced players." Barrington did complain that some of the spell alterations felt unnecessary, as some of the spells which were very useful under ordinary circumstances became almost useless due to the alterations. She did note that the book contained "many excellent ideas", and that the artwork was "up to TSR's usual neatness and simplicity", but that overall the module was "Not one of TSR's best efforts, but a worthy try." Dungeon Master for Dummies rates Queen of the Demonweb Pits as one of the ten best classic adventures.

Ken Denmead of Wired listed it as one of his "Top 10 D&D Modules I Found in Storage This Weekend". Denmead wrote that the module, intended for levels 10–14, was published "before level-inflation had taken its toll on a weary nation. In year 2007 levels, that’s like 100!" He described a number of aspects of the Abyss as psychedelic, calling the web's doors similar to the "loony corridor scene from Sgt. Pepper's Lonely Heart Club Band." According to Denmead, "This is one big, bad module, and if you make it to the end, well, there's just one last monster to take care of. [...] You are, in effect, trying to take out a goddess. Good luck with that." Combined as a single adventure with the rest of GDQ series, the module was voted the single greatest adventure of all time by Dungeon magazine in 2004 (the 30th anniversary of the Dungeons & Dragons game).

Francesco Cacciatore for Polygon commented in 2025 that "The final module in the campaign, Queen of the Demonweb Pits, is, unfortunately, the poster child for not living up to hype. Not only does it not make sense story-wise for the characters to go after Lolth, but the depiction of the 66th layer of the Abyss is far from the vision of madness populated by Giger-inspired horrors it should be. A spaceship and a giant spider robot are not the way that this epic campaign should have ended, but blame Gygax for not finishing what he started."
