= David C. Sutherland III =

American artist and game designer (1949–2005)

- Born: April 4, 1949; Minneapolis, Minnesota, U.S.
- Died: June 6, 2005 (aged 56); Sault Ste. Marie, Michigan, U.S.
- Resting place: Fort Snelling National Cemetery
- Known for: Fantasy art, game design
- Notable work: Player's Handbook; Dungeon Master's Guide

David C. Sutherland III (April 4, 1949 – June 6, 2005) was an artist whose work influenced the early development of Dungeons & Dragons (D&D).

== Early life and inspiration ==
Sutherland was born April 4, 1949 in Minneapolis, Minnesota, and was a graduate of Minneapolis' Roosevelt High School. He studied as a commercial artist for two years at the Minneapolis Area Vocational Technical Institute before serving in the United States Army as a military police officer in the Vietnam War, serving in 1969–1970. After his return from the war, he began his career as a fantasy artist, while working whatever other jobs he could find. His artistic talents were nurtured and developed by his father, a fellow artist. David C. Sutherland II worked in the paper industry and encouraged his son by bringing home creative materials and supplies.

He became involved with the Society for Creative Anachronism (SCA) in the early 1970s. He spent his free time drawing sketches and cartoons related to these pastimes.

== Career ==
Sutherland's cover for the original Dungeon Masters Guide (TSR, 1979)

Sutherland's involvement in game art began in 1974. After meeting Michael Mornard, a player in Gary Gygax' "Greyhawk" and then Dave Arneson's "Blackmoor" in the SCA, he was introduced to Professor M.A.R. Barker at the University of Minnesota in 1975. Barker was designing Tékumel, an imaginary world for use with D&D, published by TSR, Inc., the Wisconsin-based role-playing game publisher.

The professor put him in touch with TSR, and soon after, Sutherland was working for them. Sutherland worked under the D&D game's co-inventor, Gary Gygax, as part of a team of illustrators, including Erol Otus, Darlene Pekul, and David Trampier. Sutherland also worked as the artistic director for TSR, while also working on his own illustrations. He worked at TSR until 1997 when the company was in the process of being purchased by Wizards of the Coast and he was not offered further employment.

== Decline and death ==
After his relationship with TSR ended, Sutherland found it difficult to find work. Sutherland remained upset about the dissolution of his marriage and divorce. An auction of Sutherland memorabilia—including artwork, miniature sculptures, games, and game memorabilia—was held in 2004, raising US$22,000, used to set up a trust fund for his two daughters.

He died of chronic liver failure on June 6, 2005, in his home in Sault Ste. Marie, Michigan. He was buried on June 22, 2005, with full military honors at Fort Snelling National Cemetery in Minneapolis, Minnesota.

== Notable works ==
- He wrote the adventure module Queen of the Demonweb Pits (Q1) (with some editing from Gary Gygax).
- He created the wemic, a D&D lion-centaur.
- He drew the isometric maps of Castle Ravenloft for the 1st Edition Advanced Dungeons & Dragons (AD&D) adventure module Ravenloft. As the newly revised version of the module, Expedition to Castle Ravenloft, explains in the introduction, these maps were "such a powerful aid to play that a generation of Dungeon Masters still fondly recall them and reemploy them whenever possible." Sutherland is even honored in the story of this newest version of the Ravenloft module, as there is a mention of a "Dhavit Uthurlan" as the designer of the castle.
- He is the cover artist for the first edition rules of the AD&D Dungeon Master's Guide.
- He illustrated the scene of a dragon, a wizard and an armored archer on the first D&D boxed set, described as "A simple composition, it shows a wand-waving magic user and a knight, his longbow drawn, squaring off against a dragon who sits—à la Smaug from The Hobbit—atop a vast pile of gold coins and jewels."
- He also illustrated the original cover of the first edition Advanced Dungeons & Dragons Monster Manual.
