= The Legend of Drizzt =

Series of Forgotten Realms novels

The Legend of Drizzt is a series of fantasy novels by R. A. Salvatore that began in 1988, They are based in the Forgotten Realms setting in the dimension of Abeir-Toril on the continent Faerûn in the Dungeons & Dragons universe currently published and owned by Wizards of the Coast. It combines the series The Dark Elf Trilogy, The Icewind Dale Trilogy, Legacy of the Drow, Paths of Darkness, The Hunter's Blades Trilogy, and other sets into an abridged compilation. Drizzt Do'Urden is the main character of most of the books.

The series mostly follows the eponymous Drizzt Do'Urden, a drow, or dark elf, portrayed against the stereotypes of his race, who defies the evil nation of his birth with his swordsmanship and courage. He abandons the Underdark, a barren land of unmarked and limitless tunnels where deadly creatures continually lurk. His journey for freedom leads him to the surface where he faces discrimination at every turn because of his dark heritage. Drizzt stumbles along in a harsh world until he finally comes upon friends who understand the kindness of his heart. Together, they fight for justice against sinister enemies who dare to disrupt the peace of Drizzt's newfound homeland.

== Main titles ==
This series includes re-issues of novels (with new cover art) that had previously been published under different series titles. In this list, they are numbered not in the order of their original publication, but rather in their chronological order in Drizzt's life. The first six novels in this series had never previously been released in a hardcover edition. Note: The Hunter's Blades Trilogy has not been re-issued as part of the Legend of Drizzt series, but later releases have been considered as such.

Series	Books	Title
The Dark Elf Trilogy	1–3	Homeland; Exile; Sojourn
The Icewind Dale Trilogy	4–6	The Crystal Shard; Streams of Silver; The Halfling's Gem
Legacy of the Drow	7–10	The Legacy; Starless Night; Siege of Darkness; Passage to Dawn
Paths of Darkness	11–13	The Silent Blade; The Spine of the World; Sea of Swords
The Sellswords	14–16	Servant of the Shard; Promise of the Witch-King; Road of the Patriarch
The Hunter's Blades Trilogy	17–19	The Thousand Orcs; The Lone Drow; The Two Swords
Transitions	20–22	The Orc King; The Pirate King; The Ghost King
Neverwinter Saga	23–26	Gauntlgrym; Neverwinter; Charon's Claw; The Last Threshold
The Sundering	27	The Companions
Companions Codex	28–30	Night of the Hunter; Rise of the King; Vengeance of the Iron Dwarf
Homecoming	31–33	Archmage; Maestro; Hero
Generations	34–36	Timeless; Boundless; Relentless
The Way of the Drow	37–39	Starlight Enclave; Glacier's Edge; Lolth's Warrior

== Short stories ==
Also released was a set of classic short stories that expanded the character's legacy, in an anthology titled The Collected Stories: The Legend of Drizzt. It includes the following short stories:

- "The First Notch"
- "Dark Mirror"
- "The Third Level"
- "Guenhwyvar"
- "That Curious Sword"
- "Wickless in the Nether"
- "The Dowry"
- "Comrades at Odds"
- "If They Ever Happened Upon My Lair"
- "Bones and Stones"
- "Iruladoon"
- "To Legend He Goes"

Furthermore, several portions of the entire series have been reprinted in boxed sets:

- The Legend of Drizzt Boxed Set, Books I-III (containing Homeland, Exile, and Sojourn)
- The Legend of Drizzt Boxed Set, Books IV-VI (containing The Crystal Shard, Streams of Silver, and The Halfling's Gem)
- The Legend of Drizzt Boxed Set, Books VII-X (containing The Legacy, Starless Night, Siege of Darkness, and Passage to Dawn)
- The Legend of Drizzt Boxed Set, Books XI-XIII (containing The Silent Blade, The Spine of the World, and The Sea of Swords)
- The Hunter's Blades Trilogy (containing Books XIV-XVI: The Thousand Orcs, The Lone Drow, and The Two Swords)
- Transitions (containing Books XVII-XIX: The Orc King, The Pirate King, and The Ghost King)

Portions of the entire series have been reprinted in single-book collector's edition:

- The Legend of Drizzt Collector's Edition, Book I (containing Homeland, Exile, and Sojourn)
- The Legend of Drizzt Collector's Edition, Book II (containing The Crystal Shard, Streams of Silver, and The Halfling's Gem)
- The Legend of Drizzt Collector's Edition, Book III (containing The Legacy, Starless Night, Siege of Darkness, and Passage to Dawn)
- The Legend of Drizzt Collector's Edition, Book IV (containing The Silent Blade, The Spine of the World, and The Sea of Swords)

== Reception ==
The Legend of Drizzt books are very popular with fantasy fans. A significant number of novels featuring the character of Drizzt written by Salvatore have made The New York Times Best Seller list, starting with The Crystal Shard. The Orc King, which marked the 20th anniversary of the character, made it to #7 on the list, as well as #9 on The Wall Street Journal list, #6 on the Publishers Weekly bestseller list, and #36 on the USA Today list of top sellers.

The Two Swords peaked at #4 on The New York Times Best Seller list in 2004. It reached the top of The Wall Street Journal's hardcover bestseller list after only two weeks, a record for its publisher Wizards of the Coast. It also debuted at #4 on The New York Times's bestseller list and #2 on Publishers Weekly bestseller list.

The Lone Drow debuted at #7 on The New York Times Best Seller list in October 2003. Publishers Weekly felt that The Lone Drow was clichéd, but that some of the characters did achieve "some complexity". They singled out two characters for praise: Innovindel, an elf who talks "pensively" of her long life in contrast to the short lived humans, and Obould the orc king.
