= 2011 in games =

This page lists board and card games, wargames, miniatures games, and tabletop role-playing games published in 2011. For video games, see 2011 in video gaming.

== Games released or invented in 2011 ==
- 1830: The Game of Railroads and Robber Barons (new edition)
- 7 Wonders: Catan Island
- 7 Wonders: Leaders
- Arkham Horror: Miskatonic Horror Expansion
- Ascension: Chronicle of the Godslayer
- Belfort
- Carcassonne: 10 Year Special Edition
- Carcassonne: Die Schule
- Carcassonne: The Dice Game
- Carcassonne: The Phantom
- Cards Against Humanity
- The Castles of Burgundy
- Commands & Colors: Ancients Expansion Pack #6: The Spartan Army
- Conquest of Nerath
- Discworld: Ankh-Morpork
- Dixit Odyssey
- Dominion: Cornucopia
- Dominion: Governor Promo Card
- Dominion: Hinterlands
- Dreadfleet
- Eclipse (board game)
- Elder Sign
- A Few Acres of Snow
- Flash Point: Fire Rescue
- Fresco: Expansion Modules 4, 5 and 6
- Kingdom Builder
- Mage Knight Board Game
- Mansions of Madness
- Munchkin Zombies
- Oz Fluxx
- Pirate Fluxx
- K2
- King of Tokyo
- The Legend of Drizzt
- Kolejka
- Power Grid: The First Sparks
- Power Grid: The Robots
- Power Grid: Theme Park
- Puerto Rico: Limited Anniversary Edition
- Sentinels of the Multiverse
- Shards of the Throne
- Small World: Tunnels
- Small World Underground
- Stone Age: Style is the Goal
- Sword Girls
- Thunderstone: Dragonspire
- Thunderstone: Heart of Doom
- Thunderstone: Thornwood Siege
- Ticket to Ride: Alvin & Dexter
- Ticket to Ride Map Collection: Volume 1 - Team Asia & Legendary Asia
- Ticket to Ride Map Collection: Volume 2 - India & Switzerland
- Trajan
- Village
- Wrath of Ashardalon

== Game awards given in 2011 ==
- Spiel des Jahres: Qwirkle
- Kennerspiel des Jahres: 7 Wonders
- Deutscher Spiele Preis: 7 Wonders
- Games: Tikal II: The Lost Temple
- Ora et Labora won the Spiel Portugal Jogo do Ano.

== Significant game-related events in 2011 ==
- Quebec-based distributor Filosofia purchased Z-Man Games.

== Deaths ==
| Date | Name | Age | Notability |
|---|---|---|---|
| February 16 | Hans Joachim Alpers | 67 | co-founder of German company Fantasy Productions |
| March 19 | Jim Roslof | 64 | illustrator, known for work on Dungeons & Dragons |
| April 9 | Ned Strongin | 91 | Game designer who co-designed Connect Four |
| April 26 | Douglas Chaffee | 75 | illustrator |
| June 7 | Leonard B. Stern | 88 | Co-developer of Mad Libs |
| July 31 | Ian Daglish | 59 | Wargame designer |
| November 30 | Zdeněk Miler | 90 | Artist who contributed to Ravensburger games |

== See also ==
- List of game manufacturers
- 2011 in video gaming
