= Wulfgar (Forgotten Realms) =

Fictional character in the Forgotten Realms

- Forgotten Realms character
- Wulfgar as depicted in Dungeonology (2016). Artwork by Brian Matyas.
- First appearance: The Crystal Shard (1988)
- Created by: R. A. Salvatore

In-universe information
- Race: Human
- Class: Barbarian
- Family: Beornegar (father)
- Home: Icewind Dale

Wulfgar, son of Beornegar, is a fictional character in R. A. Salvatore's The Legend of Drizzt novels, which are set in the Forgotten Realms campaign setting for the Dungeons & Dragons role-playing game. A human barbarian from Icewind Dale, he is one of the five Companions of the Hall and is usually depicted fighting with the magical warhammer Aegis-fang. Wulfgar first appeared in Salvatore's debut novel, The Crystal Shard which ws published in 1988. Salvatore initially intended him to be the novel's protagonist and created Drizzt Do'Urden as his sidekick, but Drizzt displaced Wulfgar as the central character while the novel was being written.

Wulfgar remains a principal member of the Companions of the Hall ensemble in The Icewind Dale Trilogy and subsequent series. Later novels depict his presumed death, years of captivity and torture by a demon, and difficulty readjusting after his return. His recovery is a major subject of 1998's The Silent Blade and the central story of The Spine of the World published the following year. Following a century-long advance in the setting's chronology, Wulfgar and the other shorter-lived Companions were eventually returned to life in 2013's The Companions.

The character has also appeared in comics and games, including as a playable character in Dungeons & Dragons: Dark Alliance (2021). Academic discussions have examined Wulfgar as an example of the conventional warrior archetype and of the translation of role-playing-game mechanics into prose. Reviews have differed over whether Salvatore successfully developed him beyond that archetype, particularly in the novels concerning his trauma and recovery.

== Concept and creation ==
Salvatore's first proposal for a Forgotten Realms novel used a character from Douglas Niles's Darkwalker on Moonshae to introduce Wulfgar, whom Salvatore expected to be his principal character. After TSR requested a story with a new cast, Salvatore devised a drow ranger as Wulfgar's sidekick and named him Drizzt Do'Urden. While writing an early scene in The Crystal Shard, Salvatore decided that Drizzt should instead become the lead. In an academic chapter about diversity in role-playing games, Matthias Roick similarly recounts the spur-of-the-moment invention of a drow ranger as Wulfgar's companion.

Salvatore later wrote Wulfgar's apparent death into The Legacy (1992). He recalled receiving sharply divided letters from readers, some of whom praised the decision while others demanded the character's return. Salvatore said that he remained uncertain whether Wulfgar was truly dead and restored him in Passage to Dawn (1996), partly because he expected another author to do so after his departure from TSR. He later valued the decision because it allowed him to explore the consequences of Wulfgar's imprisonment.

The Spine of the World was conceived as a study of Wulfgar recovering after torture had left him psychologically and spiritually damaged. Salvatore expected the change in focus to divide readers; he later said that some objected to Wulfgar's continuing difficulties after his physical recovery, while others identified with the character's gradual progress. When the Forgotten Realms chronology was advanced by a century for the fourth edition of Dungeons & Dragons, Wulfgar and Drizzt's other shorter-lived companions could no longer continue alongside him. They received new lives as part of a later restoration of the group. Salvatore contrasted the honorable Wulfgar's first life with the hedonistic approach he takes after his return, explaining that Wulfgar regards his new life as a reward after having already fulfilled his obligations.

== Publication history ==
Wulfgar is introduced in The Crystal Shard as a young warrior captured after the barbarian tribes attack the settlements of Ten-Towns. Bruenor Battlehammer spares him in exchange for five years and a day of service. During that time Wulfgar becomes close to Bruenor, trains with Drizzt and receives Aegis-fang, a magical warhammer forged for him by the dwarf. He subsequently assumes leadership of the tribes and helps defend Ten-Towns. In Streams of Silver (1989) and The Halfling's Gem (1990), he accompanies Bruenor's search for Mithral Hall and helps rescue Regis from the assassin Artemis Entreri.

In The Legacy, Wulfgar's relationship with Catti-brie deteriorates as he becomes controlling and jealous, and he is believed killed while protecting her during a battle. Passage to Dawn reveals that he survived and had instead been held and tortured by the demon Errtu. After the Companions rescue him, The Silent Blade and The Spine of the World depict his hallucinations, anger and dependence on alcohol as he separates from his friends and attempts to build a new life. Sea of Swords (2001) reunites Wulfgar with the other Companions and restores Aegis-fang to him.

Wulfgar again travels with the Companions in The Hunter's Blades Trilogy. After his wife is killed, The Orc King (2007) follows his search for their adopted daughter and his eventual decision to return to the tribes of Icewind Dale. Later books establish that Wulfgar lived to old age. He is among the Companions given a second life in The Companions, after which the reunited group appears in the Companions Codex trilogy. A review of the trilogy's final volume singled out Wulfgar and Regis as an effective pairing when the two are separated from the rest of the group.

== Other media ==
Wulfgar appears in Andrew Dabb's comic adaptations of the three novels in The Icewind Dale Trilogy, which were originally published by Devil's Due Publishing and collected by IDW Publishing in 2012.

Wulfgar appears with Drizzt, Bruenor, Catti-brie and Regis as a non-player character in the 2000 role-playing game Baldur's Gate II: Shadows of Amn. The player's party can encounter the group after leaving the Underdark and seek its help against the vampire Bodhi.

He is one of four playable characters at the launch of the action role-playing game Dungeons & Dragons: Dark Alliance (2021), alongside Drizzt, Bruenor and Catti-brie. The developers based each character's gameplay identity on their customary weapon; Wulfgar specializes in warhammers, including Aegis-fang.

Wulfgar was represented as the legendary creature card "Wulfgar of Icewind Dale" in the Draconic Rage Commander deck associated with the 2021 Adventures in the Forgotten Realms set for Magic: The Gathering.

== Reception and analysis ==
In a study of narrative in tabletop role-playing games, Jennifer Grouling Cover identifies Drizzt and Wulfgar as the characters for which Salvatore is best known. In the same discussion, she describes the tension between writing novels in a game setting and readers' expectations that characters should conform to game rules. Aidan-Paul Canavan classifies Wulfgar as a prose counterpart of the role-playing game's warrior class. He compares Wulfgar and Caramon Majere with Conan the Barbarian, describing them as examples of the strong, honest and hot-headed young warrior common to adventure fiction.

Tanja Monique Bruske-Guth examines Wulfgar as an example of how the abstract attributes of a role-playing-game character are translated into prose. She argues that the unusually exact description of his body makes numerical game characteristics visually comprehensible, while his habit of counting defeated enemies echoes both heroic myth and the award of experience points in a game. In her reading, Wulfgar's years with Bruenor reshape him physically and ethically: he does not renounce violence, but redirects it against evil. She interprets the gift of Aegis-fang as a common fantasy motif in which a named magical weapon gives its bearer power while testing whether he can exercise it responsibly.

Assessments of Wulfgar's characterization in the earlier titles of The Legend of Drizzt series have varied. Reviewing The Crystal Shard, Tim Scheidler of Fantasy Literature considered Wulfgar a comparatively simple character, but sufficiently heroic to carry the story before Drizzt assumes increasing narrative importance. Piotr Kucharski of the Polish fantasy publication Poltergeist likewise regarded Drizzt and Wulfgar as the novel's joint leads and found Wulfgar nearly as well realized as his mentor, while criticizing the frequency of combat scenes for flattening the characters. Rob Bricken of io9 emphasized the characters' exaggerated power, noting that Wulfgar and Drizzt defeat twenty-five giants without assistance.

The later attempt to deepen Wulfgar's characterization also divided reviewers. Scheidler found his trauma-related storyline in The Silent Blade promising but largely preparatory, and judged The Spine of the World an unsuccessful attempt to make Wulfgar carry a novel again. Reviewing The Orc King, John Ottinger similarly argued that the character's continued isolation repeated an arc that earlier books had already resolved. By contrast, Barbagallo praised the later partnership of Wulfgar and Regis in Vengeance of the Iron Dwarf, writing that their resourcefulness made their chapters a highlight of the novel.
