= Dungeons & Dragons: Dark Alliance =

2021 video game

- Developer: Tuque Games
- Publisher: Wizards of the Coast
- Composer: Vibe Avenue
- Engine: Unreal Engine 4
- Platforms: Microsoft Windows; PlayStation 4; PlayStation 5; Xbox One; Xbox Series X/S
- Release: 22 June 2021
- Genre: Action role-playing
- Modes: Single-player, multiplayer

Dungeons & Dragons: Dark Alliance is a third-person action role-playing game published by Wizards of the Coast and developed by its subsidiary Tuque Games. Based on the Dungeons & Dragons tabletop role-playing system, the title of the game alludes to Baldur's Gate: Dark Alliance and Baldur's Gate: Dark Alliance II, seeing itself as their spiritual successor, although its story and gameplay are not related to those earlier titles. The game was released in June 2021 for Microsoft Windows, PlayStation 4, PlayStation 5, Xbox One, and Xbox Series X/S. It was delisted from digital storefronts and had its online multiplayer servers shut down on February 24, 2025, though the single-player mode remains accessible to existing owners.

== Gameplay ==
Dark Alliance is set in the tundra region of Icewind Dale, and features characters from R. A. Salvatore's novel series The Legend of Drizzt, including the four playable characters: Drizzt Do'Urden, Catti-brie, Bruenor Battlehammer, and Wulfgar. The game includes both single-player and multiplayer modes. In the single-player mode, the player can choose any of the four characters to control, and swap between them. The multiplayer mode allows for online co-op for up to four players.

== Development ==
In 2019, Tuque Games was developing a Dungeons & Dragons game in partnership with Wizards of the Coast. Wizards of the Coast acquired Tuque Games that October. Salvatore assisted the game's development and has been involved in the game's production since its inception. Local cooperative multiplayer was initially announced, though the feature was subsequently dropped by the developer, until it was confirmed that the feature would be available via a post-release patch. Dungeons & Dragons: Dark Alliance was officially announced with a teaser trailer shown during The Game Awards 2019 in December. The game was originally slated for release in 2020, but was later delayed to 2021. The game was released for Microsoft Windows, PlayStation 4, PlayStation 5, Xbox One, and Xbox Series X/S on 22 June 2021 and was simultaneously released on the Xbox Game Pass service. Koch Media published the retail version of the game.

=== Setting ===
In the Forgotten Realms campaign setting, Dungeons & Dragons: Dark Alliance is set after the 1988 novel The Crystal Shard, the first book in Salvatore's The Icewind Dale Trilogy, and the fourth book in the Legend of Drizzt series. The game takes place in the Icewind Dale region of Faerûn. On the connection, Salvatore said: "First of all, if you've read the books and you play the game, you'll probably get a more satisfying experience out of the game. [...] [The] game will bring more to the story than you've gotten from the books now. [...] If you're doing a video game, you're going to have to take some literary license and maybe not stick completely with it. [...] Little things like that don't bother me at all when you're talking about a video game—because your job, when you're making the video game, first and foremost, is to make sure that players are having fun, and they're writing their own story".

Both Dungeons & Dragons: Dark Alliance and Icewind Dale: Rime of the Frostmaiden (2020) are set in the Icewind Dale region, but in the canon timeline, the video game occurs before the tabletop adventure module. According to Dungeons & Dragons principal writer Chris Perkins: "We sat down with narrative designers for Dark Alliance, and we basically opened up a toy box, pulled out all the toys, and figured out how we were going to play with same toys. And so, there are places and foes and places that appear in Rime of the Frostmaiden that if you play Dark Alliance, see echoes of/similarities to. Each story is separate — the story of Rime of the Frost Maiden is completely separate from Dark Alliance, just using same locations. You get a sense of real history to this place [...]. Together, when you take the two things combined, you get bigger painting of Icewind Dale".

== Reception ==
Reception

Aggregate score
Aggregator	Score
Metacritic	PC: 53/100; PS5: 57/100; XSX: 58/100

Review scores
Publication	Score
Game Informer	6/10
IGN	4/10
PC Gamer (US)	82/100
PCGamesN	5/10
Push Square	7/10
RPGamer	2.5/5
RPGFan	72/100
Shacknews	7/10
VentureBeat	3/5

Dungeons & Dragons: Dark Alliance received "mixed or average reviews" according to review aggregator Metacritic. IGN's Travis Northup stated:

But in all my years, I've seldom seen anyone roll a critical failure quite like Dungeons & Dragons: Dark Alliance, which manages to take all that potential and turn it into a joyless labor that's mind-numbingly repetitive, deeply lacking in storytelling, and absolutely overflowing with bugs.

— Travis Northup, Dungeons & Dragons: Dark Alliance Review, IGN
