= Drizzt Do'Urden =

Fictional character from Dungeons & Dragons

- Forgotten Realms character
- Drizzt and his panther companion Guenhwyvar.
- First appearance: The Crystal Shard
- Created by: R. A. Salvatore

In-universe information
- Race: Drow
- Class: Fighter/Ranger
- Alignment: Chaotic good
- Significant other: Catti-brie
- Home: Menzoberranzan

Drizzt Do'Urden (/ˈdrɪtst doʊˈɜːrdɪn/) is a fictional character appearing in the Forgotten Realms campaign setting for the Dungeons & Dragons fantasy role-playing game. Drizzt was created by author R. A. Salvatore as a supporting character in the Icewind Dale Trilogy. Salvatore created him on a whim when his publisher needed him to replace one of the characters in an early version of the first book, The Crystal Shard. Drizzt has since become a popular heroic character of the Forgotten Realms setting, and has been featured as the main character of a long series of books, starting chronologically with The Dark Elf Trilogy. As an atypical drow (dark elf), Drizzt has forsaken both the evil ways of his people and their home in the Underdark, in the drow city of Menzoberranzan.

Drizzt's story is told in Salvatore's fantasy novels in The Icewind Dale Trilogy, The Dark Elf Trilogy, the Legacy of the Drow series, the Paths of Darkness series, The Hunter's Blades Trilogy, the Transitions series, and the Neverwinter Saga, as well as in the short stories "The Dowry", "Dark Mirror", and "Comrades at Odds". All of the novels featuring Drizzt have made The New York Times Best Seller list. A number of the novels have been adapted into graphic novels by Devil's Due Publishing. Drizzt has also been featured in D&D-based role-playing video games, including the Baldur's Gate series and Forgotten Realms: Demon Stone.

== Concept and creation ==
Drizzt Do'Urden's stories are set in the Forgotten Realms campaign setting for Dungeons & Dragons. The character has been a mainstay for author R. A. Salvatore, appearing in his novels for over 30 years. Drizzt is a drow who acts against the drow stereotype, favoring friendship and peace over hatred and violence. His unusual personality creates the conflict that allows Salvatore to create so many novels with stories about courage and friendship. Drizzt therefore fights the dark traits that are inherent in the drow.

Salvatore uses Drizzt to represent issues of racial prejudice, particularly in The Dark Elf Trilogy. For instance, Drizzt is concerned that if he and his love Cattie-Brie (a human) have children, their offspring will face hostility from both races. Drizzt is also troubled by the lifespan discrepancy between himself and Cattie-Brie.

Drizzt was created by happenstance. In 1987 R. A. Salvatore sent Mary Kirchoff, then managing editor of TSR's book department, a manuscript for what would become his 1990 novel Echoes of the Fourth Magic. She liked it, but asked if he could rewrite it to take place in the Forgotten Realms. She sent him Darkwalker on Moonshae by Douglas Niles, the only novel at the time set in the Forgotten Realms. Salvatore sent her a proposal for a sequel to Darkwalker, but Kirchoff sent back a large map of the Forgotten Realms and told him she wanted a new story set in a different part of the Realms. After two weeks of phone calls, Salvatore found a spot on the map that was not already designated for another project, and he located Icewind Dale there. According to Salvatore, the book was "set on the Moonshae Isles, because at the time I thought that was the Realms. When I found out how big the Realms were, I moved the story a thousand miles to the north."

Salvatore created Drizzt on the spur of the moment. He was under pressure to create a sidekick for Wulfgar in the Icewind Dale series. Salvatore had sent an early version of The Crystal Shard (what would become his first published novel) to TSR, and one day Kirchoff called him. She was on her way to a marketing meeting concerning the book, and informed him that they could not use one of the characters. He asked for time to think, but she was already late for the meeting. Off the top of his head, Salvatore said he had a Dark Elf. Kirchoff was skeptical, but Salvatore convinced her it would be fine because he was just a sidekick. She asked his name, and he replied Drizzt Do'Urden. She asked if he could spell it, and he said "not a chance". Recalling Drizzt's creation in an interview, Salvatore said, "I don't know where it came from. I guess that Gary Gygax just did such an amazing job in creating the drow elves that something about them got stuck in the back of my head. Thank God!" Although many readers have assumed that Drizzt is based on one of the many Dungeons & Dragons role-playing campaigns that the author has played, this is not the case. Salvatore's main influences were classical literature and works of J. R. R. Tolkien. "I like to think of Drizzt as a cross between Daryth from Darkwalker on Moonshae and Aragorn from The Lord of the Rings." Salvatore calls Drizzt "the classic romantic hero—misunderstood, holding to a code of ideals even when the going gets tough, and getting no appreciation for it most of the time."

== Publication history ==
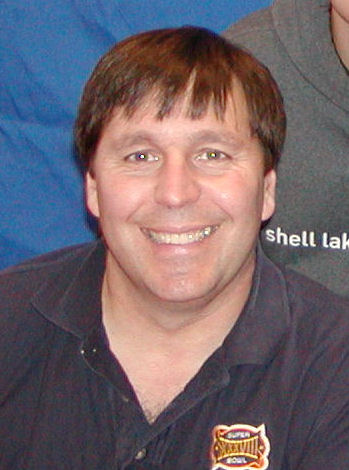
R. A. Salvatore

Drizzt's story begins in the novel Homeland, the start of The Dark Elf Trilogy and published in 1990 as a prequel to The Icewind Dale Trilogy, which was published between 1988 and 1990. In the book, Drizzt is born in Menzoberranzan as the third son to Matron Malice, the leader of House Do'Urden (a type of family akin to a Scottish clan). His father is Zaknafein, a weapons master who secretly hates drow society and teaches Drizzt his martial skills as he reinforces Drizzt's innate moral code. The 1996 short story "The Fires of Narbondel", in the Realms of the Underdark anthology, describes unrelated events involving Zaknafein as the main character, and a young Drizzt plays a supporting role.

During a raid against a group of surface elves, Drizzt finds himself unable to participate in the slaughter with his fellow drow. He pretends to kill an elf child, but actually helps her to escape. When the deception is discovered, Zaknafein is sacrificed in Drizzt's stead to appease Lolth, the drow's goddess. Following a war against another House, Drizzt curses his family and the evil drow ways and escapes Menzoberranzan into the Underdark. At this time he also acquires the statuette that allows him to summon the magical panther Guenhwyvar. Guenhwyvar travels by Drizzt's side as he makes his way across the Realms.

Drizzt fights off the resurrected spirit-wraith of his father in Exile, the second book in the Dark Elf Trilogy and also published in 1990. Sojourn picks up the story when Drizzt leaves the Underdark for the surface, where he meets a blind human ranger named Montolio Debrouchee. When Montolio begins teaching him the ways of the ranger, Drizzt realizes that, unknowingly, he had been following those very principles his entire life. From then on Drizzt's patron goddess is Mielikki, the Faerûnian goddess of the forest and of rangers. Montolio eventually dies, and Drizzt travels the Realms in search of a new home. He eventually finds himself in Icewind Dale where he meets dwarven king Bruenor Battlehammer, and Bruenor's adopted human daughter, Catti-brie.

The fourth book chronologically in the series, although the first published, is The Crystal Shard (1988), the first in The Icewind Dale Trilogy. It describes Drizzt's meeting with the barbarian Wulfgar and the halfling Regis, and their adventures as they stop Akar Kessel, a mage possessed by the sentient artifact Crenshinibon (the book's eponymous Crystal Shard), from gaining control of the region. Streams of Silver (1989), tells the story of the group as they journey to Mithral Hall, Bruenor's boyhood home. Artemis Entreri, a recurring character in the series, also makes his first appearance. In later books, Artemis is Drizzt's equal in combat, and they clash often due to their conflicting views and goals. In the 1990 book The Halfling's Gem, Artemis kidnaps Regis while in the employ of a powerful crime lord. Drizzt and Wulfgar chase the assassin by sea, with the help of Captain Deudermont, to recover Regis. Drizzt ends up in combat with Artemis Entreri, who leaves the battle wounded. At the end of the book the group finds Regis, and Guenhwyvar kills Artemis's employer.

Legacy of the Drow is a tetralogy, unlike the previous two trilogies. The 1993 short story, Dark Mirror, in the Realms of Valor anthology, describes events just prior to the series. The first three books, The Legacy, Starless Night, and Siege of Darkness, describe a drow attack on Mithril Hall. Wulfgar is seemingly slain by a yochlol, and Drizzt returns to Menzoberranzan to prevent his friends from being further attacked by dark elves. The drow launch a second attack against Mithril Hall during the Time of Troubles. It is eventually repelled and Drizzt returns to his friends.

Passage to Dawn, the final book in the Legacy of the Drow series and published two years after Siege of Darkness, picks up the story six years after the drow attack. Drizzt and Catti-Brie work with Captain Deudermont on his pirate-hunting ship, with the Companions of the Hall ultimately fighting the powerful demon Errtu who is aided by the Crystal Shard, which had previously been buried under a mountain of snow. Wulfgar, never truly dead, returns to life from the Abyss as the demon who had held his soul was destroyed.

Drizzt is the main character in only two books of the Paths of Darkness series. The Silent Blade (1998) describes the group's journey to permanently destroy the Crystal Shard. Sea of Swords (2001) continues Drizzt's story after the events of The Spine of the World (1999), which focuses on Wulfgar, and Servant of the Shard (2000), which has Artemis Entreri and Jarlaxle as the main characters. Sea of Swords covers the companions' search for Wulfgar's lost magical warhammer, Aegis-fang, and the reunion of the group after an extended separation.

Drizzt returns as the main character throughout The Hunter's Blades Trilogy. In The Thousand Orcs (2002), Drizzt and his friends encounter the powerful orc Obould Many-Arrows, who has employed frost giants to aid him in gaining control of the region. After a battle at the town of Shallows, Drizzt believes the other Companions of the Hall to have fallen in battle, and he sets off into the wilderness to fight all orcs in vengeance. The Lone Drow (2003) continues this storyline as the still-living Companions protect Mithril Hall from orc attacks without the aid of Drizzt. He is reunited with his friends in The Two Swords (2003).

R. A. Salvatore's next series of Forgotten Realms books, The Sellswords Trilogy, focus on the further adventures of Artemis Entreri and Jarlaxle, with Drizzt only being mentioned in them. However, Drizzt is once again the main character in the Transitions trilogy, consisting of The Orc King, The Pirate King, and The Ghost King. Drizzt is the main character, along with Bruenor, in R. A. Salvatore's next series in the Forgotten Realms, Neverwinter Saga; the first book in this series, Gauntlgrym, was released October 5, 2010. The second book in the series Neverwinter, was released October 4, 2011, with the third installment entitled Charon's Claw released August 7, 2012. The fourth book in the series "The Last Threshold", was released March 5, 2013.

== Other media ==
Drizzt Do'Urden has been featured in several accessories and one book for the Advanced Dungeons & Dragons fantasy role-playing game. The Hall of Heroes accessory for the second edition of Advanced Dungeons & Dragons, published in 1989, features a four-page description and game statistics for Drizzt and Guenhwyvar, written by R. A. Salvatore. The Heroes' Lorebook accessory, published in 1996 and written by Dale Donovan and Paul Culotta, features an update and revision of Drizzt's information from Hall of Heroes. The 1999 accessory Drizzt Do'Urden's Guide to the Underdark by Eric L. Boyd, details the cities and civilizations of Faerûn's Underdark through the perspective of the title character. The Forgotten Realms Campaign Setting hardcover for the game's third edition features a brief description and game statistics for Drizzt for this edition, under the section on the Sword Coast North.

Drizzt has also appeared in a number of graphic novels and video games, and as a miniature figure. Beginning in 2005, Devil's Due Publishing began releasing comic book adaptations of the Drizzt novels, covering each book in a three-issue mini-series along with a trade paperback collection. To date, Homeland, Exile, Sojourn, The Crystal Shard, Streams of Silver, The Halfling's Gem, The Legacy, and Starless Night have been released.

The character has appeared in several video games. He is part of the story and a party member in the 1994 PC game Menzoberranzan by SSI.

Drizzt appears in Baldur's Gate fighting some gnolls; it is possible for a skilled player to kill him or pickpocket his items, and a friendly or hostile version of Drizzt can be spawned with a cheat code. Drizzt also appears in the sequel Baldur's Gate II and will react negatively if the player has imported characters from the first game that killed Drizzt or has any of his unique items. He will also react negatively to any elven character with a low reputation with the same name, challenging them to a duel of honor. He is also an unlockable playable character in Baldur's Gate: Dark Alliance and Baldur's Gate: Dark Alliance II.

In Forgotten Realms: Demon Stone he is a playable character in the game's seventh stage, described by a writer for Imagine Games Network (IGN) as "cool but utterly ineffective."

Drizzt is also included in the Dungeons and Dragons Miniatures game, in the Legend of Drizzt Scenario Pack that also includes Wulfgar and the dragon Icingdeath. An enclosed booklet lets players recreate the battle between Drizzt, Wulfgar, and the dragon. The boxed set was nominated for Best Miniature Product at the 2008 ENnies.

A special adventure set in Icewind Dale was featured as the centerpiece at the November 3, 2007, Worldwide Dungeons and Dragons Game Day event, to commemorate the 20th anniversary of the debut of Drizzt that was upcoming.

Drizzt made a brief cameo in the 2011 one-off comic Unit:E, produced by Hasbro as a potential concept for crossing over many of the franchises they owned; he is seen in a splash page amongst many other Hasbro-owned characters (including characters from G.I. Joe, Transformers, M.A.S.K., Jem and the Holograms, Micronauts, Action Man, Battleship Galaxies, and even Candy Land), as summoned for Micronauts characters Biotron and Acroyear by the alien AI Synergy (a reimagined version of the AI from Jem).

Drizzt features prominently in the D&D Adventure System Cooperative Play board game The Legend of Drizzt, released October 18, 2011.

Drizzt has also been seen in the game Neverwinter by Cryptic Studios. He appears as part of the Neverwinter: Underdark expansion that allows players to travel to the drow city of Menzoberranzan and play several quests written by R. A. Salvatore.

In 2021, Drizzt was featured on two cards in the Adventures in the Forgotten Realms line from the Magic: The Gathering collectible card game. Sleep Sound (2021) is a poem by R. A. Salvatore which received an animated short to promote the "Summer Of Drizzt" marketing campaign. The short features scenes from the story of Drizzt; it was narrated by Benedict Cumberbatch and animated by The Sequence Group.

Drizzt appeared in the 2021 video game Dungeons & Dragons: Dark Alliance as one of the four playable characters along with his Companions.

== Reception and legacy ==
Salvatore mixes neatly choreographed battles with philosophical musings from self-styled "renegade soul" Drizzt, lending a little depth to an otherwise straightforward hack-and-slash adventure.

— Publishers Weekly review of The Orc King

According to PopMatters' Andrew Welsh, Drizzt is Salvatore's attempt to create a multifaceted character who faces internal struggles, in hopes of standing out from the drow, and fantasy fiction in general. Welsh feels that Salvatore fails in this regard, saying "any blood Drizzt finds on his hands is quickly justified and most 'internal' conflict is superficial at best." A review for Pyramid refers to Drizzt as the "most famous denizen" of Menzoberranzan, identifying him and the city as "some of the most famous pieces of the Realms", while chroniclers of the game Witwer et al. in the book Art & Arcana: A Visual History counted him among the "iconic D&D characters". Rob Bricken of Kotaku called Drizzt "one of the Mary Sue-iest characters in all of fiction".

In the Io9 series revisiting older Dungeons & Dragons novels, in his review of The Crystal Shard, Rob Bricken referred to Drizzt as "arguably the most famous and beloved D&D character of all time" and noted that Wizards of the Coast had finally begun combatting the stereotype of the drow as a "super-evil, subterranean race", which Drizzt forsakes "to become a noble Ranger on the surface world". Bricken noted that "Drizzt ends up overshadowing almost everyone and everything" but comments that "Drizzt and Wulfgar are so preternaturally badass they beat 25 giants by themselves (well, with help from Drizzt's magic panther Guenhwyvar, because of course he has a magic panther pal)". In his review of Homeland, Bricken explained that "when Salvatore introduced Drizzt in 1988's The Crystal Shard, players/readers who hadn't been bothered this by were forced to acknowledge the correlation because characters in the Forgotten Realms judged Drizzt by the color of his skin. He was distrusted, despised, and discriminated against, often even by those he helped."
