= Promise of the Witch-King =

2005 novel by R. A. Salvatore

Promise of the Witch King
- Author: R. A. Salvatore
- Language: English
- Series: The Sellswords
- Genre: Fantasy
- Publisher: Wizards of the Coast
- Publication date: 2005
- Publication place: United States
- Media type: Print
- Preceded by: Servant of the Shard
- Followed by: Road of the Patriarch

Promise of the Witch-King is book 2 of the Forgotten Realms trilogy The Sellswords. Book 1 was originally part of the Drizzt line of novels and was later re-released with some short stories making up for the gap in time.

The book details the adventures of Artemis Entreri the assassin and Jarlaxle the drow, formerly of House Baenre, with two new companions: the ghost of a powerful lich called the Witch-King, and an oath-bound knight.

== Plot summary ==
Leaving behind their past, Artemis Entreri and Jarlaxle Baenre become mercenaries in the lands of Damara and Vaasa where fame and glory await any who seek it. They are hired by two dragon sisters, Ilnezhara and Tazmikella, to uncover artifacts left behind by Zhengyi the Witch-King, a powerful lich who ruled the region for many years before falling to the power of King Gareth Dragonsbane and his allies. In search of adventure, glory, and treasure, the pair of unlikely heroes embarks on their mission to destroy, or retrieve, the remaining remnants of Zhengyi's power. In the village of Palishchuk, a half-orc woman, Arrayan Faylin, falls under the spell of the vanquished Zhengyi when she attempts to decipher a tome he left behind. The spell drains her life force to form an exact replica of Castle Perilous, the citadel from which the Witch-King once ruled. Jarlaxle and Entreri join forces with a group of adventurers, including Commander Ellery, a legendary hero Mariabronne the Rover, assassins Athrogate and Canthan, a half-elf warrior Calihye, and half-orcs Arrayan and Olgerkhan. The group aims to investigate the fortress Facsimile. After a battle against some monsters, Calihye's close friend, Parissus dies falling out of a wagon driven by Entreri. Blaming him for the woman's death, Calihye vows to kill him but has different thoughts after Entreri effortlessly disarms her and promises to kill her slowly if she ever threatens him again. As with the original Castle Perilous, the citadel's magic creates an endless supply of gargoyles, who begin to attack the heroes, as well as the poorly defended town of Palishchuk, where Calihye and another injured member of their party are nestled. Jarlaxle and company defeat the gargoyles easily enough and manage to infiltrate the castle, where they split up. Arrayan, having sustained too many wounds compounded with the life-draining burden of the spell, is on her last legs. The wizard Canthan turns on Entreri but proves to be overmatched by the dangerous assassin and is perfunctorily killed. In a rare moment of compassion, Entreri drags the dying body of Arrayan's lover, who is also sharing the burden of the castles dark magic, over to Canthan, and, as the wizard breathes his last breath, places the half-orc's hand upon his dagger to suck Canthan's remaining life force and heal her. An isolated Mariabronne stumbles upon a chamber with demon eggs hanging from the ceiling. The eggs hatch and Mariabronne manages to defeat them, but is stung in the process and injected with deadly venom. Commander Ellery is left alone with Jarlaxle and attempts to assassinate him. A fight promptly ensues, although Jarlaxle seems reluctant to kill her, as they have been lovers for some time and the opportunistic mercenary would always prefer to bed women than slay them, but Entreri shows up and mortally wounds her with his jeweled dagger. When the remnants of the band reunite, Athrogate takes it upon himself to do what Canthan could not and proceeds to duel against Entreri. Despite all his considerable skill, Entreri's parry and thrust style of fighting is no match for Athrogate's deadly morningstars. He would have promptly been killed but for Jarlaxle, who tosses a dimensional hole concealed in his hat at the dwarf. Athrogate becomes imprisoned in a void and agrees to obey Jarlaxle in return for his freedom. The five remaining companions venture into the heart of the castle, where they are met by a powerful dracolich who served as a minion for Zhengyi. Seemingly unstoppable, the dracolich gives the heroes a hellacious fight, but is finally defeated when Entreri's enchanted dragon statue spews dragon flame upon it. Jarlaxle, never one to pass up powerful magic, quickly salvages the soul of the dracolich, contained in a skull pendant, as well as a magical figurine for summoning a nightmare steed off Mariabronne's corpse.

== Reception ==
A reviewer from Publishers Weekly comments: "Salvatore keeps the action hopping as the duo use every trick in their repertoire to achieve their goal—finding magical treasure hidden by the long-dead Witch-King. Lovers of all things elvish, especially those who like butt-kicking swordplay, dastardly intrigues and ingenious hocus-pocus, will relish this fantasy."

Kirkus Reviews states "A formulaic, trite and derivative swords-and-sorcery fantasy that reads like a novelized Dungeons & Dragons adventure."

Pat Ferrara from mania.com comments: "The second book of arguably the coolest Forgotten Realms literary spin-off to date, Promise of the Witch-King continues the Sellswords Series without skipping a beat. Tightly knit plotlines, absurd yet memorable and engaging characters, and hellishly fast-paced storytelling culminate in a wild melee of swords and sorcery led by the master himself."

Promise of the Witch King reached 15 on the New York Times bestseller list on November 13, 2005.

== Reviews ==
- Science Fiction Chronicle
