= The Pirate King =

2008 novel by R. A. Salvatore

- Cover of the first edition
- Author: R. A. Salvatore
- Cover artist: Todd Lockwood
- Language: English
- Series: Transitions
- Genre: Fantasy novel
- Publisher: Wizards of the Coast
- Publication date: October 7, 2008
- Publication place: United States
- Media type: Print (Hardback)
- Pages: 347
- ISBN: 978-0-7869-4964-9
- Preceded by: The Orc King
- Followed by: The Ghost King

The Pirate King (2008) is the second book in the Transitions series, written by R. A. Salvatore.

== Plot summary ==
The Arcane Brotherhood has long held the city of Luskan in their power, but when corruption eats away at their ranks, Captain Deudermont comes to the rescue of a city that has become a safe haven for the Sword Coast's most dangerous pirates. But rescuing a city from itself may not be as easy as Deudermont thinks, and when Drizzt cannot talk him out of it, he will be forced to help.

The story begins with Captain Deudermont and the Sea Sprite crew still fighting pirates. One of the captured pirates raises questions of the effectiveness of Deudermont's actions, suggesting that Deudermont is allowed to capture pirates purely as a show and then stating that the Arklem Greeth, a lich who controls the Hosttower in the city of Luskan, supports the pirate trade. On Deudermont's return to Waterdeep, he meets with Lord Brambleberry of Waterdeep, and the two of them decide to stop Arklem Greeth and his pirate crews.

Meanwhile, Drizzt and Regis decide to travel to Icewind Dale to learn the fate of Wulfgar. Their path leads them to Longsaddle, home of the Harpell family. During their visit, a philosophical debate ensues about crime and whether the 'greater good' justifies the use of severe punishment. Drizzt and Regis leave Longsaddle and head for Luskan, where they meet with captain Deudermont and learn of his plan. They decide to help in the fight.

The task of saving Luskan is presented as moral conflict between trying to better the city at the risk of destroying it or accepting stability under less morally pure rule. After a few battles that tear the city apart, Arklem Greeth blows up the Hosttower, killing a large percentage of Luskan's population.

With the war apparently over, Drizzt and Regis continue on their path to Icewind Dale. There they find Wulfgar living in a cave invaded by a carefree Drizzt and Wulfgar many years ago, testing himself against the harsh seasons before he plans to return to his people.

Back in Luskan, while Deudermont tries to rebuild the city and keep the people of Luskan safe and fed, the High Captains work against Deudermont, hoping to turn the people of Luskan against him and assume the position of rulers. Eventually, civil war breaks out in Luskan. Drizzt and Regis return to help. The final battle sees the death of Deudermont, the sinking of the Sea Sprite, and the return of the rule of the High Captains in Luskan. Drizzt and Regis leave the city with the rest of Deudermont's crew.

== Reception ==
The Pirate King reached 8 on The New York Times bestseller list on November 2, 2008.
