= Spine of the World =

Spine of the World may refer to:

- Spine of the World (Forgotten Realms), a mountain range in the Forgotten Realms setting
  - The Spine of the World, a novel in the Paths of Darkness series by R. A. Salvatore
