= Icewind Dale: Rime of the Frostmaiden =

D&D 5e adventure module

- Rules required: Dungeons & Dragons, 5th edition
- Character levels: 1-12
- Campaign setting: Forgotten Realms
- Authors: Chris Perkins, Stacey Allan, Bill Benham, H.H. Carlan, Celeste Conowitch, Dan Dillon, Will Doyle, Mikayla Ebel, Anne Gregersen, Chad Quandt, Morrigan Robbins, Ashley Warren
- First published: September 15, 2020
- Pages: 320
- ISBN: 978-0-7869-6698-1

Icewind Dale: Rime of the Frostmaiden is an adventure module with themes of survival, horror and fantasy for the 5th edition of the Dungeons & Dragons fantasy role-playing game.

== Summary ==
The adventure module is set in the Icewind Dale region of the Forgotten Realms with a focus on the Ten-Towns and the surrounding area. It takes place more than a century after the events of R.A. Salvatore's Icewind Dale Trilogy circa winter of 1489 DR or later. After The Sundering, the lesser deity Auril the Frostmaiden "returned to Icewind Dale to plunge it into darkness" and "everlasting winter".

The campaign has two entry points — the first set at level one in the Ten-Towns region and the second set at levels four to six with a focus on transitioning from elsewhere in the Forgotten Realms to Icewind Dale. "The story opens with a series of human stories and struggles before opening up to more powerful cosmic threats". This adventure module is designed to take player characters from 1st level to 12th level. The story has multiple potential endings, both good and bad, based on the choices the players make throughout the adventure.

== Publication history ==
The new module was officially announced on June 18, 2020, during the annual D&D Live livestream event; however, the title and cover leaked the week before the announcement when D&D Beyond posted a promotional video that was immediately taken down from YouTube. An alternate art cover edition, designed by the artist Hydro74, of the book is only available through local game stores.

Beadle & Grimm, a Wizards of the Coast licensee, released two limited run special editions of Icewind Dale: Rime of the Frostmaiden – the "Platinum Edition" at $500 MSRP and the "Silver Edition" at $175 MSRP. It was also released as a digital product through the following Wizards of the Coast licensees: D&D Beyond, Fantasy Grounds, and Roll20.

On the book's development, Dungeons & Dragons principal writer Chris Perkins said, "Unlike gothic horror, this story focuses more on mind horror. [...] When your setting is a cold, dark, isolated place, the horror comes easily. I was struck by the fact that our previous excursions to Icewind Dale didn't really lean in that direction, so here was a chance to show Icewind Dale in a different light. [...] We weren't planning to return to Icewind Dale so soon, but as Dark Alliance began to crystallize, we realized that there were interesting new stories we could tell in this setting. [...] Certain books are more likely to tap into nostalgia and revisit old settings than others. We also know that we're gaining tons of new fans who aren't familiar with our settings. To them, it's all new".

== Related products ==
=== Comics ===
A corresponding four issue comic mini-series, entitled Dungeons & Dragons: At the Spine of the World, began in November 2020 and was published by IDW Publishing. It was written by AJ Mendez and Aimee Garcia with art by Martin Coccolo and colors by Katrina Mae Hao.

=== Miniatures ===
As part of their Icons of the Realm line, Wizards of the Coast licensee WizKids released 45 pre-painted miniatures that correspond with the adventure including an Abominable Yeti and Auril the Frostmaiden. They also released a separate premium miniature of the ancient white dragon Arveiaturace. CBR highlighted that while these miniatures "are perfect for any winter campaigns, people should consider whether the specific set of minis they are buying meet their needs" since "many are unique to the RotF book or a wintry setting and thus lack the same versatility as the Waterdeep minis".

=== Video games ===
Both Icewind Dale: Rime of the Frostmaiden and the third-person action role-playing game Dungeons & Dragons: Dark Alliance are set in the Icewind Dale region; however, in the canon timeline the video game occurs before the adventure module. Chris Perkins said, "we sat down with narrative designers for Dark Alliance, and we basically opened up a toy box, pulled out all the toys, and figured out how we were going to play with same toys. And so, there are places and foes and places that appear in Rime of the Frostmaiden that if you play Dark Alliance, see echoes of/similarities to. Each story is separate — the story of Rime of the Frost Maiden is completely separate from Dark Alliance, just using same locations. You get a sense of real history to this place [...]. Together, when you take the two things combined, you get bigger painting of Icewind Dale".

When asked "if it's important for the design team to create campaigns that go along with video games," Perkins responded, "It's more important to some folks than others. On the one hand, it fosters unity between Wizards and its outside partners, and that unity gives fans a chance to experience our campaigns across multiple platforms. On the other hand, it's a bit like putting all our eggs in one basket. What's important to me is that the collaboration works and is handled thoughtfully, and that no one feels creatively hamstrung by the parallel development".

== Reception ==
In Publishers Weekly's "Best-selling Books Week Ending September 23, 2020", Icewind Dale: Rime of the Frostmaiden was #12 in "Hardcover Nonfiction" and sold 15,785 units. In USA Today's "Best-Selling Books List for September 24, 2020", Icewind Dale: Rime of the Frostmaiden was #24. According to D&D Beyond, the book was its 7th top-seller on Cyber Monday 2020.

Icewind Dale: Rime of the Frostmaiden was #2 on CBR's 2020 "Dungeons & Dragons: 10 Greatest 5e Adventures, Ranked" list — the article states that "writers have likened the early chapters of Icewind Dale to desolate horror films such as The Thing and The Shining. The tone may be dark at times, but many wonderful foes, delightful encounters and wild surprises await".

Charlie Hall, for Polygon, highlighted that "this book throws virtually everything in the D&D arsenal at its players. Even experienced Dungeon Masters will have a tough time keeping up. [...] [The adventure] takes so many bizarre twists and turns that I had a hard time keeping up from page to page. It's a wonderful read, even if you're not planning on running the adventure at all. [...] The adventure also contains multiple branching decision points. [...] Best of all, Rime of the Frostmaiden includes multiple endings". In Hall's separate review of the Platinum Edition, he wrote, "they took the entire 320-page adventure and broke it down into six slim paperback volumes — one each for the game's major chapters, plus an appendix [...]. What surprised me most was the number and quality of the physical maps included in this Platinum Edition. [...] Beyond that, there are also at least 15 other paper handouts — everything from hand-written letters and in-fiction zines to scrolls and other oddball ephemera. [...] It's full to bursting with more things that will enhance the tabletop experience than I have the time or ability to make myself. Stack it all up — especially the gigantic maps and the jewelry — and I think that fans definitely get their money's worth. For a campaign that will take most groups the better part of a year to finish, the $500 price tag actually seems reasonable".

Christian Hoffer, for ComicBook.com, wrote, "The biggest innovation in Rime of the Frostmaiden is how the adventure itself flows. [...] The key to Rime of the Frostmaiden is that many of the storylines can either be used as the focus of the whole campaign, played individually, or removed without much consequence to the overall story. [...] The book also continues the good practices started in other adventures, such as providing multiple endings based on the decisions made over the course of the campaign. Icewind Dale: Rime of the Frostmaiden is the strongest campaign book released by Wizards of the Coast since Curse of Strahd". Hoffer also highlighted that there are "more than a few nods to various horror movies and other pop culture cameos. In addition to a fantasy recreation of The Thing, there are homages to Alien, The Shining, and At the Mountains of Madness that players might pick up on. There's even a reference to the frozen corpses that dot Mount Everest that serves as grim landmarks to those making the climb".

Scott Baird, for Screen Rant, highlighted that the book is structured for minimal preparation time on the part of the Dungeon Master; Baird wrote, "the adventure moves on to quests further out in Icewind Dale, and each part is written to make it as easy as possible for DMs to digest all of the information in as short a time as possible. Rime of the Frostmaiden might lack the mega-dungeon of Tomb of Annihilation, but in terms of prep time, it can't be beaten. The short prep time of Rime of the Frostmaiden is also ideal for new DMs who are still learning the ropes and want to focus more on managing each session as they come. The segmented nature of the campaign means that each individual adventure is easy to take out and use in different settings or homebrew worlds, for those DMs who require one-off games to try and teach new players, or need an adventure when running games at conventions".
