= The Two Swords =

2004 novel by R. A. Salvatore

- Cover of the first edition
- Author: R. A. Salvatore
- Language: English
- Genre: Fantasy
- Published: 2004
- Publication place: United States
- Media type: Print (Paperback)
- Preceded by: The Lone Drow

The Two Swords is a fantasy novel by American writer R. A. Salvatore, the third and final book in his series The Hunter's Blades Trilogy. The Two Swords was his 17th work concerning one of the most famous characters Salvatore has created, the drow, or dark elf, Drizzt Do'Urden. It follows The Thousand Orcs and The Lone Drow.

== Plot summary ==
In The Two Swords, Obould's horde has pressed the Companions to the very gates of Mithral Hall, where Bruenor and his clan launch a desperate, last-ditch effort to push the orcs back. A desperate rescue attempt succeeds, with Drizzt and Innovindil rescuing the latter's pegasus, which Obould had captured and chained as a trophy, and Drizzt is unexpectedly reunited with the Companions that he long thought dead. The only major plot line to be tied up in this novel is the question of what Drizzt will do about his relationship with Catti-brie.

Other than that, The Two Swords resolves a few minor plot threads. Drizzt and the surface elf Innovindil bring their quest for the captured pegasus to a conclusion. A few more characters meet their demise in this novel. Ultimately, the novel keeps the major plot lines active for future novels, and introduces several more.

== Reception ==
The Two Swords reached No. 5 on The Washington Post's bestseller list for the week ending October 24, 2004. It debuted and peaked on The New York Times bestseller list at No. 4, and reached at No. 1 on The Wall Street Journal Bestseller List in early November after only two weeks, a record for its publisher Wizards of the Coast. Patrick Bergeron II from fantasybookspot.com found The Two Swords predictable, anticipating key sequences such as the character Drizzt "finding out that his friends had not fallen at Shallows." However, he still enjoyed the story and characterization.

== Review ==
- Chronicle
