= The Legacy (Salvatore novel) =

1992 novel by R. A. Salvatore

- Cover of the first edition
- Author: R. A. Salvatore
- Language: English
- Series: Legacy of the Drow
- Genre: Fantasy literature
- Published: 1992
- Publication place: United States
- Media type: Print (Paperback)
- Followed by: Starless Night

The Legacy is a 1992 fantasy novel by American writer R. A. Salvatore. It is the first book in his series Legacy of the Drow.

== Plot summary ==
The Legacy continues the plot-line of The Icewind Dale Trilogy, with Wulfgar and Catti-brie preparing for their marriage and Drizzt returning from the first of many visits to Lady Alustriel of Silverymoon. Drizzt returns to a disturbed Catti-brie and eccentric Regis, who has returned to Mithral Hall after a stint as master of Pasha Pook's thieves' guild. While Bruenor plans the wedding, Wulfgar's tribe settles the appropriately named Settlestone and begins to prosper. Wulfgar, on the other hand, is straining his relationship with Catti-brie, who feels his possessiveness is excessive and unwise. When Wulfgar unexpectedly attacks Drizzt and appears to have lethal motives, the tension builds, despite the drow defusing the situation.

Newly introduced is the dwarf battlerager, Thibbledorf Pwent. The dwarf, knocked unconscious during the invasion of Mithral Hall, pledges fealty to Bruenor. Among his personality quirks are a disgusting smell, and ungreased, ridged armor, which also serves as Pwent's primary weapon. Meanwhile, in Menzoberranzan, Drizzt's sister Vierna (Taken in by Matron Baenre after the fall of House Do'Urden) is preparing to recapture her brother. Vierna believes that this quest, if successful, will gain her the full favor of Lolth, the chief drow goddess. Vierna enlists the help of Bregan D'aerthe, the most prominent mercenary band in Menzoberranzan. Jarlaxle, Bregan D'aerthe's leader, briefly doubts Vierna's sanity and designs, but is convinced when Vierna turns her brother Dinin into a drider.

The story returns to Mithral Hall, with Bruenor preparing a detachment to investigate a goblin disturbance in Mithral Hall's unexplored lower tunnels. After the goblins are routed, tension builds between Wulfgar and Catti-brie. Wulfgar had wanted his fiancée to stay out of the fight, for reasons that didn't satisfy the woman. A patrol goes missing soon afterward, and Drizzt prepares to investigate. Oddly, Bruenor suggests that Regis accompany the drow. Drizzt, with a few second thoughts, allows the halfling to join him. The pair discover the patrol, slaughtered; Drizzt identifies the murderers as dark elves and leads a pursuit. After the battle with the drow, Drizzt questions Regis on his new-found combat abilities, and discovers that the halfling is actually Artemis Entreri, wearing a familiar magical mask. Drizzt had previously used the item to pass as a surface elf, and had not realized its capabilities. Entreri then turns Drizzt over to the dark elves, who escape to the Underdark.

Entreri then challenges Drizzt, attempting to settle their feud from The Halfling's Gem. Apparently, this was Entreri's price in the operation to recover the wayward drow. The assassin is informed that he cannot kill Drizzt in the duel, because Vierna intends to sacrifice her brother to Lolth. Meanwhile, Bruenor and Wulfgar realize Regis' deception and manipulation: Bruenor was charmed to allow Regis to follow the ranger on his expedition; and Wulfgar was persuaded that Drizzt had kissed Catti-brie. Catti-brie, Bruenor, and Wulfgar, together with Cobble (Mithral Hall's High Priest) and Pwent, move to rescue Drizzt.

The duel between Drizzt and Entreri begins slowly, Drizzt not wanting to give the assassin satisfaction. Entreri counters by successfully taunting the drow with the whereabouts and well-being of Regis. Jarlaxle and Vierna are impressed with the battle, allowing it to continue until Wulfgar and company arrive. In the meleé, Vierna crushes Cobble beneath a steel wall and Drizzt escapes, but violates his vow to never take a dark elf's life. The moral struggle inherently ends with a repudiation of the vow, if necessary to save the lives of those for whom Drizzt cares. Bruenor and his entourage also escape, and Entreri asks for an opportunity to pursue his nemesis. He kills his appointed escorts when alone and fails to find a hidden Drizzt. Drizzt's friends are also searching for him, as are Vierna and Bregan D'aerthe.

The parties of Bruenor and Vierna collide, with another raucous combat. Bruenor attacks the Drider Dinin. Pwent is separated from the group, falling down a pit after overcoming dark elf poison. Vierna summons a Yochlol, a demonic handmaiden of Lolth, which attacks Wulfgar, then wraps a tentacle around Cattie-brie's leg. Wulfgar, desperate, repeatedly strikes the chambers ceiling with his hammer, causing a collapse that kills both Wulfgar and the Yochlol.

== Reception ==
The Legacy, TSR's first hardcover novel, leapt to the top of The New York Times bestseller list within weeks of its release.

The Legacy debuted on the New York Times bestseller list at number 9.
