= The Hunter's Blades Trilogy =

Novel trilogy by R.A. Salvatore

- The cover of The Thousand Orcs
- The Thousand Orcs; The Lone Drow; The Two Swords
- Author: R.A. Salvatore
- Country: United States
- Language: English
- Genre: Fantasy
- Published: 2002–2004
- Media type: Print
- No. of books: 3
- Preceded by: Paths of Darkness, The Sellswords
- Followed by: Transitions

The Hunter's Blades Trilogy is a fantasy trilogy by American writer R.A. Salvatore. It follows the Paths of Darkness series and is composed of three books: The Thousand Orcs, The Lone Drow, and The Two Swords. The Two Swords was Salvatore's 17th work concerning one of his most famous characters, Drizzt Do'Urden. In this series, Drizzt tries to stop an orc king from spreading chaos and war. The series reached The New York Times Best Seller list and is followed by the installments of the Transitions series.

== Series titles ==
1. The Thousand Orcs (2002)
2. The Lone Drow (2003)
3. The Two Swords (2004)

== Characters ==
- Drizzt Do'Urden
- Catti-brie
- Bruenor Battlehammer
- Wulfgar
- Regis

== Reception ==
The Thousand Orcs debuted on The New York Times Best Seller list at number 11. Reviews were generally positive. Publishers Weekly described it as a "rousing tale of derring-do and harrowing escapes", although in doing so they acknowledged that it was a "light-hearted sword and sorcery novel" which gained some depth through Drizzt's philosophical ponderings about human frailties. Similarly, Paul Brink, writing for the School Library Journal, acknowledged the author's use of Drizzt to "reflect on issues of racial prejudice".

The Lone Drow debuted on The New York Times Best Seller list at number 7. Staff Reviewer Tom Gafkjen from d20zines.com awarded the book a "B" grade. He praised the well-written combat sequences (a point that was also acknowledged by Jackie Cassada when she commented on the first novel in the series) but he did not enjoy the repetitious writing about the character Drizzt brooding over the death of a moon elf. He noted the exceptional writing although preferring the first book of the trilogy. A similarly mixed review came from Publishers Weekly – while mostly negative, the reviewers acknowledged that the novel did (occasionally) rise above the cliché, and that "a few characters do achieve some complexity". Cassada, on the other hand, seemed taken by the second novel in the trilogy, praising the "tense battles, vivid landscapes and memorable characters". The Lone Drow debuted at #7 on the New York Times Best Seller list in October 2003. Publishers Weekly felt that The Lone Drow was clichéd, but that some of the characters did achieve "some complexity". They singled out two characters for praise: Innovindel, an elf who talks "pensively" of her long life in contrast to the short lived humans, and Obould the orc king.

The Two Swords reached No. 5 on The Washington Post's Bestseller List for the week ending October 24, 2004. It debuted on The New York Times Best Seller list at No. 4 and at No. 1 on The Wall Street Journal best seller list in early November. Patrick Bergeron II from fantasybookspot.com found The Two Swords predictable and expected key sequences such as the character Drizzt "finding out that his friends had not fallen at Shallows". However he still enjoyed the story and characterization. The Two Swords peaked at #4 on The New York Times Best Seller list in 2004. It reached the top of the Wall Street Journal's hardcover bestseller list after only two weeks, a record for its publisher Wizards of the Coast. It also debuted at #4 on The New York Times's bestseller list, and #2 on Publishers Weekly bestseller list.

James Voelpel from mania.com commented on The Thousand Orcs, calling it:

"'a welcome return to the beginnings of Salvatore's fantasy writing, though it seems to be lacking in some respects. All the characters that fans have been clamoring for are here but the sheer number of secondary stories and characters sometimes drowns them out. Even the would be love affair between Catti-brie and Drizzt seems underdone and somewhat glossed over. Characters such as Bruenor, Wulfgar and Regis are almost afterthoughts with some development to their personalities seemingly tacked on. The plot itself is rock solid and the story points with Obould and Gerti's alliance as well as the rift between the dwarves and humans in Mirabar are really well done. Salvatore is always noted for his ability to write action that you can picture and he doesn't disappoint here. The battles are stupendously done and vividly portray a comic book feel to them. For then fans of Salvatore this is a welcome edition to the Drizzt legacy, albeit lacking a bit, soon enough it will rocket up the bestseller list and have its following clamoring for the follow ups.'"

== Publication history ==
Title	Author	ISBN	Publisher	US release date
The Thousand Orcs	R.A. Salvatore	ISBN 978-0-7869-2980-1	Wizards of the Coast	October 2002
The Lone Drow	R.A. Salvatore	ISBN 978-0-7869-3228-3	Wizards of the Coast	October 2003
The Two Swords	R.A. Salvatore	ISBN 978-0-7869-3790-5	Wizards of the Coast	October 2004
The Hunters Blades Trilogy – Collectors Edition (Hardcover)	R.A. Salvatore	ISBN 978-0-7869-4315-9	Wizards of the Coast	January 2007

The first printing of The Thousand Orcs was 200,000 copies.
