= Siege of Darkness =

1994 novel by R. A. Salvatore

- Cover of the first edition
- Author: R. A. Salvatore
- Language: English
- Series: Legacy of the Drow
- Genre: Fantasy literature
- Published: 1994
- Publication place: United States
- Media type: Print (Paperback)
- Preceded by: Starless Night
- Followed by: Passage to Dawn

Siege of Darkness is a 1994 fantasy novel by American writer R. A. Salvatore. It is the third book in his Legacy of the Drow series.

== Plot summary ==
Siege of Darkness tells the story of how the Time of Troubles, in which all magic is temporarily disrupted and many gods and goddesses are forced to take the forms of their avatars and walk the material plane, affects the drow and Drizzt and company. The Spider Queen, Lolth, plots to keep Matron Baenre in power and to ultimately take Mithral Hall. In-house fighting results in the destruction of the 3rd house, House Oblodra, with the exception of their kobold/ goblin army, and the 4th house, House Faen Tlabbar, being left leaderless. Matron Baenre, along with the favor of Lolth, forms a loose house alliance to attack Mithral Hall. Realizing that they cannot possibly stop a drow army, the svirfnebli, the deep gnomes, are forced to abandon Blingdenstone. The battle for Mithral Hall takes place on the surface as well as in the Underdark. The drow were defeated with a little help from an unlikely source, the balor, Errtu. Through trickery, all Baenre wizardry and spells are temporarily interrupted and the heroes take advantage of the opening, killing Matron Baenre and defeating the drow offensive. Lolth's plan all along was to bring about chaos and to rid herself of Matron Baenre.

== Reception ==
Siege of Darkness debuted on The New York Times bestseller list at number 13.
