= Worldwide Dungeons & Dragons Game Day =

Worldwide Dungeons & Dragons game day is a promotional event for the Dungeons & Dragons role playing game. Game stores in over 40 countries host games throughout the day, including a special free adventure with pre-generated characters from Wizards of the Coast.

An adventure set in Icewind Dale was featured as the centerpiece at the 3 November 2007 Game Day event, to commemorate the 20th anniversary of Drizzt Do'Urden.

Game Day 2008 centered on the launch of D&D 4th Edition.

Three Game Days were held in 2009 to coincide with the release of expansions of the 4th Edition rules. Including:

- Players Handbook 2, held on March 21
- Monster Manual 2, held on May 23
- Dungeon Masters Guide 2, held on September 19
