= The Silent Blade =

1998 novel by R. A. Salvatore

- Cover of the first edition
- Author: R. A. Salvatore
- Cover artist: Todd Lockwood
- Language: English
- Series: Paths of Darkness
- Genre: Fantasy novel
- Publication place: United States
- Media type: Print (Paperback) (Hardcover)
- Followed by: The Spine of the World

The Silent Blade is the first book of the Legend of Drizzt series Paths of Darkness. It is the eleventh book in the ever expanding Legend of Drizzt series and is followed by The Spine of the World which came out the next year. It was released in June 1998 from TSR and then later from Wizards of the Coast.

== Publication history ==
The Silent Blade was written by R. A. Salvatore. It was republished in February 2009 as the eleventh book in the Legend of Drizzt series.

Todd Lockwood painted the cover for Silent Blade.

== Plot ==
In The Silent Blade, Wulfgar, a mighty barbarian, tries to come to terms with his freedom from the Abyss, from the torturous clutches of the balor Errtu and fails, fleeing from his friends to the port city of Luskan. Confused and angry, he finds a job in The Cutlass, a local tavern, as a bouncer in return for a room and alcohol, which he has become dependent on to dull the pain of his six-year-long entrapment in the Abyss. Many miles to the south Artemis Entreri returns to his hometown of Calimport, only to find that a lot of things have changed in his old thieves guild... and many more will change if he and his new drow sponsors have anything to do with it. Meanwhile, Regis finds that many evil and wicked beings are seemingly enchanted by his ruby; which had belonged to Pasha Pook. The truth is that one of his "friends", a giant, is following him because of The Call of Crenshinibon. Drizzt himself travels with the rest of his friends to see Cadderly Bonaduce who has said he will attempt to use his powers as the chosen of Deneir to destroy Crenshinibon. Drizzt and company are duped by Jarlaxle and his lieutenants who impersonate Cadderly and take the crystal shard for themselves.

== Reception ==
The Silent Blade debuted on The New York Times bestseller list at No. 32. A reviewer in Publishers Weekly commented: "among devotees of Forgotten Realms, it will generate eagerness and enthusiasm."

The Silent Blade won the Origins Awards for Best Game-Related Novel of 1998.

== Reviews ==
- Review by Don D'Ammassa (1998) in Science Fiction Chronicle, #199 Oct-November 1998
