= The Sellswords =

Trilogy of fantasy novels

- Servant of the Shard; Promise of the Witch-King; Road of the Patriarch
- Author: R. A. Salvatore
- Country: United States
- Language: English
- Genre: Epic fantasy
- Publisher: Wizards of the Coast
- Published: 2000 - 2006
- Media type: Print
- No. of books: 3
- Preceded by: Paths of Darkness
- Followed by: Transitions

The Sellswords is a trilogy of fantasy novels written by R. A. Salvatore, whose related works include The Legend of Drizzt series and The Hunter's Blades Trilogy. It contains three books, Servant of the Shard (also the third book in the Paths of Darkness quartet, which was later published as books 11 through 14 of The Legend of Drizzt), Promise of the Witch-King, and Road of the Patriarch.

== Plot ==
The trilogy continues the tale of the infamous assassin, Artemis Entreri (previously featured in books as Drizzt Do'Urden's self-proclaimed archenemy), and the cunning drow mercenary, Jarlaxle (previously relevant as the leader of Bregan D'aerthe, an outlaw group of drow based primarily in and around Menzoberranzan that does business mostly with the drow of Menzoberranzan). Continuing the story of Artemis and Jarlaxle told in the Paths of Darkness series, Artemis and Jarlaxle begin an adventure that tests their skills, their minds, and their souls.

While the two characters are antagonists in the Drizzt Do'Urden series, they are the main characters in The Sellswords trilogy, which are some of the few books in Salvatore's Forgotten Realms novels that do not focus on the legendary drow warrior, Drizzt Do'Urden, as the hero of the novel. The Sellswords develops the two characters more deeply than was possible in the other Salvatore books, giving the reader an in-depth view of the mind of the cold, calculating Artemis Entreri and the ambitious, opportunistic Jarlaxle.

== Works included ==
1. Servant of the Shard (2000)
2. Promise of the Witch-King (2005)
3. Road of the Patriarch (2006)

== Reception ==
Pat Ferrara of mania.com comments: "The second book of arguably the coolest Forgotten Realms literary spin-off to date, Promise of the Witch-King continues the Sellswords Series without skipping a beat. Tightly knit plotlines, absurd yet memorable and engaging characters, and hellishly fast-paced storytelling culminate in a wild melee of swords and sorcery led by the master himself."

The audio recording of Road of the Patriarch received a favorable review from California Bookwatch, which praised all aspects of the novel, including the plot, the action, and the narration by David Colacci.

The Sellswords appeared on the 2024 Game Rant "31 Best Dungeons & Dragons Novels, Ranked" list at #4.
