= Servant of the Shard =

2000 novel by R.A. Salvatore

- Author: R.A. Salvatore
- Language: English
- Series: Paths of Darkness, The Sellswords
- Genre: Fantasy
- Publisher: Wizards of the Coast
- Publication place: United States
- Media type: Print
- Preceded by: The Spine of the World
- Followed by: Sea of Swords; Promise of the Witch-King

Servant of the Shard was originally the third book in R.A. Salvatore's Paths of Darkness book series. It was also made the first book of the trilogy The Sellswords. In this novel, Artemis Entreri acquires Charon's Claw.

== Plot summary ==
After regaining his confidence and will to live (lost in Paths of Darkness, when Drizzt Do'Urden seemed to have died without being defeated fairly by Artemis, thus apparently taking from him the ability to prove to himself that he was a better fighter), Artemis Entreri finds himself allied with the mercenary Jarlaxle as the drow's tie to the surface world. Caught in the plans of Jarlaxle's band, Bregan D'aerthe, Artemis finds himself back in Calimport, the city in which he became known as one of the greatest assassins in Faerûn. Without many ties to the city after spending his time in captivity to the drow, Entreri must once again make his name known while trying to survive against the guilds of Calimport and Jarlaxle's lieutenants, Berg'inyon Baenre, Raiguy Bondalek, and Kimmuriel Oblodra. At the same time Jarlaxle succumbs to the mental intrusions of the crystal shard, Crenshinibon, as it pushes Jarlaxle to fulfill his unending ambitions.

== Reception ==
Servant of the Shard reached 14 on The New York Times bestseller list on November 19, 2000.
