= Transitions (novel series) =

Series of fantasy novels by R. A. Salvatore

- The Orc King; The Pirate King; The Ghost King
- Author: R. A. Salvatore
- Country: United States
- Language: English
- Genre: Epic fantasy
- Publisher: Wizards of the Coast
- Published: 2007 - 2009
- Media type: Print
- No. of books: 3
- Preceded by: The Hunter's Blades Trilogy, The Sellswords
- Followed by: Neverwinter Saga

Transitions is a series of fantasy novels by R. A. Salvatore, the famous science fiction and fantasy author, consisting of three novels: The Orc King, The Pirate King, and The Ghost King. It continues the tale of the famous renegade drow (dark elf) Drizzt Do'Urden and his friends. This series is a follow-up to The Hunter's Blades Trilogy. Like the rest of the saga, it is set in the Forgotten Realms, a popular Dungeons & Dragons role-playing setting.

== Works included ==
The Orc King was published in September 2007, The Pirate King in October 2008, and The Ghost King in October 2009.

== Plot summary ==
=== The Orc King ===
In this novel, an uneasy peace between dwarves and orcs begins to fail as orc tribes fight each other, and the dwarf Bruenor Battlehammer seeks to finish the war between the two races.

=== The Pirate King ===
In this novel, Captain Deudermont seeks to rescue the city of Luskan which is under the control of the Arcane Brotherhood.

=== The Ghost King ===
In this novel, the Spellplague ravages Faerûn, catching Drizzt Do'Urden and his companions in the chaos, and Drizzt must face off against his old foe the Crenshinibon.

== Reception ==
Salvatore mixes neatly choreographed battles with philosophical musings from self-styled "renegade soul" Drizzt, lending a little depth to an otherwise straightforward hack-and-slash adventure.

— Publishers Weekly review of The Orc King,

The Orc King was No. 8 on the fiction hardcover bestseller list as reported by The Buffalo News in October 2007.

The Orc King, which marked the 20th anniversary of the character, made it to #7 on the list, as well as #9 on the Wall Street Journal list, #6 on the Publishers Weekly bestseller list, and #36 on the USA Today list of top sellers.

The Pirate King reached 8 on the New York Times bestseller list on November 2, 2008.
