= Sword Girls =

Korean digital card game

- Developer(s): Zeonix
- Release: 2011
- Genre(s): Fantasy, NTCG (Network Trading Card Game)
- Mode(s): Single-player, multiplayer

Sword Girls was a Korean digital collectible card game developed by Zeonix that was released in 2011. The game art was influenced by manga art style. It has been defunct since 2017.

The game also had an offline version in the form of a regular collectible card game published in 2012–2013.

== Summary ==
The four main factions in the game are the girls' public school life of the republic Vita, the royal kingdom's main Power Academy, the justice-upholding knight nation of Crux, and the mixed faction of night-dwellers and witches Darklore, and their interactions with and against each other, which all take place in the background of a continuing war against the technology-driven Empire of Lazion and the unfolding mysteries of otherworldly entities. There are also neutral cards that are not associated with any of the factions. In the continuing Korean version, later story episode releases introduced a fifth new faction, Empire of Lazion. The online game's card lore each tell a part of the story of various girls in different factions, ranging widely in story content such as from a Vita tennis club member's daily life to a Darklore vampire family's internal power struggle. The online game's story updates are released as "episodes" in form of booster packs and new cards that can be crafted; each new episode contains many new cards featuring older characters and introducing newer ones to the game's lore.

== Gameplay ==
The gameplay of the online version consisted of three types of cards in a deck, Spells, Followers, and Character card. The deck consisted of Spells and Followers and the Character card was the representative card of the player and if defeated would result in the player's loss. To win a duel against either a CPU or enemy player, one had to reduce the opponent's Character card life points to zero. There are several modes of gameplay available in the online version.

- The main game mode was dungeon exploring in which an unlocked dungeon could be selected to be played and replayed to unlock further dungeons.
- The second mode was Player vs Player, in which one could randomly be matched up against another online player.
- The third mode was material gathering expeditions, where the player set a Follower card to collect materials off-screen in real-time while which the player can continue playing the other modes but is unable to use the chosen Follower card until it finishes its expedition.

Followers and Character cards alike can have their stats raised to become stronger versions of themselves by giving them material gifts and other cards to consume. Focusing on a Character card's specific stat by feeding them specific materials and cards can allow that Character card to evolve into a different form, gaining new effects and visuals.

== Spin-off media ==
The Sword Girls game had several smartphone game spin-offs including a downsized mobile version and several light novel adaptations, the latter of which follows a different canon from the online game's story by introducing original characters and male characters (which have near to non-existent focus in the online version), but uses the same setting. There was also a manhwa adaption of the game that also followed a differing canon from the online version and used a male protagonist.

The game also had an offline version in the form of a regular collectible card game published in 2012–2013.

== Digital version ==
The Japanese and English online games became no longer officially supported as of 2013, while the Korean online game shut down in November 2017.

In 2023, Moesoft revived the game under the name Kanatales for smartphones.
