= The Lone Drow =

2003 novel by R. A. Salvatore

- Cover of the first edition
- Author: R. A. Salvatore
- Language: English
- Genre: Fantasy novel
- Published: 2003
- Publication place: United States
- Media type: Print (Paperback)
- Preceded by: The Thousand Orcs
- Followed by: The Two Swords

The Lone Drow is a 2003 Forgotten Realms novel and the second book in R. A. Salvatore's book series, The Hunter's Blades Trilogy. In this novel, Drizzt Do'Urden is mourning what he believes is the death of his closest friends. He is helped to regain his sense of purpose after two elves and their pegasus decide to help. He goes around killing orcs and preventing new clans from joining the army that has been gathering. While this happens, Drizzt's friends are fighting desperately against the horde.

== Plot summary ==
In The Lone Drow, Drizzt Do'Urden is mourning what he believes to be the death of his closest friends. Drizzt only regains his sense of purpose after two elves (Tarathiel and Innovindil) and their two pegasi (Sunrise and Sunset) decide to help. The dwarven druid Pikel Bouldershoulders loses his left arm at the elbow by a piece of slate thrown by a frost giant. Tarathiel, however, meets his demise at the hands of King Obould Many-Arrows. Later the orc shaman Arganth Snarrl proclaims Obould a god. Meanwhile, the remaining Companions of the Hall, who survived the attack that Drizzt earlier witnessed, are fighting an increasingly desperate battle against Obould's forces.

== Reception ==
The Lone Drow debuted on The New York Times bestseller list at number 7. Staff Reviewer Tom Gafkjen from d20zines.com awarded the book a "B" grade. He praised the well-written combat sequences (a point that was also acknowledged by Jackie Cassada when she commented on the first novel in the series) but he did not enjoy the repetitious writing about the character Drizzt brooding over the death of a moon elf. He noted the exceptional writing although preferring the first book of the trilogy. A similarly mixed review came from Publishers Weekly – while mostly negative, the reviewers acknowledged that the novel did (occasionally) rise above the cliché, and that "a few characters do achieve some complexity". Cassada, on the other hand, seemed taken by the second novel in the trilogy, praising the "tense battles, vivid landscapes and memorable characters". The Lone Drow debuted at #7 on the New York Times Best Seller list in October 2003. Publishers Weekly felt that The Lone Drow was clichéd, but that some of the characters did achieve "some complexity". They singled out two characters for praise: Innovindel, an elf who talks "pensively" of her long life in contrast to the short lived humans, and Obould the orc king.

== Review ==
- Chronicle
- SF Site
