= Belfort (game) =

Belfort is a 2011 board game published by Tasty Minstrel Games.

== Gameplay ==
Belfort is a game in which players deploy Elves, Dwarves, and Gnomes to gather resources, construct buildings, and compete for district influence in a worker‑placement city‑building contest where careful management and rising taxes determine who triumphs in Belfort.

== Reviews ==
- Black Gate
- Rebel Times #68
