= Ian Daglish =

British military historian (1952–2011)

- Born: July 2, 1952; Redhill, Surrey
- Died: July 31, 2011 (aged 59); Eccles, Salford
- Occupations: Historian, author, game designer
- Writing career
- Genre: British military history
- Website: iandaglish.co.uk

Ian Daglish (2 July 1952 – 31 July 2011) was a British military historian who specialised in writing on the British Army in the Battle of Normandy.

== Personal life ==
Ian Daglish was born in Redhill, Surrey in 1952 and lived briefly in the United States from the age of eight. At the age of ten he saw the film The Longest Day at a cinema in Providence, Rhode Island, which proved to be a formative experience. He later returned to the UK and studied history at Trinity College, Cambridge, where he won the Bowen Prize for an essay on putative Napoleonic invasions of England.

== Historian ==
Daglish published several books regarding the British Army's battles in Normandy, visiting the continent often, as a researcher and tour guide. His status as a historian was recognized by the BBC, for whom he gave interviews as a consultant on the subject of military history.

== Game Designer ==
He has also contributed to several wargames including many Advanced Squad Leader game products.

== Aviator ==
Daglish was a pilot of light aircraft. Daglish died after the Piper PA-38 Tomahawk he was piloting crashed near City Airport Manchester on 29 July 2011. He was survived by a wife, two teenage daughters, and a brother.

== Other interests ==
Daglish was one of the earliest British boardwargamers, and a prolific player and scenario designer for the game Advanced Squad Leader.

== Published works ==
Battle Ground Europe series

- Operation Bluecoat: The British Armoured Breakout (2003)
- Operation Goodwood: The Great Tank Charge (2004)

Over the Battlefield series

- Operation Goodwood (2005)
- Operation Epsom (2007)
- Operation Bluecoat (2009)

Stackpole Military History Series

- Goodwood: The British Offensive in Normandy, July 1944 (2009)

Daglish's books led to the presentation of a paper, by invitation, on the subject of Operation Bluecoat to the international conference ‘The Normandy Campaign 1944: 60 Years On’ held at the History and Governance Institute at the University of Wolverhampton in the summer of 2004. Another paper entitled ‘Operation Bluecoat – a victory ignored?’ was later published with other essays taken from conference papers in ‘The Normandy Campaign 1944: 60 Years On’, by Routledge in 2006.
