= Sea of Swords =

2001 novel by R. A. Salvatore

- Cover of the first edition
- Author: R.A. Salvatore
- Language: English
- Series: Paths of Darkness
- Genre: Fantasy novel
- Published: 2001
- Publication place: United States
- Media type: Print (Paperback)
- Preceded by: Servant of the Shard

Sea of Swords is the third and final novel in R.A. Salvatore's book series Paths of Darkness.

== Plot summary ==
Drizzt Do'Urden and his friends try and track down Wulfgar's magical hammer Aegis Fang. They stop Wulfgar's new wife Delly Curtie from being murdered in Waterdeep and are eventually reunited with Wulfgar himself with help from their old crewmate Robillard of the Sea Sprite. They track down the pirate Sheila Kree, who bought the hammer back in Luskan and who has now turned it into a symbol of her power. They discover her cohabiting in a cave complex with an ogre clan which she has bent to her will. There, Drizzt is faced by Ellifain, the elf child he saved when he was a part of a drow surface raid. She blames him for killing her mother; they fight and he unintentionally kills her, and with a little help from Morik the Rogue they succeed in taking back Wulfgar's weapon. Wulfgar then takes his family to Mithral Hall to live with his old friends.

== Reception ==
Sea of Swords debuted on The New York Times bestseller list at No. 14. It was positively reviewed in Publishers Weekly, where it debuted at No. 10 on the hardcover bestsellers list. The reviewers described the novel as a "fast–moving fantasy adventure", although they acknowledged that the book, as the last in a sequence of four, was not for the uninitiated.
