= The Legend of Drizzt (board game) =

2011 Dungeons & Dragons board game

The Legend of Drizzt is a 2011 board game published by Wizards of the Coast. In The Legend of Drizzt, the players take on the role of Drizzt Do'Urden and his adventuring companions to battle foes, and win treasure and glory, based on the adventures of Drizzt as told in The New York Times best-selling novels by R.A. Salvatore. The game features multiple scenarios and challenging quests.

== Gameplay ==
The Legend of Drizzt is designed for 1-5 players, and features cooperative game play. This game's contents can be combined with other D&D Adventure System Cooperative Play board games, such as Castle Ravenloft and Wrath of Ashardalon. The game includes 40 plastic heroes and monsters, 13 sheets of interlocking cardstock dungeon tiles, 200 encounter and treasure cards, a rulebook, a scenario book, and a 20-sided die.

== Reception ==
John O'Neill of Black Gate described the game as "a perfect way to introduce your non-gaming friends to the genre, or to get in a bit of dungeoneering on those nights when your dungeon master it too hung over to make it".

DieHard GameFan said that "all in all, I had fun with The Legend of Drizzt. It has its issues and it's the weakest of the Adventure System games so far, but it's still a fun way to while away an afternoon if you don't have a large enough group to engage in a proper tabletop session or no one has the inclination to be a Dungeon Master".
