= The Halfling's Gem =

1990 novel by R. A. Salvatore

- Cover of the first edition
- Author: R. A. Salvatore
- Cover artist: Jeff Easley
- Language: English
- Series: The Icewind Dale Trilogy
- Genre: Fantasy
- Set in: Forgotten Realms
- Publisher: TSR
- Publication date: 1990
- Publication place: United States
- Media type: Print (Paperback)
- Pages: 314 (first edition)
- ISBN: 978-0880389013
- OCLC: 21414621
- Dewey Decimal: 813.54
- LC Class: PS3569.A4625 H34
- Preceded by: Streams of Silver

The Halfling's Gem is a 1990 fantasy novel by American writer by R. A. Salvatore, the third book in The Icewind Dale Trilogy.

== Plot summary ==
The dark elf Drizzt Do'Urden and Wulfgar the barbarian race to Calimport to rescue their friend Regis—who is being held as a captive, along with Drizzt's magical panther Guenhwyvar, by Artemis Entreri—and his stolen gem from the vengeance of Pasha Pook, Regis's former boss whom Regis betrayed by stealing his hypnotizing gem. While Drizzt and Wulfgar's chase continue, it is shown to us that Bruenor is not dead. It turns out that after Bruenor jumped onto the back of Shimmergloom, he survived the fall and fire due to having hold of Drizzt's scimitar, Icingdeath. Having been invulnerable to the fire, besting the dragon, he crawled back to the surface. Breunor then fails to sneak past the duergar and fights through scores of them before facing off against a giant spider. Lady Alustriel finds the poisoned and near-dead dwarf, heals him back to health, reunites him with Catti-brie and sends both of them after Drizzt and Wulfgar by supplying them with a burning chariot. Meanwhile, Drizzt and Wulfgar are on the sea, chasing Entreri by boat with the help of his good Captain Deudermont. In the middle of a fight with pirates, Bruenor and Catti-brie arrive and "The Companions of the Hall" are united once again.

Later, the heroes arrive in Calimport and storm in into Pasha Pook's palace, only to find wererats, Pasha Pook's new-found allies led by Rassiter. Bruenor, Catti-brie and Wulfgar fight the horde of wererats while Drizzt finally duels Artemis Entreri. The two of them duel both in the sewers and in the streets of Calimport but the duel is left unfinished when the wounded Entreri, in an effort to escape, calls to everyone that Drizzt – who had been hiding his appearance with the help of a magical mask acquired earlier – is a drow. Bruenor, Catti-brie and Wulfgar come to the rescue of Drizzt, protecting him from the frightened and angry crowd.

In the throne room, Pook imprisons Drizzt and his friends in Tarterus with the help of a demonic artifact called "The Taros Hoop". Just when there seems to be no hope, Regis comes along, taking the wand that controls the portal and helping his friends. Our heroes try a desperate attempt to break free from the demodands but Catti-brie becomes unconscious, floating in the air because of the circular plane that is Tarterus. Drizzt sends everyone and rescues Catti-brie by fighting savagely with hordes of demodands. In the end, Pasha Pook dies by the claws of the freed Guenhwyar, the six companions are united once again, soldiers from the surrounding dwarven kingdoms, barbarian tribes, and human cities reclaim Mithral Hall and all turns out well. Entreri is still alive and plans his vengeance against Drizzt.

The novel holds several key events and introduces a number of important characters like Captain Deudermont of the Sea Sprite. Also, this novel is the starting of Drizzt's romantic feelings for Catti-brie – he even kisses her during Drizzt's rescue in the demonic plane (although Catti-brie was unconscious at that time.)

== Reception ==
Banophernalia gave 3.5 stars for The Halfling's Gem.

The Halfling's Gem reached 12 on The New York Times Best Seller list on March 4, 1990, and was ranked 14th in The New York Times Best Seller list on March 11, 1990.

In the Io9 series revisiting older Dungeons & Dragons novels, Rob Bricken commented that "Gem feels like it was written by the most talented, experienced author—which is absolutely wild given it's the same guy who wrote The Crystal Shard a mere two years earlier".
