= Legacy of the Drow =

Fantasy novel series by R. A. Salvatore

- The Legacy; Starless Night; Siege of Darkness; Passage to Dawn
- Author: R. A. Salvatore
- Country: United States
- Language: English
- Genre: Epic fantasy
- Publisher: TSR, Inc.; Wizards of the Coast
- Published: 1992 - 1996
- Media type: Print (hardcover/paperback)
- No. of books: 4
- Preceded by: The Icewind Dale Trilogy
- Followed by: Paths of Darkness

The Legacy of the Drow is a New York Times best-selling fantasy series by R. A. Salvatore. It is the third series following the adventures of the Forgotten Realms character Drizzt Do'Urden.

This series is followed up by the Paths of Darkness series.

== Works included ==
1. The Legacy (ISBN 978-1560766407, 1992)
2. Starless Night (ISBN 978-1560766407, 1993)
3. Siege of Darkness (ISBN 978-0786948697, 1994)
4. Passage to Dawn (ISBN 978-0786949113, 1996)

== Literary significance and reception ==
The Legacy was the first hardcover novel published by TSR, and within weeks of its release it reached the top of The New York Times Best Seller list.

The Legacy debuted on the New York Times bestseller list at number 9.

Starless Night debuted on the New York Times bestseller list at number 12.

"Starless Night is good sword-and-sorcery fare and keeps a lively pace throughout."—Adam Paul Hunt of the Library Journal.

Siege of Darkness debuted on the New York Times bestseller list at number 13.

Passage to Dawn debuted on the New York Times bestseller list at number 13.

"The Legacy of the Drow accomplishes what it sets out to do: to provide high magic fantasy entertainment. While the quartet has its share of hiccups, they are far from ruining the book."—Jake de Oude of RPGnet.
