= Starless Night =

1993 novel by R. A. Salvatore

- Cover of the first edition
- Author: R. A. Salvatore
- Language: English
- Series: Legacy of the Drow
- Genre: Fantasy literature
- Publisher: Wizards of the Coast
- Publication date: August 23, 1993
- Publication place: United States
- Media type: Print (Hardcover, Paperback)
- Pages: 311
- ISBN: 1560766530
- Preceded by: The Legacy
- Followed by: Siege of Darkness

Starless Night is a 1993 fantasy novel by American writer R. A. Salvatore. It is the second book in his Legacy of the Drow series.

== Plot summary ==
In Starless Night, Drizzt decides to return to Menzoberranzan in an attempt to keep the evil drow from launching another attack on Mithral Hall. He gives Guenhwyvar to Regis and tells him not to tell anyone where he went. When Cattie-brie later questions Regis about Drizzt's disappearance, and she makes Regis tell the truth. Regis then gives her Guenhwyvar and she decides to follow Drizzt . She first stops at the city of Silverymoon to meet with Lady Alustriel and to procure supplies. Alustriel, who has feelings for Drizzt, gives Catti-brie horses with magic horseshoes and makes a dwarven attendant, Fret, accompany her to the entrance of the Underdark. Meanwhile, Drizzt meets several elves in the woods near the Underdark and recalls the surface raiding party that he was a part of as a young drow when he saved a young girl by pretending to kill her. She meets Drizzt, and the elves send a guide, Tarathiel, to help him through the woods. The pair encounters a unicorn in the grove of Montolio and Drizzt is able to pet it. He takes it as a sign that Mielikki, the goddess of rangers, approves of his sacrifice. He makes his way into the Underdark several days later. Catti-brie also arrives at the entrance to the Underdark within two days of Drizzt, and Fret goes back to Silverymoon.

Drizzt goes first to Blingdenstone, the Underdark city of the deep gnomes, and stays for several days. Catti-brie also encounters a group of deep gnomes a day later and they show her a shortcut to Menzoberranzan. Then in Menzoberranzan, Drizzt is able to disguise himself for a little while as a slave driver on the Isle of Rothé, but is later found out. Catti-brie is near Drizzt at this point, and she witnesses his capture before being taken by Jarlaxle and held prisoner by the mercenary group Bregan D'arthe. Drizzt is taken to Matron Baenre's dungeon and tortured by one of Baenre's daughters, Vendes, the chief torturer. Entreri, somehow surviving the fall in the previous book, is now essentially the prisoner of Jarlaxle. He makes a deal with Cattie-brie in a bid to return to the surface and escape the evil drow city. He and Catti-brie steal a number of magical items from Bregan D'arthe and the sorcerer Gromph in order to free Drizzt from House Baenre during a ceremony involving all of the matrons of the eight ruling Houses of Menzoberranzan. Drizzt then kills Vendes and, in the daring escape out of the compound he fights Dantrag Baenre, who was always considered the second-best to Zaknafein (and after Zaknafein's death, Drizzt). Drizzt is victorious, obtaining Dantrag's magical bracers, while Catti-brie chooses Dantrag's evil sentient sword Khazid'hea, who wanted to be wielded by Drizzt but could not (as Drizzt favors the scimitar). Catti-brie then explodes a section of the tunnel above the House Baenre compound, destroying most of the chapel dome and interrupting the ceremony of the Matron Mothers. Entreri escapes to the surface, and Catti-brie and Drizzt return to Mithral Hall, on the way stopping by the resting place of Wulfgar.

== Reception ==
Starless Night debuted on The New York Times bestseller list at number 12.

Adam Paul Hunt of the Library Journal said that "Starless Night is good sword-and-sorcery fare and keeps a lively pace throughout."

John Setzer reviewed Starless Night in White Wolf #40 (1994), rating it a 4.5 out of 5 and stated that "Starless Night is an excellent novel, especially for Salvatore fans."
