= The Thousand Orcs =

2002 fantasy novel by R. A. Salvatore

- The cover of The Thousand Orcs
- Author: R. A. Salvatore
- Language: English
- Genre: Fantasy
- Published: 2002
- Publication place: United States
- Media type: Print (Paperback)
- Followed by: The Lone Drow

The Thousand Orcs is a fantasy novel by American writer R. A. Salvatore, the first book in his series The Hunter's Blades Trilogy. In it, Drizzt Do'Urden is separated from his friends while orcs, giants, and a few drow are determined to destroy everything in their path.

== Plot summary ==
In The Thousand Orcs, a clan of frost giants led by Gerti Orelsdottr allied with the orc King Obould Many-Arrows to send a massive army against the towns of the North. On the sidelines, four drow from the Underdark orchestrate events behind the scenes, playing each side against the other for their own advantage. Drizzt is separated from his friends during the siege at the town of Shallows. He witnesses the apparent death of the other Companions of the Hall, and turns his attention to slaughtering all of the orcs he can find, whilst reverting again to the Hunter. The other companions meet warrior dwarves of Mirabar who left because of their leader Marchion Elastuls dislike and borderline hatred for the dwarves of Mithral Hall.

== Publication history ==
The first printing of The Thousand Orcs was 200,000 copies.

== Reception ==
The Thousand Orcs debuted on The New York Times bestseller list at number 11. Reviews were generally positive. Publishers Weekly described it as a "rousing tale of derring-do and harrowing escapes", although in doing so they acknowledged that it was a "light-hearted sword and sorcery novel", which gained some depth through Drizzt's philosophical ponderings about human frailties. Similarly, Paul Brink, writing for the School Library Journal, acknowledged the author's use of Drizzt to "reflect on issues of racial prejudice".

Fred Phillips of The News-Star (Monroe, Louisiana) commented that The Thousand Orcs "shows Salvatore fully recovered from the lull his "Forgotten Realms" books went through in the mid- to late 1990s. The book kicks off the "Hunter's Blades" trilogy which promised to revitalize characters that are in need of some change."

James Voelpel from mania.com commented on The Thousand Orcs, calling it "a welcome return to the beginnings of Salvatore's fantasy writing, though it seems to be lacking in some respects. All the characters that fans have been clamoring for are here but the sheer number of secondary stories and characters sometimes drowns them out. Even the would be love affair between Catti-brie and Drizzt seems underdone and somewhat glossed over. Characters such as Bruenor, Wulfgar and Regis are almost afterthoughts with some development to their personalities seemingly tacked on. The plot itself is rock solid and the story points with Obould and Gerti's alliance as well as the rift between the dwarves and humans in Mirabar are really well done. Salvatore is always noted for his ability to write action that you can picture and he doesn't disappoint here. The battles are stupendously done and vividly portray a comic book feel to them. For then fans of Salvatore this is a welcome edition to the Drizzt legacy, albeit lacking a bit, soon enough it will rocket up the bestseller list and have its following clamoring for the follow ups."
