= Road of the Patriarch =

2006 novel by R. A. Salvatore

- Author: R. A. Salvatore
- Language: English
- Series: The Sellswords
- Genre: Fantasy
- Publisher: Wizards of the Coast
- Publication date: 2006
- Publication place: United States
- Media type: Print
- Preceded by: Promise of the Witch-King

Road of the Patriarch is the third book in The Sellswords trilogy from the Forgotten Realms fantasy novel collection written by R. A. Salvatore.

In the final episode of this series, Jarlaxle and Entreri find themselves having to answer for their actions at Zhengyi's construct. Both the Spysong Dynasty and the Citadel of Assassins have lost associates at the castle and search for an honest account of the events that took place.

Readers are finally told the dark truth behind both Entreri and Jarlaxle's childhoods, as well as a glimpse into the past of their dwarf associate Athrogate. As Entreri's past is revealed and he becomes further involved with the passionate Calihye, a different side of the mysterious assassin is finally shown.

== Plot summary ==
In the final episode of this series, Jarlaxle and Entreri find themselves having to answer for their actions at Zhengyi's construct. Both the Spysong network and the Citadel of Assassins have lost associates at the castle and search for a hero.

Artemis Entreri finds himself uncharacteristically falling in love with the half-elf Calihye, the result of a magical flute given to him by Jarlaxle which forces the owner into a heightened emotional state. Entreri is betrayed by Calihye who still blames him for the death of Parissus. She attempts to stab him in the heart with a dagger while making love to him but is foiled by a kinetic barrier conjured by Kimmuriel.

Jarlaxle seizes control of Castle Perilous and is summarily attacked by an army led by King Gareth himself. He immediately surrenders and confesses that he made an open bid for power against the king in order to unite the people of Palishchuk under Gareth's banner, willingly playing the part of a common enemy. Despite the queen's insistence that Entreri and Jarlaxle be executed for treason, they are permitted, along with Athrogate, to leave the city with his life with the promise that they will never again enter the kingdom.

The trio head for Memnon, Entreri finally deciding to face his inner demons and confront the city of his birth. Entreri soon discovers that the city is in the iron grip of a corrupt high priest who impoverishes the people through fear demanding they pay indulgences in exchange for the promise that their dead children will go to a pleasant afterlife. Entreri learns that the high priest knew his mother intimately and might even be his biological father. Disgusted by the obscene luxury of the priest's palace and the resulting destitution of the city's non-clerical inhabitants, Entreri kills the high priest and orders the palace's second-in-command, on penalty of a similar fate as his superior, to redistribute the acquired riches among those who need it.

In the end, Jarlaxle admits that he gave Entreri the flute in the hope that, in embracing emotions he'd suppressed since his traumatic childhood, he would rediscover his heart and find a purpose in life other than power. The story ends with Jarlaxle and Entreri parting ways, the latter saying he wants nothing to do with him ever again.

== Reception ==
A reviewer from Publishers Weekly called this a "bloody, brooding sequel" to Salvatore's Promise of the Witch-King.

The audio recording of Road of the Patriarch received a favorable review from California Bookwatch, which praised all aspects of the novel, including the plot, the action, and the narration by David Colacci.

Road of the Patriarch reached 13 on The New York Times Best Seller list on November 12, 2006.
