= Oz Fluxx =

Card game

Lovers (comic book) Oz Fluxx is a 2012 card game published by Looney Labs.

== Gameplay ==
Oz Fluxx is a version of Fluxx that takes place in the Land of Oz.

== Reviews ==
- ICv2
- Black Gate
