= Wrath of Ashardalon =

Board game

Dungeons & Dragons: Wrath of Ashardalon Board Game is a 2011 cooperative board game for 1 to 5 players published by Wizards of the Coast.

== Overview ==
The game is set in the Dungeons & Dragons universe. In Wrath of Ashardalon, a terrifying red dragon (Ashardalon) lurks deep within a monster-infested labyrinth maze, found inside a cave mouth. The game features multiple scenarios and challenging quests.

== Contents ==
Wrath of Ashardalon includes 42 plastic heroes and monsters, 13 sheets of interlocking cardstock dungeon tiles, 200 encounter and treasure cards, a rulebook, a scenario book, and a 20-sided die.

== Reception ==
Ben Kuchera of Penny Arcade called Wrath of Ashardalon "a good way to sneak in a quick dungeon crawl when a full Dungeons and Dragons session would take too long".

== Reviews ==
- Realms of Fantasy
