= Paths of Darkness =

Novel series by R. A. Salvatore

- The Silent Blade (1998); The Spine of the World (1999); Servant of the Shard (2000); Sea of Swords (2001)
- Author: R. A. Salvatore
- Country: United States
- Language: English
- Genre: Epic fantasy
- Publisher: TSR, Inc.; Wizards of the Coast
- Published: 1998 - 2001
- Media type: Print
- No. of books: 4
- Preceded by: Legacy of the Drow
- Followed by: The Hunter's Blades Trilogy, The Sellswords

Paths of Darkness is an epic fantasy series of novels chronicling adventures of the renegade drow elf character Drizzt Do'Urden written by R. A. Salvatore. It is the follow-up series to Legacy of the Drow and is followed up by The Hunter's Blades Trilogy, and also followed on from the Servant of the Shard in The Sellswords trilogy.

Todd Lockwood painted the covers for The Silent Blade and The Spine of the World.

== Works included ==
1. The Silent Blade (1998)
2. The Spine of the World (1999)
3. Servant of the Shard (2000)*
4. Sea of Swords (2001)

*Servant of the Shard (2000) is also the first book of The Sellswords series, which follows Jarlaxle and Artemis Entreri.

== Literary significance and reception ==
The Silent Blade debuted on the New York Times bestseller list at No. 32.

The Spine of the World debuted on the New York Times bestseller list at No. 25.

Servant of the Shard debuted on the New York Times bestseller list at No. 25.

Sea of Swords debuted on the New York Times bestseller list at No. 14. It was positively reviewed in Publishers Weekly, where it debuted at No. 10 on the hardcover bestsellers list. The reviewers described the novel as a "fast–moving fantasy adventure", although they acknowledged that the book, as the last in a sequence of four, was not for the uninitiated.

Matt Drake of RPGnet gave the series a 4 (out of 5) for style, stating that "Salvatore's chrome is starting to tarnish in a few spots, but he is still a great fantasy novelist." He gave it a 3 (out of 5) for substance, stating "With the exception of Spine of the World, these stories are a little predictable and trite."
