= The Spine of the World =

1999 novel by R. A. Salvatore

- Cover of the first edition
- Author: R. A. Salvatore
- Language: English
- Series: Paths of Darkness
- Genre: Fantasy
- Publisher: Wizards of the Coast
- Publication date: 1999
- Publication place: United States
- Media type: Print
- Pages: 345
- ISBN: 9780786914180
- OCLC: 671815628
- Preceded by: The Silent Blade
- Followed by: Servant of the Shard

The Spine of the World is the second book in R. A. Salvatore's book series, Paths of Darkness.

== Publication history ==
The Spine of the World was written by R. A. Salvatore. It was republished in April 2009 as the twelfth book in the "Legend of Drizzt" series.

Todd Lockwood painted the cover for Spine of the World.

== Plot summary ==
Wulfgar and his new friend, Morik the Rogue, are convicted of the attempted murder of Wulfgar's old companion Captain Deudermont, a crime they did not commit. Morik the Rogue is an unscrupulous human who comes along as a traveling and drinking companion to barbarian hero Wulfgar, and is a close, but not necessarily trusted, friend. Wulfgar's mighty warhammer Aegis Fang is stolen and sold to a notorious pirate. They narrowly avoid the horrors of Luskan's prisoner's carnival, but through the intervention of the victim himself, they are spared. As the book progresses, Wulfgar slowly climbs out of his despair, finally setting out to find the life he thought lost to the darkness. After their eviction from the city, they set out to become bandits on the roads outside the city. They prove to not be very proficient at it, though, and soon become involved in the politics of a backwater town in which the peasant fiancée of the local lord bears an illegitimate child. Wulfgar is blamed, but is helped to escape, and adopts the baby girl as his own.

== Reception ==
The Spine of the World debuted on The New York Times bestseller list at No. 25.
