= The Ghost King =

2009 novel by R. A. Salvatore

- Cover of the first edition
- Author: R. A. Salvatore
- Cover artist: Todd Lockwood
- Language: English
- Series: Transitions
- Genre: Fantasy novel
- Publisher: Wizards of the Coast
- Publication date: October 6, 2009
- Publication place: United States
- Media type: Print (Hardback)
- Pages: 352
- ISBN: 978-0-7869-5233-5
- Preceded by: The Pirate King

The Ghost King is the third book in the Transitions series, written by R. A. Salvatore.

== Plot summary ==
When the Spellplague ravages Faerûn, old friends and foes alike are caught in the chaos. The blinding light released from the destruction of Crenshinibon burned out the eyes of the mighty Hephaestus, leaving him angry, sullen and defeated. A strand of Mystra's falling Weave released the necromancy of the ruined shard, reviving as apparitions the seven original liches that created it and giving sentience to the dead mind flayer Yharaskrik. Yharaskrik tricks Hephaestus into breathing onto Crenshinibon again, which transforms the dragon into a dracolich. Yharaskrik compels Hephaestus to smash Crenshinibon into his skull, binding them together. Yharaskrik's sentience then binds with Hephaestus/Crenshinibon, the three becoming the Ghost King.

The three minds, with no privacy and never alone in the one body, had a great shared power: the dracolich's flight, strength, breath and an aura of death and disease, the militant and strategic mind - as well as psionic powers - of the mind-flayer, and the Crystal Shard's necromantic powers and patience combined. Seeking revenge on those responsible for his blindness, the mind of Hephaestus immediately set his sights on Jarlaxle Baenre.

Traveling with the silly, but undeniably dangerous, dwarf Athrogate, the latter rhyming the whole way, Jarlaxle snapped out of Reverie one night at the intrusion of the dracolich threatening to find him. Not unintelligent, Jarlaxle had not missed the Spellplague beginning around him as Mystra's Weave itself collapsed. And after being attacked - first by the undead and second by one of Crenshinibon's liches, who he inadvertently destroyed when he threw his pocket hole dimension over the top of the lich, which collided with the dimensional gate the lich contained - they caused a rift and the lich disappeared. He knew the only way to survive and perhaps stop this horrid monstrosity of a foe was to enlist the help of the mighty drow Drizzt, as well as the holy Deneirrath priest Cadderly. He also knew, due to the last encounter with Cadderly - ending in a threat should Jarlaxle ever return to Spirit Soaring - that the only way to get Cadderly was to get Drizzt, and the only way to Drizzt was Cadderly. As he journeyed to Mithral Hall, attempting to discern a way to get the drow on his side, he learned of a terrible side effect of Mystra's falling Weave touching Drizzt's wife Catti-brie. He then decides his only chance - maybe Faerûn's only chance - was to convince Drizzt that Cadderly was her only chance and to let him go with him as well. After using a disguised Athrogate to convince Bruenor and Drizzt that Cadderly was Catti-brie's best hope, Jarlaxle meets up with Drizzt, Bruenor and Pwent, explains to him their plight and how their problems may be connected.

Meanwhile, Spirit Soaring is filled with priests, mages, sages and scholars of all sorts, all gathered to discuss the recent failures in magic, the failure of some gods to answer but not others and other effects of the Spellplague. Shortly after Cadderly's children and the druidic dwarf Pikel arrive at Carradoon, the town starts being assaulted by the Ghost King's undead which, despite their great martial prowess, drives them and the town's people deep into caves under the mountain. At the same time creatures of the Shadow Plane begin assaulting Spirit Soaring but the combined might of the remaining empowered priests and wizards, led by Cadderly, hold them off until sunrise, when they retreat. Shortly after, as the remaining people at Spirit Soaring equip themselves with magical weapons of the cathedral's collection, their patrols begin to report heavier losses as magic begins to fail completely. Cadderly attempts to find Deneir and finds his god weaving the Metatext and therefore himself into the broken Weave to fix the damage and stabilize it. Soon after, a group of priests and mages who have lost faith sally forth against Cadderly's advice to escape and return a few minutes later as zombies at the forefront of an army of shadow creatures, who had returned even during the day.

Drizzt and company run into Danica, Cadderly's wife, who had been out searching for their missing children when she stumbled across what appeared to be the death of Ivan Bouldershoulder at the Ghost King's foot. Barely escaping alive and with Jarlaxle's help, she recovers in time for them to reach the battle at Spirit Soaring. They attempt to press through with the unconscious Catti-brie on a wagon but not even a fierce charge by the dwarven heroes followed by the speed of the drow could break through the unstoppable tide. Seeing his wife and some friends in danger, his need to act called out and something answered. Reciting off unknown spells, he creates a flying horse and carriage out of a cloud and rides down to rescue the fighters below displaying godlike power in the form of potent and great unknown spells.

The Ghost King is defeated but escapes to the Shadowfell, where he recovers rapidly. He returns and is defeated a second time, disappearing to the Shadowfell again. Cadderly uses Catti-brie as a conduit to enter the Shadowfell to finish off the Ghost King. In the end, Cadderly defeats the Ghost King at the cost of his life and becomes the new Ghost King, forever reinforcing and guarding the ward containing the rift left by the old Ghost King. The rift is in the shattered remains of Spirit Soaring. Catti-brie is allowed one last night with Drizzt, before she and Regis both die from the Spellplague and are taken by Mielikki as a reward partly to Drizzt. The goddess puts them into a pocket paradise plane for all time.

== Reception ==
The Ghost King reached 11 on The New York Times bestseller list on October 25, 2009.
