= The Crystal Shard =

1988 novel by R. A. Salvatore

- Cover of the first edition
- Author: R. A. Salvatore
- Cover artist: Larry Elmore
- Language: English
- Series: The Icewind Dale Trilogy
- Genre: Fantasy
- Set in: Forgotten Realms
- Published: 1988
- Publisher: TSR, Inc.
- Publication place: United States
- Media type: Print (Paperback)
- Pages: 336 (first edition)
- ISBN: 978-0880385350 (first edition)
- OCLC: 17660782
- Dewey Decimal: 813.54
- LC Class: PS3569.A4625 C78
- Followed by: Streams of Silver

The Crystal Shard is a 1988 fantasy novel by American writer R. A. Salvatore. The first book in The Icewind Dale Trilogy, it was his first published novel.

== Plot summary ==
Even in the remote far northern region of Icewind Dale, the renegade dark elf ranger Drizzt Do'Urden is not fully accepted, except by the dwarves whom he had eventually befriended. He roams the tundra, hunting down yeti and giants that threaten the Ten Towns of Icewind Dale. When the Dale's native barbarians band together to slaughter the people of Ten-Towns, whom they view as invaders, Drizzt, with his drow stealth and ranger's knowledge of the terrain, discerns their plan and relays the information to his friends, the halfling Regis and the dwarf Bruenor. Regis, on the council of Ten-Towns, uses persuasion and a magical hypnotic ruby pendant to convince the stubborn leaders of the towns to work together to thwart the barbarian attack.

Because of the warning and their unified efforts, Ten-Towns and the dwarves successfully repel the barbarian attackers. Drizzt personally meets the barbarian king, Heafstaag, in combat. He wounds Heafstaag many times, including a stab to the stomach that should have been fatal, but the king manages to survive and escape after wounding Drizzt. Meanwhile, Bruenor clashes with a young barbarian standard bearer, who breaks the shaft of his banner over the dwarf's head to no effect. Bruenor then slams the youth with his shield, rendering him unconscious. After the battle, Bruenor saves him from being killed in cold blood by the townspeople, instead taking the young man, Wulfgar, son of (the late) Beornegar into his care. Bruenor also defends the wounded and unconscious Drizzt, slamming Kemp to the ground and breaking the nose of his lieutenant when he finds them kicking the injured drow. Bruenor tells the people of Ten Towns that if not for Drizzt Do'Urden, they would now be dead, which grants Drizzt a measure of acceptance and respect in Icewind Dale.

Five years pass, with Wulfgar indentured to the dwarves. Bruenor teaches him to smith and mine, and comes to love him like a son. Though Wulfgar initially resents the dwarves and his indenture, he grows to respect and even love Bruenor, like his own father who had died years past.

During this time, the failed wizard Akar Kessel, left to die in the Spine of the World, finds Crenshinibon, the Crystal Shard, a magical, sentient crystal with the ability to lend power to its wielder, make tower sanctuaries in the likeness of itself, and insinuate itself into the minds of others, including that of its wielder. Crenshinibon, obsessed with gaining power, twists Akar Kessel's mind into doing its will. Kessel, oblivious to the manipulation, decides to conquer Icewind Dale for his own. He enslaves the goblins and orcs of the nearby mountains, building them into his own army, their wills completely destroyed by Crenshinibon. He even manages to gain control of Heafstaag, and through him the tribes of barbarians. He also acquires the services of a balor demon named Errtu to be his general, though the demon has more interest in obtaining Crenshinibon for himself than in serving Akar Kessel.

Near the end of Wulfgar's indenture, Bruenor forges Aegis-fang, a magical warhammer, for his adopted son. He then takes Wulfgar to be trained in the ways of battle, choosing Drizzt as the young man's instructor. Despite his ambivalence about training under a drow, Wulfgar quickly comes to respect and admire the dark elf, and Drizzt turns the young man into a formidable warrior. The two of them clear out an entire lair of verbeeg (the least of the giant species, around a height of ten feet), led by a frost giant named Biggrin with only the help of Drizzt's magical black panther companion Guenhwyvar. Wulfgar then leaves to hunt down a white dragon, Ingeloakastimizilian, more commonly known as Icingdeath. Drizzt tracks him, and the two of them kill the dragon. Drizzt finds a scimitar in the treasure hoard and claims it for his own, eventually naming it after the dragon.

As Akar Kessel moves on Ten-Towns, his armies sweeping aside the disorganized defense with little trouble, Wulfgar takes the horns of Icingdeath and challenges Heafstaag for kingship. He wins the challenge, killing the old king. Drizzt, sensing the demon Errtu, and recognizing the balor from his days living in the deep underground drow city of Menzoberranzan, calls the demon and faces it alone with Guenhwyvar. With the aid of the fire-banishing properties of the scimitar Icingdeath, he manages to defeat Errtu, banishing it to the abyss for one hundred years.

After defeating the demon, Drizzt uses his stealth and Guenhwyvar's unnatural eyes to find his way into the Crystal Tower, Cryshal-Tirith, where he fights his way past Akar Kessel's orcs and trolls to face the wizard himself. The wizard, sure of victory, imprisons the drow in a cage of magical light, and taunts him with images of the barbarians joining the battle for Ten-Towns, thinking that Heafstaag still led them. However, Wulfgar leads his people not against Ten-Towns, but against Kessel. With the help of Regis, a halfling prisoner in the tower, Drizzt escapes his cage, and follows Kessel through a portal to the top of Kelvin's Cairn, the sole mountain in Icewind Dale. There, after a short battle, the magical heat of Crenshinibon destabilizes the snow cap, and an avalanche kills Kessel and takes Drizzt back down the mountain. Crenshinibon, buried under the avalanche and blocked from the light of the sun (its power source) and weakened by Regis' destruction of Cryshal-Tirth, loses its control over the remaining orcs and goblins, who are ultimately slaughtered. Bruenor, faking mortal injury, tricks Drizzt into agreeing to search for Mithral Hall, Bruenor's boyhood home.

== Development ==
In 1987 R.A. Salvatore sent Mary Kirchoff, then managing editor of TSR's book department, a manuscript for what would become his 1990 novel Echoes of the Fourth Magic. She liked it, but asked if he could rewrite it to take place in the Forgotten Realms. She sent him Darkwalker on Moonshae by Douglas Niles, the only novel at the time set in the Forgotten Realms. Salvatore sent her a proposal for a sequel to Darkwalker, but Kirchoff sent back a large map of the Forgotten Realms and told him she wanted a new story set in a different part of the Realms. After two weeks of phone calls, Salvatore found a spot on the map that was not already designated for another project, and he located Icewind Dale there. According to Salvatore, the book was "set on the Moonshae Isles, because at the time I thought that was the Realms. When I found out how big the Realms were, I moved the story a thousand miles to the north." Salvatore had planned to include some characters from Darkwalker but when his editor moved the setting of the book to the far north of the Realms in Icewind Dale, he replaced Tristan and his animal companion Canthus with new characters of his own creation, Drizzt Do'Urden and his magic panther companion Guenhwyvar.

Salvatore had sent an early version of The Crystal Shard (what would become his first published novel) to TSR, and one day Kirchoff called him. She was on her way to a marketing meeting concerning the book, and informed him that they could not use one of the characters. He asked for time to think, but she was already late for the meeting. Off the top of his head, Salvatore said he had a Dark Elf. Kirchoff was skeptical, but Salvatore convinced her it would be fine because he was just a sidekick. She asked his name, and he replied Drizzt Do'Urden. She asked if he could spell it, and he said "not a chance".

== Reception ==
Banophernalia gave 3 stars for The Crystal Shard.

The Crystal Shard was #5 on CBR's 2020 "10 Of The Best DnD Stories To Start Off With" list — the article states that "The reason why this book is a great entry point is that it provides a great introduction to the Icewind Dale region of Faérun that is featured in a ton of other D & D products. The trilogy also has a neat familial dynamic to its party of heroes that can be used to spice up a player's party in D & D."

In the Io9 series revisiting older Dungeons & Dragons novels, Rob Bricken commented that "Even though I ended up finding the writing more tolerable than I had suspected, the book is deeply, deeply flawed to say the least. So for my rating, The Crystal Shard rolls a 3 on a 1d20."

== Reviews ==
- Coleção Dragão Brasil
