= Passage to Dawn =

1996 novel by R. A. Salvatore

- Cover of the first edition
- Author: R. A. Salvatore
- Language: English
- Series: Legacy of the Drow
- Genre: Fantasy literature
- Publisher: Wizards of the Coast
- Publication date: 1996
- Publication place: United States
- Media type: Print
- Pages: 313
- ISBN: 9780786907502
- OCLC: 670434020
- Preceded by: Siege of Darkness

Passage to Dawn is a 1996 fantasy novel by American writer R. A. Salvatore. It is the fourth and final book of his Legacy of the Drow series.

== Plot summary ==
Passage to Dawn finds Drizzt and Catti-brie aboard the Sea Sprite six years after the events of the previous novel (Siege of Darkness, 1994), with the company of its captain, Deudermont, its wizard Robillard, and its powerful crew. The Sea Sprite is indeed a feared force on the Sword Coast, with few pirates choosing to attack its deadly wizard, drow ranger, panther, archer or ballista. They have been hunting pirates for the six years after the Battle of Mithral Hall. The balor, Errtu, who needs Drizzt to break his banishment; takes Deudermont's shape and it is unmasked when it hints to a mysterious island. Deudermont looks for the island to find out who sent the creature. The Sea Sprite crew goes to Mintarn in search of information about the mysterious Caerwich. They are attacked by pirates, but they manage to escape also because of the magical arrival of Harkle Harpell, who joins the crew. After a long and perilous journey, the Sea Sprite reaches Caerwich. There more dangers await the companions, but they eventually find an old hag who gives a riddle message to Drizzt and Catti-brie. The drow believes that the message implies that his father is alive and held by Lolth. The companions look for more information from a fiend of the Abyss, contacting it through a priest. On the journey back, the Sea Sprite is nearly destroyed by a storm and is saved by Harkle, whose spell magically transports the damaged schooner in Impresk Lake, near the residence of the priest Cadderly Bonaduce.

The companions go to Icewind Dale where Crenshinibon lies, the place where Errtu will more likely show up. In the meantime the crystal shard itself is found and taken by Stumpet Rakingclaw. Errtu is summoned by a wizard, but he breaks free and flies to Icewind Dale. He takes Crenshinibon from Stumpet, capturing her soul and using her body as a bait to lure Drizzt to him. Stumpet's body leads the companions to the Sea of Moving Ice. There they are attacked by Taers sent by Crenshinibon, and they beat the creatures because of the arrival of Revjak and his warriors. Berkthgar and his men, who were also following the companions, arrive as well and eventually the heroes make the barbarian realize his mistakes. The companions then proceed to their quest and they eventually reach Cryshal-Tirith, where battle with Errtu's minions ensues. Regis infiltrates the tower and, with cunning and willpower, he manages to lock Crenshinibon in a box from where its power cannot escape. In the meantime the others are saved by the arrival of Kierstaad, son of Revjak, wielding Aegis-fang, taken from Bruenor's quarters. Errtu's prisoner, Wulfgar, breaks free and joins battle with his warhammer. The companions eventually defeat Errtu.

== Reception ==
Trenton Webb reviewed Passage to Dawn for Arcane magazine, rating it a 4 out of 10 overall. He commented that "Bucking the Prince, Princess and Dragon rescue trend, Passage to Dawn tries to add the extra element of mystery to the adventure by withholding the identity of the victim. So, where more traditional tales focus on the link between rescuer and abductee, this story drags its heroes the length of the Forgotten Realms on a mission to save somebody. They're not exactly sure who, but someone needs rescuing and there's a good chance of a ruck, too." Webb adds: "This plotline employs an eclectic cast who seem bound by AD&D reality when it suits them and liberally free of it when the plot gets out of hand. Drizzit, the star, is a male Ranger with a fondness for sunrises and the open sea, while the wizard Harkle Harpell behaves exactly as described in the Forgotten Realms expansion set The North, but his unbridled power and sudden appearance is, sadly, anything but convincing." He continues: "Together with dwarven-raised humans, barbarian friendly halflings and kindhearted pirates, the characters do their damnedest to add gusto. But while this makes individual encounters fun, it begins to pull the weak plot out of shape. What starts out as a pirate chase turns into a treasure hunt, which leads the crew to a far away lake and back up north for a final showdown with a Balor." Webb concludes his review by saying, "The result is a vaguely interesting tale which leaps between locales and characters for its own benefit rather than the reader's. All too often, your concentration is shattered by the introduction of Drizzit's essays on life, a sudden change of tack, or the arbitrary introduction of superfluous characters. There are some neat set-pieces but they just don't hold together."

Passage to Dawn debuted on The New York Times Best Seller list at number 13.
