= Companions of the Hall =

Fictional adventuring group in the Forgotten Realms

- Forgotten Realms organization
- Cover art for the 2013 book The Companions depicting every member of the group as well as Drizzt Do'Urden's panther companion Guenhwyvar
- First appearance: The Crystal Shard (1988)
- Created by: R. A. Salvatore
- Genre: High fantasy
- Location: Icewind Dale and Mithral Hall
- Key people: Drizzt Do'Urden; Bruenor Battlehammer; Catti-brie; Wulfgar; Regis
- Purpose: Group of adventurers

The Companions of the Hall, also known as the Companions of Mithral Hall, are a fictional adventuring party in R. A. Salvatore's The Legend of Drizzt novels, set in the Forgotten Realms. The group consists of the drow ranger Drizzt Do'Urden, the dwarf Bruenor Battlehammer, the humans Catti-brie and Wulfgar, and the halfling Regis. Associated principally with the Icewind Dale region and the dwarven stronghold of Mithral Hall, from which the group takes its name, the characters first appear together in the 1988 novel The Crystal Shard and recur throughout the wider series.

Salvatore originally developed Wulfgar as the protagonist of The Crystal Shard and created Drizzt as his companion. Drizzt later became the central character instead while Salvatore was writing the novel, and Catti-brie was added after an editor observed that the original draft lacked a female lead. Changes to the chronology of the Forgotten Realms later separated the group, before Salvatore reunited its members in The Companions, published in 2013, and the subsequent Companions Codex trilogy.

Critical discussion of the Companions has addressed the changing prominence of the five characters, their function as Drizzt's adopted family, and the group's treatment of friendship, belonging, and difference. The ensemble has also been adapted for comics, tabletop games and video games.

== Development and publication ==
Salvatore devised Wulfgar as the protagonist of his first Forgotten Realms novel. He initially expected to use characters from Douglas Niles's Darkwalker on Moonshae, but was told not to use Niles's characters and to create a new companion for Wulfgar. Salvatore proposed a drow ranger as Wulfgar's sidekick and named him Drizzt. While writing an early scene in The Crystal Shard, Salvatore decided that Drizzt should instead become the novel's lead.

Catti-brie did not appear in Salvatore's first draft of The Crystal Shard. In a 2013 Reddit question-and-answer session, he wrote that an editor had pointed out the absence of a female lead, and that he named the new character after his daughter Caitlin Brielle, who was born fifteen days after he delivered the draft. Salvatore later discussed the hostile responses he received as Catti-brie became a more powerful character. He connected her development to a broader move by fantasy writers away from female characters who existed only to be rescued. Salvatore ended the 1996 novel Passage to Dawn with "Drizzt and Catti-brie riding off into the sunset" as he had envisioned it to be his final book about Drizzt and his companions after falling out with his then-publisher, TSR, Inc.

For the fourth edition of Dungeons & Dragons, the Forgotten Realms chronology was advanced by about a century, interrupting unfinished storylines involving the shorter-lived Companions. Catti-brie and Regis died during the Spellplague, while Bruenor died in a later series. Salvatore said that the change forced him to adapt his plans and that his experiences of unexpected bereavement influenced the deaths of Catti-brie and Regis. In The Companions, Bruenor, Catti-brie, Regis, and Wulfgar receive second lives and set out to rejoin Drizzt. Salvatore was uncertain whether readers would accept their return and used the characters' memories of their earlier lives to give them different goals and perspectives. The reunited group next appeared in Night of the Hunter, the first novel of the Companions Codex trilogy which was published 2014.

== Characters and portrayal ==
The group combines characters from different fantasy races and social backgrounds. An EBSCO reference entry identifies Drizzt as the central character of The Icewind Dale Trilogy, but presents the other characters through their relationships with him and one another. Bruenor is the first member of the group to befriend Drizzt and is Catti-brie's adoptive father. Catti-brie sympathizes with the isolation caused by Drizzt's drow heritage, while Wulfgar's compulsory service to Bruenor develops into friendship and Drizzt trains him as a warrior. Regis's flight from a southern thieves' guild eventually draws the others into a journey to rescue him.

The Crystal Shard presents Drizzt, Bruenor, Wulfgar, and Regis as its principal adventurers, while Catti-brie initially has a smaller supporting role. In Streams of Silver, Bruenor, Drizzt, Wulfgar, and Regis search for Mithral Hall. Catti-brie follows them, escapes after being captured, and joins the others at the stronghold. Regis is abducted at the end of the novel, leading to the collective rescue story in The Halfling's Gem.

A 2014 profile in The Escapist observed that Drizzt and the Companions had remained associated across more than twenty novels.

== Other media ==
The Companions appear together as non-player characters in the 2000 role-playing game Baldur's Gate II: Shadows of Amn. The player's party may encounter Drizzt, Bruenor, Catti-brie, Wulfgar, and Regis after leaving the Underdark and can enlist their help in an assault on the stronghold of the vampire Bodhi, one of the game's antagonists.

The three novels of The Icewind Dale Trilogy were adapted into graphic novels and later collected by IDW Publishing in the 2012 volume Dungeons & Dragons: Forgotten Realms—The Legend of Drizzt Omnibus, Volume 2. All five Companions are also playable heroes in Wizards of the Coast's 2011 cooperative board game The Legend of Drizzt, which uses characters, enemies, and locations from Salvatore's novels.

Drizzt, Bruenor, Catti-brie, Wulfgar, and Regis are playable characters in Idle Champions of the Forgotten Realms, where they form the game's Companions of the Hall affiliation and provide bonuses when placed together in a formation. The five were also released as companion characters in the massively multiplayer role-playing game Neverwinter during its 2021 "Summer of Drizzt" promotion; Regis was available only through a bundle containing the complete group.

Four of the Companions were represented as legendary creature cards in the 2021 Magic: The Gathering release Adventures in the Forgotten Realms and its associated Commander products. Drizzt and Bruenor appeared in the principal card set, while Catti-brie appeared in the Aura of Courage Commander deck and Wulfgar in Draconic Rage.

Drizzt, Bruenor, Catti-brie, and Wulfgar are the player characters of the 2021 video game Dungeons & Dragons: Dark Alliance. GamesBeat described it as the first video game to give Drizzt and the Companions a starring role. Tuque Games distinguished the characters through their characteristic weapons and fighting styles and used exchanges between them to convey their personalities and longstanding relationships. The game is set after The Crystal Shard and is not narratively connected to the earlier Dark Alliance games, although it retains their emphasis on cooperative play. Salvatore advised the developers not to retell an existing novel, leading them to place a new adventure between published stories. He accepted changes made for the adaptation, including portraying Catti-brie as the experienced adventurer she becomes in later books rather than as she was immediately after The Crystal Shard.

== Reception ==
Reviewing the collected Icewind Dale Trilogy for RPGnet, Jake de Oude compared the variety of the five-character cast with the Fellowship of the Ring and discussed each member's place within the ensemble. In later retrospective reviews for io9, Rob Bricken described The Crystal Shard as an ensemble novel that was nevertheless overshadowed by Drizzt. He regarded Bruenor, Wulfgar, and Regis as variations on familiar dwarf, barbarian, and hobbit types, and criticized Catti-brie's limited role. Bricken found Catti-brie substantially better developed in Streams of Silver, where he considered her a protagonist and an equal participant in the climax. In The Halfling's Gem, he found that Drizzt remained the principal character but credited Regis with taking an active role in resisting his captors and assisting his rescuers.

Francisco David García Martín, writing in the academic journal Neomedieval, interpreted Drizzt's arrival in Icewind Dale as the point at which the character first acquires genuine friendships, a sense of belonging, and a new family. García Martín argued that these relationships allow Drizzt to construct an identity from the boundary between his original community and an adopted social group, making belonging and exclusion central to the character's development.

Reviews differed over the return of the Companions. Kelly Jensen of SF Crowsnest considered the bond among the five characters central to the series' treatment of friendship, loyalty, and honor. Tomasz Cybulski of the Polish fantasy publication Poltergeist criticized the parallel childhood narratives of Bruenor, Catti-brie, and Regis as repetitive and slow, although he believed that the ending recovered the adventurous tone promised by the premise. Reviewing Night of the Hunter, Rossana Barbagallo of Tom's Hardware Italia described the Companions as Drizzt's family and regarded their reunion and shared rescue mission as central to the novel's appeal. She nevertheless criticized the amount of space devoted to political intrigue in Menzoberranzan at the expense of Drizzt and the group.

Reviews of Dark Alliance also differed on the adaptation of the group. Andy Kelly of PC Gamer wrote that the four playable characters had markedly different combat styles and that Salvatore's involvement gave the conventional plot a stronger connection to the novels. Garrick Durham-Raley of MMORPG.com, by contrast, found that the game did little to communicate its story or explore Icewind Dale despite using the Companions and events following The Crystal Shard.
