= Streams of Silver =

1989 novel by R. A. Salvatore

- Cover of the first edition
- Author: R. A. Salvatore
- Cover artist: Clyde Caldwell
- Language: English
- Series: The Icewind Dale Trilogy
- Genre: Fantasy
- Set in: Forgotten Realms
- Published: TSR, 1989
- Publication place: United States
- Media type: Print (Paperback)
- Pages: 342
- ISBN: 0-88038-672-X
- OCLC: 19409279
- Dewey Decimal: 813.54
- LC Class: PS3569.A4846 S77
- Preceded by: The Crystal Shard
- Followed by: The Halfling's Gem

Streams of Silver is a fantasy novel by American writer R. A. Salvatore. It is the second book in his The Icewind Dale Trilogy.

== Plot summary ==
Following the events of The Crystal Shard, Bruenor leads his friends Drizzt Do'Urden, the barbarian Wulfgar, and a surprisingly enthusiastic Regis, on a quest to reclaim Mithril Hall, the ancient stronghold of his clan. However, Regis has an ulterior motive for coming along; namely to elude the dangerous assassin Artemis Entreri, sent by Pasha Pook of Calimshan to recover the magical ruby that Regis stole from him.

Just as the companions are setting out, Entreri arrives in Ten-Towns, soon locating Regis' abandoned home and finding Catti-brie there. The young woman finds herself hopelessly outmatched and paralyzed by fear, telling him all about Regis and the companions' quest. Entreri allows her to live, confident that she will not dare to interfere with his plans. Afraid for her friends, and desperate to regain her honor, she follows after both the companions and Entreri, hoping to warn her friends. On the way to Luskan, Entreri realizes that he is being followed and captures Catti-brie again, this time taking her along as a prisoner to use against the companions.

Meanwhile, the companions reach Luskan, and seek out a map of the Northlands to aid in their quest. However, Dendybar the Mottled — an ambitious wizard from the Hosttower of the Arcane — has heard of the Crystal Shard and believes that Drizzt still possesses it, and plots to take it for his own ends. He forges an uneasy alliance with Entreri so that both may achieve their goals, and sends his apprentice Sydney with Entreri, along with his golem (Bok) and a soldier named Jierdan.

The companions travel across the Northlands towards Silverymoon, encountering barbarian tribes, an eccentric wizard family (the Harpells) and the soldiers of Nesme, who react to Drizzt with hostility, forcing the companions to divert across the Evermoors, also known as the Trollmoors, an ordeal that almost makes an end of them. Upon reaching Silverymoon, Drizzt is again shunned, but the companions are directed by Lady Alustriel to the Herald's Holdfast, where they obtain the final clues to the location of Mithril Hall.

During her time as a captive, Catti-brie slowly overcomes her fear of Entreri, and begins to play on the volatile relationships between Entreri and his allies, creating an opportunity for her to escape as the evil group closes in on the companions. Reunited with her friends, Catti-brie accompanies them into the ancient Dwarven stronghold, discovering that the duergar who forced Bruenor's clan out are still there, working the mines for their own ends. Within the upper chambers of Mithril Hall, the two groups clash, and Drizzt and Entreri find themselves face-to-face.

The meeting between Drizzt and Entreri marks the beginning of a long-running and deadly feud between the two. The two warriors are evenly matched in battle, and each sees a twisted mirror image of himself in the other; Drizzt the drow with a human soul, and Entreri the human who should have been born a drow. During the battle, a cave-in separates the two groups but results in Drizzt and Entreri being trapped together deep in the complex. They are forced to work together to escape, an experience which heightens both their resentment of the other's ideology, and their respect for one another's prowess. Although initially tasked with the capture of Regis and the return of the ruby for his master Pasha Pook, Entreri finds himself so challenged by Drizzt's very existence that he later uses Guenhwyvar's statue, stolen from Drizzt, to further bait the drow into following him so that they can duel to find out who is the better warrior.

Bruenor, Wulfgar, Regis and Catti-brie, believing Drizzt to have perished, continue their quest with heavy hearts; Bruenor decides that they will only scout the upper levels, and begins to doubt the wisdom of trying to retake Mithril Hall. They find the Hall of Dumathoin, recovering the magical bow Taulmaril (the Heartseeker) which later becomes Catti-brie's signature weapon. On their way out, they find themselves attacked by duergar, and forced into a battle with the shadow dragon Shimmergloom, the master of the duergar. It is only because of Bruenor's heroic sacrifice that the dragon is slain and his friends survive.

Shortly afterwards, Drizzt is reunited with his friends, although Entreri takes advantage of the situation to finally capture Regis and make his escape, taunting Drizzt to follow him. The story ends with Catti-brie making arrangements for Clan Battlehammer to reclaim the hall, along with help from Wulfgar's tribe and the dwarves of Citadel Adbar, whilst Drizzt and Wulfgar begin their chase to rescue Regis from the clutches of Entreri.

== Reception ==
Banophernalia gave 3.5 stars for Streams of Silver.

Ian Strelec, Staff reviewer for d20zines.com awarded Streams of Silver with a B+ rating. Vivid descriptions and good characterizations were praised in the novel however he was critical of unrealistic situations as well an over emphasis on combat scenarios.

In the Io9 series revisiting older Dungeons & Dragons novels, Rob Bricken commented that "the fact that the book has a solid female protagonist and antagonist (that would be Sydney) is a vast and much-needed improvement over The Crystal Shard. They don't make up for all of the book's problems, so Streams of Silver rolls a six on a 1d20… but it has a bonus of +1 because the book begins with a Drizzt journal entry on the importance of fantasy which contains as nice a mission statement for Dungeons & Dragons as I've ever read".
