= The Icewind Dale Trilogy =

Trilogy of epic fantasy novels by R.A. Salvatore

Icewind Dale Trilogy
- The Crystal Shard; Streams of Silver; The Halfling's Gem
- Author: R. A. Salvatore
- Country: United States
- Language: English
- Genre: Epic fantasy
- Publisher: TSR, Inc.; Wizards of the Coast
- Published: 1988–1990
- Media type: Print (paperback)
- No. of books: 3
- Preceded by: The Dark Elf Trilogy
- Followed by: Legacy of the Drow

The Icewind Dale Trilogy is a trilogy of epic fantasy novels by the American writer R.A. Salvatore. The books are The Crystal Shard, Streams of Silver and The Halfling's Gem. They tell the tale of ranger Drizzt Do'Urden the drow (or dark elf), Wulfgar the barbarian warrior, Regis the halfling, dwarf king Bruenor, and Bruenor's adopted human daughter Catti-brie. It is the first of Salvatore's Forgotten Realms novels which introduces some of the best-known characters in that world. The final book of this series, The Halfling's Gem, appeared in The New York Times Best Seller list.

A prequel trilogy, The Dark Elf Trilogy, followed, as did several subsequent sequel series such as Legacy of the Drow and Paths of Darkness.

== Works included ==
- The Crystal Shard (1988)
- Streams of Silver (1989)
- The Halfling's Gem (1990)

In later years, these and other books featuring the character Drizzt Do'Urden have been rebranded as installments of The Legend of Drizzt, and such publications of the Icewind Dale Trilogy are identified on their covers as books IV, V, and VI of that series.

== Characters ==
- Akar Kessell is the former apprentice of Morkai the Red. He is left to die in a bowl-shaped dell of Icewind Dale by Dendybar the Mottled, who tricked Kessel into killing Morkai with promises to become the new head of the mage's guild. He comes across Crenshinibon, which allows him to survive and grants him great power. He commands a large army of creatures (mostly goblins, with lesser numbers of orcs, ogres and giants) and builds a large tower. He also forms an alliance with Errtu, who also seeks the crystal. He is defeated by Drizzt and killed when he teleports the two of them to the base of a mountain only to be buried in an avalanche.
- Errtu is the powerful balor who originally sought the Crystal Shard. After leaving the Abyss, he comes to the Prime Material Plane and stumbles upon Crenshinibon and Akar Kessel-its wielder. Akar, after reminding Errtu of his newfound power, appoints him general of his army. Soon enough, Errtu is magically beckoned by Drizzt Do'Urden, who attempts to trick the balor into thinking he is part of larger drow force whose eyes are set on the Crystal Shard. Once this ruse fails, Errtu attacks Drizzt and Guenhwyvar, but is destroyed in the process and sent back to the Abyss for 100 years of banishment.

== Comic adaptation ==
=== Crystal Shard ===
Following from the comic adaptation of The Dark Elf Trilogy, Devil's Due Publishing continued with the adaptation of Crystal Shard. The second issue (October 2006) earned 20th place and the third issue (December 2006) earned 18th place in the list of top 100 Independent comics for their respective months.

=== Streams of Silver ===
Devil's Due Publishing announced the individual issues for this series would be collected into a trade paperback with Tyler Walpole serving as the cover artist. The series was adapted by Andrew Dabb and pencilled by Val Semeiks. The trade paperback for Streams of Silver was ranked 34 in the top 100 Graphic Novels for August 2007, with an estimated pre-order sale quantity of 2,524.

=== Halfling's Gem ===
The final issue of Halfling's Gem was announced on 18 September 2007 and was shipped in December 2007. The final issue #3 completes the adaptation of Dark Elf Trilogy and Icewind Dale Trilogy.

== Reception ==
The entire trilogy was ranked 9th in Banophernalia's top 10 books for 2000. In the same site, the series was given 3 stars for Crystal Shard and 3.5 stars for Streams of Silver and The Halfling's Gem. It was considered standard enjoyable fantasy fare, although clichéd.

Ian Strelec, staff reviewer for d20zines.com, awarded Streams of Silver a B+ rating. He praised the vivid descriptions and good characterizations in the novel, but was critical of unrealistic situations as well as an overemphasis on combat scenarios.

The last volume of the trilogy, The Halfling's Gem, was ranked 14th in the New York Times paperback best sellers' list on 11 March 1990.

Paul Hughes, in an editorial review of the trilogy on Amazon's website, wrote that, while the book is not Tolkien, it has "brought legions of enthusiastic fans to the genre". The reviewer also stated that it is essential for any "Drizzt true believer".

The Icewind Dale Trilogy appeared on the 2025 Screen Rant "10 Best Forgotten Realms Book Series, Ranked" list at #2.

== Reviews ==
- Science Fiction Chronicle
