= Menzoberranzan: City of Intrigue =

Dungeons & Dragons supplement

Menzoberranzan, City of Intrigue
- Rules required: Dungeons & Dragons
- Character levels: N/A
- Authors: Brian R. James, Eric Menge
- First published: August 21, 2012
- ISBN: 9780786960361

Menzoberranzan: City of Intrigue is a system-neutral supplement to the Dungeons & Dragons role-playing game published towards the end of 4th edition.

== Contents ==
Menzoberranzan: City of Intrigue details the city of Menzoberranzan, populated by the drow. There are six chapters in this book:

1. Campaign of Intrigue
2. The Way of Lolth
3. Drow Factions
4. City of Spiders
5. The Northdark
6. Be a Drow

Shannon Appelcline commented that "Menzoberranzan: City of Intrigue (2012) brings together geographical details of the Realms that were previously available two decades earlier in FOR2: The Drow of the Underdark (1991) and the original Menzoberranzan (1992). It also contains some information simultaneously being published in 'Council of Spiders' (2012). Alongside this reprinted material — covering the setting of Menzoberranzan, the houses of Menzoberranzan, and the drow of the Realms — Menzoberranzan: City of Intrigue also advances the timeline of the city. This includes details on how the War of the Spider Queen (2002-2005) changed the city and totally new material on the Spellplague. The result turns the system-neutral Menzoberranzan supplement into an era-neutral supplement that allows players to run Menzoberranzan in any era, from its 2e origins to the 4e present-day. Some of Menzoberranzan also moves beyond the city into the Underdark that surrounds it: the Northdark. This brings together a number of classic realms, including Mithral Hall from R.A. Salvatore's novels, the ruins of Hellgate Keep from Hellgate Keep (1998), and the Dungeon of Death from Dungeon of Death (2000). Most of the locales in the Northdark are described in just a paragraph or two, but nonetheless the section links the UnderRealms together".

== Publication history ==
Menzoberranzan: City of Intrigue was published on August 21, 2012, as a hardcover book. It was later made available as a PDF or a softcover book through the DMs Guild. Menzoberranzan: City of Intrigue was part of the tenth season of Encounters, Council of Spiders (2012, 8 weeks).

Appelcline wrote that "when Menzoberranzan was first announced in early 2012 as part of the Rise of the Underdark event, it was called a 'Campaign Setting'. That would have made it the fifth Campaign Setting for D&D 4e and the third setting for the Forgotten Realms, following on from Neverwinter Campaign Setting (2011) the previous year. Unfortunately, Wizards had also announced the end of D&D 4e on January 9, 2012 when they told The New York Times that they were working on a new version of the game. Following that, just three more 4e books appeared: Heroes of the Elemental Chaos (2012), Halls of Undermountain (2012), and Into the Unknown: The Dungeon Survival Handbook (2012). Menzoberranzan: City of Intrigue still featured the 4e trade dress, but it was instead published as an edition-neutral supplement, marking the end of the almost-four year reign of D&D 4e (2008-2012). The 'Campaign Setting' probably became a 'City of Intrigue' around the same time, to show how the new book was different from the 4e Campaign books that had preceded it. [...] Like, Neverwinter, the Underdark drow city of Menzoberranzan: City of Intrigue was already a popular locale in the Forgotten Realms. It had first received serious attention in R. A. Salvatore's novel, Homeland (1990). It then was featured in a dense, boxed RPG set called Menzoberranzan (1992); afterward it became the heart of an SSI and DreamForge video game that was also called Menzoberranzan (1994). [...] Menzoberranzan: City of Intrigue (2012) was part of a massive multimedia crossover called Rise of the Underdark, which had begun a few months previous with the final 4e roleplaying supplement, Into the Unknown: The Dungeon Survival Handbook (2012). Menzoberranzan was closely tied to two Rise of the Underdark releases: Encounters Season 10, 'Council of Spiders' (2012) provided a drow PC adventure, while the Drow Treachery Fortune Cards (2012) offered new drow-centric Fortune Cards where players could cause troubles for each other".

== Reception ==
In 2013, Menzoberranzan: City of Intrigue was nominated for three ENnie Awards: "Product of the Year", "Best Setting", and "Best Supplement". The book was also nominated for "Best Roleplaying Supplement" in the 2013 Origins Awards.

John Baichtal of Wired complimented the "particularly excellent" illustrations of the noble families, and stated that "this book is just the resource you need to run a campaign in the city or to inspire you to create your own evil city."

John O'Neill, for Black Gate, wrote "one of my favorite RPG settings of all time is Menzoberranzan, the 1992 boxed set from TSR that drew liberally from R.A. Salvatore's best-selling Drizzt Do'Urden novels. Written by Ed Greenwood, Salvatore, and Douglas Niles, the box detailed the famous City of Spiders, the subterranean birthplace of the drow ranger, in three thick books and a set of gorgeous maps. Packed with 20,000 drow inhabitants, hundreds of thousands of humanoid slaves, and countless secrets and simmering rivalries, the home of the drow was an ideal adventure site for intrepid (and suitably high level) players. Released nearly 20 years ago for second edition AD&D, Menzoberranzan has not seen an update since and has been out of print for over 15 years. It was featured in the popular Menzoberranzan PC game from SSI/DreamForge, part of their Forgotten Realms product line, in 1994, and very prominently in the six-volume War of the Spider Queen novels, but it's been far too long since my favorite underdark city-state appeared in a new edition. The wait is finally over. Wizards of the Coast has released an updated version in Menzoberranzan: City of Intrigue, now available in hardcover".

Marshall Honorof, for The Escapist, wrote "if you're a fan of classic Dungeons & Dragons games, you probably have some fond memories of the Underdark. [...] Rise of the Underdark, the latest D&D campaign, gives Dungeon Masters and players the tools and setting necessary to journey into the bowels of Faerûn in the hopes of thwarting the Spider Queen Lolth and her drow minions - or rolling a drow character and playing D&D in a whole new way. Rise of the Underdark is the latest entry in the history of the Forgotten Realms. When the 4th Edition of Dungeons & Dragons came out in 2008, the Forgotten Realms Campaign Guide was not far behind, and the story has advanced since then in a plethora of sourcebooks, adventure modules, novels, board games, and more. At the outset of Rise of the Underdark, the goddess Mystra, the Queen of Magic, has been missing for a long time. Apart from a brief resurrection in a mortal body, no one has known Mystra's whereabouts ever since her apparent death during the Time of Troubles (Baldur's Gate fans will remember that Bhaal, the Lord of Murder, also perished during this era, kicking off BioWare's memorable series). Never one to pass up an opportunity, Lolth the Spider Queen, patron goddess of the drow, believes the time is ripe to seize Mystra's throne and overrun Faerûn. There are two primary ways to experience this adventure: D&D Encounters or through the regular sourcebooks. [...] If you're already part of a regular group, however, there's no need to rush out and join Encounters thanks to two upcoming sourcebooks: Into the Unknown: The Dungeon Survival Handbook and Menzoberranzan: City of Intrigue. The first book focuses on the mechanics of creating and surviving dungeons, particularly those in the Underdark, while the second deals with the layout, architecture, politics, and adventures waiting in 'the most infamous dark elf city.' Neither one of these books will follow the Lolth story per se, but should give eager DMs and players all the tools they need to descend into the Underdark for adventures of their own. Fewer details have emerged about a new deck of player-oriented Fortune Cards entitled Drow Treachery, but Chris Lindsay, an assistant brand manager, assures players that the title should tell them all they need to know".

Alex Lucard, for DieHard GameFan, commented "I'll be honest: I've never understood the appeal of the Drow at all. They just seemed overly angsty and dark for the sake of being dark. I've been bored by the novels where they are the featured race and I've generally avoided them unless someone is making fun of them. [...] I won't lie – this is a book I will probably never personally use or even open again after this review, simply because the Drow don't interest me. For those that are curious about the Drow to their diehard fans, you'll find a lot to love about this book, as it's exceptionally detailed and contains just about everything you want to know about the Jewel of the Underdark. Let's start off with the most interesting aspect of the book. Menzoberranzan: City of Intrigue tries exceptionally hard to be edition-free. That means whether you're playing First Edition or testing out D&D Next, the book gives you a lot of substance but little to no mechanics, in order to be accessible to all Dungeons & Dragons fans. Sure, when mechanics DO pop up, they are 4e only, but that's to be expected. I personally think the writers of this campaign supplement should be applauded for remembering that each edition of D&D has their own passionate fans, and trying to accommodate them all means more sales for WotC. [...] All in all, if you even remotely interested in the Drow as a race, Menzoberranzan: City of Intrigue is a book well worth picking up. It has a ton of helpful information, beautiful artwork and it strives to be friendly to all four versions of Dungeons & Dragons. If, however, you're not likely to use Drow in an adventure, be it as PCs or antagonists, you really won't get much out of this book except a lot of confusion about how to pronounce a good amount of the words in it. As I said at the beginning of the review, I'm not the least bit interested in the Drow as a race, but I have to admit I was pretty impressed by this book".

Jeff McAleer, for The Gaming Gang, wrote that "one interesting aspect of the supplement is the fact it's rule system neutral and provides information on running the city in any D&D edition – in almost any fantasy role-playing game system actually. [...] The supplement is rife with all one would need to run adventures focusing on the drow and their Underdark city as there's plenty of adventure hooks, campaign ideas, and faction info about the various houses so there's a lot for players and DMs to chew over. Let's start by saying the production quality of Menzoberranzan: City of Intrigue is top notch and makes for a fun reading experience. Nothing seems out of place as far as layout and the artwork ranges from really good to absolutely stunning. Six chapters make up the book and make no bones about it, the focus here is on running a campaign in which drow are the central characters. This might shorten the number of gamers who'll feel a need to purchase the supplement but drow characters, and in reality playing evil characters, is the nature of this beast. [...] All in all there's a lot to really dig with Menzoberranzan: City of Intrigue but the actual value of the source book is going to have a lot to do, at the end of the day, with the person who's plunking down their hard earned ducats. First off, the pricing seems a bit steep for the page count. [...] Second, if you're enjoy the Salvatore Drizzt books or feel the drow are an excellent race to be included in your D&D campaigns picking this supplement up is a no brainer. Also if your gaming gang is up for playing drow, or evil characters in general, this is a great addition to your collection. On the flip side, if none of the above fits your make up there shouldn't be a crushing need to grab Menzoberranzan: City of Intrigue. In fact if you don't like the drow, or don't include them in your gaming, I'd say to take a pass altogether as there isn't going to be enough here to warrant a purchase. Lastly, publishing the supplement as an [sic] non-edition specific book is a bit of a double edged sword for WoTC; on one hand it announces the fact the current edition of Dungeons & Dragons has a limited shelf life and Wizards wants to provide materials that will appeal to gamers looking to take part in the future edition on the horizon while, at the same time, they may be leading to discontent from their core 4th edition gamers because there isn't a shred of info specifically geared to that specific crowd and those mechanics".
