= Menzoberranzan =

Fictional setting in Dungeons & Dragons

- Forgotten Realms location
- Art from the development of the animated short Sleep Sound (2021)
- First appearance: The Crystal Shard (1988)
- Last appearance: Lolth's Warrior (2023)
- Created by: R. A. Salvatore
- Genre: Dungeons & Dragons

In-universe information
- Type: City-state
- Races: Drow, goblins, kobolds, duergar
- Location: Upper Northdark
- Characters: Drizzt Do'Urden, Jarlaxle, Gromph Baenre, Liriel Baenre, Minthara Baenre
- Government: Ruling Council of Menzoberranzan
- Religion: Worship of Lolth

Menzoberranzan, the "City of Spiders", is a fictional city-state in the world of the Forgotten Realms, a Dungeons & Dragons campaign setting. The city is located in the Upper Northdark, about two miles below the Surbrin Vale, between the Moonwood and the Frost Hills (north of the Evermoors and under the River Surbin). It is famed as the birthplace of Drizzt Do'Urden, the protagonist of several series of best-selling novels by noted fantasy author R. A. Salvatore. Menzoberranzan has been developed into a video game (of the same name) and a tabletop RPG setting.

== Creative origins ==
In 1988, the character Drizzt Do'Urden was created by author R. A. Salvatore as a supporting character in the Icewind Dale Trilogy and referenced the character's "years in Menzoberranzan". The prequel series, The Dark Elf Trilogy, features the origin of Drizzt Do'Urden and the main setting is his home city of Menzoberranzan. Salvatore went through old Dungeons & Dragons adventure modules, such as Descent to the Depths of the Earth, Vault of the Drow, and Queen of the Demon Web Pits, for references on the Drow but the Drow were not defined outside of a matriarchal society in the Underdark. Salvatore was given carte blanche to create the entire society within the city. Mario Puzo's The Godfather and the Five Families of New York greatly influenced Salvatore when he created the "super-structure" of the city and helped him create a "logical consistency" for the society.

In 2018, Salvatore said:

Look, I grew up in a sexist, racist society. I grew up in an Italian neighborhood. Have you ever watched The Sopranos? That was my neighborhood. Only without the mob, but that was my neighborhood. It had the same attitudes about life. I grew up with five older sisters, and I saw what they had to endure. And they're also where I got the idea for the bad matriarchal society of Menzoberranzan. [...] I love my sisters dearly. It's funny, because they'll always come up to me and say, "I'm Vierna, right?"

== Publication history ==
=== Forgotten Realms novels ===
==== The Icewind Dale trilogy ====
Menzoberranzan was introduced in The Crystal Shard (1988) as part of the background for Drizzt Do'Urden. Shannon Appelcline (author of Designers & Dragons) wrote that "from the time of that first book of Salvatore's Icewind Dale trilogy, Drizzt was a breakout success, due in no small part to his mysterious origins and his 'years in Menzoberranzan, or in the wilds of the Underdark . . .' With that one sentence, Salvatore ensured that the Underdark would rise up to unseat Deepearth as the collective name for D&D's underground realms—and that fans would want to know more about those realms".

==== The Dark Elf trilogy ====
In September 1990, Salvatore's novel Homeland was released. This was the first novel in the prequel series and was followed by Exile, in December 1990, and then Sojurn, in May 1991. Homeland shows the life and society of Menzoberranzan as Drizzt Do'Urden grows up there. It explores the complex Drow house system in Menzoberranzan along with education system, called the Academy. Cindy Speer, for the SF Site, wrote that "the city is beautifully rendered, a place of danger, as beautiful as a poisonous snake, and the rules of this society are chilling".

Pornokitsch, in their review of Homeland, wrote that "Menzoberranzan is a stunning metropolis - svelte architecture, omnipresent magic and an atmosphere of choking paranoia. [...] It is important to note that the Forgotten Realms are a place of extremely high fantasy [...]. Menzoberranzan is high fantasy to another order of magnitude. Every drow can use magic and their city glows with eldritch power".

While at the end of Homeland Drizzt leaves Menzoberranzan, the city continues to be a secondary location in the trilogy and follows other characters still in the city.

==== Legacy of the Drow series ====
The Legacy of the Drow series, by R. A. Salvatore, was written after the Dark Elf trilogy but chronologically it follows the Icewind Dale trilogy. Menzoberranzan is a secondary location in the first novel, The Legacy (1992) and a major location in the second and third novels, Starless Night (1993) and Siege of Darkness (1994). In The Legacy, this "is the first time Salvatore has 'gone home' so to speak since Drizzt left the Underdark at the end of Exile. [...] The chaotic city of Menzoberranzan hosts part of the story with the unexpected return of a member (or two) of the Do'Urden family. This is the catalyst for the hunt for the blasphemous Ranger who turned his back on his family, race and the Spider Queen".

In Starless Night, Drizzt returns to Menzoberranzan to try to prevent an attack on Mithral Hall. In Siege of Darkness, while Menzoberranzan is heavily impacted by the Time of Troubles and magic going awry, the Drow still plan and then launch an attack on Mithral Hall.

==== Starlight and Shadows trilogy ====
In September 1995, Elaine Cunningham's novel Daughter of the Drow was released and it is set 21 years after Salvatore's novel Sojurn. Unlike Drizzt Do'Urden, the main character Liriel Baenre is prized member of the top house in Menzoberranzan. Similarly to Homeland, it follows Liriel Baenre's early life and her process of escaping the city.

Menzoberranzan continues to be a secondary location in the rest of the trilogy, Tangled Webs (April 1996) and Windwalker (April 2003).

==== War of the Spider Queen series ====
Menzoberranzan appears prominently in the War of the Spider Queen series, particularly as the setting of the first novel in the series Dissolution (2002), as well as Condemnation (2003), Extinction (2004), Annihilation (2004), and Resurrection (2005). The War of the Spider Queen series is written by six authors with two editors; Philip Athans and R. A. Salvatore. The series "returns to Drizzt Do'Urden's homeland, the Underdark, to spin a tale of a ragged band of four dark elves on a desperate quest to find Lloth [sic], drow goddess and the demon Queen of Spiders, and save their subterranean city of Menzoberranzan and the entire dark elf race".

==== Neverwinter Saga ====
Menzoberranzan appears as a secondary location in Charon's Claw (2012), the third novel of the Neverwinter Saga, where "at the beginning of the book, the Drow from Menzoberranzan are plotting to take Gauntylgyrm and the ancient fire being under their own power and have sent out forces to do just that". The release of this book was part of the Wizards of the Coast coordinated marketing campaign called "Rise of the Underdark". A few weeks after Charon's Claw was published, a Dungeons & Dragons sourcebook on the city (Menzoberranzan: City of Intrigue) was also released as part of this campaign.

Salvatore said he came to understand that Artemis Entreri, a main character in the book, "was who Drizzt might have become had he remained in Menzoberranzan. Entreri sees the surface world as wretched and evil as Drizzt viewed his homeland, except for Entreri, there was no escape. So he gave in to cynicism and hopelessness".

==== Companions Codex ====
Menzoberranzan appears prominently in the Companions Codex series by R. A. Salvatore, particularly in the first novel in the series Night of the Hunter (2014). The Drow of Menzoberranzan and Q'Xorlarrin, a settlement in Gauntylgyrm founded by the Menzoberranzan Drow from House Xorlarrin, are plotting war against the surface world because Menzoberranzan is on the brink of civil war and the Drow goddess Lolth is angry at the city. This leads to a conflict called the War of the Silver Marches which continues throughout the rest of the series, Rise of the King (2014) and Vengeance of the Iron Dwarf (2015).

Salvatore said that "the War of the Silver Marches seems straightforward from afar - the orcs of Many Arrows, prodded by the drow, have decided to take on the alliance known as the Kingdoms of Luruar. Up close, however, it gets much more complicated, as the drow tease the frost giants to the side of the orcs, then throw in a couple of dragons (who have their own ulterior motives) for good measure. And of course, at a higher level, we've got a feud between a pair of goddesses, Lolth and Mielikki, kicking up the dust as well".

==== Homecoming trilogy ====
Menzoberranzan appears prominently in the Homecoming series by R. A. Salvatore, particularly in the first two novels Archmage (2015) and Maestro (2016). At the start of the series the War of the Silver Marches is over but the fate of Gauntylgyrm, a satellite settlement of Menzoberranzan, has yet to be decided and "the dwarven kings and their allies are marching to reclaim Gauntlgrym, a dwarven stronghold lost some decades past. [...] Meanwhile, the drow of Menzoberranzan, led by their scheming Matron Mother, Quenthel Baenre, are planning the defence of Gauntlgrym, which they've claimed for their own. The first half of the book deals with what happens before the dwarfs reach Gauntlgrym, and the second half deals with what occurs when the two sides come into conflict. Weaving throughout this tale are a number of disaffected drow, of particular note are Jaraxle, of the Bregan D'aerthe mercenary company, and the eponymous Archmage, Gromph of House Baenre".

Archmage highlights the politics of Menzoberranzan with a focus on the Archmage Gromph Baenre. The events of the book setup the Dungeons & Dragons "Rage of Demons" storyline and the adventure Out of the Abyss (2015) as at the end of the novel, Archmage Gromph Baenre accidentally summons Demogorgon, the Prince of Demons, to Menzoberranzan. The second book, Maestro, deals with the fallout of the "Rage of Demons" storyline in Menzoberranzan with a particular focus on Drizzt Do'Urden returning to the city and the story concludes in Hero (2016).

==== Generations trilogy ====
The Generations series by R. A. Salvatore follows the Homecoming trilogy. In the first novel, Timeless (2018), Menzoberranzan is one of the main locations and "it follows the tumultuous life of Drizzt's father, mentor figure, and idol Zaknafein, both in the past, when his friendship with the infamous mercenary captain Jarlaxle opened the door for his heresy, and in the present, after he is resurrected and reunited with his son". The series continues in Boundless (2019) and is concluded in Relentless (2020).

Salvatore said: "I can tell you that for many years, and a lot of readers have agreed with me, I've said I really wanted to write a book about Zaknafein and Jarlaxle, but before Drizzt was born. How did they get to know each other? What was Menzoberranzan like? [...] So half the book takes place back before Drizzt was born, so I can reintroduce people to the dark elf city, through different eyes. Slightly different perspective on the dark elf city".

=== Dungeons and Dragons ===
==== Advanced Dungeons & Dragons 2nd Edition ====
Ed Greenwood, Salvatore, and Douglas Niles collaborated to release a three-book box set in December 1992 called Menzoberranzan: The Famed City of the Drow. Ashe Collins, for Diehard Gamefan, wrote "originally published by TSR in 1992, following the successful Homeland Trilogy by R. A. Salvatore, which featured the Drow city in great detail there, TSR sought to capitalize on it by providing far more detail to the actual city than they had before for GMs and players, and the Forgotten Realms setting".

The first two books cover the history of the fictional setting, while the final book serves as an adventure module:

- Book One: The City
- Book Two: The Houses
- Book Three: The Adventure

John ONeill, for Black Gate, wrote that "one of my favorite RPG settings of all time is Menzoberranzan, the 1992 boxed set from TSR that drew liberally from R. A. Salvatore's best-selling Drizzt Do'Urden novels. [...] Packed with 20,000 drow inhabitants, hundreds of thousands of humanoid slaves, and countless secrets and simmering rivalries, the home of the drow was an ideal adventure site for intrepid (and suitably high level) players".

Author Jeff LaSala, on the influence of Salvatore's novels, wrote that at a signing he attended in the early 1990s "with my hard-earned and very limited money I also bought the Menzoberranzan boxed set (ahh, back when they still made boxed sets regularly), which detailed the city of Drizzt’s origin. Now Dungeon Masters and players alike could fill their campaigns with feuding noble houses, evil matron mothers, and vile plots, but this time with actual maps of the city and ready-made NPCs. [...] Never mind that I was never able to use much of this stuff in my nerdy Stranger Things-but-in-the-90s D&D group. But that's okay—I still had innumerable hours of thinking up drow-based adventures ahead, whether I'd use them or not".

In November 1999, Drizzt Do'Urden's Guide to the Underdark (1999), by Eric L. Boyd, was released. Appelcline wrote that it "is the single-most comprehensive sourcebook on the realms of the Underdark that lie beneath the Sword Coast. It talks about the major peoples of the Underworld and details dozens of cities, including Menzoberranzan" and that "Boyd's extensive research results in Underdark being full of tiny references. For example, drow cities are drawn from the list in Drow of the Underdark and from obscure references in Menzoberranzan".

A review for Pyramid identifies Menzoberranzan as one of "the most famous pieces of the Realms".

==== 3rd Edition & 3.5 ====
Menzoberranzan is briefly described in the Forgotten Realms Campaign Setting (2001).

==== 4th Edition ====
In the 4th edition Forgotten Realms Campaign Guide (2008), Menzoberranzan is described as a key settlement in the Underdark and features an updated map.

In August 2012, Menzoberranzan: City of Intrigue (2012), by Brian R. James and Eric Menge, was published. This was an edition-neutral campaign setting book and was announced as part of the Rise of the Underdark event. Appelcline wrote that the book includes reprinted material from earlier sources "covering the setting of Menzoberranzan, the houses of Menzoberranzan, and the drow of the Realms" and it "also advances the timeline of the city. This includes details on how the War of the Spider Queen (2002–2005) changed the city and totally new material on the Spellplague. The result turns the system-neutral Menzoberranzan supplement into an era-neutral supplement that allows players to run Menzoberranzan in any era, from its 2e origins to the 4e present-day".

Ed Grabianowski, for Io9, wrote that "the most famous of drow cities hasn't received the splatbook treatment since 2nd Edition. [...] Plus, physically, Menzoberranzan is one of the coolest, most unique fantasy cities ever".

John ONeill, for Black Gate, wrote that after it was released "nearly 20 years ago for second edition AD&D, Menzoberranzan has not seen an update since and has been out of print for over 15 years. It was featured in the popular Menzoberranzan PC game from SSI/DreamForge, part of their Forgotten Realms product line, in 1994, and very prominently in the six volume War of the Spider Queen novels, but it's been far too long since my favorite underdark city-state appeared in a new edition".

Alex Lucard, for Diehard Gamefan, wrote that "all in all, if you even remotely interested in the Drow as a race, Menzoberranzan: City of Intrigue is a book well worth picking up. It has a ton of helpful information, beautiful artwork and it strives to be friendly to all four versions of Dungeons & Dragons. [...] I'm not the least bit interested in the Drow as a race, but I have to admit I was pretty impressed by this book. It may not be for me, but I can't deny how well written and designed this campaign supplement is". Wired included the book on a seasonal gift guide and wrote that "it's a wicked underground city packed full of scheming dark elves and their henchmen and slaves. The illustrations of the noble families are particularly excellent, and you really get a sense of the personalities of these houses. [...] This book is just the resource you need to run a campaign in the city or to inspire you to create your own evil city".

==== 5th Edition ====
In September 2015, Menzoberranzan received a dedicated chapter in the 5th edition book Out of the Abyss (2015). Henry Glasheen, for SLUG Magazine, wrote that the adventure "leads through some of the most famous locations in The Underdark—if such places can be said to be famous. Many players will remember Menzoberranzan, the City of Spiders, but even lesser-known areas such as Blingdenstone and Gracklstugh are fully developed and ready to be explored".

== Fictional description ==
Menzoberranzan is an underground city populated by the drow, and ruled over by the priestesses of Lolth. The city has 20,000 drow inhabitants and hundreds of thousands of humanoid slaves such as goblins, kobolds, bugbears, duergar, svirfnebli, orcs, ogres, minotaurs, and giants, as well as herds of rothé kept as livestock. The city trades poisons, mushrooms, riding lizards, spell scrolls, wine, and water. The worship of Lolth is prevalent, and the city has the clerical academy Arach-Tinilith, a spider-shaped building where priestesses are trained. Arach-Tinilith is one of the three branches of the city's Academy in the Tier Breche section of the city. Arach-Tinilith is neighbored by the warrior school Melee-Magthere, and Sorcere tower where arcane spellcasters are sent to study. These academies are the quarters of some of the most powerful clerics, fighters and wizards, respectively, and the title of master of an academy is coveted, since being the master of Sorcere or Melee-Magthere is as high as the power ladder goes for some houseless drow or even noble males.

On one edge of the city the family houses are located in their glory, while the edge near the lower level Drow houses there is a lake used to water the rothé. An island in the center is used to as an outlook post to help defend the city.

=== Founding ===
Menzoberranzan was founded by a priestess of Lolth named Menzoberra the Kinless in −3917 DR. It is ruled by a council of matrons from the eight greatest noble houses; the most powerful House in the city is House Baenre, until recently led by Matron Yvonnel Baenre—a drow cleric who was the single most powerful political figure in Menzoberranzan for about two thousand years. She has been succeeded by her daughter Triel. A separate council of mages deals with affairs of the arcane—but as its members are all male, it is wholly within the grip of the matrons.

=== History ===
Menzoberra the Kinless, a powerful priestess of Lolth, founded the city that bears her name in −3917 DR. By the wishes of Lady Lolth, she led seven drow families into the Northdark from the southerly drow holdings of Great Bhaerynden. The drow families, having no immediate external enemy, fell to attacking and undermining one another, as was drow nature, to the greater glory of their evil goddess, who so loved chaos. Only fifty years after the city's founding, in −3864 DR, a great and terrible battle between the two most powerful Houses, House Nasadra and House S'sril, occurred. This battle led to the exile of House Nasadra (which later founded the city of Ched Nasad, and was the First House until the city's recent destruction) and to the rise of House Baenre as the First House of Menzoberranzan.

The city's internal machinations have continued unabated for millennia. The Houses that grow weak are destroyed, and newer Houses rise up to find Lolth's favor. The full history of each House would constitute a nearly endless logbook of treachery, spite, and unceasing ambition. Within the last century, this pattern seems to have accelerated. House Do'Urden ascended from the Tenth House to the Ninth House by destroying the Fourth House, House DeVir. It then ascended to the Eighth House with the much-needed help of Jarlaxle's mercenary band Bregan D'aerthe by destroying the Fifth House, House Hun'ett. House Do'Urden lost the favor of Lolth, however, when Matron Malice Do'Urden turned Zaknafein into a spirit-wraith by using Lolth's dread Zin-Carla ritual and failed to kill Drizzt Do'Urden with him. This resulted in House Baenre utterly destroying House Do'Urden.

In 1359 DR, during the Time of Troubles, House Oblodra, the Third House, aspired to be the First House of Menzoberranzan. Menzoberranzan was caught in a magic dead zone, so magic did not work there. House Oblodra, however, was gifted in the rare art of psionics and seized upon this opportunity to strike at the other Houses. The matron of House Oblodra nearly reached her goal, but an avatar of Lolth answered Matron Baenre's pleas for help and came to Menzoberranzan after the Time of Troubles had ended (the drow thought that she herself had restored all magic, but that is not true). Although she loved chaos, she did not wish to see a House that did not whisper prayer to her to rule the city. Foreseeing her temporary loss of power due to the Time of Troubles, Lolth had asked the demon Errtu to protect her worshippers, should she herself fail to do it. In return, Lolth gave Wulfgar over to Errtu as a prisoner, means by which the mighty demon could gain his revenge on Drizzt. She then opened a portal for Errtu and his host of demons to lay siege to House Oblodra. By the time the Time of Troubles had passed, Lolth was restored to full power and single-handedly crushed House Oblodra, the remains of their stronghold being pushed into a deep chasm known as the Clawrift, and Matron Oblodra's spirit went to Errtu for eternal torment. Thus the ranks of the ruling Houses changed once again. All this she said was done for her greatest high priestess (although it was really done for herself), the two-thousand-year-old Matron Baenre. All Houses in the city witnessed this great miracle and knew that House Baenre was the most favored House of the goddess.

== Key factions ==
There are three types of factions in Menzoberranzan. At the top are the Houses with the eight greatest houses forming the Ruling Council of Menzoberranzan; "the council determines the fate of the city, from the ranking of each house to whether an errant house must be destroyed. Drow factions that more or less uphold the social order of Menzoberranzan are the second category. These include the academy of Tier Breche and the mercenary company of Bregan D'aerthe. [...] The third group of factions consists of various internal and external forces opposed to the social order of Menzoberranzan".

=== Houses of Menzoberranzan ===
The Houses "control all aspects of the city, from enforcing its few laws to dominating trade. Menzoberranzan has no standing army. Instead, the house guard of each of the noble houses provides the military might of the city. Their compounds are heavily fortified castles". Menzoberranzan has about 50 Houses which are all vying to increase their power and their ranking in the city as only the top eight Houses are part of the Ruling Council. The Houses all follow the same loose leadership structure: "the house matron mother (the dictatorial ruling female head of the house), first priestess (typically the matron mother's eldest daughter, who supervises the day-to-day operations of the house), house wizard (the leader of the house's arcane spellcasters), house weapon master (who trains and leads the house warriors), and patron (the favored consort of the matron mother, who holds the highest rank possible for a male drow)".

The following are the topmost houses of Menzoberranzan:

1. Baenre
2. Barrison Del'Armgo
3. Oblodra (destroyed by demons serving Yvonnel Baenre and, indirectly, Lolth in DR1358, described in Siege of Darkness)
4. DeVir (destroyed by Do'Urden in DR1297, described in Homeland)
5. Hun'ett (destroyed by Do'Urden in DR1338, described in Exile)
6. Faen Tlabbar
7. Xorlarrin
8. Agrach Dyrr (became a vassal of House Baenre in DR1372 in the outcome of the War of the Spider Queen)
9. Mizzrym
10. Do'Urden (destroyed by Baenre in DR1340, described in Exile)
11. Fey-Branche
12. Tuin'Tarl
13. Duskryn
14. Srune'Lett
15. Horlbar
16. Kenafin
17. Druu'giir
18. Hunzrin
19. Shobalar
20. Vandree
21. Symryvvin
22. A'Lavallier
23. Sel'rue

Menzoberranzan Houses hierarchy timeline

Unknown ranking

- Freth [destroyed in 1319 DR] ("Homeland")
- Teken'duis [destroyed in 1319 DR] ("Homeland")
- Hekar ("Starless Night")
- Catanzaro ("Dragon228")
- Despana ("Dissolution")
- Pharn ("Realms Personalities")
- Coloara ("Realms Personalities")
- Simfray [destroyed in DR1018 by Bregan D'aerthe] ("Timeless")
- Tr'arach [destroyed in DR1018 by Zaknafein Simfray] ("Timeless")

=== The Academy ===
Tier Breche, the famed academy of the dark elves, sits on a high plateau at the western end of the city, protected by guardians and fell magics, the Academy consist of three structures, Arach-Tinilith (The School of Lolth) Sorcere (The School of Wizards) and Melee Magthere (The School of Fighters). Presided over by the Matron Mistress of the Academy, all drow both common and noble are required to attend the academy. Students' length of education is dependent on their sex and occupation. Male Fighters will spend 10 years, male wizards will spend 30, and female priestesses will spend 50 years learning their profession. The majority of time is spent within their specific school, but each student will spend a portion of their last year at each of the other schools, gaining a basic understanding of the strengths and weakness of the other classes.

Melee Magthere

The School of Fighters is a pyramidal structure located on the east side of Tier Breche. Here males learn the art of swordplay, and individual and group fighting tactics. Beginning students spend their first sixty days unarmed under the instruction of The Master of Lore. Here they are indoctrinated against surface elves and non-drow. This racist propaganda provides a 'safety valve'- extra aggression can be turned on the surface folk, rather than (completely) on the Drowish hierarchy. Their junior years are very harsh, but conditions improve as they grow older. Students in their 9th and final year serve as guards for Tier Breche, as well as participating in practice patrols within short distances outside of the city cavern. Each year, in order to establish a hierarchy within the class, the Grand Melee is held. During this event the students are set loose in a maze chamber outside the city cavern, wielding simple wooden poles as imitation weapons. The last male standing wins. In the tenth and final year, fighters will spend their first six months in Sorcere studying magic, and the final six months within Arach-Tinilith learning the precepts of Lolth - most importantly, the inferiority of males in her eyes.

Sorcere

The School of Wizards is housed in a many spired stalagmite tower on the west of Tier Breche. Males will spend 30 years in study of the arcane arts, learning to channel the strange and unique magic of the drow that emanates from the Underdark. Acceptance as a student at Sorcere is highly coveted by young males as magic is the only path to any kind of real power in their matriarchal world. Masters of Sorcere are arguably the most powerful group of males within Menzoberranzan, headed by the city's Archmage. Not only are they responsible for the training of future mages but also for regulating the use of arcane magic for all drow within Menzoberranzan.

Arach-Tinilith

The School of Lolth is one of, if not the most important, holy sites within the church of Lolth. Standing at the center of Tier Breche, the school resembles a giant obsidian spider, sporting eight legs and a large central hall. Female clerics will spend 50 years in study under the Mistresses of Arach-Tinilith, learning the deeper codes, beliefs, and dogma of Lolth's faith. Some of the most powerful holy artifacts of the drow are stored within the halls. It is here that students will undergo the graduation ceremony, often involving demon summoning and sexual orgies between the new clerics and male wizards or fighters, reinforcing the subservient role of drow males. The Matron Mistress of the Academy resides here and serves both as head instructor as well as the leader of the academy. Currently the Academy is presided over by Matron Mistress Quenthel Baenre, who succeeded her sister Matron Triel after the death of their mother.

=== Bregan D'aerthe ===
Bregan D'aerthe is a drow mercenary band based in the drow stronghold of Menzoberranzan and appears in many R. A. Salvatore novels. Founded by Jarlaxle Baenre as a means for houseless rogues to survive in Menzoberranzan, the group has thrived and expanded greatly since its inception. Due to its array of skilled soldiers and its many connections with the outside world, Bregan D'aerthe is a valued ally of many powerful drow houses. More than once in various novels, it has been remarked that Jarlaxle is one of the most protected drow in the Underdark due to the competent soldiers he surrounds himself with. This band of societal malcontents consists of approximately 150 members (though at times known to employ many more, having nearly one thousand agents at work with the Calimport initiative), mainly houseless males. Bregan D'aerthe has been very influential in the chaotic happenings of Menzoberranzan and has connections with Blingdenstone and has agents in Ched Nasad as well as major cities on the surface, most notably Luskan, Waterdeep, Calimport, and Heliogabalus. It was led by Jarlaxle Baenre, up until Servant of the Shard and is currently led by the drow psionicist Kimmuriel Oblodra.

"...no house desired conflict with Bregan D’aerthe. It was the most secretive of bands, few in the city could even guess at the numbers in the group, and its bases were tucked away in the many nooks and crannies of the wide cavern. The company's reputation was widespread, though, tolerated by the ruling houses, and most in the city would name Jarlaxle among the most powerful of Menzoberranzan's males". - Starless Night "...in Menzoberranzan, Jarlaxle and his spying network, Bregan D'aerthe, had no equal". - Starless Night

== Reception ==
Menzoberranzan has been described as "a perfect unjust state" and compared to Glaucon's vision of a state that is held together only by the fear of retribution.

In the Io9 series revisiting older Dungeons & Dragons novels, in his review of Homeland, Rob Bricken says that "where Homeland really shines—what hooked me as a kid, and what I still find fascinating now—is how thoroughly Salvatore examines drow society and the city of Menzoberranzan. From the cult of Lolth, the spider-goddess, to the matriarchal houses constantly scheming to destroy the others, to their equally Machiavellian education system, to the brutal class structure, Salvatore explores it all. He gives equal attention to the architecture and art of Menzoberranzan, and he's gained enough skill to describe it with aplomb. What would look like utter darkness to us is a world of vivid color for the drow, whose nightvision (the D&D term for being able to see the infrared spectrum) is unparalleled. It's augmented by magic and the elves' ability to shape stone into works of art, ornate houses, and more".

== In other media ==
=== Board games ===
- In 2011, the Legend of Drizzt Board Game was released. The adventure book in the game is inspired by the R. A. Salvatore novels and "the first adventure, Exile, is inspired by the book of the same name and features Drizzt's journey from Menzoberranzan to the surface".
- In 2016, the Tyrants of the Underdark board game was released. Players act as competing Drow houses trying to take control of locations in the Underdark such as Menzoberranzan and Blingdenstone.

=== Video games ===
- The city was the main location of the video game Menzoberranzan (1994). Dungeons and Desktops: The History of Computer Role-Playing Games said "the last TSR-licensed game SSI published is the infamously wretched (and hard to spell) Menzoberranzan, which appeared in 1994 for DOS. [...] [It] had all the ingredients necessary for a hit. [...] Nevertheless, gamers quickly complained about the endless number of boring battles that drag out the game and ruin its pacing".
- In 2015, players in the MMO Neverwinter could accompany Drizzt to Menzoberranzan during its demonic assault in the Underdark Campaign. In 2023, the game's Neverwinter: Menzoberranzan module featured the city as a new adventure zone and campaign.

=== Miscellaneous ===
- In 2014, Matt Hummel's essay Menzoberranzan: A Perfect Unjust State appears in Dungeons & Dragons and Philosophy, a new volume in Wiley-Blackwell's long running Philosophy and Pop Culture series. Hummel "uses the infamous Drow city to discuss notions of justice and injustice".
- Sleep Sound (2021) is a poem by R. A. Salvatore which received an animated short to promote the "Summer Of Drizzt" marketing campaign. The short features Menzoberranzan; it was narrated by Benedict Cumberbatch and animated by The Sequence Group.
- Dungeons & Dragons: Honor Among Thieves (2023) producer Jeremy Latcham stated that the city seen at distance in the Underdark portion of the film was intended to be Menzoberranzan – Latcham commented that "I don't know if we actually ended up leaving it that on the map, but when we designed it originally, that was going to be Menzoberranzan. There was some controversy about it based on where we were with Dolblunde, which was kind of a made-up place".

== See also ==
- Menzoberranzan (video game)
- Underdark
