= Matt James (game designer) =

American game designer

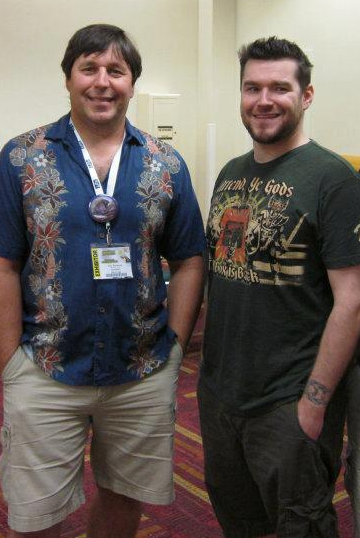
- Matt James (right) with R. A. Salvatore
- Born: Matt James
- Occupations: Army veteran, game designer
- Writing career
- Genres: Role-playing games, fantasy, science-fiction
- Notable works: Red Aegis RPG, Rogue Spartan, Into the Unknown: The Dungeon Survival Handbook, Soldiers of Fortune, Monster Vault: Threats to the Nentir Vale
- Website: www.dnd.co

Matt James is an American game designer and a decorated veteran of the United States Army. As a game designer, James is best known for his online and print works for the Dungeons & Dragons fantasy role-playing game published by Wizards of the Coast, Pathfinder role-playing game by Paizo, and Privateer Press. He has also designed game content for Wolfgang Baur's Kobold Press (formerly Open Design LLC). In 2012 James won an ENnie Award for Monster Vault: Threats to the Nentir Vale and has been nominated for several Origins Awards. In 2014, James won an ENnie Award for Pathfinder Roleplaying Game: Bestiary 4.

== Game design career ==
James began designing games at a young age while writing content for a live action roleplaying game called Avalon LARP. After his service in the military, he began designing professionally. He received his first break when he was asked to fill in for another designer for a Dungeons & Dragons adventure that would be published in Dungeon Magazine. From there, he would regularly contribute to Dragon Magazine and Dungeon Magazine. Since then, James has co-authored many Dungeons & Dragons and Pathfinder products, including the award-winning sourcebook Monster Vault: Threats to the Nentir Vale (2011).

James and his older brother Brian R. James have teamed up to produce additional content for the Forgotten Realms as well as D&D as a whole. They have announced that they are moving forward with their long-established game company Vorpal Games.

== Honors ==
- 2012: Monster Vault: Threats to the Nentir Vale wins a Silver ENnie Award for Best Monster/Adversary product.
- 2012: Monster Vault: Threats to the Nentir Vale is nominated for Best Roleplaying Supplement or Adventure by the 38th Annual Origins Awards.
- 2014: Pathfinder: Bestiary 4 wins a Gold ENnie Award for Best Monster/Adversary

== Bibliography ==
=== Red Aegis RPG products, Vorpal Games ===
- Red Aegis Roleplaying Game (2016), lead developer

=== Pathfinder RPG products, Paizo Publishing ===
- Pathfinder Roleplaying Game: Ultimate Equipment Guide (2012), designer
- Pathfinder Roleplaying Game: Bestiary 4 (2014), designer - ENnie Award winner

=== Dungeons & Dragons RPG products, Wizards of the Coast ===
- Fortune Cards: Drow Trechery (2012), lead designer
- Into the Unknown: The Dungeon Survival Handbook (2012), designer
- Lair Assault: Attack of the Tyrantclaw (2012), designer
- Monster Vault: Threats to the Nentir Vale (2011), designer - ENnie Award winner

=== Kobold Press ===
- Soldiers of Fortune (2011), designer

=== Privateer Press ===
- Iron Kingdoms: Full Metal Fantasy (2012), designer
- Iron Kingdoms: Unleashed (2015), designer

== Military ==
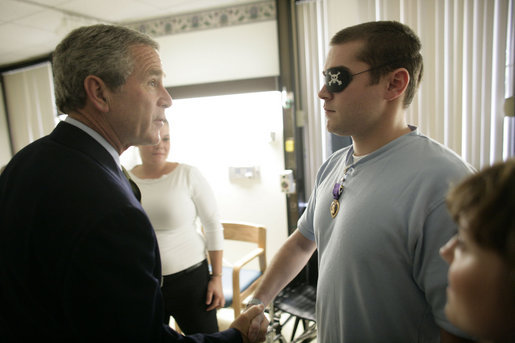
President Bush awards the Purple Heart to Matt James.

After the US invaded Iraq, James enlisted and served as a paratrooper in the United States Army from 2003–2006. While deployed to Iraq in 2005, James earned the Bronze Star Medal for saving the life of a US Marine who was critically injured after being shot with a M2 .50 caliber automatic machine gun. President George W. Bush would later award the Purple Heart to James after he was severely wounded on a separate mission. James was medically retired from military service due to the wounds he suffered during combat operations, and now lives in the Washington, DC area where he focuses on game design and advocacy for disabled veterans.
