= The Dark Elf Trilogy =

1990–91 book trilogy by R. A. Salvatore

- Homeland; Exile; Sojourn
- Author: R. A. Salvatore
- Country: United States
- Language: English
- Genre: Epic fantasy
- Publisher: TSR, Inc./Penguin Books; Wizards of the Coast
- Published: 1990–1991
- Media type: print (hardcover and paperback) audiobook
- Followed by: Icewind Dale Trilogy

The Dark Elf Trilogy is a prequel to the Icewind Dale Trilogy by R. A. Salvatore. Drizzt Do'Urden, a drow, or dark elf, was originally written as a supporting character in the Icewind Dale Trilogy to Wulfgar the barbarian. However, the author soon realized how popular the character was, and Drizzt became the main character. The final book Sojourn made The New York Times Best Seller list.

== Works included ==
The trilogy consists of:

1. Homeland (1990) — Homeland follows the story of Drizzt from around the time and circumstances of his birth and his upbringing amongst the drow (dark elves). The book takes the reader into Menzoberranzan, the drow home city. From here, the reader follows Drizzt on his quest to follow his principles in a land where such feelings are threatened by all his family including his mother Matron Malice.
2. Exile (1990) — Exile tells the story of Drizzt outside of the drow cities in the open wilderness of the Underdark. For the ten years following his abandoning his house, he is left with no one but his faithful Guenhwyvar, a magical panther he had acquired in Homeland. Drizzt is also met with great dangers that he meets with the business ends of his scimitars. Struggling with conflicting emotions, which involve his failure in Menzoberranzan and a deep grief for his father and friend Zaknafein, he makes his way to the surface to face newer dangers.
3. Sojourn (1991) — Sojourn is the story of Drizzt coming to the surface of the world and facing adversity due to the infamy of his kin. It follows him trying to find his place among the humans that live between the city of Sundabar and Citadel Adbar. He is rejected, and hunted, before meeting and living with an elderly blind man known as Montolio DeBrouchee. Montolio teaches Drizzt what it means to become a ranger and together they defend Mooshie's home against a raid by local orcs. Drizzt ultimately leaves the Sundabar area and makes his way to Icewind Dale where he befriends Catti-brie and Bruenor Battlehammer and finds a place to call home.

== Characters ==
- Roddy McGristle is a human bounty hunter, and has two dogs that he uses to hunt and wields an axe named "Bleeder." He seeks out the bounty on Drizzt, who kills one of the dogs and injures the other. Roddy's ear is lost and face is scarred when he chops down a tree with his axe – he persists in telling everyone that Drizzt injured him. He begins to follow any rumors based upon Drizzt in order to get revenge upon him, using the deaths of the Thistledowns as an excuse to get men to help. In actuality he cares little for the Thistledowns and later doesn't even care for the bounty, partly because it was determined that Drizzt was not involved in their murder. Making the grudge personal, he eventually tracks Drizzt down to Icewind Dale, but Roddy is easily defeated, though Drizzt could not bring himself to end the man's life. He is then driven from the mountain by Bruenor and is never heard from again.
- Clacker is a pech, who is transformed into a Hook Horror by a human wizard. Under the effects of this spell, he forgets his name, much of his past, and eventually his mind begins to transform into that of a mindless beast. He meets Drizzt and Belwar Dissengulp as they journey through the Underdark. The three sought the wizard that cast the spell on Clacker; however, Clacker unwillingly killed him when a comment from the wizard drove him into a primal rage from his Hook Horror instincts. He eventually has a moment of resurgence, where he becomes more in-tune with the earth than a regular pech. He uses his abilities to save his friends, and then asks them to kill him before he completely turns. He is killed by Zaknafein, and his body, having returned to its true form, is placed into a pool of acid.
- Belwar Dissengulp is a former burrow-warden of the svirfneblin, another humanoid race in the Underdark. Ten years prior to the events of Exile, Drizzt was part of a raiding party of Menzoberranzan who attacked a mining party of svirfneblin, led by Belwar. Again Drizzt's merciful nature showed, and he convinced his group to let Belwar live (using the excuse that he could serve as a warning to the svirfneblin against venturing so close to Menzoberranzan). However, Drizzt's brother, Dinin, decided to sever both his hands as an example. 10 years pending Drizzt's self-imposed exile, he ventured into the svirfneblin city of Blingdenstone, where he requested to speak with Belwar, whose hands had been replaced with a magical hammer and pickaxe. The former burrow-warden decided to take Drizzt into his home and keep responsibility for him, knowing that he owed his life to him. When Drizzt was forced to leave the city (the city fearing the drow hunting him), Belwar decided to join him in his adventures through the Underdark, and only left when Drizzt told of his intentions to go to the surface.
- Kellindil A wood elf, and part of Dove Falconhand's group, he meets Drizzt and attacks him assuming him the enemy, though pending the Drow's retreat and lack of violence toward him he suspects Drizzt's good intentions. He then keeps an eye on Drizzt during the time he spent with Mooshie. He and his elves arrive in time to offer some help in the attack from King Graul and his orcs. He finds Roddy and takes him captive intending to question him. However Roddy is freed and kills him.
- Montolio DeBrouchee is an aging Human ranger, nicknamed 'Mooshie.' Though he was blinded in a battle against a dragon, he learned to utilize his other senses, as well as his connection with nature, to make up for his disability. He is the one who discovered Drizzt's true calling as a Ranger and taught him how to embrace it and make use of his abilities. Soon before Mooshie's death, he coerced a promise from Drizzt to try to find a place in the world instead of lingering in the forest alone; as Mooshie died in his sleep, Drizzt honored his lost friend by keeping his promise.

== Comics ==
The books have been adapted into comic book form by Devil's Due Publishing. The artist for the comic series Tim Seeley with Andrew Dabb as the writer under the supervision of R.A. Salvatore. The adaption of Homeland, volume 1, received a positive review from George Galuschak of Kliatt magazine, who said, "I am not a big sword & sorcery buff, but I enjoyed this graphic novel. The plot is easy to follow: you don't need a Forgotten Realms encyclopedia at your side to understand what's going on." The trade paperback Sojourn, volume 3 of the Dark Elf ranked 19 in the August 2006 Graphic Novels sales with an estimated sale quantity of 3,465.

== Reception ==
Homeland received a positive review from critic Cindy Speer from SF Site. She stated the novel was an impressive start to the characterisation of Drizzt.

On March 26, 1991 Sojourn debuted at 13 of the New York Times Best Seller list. Ian Strelec awarded the final book of the trilogy, Sojourn with a B+ rating. He stated he found the book short and although not incredible, it was an important component of the Drizzt mythos.

The Dark Elf Trilogy appeared on the 2024 Game Rant "31 Best Dungeons & Dragons Novels, Ranked" list at #1.

The Dark Elf Trilogy appeared on the 2025 Screen Rant "10 Best Forgotten Realms Book Series, Ranked" list at #1.
