= Brian R. James =

American game designer

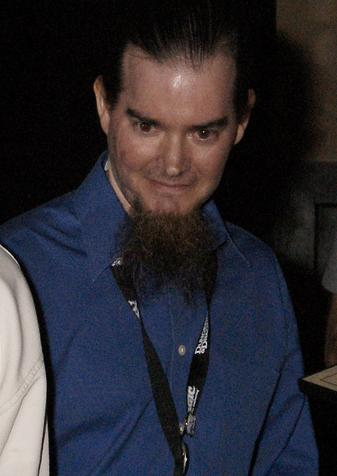
- Brian James at the 2012 ENnie Awards
- Born: November 26, 1974 (age 51) Philadelphia, Pennsylvania, United States
- Occupation: Game designer, software engineer
- Genre: Role-playing games, fantasy, sci-fi
- Years active: 1996–present
- Notable awards: ENnie Awards: Best Monster/Adversary [Silver] (2012)

Brian R. James (born 1974) is a game designer and software engineer. As a writer, Brian is best known for his online and print works for the Dungeons & Dragons fantasy role-playing game published by Wizards of the Coast. In game design circles, Brian is highly regarded for his deep knowledge of the Forgotten Realms campaign setting and its extensive history. In 2012 Brian won a Silver ENnie Award for Monster Vault: Threats to the Nentir Vale and he has been nominated for other ENnie Awards and Origins Awards.

== Personal life ==
Brian grew up in Arapahoe County, Colorado and attended Arapahoe High School where he led the computer club and lettered in cross country his senior year.

== Writing career ==
James got his first big break with the creation of his "Grand History of the Realms" timeline compilation that started in the late 90s. Utilizing his website at the time, he compiled lore from many disparate sources into easily referenced PDFs documents that allowed fans to reference each of his entries. This work eventually caught the eye of senior Wizards of the Coast developers, was purchased by the company and then published as a print sourcebook: The Grand History of the Realms. Since then, James has gone on to co-author (and contribute) to many 4th Edition D&D products, including the award-winning sourcebook Monster Vault: Threats to the Nentir Vale (2011).

He later led the design of Menzoberranzan: City of Intrigue (2012), covering the sinister underdark metropolis famous for birthing the drow Drizzt Do'Urden. James continues to contribute to Dragon and Dungeon magazines; focusing primarily on content for the Forgotten Realms and Planescape fantasy settings.

In 2013 James teamed up with his younger brother Matt James to form Vorpal Games. Their first independent venture is the RED AEGIS Roleplaying Game. A number of artists and designers have been linked to the project, including industry legend Ed Greenwood. RED AEGIS was funded via a Kickstarter campaign in August 2013 that raised $66,254 from 823 backers.

In 2017 James transitioned from tabletop game design into electronic game design, compiling lore for the EverQuest franchise, and the PlanetSide franchise.

== Honors ==
- 2013: Menzoberranzan: City of Intrigue is nominated for an ENnie Award in 3 categories:

Best Setting, Best Supplement, and Product of the Year.

- 2013: Menzoberranzan: City of Intrigue is nominated for Best Roleplaying Supplement by the 39th Annual Origins Awards.
- 2012: Monster Vault: Threats to the Nentir Vale wins a Silver ENnie Award for Best Monster/Adversary product.
- 2012: Monster Vault: Threats to the Nentir Vale is nominated for Best Roleplaying Supplement or Adventure by the 38th Annual Origins Awards.
- 2009: Brian's article Playing Dhampyr (Dragon Magazine #371) is selected to be published in the 2009 Dragon Magazine Annual
- 2008: Grand History of the Realms is nominated for Non-Fiction Publication of the Year by the 34th Annual Origins Awards.

== Video games ==
Year	Title	Role(s)
2020	PlanetSide franchise	Loremaster / Narrative Designer
2017-2018	EverQuest franchise	Loremaster

== Bibliography ==
=== Pathfinder sourcebooks, Paizo Publishing ===
- Pathfinder 2E Gamemastery Guide (2020), designer
- Pathfinder 2E Bestiary 2 (2020), designer
- Giants Revisited (2012), designer

=== RED AEGIS sourcebooks, Vorpal Games ===
- RED AEGIS Roleplaying Game (2016), lead designer/publisher

=== Iron Kingdoms sourcebooks, Privateer Press ===
- Iron Kingdoms Unleashed: Wild Adventure (2016), designer

=== Dungeons & Dragons sourcebooks, Wizards of the Coast ===
- Menzoberranzan: City of Intrigue. (2012), lead designer
- Monster Vault: Threats to the Nentir Vale. (2011), designer - ENnie Award winner
- Demonomicon. (2010), designer
- Underdark. (2010), contributor
- Dragon Magazine Annual. (2009), contributor
- Open Grave: Secrets of the Undead. (2009), designer
- Forgotten Realms Campaign Guide. (2008), designer
- Grand History of the Realms. (2007), lead designer

=== Magazine articles ===
- Corvis Codex: Plagues and Pestilence, No Quarter #52 (2014)
- Ecology of the Modron, Dragon #414 (2012)
- Demonomicon of Iggwilv: Shemeshka the Marauder, Dungeon #205 (2012), co-author
- Chessenta, Dungeon #178 (2010)
- Deities & Demigods: Torog, Dungeon #177 (2010)
- Vaasa, Dungeon #177 (2010)
- Monument of the Ancients, Dungeon #170 (2010), co-author
- Sarifal, Dragon #376 (2009)
- Ecology of the Sharn, Dragon #373 (2009)
- Playing Dhampyr, Dragon #371 (2009)
- Hall of the Frostmaiden, Dragon #367 (2008)
- Cormyr, Dragon #365 (2008)
- Spellplague: The Wailing Years, Dragon #362 (2008)
- Grand History of the Realms: The Moonshaes, Dragon #362 (2008)
- Ironfang Keep, Dragon #361 (2007)
- Age of Sail, Part I, Candlekeep Compendium Volume IX (2007)
- Reign of Dragons, Candlekeep Compendium Volume IV (2005)

== Patents ==
- Web-based visual development environment, co-inventor

== Podcasts ==
- The Tome Show 205 Menzoberranzan: City of Intrigue (12/03/2012)
- The Tome Show 178 Monster Vault - Threats to the Nentir Vale (06/30/2011)
- The Tome Show 143 Demonomicon (07/28/2010)
