= Lisa Smedman =

Canadian science fiction and fantasy novelist

- Born: North Vancouver, British Columbia, Canada
- Occupation: Novelist
- Writing career
- Period: 1997 -
- Genres: Science fiction; fantasy
- Notable work: Extinction
- Website: lisasmedman.wixsite.com/author

Lisa Smedman is a science fiction and fantasy author and journalist. Her novel Extinction, set in the Forgotten Realms universe, was a New York Times bestseller. Smedman first became known for gaming adventure novels, and later published her own independent fantasy novels.

== Background ==
Smedman was born and raised in North Vancouver, British Columbia, Canada. She earned a Bachelor of Arts Degree in anthropology from the University of British Columbia and a journalism diploma from Langara College in Vancouver.

After her first job as a typesetter for a local publisher, Smedman has spent her whole career working as a reporter and editor at Vancouver-area weekly newspapers. She has worked at the Richmond Review, the Langley Times, and Sounder magazine. She has written extensively on local history, having worked as an editor at the Vancouver Courier writing local history articles, and having published two non-fiction books on the history of Vancouver.

Smedman lives in Richmond, British Columbia.

== Writing ==
Smedman is one of the most prolific authors of science fiction and fantasy gaming tie-in novels in Canada. She first began writing stories in elementary school. In 1981, she discovered Dungeons & Dragons and soon became a Dungeon Master.

By 1987, Smedman had become convention spokesperson for the 15th year of the Vancouver Science Fiction Convention (V-Con), the annual convention of the British Columbia Science Fiction Association. The Convention attracted about six hundred people.

In the late 1980s, Smedman began to write for Dragon magazine. This enabled her to write her first gaming adventure for TSR, Inc.—the creators of Dungeons & Dragons—in 1993. After Dragon's Crown was released, Smedman wrote ten more adventures for TSR in the next three years. In 1993 she was a finalist in the Writers of the Future contest.

Smedman's first novel, The Lucifer Deck, was set in the Roc Books Shadowrun universe and was published in 1997. Smedman used her own childhood experiences with homosexuality to fashion a child protagonist who, after changing into a magical creature and being rejected by her family, finds herself homeless on the streets. Although Smedman says that her family is supportive and loving, "I have known people who came out as gay in their teens and were utterly rejected by their families. Because I'm also gay, it's easy for me to imagine what they must have felt."

Smedman wrote eight more books after The Lucifer Deck. Extinction, set in Wizards of the Coast's Forgotten Realms universe, made The New York Times Best Seller list in 2004. She also wrote the novel The Playback War, set in FASA's Vor: The Maelstrom universe.

In 2004, Smedman's tenth novel appeared. It was her first entirely independent work. The Apparition Trail is an alternate-history fantasy which posits an 1884 Western Canada where the power imbalance between the First Nations and European settlers exists in a universe with magic and alternate physics.

== Books ==
=== Forgotten Realms ===
- Heirs of Prophecy 2002
- Venom's Taste (House of Serpents, book one) 2004
- Viper's Kiss (House of Serpents, book two) 2005
- Vanity's Brood (House of Serpents, book three) March 2006
- House of Serpents: A Forgotten Realms Omnibus (This omnibus collects all three volumes of the House of Serpents trilogy: Venom's Taste, Viper's Kiss, and Vanity's Brood.)
- Extinction (War of the Spider Queen, book four) January 2004
- Sacrifice of the Widow (The Lady Penitent, book one) March 2007
- Storm of the Dead (The Lady Penitent, book two) out August 2007
- Ascendency of the Last (The Lady Penitent, book three) June 2008
- The Gilded Rune 2012

=== Shadowrun ===
- The Lucifer Deck
- Blood Sport
- Psychotrope
- The Forever Drug
- Tails You Lose

=== VOR: The Maelstrom ===
- The Playback War

=== Other novels ===
- The Apparation Trail 2004
- Creature Catchers March 2007

=== Non-fiction ===
- From Boneshakers to Choppers: The Rip-Roaring History of the Motorcycle
- Vancouver: Stories of a City
- Immigrants: Stories of Vancouver's People
