= The Lady Penitent =

Novel series by Lisa Smedman

The Lady Penitent is a series of novels by Lisa Smedman, set in the Forgotten Realms campaign setting based on the Dungeons & Dragons fantasy role-playing game.

== Plot summary ==
The Lady Penitent takes place after the events of War of the Spider Queen, ranging from 1372 DR to 1379 DR. Several fairly large realm-changing events take place during this series, ranging from the use of Elven High Magic on the drow race to the death of several deities.

== Contents ==
- Sacrifice of the Widow (paperback, February 2007, ISBN 978-0-7869-4250-3)
- Storm of the Dead (paperback, August 2007, ISBN 978-0-7869-4701-0)
- Ascendancy of the Last (paperback, June 2008, ISBN 978-0-7869-4864-2)
