= Minthara =

- Baldur's Gate character
- Minthara as she appears in Baldur's Gate 3
- First game: Baldur's Gate 3 (2023)
- Designed by: Mohamed Abdelfatah (face); Wiktoria Kubien (hair)
- Voiced by: Emma Gregory
- Motion capture: Emma Gregory

In-universe information
- Race: Drow
- Class: Paladin
- Home: Menzoberranzan

Minthara Baenre is a character from the 2023 Baldur's Gate 3, a role-playing video game developed by Larian Studios set in the Forgotten Realms universe of Dungeons & Dragons. Voiced by Emma Gregory, she is a drow Paladin in service of the game's antagonist, and acts as a central villain for the game's first act. Depending on the player's actions, she can be recruited as a companion in the game's second act, and can be romanced if the player chooses to do so. Outside of video games, she has appeared on cards for Magic: the Gathering.

Minthara went through several iterations during development of the game, developed by lead writer Adam Smith with help from her voice actress to have a "pragmatic" approach to evil but also a vulnerable side and demonstrating a degree of awkwardness and compassion. Several bugs in the game however affected how players perceived her character, with one in particular preventing a large amount of her in-game dialogue from being able to play. Another resulted in players being able to find a "work around" to bypass her related quest by knocking her out with non-lethal damage, bypassing the loss of several companions if one wished to recruit her. Smith found it fit the game's narrative, and a simplified version of the workaround was added as an option in a later patch.

Minthara received mostly positive reception upon release, in particular for the portrayal of drow culture in the game but also her role as a strong female character that did not require a redemption arc. However, response was more varied when compared to other companions in the game, with media outlets questioning if it was worth the effort when the game sharply penalized players. Some outlets felt the use of workarounds to be able to fully enjoy the game and her character was a shortcoming of how the latter was handled, while others felt the official implementation of an option to bypass the hard moral choices undermined her character and the player's commitment.

== Conception and development ==
Her appearance and attire changed significantly during development. The earliest design (pictured) was later reused for her Magic: the Gathering card's art.

Written by Baldur's Gate 3 lead writer Adam Smith, Minthara is a drow, a matriarchal race of elves with grey skin, white hair, and red eyes. One of the game's available companions the player can recruit, she was intended as a "sidekick" character, her role in the story was in part meant to shed a different light on one of the game's major villains. Due to this, unlike other available companions she was excluded from the array of "Origin" options the player could choose at the start of the game. Her personality was meant to portray a paranoid individual with depth, displaying "tenderness" and a deep caring for individuals. Initially under the control of the game's antagonist, a telepathic monster called "The Absolute", she was written to behave in a chaotic manner and as a "blunt weapon" for its use. According to Smith, after being freed, her character arc was meant to portray her shift into a more "pragmatic" approach to evil, "somebody who picks her targets very carefully". To illustrate this, they wrote her to question the player why they kept her alive if they choose to, and to distrust the player's character if they do evil actions without proper justification. While Smith did not want to portray her as having a "redemption arc", he did want to illustrate her as "softening" to the idea of working with a group, and enjoyed player's positive reactions towards her character.

After release, Larian Studios discovered that an oversight caused a significant amount of Minthara's dialogue to be disabled. In an interview with IGN, the game's director Swen Vincke felt this may have negatively impacted how players perceived the character, and fixed it as quickly as possible. While initially the player was intended to do a particular evil act to recruit Minthara as a companion, players found options to get around killing her for the "good" path of that particular quest by exploiting a bug in the game where if she was knocked out instead of killed, the quest would complete as if she were dead. Though she would become unresponsive if encountered later, players discovered if they used two spells in conjunction, "Polymorph" and "Dominate Beast", they could transform her into a sheep companion temporarily, and then bring her to a point in the game where it would allow the player to recruit her normally. After reading a webcomic that made light of the bug, Smith felt it made sense in the game's narrative that she would survive if knocked out, and in a later patch they allowed players to simply knock her out and recruit her later, bypassing the original intended path in a much simpler manner.

=== Design and voice ===
Once Minthara's appearance was defined by the concept art team, 3D artist Mohamed Abdelfatah created the design for her face, while Wiktoria Kubien created her hair. Abdelfatah worked directly with lead character artist Alena Dubrovina, who allowed the modelling team to make any additional changes they felt were needed from the concept art. The design went through several iterations during three years of development, and the finished models served as the basis for all subsequent art of the character. Her hair is tied into a bun on the back of her head, while a small black spider web tattoo is on the left side of her neck. She has two primary outfits in the game, a set of full banded armor, and a secondary leather clothing set consisting of pants and a top with a plunging neckline.

Minthara's motion capture and voice was provided by Emma Gregory. She worked with Smith to try and explore the character, trying to learn the character's background while working to avoid portraying her as a "stone cold bitch". Gregory further added that the two of them tried to find ways the characters could be awkward, vulnerable and softer, and felt the two of them were able to create "someone much more interesting" than just an "evil route" character. However she found the motion capture quite difficult due to having to learn the technique, in part because it was new to her but also because they wanted to keep the character's movements "small" to fit her role as a servant to the villain, and later more free as her character arc progresses.

== Appearances ==
Minthara Baenre is a drow woman first introduced in the roleplaying game Baldur's Gate 3. Originally as a Cleric class character, she was changed in a later patch during the game's early access period into a Paladin. In the game's first of three acts, she leads a band of goblins and other creatures in service of the game's antagonist, "The Absolute", in search of an artifact. This brings her into conflict with a refugee settlement called the Emerald Grove, and the player may either help her raid it or oppose and kill her and her goblins. If the player sides with her, the player can choose to sleep with her after the slaughter, though this action will cause several companions to leave and prevent several quests. Afterwards, she will try and kill the player due to a crisis of faith. If the player talks her down, she informs the player of her departure to The Absolute's headquarters, Moonrise Towers, and encourages the player to follow her. Alternatively, the player may avoid the raid entirely and keep her alive by either knocking her out with non-lethal damage while killing her commanders or ignoring her entirely, though this option will cause the grove to be slaughtered off-screen. Any of these options will allow her to proceed to the game's second act.

In the second act, once the player reaches Moonrise Towers they find that she has been put on trial for failing to secure the artifact, and is set to have her mind erased. The player can rescue her, after which she will become a full companion and a romance option if you helped with the raid. She will additionally give more information about her background, divulging that she came from the Underdark, an underground location in the Forgotten Realms setting, and was a paladin in the service of the drow deity Lolth. After killing an envoy of the Absolute's minions that approached her family house, Minthara and her troops attacked the Absolute's headquarters. However, her men were killed by one of the game's three major villains, Orin, and she was brainwashed into serving the Absolute. After she is freed from the Absolute's control, she seeks revenge against it and its allies.

Outside of video games, the character was included on cards for Magic: the Gathering's "Commander Legends: The Battle For Baldur's Gate" set, appearing on both a regular and a special "showcase" card. However, because they were produced during Baldur's Gate 3's early access period, the artwork was based on an earlier version of her character design, while the cards themselves still list her class as "Cleric".

== Critical reception ==
Since her debut, response to Minthara has been mostly positive. In an interview with IGN, Vincke noted that during the game's early access period they could see how many players started a romance with Minthara, and were surprised by the large number, stating "There's certainly people that have had no moral scruples." Media outlets were a bit more mixed. Jasmine Gould-Wilson in an article for GamesRadar+ described the choice of killing the Grove to recruit her as a question of "would you risk it all for the favor of one person? And just how bad could things get if you did?" She further noted that prior to meeting the character she couldn't comprehend why someone would take that avenue, and the impact and ramifications of recruiting her fundamentally changed the tone of her playthrough. GameSpot's Jason Rodriguez, however, felt the cost was too steep, as it prevented the player from recruiting certain characters entirely, and was an example of how the title severely punished players for attempting an "evil" playthrough. This was further compounded in his eyes by reports of a lack of development for the character in the later stages of the game, in particular the title's third act. Though Rodriguez acknowledged than a "workaround" existed in the game, he felt it was "gamey", and stated that belief that "the fault lies in how the character was conceived and included." Andrew Zhou of ScreenRant criticized the patch that allowed players an alternative means to recruit her, feeling it undercut the player's commitment to the character, observing that players tend to avoid options that require "evil" actions in games. He further argued that it took away an aspect that made her one of the most unique companions and romances in he game in his eyes.

When comparing the available companions in Baldur's Gate 3, the staff of PC Gamer rated Minthara the lowest, acknowledging that while she was "hot", the cost of recruiting her by killing innocent characters in the game felt too steep. Associate editor Ted Litchfield did, however, praise the effort that went into her character, stating that developing a full companion and all the resources devoted to it and her story arc for a character that "at least 60% of players would kill is a big part of why Baldur's Gate 3 is such a historic [role playing game]." Matthew Byrd of Den of Geek was more favorable towards Minthara when comparing her to other characters, though found it difficult due to the significant detriments of recruiting her and how much one was tied to an "evil" playthrough of the game in order to do so. Despite acknowledging she was a "tough sell" for some players, he praised her depth and called her one of "the most well-rounded, well-written, and capable" companions. The Mary Sue writer Jack Doyle, meanwhile, considered her his favorite companion in the game, praising both the character and her romance, as well as the fact that unlike other characters, she was a developed villain. He closed with stating "you’re gonna have to do some pretty dastardly things to get Minthara [...] Was it worth it? Yes. I’d resurrect everyone I killed just to stick a knife in them a second time for Minthara to look my way."

In terms of other aspects of her character, Kotaku's Ashley Bardhan praised her characterization and dialogue for providing a deeper glimpse into Drow culture in Dungeons & Dragons lore, particularly in regards to their sexual orientation and treatment of men. She noted that Minthara's own attitudes were not as narrow, adding that doing so allowed the character to not only be "a physically powerful woman, but, more importantly, an interesting character". Harvey Randall, in an article for PC Gamer, enjoyed how Minthara represented the pragmatic "Lawful Evil" alignment in Dungeons & Dragons, doing evil actions for practical reasons but also found "the idea of doing so just for the heck of it wasteful, if not downright distasteful". He felt it a nice departure from how games tended to handle evil characters, either portraying them as bloodthirsty monsters or encouraging the player to try and "fix" and redeem such characters. The latter point was explored more by IGN's Rebekah Valentine, who, when examining the concept of a "problematic fave" in gaming, a character whose heinous actions players justify due to admirable or desirable qualities, cited Minthara as the most egregious example in Baldur's Gate 3. Liana Ruppert of Game Informer, however, was highly critical of her character, describing her as "kind of a jerk", stating that on playthroughs where she did recruit Minthara, she found herself starting the game over shortly after. She further added "Just like any good role-playing adventure, there are good choices, bad choices, and choices that make you feel like you need a cold shower. Minthara is the latter two".
