= Exile (Salvatore novel) =

1990 novel by R. A. Salvatore

- Cover of the first edition
- Author: R. A. Salvatore
- Cover artist: Jeff Easley
- Language: English
- Series: The Dark Elf Trilogy
- Genre: Fantasy
- Set in: Forgotten Realms
- Publisher: TSR
- Publication date: 1990
- Publication place: United States
- Media type: Print (Paperback)
- Pages: 320
- ISBN: 978-0880389204 (first edition)
- OCLC: 23000817
- Dewey Decimal: 813.54
- LC Class: PS3569.A4625 E94
- Preceded by: Homeland
- Followed by: Sojourn

Exile is a fantasy novel by American writer R. A. Salvatore, the second book in The Dark Elf Trilogy. It was published in 1990.

== Plot introduction ==
Exile follows Drizzt Do'Urden to the wilds of the Underdark. For the ten years following his abandoning his house, he is left with no one but his faithful Guenhwyvar, a magical Panther he had acquired in Homeland. He is also met with great dangers that he meets with the business ends of his scimitars. Struggling with conflicting emotions, which involve his failure in Menzoberranzan and a deep grief for his father Zaknafein, he makes his way to the surface to face newer dangers.

== Plot summary ==
Drizzt spent some years in the Underdark, during which he was enslaved by mind flayers and then had to fight Zaknafein again, who had been made undead by Malice, thanks to Lolth's "greatest gift" Zin-Carla, to find Drizzt. In the end, Zaknafein regained enough control to sacrifice himself, flinging his body into a pool of acid.

For Malice's failure to use Zaknafein to kill Drizzt, Lolth decreed that house Do'Urden should be destroyed, and House Baenre, the most favored First House of Menzoberranzan, did just that, with only Vierna and Dinin surviving.

== Reviews ==
- Review by Mark Caswell (1991) in Fear, June 1991
- Review by Andy Sawyer (1991) in Paperback Inferno, #90
- SF Site
