= Monster Vault: Threats to the Nentir Vale =

2011 role-playing game supplement

- Genre: Role-playing game
- Publisher: Wizards of the Coast
- Publication date: June 2011
- Media type: Print
- Pages: 128
- ISBN: 978-0-7869-5838-2

Monster Vault: Threats to the Nentir Vale is a supplement to the 4th edition of the Dungeons & Dragons role-playing game. Bart Carroll, Producer at Wizards of the Coast, wrote: "In this book, you'll find a codex of monsters and villains to throw at the heroes as they explore every nook and cranny of the Nentir Vale or, by extension, your home campaign setting".

== Contents ==
This 128-page book contains statistics, tactics, and lore for new monsters of the Nentir Vale. The softcover book also came with eight "die-cut sheets of card stock monster and villain tokens and a double-sided battle map featuring four different encounter locations".

Shannon Appelcline, author of Designers & Dragons, wrote: "there are about 200 monsters in Threats to Nentir Vale, and the vast majority of them are for the Heroic Tier. Less than 20% are Paragon Tier monsters, and there are no epic monsters at all. The toughest monster in the book is Shadowmire, at level 19, which is probably why he's on the cover. [...] Though most of the monsters are unique builds that are part of organizations, there are also a few classic monsters making their reappearance in 4e".

== Publication history ==
Monster Vault: Threats to the Nentir Vale was published by Wizards of the Coast in June 2011 and it was the third post-Essentials book for the 4th edition. The book was re-released as a PDF on October 06, 2015. It was written by Sterling Hershey, Brian R. James, Matt James, and Steve Townshend and illustrated by Dave Allsop, Peter Bergting, Zoltan Boros, Eric Deschamps, Matt Dixon, Wayne England, Adam Gillespie, Ralph Horsley, Twozdai Hulse, Mari Kolkowsky, Howard Lyon, Jim Nelson, Steve Prescott, Vincent Proce, Wayne Reynolds, Jon Schindehette, Anne Stokes, Gábor Szikszai, Matias Tapia, Ben Wootten, and Kieran Yanner.

Appelcline highlighted that Monster Vault: Threats to the Nentir Vale was released after a "grim" Q1 2011 where multiple books had been canceled. It followed the release of Heroes of Shadow (April 2011) and The Shadowfell: Gloomwrought and Beyond (May 2011) when there was confusion on what the line looked like post-Essentials.

There were several key differences in format and style between this book and the previous Essentials line:

- "Threats to Nentir Vale wasn't packaged in a box, but instead in a cardstock sleeve that was shrinkwrapped to keep everything inside."
- "The book wasn't digest-sized (like the Essentials books). In fact, it wasn't hardcover either (like the core books). Instead Threats to Nentir Vale was a softcover release, representing yet another format for a 4e line that was growing increasingly chaotic. (Its size and format actually matched the Shadowfell books, but they were in a box.)"
- "Though it's formatted just like Monster Vault, Threats to Nentir Vale is actually a very different sort of Monster Manual. That's because it mostly focuses on monstrous factions not individual monster types."
- The die-cut sheets of tokens "revealed another minor change in formatting for the D&D 4e line: where the Essentials tokens were glossy, the Threats to Nentir Vale tokens were matte-finished instead."

== Reception ==
Monster Vault: Threats to the Nentir Vale won the 2012 Silver ENnie Award for "Best Monster/Adversary".
