= Homeland (Salvatore novel) =

1990 novel by R. A. Salvatore

- Cover of the first edition
- Author: R. A. Salvatore
- Cover artist: Jeff Easley
- Language: English
- Series: The Dark Elf Trilogy
- Genre: Fantasy
- Set in: Forgotten Realms
- Publisher: TSR
- Publication date: December 1990
- Publication place: United States
- Media type: Print (Hardcover, Paperback)
- Pages: 352 (Paperback)
- ISBN: 0880389052
- OCLC: 22514626
- Dewey Decimal: 813.54
- LC Class: PS3569.A4625 H65
- Followed by: Exile

Homeland is a fantasy novel by American writer R. A. Salvatore, the first book in The Dark Elf Trilogy, a prequel to The Icewind Dale Trilogy. It follows the story of Drizzt Do'Urden from the time and circumstances of his birth and his upbringing amongst the drow (dark elves).

The book takes the reader into Menzoberranzan, the city of drow that is Drizzt's homeland. From here, the reader follows Drizzt on his quest to follow his principles in the cruel and competitive society of his underground homeland where such feelings are threatened.

== Plot summary ==
Drizzt was born to the tenth noble House of Menzoberranzan, Daermon Na'shezbaernon (more commonly known as House Do'Urden). He was the son of Malice, the Do'Urden Matron Mother and her consort, Do'Urden weaponmaster (and sometime Patron) Zaknafein. As the third son, drow culture demanded that Drizzt be sacrificed to their goddess Lolth. However, the death of his older brother, and the first son, Nalfein, (incidentally, at the treacherous hand of the second son, Dinin) in the battle against House DeVir which raised Daermon Na'shezbaernon to the 9th ranked in the city during his birth, made him the second son and spared him.

Being a male in the matriarchal drow society, Drizzt Do'Urden suffered considerable abuse at the hands of his family, particularly his eldest sister Briza, in the first sixteen years of his life. His first ten years were spent as a page prince in the care of his sister Vierna; though she was far from kind, in his later years Drizzt would recall some affection for her, stemming from the fact they shared paternity through Zaknafein.

As a child, Drizzt displayed amazing reflexes and coordination. Consequently, Zaknafein was able to persuade Malice that Drizzt should become a warrior, instead of replacing Nalfein as the house wizard. Thus, at the age of sixteen, Drizzt began his weapons training. He began learning the skills that would lead him to become one of the most formidable swordsmen in both the Underdark, and Faerûn.

At twenty years of age, he went to the Academy, specifically Melee-Magthere, Menzoberranzan's warrior academy, where he excelled in his studies despite his resistance to the attempted brainwashing by the masters of the academy. When it was clear that there were none in Drizzt's class who could beat him, the masters of the academy matched him against students three years above him. Drizzt defeated that class easily. His time at the academy would have been perfect (by Drow standards) except for the graduation ceremony, where he disgraced himself by not taking part in a ritual, refusing the advances of two high priestesses, one of them his sister, Vierna, and damning Lolth. Vierna, angered by Drizzt's defiance, showed him what happened to those who defied the Spider Queen: she took him to a drider's lair. She started to leave him there, but Drizzt's mother interfered and saved Drizzt from certain death by the driders. She threatened to turn Drizzt into one of the hideous creatures if she heard of any more defiance from him. He graduated with honors, even though he did not participate in the ceremony. He believed that no one really noticed his absence from the ceremony because the others were wrapped up in the moment.

He began patrolling the Underdark with his assigned patrol group. He witnessed first hand the cruelty his race showed the other races of the Underdark. Not long after graduation, he took part in a surface raid in which he saved the life of a child of the most bitter enemy of the drow, the surface elves, by hiding her body underneath the corpse of her murdered mother. Zaknafein, having similar morals to Drizzt, believed he had killed the child, but Lolth knew he allowed the child to survive and House Do'Urden fell out of the Spider Queen's tenuous favor. Zaknafein, fearing that Drizzt had succumbed to the evil ways of the drow, fought with Drizzt, and was told the truth of the matter by his son. Upon hearing Drizzt say that he had no part in the murder of the surface elves, Zaknafein became ecstatic, and revealed that Drizzt was indeed his child. They planned to escape House Do'Urden and live in the caverns of the Underdark. Unfortunately, Matron Malice and her daughters, in a bid to find out why Do'Urden was no longer in Lolth's favor, were watching. They knew that the only way to rectify the situation was to offer Drizzt up as a sacrifice to Lolth. Malice informed Zaknafein of the plan to sacrifice their son, and to stop it from happening, Zaknafein offered himself to replace Drizzt. This was Malice's intention all along. She believed that once Zaknafein was dead that Drizzt would begin behaving like a proper drow noble, and would take the position of weapon master with pride. When Drizzt learned of his father's demise, he confronted Matron Malice. She told him, cruelly and with much delight, that Zaknafein had been sacrificed to Lolth in order to regain the Spider Queen's favor. She told Drizzt that he was to serve as the house's new weapon master. Drizzt refused outright and, using one of Zaknafein's weapons - an exploding ball of light - escaped into the Underdark.

== Characters ==
- Drizzt Do'Urden, male drow
- Dinin Do'Urden, Drizzt's brother
- Malice Do'Urden, Drizzt's mother
- Zaknafein Do'Urden, weaponsmaster of the House Do'Urden
- Nalfein Do'Urden, Drizzt's brother
- Belwar Dissengulp, Svirfneblin burrow warden

== Reception ==
Homeland received a positive review from critic Cindy Speer. She stated the novel was an impressive start to the characterization of Drizzt.

Pornokitsch, in their review of Homeland, wrote that "Mr. Salvatore displays tiny fragments of being able to write the drow as a compelling race, but abandons these efforts and indulges himself in making them as evil as possible instead. The result does no favors to either Drizzt's character or the book as a whole."

The comics adaption of Homeland, volume 1, received a positive review from George Galuschak of Kliatt magazine, who said, "I am not a big sword & sorcery buff, but I enjoyed this graphic novel. The plot is easy to follow: you don't need a Forgotten Realms encyclopedia at your side to understand what's going on."

Homeland was #7 on CBR's 2020 "10 Of The Best DnD Stories To Start Off With" list — the article states that "The reason that this novel is a great starting point for those interested in D & D beyond featuring Drizzt's origin, is that it greatly fleshed out Drow's society. The novel's worldbuilding does not only provides insight to those wanting to play as a Drow but provides great ideas for background for characters from races traditionally portrayed as evil like Orcs and Kobolds."

In the Io9 series revisiting older Dungeons & Dragons novels, Rob Bricken commented that "It was unlike any other Dungeons & Dragons novel I'd read at the time, and I'm pretty sure it still is—and that includes the other book in the Dark Elf trilogy, Exile and Sojourn. I have no idea if that will change as I start getting into the novels I didn't read as a kid, but for now, I say Homeland rolls a critical hit—a natural 20. It's as good as I suspect a classic D&D novel to get, but I am very willing to be proven wrong."

== Reviews ==
- SF Site
