= Sojourn (novel) =

1991 novel by R. A. Salvatore

- Cover of the first edition
- Author: R. A. Salvatore
- Cover artist: Jeff Easley
- Language: English
- Series: The Dark Elf Trilogy
- Genre: Fantasy
- Set in: Forgotten Realms
- Published: TSR, May 1991
- Publication place: United States
- Media type: Print (Paperback)
- Pages: 309
- ISBN: 1-56076-047-8
- OCLC: 23832662
- Dewey Decimal: 813.54
- LC Class: PS3569.A4625 S64
- Preceded by: Exile

Sojourn is a fantasy novel by American writer R. A. Salvatore, the third book in The Dark Elf Trilogy. It was published in 1991.

== Plot summary ==
Having lived in the Underdark for over forty years, Drizzt realized that neither he nor anyone around him would be safe, so he decided to travel to the surface. There he met with much adversity because of his race, but also found his true calling in life as a ranger, during his time with a blind ranger named Montolio. He eventually moved to Icewind Dale, where he joined with Catti-Brie, Bruenor Battlehammer, Regis the Halfling, and Wulfgar the barbarian.

== Reception ==
On March 26, 1991 Sojourn debuted at 13 of The New York Times bestseller list. Ian Strelec awarded the final book of the trilogy, Sojourn with a B+ rating. He stated he found the book short and although not incredible, it was an important component of the Drizzt mythos.

According to PopMatters' Andrew Welsh, Drizzt is Salvatore's attempt to create a multifaceted character who faces internal struggles, in hopes of standing out from the drow, and fantasy fiction in general. Welsh feels that Salvatore fails in this regard, saying "any blood Drizzt finds on his hands is quickly justified and most “internal” conflict is superficial at best."

The trade paperback Sojourn, volume 3 of the Dark Elf Trilogy ranked 19 in the August 2006 Graphic Novels sales with an estimated sale quantity of 3,465.
