= War of the Spider Queen =

Series of Forgotten Realms novels

- Covers of the six novels in the series, illustrated by Gerald Brom
- Author: Richard Lee Byers; Thomas M. Reid; Richard Baker; Lisa Smedman; Philip Athans; Paul S. Kemp
- Cover artist: Gerald Brom
- Country: United States
- Language: English
- Genre: Fantasy; Dungeons & Dragons
- Publisher: Wizards of the Coast
- Published: 2002–2005
- Media type: Print (Hardback & Paperback)
- No. of books: 6
- Preceded by: The Legend of Drizzt
- Followed by: Empyrean Odyssey (2007–2008) trilogy; The Lady Penitent (2007–2008) trilogy

War of the Spider Queen is a fantasy series of novels set in the Forgotten Realms universe published by Wizards of the Coast. The series contains six books focused on the drow and their principal deity Lolth. Each of the six novels in the series is written by a different author with veteran Forgotten Realms author R. A. Salvatore overseeing the project. Cover art for each book in the series was designed by Gerald Brom who has done other Forgotten Realms work including reprints of The Avatar Series.

== Publication history ==
The start of the six-book series War of the Spider Queen was released as part of Wizards of the Coast's "Year of the Drow" multimedia event in 2002. This event also included the City of the Spider Queen (2002) adventure module and R. A. Salvatore's novel The Thousand Orcs (2002).

According to Salvatore, the idea for the series was that of his editor Philip Athans, who also wrote the fifth book of the series. Athans had to convince Salvatore to sign onto the project, and it was the idea that Salvatore "could help some other writers get some much-needed exposure" that won the author over. Salvatore and fellow authors Richard Baker, Thomas Reid, and Richard Lee Byers along with Athans and others then met in Seattle to compile the main overview of the storyline. Afterwards, Salvatore became the content editor, mostly ensuring that content within the drow city of Menzoberranzan "kept the place where I wanted it for future works." Game designer Rich Baker commented that he and James Wyatt "were present in the original planning sessions with Bob Salvatore, Richard Byers, Thomas Reid, and Phil Athans as the whole War of the Spider Queen plan was hammered out, so the game guys and book guys were able to put together a common plot that everyone was happy with".

The two War of the Spider Queen gift sets

In September 2006, Wizards of the Coast released the War of the Spider Queen series in two separate gift sets featuring Gerald Brom's artwork on the exterior of the boxes. Graphic design for the gift sets was done by Lisa Hanson and Matt Adelsperger. Shannon Appelcline commented that the 2012 "Rise of the Underdark" multimedia event by Wizards of the Coast was "foreshadowed with the re-release of War of the Spider Queen" which was reprinted as an omnibus edition "in April and May of that year". The new edition was titled R.A. Salvatore's War of the Spider Queen Volume I and Volume II with the first volume collecting the first three novels and the second volume collecting the last three novels.

=== Authors ===
The War of the Spider Queen series is written by six authors with two editors, Philip Athans and R. A. Salvatore. Authors like Richard Lee Byers and Athans had already adventured into the world of Forgotten Realms with their writing while for others like Lisa Smedman and Thomas M. Reid, War of the Spider Queen was their first real foray into Forgotten Realms writing. On the back cover of each book is a quote from Salvatore, a short excerpt of his opinion on the author of the novel.

=== Books in the series ===
Year	Title	Author	Pages	ISBN
2002	Dissolution	Richard Lee Byers	372	ISBN 0-7869-2714-3
2002	Insurrection	Thomas M. Reid	365	ISBN 0-7869-2786-0
2003	Condemnation	Richard Baker	375	ISBN 0-7869-3202-3
2004	Extinction	Lisa Smedman	371	ISBN 0-7869-3596-0
2004	Annihilation	Philip Athans	373	ISBN 0-7869-3752-1
2005	Resurrection	Paul S. Kemp	369	ISBN 0-7869-3981-8
Collected editions
2006	R. A. Salvatore's War of the Spider Queen Gift Set, Books 1–3	Richard Lee Byers, Thomas M. Reid, Richard Baker		ISBN 0-7869-2944-8
2006	R. A. Salvatore's War of the Spider Queen Gift Set, Books 4–6	Lisa Smedman, Philip Athans, Paul S. Kemp		ISBN 0-7869-3596-0
2012	R. A. Salvatore's War of the Spider Queen, Volume I (collects Dissolution, Insurrection, Condemnation)	Richard Lee Byers, Thomas M. Reid, Richard Baker	1072	ISBN 978-0-7869-5986-0
2012	R. A. Salvatore's War of the Spider Queen, Volume II (collects Extinction, Annihilation, Resurrection)	Lisa Smedman, Philip Athans, Paul S. Kemp	1074	ISBN 978-0-7869-6028-6

Since the completion of War of the Spider Queen, two series continuing the stories of certain characters from the series were developed by authors involved in the original series. Thomas M. Reid, author of Insurrection, continued the story of the half-demons Aliisza and Kaanyr Vhok in The Empyrean Odyssey trilogy. Its first installment, The Gossamer Plain, was released in May 2007; the second book, The Fractured Sky, was released in November 2008; and the finale, The Crystal Mountain, was published in July 2009. Lisa Smedman, who developed the character Halisstra Melarn heavily in Extinction, continued the story of the drow priestess in The Lady Penitent trilogy; the first two books, Sacrifice of the Widow and Storm of the Dead, were released in 2007, while the third, Ascendancy of the Last, was released in June 2008.

== Plot summary ==
=== Dissolution ===
The background of the series takes place in the matriarchal Drow society of Menzoberranzan, the ancestral underground city of the Drow, in the year 1372 DR (Dale Reckoning). Lolth, goddess of the Drow, has gone silent and is no longer affording spells to her priestesses. The females attempt to keep this a secret, but soon they are found out, and males begin disappearing from the city for unknown reasons. Pharaun Mizzrym, a magic user, and Ryld Argith, a warrior, are sent by the Archmage of Menzoberranzan, Gromph Baenre, to discover the cause of these missing drow. The two are attacked several times by Pharaun's sister Greyanna, who is in a power struggle for her household, and trying to kill Pharaun for aligning with their other sibling. Pharaun and Ryld press on, and discover a group of renegade males who are planning a hostile takeover of the city using the thousands of kobold, goblin, and bugbear slaves of the city as their army. When the duo attempt to infiltrate the renegades' base they are captured by its leader, the Illithid Lich Syrzan. Using his magic and trickery Pharaun escapes and leaves behind Ryld, who manages to fight his way out of the hideout. In a sub-plot, an emissary from the Drow city of Ched Nasad, Faeryl Zauvirr, is attempting to leave Menzoberranzan. Matron Mother Triel Baenre forbids this, and has Faeryl captured and tortured by her Draegloth son, Jeggred Baenre. The insurrection of the males is crushed by the physical and arcane strengths of Menzoberranzan, and the city remains under female control. Concerned that others may gather the courage to attempt another take over, Triel sends a group to discover the cause of Lolth's silence and bring an end to it, first by traveling to Ched Nasad. The group is made up of Triel's sister Quenthel, her son Jeggred, Master of Sorcere Pharaun Mizzrym, Master of Melee-Magthere Ryld Argith, a mercenary named Valas Hune, and the emissary Faeryl Zauvirr, in order to secure ties within Ched Nasad.

=== Insurrection ===
The group of six travel to Ched Nasad, a neighboring Drow city headed by House Melarn. Along the way, the group are attacked by a group of Tanarukks, minions of the warlord Kaanyr Vhok. Leading them is Aliisza, an insatiable Alu-Fiend, who takes an instant liking to the powerful, witty, and attractive Pharaun Mizzrym. When they reach Ched Nasad, the city is in unrest and upheaval, and Quenthel discovers that Lolth has abandoned Ched Nasad as well. As an ulterior motive for sending the group to Ched Nasad, Triel had ordered them to retrieve goods co-owned between House Melarn and House Baenre. Ambassador Faeryl Zauvirr betrays the group to her mother Ssipriina Zauvirr, head of a Mercantile House in Ched Nasad that works for House Melarn. Ssipriina Zauvirr has developed a plot to overthrow Matron Mother Drisinil Melarn, and have her house ascend to become one of the ruling Houses in Ched Nassad. Matron Mother Drisinil Melarn is tricked by Ssipriina Zauvirr and Quenthel and Jeggred Baenre are taken captive while in the warehouse holding the goods. Valas, Ryld and Pharaun meanwhile, off on their own missions, are eventually convinced to join the others at House Melarn in the belief they are being held as guests. There they meet Halisstra Melarn and Danifae Yauntyrr, the daughter of the Matron Mother and her battle captive. Soon after arriving at House Melarn, the city comes under attack from a clan of Duergar, and Pharaun, Ryld and Valas are able to rescue Quenthel and Jeggred. House Melarn is destroyed, but the group escape along with Halisstra after Jeggred kills Faeryl, and Pharaun saves Danifae from dying in the rubble of the house. The city is utterly destroyed in the attack, which is actually planned and executed by Zammzt, a member of the Jaezred Chausslin. The group escapes the destruction, and Halisstra along with Danifae join their group to find the cause of Lolth's silence.

=== Condemnation ===
The group, now seven strong, plan a trip to Lolth's domain, the Demonweb Pits. They travel along the surface to seek the followers of Vhaeraun, male Drow who seek to overturn female dominance. Halisstra is captured by followers of Eilistraee, but she kills her captors and escapes, where she is found by followers of Vhaeraun. Quenthel asks the High Priest of Vhaeraun for assistance, and after a test he agrees to bring the group's spirits to the Demonweb Pits along with himself. When they reach Lolth's domain, she is blocked off inside a construct, and will not answer their prayers. The priest then betrays them by gating Vhaeraun into the Pits, where he plans to kill Lolth and become the dominant Drow deity. Selvetarm, Lolth's protector, engages in battle with Vhaeraun, during which Jeggred kills the priest and the group is sent back to the temple of Vhaeraun. They decide to go back to the Underdark, where they will make another attempt to contact Lolth in the Abyss.

The other part of the book focuses on a mysterious drow named Nimor Imphraezl, the so-called "Anointed Blade" of a group called the Jaezred Chaulssin. Nimor incites two groups—the legions of the warlord Kaanyr Vhok and the duergar army of Horgar Steelshadow—into attacking the drow at Menzoberranzan, taking advantage of Lolth's silence. First the Lichdrow Dyrr imprisons the Archmage Gromph Baenre, doling out another blow to the city's magical strength. Then Nimor, acting as a drow commander from Agrach Dyrr, informs Triel Baenre of the invasion, who sends the Army of the Black Spider to the Pillars of Woe to defeat the duergar invasion before they reach Menzoberranzan. The army is sent into a trap as the Legions of Kaanyr Vhok join the duergar, along with House Agrach Dyrr, who turn on their own people to obliterate a third of the drow army.

=== Extinction ===
The main focus of Extinction is on the journey of Ryld Argith and Halisstra Melarn in the world above, as well as the siege of Menzoberranzan. After abandoning the group, Halisstra and Ryld run into followers of Eilistraee once again; however, Halisstra, being shaken in her faith in Lolth, joins the Eilistraeens' order. The two fall in love, an emotion normally unknown to the drow. After killing a spider, an unforgivable act in pure defiance of Lolth, Halisstra is told her destiny is to find an ancient magical blade, the Crescent Blade. The blade is said to be able to cut through anything, and she soon realizes she is to use it to kill Lolth. The blade, however, has been lost in the Cold Fields, and Halisstra travels to find it, Ryld following without permission. The guardian of the blade is a worm, and after both are killed, Halisstra and Ryld defeat the worm and flee to the forest with the Crescent Blade, where they are healed by the Eilistraeens.

The remaining five members of the group (Quenthel, Jeggred, Danifae, Pharaun, and Valas) search for another route to the Abyss in order to find Lolth. Pharaun summons the demon Belshazu, who is Jeggred's father, in order to find the location of a Ship of Chaos, which can traverse the planes to Lolth's Domain. They are told to travel to the underwater city of Zanhoriloch in Lake Thoroot where they are to speak to Queen Oothoon, who apparently knows the location of the ship. After some tricks, primarily manufactured by Pharaun, the group make their way through a dimensional portal to the Lake of Shadows, home of the Ship of Chaos. They board the ship and imprison its demon captain, though the ship requires souls to be fed to it in order to shift to the Abyss.

In Menzoberranzan, Gromph Baenre escapes his prison with the help of his rat familiar Kyorli and a mindflayer whom Gromph promises great power, and then subsequently kills. He immediately helps bolster the defense of the city against the duergar and tanuruuk armies that have reached and begun to lay siege to Menzoberranzan. Gromph and his most trusted associates at Sorcere attempt to kill Nimor Imphraezl, but their spells are either turned against them or Nimor uses one of his rings to retreat to the plane of shadow before he can be killed. Taking advantage of this, Gromph tricks Nimor into holding a triangle of light, and when he retreats to the shadow plane, he is trapped there, for a patch of shadow is required in order to return to the material plane. The magic from the triangle blinds Gromph however, and he is forced to view the world through the eyes of his rat familiar.

=== Annihilation ===
Beginning on the Ship of Chaos, Aliisza the Alu-fiend secretly helps Pharaun to connect mentally to the ship. In need of supplies, Valas and Danifae travel to the Drow city of Sschindylryn on Danifae's request, knowing former house mage Zinnirit Yauntyrr resides there. Zinnirit dispels the magic bonding to Halisstra, making Danifae a free Drow. She subsequently kills Zinnirit and steals his ring of teleportation. Rashuub, Demonic captain of the Ship of Chaos, makes several attempts to kill Quenthel, Jeggred and Pharaun, including gating in other Uridezu's to attack the Drow. Quenthel is seriously injured in the attack and becomes ill, during which time she appears to lose some faith in Lolth and becomes increasingly dependent on the conscious vipers of her whip. Jeggred's allegiance to Quenthel begins to falter as she becomes increasingly despondent, and he slowly comes under the influence of Danifae. Using her new ring, Danifae takes Jeggred to the surface with her to kill Ryld and Halisstra, and after a long battle Jeggred murders Ryld. Halisstra on the other hand returns to her sisterhood, heartbroken at the loss of her love, and believing it was Quenthel who ordered the death of Ryld based on a story Danifae manufactured. When Jeggred and Danifae return to the ship, Pharaun guides the group on the ship to the Abyss, with the help of Aliisza being the main factor in their success. When they reach Lolth's domain, they find it destroyed, Lolth gone. Suddenly the priestess' spells are restored to them, meaning Lolth is alive and has again begun to speak. They realize she has removed herself from the Abyss, and they go in search of her, guided by her call for her Yor'thae, Lolth's Chosen. Valas leaves the group at this point, his contract to guide Quenthel fulfilled.

After Halisstra returns to her sisterhood, she and two others are sent to journey into the Abyss and kill Lolth. Halisstra is still confused by her religious beliefs however, and the turmoil often boils over for her. She too can hear the call for the Yor'thae, and follows it throughout the Abyss. Meanwhile, in Menzoberranzan, Gromph has his eyes magically and surgically replaced by those of a traitor from House Agrach Dyrr. Gromph engages in a battle with the Lichdrow Dyrr in order to turn the tide against the armies attacking the city. After a long, grievous battle, Dyrr nearly attains victory with the help of Nimor before Lolth restores the priestess' powers, and Triel turns the tide in Gromph's favor. Gromph allows his staff to release all of its power, destroying the staff but also destroying the physical manifestation of Dyrr. With Lolth again affording spells to her followers, the Drow gain the upper hand in the battle, and the Scoured Legion of Kaanyr Vhok retreat, leaving the Duergar for dead. Gromph, aware he must destroy the Phylactery of Dyrr or the Lichdrow will regenerate, begins to draw up a plan with his fellow Masters of Sorcery, which is carried out in Resurrection.

=== Resurrection ===
The book begins with the yugoloth Inthracis, a denizen of the Abyss. The Masked Lord Vhaeraun visits Inthracis, and orders him to kill the Yor'thae, promising him the highest position of power among his order. Halisstra and her fellow priestess' of Eilistraee continue their journey to kill Lolth, but soon decide they must kill the Yor'thae in order to kill Lolth, and Halisstra believes that person to be Quenthel Baenre. Quenthel meanwhile, her strength and faith fully restored, continues to move towards Lolth, fully in the belief that she is the Yor'thae. Jeggred is now fully devoted to Danifae, and Pharaun's allegiance leans towards Quenthel, though no trust is held between them. The two groups meet at the Pass of the Soulreaver, a portal separating Lolth's home from the rest of the Demonweb Pits. Halisstra's fellow priestesses, Feliane and Uluyara, are killed and Halisstra is fatally wounded by Danifae. Cursing the betrayal, and lack of intervention by Eilistrae, she renounces her faith yet again, returning to the darkness of Lolth. She manages a healing spell, saving herself from death, and she follows Danifae, Quenthel, Jeggred and Pharaun into the Pass of the Soul Reaver. In order to pass over to Lolth's realm, the females who enter the pass undergo tests of faith, including viewing themselves in the future having been rejected as the Yor'thae.

Once past the Pass of the Soul Reaver, the group come upon the Planes of Soulfire, and the army led by Inthracis. Quenthel summons a great demon to assist their fight, while Danifae calls upon Lolth to send millions of spiders to their aid. Pharaun meanwhile takes on Inthracis himself, and eventually defeats the yugoloth. With the battle raging, Halisstra joins the others on the Planes of Soulfire, and after sacrificing Pharaun to the spider horde, the three priestess' make their way to Lolth's tabernacle. Once inside, Danifae is the first to be destroyed, consumed by one of the eight manifestations of Lolth. Suddenly seven of the manifestations attack the eighth, and from the carnage steps Danifae Yauntyrr, the Yor'thae. Quenthel is ordered to go back to Menzoberranzan and be restored as the Mistress of Arach-Tinilith. Halisstra, however, is punished for her unforgivable acts of disloyalty and sacrilege, and is ordered to serve as Lolth's Lady Penitent. Upon her exit from the tabernacle, Quenthel sacrifices Jeggred to the new incarnation of Lolth, allowing spiders to feed on his flesh.

In Menzoberranzan, the invasion has been squashed, and House Xorlainn lays siege to the traitor house Agrach Dyrr on orders from Matron Mother Triel Baenre. The phylactery of the Lichdrow Dyrr is hidden away within the house, and Gromph Baenre undergoes a mission to breach the wards placed around the house and destroy it. Using scrying techniques, he discovers the phylactery is hidden within the house's temple, and disguises himself to gain entry. Once inside, he engages in a battle with an obsidian golem, the protector of the phylactery. When he overcomes the golem, he finds the phylactery in its center. Once he passes the wards on the stone, he cleaves it with an enchanted axe, destroying Dyrr forever. Upon the destruction of the phylactery, the temple is magically destroyed, but Gromph teleports out in time. Thus ends the War of the Spider Queen.

== Characters ==
The main characters throughout the War of the Spider Queen saga include, in alphabetical order:

Aliisza

Aliisza is an Alu-fiend: a half breed between a Succubus and a human. She is the concubine of Kaanyr Vhok, however she is insatiable in pleasures of the flesh and often seeks others such as Pharaun Mizzrym to satisfy her needs. She meets Pharuan during the group's passage to Ched Nasad in Insurrection and later beds him in the novel. She is always flirty with Pharaun and often attempts to coerce information from him, as she is ever acting as a spy for Vhok. Aliisza helps Pharaun guide the Ship of Chaos into the Abyss in Annihilation, though Pharaun alone knows about her intervention. After Pharaun is killed, Aliisza finds the remains of his body and retrieves his finger, making many fans hope Pharaun will be resurrected in the future.

Danifae Yauntyrr

Danifae is a battle captive in the service of Halisstra Melarn, meaning she is magically bound to the fate of Halisstra. She is a devout worshiper of Lolth, never faltering in her faith at any time. After the destruction of Ched Nasad, she is forced to join Quenthel's expedition along with Halisstra. When Halisstra leaves the expedition, Danifae finds a way to break her bondage, and becomes free. When Quenthel is shaken in her faith, Danifae takes full advantage and gathers the allegiance of Jeggred, who is devout to Lolth above all else. Thanks to her unwavering faith, Danifae is eventually named as the Yor'thae, Lolth's chosen, and is made part of the Spider Queen's new form.

Dyrr (Lichdrow Dyrr)

Dyrr is the de facto ruler of House Agrach Dyrr and true power behind the throne of Yasraena Dyrr. The Lichdrow is over 2,000 years old and is an extremely powerful spellcaster. He incites the initial attack on Menzoberranzan by gathering a group of males wishing to gain power in the city, along with many slaves. After the initial attack failed, Dyrr along with Nimor Imphraezl were heavily involved in the attack upon the city by Kaanyr Vhok and Horgar Steelshadow. It was Dyrr's own house which turned on the Drow army, causing them defeat at the Pillars of Woe. Dyrr was then involved in a long battle with Gromph Baenre, where his corporeal form was eventually destroyed. Dyrr had hidden his phylactery deep inside House Agrach Dyrr's temple, lodged inside an obsidian spider-golem. Gromph eventually managed to destroy the golem and bypass Dyrr's wards, destroying the Lichdrow forever.

Gromph Baenre

Gromph is the Archmage of Menzoberranzan and a Master of Sorcere. When Lolth goes silent, Gromph is the most powerful caster in the city, and the Lichdrow Dyrr attempts to gain his allegiance. When Gromph refuses, Dyrr imprisons him inside Sorcere, though everyone believes him to be dead. He eventually breaks out of his bondage and engages in a long battle with the Lichdrow, which he wins with help from his sister Triel when her powers are restored. Gromph is then sent on a mission to destroy the Lichdrow's Phylactery before he can be reborn. Though he nearly dies several times, Gromph eventually succeeds, destroying much of House Agrach Dyrr in the process.

Halisstra Melarn

First Daughter of House Melarn, Halisstra is made house-less in the destruction of Ched Nasad, and joins Quenthel's group. Her faith is shaken by the loss of her house, and she eventually breaks during the group's first expedition to the Demonweb Pits. After being captured on a trek over the surface by Dark Elves who follow Eilistraee, Halisstra contemplates the idea of serving another deity, one that does not abandon their followers. She decides to abandon the group at the end of Condemnation and Ryld Argith, who is attracted to her, follows along. Halisstra joins the Eilistraeean's where she finds that her destiny is to kill Lolth, and she falls in love with Ryld. After Ryld is killed, Halisstra and two other Eilistraeean's follow Quenthel into the Abyss. When Danifae betrays her, Halisstra denounces Eilistraee for not warning her, and embraces Lolth once again. Lolth punishes her for being unfaithful, and makes Halisstra her "Lady Penitent", a servant to Lolth for all eternity.

Jeggred Baenre

Son of Triel and the demon Belshazu, Jeggred is a Draegloth, half Drow half Demon. Though physically massive and full of feral strength, Jeggred is lacking in intelligence. His dedication to his Mistress and Lolth however is uncanny, and is often the only thing that abates his blood lust. Jeggred is sent along on Quenthel's journey in order to protect her and ensure Triel's interests on their journey. In Annihilation he joins with Danifae Yauntyrr, seeing his aunt now as weak. Jeggred kills Ryld Argith in Annihilation on orders from Danifae Yauntyrr before he himself is sacrificed to Lolth by Quenthel Baenre.

Kaanyr Vhok

Kaanyr Vhok is a Cambion, his parents being a demon and a mortal. He is the leader of the Scoured Legion, an army of Tanarukks and half-fiends stationed at Hellgate Keep. He enters into an agreement with Nimor Imphraezl to fight along with Horgar Steelshadow and sends his legion against Menzoberranzan. When Lolth returns however, Kaanyr orders his legion to retreat, leaving the Duergar armies of Horgar to be slaughtered.

Nimor Imphraezl

At first thought to be a Drow, Nimor is in truth only half Drow, the other half being that of a Wyrmshadow Dragon. He is the Anointed Blade of the Jaezred Chaulssin, descendants of the ancient city of Chaulssin, a city now trapped in the Shadow Plane. As the Anointed Blade, it is Nimor's job to carry out the orders of Revered Grandfather Mauzzkyl, as well as to create and carry plans of his own to bring suffering to enemies of the Jaezred Chaulssin. Nimor designs an intricate plan to destroy Menzoberranzan using the armies of Kaanyr Vhok and Horgar Steelshadow, but the campaign eventually fails when Lolth restores spells to her priestesses. In Resurrection he is sent back to witness his victory and his failure. He is also stripped of his anointed blade title.

Pharaun Mizzrym

Pharaun is a Master of Sorcere and the only noble son of House Mizzrym. Pharaun was cast out of Sorcere due to sacrificing seven pupils to gain an untold amount of power. Pharaun tries to keep the limits of his abilities close to the vest, only casting what is required. This causes others to underestimate him constantly, which he takes full advantage of. Pharaun is sent with Quenthel on her journey after he and Ryld helped stop the incursion of renegade Drow males and slaves from destroying Menzoberranzan. He is as close as friends can be considered to Drow with Ryld Argith, but he turns on him in the first book causing a rift between the two. His quick wit and sharp tongue often annoy Quenthel and Jeggred to the point of the Draegloth attempting to kill him several times but never succeeding. It is Pharaun who brings the group back to the Abyss the second time, his magical abilities allowing him to maneuver a Ship of Chaos through the planes. He is killed at the end of Resurrection as Quenthel decides she no longer has use for him, and leaves the wizards to be killed by millions of spiders.

Quenthel Baenre

Quenthel is the third daughter of Yvonnel Baenre, sister to Matron Mother Triel Baenre and Mistress of Arach-Tinilith, Menzoberranzan's school for educating priestess' of Lolth. Killed by Drizzt Do'Urden near the end of the attempted Drow invasion of Mithral Hall in The Two Swords, Quenthel was resurrected by Lolth and sent back to Menzoberranzan. Quenthel is sent by Triel to investigate the silence of Lolth. During their quest, Quenthel believes she is the Yor'thae (Lolth's Chosen), but her weakness of faith throughout her journey causes Lolth to reject the priestess, and send her back to Menzoberranzan where she continued to serve as the Mistress of Arach-Tinilith.

Ryld Argith

Ryld is a Master of Melee-Magthere, the Drow school of combat. He is well associated with Phaurun Mizzrym, though their relationship could never be described as friendship. Ryld is a well trained fighter and carries an enchanted blade named "Splitter". Having been heavily involved in stopping an initial invasion attempt of Menzoberranzan, Ryld is sent by Triel Baenre along with Quenthel to discover the reason behind Lolth's silence. On the journey, Ryld meets and eventually falls in love with Halisstra Melarn. The pair go to the surface world. He is hunted down and killed by Jeggred in Annihilation on orders from Danifae Yauntyrr.

Triel Baenre

First daughter of Yvonnel Baenre, Triel is named Matron Mother of Menzoberranzan upon the death of her mother. She is short of stature, bad tempered, and a calculating ruler. Triel has one son, Jeggred, who is a Draegloth (see Jeggred Baenre). Throughout the series, Triel is forced to defend the city from the attempted invasions of slave hordes and the combined efforts of Nimor Imphraezl, Kaanyr Vhok, and Horgar Steelshadow. She then orders the destruction of the traitor House Agrach Dyrr, who eventually become a vassal house to House Baenre.

Valas Hune

Valas is a mercenary working under Bregan D'aerthe, a group started by Jarlaxle Baenre. He has traveled much of the Underdark and is sent on the journey with Quenthel as a guide. He carries with him several magical items, including one which allows him to teleport behind enemies, where he uses his twin Kukuris' to kill. As a mercenary, Valas has contacts throughout the Underdark and the world above, and it is his idea to contact the Priests of Vhaereun to look for answers about Lolth's silence. Valas abandons the group in Annihilation before they enter Lolth's domain for the second time claiming he no longer has a use to the group.

== Reception ==
Extinction made The New York Times Best Seller list in 2004. Annihilation ranked #22 on The New York Times Best Seller list in August 2004 and Resurrection ranked #27 on the list in May 2005. The National Post, on their "Canada's Top New Books" list, ranked Annihilation at #2 in August 2005 and Resurrection at #2 in February 2006. War of the Spider Queen appeared on the 2024 Game Rant "31 Best Dungeons & Dragons Novels, Ranked" list at #21 – Rhenn Taguiam wrote that the series "showed how remarkably complex the interpoliticking of Lolth's worshippers could be" with its focus "on the inner politics within Drow society", which is unlike other "Dungeons & Dragons stories that often feature adventurers fighting evil". Taguiam commented that it is "interesting to see complex plots interweave and resolve themselves" over the course of the series. War of the Spider Queen also appeared on the 2025 Screen Rant "10 Best Forgotten Realms Book Series, Ranked" list at #6 – Cristina Trujillo commented that the "series is a very well-produced exploration of Lolth, the Spider Queen, and her impact on various characters and places. Salvatore runs a tight ship, and this series could be abstractly considered a sister series to his Legend of Drizzt books, if not a direct part of them".

Fred Phillips, for The News-Star in 2002, commented that "R.A. Salvatore's stamp is all over" the War of the Spider Queen series even "though he didn't do any of the actual writing". In his review of Dissolution, Phillips noted that Richard Lee Byers "echoes Salvatore's" work in terms of "handling" the drow and combat scenes while putting "his own stamp on the project" – "while Salvatore prefers to focus on character interactions, Byars' style is driven by plot". He commented that Dissolution does not have "many introspective moments" and Byars' "characters may lack in depth", however, "Byars more than makes up for in sheer action" as the "pace is fast and furious, with the characters being thrown from one dangerous situation to another". Phillips, in his review of Insurrection for The News-Star in 2003, highlighted a benefit of the series having multiple authors "is that readers can get the series in their hands much more quickly", however, a "disadvantage is that there could be continuity problems" so going in, he was concerned how well the series "would flow from one book to the next". Phillips commented that he felt the first transition went "smoothly" and while there are style differences between Byers and Thomas M. Reid, "the two writers seem to have a singular vision of the characters and events, and most readers will hardly notice the difference". He opined that Insurrection does well as a "building block" for the larger series story and has an "entertaining" story, however, it is not a starting point "for readers unfamiliar with the Forgotten Realms world and drow society" as the book "plops the reader down right in the middle of the action and some understanding of how things operate and what has happened before is needed". His main criticism was that Insurrection "doesn't divorce itself enough from the game – especially in regards to magic", so the adherence to game rules is sometimes "jarring".

In 2003, Don D'Ammassa of Chronicle wrote that Condemnation "is pure sword and sorcery, not the kind of high court intrigue that dominates most other fantasy publishers. The emphasis is on action and adventure, with some conspiracies, rivalries, and other complications to embellish the plot". Per Harriet Klausner's review for Resurrection: "The sixth and final fantasy in the delightful War of the Spider Queen series is a strong conclusion that will please fans of dark tales with the Queen and the drow taking center stage. Especially enjoying the tale will be the myriad of readers who devour the works of R. A. Salvatore, as this and the predecessors (see Byers' Dissolution, Reid's Insurrection, Baker's Condemnation, Smedman's Extinction, and Athans' Annihilation) pay homage to the great fantasist. Though better to read the previous novels first but in spite of connectivity gaps, Paul S. Kemp provides a strong finishing touch."
