= Into the Unknown: The Dungeon Survival Handbook =

2012 role-playing game supplement

Into the Unknown
- Cover of the first edition
- Authors: Logan Bonner, Matt Sernett, and Jeff Morgenroth
- Language: English
- Subject: Role-playing games
- Genre: Dungeons & Dragons
- Publisher: Wizards of the Coast
- Publication date: 2012
- Publication place: United States
- Media type: Print (Trade hardcover)

Into the Unknown: The Dungeon Survival Handbook is a supplement for the 4th edition of the Dungeons & Dragons fantasy role-playing game.

== Contents ==
Into the Unknown contains an assortment of new powers, equipment, feats, character themes, and three player races; the svirfneblin, the kobold and the goblin. For Dungeon Masters, the book contains dungeon-building advice and details, including lore on classic dungeon monsters, companions for adventurers, a few treasures, and tips for incorporating players' character themes into an adventure.

There are three chapters and two appendices in this book:

- Chapter 1: Dungeon Delvers
  - "Chapter One makes up almost half of the 160-page volume" and it "highlights seven new Character Themes, three new playable character races and then wraps up with nearly twenty pages of new powers for various classes, skills and themes".
- Chapter 2: Strive to Survive
  - "Chapter Two is all about helping the DM craft a memorable dungeon-based experience. PCs can get use out of some sections, but really it’s all about setting the mood and setting up a dungeon for play".
- Chapter 3: Master of the Dungeon
  - "Chapter Three has four sections: Involving the Characters, Creating an Underdark Adventure, Dungeon Makers and Special Rewards".
- Appendix 1: Build Your Own Dungeon
  - "This is just four pages on tips and tricks to help you figure out what you want out of a homebrew dungeon".
- Appendix 2: Random Dungeons
  - "The last five pages of the book are devoted to a random dungeon generator".

== Publication history ==
Into the Unknown was written by Logan Bonner, Matt Sernett, and Jeff Morgenroth and featured painted artwork by Noah Bradley. It was published on May 15, 2012 by Wizards of the Coast as a 160-page hardcover book. It is now available online as a PDF.

Shannon Appelcline commented that the ninth season of Encounters, Web of the Spider Queen (2012, 13 weeks), was "the start of a trilogy of Seasons that would close out the 4E Encounters and confront players with the entire drow race. Tied into Into the Unknown: The Dungeon Survival Guide (2012), a general look at the Underdark." Appelcline also wrote that ''D&D 4e (2008-2012) production became wobbly in the year following the Essentials (2010) experiment, then on January 9, 2012, Wizards announced that the edition was coming to an end. A few mass-market 4e books trickled out in early 2012, but Into the Unknown was the last of them, leaving D&D 4e with a lifetime of less than four years. [...] A few 4e-statted books later appeared in giveaways and as part of the Encounters programs, but following Into the Unknown, Wizards' mass-market production turned to edition-neutral books — repeating the pattern of the 3e transition, where Wizards became reluctant to publish edition-specific books about a year out. [...] Though it had been foreshadowed in April with a convention adventure, Into the Unknown was the major release that kicked off "Rise of the Underdark", Wizards of the Coast's biggest multimedia metaplot ever, running from May 2012 through the end of 2012. The crossover focused on Lolth driving the drow to attack the surface world, but Wizards went further than that by using it as an excuse to generally spotlight drow and the Underdark in all of their media. [...] In all, it was a rather impressive product release of over 20(!) linked books and events!"

== Reception ==
John ONeill from Black Gate stated that "Into the Unknown makes me want to pick up my dice again. In terms of sheer inspirational value, it surpasses any title since Frostburn (2004) and Sandstorm (2005). Even if you never play D&D again, Into the Unknown is still a great value, especially for collectors and old school gamers who appreciate the fine art of dungeon design."

Shannon Appelcline commented that after the debut of the Underdark in the Dungeoneer's Survival Guide (1986) "it was a long time before D&D returned to this fertile ground. Dungoenscape (2007) covered some of the same material, but with most of its focus on dungeons. Then Dungeon Survival Guide (2007) reused the original name, but was mainly a nostalgic look at classic dungeons. Into the Unknown: The Dungeon Survival Handbook (2012) consigned the classic name to a subhead but was still the book most in tune with the original: it includes player mechanics, GM advice, the Underdark … and even a look at a few classic dungeons."

Wired commented that "if you turn to supplements like this for more than the numbers – for things like quest ideas, character motivations and new settings – then Into the Unknown deserves a spot on your D&D shelf."

DieHard GameFan said that "If you’re a 4e fan, you’ll definitely want to consider picking up this book for the sheer wealth of ideas it contains. Even if you’re not using Fourth Edition, flip through Into the Unknown: The Dungeon Survival Handbook; you might just like what you see."
