= Neverwinter Campaign Setting =

Tabletop role-playing game supplement

- Rules required: Dungeons & Dragons
- Character levels: N/A
- Campaign setting: Forgotten Realms
- Authors: Matt Sernett, Erik Scott de Bie, Ari Marmell
- First published: August 16, 2011
- ISBN: 978-0-7869-5814-6

Neverwinter Campaign Setting is a supplement to the 4th edition of the Dungeons & Dragons role-playing game.

== Contents ==
The book contains an introduction and four chapters:

- Introduction
- Chapter 1: Jewel of the North
  - "The first chapter, Jewel of the North is only about ten pages and it tries to cover the entire history of the Neverwinter region in that span".
- Chapter 2: Character Options
  - "Chapter Two, Character Options is far meatier and it runs nearly seventy pages. The chapter can be divided into four sections: Character Themes, Racial Backgrounds, Warpriest Domains, and finally, a brand new character class known as the Bladesinger".
- Chapter 3: Factions and Foes
  - "Chapter 3, Factions and Foes is about fifty pages long and the title kind of says it all here. This is where you'll find a lot of plot hooks around countries or organizations that will make up the majority of your antagonists in a Neverwinter setting".
- Chapter 4: Gazetteer
  - "The final chapter of the book, Gazetteer takes up half the pages contained therein [...]. However the section doesn't spend much, if any, time talking about the past – everything is in the present".

== Publication history ==
The Neverwinter Mass Adventure was released to attendees of GenCon 2011 as a preview of the book and a push towards Neverwinter themed products. On August 6, 2011, shortly after GenCon, local game stores could participate in Neverwinter Game Day with the adventure Gates of Neverdeath before the 223-page hardcover book was released on August 16, 2011.

Shannon Appelcline commented that with the sixth season of Encounters, Lost Crown of Neverwinter (2011, 14 weeks), "Wizards used Season 6 to highlight their newest (and last) campaign book for 4E: the Neverwinter Campaign Setting (2011). They made a big deal of it, kicking it off with the Gates of Neverdeath adventure at D&D Games Day (August 2011), and then continuing into the 14-week series of Forgotten Realms Encounters." Appelcline noted that even while Dungeons & Dragons 4E was showing increasing signs of weakness at the time, "they changed up their campaign-a-year format with the release of the Neverwinter Campaign Setting (2011), which returned to the Forgotten Realms rather than breaking new ground."

== Related products ==
Appelcline wrote about the Neverwinter Campaign Setting being launched as 4th edition's first major multimedia release, noting that the city setting spawned four novels by R.A. Salvatore called the Neverwinter Saga, a comic book, and a board game called The Legend of Drizzt (2011), as well as two video games - the Facebook game Heroes of Neverwinter and a MMORPG called simply "Neverwinter."

Laura Tommervik (Wizards of the Coast marketing team) explained the approach: "We use Neverwinter as the connective tissue across multiple product categories. The transmedia campaign is an opportunity for fans to experience the brand however they choose to".

=== List of products ===
Title	Creator(s)	Type	Date	ISBN
Gauntlgrym	R.A. Salvatore	Novel	October 5, 2010	9780786955008
Gates of Neverdeath	Erik Scott de Bie	Adventure module	August 6, 2011	
Lost Crown of Neverwinter	Erik Scott de Bie	Adventure module	Summer 2011	
Heroes of Neverwinter	Liquid Entertainment	Facebook game	2011	n/a
The Legend of Drizzt	Peter Lee, Jason Engle, Steve Prescott	Board game	2011	n/a
Neverwinter	R.A. Salvatore	Novel	October 4, 2011	9780786958429
Brimstone Angels	Erin M. Evans	Novel	November 11, 2011	978-0786958467
The Legend of Drizzt: Neverwinter Tales (Dungeons & Dragons: Drizzt #1-5)	R.A. Salvatore, Gene Salvatore, Agustin Padilla	Trade paperback	March 2012	9781613771563
Charon's Claw	R.A. Salvatore	Novel	August 7, 2012	9780786962235
The Last Threshold	R.A. Salvatore	Novel	March 5, 2013	9780786963645
Neverwinter	Cryptic Studios	Video game	June 20, 2013	n/a

== Reception ==
The book was nominated for "Best Roleplaying Supplement" in the 2011 Origins Awards. It was also nominated for the 2011 Golden Geek "Best RPG Supplement" and the 2012 ENnies "Best Art, Cover".

Alex Lucard, for Diehard GameFAN, wrote "Neverwinter consists of four chapters and an introduction. [...] There's not a lot of detail there and longtime D&D players might be a bit miffed at the lack of history in this opening. It's very truncated, but if you've been playing in the Forgotten Realms setting prior to this, you probably know most of the history by heart. [...] Still, it would have been nice to have a more in-depth piece on what happened from the start of the Spellplague on other than a few novel series. [...] The book gives you thirteen [character themes]. [...] I have mixed feeling on the themes ranging from 'Holy hell, that's awesome' for the lycanthropes and 'Wow, that is pretty underwhelming” for the Red Wizard'. [...] Choosing one of these themes (which the book all but insists that you do) gives you a new starting feature to lay on top of everything else your character would have, along with some additional features and optional powers you can pick up as you level up. [...] My only complaint is that several themes are unbalanced and it would have been nice to have more than thirteen. Perhaps twenty or so, Because of the imbalance, you'll quickly see certain ones become prevalent over others. [...] The final chapter of the book, Gazetteer takes up half the pages contained therein and it pretty much answers all the complaints people had about earlier 4th Edition Forgotten Realms publications. [...] The last thing to talk about is the art. It's pretty hit or miss. [...] Overall, while the Neverwinter Campaign Setting has a few minor issues, the overall book is a wonderful one from beginning to end. It's honestly the best product I've seen Wizards of the Coast put out for 4th Edition so far and I honestly think if this version of Dungeons & Dragons had started out with products this strong, the backlash against leaving the d20 system wouldn't have been so severe".
