= Neverwinter =

Fictional city in Dungeons & Dragons

- Forgotten Realms location

In-universe information
- Ruled by: Lord Dagult Neverember
- Population: 23,200

Neverwinter is a fictional city-state in the Forgotten Realms campaign setting for the Dungeons & Dragons fantasy role-playing game. Neverwinter was founded by Lord Halueth Never. It sits on the northwestern coast of the subcontinent of Faerûn.

The city has been the home locale for the first graphical MMORPG ever created, the original Neverwinter Nights on AOL (1991–1997), which was developed by Stormfront Studios. BioWare later acquired the rights to the title and developed a series of best-selling role-playing video games under the name Neverwinter Nights.

In the Dungeons & Dragons 4th Edition version of the Forgotten Realms lore, Neverwinter was destroyed in the Spellplague and much of its population scattered. This was accompanied by a new trilogy of Drizzt novels taking place in the city as it is being rebuilt, written by R. A. Salvatore. Other products included the MMORPG Neverwinter.

== Creative origins ==
Neverwinter was created by Ed Greenwood as part of his fledgling Forgotten Realms campaign setting.

Shannon Appelcline, the author of Designers & Dragons series, notes that while TSR was interested in publishing a new setting in 1986 "the story of the Realms actually began some two decades earlier. A young Ed Greenwood was a voracious reader, influenced by Poul Anderson (1926-2001), Edgar Rice Burroughs (1875-1950), Alexandre Dumas (1802-1870), Fritz Leiber (1910-1992), A. Merritt (1884-1943), William Shakespeare (1564-1616), and others. Some time between 1966 and 1969 (sources vary), Greenwood tried his hand at writing too, penning the first story of the Realms. [...] It was the first of many stories of Mirt the Moneylender. [...] In the years that followed, Mirt traveled up and down the Sword Coast in Greenwood's stories, and so the author discovered Mirabar, Luskan, Neverwinter, Port Llast, Waterdeep, and Baldur's Gate. Within a year he [had] drawn a map showing these places, truly turning the stories into a world. And thus the Realms was born".

== Publication history ==
=== Advanced Dungeons & Dragons 1st Edition ===
Neverwinter is a friendly city of craftsmen, who trade extensively via the great merchants of Waterdeep; their water-clocks and multi-hued lamps can be found throughout the Realms. Neverwinter gained its name from the skill of its gardeners, who contrived to keep flowers blooming throughout the months of snow - a practice they continue with pride. — Elminster's Notes

Neverwinter received an initial description in the Forgotten Realms Campaign Set (1987). Jennell Jaquays expanded on Neverwinter in The Savage Frontier (1988).

=== Advanced Dungeons & Dragons 2nd Edition ===
For AD&D 2nd Edition, the city was revisited in the boxed set the Forgotten Realms Campaign Setting (1993) and the Forgotten Realms Campaign Setting Revised (1996). The Player's Guide to the Forgotten Realms Campaign (1993) also visited Neverwinter. This supplement was written in the form of a journal detailing the travels of an eclectic adventuring party.

All in all, Neverwinter is perhaps the most cosmopolitan city in Faerûn, escaping Waterdeep's slums and grasping competitiveness, and Silverymoon's harsher climate and heavier need for defense against orcs and other evils. Cities in Amn and Calimshan commonly claim to be more civilized, but merchants who trade there all say that Neverwinter truly is civilized, unlike some showier rivals who, as the sage Mellomir once put it, "have achieved decadence without the need for passing through civilization first". — Volo

Volo's Guide to the North (1993) contained extensive details about the city including landmarks, taverns and inns. It also went into detail about the surrounding area including the Neverwinter River, the Neverwinter Wood and the villages of Conyberry and Phandalin. Volo's Guide to the North was one in a series of guidebooks written by Ed Greenwood through the character Volothamp Geddarm's perspective with another character's (Elminster of Shadowdale) commentary throughout.

In the boxed set The North: Guide to the Savage Frontier (1996), characters and items from Neverwinter were included along with details about the area surrounding the city, such as the Neverwinter Wood.

=== 3rd Edition & 3.5 ===
Neverwinter made a brief appearance in the Forgotten Realms Campaign Setting (2001). Appelcline commented that "the Sword Coast has long been one of the most detailed parts of the Forgotten Realms. Neverwinter lies in its north, just past the Mere of Dead Men. From the earliest days of the Realms, it was often mentioned as one of the most civilized cities in Faerûn. Though it made notable appearances in Volo's Guide to the North (1993) and The North: Guide to the Savage Frontier (1996), prior to the publication of the Neverwinter Campaign Setting (2011), the best detail on the city had always been found in computer games".

In 2002, Neverwinter became the main setting for Neverwinter Nights, a video game developed by BioWare. Between 2002 and 2006, seven expansion/premium packs were released for the game. The game's success led to a sequel, Neverwinter Nights 2 developed by Obsidian Entertainment, which was released on October 31, 2006.

=== 4th Edition ===
Appelcline commented that with the sixth season of Encounters, Lost Crown of Neverwinter (2011, 14 weeks), "Wizards used Season 6 to highlight their newest (and last) campaign book for 4E: the Neverwinter Campaign Setting (2011). They made a big deal of it, kicking it off with the Gates of Neverdeath adventure at D&D Games Day (August 2011), and then continuing into the 14-week series of Forgotten Realms Encounters". Alex Lucard, for Diehard GameFAN, wrote that the Neverwinter Campaign Setting has "more detail about the area of Neverwinter [...] than previous 4th Edition campaign settings have given to entire WORLDS". Lucard also highlighted that half of the book is a gazetteer with information on the present world state of Neverwinter: "For those of you looking to bridge between third and fourth edition's Neverwinter, there won't be much here for you. For everyone else, CONTENT CONTENT CONTENT. You want legends about why Neverwinter stays warm even in a region where it should be freezing? You get TWO (not just the fire elementals heating the water one). Do you want to learn about all sorts of important locations and buildings within the city of Neverwinter? It's here? Interested in the stats around the Lost Crown of Neverwinter, which the D&D Encounters are currently revolving around? They're in here! Want your characters to learn secret special moves from Drizzt Do'Urden himself? You can!"

Appelcline also wrote that the "Neverwinter Campaign Setting was launched as 4e's first major multimedia release — a marketing approach that Wizards would regularly use in later years. It was closely tied to a series of four novels, a comic book, two different computer games, and even a board game, The Legend of Drizzt (2011). [...] Two more Neverwinter computer games were appearing thanks to Wizards' 'transmedia' campaign. A new MMORPG simply called "Neverwinter" was to be the center of the Neverwinter rollout. Unfortunately it was delayed for two years due to the resolution of a computer gaming lawsuit and the subsequent sale of the developer, Cryptic Studios. Fortunately, players had Heroes of Neverwinter (2011-2012), a Facebook game, to keep them occupied in the meantime. Neverwinter (2013) finally appear only after the rest of the launch [...] Neverwinter also got a lot of fictional attention in the early '10s. The heart of this was a quartet of novels by R.A. Salvatore called the Neverwinter Saga". Michael Harrison, for Wired, described Heroes of Neverwinter (2011-2012) as "a surprisingly deep and, dare I say, playable [sic] Facebook game".

Mike Fahey, for Kotaku, wrote that Drizzt Do'Urden is "so popular with role-playing fans that Wizards of the Coast tapped his creator, R.A. Salvatore, to help lead players to Cryptic Studios' upcoming online PC game Neverwinter in a series of new novels. [...] According to the writer, Wizards of the Coast called him up and asked him if he would be in the area when he wrote his next Drizzt book, and as luck would have it, he would be. After a summit to determine how to logically tie the story together with the marketing push, The Neverwinter Saga was born. [...] His involvement in the Neverwinter game is someone less intense, but nonetheless important. Since his trilogy is essentially shaping a portion of that online world, Salvatore, Wizards of the Coast, and Cryptic Studios are collaborating to help keep characters and events straight".

On the transmedia project, Matt Faul, for Diehard GameFAN, wrote that "Neverwinter was of the most cosmopolitan cities in Faerûn, but was left mostly in ruins after the spell plague. [...] If you're a fan of the Forgotten Realms, particularly the City of Neverwinter, this is an exciting time for you. No matter, if you're a video game player, tabletop game players, or just an avid reader Wizards of the Coast has something waiting for you in the legendary City of Neverwinter". Jason Wilson, for VentureBeat, highlighted that "this transmedia project — not only is Neverwinter part of the Forgotten Realms campaign setting, it's also a book series from author R.A. Salvatore — is also coming out during an interesting time in D&D history. Neverwinter (originally scheduled to debut in 2012) is coming out while the 4th Edition of the tabletop game is winding down and the upcoming edition, dubbed 'D&D Next' for now, is in playtesting".

=== 5th Edition ===
What was the blasted, wounded city of Neverwinter just a decade ago is now an exciting, humming place, where folk seem eager to throw off the hardships from which they have emerged and create a new, brighter future for their city. [...] It is the Lord Protector's hope that, with commerce and income both on the rise, and talented craftfolk returning to ply their trades, that Neverwinter will someday again be worthy of its former epithet: the City of Skilled Hands. — Sword Coast Adventurer's Guide

The Neverwinter (2013) MMORPG made the jump to 5th Edition and in 2014, it received a Tyranny of Dragons storyline update. This coincided with the publication of the Tyranny of Dragons adventure modules, Hoard of the Dragon Queen (2014) and The Rise of Tiamat (2014), with the goal of creating a "shared story experience over different media [...]. The player's actions in the online campaign will be overlaid on those in the game's more traditional tabletop campaign". The Neverwinter MMORPG has continued to receive expansions that tie-into tabletop adventure storylines such as: Storm King's Thunder (2016), Tomb of Annihilation (2017), and Waterdeep: Dragon Heist (2018).

In 2015, Neverwinter was featured in the Sword Coast Adventurer's Guide (2015). It included a few details on the founding of the city, information on Neverwinter being rebuilt post the Spellplague and The Ruining, and an updated city map. Storm King's Thunder (2016) also included a short description of the city and the Neverwinter Woods.

== Fictional description ==
Neverwinter was founded in 87 DR and was originally named Eigersstor. Neverwinter had a population of about 23,200 at last count and was also known as the City of Skilled Hands and Jewel of the North. It also served as the origin of the phrase "by the clocks of Neverwinter", used when one is solemnly swearing, a reference to the precision of its timepieces. The erudite travel writer Volo (among others) credits Neverwinter as the most cosmopolitan and the most civilized city in all of Faerûn. He regards this as quite a reputation, considering the breadth and variety of the continent.

The name of the city has its origin in that even though the town is situated in the cold north of Faerûn, the Neverwinter river that flows through it is heated by fire elementals living under the nearby Mount Hotenow in the Neverwinter Wood. The heat given off from the river creates a permanent warm climate in the immediate area; without the elementals, the river, and subsequently the city's water supply, would freeze over. An alternate loric explanation for the name is given in Neverwinter Nights 2: When the city's founder (Halueth Never) was hunted to the coast by orcs, he chose the city's site to make his last stand. Expecting to die in the imminent battle, he named the site "Never's Winter". When the orcs were defeated with help from some human allies, Never founded the city, keeping the name. Over the years the name was shortened to "Neverwinter".

Around 1329 DR, the city was ruled by Lord Nasher Alagondar, an aging, veteran adventurer and devout worshipper of Tyr. Neverwinter was prosperous, its master-craftsmen making lamps of multi-coloured glass, precision water clocks and exquisite jewelry. Its Tyrran faith promotes justice and fairness, and greed is frowned upon.

In addition to its unnaturally warm climate, Neverwinter was a rather picturesque city. It is home to such sights as its three spectacular, intricately carved bridges: the Dolphin, the Winged Wyvern and the Sleeping Dragon. Under these, the waters of the Neverwinter River cascade over small, gentle waterfalls as they course into the city's bustling harbor. Neverwinter's magnificent gardens (the phrase "the City of Skilled Hands" refers to Neverwinter's accomplished gardeners) ensure the warm winters are colourful and the summers are rich with fresh fruit. The city is replete with beautiful and ingeniously designed buildings, many of which are famous in their own right, such as The House of Knowledge, and Neverwinter's tall and many-windowed temple of Oghma. In addition, the reputations of such unique taverns as The Moonstone Mask and The Fallen Tower reach far beyond the Neverwinter's walls. These elements generally make Neverwinter a distinctive city. It is also famous for its important slave market.

The city is a member in good standing of the Lord's Alliance and Lord Nasher ensured that the city is well defended, both physically and magically, against attacks or infiltration from Luskan, Neverwinter's warlike rival. Maps of the city, which has a maze of meandering streets, are not distributed, as part of an effort to thwart Luskan spies. Some merchants in the city do however sell such maps, often over a black market. After Lord Nasher's death, he was succeeded by his son Bann Alagondar.

In 1467 DR, Lord Dagult Neverember, Open Lord of Waterdeep, saw Neverwinter as a golden opportunity to expand his power base so he created a mercantile empire under his command and the title of "Lord Protector of Neverwinter", held by himself. In 1489 DR, Laeral Silverhand became the Open Lord of Waterdeep and Lord Neverember was exiled from the city. Lord Neverember then refocused on Neverwinter and was eventuality accepted as the city's rightful leader.

=== Districts ===
The city of Neverwinter can be roughly divided into five different districts. The inhabitants of these districts clearly differ in social class and status, wealth, prosperity, population and criminality, resulting in class tension throughout the city.

In Neverwinter Nights 2, the continuity regarding the different districts was changed as much of the city was destroyed by plague and the eruption of Mount Houtenow and has been rebuilt. In the sequel, only three districts are available to the player: Blacklake, which has been rebuilt in the area near Castle Never, the Docks, which remain largely unchanged, and the Merchant Quarter, which may be the remnant of the City Core. If this is not the case, the player simply does not have access to the missing districts.

==== City Core ====
The City Core is the district where most of Neverwinter is governed and controlled. In the City Core is the Castle of Neverwinter where Lord Nasher Alagondar lives and governs the different districts of the city. The Halls of Justice, a temple to Tyr, is also located in this district. In addition is The Moonstone Mask, directed by Ophala Cheldarstone, also said to have a brothel in its back rooms which can be accessed for a price. In the middle of the district stands the Cloaktower, a meeting place for mages and sorcerers. Summarized, the City Core is a busy district, populated mostly by middle-class inhabitants and also a few merchants. The City Core is prosperous, wealthy and well defended from external attackers.

==== Beggar's Nest ====
The Beggar's Nest is a district of destitution where most of the poor inhabitants live and work. To the north is a great graveyard, and there has been several records of undead attacks in this district. Under this graveyard there are unexplored tombs and crypts from deceased men. Packed with narrow streets and slum houses, this district is the most exploited of the five.

==== Blacklake District ====
The Blacklake District is the district of the nobles and upper-class inhabitants. Some of the nobles are obliviously paranoid or snobbish, and there are several records of the Blacklakes cutting themselves off from conflicts in the core or other places (by creating a buffer of a gated, small district, sometimes called "No-mans land"). Almost all homes here are prosperous and wealthy, and the entire district is overall quite rich. Streams and small rivers of decorative water flows through the district. The Neverwinter Zoo is placed in Blacklake, being quite inequitable against the animals inside, raising levels of conflict. Meldanen, an Elf Sorcerer, was rumoured to live in a big fortress-mansion in Blacklake, defended by several guards.

Blacklake is a representation of order in the city, maintained through disciplinary power of many guards. It stands on one side of the conflict between different social classes in Neverwinter.

==== Docks ====
The Docks is the district most prone to criminality. It is ruled mostly by organized criminal leaders and thugs, often leading to black auctions and markets. With the main harbour to the west, many illegal wares are easily smuggled into the district, much because authorities do not have a very strong grip on the contemporal events. The district founds The Golden Apple, an inn, and Twenty in a Quiver, a local warbrand shop.

==== Peninsula ====
The Peninsula is a low-populated area almost completely surrounded by water. This strategic position resulted in the building of a prison, which is relatively safe but has had history of some outbreaks and prisoner revolutions. The prison is divided into three levels; the "normal" prison at upper level, a buffer between the worst prisoners location and the normal level, and 'the Pit', a secure dungeon housing the worst prisoners.

== In other media ==
Neverwinter appeared outside of tabletop Dungeons & Dragons in Neverwinter Nights which was the first multiplayer online role-playing game to display graphics, and ran from 1991 to 1997 on AOL. Neverwinter Nights was a low-risk licensing deal for TSR and the company "viewed these arrangements as transmedia opportunities and relied on these efforts to complement its own core rulebooks, novels, and modules. Ironically, it was the low-risk/high-reward licensed products that increasingly granted D&D its greatest exposure during this period; licensed computer games would soon determine how the game was publicly viewed and visualized".

Neverwinter appears in the 2023 film Dungeons & Dragons: Honor Among Thieves.

== Reception ==
Looking at its presentation as a plague-stricken city in Neverwinter Nights (2002), game studies scholar Harry J. Brown found that Neverwinter feels "real because their infected precincts are configured and governed much like the world we occupy everyday".

== List of related products ==
Title	Creator(s)	Type	Date	ISBN
Forgotten Realms Campaign Set	Karen S. Boomgarden, Ed Greenwood, Jeff Grubb	Sourcebook	1987	0-88038-472-7
The Savage Frontier	Jennell Jaquays	Sourcebook	1988	0-88038-593-6
Neverwinter Nights	Stormfront Studios	Video game	1991	n/a
Forgotten Realms Campaign Setting	Jeff Grubb, Ed Greenwood, Julia Martin	Boxed set	1993, 1996 (revised edition)	978-1-56076-617-9
Player's Guide to the Forgotten Realms Campaign	Anthony Herring	Supplement	1993	1-56076-695-6
Volo's Guide to the North	Ed Greenwood	Sourcebook	1993	1-56076-678-6
The North: Guide to the Savage Frontier	Dale "Slade" Henson, Jim Butler, Ed Greenwood, Jeff Grubb, Julia Martin, Steven Schend, Jennell Jaquays, Steve Perrin	Boxed Set	1996	0-7869-0391-0
Forgotten Realms Campaign Setting	Ed Greenwood, Sean K. Reynolds, Skip Williams and Rob Heinsoo	Sourcebook	2001	0-7869-1836-5
Neverwinter Nights	BioWare	Video game	2002	n/a
Neverwinter Nights 2	Obsidian Entertainment	Video game	2006	n/a
Gauntlgrym	R.A. Salvatore	Novel	October 5, 2010	978-0-7869-5500-8
Gates of Neverdeath	Erik Scott de Bie	Adventure module	August 6, 2011	
Neverwinter Campaign Setting	Matt Sernett, Erik Scott de Bie, Ari Marmell	Sourcebook	August 16, 2011	978-0-7869-5814-6
Lost Crown of Neverwinter	Erik Scott de Bie	Adventure module	Summer 2011	
Neverwinter	R.A. Salvatore	Novel	October 4, 2011	978-0-7869-5842-9
Brimstone Angels	Erin M. Evans	Novel	November 11, 2011	978-0-7869-5846-7
Heroes of Neverwinter	Liquid Entertainment, Atari	Facebook game	2011	n/a
The Legend of Drizzt	Peter Lee, Jason Engle, Steve Prescott	Board game	2011	n/a
The Legend of Drizzt: Neverwinter Tales (Dungeons & Dragons: Drizzt #1-5)	R.A. Salvatore, Gene Salvatore, Agustin Padilla	Trade paperback	March 2012	978-1-61377-156-3
Charon's Claw	R.A. Salvatore	Novel	August 7, 2012	978-0-7869-6223-5
The Last Threshold	R.A. Salvatore	Novel	March 5, 2013	978-0-7869-6364-5
Neverwinter	Cryptic Studios	Video game	June 20, 2013	n/a
Sword Coast Adventurer's Guide	Steve Kenson, Joseph Carriker, Brian Cortijo, Jeremy Crawford, Peter Lee, Jon Leitheusser, Mike Mearls, Jack Norris, Sean K. Reynolds, Matthew Sernett, Rodney Thompson	Sourcebook	November 3, 2015	978-0-7869-6580-9
Storm King's Thunder	Wizards RPG Team	Adventure module	September 6, 2016	978-0-7869-6600-4
Vecna: Even of Ruin	Amanda Hamon, Makenzie De Armas, Ron Lundeen, Patrick Renie	Adventure module	May 21, 2024	978-0-7869-6947-0
