= Neverwinter (disambiguation) =

Neverwinter may refer to:

- Neverwinter, a fictional city in the Forgotten Realms
- Neverwinter (novel), a novel taking place in the city
- Neverwinter (video game), a video game taking place in the city
