= Neverwinter (video game) =

2013 video game

- Developer: Cryptic Studios
- Publisher: Arc Games (Note: Previously published under the names Perfect World Entertainment and Gearbox Publishing San Francisco)
- Producers: Craig Zinkievich; Gordon Fong; Andy Velasquez
- Designers: Zeke Sparkes; Thomas Foss; Randy Mosiondz; Chris Matz; Kevin Stocker
- Programmers: Robert Marr; David Anderson; Casey Miller; Daniel Hogberg; Robert Pasquini
- Platforms: Microsoft Windows, Xbox One, PlayStation 4
- Release: Microsoft Windows; June 20, 2013; Xbox One; March 31, 2015; PlayStation 4 July 19, 2016
- Genre: MMORPG
- Mode: Multiplayer

Neverwinter is a free-to-play massively multiplayer online role-playing game developed by Cryptic Studios for Microsoft Windows in 2013, Xbox One in 2015, and PlayStation 4 in 2016. Based on the fictional Forgotten Realms city of Neverwinter from Dungeons & Dragons, Neverwinter is a standalone game and not part of the previous Neverwinter Nights series.

== Gameplay ==
Players can choose one of eight Dungeons & Dragons character classes and form groups of up to five player characters (PCs). Neverwinter was originally based on a modified version of the Dungeons & Dragons 4th edition rules set. This includes the use of healing powers and action points, the latter of which is implemented through a system referred to as dailies, allowing a player to perform a special ability by accumulating enough action points through combat. A player-created content system codenamed "Foundry" allows players to create their own stories and quests.

It's not an MMO in the sense that there aren't zones with hundreds-and-hundreds of people. You are not fighting for spawns. There's a very strong storyline throughout the game. So it's more of a story-based game closer to things like Dragon Age or Oblivion, which we really try to follow.

— Jack Emmert,

By October 2011, the gameplay of Neverwinter was re-structured into a free-to-play MMORPG with extra items and other advantages available for purchase for a fee.

In August 2014, the Tyranny of Dragons module was used to bridge the narrative gap between the game and the then recently released 5th Edition Dungeons & Dragons. Many of the subsequent modules would have ties to 5th Edition Dungeons & Dragons storylines, such as Elemental Evil, Storm King's Thunder, Tomb of Annihilation, Ravenloft and Undermountain. By April 2019, all eight classes received varying levels of balance and adjustments and each class was renamed to align with 5th Edition Dungeons & Dragons.

== Plot ==
=== Characters and setting ===
The setting of Neverwinter takes place in a time when the eponymous city is plunged into chaos after the disappearance of the last Lord of Neverwinter. In the aftermath of the Spellplague and a Primordial Fire Elemental's almost destroying Neverwinter, as seen in the novel Gauntlgrym, the remaining citizens form factions and struggle for dominance over the populace as the dead begin to rise and attack "the city they once called home". The player is investigating the Sect Crown of Neverwinter and trying to figure out what the skeletons and another mysterious group are looking for. The included locations are based on the novels Gauntlgrym, Neverwinter, and Charon's Claw. Players are also able to create whole new locations that may or may not conform to the lore on which the rest of the game is based. This content is clearly distinguished so as not to confuse users, and they are informed whether they are playing user-generated or official content.

=== Story ===
Briefly assuming her pre-lich appearance, the Lich Queen Valindra attacks the soldiers of New Neverwinter, as new grounds are being built outside of the original city, which is being repaired. Valindra's actions spark the Battle of the Bridge, in which Barrabus the Gray (formerly known as Artemis Entreri) and Drizzt Do'Urden are rumored to be present by gossipers at a pub in the shattered town of Luskan. Each soldier tells his own story of the battle until one soldier reveals that Valindra's attack was going badly until the blue dragon, Fulminorax, a leader in the country of Thay, helped her escape. The soldier finishes by asking the people where they will be and what they will be doing when the dragon attacks again.

After their ship is sunk by a dracolich, adventurers help a nearby militia of Neverwinter against Valindra. While not confronting her directly on the Sleeping Dragon Bridge, the heroes fight a Harbinger, a huge humanoid undead, then go to Protector's Enclave to tell a Sergeant about what happened. For their valor, the adventurers become the Heroes of the Sleeping Bridge. Learning that the Nashers took advantage of Valindra's attack, the heroes track them to the Blacklake District. There they fight a chosen of Ghaunadaur and Nasher leader Karzov. With the Nasher Rebellion ended, the Heroes head to the Cloak Tower and defeat Vansi Bloodscar, an orcish commander from the Kingdom of Many-Arrows.

Sent to help Dorothea Linkletter, the spellscarred wife of Josef Linkletter, the Heroes learn the wizard Rhazzad has sacrificed all the spellscarred victims he hid from Helm's Hold. Learning Rhazzad's masters to be in the Chasm, the heroes defeat the wizard when he turns into a plague-changed monstrosity. Forced to delay going after Rhazzad's masters, the Heroes are put in contact with the Harpers to fight against Malus and Traven Blackdagger. Learning the Blackdagger brothers to have been turned undead by the Thayan necromancer Kallos Tam, the Heroes defeat the pirates and Valindra's agent. Learning the Red Wizard of Thay Xivros plans to raise Arleos the Unforgiven, the Heroes are unable to stop the resurrection but do put down the monster when it rises. The heroes also learn that in another part of Neverdeath Graveyard, Valindra defeated the Cult of the Dragon over the dracolich Azharzel. The Spellplague victims then become a priority again as the Prophet of Helm's Hold has been revealed to be a succubus called Rohini. With the Ashmadai active in Neverwinter, the Heroes raid the fortress, defeat Rohini and slay her green dragon Chartilifax.

When the Barrow Lords and the Netherese necromancer Idris raised the dead of Ebon Downs, the Heroes of the Sleeping Bridge were dispatched and defeated the undead. When the Uthgardt barbarians under the Netherese began to hunt down the Forsworn, the Heroes decided to put an end to the Netherese menace. Stopping Netheril's plans with Xin'Kar, a piece of the Enclave Xinlenal, the Heroes defeated the Uthgardt chieftain and Netherese forces. Joining forces with Company Yargo, the Heroes then took down another Blackdagger Pirate, the undead Bartholomew Blackdagger. Aiding the Icehammer Dwarves, the Heroes proceeded to slay the Frost Giant Hrimnir and destroy the Winterforge. When the Chasm is threatened by the Order of the Blue Fire, the Heroes finally begin to finish off another loose end: Rhazzad's masters. Heading down the Chasm, the Heroes find A'Drx'l, the Aboleth that was guiding Rhazzad, and slay it.

When Drow slavers from House Xorlarrin began appearing and creating a settlement called New Xorlarrin, the Heroes set out to stop them and put an end to their fledgling designs. In doing so, they learned that the Drow Goddess Lolth was trying to take over magic. While the Xorlarrins retreat, the Heroes defeat the Fire Giant Gommoth and red dragon Karrundax. The Xorlarrins retake the abandoned city of Zesraena and fight the Heroes at the Doors of Delzoun in a losing effort. Learning of the Xorlarrin alliance with Illithids, the Heroes fight the Mind Flayers and their Duergar thralls, eventually entering a structure known as the Iron Heart to defeat Yshiggol.

With their strength grown, the Heroes of the Sleeping Bridge decide to end the destructive conflict between Neverwinter and Thay by targeting Valindra Shadowmantle directly. Entering Castle Never, the Heroes fight through hordes of undead and Valindra's most powerful soldiers. Eventually confronting the Lich Queen directly, they defeat her and her dracolich Ahzarzel.

==== The Storm King/Icewind Dale ====
Ice begins to reach south, threatening to wipe out all life in the Dalelands and harm the City. Bryn Shandar comes under attack from hundreds of Frost Giants at the front of an apocalyptic blizzard, freezing the city and turning many of the inhabitants to ice. Artus Cimber arrives and claims that the weather and problems are being caused by the Ring of Winter, which was stolen from him, and that if the heroes can help him find it, he'll be able to reverse the events.

The heroes attempt to sneak into Fangbreaker Keep aboard a Frost Giant ship, but are discovered and are forced to flee. Makos stays behind to cover their escape, and is killed by a Frost Giant. Wulfgar and Cattie-brie recover his body and his is cremated upon return to Bryn Shandar, as Celeste tried and failed to resurrect him.

Cimbar tracks the Ring further north to Cold Run, and the Keep of the Frost Giant King. Upon a Trial, the group of heroes attack the Frost Giant king. Upon his defeat, he attempts to draw more power from the Ring, which backfires and turns him to ice.

==== The Jungles of Chult ====
Neverwinter comes under a death curse. The people of the Sword Coast are dying, although this does not affect any characters not a part of the plot. a mysterious character, later proven to be Makos, proposes that Chult may hold the answer. The player forms a party consisting of various characters in previous adventures including Minsc, Boo, Volo, and Celeste. Arriving in Chult, the group's ship is destroyed by dragon turtle after Volo refuses its demand for payment to enter its waters. Celeste, Cleric of Selûne, is killed by the Batiri, a kobold-like species that inhabit Chult. Finding her body, Makos has her returned to life by a Chultan witch doctor called Nani Pupu by sacrificing a Batiri. This does not resurrect Celeste, however, and she is returned as an undead version to her horror as undead are considered unnatural by her deity. This deviates slightly from established lore where Selûne had been the goddess of the moon and lycanthropy, but none of the source books through the fifth edition list Selûne as having a particular edict against undead.

==== The Cloaked Ascendancy ====
Following completion of the main storyline, Lord Neverember reopens the River District. In the middle of the ceremony, the Nashers, led by three powerful wizards, attack the procession and overrun the rebuilt section of the city, dividing it between themselves with the plan to eventually assault the city proper.

==== New Sharandar ====
Sharandar, destroyed by numerous attacks, is refounded in a new location. Despite efforts to hide, the Fomori launch an assault on the new elven homeland.

==== Descent to Avernus ====
Zariel, Lady of the First Layer of the Nine Hells, captures large swathes of land and drags them into the Hells, intending to use the inhabitants as cannon fodder in the eternal Blood war. The Adventures enter Avernus through the estate of Vallenhas, whose family made a deal with the Demons in order to spare their family. Entering fragments of Zariels memories, they learn Zariel was overpowered in a failed attack on Hell, and was corrupted and turned into an Arch Devil.

Entering the Bleeding Citadel, they find Zariel's divine sword. Using her sword to draw Zariel out of her flying fortress, Zariel is overpowered, and after her defeat, accepts an offer of redemption and resumes her angelic form, and takes command of the Citadel as a temporary beachhead to launch attacks into Avernus.

==== The Dragonbone Valley ====
Lich Queen Valindra, having restored herself after her defeat at Neverwinter, attempts to create a Mythal, an incredibly powerful form of ritual magic, that will turn every dragon in Faerun into a dracolich. The adventurer receives a plea from Elminster to come and support the Grand Alliance to stop the Thayans and Valindra. After collecting a handful of artifacts to reach the ritual site, Elminster and the dragon Galanthaxsis interrupt the ritual at the last moment, causing it to detonate and obliterate a chunk of the valley.

== Development and release ==
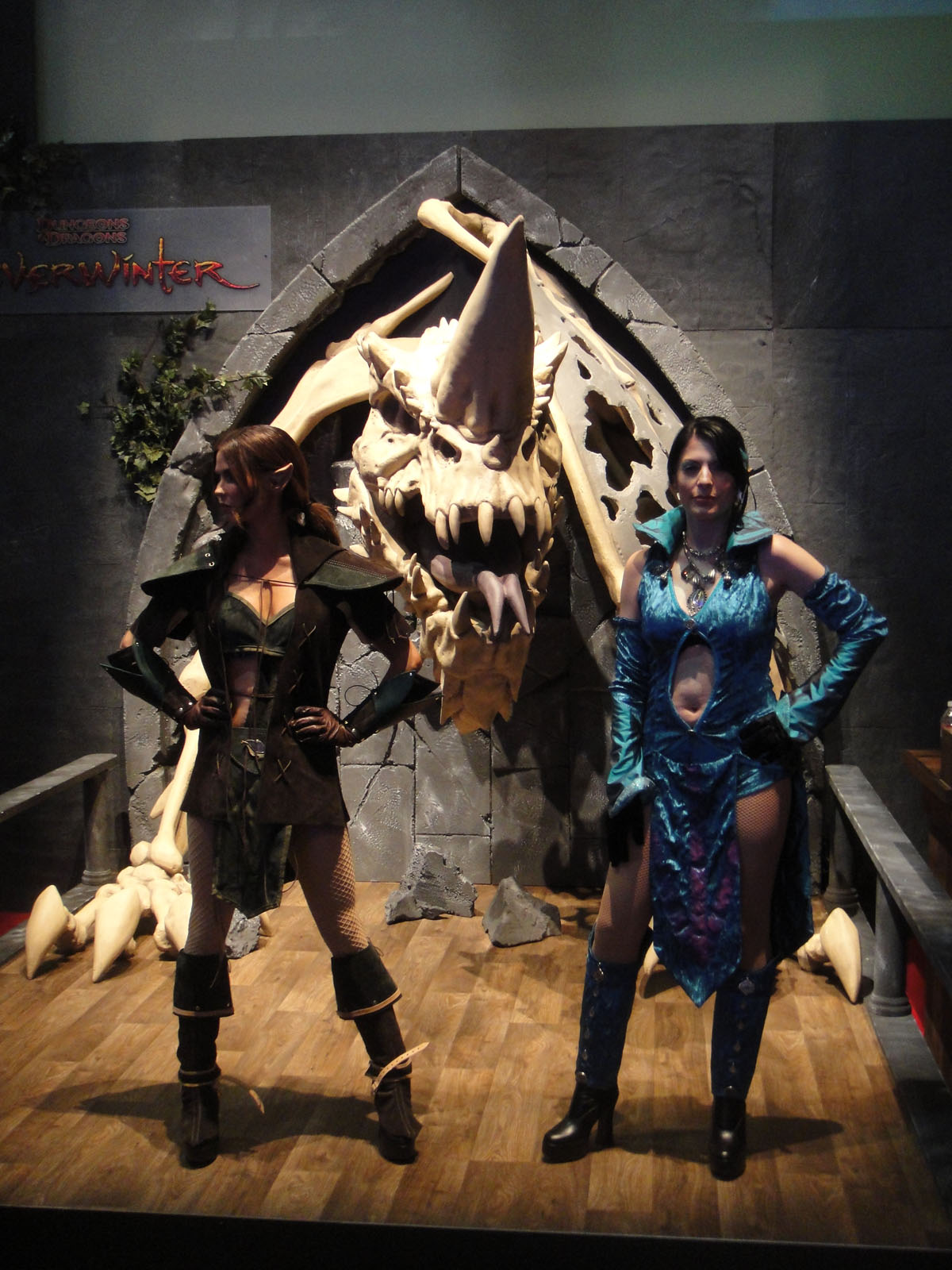
Promotion at E3 2012

Atari bought Cryptic Studios in the fall of 2009. In late August 2010, Atari announced Neverwinter, to be developed by Cryptic Studios, with a release scheduled for late 2011. By May 2011, Atari was in the process of selling Cryptic Studios, stating that development of Neverwinter would continue as normal, but only for the time being.

The game was first publicly displayed at E3 2011, where many details about the game were revealed. The game was originally scheduled to be released as a cross media event coinciding with the release of a series of four books by fantasy author R.A. Salvatore and a tabletop game from Wizards of the Coast. Laura Tommervik, a member of Wizards of the Coast marketing team, explained that they used Neverwinter as the connective tissue across multiple product categories as part of the transmedia campaign for fans to experience the brand they choose to.

Due to Cryptic's acquisition by Perfect World Entertainment, Neverwinter was delayed to 2012. Perfect World also bought the rights to publish the game from Atari, coinciding with the conclusion of Atari's lawsuit with Wizards of the Coast on the Dungeons & Dragons license. By October, Neverwinter was shifted from the co-operative multiplayer game into a free-to-play MMORPG, which further delayed the game to late 2012. Perfect World would later again delay Neverwinter into early 2013 to better polish the game.

Prior to releasing major details on the game, Perfect World launched a viral marketing campaign called the "Siege of Neverwinter", featuring videos from the game's story. The game was at Penny Arcade Expo (Pax) East 2012, where it was awarded Best of Show by MMORPG.com. In the same month of showing at PAX East, it also appeared at Gamescom, where it showed off its Events feature, and Gen Con Indy, where it let attendees try out early version drow race characters. The game's campaign was revealed to feature sixty levels. The game ran closed beta testing from February 8 to April 14, 2013, before open beta began on April 30.

Shannon Appelcline, author of the Designers & Dragons series, wrote that the "Neverwinter Campaign Setting was launched as 4e's first major multimedia release — a marketing approach that Wizards would regularly use in later years. It was closely tied to a series of four novels, a comic book, two different computer games, and even a board game. [...] Two more Neverwinter computer games were appearing thanks to Wizards' 'transmedia' campaign. A new MMORPG simply called "Neverwinter" was to be the center of the Neverwinter rollout, but was delayed for two years due to the resolution of a computer gaming lawsuit and the subsequent sale of the developer, Cryptic Studios. [...] Neverwinter (2013) finally appears only after the rest of the launch. It continues to be supported to this day and has participated in some of D&D 5e's multimedia rollouts".

In June 2018, Cryptic Studios revealed that over the course of five years:

- "The near 18 million players amount to 775 times the population of Neverwinter".
- "Players have died 202 million times".
- "The deadliest dungeon is the Temple of Lostmauth".
- The most popular race is humans followed by Tieflings.
- The most popular class is Great Weapon Fighter followed by Trickster Rogue and Hunter Ranger.
- 63 million monsters have been killed including more than 6.5 million dragons.

== Modules ==
Neverwinter has released multiple updates to the game called modules. Modules were initially released first on the PC, and then later to consoles. With Northdark Reaches, the modules were released simultaneously on PC, Xbox, and PlayStation.

Module	PC release date	Game updates
Fury of the Feywild	August 22, 2013	A new zone called Sharandar. New professions, loot, dungeons. A new campaign system.
Shadowmantle	December 5, 2013	New Hunter Ranger playable class, new Paragon Paths, and a new dungeon. Added the Dread Ring Campaign. Added an Artifacts System and a Collections System.
Curse of Icewind Dale	May 13, 2014	Added a PvP Campaign and two-faction open PvP zone. Added a PvE Campaign and two new adventure zones.
Tyranny of Dragons	August 14, 2014	Bridges the narrative gap between the game and 5th Edition Dungeons and Dragons. Added Tyranny of Dragons Campaign. Added Scourge Warlock class and Dragonborn playable race.
Rise of Tiamat	November 18, 2014	Expansion of the Tyranny of Dragons Campaign and added Well of Dragons zone. Added a new Paragon Path, a profession and new artifacts.
Elemental Evil	April 7, 2015	Level Cap increased to 70 (previously capped at 60). Profession maximum level increased to 25. Added Paladin class. Added Elemental Evil Campaign.
Strongholds	August 11, 2015	Added Guild Strongholds and Stronghold Siege PvP. Added a dragon flight co-op event
Underdark	November 17, 2015	Added Underdark Campaign which included a unique questline written by R.A. Salvatore.
The Maze Engine	March 15, 2016	Added The Maze Engine Campaign and other campaign updates. A reworked Castle Never. Updated content and visuals to four returning regular dungeons and one returning epic.
Storm King's Thunder	August 16, 2016	Added Storm King's Thunder Campaign. Added a new dungeon and three new zones: Bryn Shander, Lonelywood, and Cold Run. Class Balance updates for three classes: Hunter Ranger, Guardian Fighter, and Scourge Warlock.
Sea of Moving Ice	November 8, 2016	Added expansion to Storm King's Thunder Campaign. Introduced a new zone, travel options (like a kayak), artifact weapons, treasure hunt, a 10-player battle, and a fishing minigame.
The Cloaked Ascendancy	February 21, 2017	Added The Cloaked Ascendancy Campaign. New adventure zone (The River District), new skirmish (The Illusionist's Gambit) and new artifact weapons. Return and redesign of Spellplague Caverns Dungeon.
Shroud of Souls	May 2, 2017	Added expansion to The Cloaked Ascendancy Campaign. Added new Guild content and Stronghold structures.
Tomb of Annihilation	July 25, 2017	Added Jungles of Chult Campaign. Added two new adventure zones: Port Nyanzaru and Soshenstar River. Added new end-game Dungeon: Tomb of the Nine Gods.
Swords of Chult	October 24, 2017	Expansion to Tomb of Annihilation module. Added new five-player skirmish and a major update to the PVP system. Updated inventory management and refinement systems.
Lost City of Omu	February 27, 2018	Expansion to Tomb of Annihilation module. Adds new zones and more endgame content
Ravenloft	June 26, 2018	Added Ravenloft Campaign. New adventure zone (Barovia) and a new endgame dungeon (Castle Ravenloft). Added a day-night cycle.
The Heart of Fire	November 6, 2018	Added Acquisitions Incorporated Campaign. Class balance updates and an overhaul to the profession system.
Undermountain	April 23, 2019	Level Cap increased to 80 (previously capped at 70). Added Undermountain Campaign. Added five adventure zones: Yawning Portal, Catacombs, Twisted Caverns, Wyllowwood, Terminus and Vanrakdoom. All eight classes received varying levels of balance and adjustments. Each class was renamed to align with 5th Edition Dungeons & Dragons. Redesigned Companions System and rewards overhaul.
Uprising	August 13, 2019	New gith playable race. A new PvP map and a new 10-player end game Trial against Halaster Blackcloak in his Undermountain lair. Fashion system overhaul.
Infernal Descent	January 21, 2020	New Storyline: Infernal Descent. Descent into Avernus Campaign. Vallenhas adventure zone. Infernal Citadel dungeon. Expedition Pack of Twisted Shadows.
Avernus	June 30, 2020	New adventure zones: Avernus Wastes, the Bleeding Citadel, and the Wandering Emporium. An overhaul to all healing classes. An overhaul to the mounts system. An overhaul to the companions system. A combat rework that included significant changes to statistics, ratings, and item level. Changes to chest rewards from Queues. Damage (DPS) class rebalancing. New campaign: Path of the Fallen. New, limited time, campaign: the Redeemed Citadel. Added epic trials: Zariel's Challenge and Zariel's Challenge (Master). Scaling changes when going to a zone meant for characters of higher or lower levels. New reward hunts (used to obtain rare equipment).
Sharandar	February 16, 2021	This was the first update to eliminate a previously introduced expansion. Removal of the old Sharandar campaign introduced in "Fury of the Feywild". Added adventure zone: New Sharandar. Added epic dungeon: Vault of Stars.
Jewel of the North	July 27, 2021	New class: bard. Revamped leveling system. The maximum level was reduced to 20, down from 80. This brought the game inline with the desktop level system. Revamped tutorial systems. Introduction of the "Battle Pass" campaign system to the game, allowing players to receive a "free" tier of rewards but optionally buy a paid version of premium rewards. New battle pass campaign: Echoes of Prophecy.
Dragonbone Vale	January 11, 2022	Large overhaul to enchantments and refining, eliminating the previous enchantments and introducing new ones. Added campaign: Dragonbone Vale Campaign. Added battle pass campaign: Draconic Rage. New epic trial: Crown of Keldegonn (Master). New adventure zone: The Dragonbone Vale.
Dragonslayer	June 14, 2022	The Well of Dragons introduced in "Tyranny of Dragons" was reworked to be a campaign and many of the zones added for that expansion were removed. Queue System Rework: the random queues that players may use were reworked, adjusting the item level requirements to join each one. Rise of Tiamat: this trial was changed from 20 players to 10, and the mechanics were completely reworked. A "master" version was also added with a higher item-level requirement. Demogorgon: similar changes were made to those of the Rise of Tiamat. The trial mechanics were changed and the difficulty substantially increased. This resulted in Demogorgon being removed from the random queues due to player abandonment and player-base complained and it had not been reinstated as of 2023. Queue adjustment: Skirmishes set to 20,000 item level; Dungeons set to 25,000 item level; Trials set to 30,000 item level; Advanced Dungeons set to at least 35,000 item level; Tower of the Mad Mage increased to 50,000 item level; Zariel's Challenge (Master) increased to 55,000 item level; Crown of Keldegonn (Master) increased to 65,000 item level; Random queue rewards were changed generally to increase the rewards for both having new players in the attempt and the overall rewards obtained for completing the queue. Chest rewards were adjusted to increase the odds of a "high" reward on the first roll. The number of reroll attempts was reduced from four to two. The cost for rerolling was doubled if using the astral diamond currency. Dragon Hunts were introduced. There were three tiers of dragons: baby, adult, and ancient. Baby hunts were for solo play only; adult hunts were for three players; ancient hunts required five players. The difficulty increased with each tier, as did the possible rewards. Players could unlock modifiers to make the hunts harder but add the chance of rewards dropping that could be used to purchase or upgrade equipment. These rewards could not be obtained any other way in the game at launch. Each dragon color (red, green, white, black, and blue) had different mechanics to the fight.
Northdark Reaches	November 8, 2022	New Adventure Zone: Northdark Reaches: explores the events that take place between Starlight Enclave and Glacier's Edge, the first two books in The Way of the Drow trilogy by RA Salvatore. It was developed in collaboration with R. A. Salvatore and Geno Salvatore. Dungeon Rework: Temple of the Spider: the original "temple of the spider" dungeon released with the launch of the game was replaced with a modified version. Addition of a master difficulty level to this dungeon. Normal dungeon requires an item level of 25,000, with master requiring 75,000. Wizard Updates Inventory System Updates: A wide swath of quality-of-life improvements were made to the inventory interface including search functionality, bags except "main" and "overflow" can now be given custom names, bags may be targeted to receive specific item types when gained by the player, and players can hot-swap a bag for another bag without needing to empty it first so long as there's enough space in the new bag. A new battle pass was introduced.
Menzoberranzan	March 28, 2023	New Campaign & Adventure Zone: Menzoberranzan New Trial: Gzemnid's Reliquary Companion Updates Mount Updates New Lockbox: Lolthian Lockbox New Battle Pass
Demonweb Pits	July 18, 2023	Campaign & Adventure Zone: Narbondellyn New Dungeon: Demonweb Pits New Planar Panic Lockbox New Battle Pass Abyssal Hunts Hero's Path
Spelljammer	November 7, 2023	
Adventures in Wildspace	April 23, 2024	
Mountain of Flame	July 16, 2024	
As Above, So Below - Return to Pirates' Skyhold	November 19, 2024	
Red Harvest	May 6, 2025	

== Reception ==
Reception

Aggregate score
Aggregator	Score
Metacritic	PC: 74/100; XONE: 66/100; PS4: 74/100

Review scores
Publication	Score
Eurogamer	6/10
GameSpot	6.0/10
GamesRadar+	4/5
IGN	6.8/10

Neverwinter has attained a score of 74/100 from aggregate review website Metacritic.

=== Microsoft Windows ===
In 2013, Daniel Tack of Forbes wrote: "Neverwinter offers experiences for players that normally wouldn't play MMORPGs, and also provides a framework for core genre players. Looking for action and adventure in the world of Forgotten Realms? Neverwinter delivers". Stephanie Carmichael, for VentureBeat in the same year, wrote that "it may have its flaws, but Neverwinter is highly enjoyable and accessible to veteran, beginner, and casual players alike".

=== Xbox One ===
In 2015, the Polygon review reported that "Neverwinter on Xbox One manages to map heroes' abilities effortlessly across the controller, in a scheme that feels great both in and out of combat. Unfortunately, other aspects of the port totally miss the mark; in terms of performance, Neverwinter on Xbox One can really take a dive".

In the same year, Boston Blake, for GameRant, wrote that "Neverwinter is the first true MMO for Xbox One, and it delivers well on that premise" and "despite its PvP shortcomings and current framrate issues, Neverwinter proves to be a solid MMO for Xbox One owners. Although it's certainly not a hardcore MMORPG, it's a fantastic starting point for console gamers or those who have little experience in the genre. Those who venture through the game will discover an enjoyable and challenging adventure that keeps their attention, provides plenty of unique experiences, and keeps them coming back for more".

=== PlayStation 4 ===
In 2016, Ryan Winslett, for CinemaBlend, wrote that "since Neverwinter has proven to be a solid action MMO, you really have nothing to lose by giving it a shot".

In the same year, Jason Bohn, for Hardcore Gamer, wrote: "Taking on a review of a title the size and scope of Cryptic Studio's Neverwinter is a daunting process, to put it mildly. The thing is just gigantic". He also added that "for no cost (not even a PlayStation Plus subscription is required), players can jump in and play one of the best MMORPGs available on the market at any price point today".
