= Player's Guide =

Player's Guide may refer to:

- Strategy guide
- Nintendo Player's Guide

== Tabletop role playing game sourcebooks ==
- Player's Guide to Eberron
- Player's Guide to Faerûn
- Player's Guide to the Dragonlance Campaign
- Player's Guide to the Forgotten Realms Campaign
- Forgotten Realms Player's Guide
- Greyhawk Player's Guide
