= Efron =

Efron is a Jewish surname. It is taken from the Biblical place name, Hebrew: עפרון. Another version to it is the demonym Efroni (עפרוני).

Notable people with the surname include:

- Bradley Efron (born 1938), American statistician
- Edith Efron (1922–2001), American libertarian
- Inés Efron (born 1984), Argentine actress
- Jonathan Efron, U.S. colorectal surgeon
- Marshall Efron (1938–2019), American actor
- Nora Ephron (1941–2012) playwright, screenwriter, novelist, producer, director
- Paloma Efron (1912–1977), Argentine singer
- Reuben Efron, American CIA official
- Sergei Efron (1893–1941), Russian poet, officer of White Army and later NKVD agent
- Zac Efron (born 1987), American actor

== See also ==
- Efron's dice, a set of four nontransitive dice invented by Bradley Efron
- Brockhaus and Efron Encyclopedic Dictionary
- Ephron
- Effron
- sv:Vera Efron (born 1959), an editor and author in Sweden
