= Frozenfar =

Frozenfar may refer to:

- Frozenfar (Forgotten Realms), a fictional region in the Forgotten Realms campaign setting.
