= Ephron =

Ephron is a Jewish surname. Notable people with the surname include:

- Ephron (biblical figure), Hittite who sold a cave to Abraham according to the Bible
- A family of American writers:
  - Henry Ephron (1911–1992), father
  - Phoebe Ephron (1914–1971), mother
  - Amy Ephron (born 1952), daughter
  - Delia Ephron (born 1944), daughter
  - Hallie Ephron (born 1948), daughter, sometimes writes as G. H. Ephron
  - Nora Ephron (1941–2012), daughter
- Theron Ephron Catlin (1878–1960), American politician from Missouri

== See also ==
- Efron
