= Brimstone Angels =

Fantasy novel by Erin M. Evans

- Author: Erin M. Evans
- Cover artist: Kekai Kotaki
- Language: English
- Series: Brimstone Angels Saga
- Genre: Fantasy novel
- Published: November 2011
- Publication place: United States
- Media type: Print (Paperback)
- Pages: 339
- ISBN: 978-0-7869-5846-7
- Followed by: Lesser Evils

Brimstone Angels is a fantasy novel by Erin M. Evans based on the Dungeons & Dragons role-playing game, set largely in the city of Neverwinter within the world of the Forgotten Realms.

== Plot summary ==
Farideh and Havilar are tiefling sisters whose mother abandoned at birth and have been raised by their adoptive father Mehen in an isolated village. Farideh makes a pact with the devil Lorcan that gives her special powers. Mehen and the two sisters subsequently move to Neverwinter to work as bounty hunters based out of that city. There they find themselves pawns in a far-reaching supernatural plot.

== Publication history ==
Brimstone Angels, written by Erin M. Evans, with cover art by Kekai Kotaki, was published by Wizards of the Coast in November 2011 (ISBN 978-0-7869-5846-7) as a 339-page paperback. It is the first novel in the six-part "Brimstone Angels Saga" series:

1. Brimstone Angels
2. Lesser Evils (2012)
3. The Adversary (2013)
4. Fire in the Blood (2014)
5. Ashes of the Tyrant (2015)
6. The Devil You Know (2016)

== Reception ==
Brimstone Angels was #9 on CBR's 2020 "10 Of The Best DnD Stories To Start Off With" list — the article states that "What makes The Brimstone Angels a great novel for those starting with D & D is that it provides a great amount of insight into the Tieflings' mindset and society. The novel's narrative also provides insight into how a party member's background can provide a great seed for interesting adventures."

Brimstone Angels appeared on the 2024 Game Rant "31 Best Dungeons & Dragons Novels, Ranked" list at #5.

Brimstone Angels appeared on the 2025 Screen Rant "10 Best Forgotten Realms Book Series, Ranked" list at #3.
