= Effron =

Effron is a surname (Not to be confused with Efron. See the "See Also" section). Notable people with the surname include:

- Andrew S. Effron (born 1948), former Chief Judge
- Blair Effron (born 1962), American financier
- David Effron (born 1938), American conductor and educator
- José Effron (born 1986), Argentine Paralympic judoka

== See also ==
- Efron
