= Player's Guide to the Forgotten Realms Campaign =

1993 Dungeons & Dragons supplement

- Genre: Role-playing games
- Publisher: TSR
- Publication date: 1993

Player's Guide to the Forgotten Realms Campaign is an accessory for the 2nd edition of the Advanced Dungeons & Dragons fantasy role-playing game.

== Contents ==
Player's Guide to the Forgotten Realms Campaign illustrates key concepts in the Forgotten Realms setting with original fiction, essays, graphics, and sidebars, and does not include game mechanics, character stats, and role-playing game jargon. The Player's Guide to the Forgotten Realms Campaign includes fiction and source book material which takes the form of a journal detailing the travels of an eclectic adventuring party, including a gnome illusionist, a halfling thief, and a human ranger. The party assembles to "travel the Realms extensively, witnessing as many of its wonders as time and fate will allow", and they cover a lot of territory. Beginning in Waterdeep, the companions wind their way through Neverwinter, the High Moor, and the Forgotten Forest on the first leg of the trip. The finale ends with them in the dungeons of Zhentil Keep, setting the stage for a sequel that the reader can design. The source material, confined to brief sidebars, covers topics such as druidic circles, the Harpers, and the Red Wizards of Thay.

== Publication history ==
Player's Guide to the Forgotten Realms Campaign is an Advanced Dungeons & Dragons game supplement published as a 132-page softcover book by TSR, Inc. Design is by Anthony Herring with additional material by Jeff Grubb, Karen Boomgarden, Julia Martin, Steven Schend, J. Robert King, and Tim Beach, and editing by Jonatha Ariadne Caspian. Illustrations are by Valerie Valusek with a cover by Larry Elmore.

== Reception ==
Rick Swan reviewed the Player's Guide to the Forgotten Realms Campaign for Dragon magazine #210 (October 1994). Having also reviewed the Player's Guide to the Dragonlance Campaign in the same column, he declares: "For the hapless souls intimidated by the sprawl of Dragonlance (and the equally imposing Forgotten Realms setting) TSR comes to the rescue with these two Player's Guides. While the content is familiar—old hat, in fact, to veteran AD&D game players—the format is brand-new. Gone are [...] everything that makes novices feel like they've wandered into a foreign country. Instead of using rules, the books illustrate key concepts with original fiction, as whimsical as fairy tales and a treat to read." He commented that "What the fiction lacks in narrative drive, it makes up in fanciful encounters [...] and evocative details [...] It's lightweight fun, the gaming equivalent of a strawberry sundae." He found that much of the source material "seems trivial. Why devote a full page to a discussion of wine? Why describe eight types of bread? Do we really need to know about ten different cheeses? More essays about magic and history would've been preferable to all the groceries. And there's a bit too much fiction for my taste, comprising perhaps two-thirds of the text." Swan concluded his review by saying: "Make no mistake. These books are intended as introductions, providing broad overviews for beginners. Serious players who want serious answers can skip the Player's Guides and go right to the Tales of the Lance boxed set (for the Dragonlance setting) and the revised in 1993 edition Forgotten Realms Campaign Setting set. But if you’re not ready for the big time, or if you're more curious than committed, try the Player's Guides first."

== Reviews ==
- Rollespilsmagasinet Fønix (Danish) (Issue 1 - March/April 1994)
