= Jonathan Efron =

U.S. colorectal surgeon and hospital administrator

- Born: Jonathan Edward Efron
- Education: Franklin & Marshall College; University of Maryland School of Medicine
- Scientific career
- Fields: Gastrointestinal surgery
- Workplaces: Mayo Clinic Alix School of Medicine; Johns Hopkins University

Jonathan Edward Efron is a U.S. colorectal surgeon and hospital administrator. He holds the Mark M. Ravitch, M.D. endowed professorship in gastrointestinal surgery. He is the senior vice president of the Office of Johns Hopkins Physicians.

== Life ==
Efron earned a B.A. from Franklin & Marshall College in 1989. He completed an M.D. at the University of Maryland School of Medicine in 1993. He completed a residency in general surgery at North Shore University Hospital and a fellowship in colorectal surgery at the Cleveland Clinic Florida.

In 2005, Efron joined the Mayo Clinic Alix School of Medicine as an associate professor of surgery. In 2009, he joined the Johns Hopkins School of Medicine as an associate professor of surgery. He later became the Mark M. Ravitch, M.D. endowed professor of gastrointestinal surgery. In 2015, he was made executive vice director of the Johns Hopkins Hospital department of surgery. He is senior vice president of the Office of Johns Hopkins Physicians.
