= Charon's Claw (novel) =

2012 novel by R. A. Salvatore

- Cover of the first edition
- Author: R. A. Salvatore
- Cover artist: Todd Lockwood
- Language: English
- Series: Neverwinter Saga
- Genre: Fantasy novel
- Published: 2012
- Publisher: Wizards of the Coast
- Publication place: United States
- Media type: Print (hardcover and paperback)
- Pages: 352
- ISBN: 978-0786962235 (first edition, hardcover)
- OCLC: 768799542
- Dewey Decimal: 813.54
- LC Class: PS3569.A462345 C48
- Preceded by: Neverwinter
- Followed by: The Last Threshold

Charon's Claw is a novel set in the Forgotten Realms campaign world by R. A. Salvatore released on August 7, 2012. This is the third book in the Neverwinter Saga and follows the adventure of Drizzt Do'Urden and Dahlia. The resurrected Artemis Entreri also joins the team. This story is set days after the events of Neverwinter and brings back returning characters while introducing new ones.

== Plot summary ==
The story begins in the year 1463 DR with a meeting of the Xorlarrin House of Menzoberranzan. Ravel, the second boy and spellspinner of the house, proposes a plan to take Gauntlgrym as their own and establish a new drow city with them as the rulers. Matron Mother Zeerith Xorlarrin approves an expedition to Gauntlgrym led by Ravel. The rest of the party consists of Brach'Thal, a mage of diminished power since the Spellplague and Ravel's older brother and father; Jaerth, the house weapon master; and Saribel and Berellip, priestess sisters of Ravel. Nearly 100 mercenaries are hired, consisting mostly of houseless rogue drows, a drider named Yerrininae and his twenty warriors, and a host of goblin slaves. Tiago Baenre is also sent by Matron Mother Triel Baenre to ensure the journey goes according to her wishes, and is accompanied by Gol'fanin, a master drow blacksmith.

Drizzt and Dahlia begin their journey back to Neverwinter. Close by, Effron spies on them unnoticed and prepares the Shadovar mercenaries of Cavus Dun for an ambush on the two with the desired result being Drizzt's death and Dahlia's capture. The force consists of Jermander, leader and swordsman; Ratsis, spider tamer; Parbid and Afafrenfere, warrior monks and friends; Amber Gristle O' Maul ("Ambergris"), a dwarven priestess; Bol, a large tiefling warrior; Horrible, a silent female warrior; and Shifter, a powerful Shadovar mage.

The struggle for power in Neverwinter continues, with Herzgo Alegni declaring himself ruler, despite opposition by Jelvus Grinch and the citizens of Neverwinter. Arunika, the succubus, and her partner Brother Anthus strive to find a way to weaken Herzgo's rule while waiting for the eventual return of the Aboleth Sovereignty. Arunika goes to the site of the Dread Ring to find the lich Valindra Shadowmatle and instead finds her imp familiar Invidoo and a zombie Sylora bent in half unable to walk. Invidoo wants his freedom from service and Arunika will grant it to him if he can find a replacement for himself who is familiar with Drizzt.

Artemis Entreri, still susceptible to the control of Charon's Claw, decides to seek out Drizzt and Dahlia in hopes of the three of them defeating Alegni and freeing himself of the sword's servitude. The Cavus Dun mercenary force ambushes Drizzt and Dahlia, and during an extended battle, Entreri arrives and saves Dahlia from a snare set by Ratsis' spiders. Bol, Parbid, Horrible, and Jermander are killed during the fight, and Shifter and Ratsis flee. In the confusion Ambergris knocks out Afafrenfere and carries him off, and the two of them return to Neverwinter together.

Drizzt, Dahlia, and Artemis join forces and travel to Neverwinter together. Dahlia and Artemis begin to share a common bond because of the pain they have shared at the hands of Herzgo, a bond that Drizzt does not share.

In the Underdark, a power struggle begins to develop between the priestesses, Ravel, and Tiago as to whom is in charge. Eventually they reach Gauntlgrym and defeat the dwarf ghosts guarding the city. Tiago then puts his support behind Ravel, giving him the upper hand over his two priestess sisters. Ravel and the rest begin the process of clearing out the city and reactivating the forge of Gauntlygrym. Brach'Thal, though greatly diminished in power, is instrumental in this as he is a master of controlling elementals.

Drizzt, Dahlia, and Entreri sneak into Neverwinter through the sewers. Herzgo confronts the three companions on the Herzgo Alegni Bridge, having learned of their presence from Invidoo's imp replacement. The companions win the ensuing battle, and when Herzgo tries to escape through a shadow gate, he is tackled by Guenhwyvar. They both go through the gate to the Shadowfell, where Guenhwyvar is held captive by Draygo Quick. Draygo charges Herzgo with retrieving Charon's Claw, making it clear that failure is not an option.

Ambergris and Glorfathel (an elf mage agent of Draygo Quick) watch as the battle ends, and the Shadovar are quickly outmatched by their opposition. Glorfathel decides that the battle is lost, and enables the retreat of the rest of the Shadovar to the Shadowfell. Ambergris stays behind and approaches the companions, offering to heal their wounds, and points Drizzt towards Arunika, who informs him that Guenhwyvar is no longer connected to the onyx figurine.

With Drizzt having retrieved Charon's Claw after the battle, the companions decide to head to Gauntlgrym, as the primordial is their best chance to destroy the sword. Upon entering Gauntlgrym, the Shifter approaches Drizzt and offers to give back Guenhwyvar in exchange for Charon's Claw, an offer that is refused by Drizzt.

Glorfathel, Ambergris and Afafrenfere enter Gauntlgrym in pursuit of Drizzt, and the Shadovar teleport in to the city to intercept the three companions as well. A fight ensues, but is interrupted as they are ambushed by Ravel's drow force. The three are captured by the drow, but Entreri is able to convince the drow that they are agents of Bregen D'aerthe, and the drow decide to let them go. All the drow except for Brach'thal (who has allied with the primordial) retreat to the lower levels as the battle between the primordial elementals, the Shadovar, and the three companions intensifies. This interrupts Gol'fanin's ongoing work on a sword and shield of great magical power for Tiago.

Herzgo prepares to confront the three companions and sends Ambergris, Afafrenfere, Glorfathel, and Effron to stop them from escaping. Ambergris betrays the others by throwing Glorfathel into the lava pit, stunning Afafrenfere with magic, and attacking Effron. Meanwhile, Dhalia and Entreri engage Herzgo's remaining forces, allowing Drizzt to slip by, confront and kill Brach'Thal, and get to the primordial pit.

As the battle has become lost, Herzgo tells Effron to retreat and is about to do so himself when Drizzt wills Charon's Claw to call to Herzgo with a vision of the sword being thrown into the maw of the primordial, begging for him to save it. This distraction provides an opening for Dahlia to launch an attack on Herzgo, killing him.

Dahlia continues to brutalize the dead body of Herzgo when Effron calls out in anguish to his dead father, revealing Effron, Herzgo, and Dahlia's true relationship for the first time. With nothing left standing in their way, Drizzt throws Charon's Claw into the pit, expecting this action to kill Artemis Entreri as well. The sword is destroyed but Artemis lives, for reasons none of the companions understand.

In the Shadowfell, Effron begins to plot his revenge on Dahlia, with Draygo Quick's blessing. Afafrenfere attempts to attack Drizzt but Ambergris stops him and then places a geas on him so that he cannot ever attack Drizzt, earning Drizzt's trust (she later reveals the geas to be a fake). Tiago, realizing that all the opposition has left Gauntlgrym, urges Gol'fanin to return to the forge and complete his work on the sword and shield.

In the throne room, Pwent returns to life as an undead vampire. Invidoo's replacement imp is revealed to be Druzil, servant of Errtu, whose hundred years of banishment are almost over and is plotting his revenge on Drizzt. Back in the forge room Gol'fanin reveals to Tiago that the drow he thought was an agent of Bregen D'aerthe was actually Drizzt Do'Urden. He points out that the sword and shield he is forging will give him the power to become house weapon master, but the head of Drizzt would make him a legend.

== Reception ==
Charon's Claw reached 13 on The New York Times bestseller list on August 26, 2012.

The book entered the USA Today Top 150 on August 16, 2012, and was on the USA Today Best-Selling Books list for 1 week, with #55 as its best week.
