= Player's Guide to the Dragonlance Campaign =

1993 Advanced Dungeons & Dragons supplement

- Cover to Player's Guide to the Dragonlance Campaign
- Genre: Role-playing games
- Publisher: TSR
- Publication date: 1993

Player's Guide to the Dragonlance Campaign is an accessory for the 2nd edition of the Advanced Dungeons & Dragons fantasy role-playing game, published in 1993.

== Contents ==
Player's Guide to the Dragonlance Campaign illustrates key concepts in the Dragonlance setting with original fiction, essays, graphics, and sidebars, and does not include game mechanics, character stats, and role-playing game jargon. The Player's Guide to the Dragonlance Campaign includes a large selection of maps and portraits. Focusing on the continent of Ansalon, where most Dragonlance campaigns take place, the first half of the book comprises a guided tour of major locations, using first-person narratives. The tale of a seafaring Kagonesti elf, for example, sets up an overview of the empire of Ergoth. An encounter with a pirate ship leads into a look at the dwarven land of Kayolin. Each entry features concise but informative sections on culture, climate, and trade. The book also introduces a gallery of personalities, among them the undead Lord Soth and Sivart of the Kagonesti. The second half of the book contains less fiction but more history, which emphasizes gully dwarves, tinker gnomes, and other Ansalon races.

== Publication history ==
Player's Guide to the Dragonlance Campaign is an Advanced Dungeons & Dragons game supplement published as a 128-page softcover book by TSR, Inc. The source material was by David "Zeb" Cook, Michael Dobson, Jeff Grubb, Tracy Hickman, Harold Johnson, Douglas Niles, and Margaret Weis, with compilation, editing, and original material by Jonatha Ariadne Caspian. Illustrations are by Denis Beauvais, Jeff Butler, Clyde Caldwell, Larry Elmore, Stephen Fabian, Keith Parkinson, Robin Raab, and Valerie Valusek.

== Reception ==
Gene Alloway reviewed Player's Guide to the Dragon Lance Campaign in White Wolf #45 (July, 1994), rating it a 3 out of 5 and stated that "There's a huge amount of background material here, and the price is good. Be warned, though, that the Guide duplicates information found in the main Dragon Lance set. Although this book is useful, I prefer the AD&D Player's Handbook as a model to give players at the start of a campaign; spells, magic rules and race states would have been useful in this book."

Rick Swan reviewed the Player's Guide to the Dragonlance Campaign for Dragon magazine #210 (October 1994). Having also reviewed the Player's Guide to the Forgotten Realms Campaign in the same column, he declares: "For the hapless souls intimidated by the sprawl of Dragonlance (and the equally imposing Forgotten Realms setting) TSR comes to the rescue with these two Player's Guides. While the content is familiar—old hat, in fact, to veteran AD&D game players—the format is brand-new. Gone are [...] everything that makes novices feel like they've wandered into a foreign country. Instead of using rules, the books illustrate key concepts with original fiction, as whimsical as fairy tales and a treat to read." Swan called the Player's Guide to the Dragonlance Campaign "the better of the two", explaining that it "boasts crisp writing and a generous selection of maps and portraits". He also felt that "Lucid explanations make this a good resource as well as a good read. Take, for instance, the Knights of Solamnia, an order of chivalrous warriors who fell out of favor prior to the War of the Lance. The responsibilities and membership requirements of the knights have been discussed in umpteen previous supplements [...] But for the novice, the game lingo in the earlier books made life difficult; it's hard to get a handle on the ethos of a Knight of the Rose when you're still struggling with proficiency bonuses. The Player's Guide, however, provides clutter-free summaries. A novice who doesn't know a proficiency bonus from a ping-pong ball will come away with a clear understanding of the Rose Knights' commitment to justice and how it relates to the legacy of Huma Dragonbane." Swan did have a few complaints: "By downplaying the conflict between good and evil that forms the backbone of the Dragonlance mythos, the book fails to capture the epic scope of the early novels. [...] Familiar characters, such as Flint Fireforge and Sturm Brightblade, receive only single-paragraph biographies. For those interested in using Ansalon as a campaign setting, it would've been nice to suggest which supplements they need. Swan concluded his review by saying: "Make no mistake. These books are intended as introductions, providing broad overviews for beginners. Serious players who want serious answers can skip the Player's Guides and go right to the Tales of the Lance boxed set (for the Dragonlance setting) and the revised in 1993 edition Forgotten Realms Campaign Setting set. But if you’re not ready for the big time, or if you're more curious than committed, try the Player's Guides first."

== Reviews ==
- Australian Realms #14
