= The Last Threshold =

2013 novel by R. A. Salvatore

- Cover of the first edition
- Author: R. A. Salvatore
- Cover artist: Todd Lockwood
- Language: English
- Series: Neverwinter Saga
- Genre: Fantasy novel
- Set in: Forgotten Realms
- Publisher: Wizards of the Coast
- Publication date: 2013
- Publication place: United States
- Media type: Print (Paperback)
- Pages: 384
- ISBN: 978-0786963645 (first edition, hardcover)
- OCLC: 795758224
- Dewey Decimal: 813.54
- LC Class: PS3569.A462345 L37
- Preceded by: Charon's Claw

The Last Threshold is a novel by R. A. Salvatore set in the Forgotten Realms campaign setting, and is the fourth book in the Neverwinter Saga. It was released on March 5, 2013.

== Plot summary ==
Now that Charon's Claw is destroyed, Drizzt Do'Urden and his companions—not only Dahlia Sin'felle and Artemis Entreri, but also the former Shadovar Ambergris and Afafrenfere rest in Neverwinter while they decide their next course. Drizzt is resolved to find Guenhwyvar, who has somehow been trapped in the Shadowfell and can no longer be summoned, but when he attempts to summon her some time later, he is successful. He devises a plan to take his companions, particularly Entreri, to rebuild Port Llast in order to show them there is something worthwhile and honorable to do with their skills.

While seeking the help of Arunika, Drizzt and Dahlia find evidence of a vampire, which turns out to be Thibbledorf Pwent, Bruenor Battlehammer's loyal shield dwarf who had tragically been turned into a vampire by Dor'crae. Pwent resolves to remain in the sunlight and be destroyed; Drizzt and Dahlia leave him to go in peace and honor. The group heads north.

In the Shadowfell, Effron is desperate to get back at his mother, Dahlia. He plans to steal Guenhwyvar in order to blackmail Drizzt into leaving Dahlia's side, but the panther is already gone and Lord Draygo Quick discovers his plan.

Meanwhile, Jarlaxle and Athrogate are alive and well and working for Bregan D'aerthe. They find out that Tiago Baenre is seeking Drizzt Do'Urden, who now apparently travels with Artemis Entreri, whom Jarlaxle had both befriended and betrayed. Jarlaxle and Athrograte travel on Bregan D'aerthe business to the Shade Enclave.

Drizzt's group travel to Port Llast so that Entreri can retrieve his dagger and Drizzt can enact his plan. They help rebuild Port Llast. Drizzt notices that Guenhwyvar does not seem to be getting enough rest. That is because Draygo Quick has in fact bound her to the Shadowfell, so she is unable to return home to the Astral Plane when unsummoned. At some point, Effron appears in order to capture Dahlia, but his heart is softened and he ends up joining Drizzt's group instead. Effron tells them about Guenhwyvar.

Drizzt's group go to Draygo Quick's home to retrieve Guenhwyvar. In the process, Dahlia and Entreri are petrified, Drizzt and Effron are captured, and only Ambergris escapes. Drizzt remains a guest/prisoner of Quick for as long as a year before Jarlaxle, having learned of his whereabouts from Ambergris, mounts an assault by Bregan D'aerthe on Quick's residence. Drizzt and his companions are freed and unpetrified. They set forth for Icewind Dale, determined to wait out Tiago's search.

In Icewind Dale, the group inadvertently wander into a portion of Iruladoon, spending a night there that lasts eighteen years. When they awake, it is 1484 DR and it seems the world has forgotten them. Drizzt resolves to stay in Icewind Dale and Dahlia, upset with him, attacks him. Entreri pulls Dahlia away, but not before Drizzt appears to succumb to his wounds on top of Kelvin's Cairn, hearing the voices of his long-dead friends beside him.

== Characters ==
=== Main characters ===
- Drizzt Do'Urden
- Dahlia Sin'felle
- Artemis Entreri

== Reception ==
The Last Threshold reached 20 on The New York Times Best Seller list on March 24, 2013.

The book entered the USA Today Top 150 on March 14, 2013, and was on the USA Today Best-Selling Books list for 1 week, with #70 as its best week.
