= Erin M. Evans =

American novelist

- Born: New York, United States
- Education: Washington University in St. Louis
- Occupations: Editor; short story writer; novelist
- Writing career
- Genres: Short story, novel, fantasy
- Notable awards: Scribe Award; 2012

Erin Marie Evans is an American author, and former editor for Wizards of the Coast.

== Biography ==
Erin M. Evans earned her anthropology degree from Washington University in St. Louis.

Evans wrote the Forgotten Realms novels The God Catcher (February 2010), Brimstone Angels (November 2011), Brimstone Angels: Lesser Evils (December 2012), as well as the short story The Resurrection Agent featured in the Realms of the Dead Anthology (January 2010). Evans wrote the novel The Adversary for The Sundering, a fictional event set in the expanded Dungeons & Dragons universe.

== Awards ==
Evans is a 2012 SCRIBE award winner for best original novel in the speculative fiction category.

== Bibliography ==
- Realms of the Dead: A Forgotten Realms Anthology (January 2010)
- The God Catcher (February 2010)
- Brimstone Angels (November 2011)
- Brimstone Angels: Lesser Evils (December 2012)
- The Adversary: The Sundering, Book III (December 2013)
- Brimstone Angels: Fire in the Blood (October 2014)
- Ashes of the Tyrant (December 2015)
- The Devil You Know (October 2016)
- Empire of Exiles (Books of the Usurper, #1, 2022)
- Relics of Ruin (Books of the Usurper, #2, due in April 2024)
- RuneScape: The Gift of Guthix (due in May 2024)
