= The North: Guide to the Savage Frontier =

1996 role-playing game accessory

- Genre: Role-playing games
- Publisher: TSR
- Publication date: 1996
- Media type: Boxed set

The North: Guide to the Savage Frontier is an accessory for the 2nd edition of the Advanced Dungeons & Dragons fantasy role-playing game, published in 1996.

== Contents ==
The North: Guide to the Savage Frontier is a supplement that consists of two maps and three books, which describe the wilderness and cities of the Forgotten Realms known as The North, with descriptions of such "frosty locales" as the Neverwinter Woods and Frozenfar, as well a detailed examination of the city of Daggerford. "The Wilderness" book provides a regional overview, describing how each place differs, using time lines and revealing the lands north of Waterdeep. The booklet also notes how prevalent in each area are orc raids, elven magic, and what aversion the people have toward foreigners and magic, and it includes information on the characters and ruling powers for each realm. The "Cities" book touches upon every town and city in the North and introduces all the notable characters there. The "Daggerford" book details Daggerford with a variety of non-player characters. The maps continue where those of the preceding Forgotten Realms Campaign Setting leave off.

== Publication history ==
The fictional region detailed in The North was lightly touched on in the Forgotten Realms Campaign Set (1987). It was further detailed in the accessory Waterdeep and the North (1987), although reviewer Jim Bambra found the section on "the North" comparatively weak. The Savage Frontier (1988) from the same series focussed completely on the region. Volo's Guide to the North (1993), an accessory framed as a travel guide, provided more details and flavor about the area. The North: Guide to the Savage Frontier (1996) was published as a boxed set and the most extensive product about the region to date, using much of the material of its predecessors.

== Reception ==
Trenton Webb reviewed The North: Guide to the Savage Frontier for Arcane magazine, rating it a 6 out of 10 overall. He comments that "What the crowd wants is berserk barbarians and arcane magicians battling orc hordes - and that's just what the crowd gets". He adds that "The North achieves what it sets out to do - fill out the top of the Forgotten Realms maps with cities, peoples, legends, monsters and treasure" and that "it offers fair, if not brilliant, value" for the price. Webb complains about the maps: "While portraying accurately the 'world being discovered' cartography, these are a rather annoying asset. Lacking any kind of co-ordinate system, each new city that's mentioned sends you back for yet another session of scouring these vast sheets for information. What's more, this activity isn't helped by the odd mistake" between the text and the map. He comments on the overview style of "The Wilderness" book: "Covering such a vast area so quickly [...] leaves the Wilderness with a scant, breathless feel as it rushes between locations. The coverage is competent, but as is the nature of such overviews, the descriptions are functional lists of facts and stats, with little time for embellishments. Consequently, the cold land described comes over in an almost lifeless manner." Webb commented that the "Cities" book "gets a little more personal, dropping in on each town and city in the North just long enough to introduce you to all the important folk. At times this book could almost be mistaken for a Good Pub Guide, because the only notable feature listed for many of the smaller towns is an inn, but then adventurers are much more likely to be looking for a hot meal and a large mug of ale than the nearest craft shop." He felt that the "Daggerford" book illustrates "just how life goes on in a harsh frontier town. Daggerford itself is a little sparse, almost to the point of being bleak, but that reflects the very real nature of these lawless lands. The true nature of the North is forged from the fact that everyone in Daggerford appears to be an adventurer - either retired, learning or on sabbatical. The result is a rich mine of rumour, skill and knowledge from which great adventures can be created." Webb concludes his review by stating: "The North does offer enough nuggets of information to make it a suitable base for a campaign. Players who wander this way will find a refreshingly uncluttered place that allows - almost encourages - folks to go about their hacking business."

Editorial journalist Stylo reviewed the German translation of the boxed set for Envoyer magazine, and gave it an overall rating of 97 %, verdict very good, with the only caveat being that it is mostly a remake of an older product. He gave the colored maps high marks, and found the detailed town of Daggerford a good start for a new campaign in the area, providing everything necessary for the Dungeon Master. Stylo considered the description of various cities, towns and locations of the North in the "Cities" book detailed, including rumors providing adventure hooks. He found the sorting according to region rather than alphabetically helpful for a stationary adventure, but tedious for a group of characters passing through. "The Wilderness" book provided many new insights in the livestyle and religion of the northern barbarians. Stylo considered it a great idea to give shaman characters a variety totem animals with different abilities to choose from. A number of special locations to annoy and fascinate players, as well as many unique magic items complete the box.

== Reviews ==
- Dragon #235
- Casus Belli #96
- Australian Realms #29
