= Gauntlgrym =

Forgotten Realms novel

- Cover of the first edition
- Author: R. A. Salvatore
- Cover artist: Todd Lockwood
- Language: English
- Series: Neverwinter Saga
- Genre: Fantasy
- Set in: Forgotten Realms
- Published: 2010
- Publisher: Wizards of the Coast
- Publication place: United States
- Media type: Print (Paperback)
- Pages: 345 ((first edition))
- ISBN: 978-0786955008
- OCLC: 500797204
- Dewey Decimal: 813.54
- LC Class: PS3569.A462345 G38
- Followed by: Neverwinter

Gauntlgrym is a fantasy novel by American writer R. A. Salvatore set in the Forgotten Realms campaign setting; it is the first book in the Neverwinter Saga. Released in October 2010, it follows the continued adventures of drow elf renegade, Drizzt Do'Urden. This story is set 24 years after the end of Transitions: The Ghost King.

== Plot summary ==
Gauntlgrym begins in the year 1409, DR in the dwarven complex of Mithral Hall. King Bruenor Battlehammer, with Drizzt Do'Urden, sits on his throne and mourns over the loss of his friend Regis and his adoptive daughter Catti-brie nearly 24 years before. Both Companions of the Hall were lost to the deadly effects of the Spellplague. Wulfgar has returned to Icewind Dale and has decided to remain in those most dangerous of lands. In a conversation with his dear friend Drizzt, Bruenor laments over all that has happened since those terrible events. The signing of the Treaty of Garumn's Gorge has brought a lasting peace to the Silver Marches. Obould II has inherited the Kingdom of Many-Arrows from his father Obould I, though he is not nearly as clever or as powerful as his father. Above all, King Bruenor regrets never completing his quest to find the legendary home of the Delzoun dwarves, Gauntlgrym.

Meanwhile, Nanfoodle, the gnome inventor famous for his Moment of Elminister - a purposeful explosion that sent gas swarming to the surface during a vicious battle 40 years earlier - and Jessa Dribble-Obould, an orc, hatch a plan to poison Bruenor. Nanfoodle poisons the king's ale. Thibbledorf Pwent the battlerager notices something amiss about Nanfoodle's behavior but cannot quite place it. Bruenor drinks the ale and shortly after the entire population of Mithral Hall goes into mourning at the abrupt death of their king. Banak Brawnanvil is named Eleventh King of Mithral Hall. Pwent, distraught over the death of Bruenor, seeks out Nanfoodle and Jessa for answers in the hills outside of Mithral Hall. Upon finding the traitorous pair, he attempts to attack them for answers. During the fight, Drizzt, as well as a very-much alive Bruenor arrives; the latter demands of Pwent what he is doing here instead of at Banak's side. The ever-loyal Pwent replies that his life and his duty lie with his beloved king. It is then revealed that Bruenor faked his death with the help of Nanfoodle and Jessa in order to continue his quest for Gauntlgrym while leaving Mithral Hall in Banak's good hands. Drizzt, Bruenor, Jessa, Nanfoodle, Pwent, Guenhwyvar, and Andahar then leave on their secret quest. (Andahar is a magical unicorn that can be summoned much like Guenhwyvar, Athrogate's demon boar, or Jarlaxle's nightmare. Andahar was a gift to Drizzt from the ruling council of Silverymoon for his work with both blade and diplomacy during the Third Orc War.)

42 years later in the year 1451 DR the elf warrior Dahlia Sin'felle is engaged in a conversation with her vampire lover, Korvin Dor'crae. Dahlia has been charged by the Red Wizard of Thay lich Zulkir Szass Tam to go to create a Dread Ring. This is an enchanted area that produces countless undead minions. She is charged to go to Luskan in order to investigate possibilities. There are several flashbacks of Dahlia as a child and the cruelties she suffered at the hands of Netherese barbarians and demons. She was raped by the barbarians and impregnated by the tiefling Herzgo Alegni and forced to bear his demon offspring which she killed soon after it was born while she was still a child herself.

Dahlia is an exceptionally talented warrior and uses the break staff weapon, Kozah's Needle. This is an eight-foot-long staff that can be broken into four two-foot sections attached by a chain. The break staff can be configured in many ways. It also allows the owner to summon lightning during battle. She also wears diamond studs as a tribute to her lovers. Eight are in her left ear to signify lovers she has murdered and one in her right ear for those who have so far escaped that fate. Before leaving on her mission, she kills her former lover Themerelis, a powerful ranger wielding a greatsword. This angers her rival Sylora Salm as she was also Themerelis' lover.

Meanwhile, Drizzt, Bruenor, and Pwent have continued to search for Gauntlgrym with no success. Nanfoodle and Jessa stay with them for many years, but eventually die of old age. While searching for the lost kingdom in Ten-Towns and Icewind Dale, they investigate rumors of a sanctuary inhabited by a beautiful witch and a halfling caretaker. While visiting Clan Battlehammer, Bruenor (traveling under the alias Bonnego) decides to continue his search for more information to the location of Gauntlgrym. Pwent, having reached an age where he is not as agile and mobile as he once was, reluctantly decides to stay in Icewind Dale when Drizzt and Bruenor take their leave.

Herzgo Alegni is in the city of Neverwinter working with the Netherese and opposing the Ashmadai. Upset that the city lord will not rename a bridge after him, he recalls his chief assassin Barrabus the Gray from his home in Memnon. Barrabus is described as a dark-haired, dark-eyed, slight but muscular man. Although it is never mentioned, he bears a striking resemblance to Drizzt's former arch-rival Artemis Entreri. Barrabus is armed with a main-gauche and a magic knife. The knife can hold and deliver poison with deadly accuracy. He then instructs Barrabus to convince the lord of the city to change the bridge's name. When Barrabus shows disdain towards Herzgo, the assassin is punished by means of a magical tuning fork on the sword that Herzgo carries. The sword is called Claw and has a blood-red blade. The magic attack causes Barrabus much pain. Barrabus is successful in getting the name of the bridge changed.

Dahlia and Dor'crae arrive in Luskan and enter the Illusk (undead section of Luskan). While there, they meet the unstable lich Valindra Shadowmantle. She informs them that the magical disturbances Dahlia has been sent to investigate come from Gauntlgrym. Dor'crae is sent to investigate and returns with news of Gauntlgrym's location. Dahlia realizes that she will need a Delzoun dwarf to access the dwarf kingdom and seeks out Athrogate and his drow friend Jarlaxle and convinces them to accompany her. Herzgo is at odds with the Red Wizards and the Ashmadai, and when he learns of their agents in Luskan he tells Barrabus to go investigate.

Dahlia, Dor'crae, Athrogate, Jarlaxle, and Valindra all head towards Gauntlgrym using the tunnels. They find the place and are able to enter because of Athrogate's heritage as a Delzoun. They encounter dwarf ghosts while there. Their goal is the Forge of Gauntlgrym at the center of the city, reputed to have crafted the finest items in its day. Dor'crae uses a magical device that allows Sylora Salm to follow them from afar. The party is attacked along the way by dire corbies. While engaged with these black bird-men, Sylora arrives with some henchmen and proceeds to attack the party as well. Athrogate is forced to the forge and, under the hypnotic powers of Dor'crae and Sylora, is coerced into believing that the Gauntlgrym ghosts want him to throw the lever that will activate the forge. When this happens a fire primordial (ancient being of almost godlike power) is released.

Dor'crae, Valindra, and Sylora make their escape. Jarlaxle, Athrogate, and Dahlia also make their way back to Luskan. Sylora then seeks out Dahlia and commands her to follow her and serve her under threat of death and Szass Tam's displeasure. Barrabus plans to leave Neverwinter for Luskan. Drizzt and Bruenor still travel the country nearby. At this moment the primordial that has been released causes a volcanic explosion. Venting its rage against living beings, it targets Neverwinter and destroys the town. Barrabus is barely able to survive.

Eleven years later in 1462 DR the Dread Ring has been completed thanks to the death and destruction caused by the primordial's rage. New types of undead stalk the land. The war between the Thayans, the Ashmadai, and the Netherese escalates. Dahlia is forced to serve Sylora and Barrabus hunts the Ashmadai with great success under orders from Herzgo. Dahlia and Barrabus's efforts culminate in a confrontation between the pair. Dahlia's unorthodox weapon initially grants her an advantage over Barrabus’ two-handed style, yet Barrabus eventually forces Dahlia to go on the defensive and outright flee at one point as Barrabus increases the tempo of combat, suggesting that Barrabus is actually the more skilled of the two combatants. Dahlia takes to the trees for cover as Barrabus pursues but Barrabus uses Dahlia's own trick against her as he takes to the trees as well causing Dahlia to completely lose track of him. Further combat between the two is forgone as Dahlia discovers and joins ranks with an Ashmadai patrol group. Jarlaxle and Athrogate continue to reside in Luskan, still seeking a way to avenge themselves for the events that occurred in Gauntlgrym 11 years before.

The ghost dwarves of Gauntlgrym, wanting to reseal the primordial, spread out across the land searching for Delzoun dwarves to help. Eventually they arrive in Icewind Dale and cryptically inform the dwarves of their plight. They also inform Bruenor of the situation. He and Drizzt then take it upon themselves to seal the primordial. Jarlaxle meanwhile returns to Menzoberranzan to seek the help of his brother Gromph in sealing away the primordial. Jarlaxle learns that he will need a dwarf king in addition to other magical devices. Dahlia also searches for a way to get back to Gauntlgrym and to seal off the primordial, hoping this will lead to her freedom from Sylora. Finding the way blocked (the tunnels have collapsed), Dahlia seeks out Jarlaxle.

Bruenor, deciding where to go next, is robbed of his maps in the woods by a drow elf. Drizzt, correctly deducing who is behind this, leads Bruenor to Luskan in search of Jarlaxle. Dahlia finds Jarlaxle and accepts a magic ring from him. Bruenor and Drizzt arrive at the Cutlass in Luskan. There they are attacked by Ashmadai led by Dahlia. Jarlaxle and Athrogate enter the fight. The four of them beat back the attackers and Dahlia appears to be captured by Jarlaxle's 'wand of goo'. Instead, Dahlia uses the ring to fake her death.

Jarlaxle, Athrogate, Dahlia, Bruenor, and Drizzt decide to travel to Gauntlgrym together in an attempt to stop the primordial and hopefully destroy the Dread Ring in the process. The five proceed to Gauntlygrym overland in search of a cave that will lead them down. They are attacked by a group of Ashmadai near the cave. This battle is observed by Dor'crae and Sylora who follow them. Barrabus also witnesses the fight and upon seeing Drizzt is overcome by emotion and retreats without having been seen by anyone.

The five enter Gauntlgrym whereupon Bruenor sits upon the dwarf king's throne and is enchanted with divine power and knowledge from the ancient dwarves. The primordial has attracted many minions from the Elemental Plane of Fire to fight off intruders, powerful salamanders and even a small red dragon. Sylora and Dor'crae enter along with a host of Ashmadai. Valindra uses a magical scepter given to her by Sylora to summon Beealtimatuche, a pit fiend from the Nine Hells. Meanwhile, in order to contain the primordial, the five companions must strategically place 10 bowls that summon water elementals in various places throughout the city. Fighting through waves of salamanders, the five companions begin to set the elemental bowls into the proper alcoves. During the fighting, dwarves from Icewind Dale and Mirabar (who have also been visited by dwarf ghosts) arrive in another part of Gauntlgrym in order to help seal the primordial.

The companions are only able to place nine of the ten summoning bowls as one alcove had been destroyed earlier. They then head to the Forge Of Gauntlgrym. In a trance, Bruenor places his axe and shield into the forge and removes them, to find that they are magically enhanced. The shield now provides real potions of heroism to the companions. The Ashmadai, led by the pit fiend, who just killed the red dragon, then enter the forge room. The pit fiend engages the five and manages to kill the consummate survivor Jarlaxle in one blow. While Drizzt and Dahlia hold off the Ashmadai and several legion devils, Athrogate and Bruenor move deeper into the city to seal the primordial, but are intercepted by Beealtimatuche. Athrogate attempts to fight the devil, but is only able to wound the devil before he slapped aside. God-blessed Bruenor engages Beealtimatuche in a titanic battle, but even with his new powers, the devil seizes the upper hand.

Thibbledorf Pwent - left behind in Icewind Dale - reappears and goes after Bruenor to protect him. Dahlia and Drizzt gain the upper hand until Valindra arrives. The lich is driven away by Jarlaxle who was not killed but saved by the same ring that allowed Dahlia to fake her own death. Drizzt, Jarlaxle, and Dahlia then go after Bruenor. Bruenor is aided by Pwent, who is nearly killed by the pit fiend. Finally, the grievously-injured King Bruenor cleaves the devil's head in half and throws him in the heart of the primordial.

Pwent helps the mortally wounded Bruenor toward the lever. Dahlia enters just in time to see Dor'crae (who has followed them in) tear out Pwent's throat. Dahlia then attacks and drives the vampire off with a wooden spike from her magic ring.

Bruenor, with his last ounce of strength manages to pull the lever and. Attempting to escape, Dor'crae is caught in a waterfall created when the lever was pulled, and explodes into black flakes, seemingly destroyed. The primordial is sealed. The Dread Ring is broken. Drizzt manages get to Bruenor and hold him in tender embrace and with his last breath nodded to Drizzt with a look of comfort died in an embrace of friendship. Jarlaxle manages to help Athrogate escape. Bruenor is buried in Gauntlgrym along with Pwent. Dahlia moves the last earring to her left ear, symbolizing the vampire's death. She plans to face Sylora who not only avoided the battle, but was the principal advisor to the plan. Drizzt, with growing feelings toward her, decides to accompany her.

In the epilogue, Bruenor wakes up in the forest of the goddess Mielikki. He is met by his dear friend Regis and adoptive son Wulfgar. Regis remarks that Bruenor is indeed dead, and when he motions behind the dwarf king, he turns to see his adopted daughter, Catti-brie, dancing in the woods. The crusty dwarf, who so often hides his feelings from even those closest to him, sinks to his knees and cries.

== Reception ==
Ryan Van Cleave of California Literary Review stated that Gauntlgrym is a "quick read with satisfying fight scenes, and deeply layered with emotional atmosphere." Van Cleave also concluded that it is a solid addition to Drizzt's ongoing story. Gauntlgrym debuted on The New York Times bestseller list at number 13 on October 24, 2010.

The book entered the USA Today Top 150 on October 14, 2010, and was on the USA Today Best-Selling Books list for 2 weeks, with #75 as its best week.

== Reviews ==
- Review by uncredited (2010) in Leading Edge, December 2010
