= Neverwinter Saga =

Novel series by R. A. Salvatore

- Gauntlgrym; Neverwinter; Charon's Claw; The Last Threshold
- Author: R. A. Salvatore
- Country: United States
- Language: English
- Genre: Epic fantasy
- Publisher: Wizards of the Coast
- Published: 2010 - 2013
- Media type: Print
- No. of books: 4
- Preceded by: Transitions
- Followed by: The Sundering

Neverwinter Saga is a saga written in the Forgotten Realms campaign world, a popular Dungeons & Dragons role-playing setting, by fantasy and science fiction author R.A. Salvatore. The tetralogy begins with Gauntlgrym which is set twenty-four years after the events of The Ghost King. Gauntlgrym is also the twentieth book concerning one of Salvatore's famous characters, Drizzt Do'Urden. The saga contains Gauntlgrym, Neverwinter, Charon's Claw, and The Last Threshold. This tetralogy is preceded by The Transitions Series.

== Works included ==
1. Gauntlgrym (2010)
2. Neverwinter (2011)
3. Charon's Claw (2012)
4. The Last Threshold (2013)

== Plot summary ==
=== Gauntlgrym ===
In this title, Drizzt joins Bruenor Battlehammer on his quest to find the fabled dwarven kingdom of Gauntlgrym: said to be rich ancient treasure and arcane lore. However, Jarlaxle and Athrogate discover it first. In their search for treasure and magic, the enemy drow and dwarf pair inadvertently set into motion a catastrophe that could spell disaster for the unsuspecting inhabitants of Neverwinter—a catastrophe large enough for Jarlaxle to risk his own skin and money to stop it. To their dismay, the more they uncover about the ancient dwarven kingdom, the more they see they can't stop it on their own. This ends up in an unlikely teaming up with none other than Drizzt and Bruenor. Drizzt's lust for battle increases and he begins to wonder if he is truly different from any other dark elf, and if he loses the last of his companions he wonders if he will succumb to drow nature. In the end, Bruenor must sacrifice his life in order to save his friends and all of Neverwinter.

=== Neverwinter ===
Set days after the events of Gauntlgrym, Drizzt is now the sole survivor of the companions of Mithral Hall leaving him with guilt and relief in his new freedom for the first time in nearly one hundred years. Accompanied by Dahlia Sin'felle, the only other survivor from their party at Mount Hotenow, they decide that their best course of action is to head to Luskan in order to regroup and learn what they may. The two head towards the town aided by Drizzt's magical unicorn Andahar. It is revealed that the unicorn can be killed, although it is magical. On a positive note, It can also stay in the Realms for as long as needed with no time limit restraints. However, because it has more vulnerabilities than his other magical familiar, Guenhwyvar, Drizzt is much more cautious in his use of Andahar. While in Luskan, the group runs afoul of the pirate captains, but end up escaping. Drizzt soon finds himself on the opposite side of the law. Dahlia forces him to see the dark things a common man could be driven to do, under certain circumstances. The two find themselves in battle quickly, and Drizzt finds himself enjoying the constant toil.

=== Charon's Claw ===
Drizzt and Dahlia return to Neverwinter with plans of revenge against the Netherese lord Herzgo Alegni, heralding a final battle for freedom. Drizzt then reunites with his old foe, Artemis Entreri, to destroy the magical weapon that has control of him, Charon's Claw — even at the cost of losing his life as well. The novel will focus on how Drizzt will prepare to fight Herzgo Alegni and prelude the appearance of Dagult Neverember, who is set to be the Lord Protector of New Neverwinter.

== Reception ==
=== Gauntlgrym ===
Ryan Van Cleave of California Literary Review stated that Gauntlgrym is a "quick read with satisfying fight scenes, and deeply layered with emotional atmosphere." Van Cleave also concluded that it is a solid addition to Drizzt's ongoing story. Gauntlgrym debuted on the New York Times bestseller list at number 13.

=== Neverwinter ===
Neverwinter debuted on the New York Times bestseller list at number 4. A staff reviewer from enworld.org gave Neverwinter a 4.5 out 5 stating that "Neverwinter is filled with great intrigue,, and some smart dialogue, particularly between Drizzt and Dahlia, where they test their morals, ethics, and philosophies of life off each other, like duelists looking for a weakness."

== Publication history ==
Title	Author	ISBN	Publisher	US Release Date
Gauntlgrym	R.A. Salvatore	ISBN 978-0786955008	Wizards of the Coast	October 5, 2010
Neverwinter	R.A. Salvatore	ISBN 978-0786958429	Wizards of the Coast	October 4, 2011
Charon's Claw	R.A. Salvatore	ISBN 978-0786962235	Wizards of the Coast	August 7, 2012
The Last Threshold	R.A. Salvatore	ISBN 978-0786963645	Wizards of the Coast	March 5, 2013
