= Neverwinter (novel) =

Forgotten Realms novel by R. A. Salvatore

- The Cover of Neverwinter
- Author: R. A. Salvatore
- Cover artist: Todd Lockwood
- Language: English
- Series: Neverwinter Saga
- Genre: Fantasy
- Publisher: Wizards of the Coast
- Publication date: October 4, 2011
- Publication place: United States
- Media type: Print (Hardback)
- Pages: 352
- ISBN: 978-0-7869-5842-9
- Preceded by: Gauntlgrym
- Followed by: Charon's Claw (novel)

Neverwinter is a fantasy novel by American author R. A. Salvatore. Released in October 2011, it is set in the Forgotten Realms campaign world. It is the second book in the Neverwinter Saga. It follows the continued adventures of drow elf renegade Drizzt Do'Urden. This story is set days after the events of Gauntlgrym and brings back both familiar and unfamiliar characters.

== Plot summary ==
The story begins shortly after the events occurring in Gauntlgrym. Drizzt and Dahlia are in the wilderness of the north planning to return to Neverwinter. Dahlia explains to Drizzt that although the Dread Ring has been broken, Sylora Salm will make it her priority to reestablish it by any means necessary. Deciding that their best course of action is to head to Luskan to regroup and learn what they may, the two head towards the town aided by Drizzt's magical unicorn Andahar. It is revealed that the unicorn, although magical in nature can be killed. It can also stay in the Realms for as long as needed with no time limit restraints. Because it has more vulnerabilities than his other magical familiar, Guenhwyvar, Drizzt is much more cautious when using Andahar.

The pair soon encounter a caravan being chased by bandits. Drizzt immediately rushes to help. Dahlia questions his motives. Drizzt assumes that the caravan is goodly in nature, and Dahlia (perhaps more world wise though much younger than Drizzt) does not jump to the same conclusion. Drizzt speaks with the merchants who tell him they are representatives of the High Captains of Luskan. Nearly 100 years ago the High Captains played a major role in the death of Drizzt's long time friend Captain Deudermont. Drizzt rushes to engage the bandits while Dahlia needles him about how the world is not always black and white/ right or wrong (this is a major theme of the book as Dahlia continually questions Drizzt's morals). After defeating the first few bandits it is learned that they are starving farmers driven off of their lands by the High Captains' policies. They intended to rob the caravan to feed themselves and their families. Drizzt and Dahlia share a meal with the bandits and Drizzt begins to question his ethics in this dark time throughout the North.

Sylora Salm stands with her new lieutenant and Ashmadai zealot Jestry Rallevin in front of the greatly weakened Dread Ring. Sulkir Szass Tam appears in the Ring and lets Sylora know that he is displeased with her efforts and is prepared to destroy her for her failure. Before he can act the insane lich Valindra Shadowmantle arrives. Although insane she has moments of clarity and cunning which she uses to convince Szass Tam to spare their lives. As a result, Szass gives Sylora a wand that lets her channel the powers of the Dread Ring and commands her to conquer Neverwinter and complete the Dread Ring once again. Sylora sends Jestry to attend Valindra and to keep an eye on her, tempting him with the promise of making him her lover. Meanwhile, Herzgo Alegni commands for Barrabus the Grey to be brought before him and explain why his orders to kill Sylora were not carried out. Barrabus explains that she was too well guarded and suggests that if he were given his dagger back (a gem encrusted life stealing dagger) that he might be able to accomplish the job.

Drizzt and Dahlia reach the outskirts of Luskan. They take a detour to the farmlands so that Drizzt may learn of their condition. He finds a farmhouse occupied by a woman and her five children after her husband has left. He tries to give them money which Dhalia stops him from doing. They leave the farm with more of Drizzt's moral values being questioned. Sylora uses the power of the wand she acquired to raise a fortress in which to direct her campaign. Valindra reveals that she still possesses the soul of the vampire Korvin Dor'crae. She also seeks out a woman named Arunika who promises to help her with her insanity. Barrabus arrives in Neverwinter on behalf of the Shadovar and offers to help the town defend itself. At first skeptical Barrabus reminds them that the Shadovar used to protect the town before the primordial cataclysm and that he himself lived through it by hiding under the town bridge.

Drizzt and Dahlia enter Luskan and shortly after Dahlia uses a magic item to alter her appearance. She did so after entering the town because she did not mind (wanted) some of the High Captains to know she was there. The two make their way to Jarlaxle's apartment to see if they can find word of him or Athrogate. They are presumed dead but Drizzt believes in Jarlaxle's ability to survive any situation. They are soon attacked by Ship Renthor seeking revenge against Dahlia for killing their High Captain. Things go badly for the two until they are rescued by Beniago of Ship Kurth. Drizzt notices Beniago has a jewel encrusted dagger that he swears he has seen before, but shakes it off and concludes that his mind is playing tricks on him.

Sylora continues to gather her forces when Hadencourt a malebranche devil in the service of Szass arrives. Sylora assigns him the task of heading north and destroying Dahlia. Valindra gathers her forces in preparation of attacking Neverwinter. Before the attack Jestry and Sylora go to visit Valindra's friend Arunika who promises them her help. It is also revealed that she is a succubus. The attack on Neverwinter occurs and Barrabus takes to the field and begins to turn the battle. At the predetermined time Herzgo leads the Shadovar forces in and defeats the Ashmadai forces. But instead of Herzgo being held as the hero the townfolk cheer for Barrabus, who suggest the name of the bridge be renamed for him "The Walk of Barrabus". The Shadovar begin to reestablish their power in Neverwinter.

Drizzt and Dahlia are offered alliance with Ship Kurth which they conditionally accept. Returning to Jaraxle's apartment Dahlia continues to questions Drizzt's morals. The conversation ends with the two of them becoming lovers and going to bed. Dahlia sneaks off and goes to rob Ship Kurth of some of their jewels. This is a setup and Dahlia soon finds herself in a fight against Beniago against his magic dagger (of life stealing) and in a room full of traps she doesn't know. She is injured and poisoned by one of these traps and is saved by Drizzt. She claims she had everything in hand but did not. They make their escape out of Luskan but Dahlia soon succumbs to the poison. Drizzt takes her to the farmhouse the two visited earlier and begs the woman for help. She says she will call the local herb man but that they need a dose of the poison in order to make an antidote. Drizzt returns to Luskan and trades the antidote from Beniago for the promise to support him in future once he has taken the title of High Captain of Ship Kurth. Drizzt returns in time and is able to save Dahlia.

The pair continue south where they are met by Hadencourt who poses as a friend. He soon attacks them and summons devils to help him. Drizzt and Dahlia begin a desperate battle in the woods. They are able to kill a few of the war devils' minions but are forced to run. They think they have escaped but the spirit of Dor'crae is able to track them and tell the devils where they are. The battle finally ends when Drizzt summons Andahar and impales Hadencourt. As the demon is dying it promises to get revenge and Drizzt tells him to get in line behind Errtu.

In Neverwinter Herzgo is visited by Draygo Quick a powerful warlock of the Netherese and his master. Draygo wishes for Herzgo to finish his conquest of the region and leaves his disciple a teifling Effron the Twisted behind. Effron has one deformed arm and Herzgo and Effron openly despise each other. Valindra arrives in the cave of Arunika's master for their help. It is revealed that they are the Aboleth Sovereignty. The aboleth helps with Valindra's mental state and an alliance of convenience is formed between the Thayans and the Sovereignty. Jestry is brought to the Aboleth and is transformed using umber hulk skin. The process is fatal and will eventually kill him within the year, but he is transformed into a mindless slave with the sole purpose of being Sylora's champion against Dahlia.

Herzgo learns of Arunika who is also called the Forset Sentinel by the locals. He visits her and is able to discern her true nature, he then forms an alliance with her. Herzgo returns to Neverwinter and begins to punish Barrabus for his renaming of the bridge after himself. The Claw is a sword carried by Herzgo and attuned to the soul of Barrabus. It is revealed that Barrabus cannot die even if he tries to kill himself. The sword will either stop him or bring him back to life. He is a slave to the sword with no hope of freedom except to kill Herzgo and take the sword which he cannot do as long as Herzgo wields the sword. The Thayans attack and use their new allies' umber hulks to attack from below. Barrabus' attacks are largely ineffectual and Herzgo carries the day and earns the peoples admiration.

Dahlia and Drizzt continue on towards Neverwinter. Drizzt begins to share his past and recount stories of the Companions Of The Hall. Soon they are attacked by Shadovar and Dahlia exhibits a brutality Drizzt has never seen in her before and does not understand. He is reminded that there is much he does not know about her. Barrabus and Effron are assigned to work together and to hunt down Ashmadai. They come across a group led by Jestry. Effron does little and lets Barrabus do most of the work and take most of the risk. Barrabus is mostly successful except against Jestry whose new armor proves to be more formidable than even his own weapons. After the battle Herzgo learns that Dahlia returns in the company of Drizzt. Effron also reveals that he knows Dahlia Sin'felle's real name- Dahlia Syn'dalay of the Snakebrook clan. This fills Herzgo with terrible anger as he knows who she is now. Barrabus offers to go kill Dahlia and Drizzt alone.

Barrabus knows of Drizzt's prowess and believes if he can get him to fight Herzgo he can kill him. He devises a plan to capture Dahlia alive and force Drizzt to fight Herzgo. He ambushes Dahlia but is then immediately ambushed by Drizzt. Drizzt looks at him and recognizes the face of Artemis Entreri. He doesn't believe it but is soon convinced when Artemis reveals intimate knowledge of him that only he would know. Artemis proposes a truce between the three and suggests they go kill Sylora. Drizzt and Dahlia do not trust him. He explains to Drizzt he grew bored of him long ago and has no vendetta against him. To Dahlia he explains it is nothing personal and that killing Sylora will meet both of their goals. As a final act of trust Artemis attacks Drizzt and holds his poisoned knife under his throat and pulls it back without harming him, proving that he has no intention of hurting him. Both Drizzt and Entreri are both surprised at how happy they are to see each other alive, for different reasons though.

The three head towards Sylora's camp. There they are engaged by many undead, Ashmadai, Valindra, Sylora, and Jestry. Eventually Dahlia and Entreri are able to defeat Jestry. Valindra still suffers from some mental instability and spends the majority of the battle watching from afar. Sylora is eventually cornered in the Dread Ring. However, she has used the wand's power too much and drawn off too much of the Dread Ring's power and succumbs to combined attacks of Drizzt, Guenhwyvar, and Dahlia. In the aftermath of the battle Entreri tells them that he must return to Neverwinter as compelled to serve Herzgo. Dahlia upon hearing this name learns that her most hated foe is the leader of the Shadovar and declares she would have stayed by Sylora's side had she known. Entreri finds this useful but can't think of a way to exploit it. With Sylora dead Dahlia considered her business in the region finished until she learns of Herzgo whom she vows to kill.

Sylora's life is preserved by the power of the Dread Ring but before she can do anything, Jestry returns as an undead under the control of Valindra and kills her. Effron and Herzgo contemplate Dahlia and share a mutual hatred of her, even greater than their hatred of each other.

== Reception ==
Neverwinter debuted on The New York Times bestseller list at number 4. A staff reviewer from enworld.org gave Neverwinter a 4.5 out 5 stating that "Neverwinter is filled with great intrigue, and some smart dialogue, particularly between Drizzt and Dahlia, where they test their morals, ethics, and philosophies of life off each other, like duelists looking for a weakness."
